= Finnair =

National airline of Finland

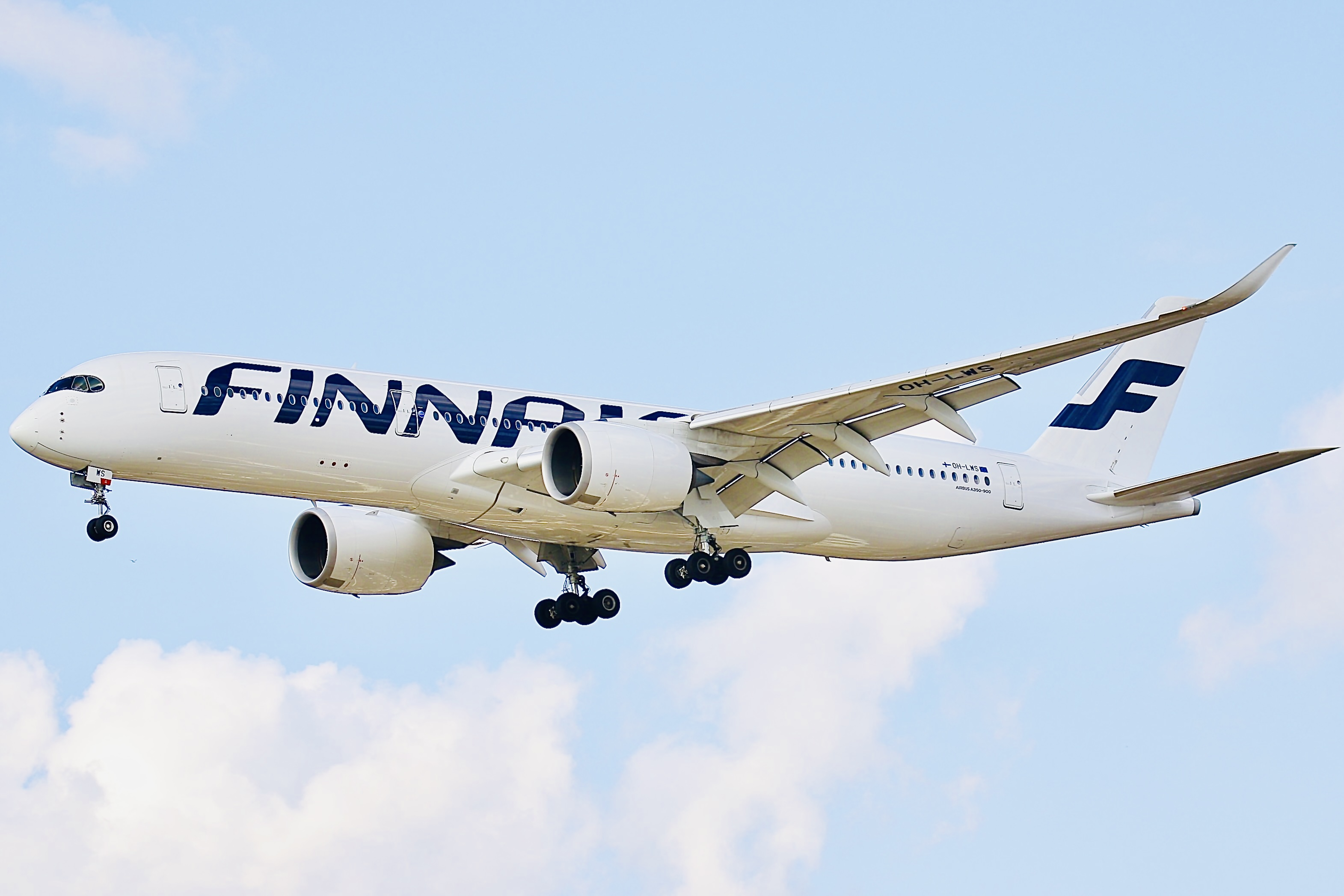
- Finnair Airbus A350-900
IATA	ICAO	Call sign
AY	FIN	FINNAIR
- Founded: 1 November 1923; 103 years ago (as Aero O/Y)
- Hubs: Helsinki-Vantaa Airport
- Frequent-flyer program: Finnair Plus (Avios Loyalty Program)
- Alliance: Oneworld
- Subsidiaries: FlyNordic (2003–2007); Finnair Facilities Management; Finnair Cargo; Finnair Aircraft Finance; Finnair Travel Services; Nordic Regional Airlines
- Fleet size: 77 (incl. Nordic Regional Airlines)
- Destinations: 104
- Parent company: Finnair Group
- Traded as: Nasdaq Helsinki: FIA1S
- Headquarters: Aviapolis, Vantaa, Finland
- Key people: Turkka Kuusisto (CEO)
- Revenue: ▲EUR 3,048.8 million (2024)
- Operating income: ▲EUR 46 million (2024)
- Net income: ▼EUR 37 million (2024)
- Total assets: ▲EUR 3,877 million (2019)
- Total equity: ▼EUR 918.5 million (2019)
- Employees: 5,230 (31 December 2022)
- Website: www.finnair.com

Finnair Plc (Finnish: Finnair Oyj, Swedish: Finnair Abp) is the flag carrier and largest full-service legacy airline of Finland, with headquarters in Vantaa on the grounds of Helsinki Airport, its hub. Finnair and its subsidiaries dominate both domestic and international air travel in Finland. The majority shareholder is the Finnish State, which owns 55.68% of shares through the Prime Minister's Office. Finnair is a member of Oneworld alliance. Founded in 1923, Finnair is one of the oldest airlines in continuous operation and is consistently listed as one of the safest in the world. The company's slogans are Designed for you and The Nordic Way.

== History ==
=== Founding ===
In 1923, consul Bruno Lucander founded Finnair as Aero O/Y (Aero Ltd). The company code, "AY", stands for Aero Osake-yhtiö ("yhtiö" means "company" in Finnish). Lucander had previously run the Finnish operations of the Estonian airline Aeronaut. In mid 1923, he concluded an agreement with Junkers Flugzeugwerke AG to provide aircraft and technical support in exchange for a 50% ownership in the new airline. The charter establishing the company was signed in Helsinki on 12 September 1923, and the company was entered into the trade register on 11 December 1923. The first flight was on 20 March 1924, from Helsinki to Tallinn, Estonia, on a Junkers F.13 aircraft equipped with floats. The seaplane service ended in 1936 following the construction of the first aerodromes in Finland.

=== World War II ===
Air raids on Helsinki and other Finnish cities made World War II a difficult period for the airline. Half of the fleet was requisitioned by the Finnish Air Force and it was estimated that, during the Winter War in 1939 and 1940, half of the airline's passengers from other Finnish cities were children being evacuated to Sweden.

=== Immediate postwar period ===
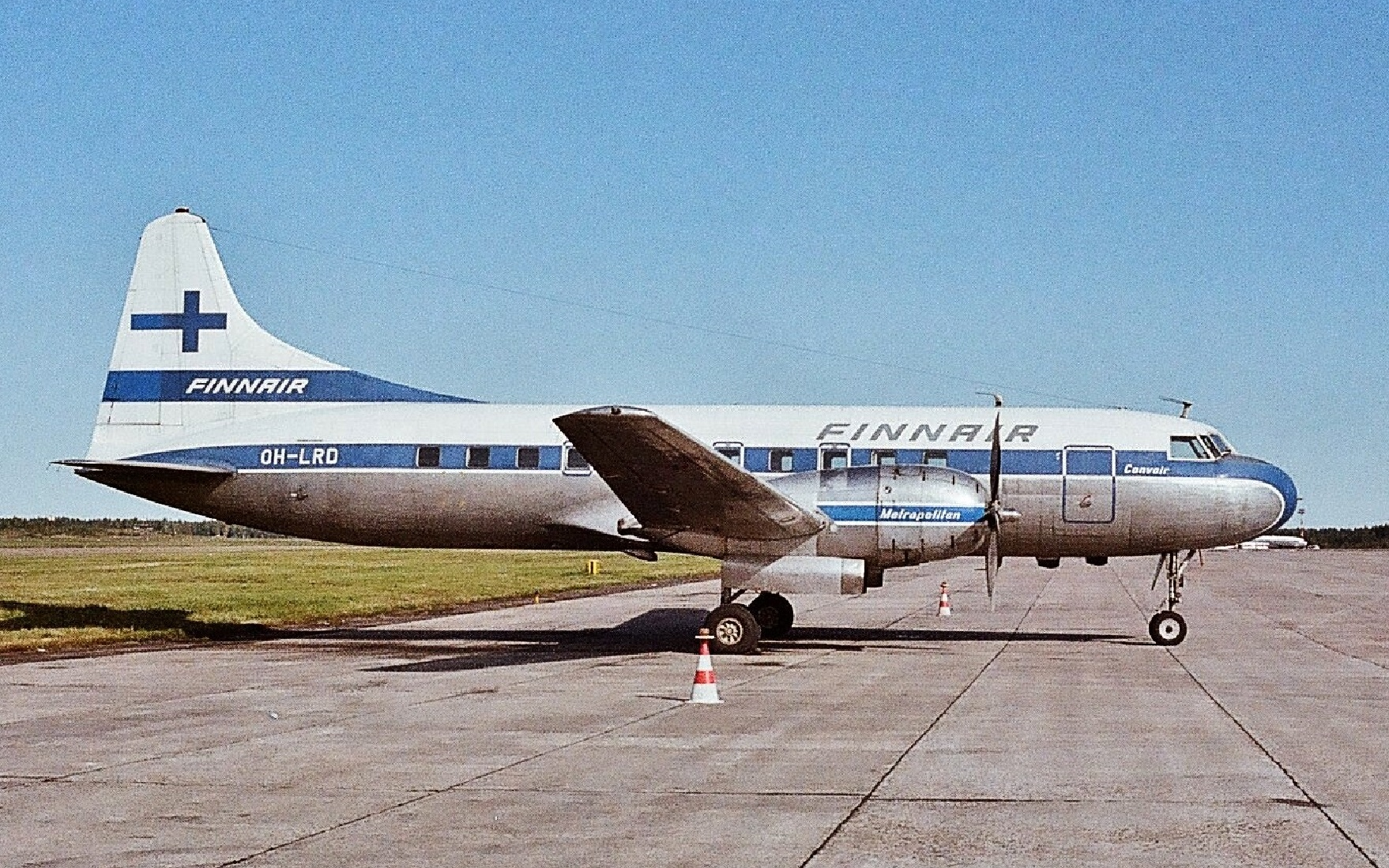
Convair 440

The Finnish government wanted longer routes, so it acquired a majority stake in the company in 1946 and re-established services to Europe in November 1947, initially using the Douglas DC-3. In 1953, the airline began branding itself as Finnair. The Convair 440 twin-engined pressurised airliner was acquired from January 1953, and these faster aircraft were operated on the company's longer routes as far as London. It began branding as Finnair in 1953, though the legal name remained Aero O/Y.

=== Jet Age (1960s and 1970s) ===
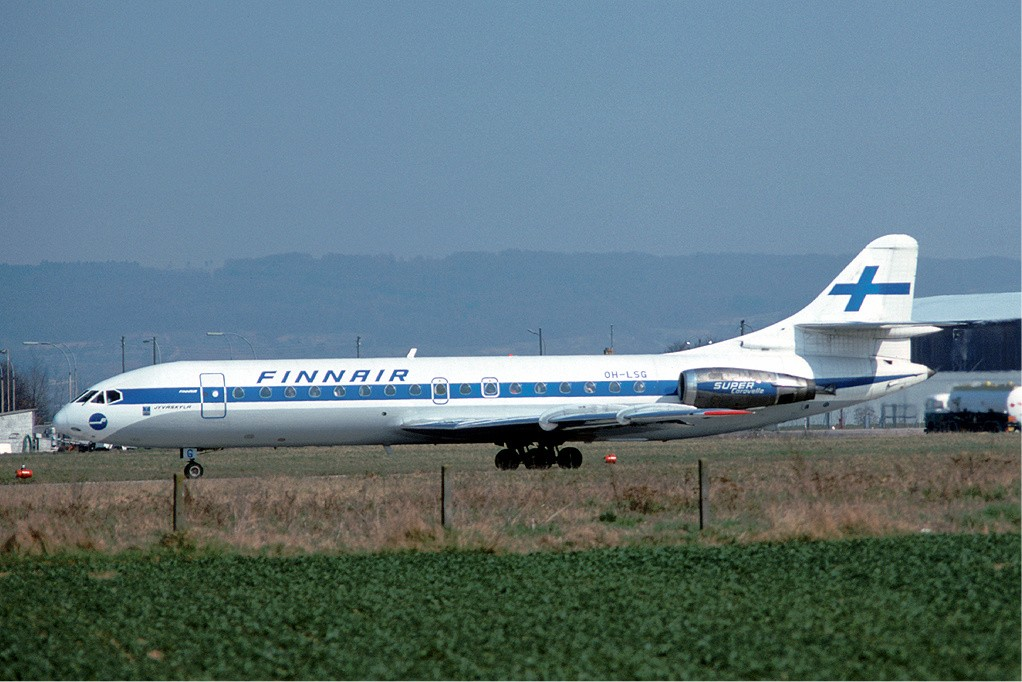
Sud SE-210 Caravelle 10B3 in 1976

In 1961, Finnair joined the jet age by adding Rolls-Royce Avon-engined Caravelles to its fleet. These were later exchanged with the manufacturer for Pratt & Whitney JT8D-engined Super Caravelles. In 1962, Finnair acquired a 27% controlling interest in a private Finnish airline, Kar-Air. Finnair Oy became the company's official name on 25 June 1968. In 1969, it took possession of its first U.S. made jet, a Douglas DC-8. The first transatlantic service to New York was inaugurated on 15 May 1969. In the 1960s, Finnair's head office was in Helsinki.

Finnair received its first wide-body aircraft in 1975, two DC-10-30 planes. The first of these arrived on 4 February 1975 and entered service on 14 February 1975, flying between Helsinki and New York City, later between Helsinki and Las Palmas.

Finnair created Finnaviation in June 1979. It was formed from the reorganisation of Wihuri Oy Finnwings (which had started services in 1950 as Lentohuolto Oy) and its merger with Oy Nordair Ab. Scheduled domestic services began in October 1979. In the early 1980s, Finnair held a 60% shareholding. In September 1996, Finnaviation was completely merged into Finnair.

=== Expansion (1980s) ===
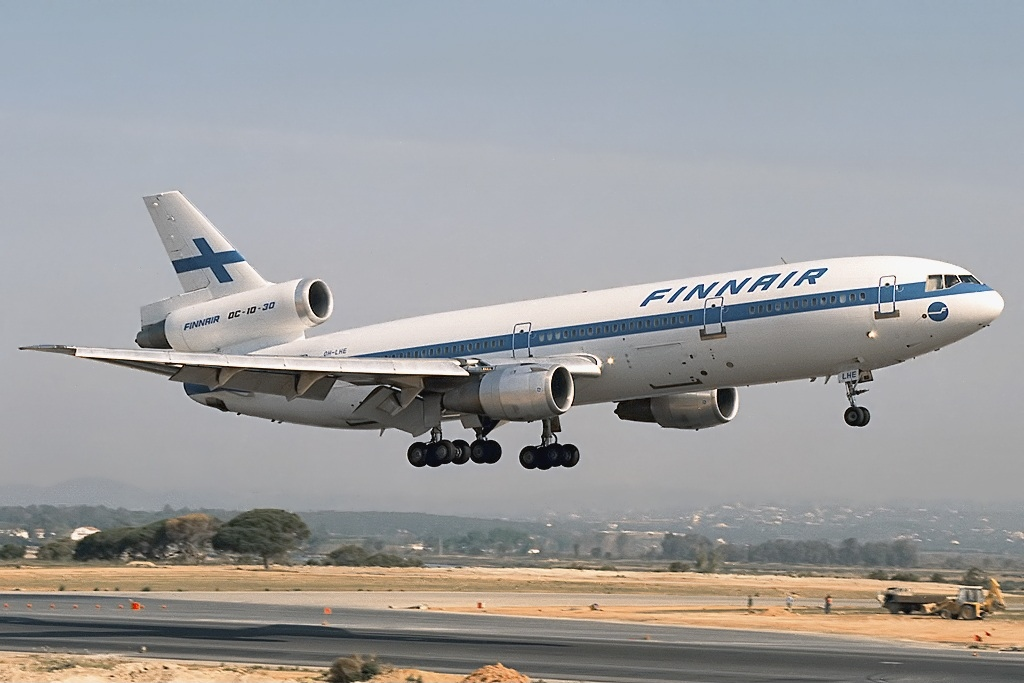
Douglas DC-10-30

In 1981, Finnair opened routes to Seattle and Los Angeles. Finnair became the first operator to fly non-stop from Western Europe to Japan, operating Helsinki–Tokyo flights with a modified McDonnell Douglas DC-10-30ER in April 1983. Until then, flights had to go via Moscow (Aeroflot, SAS, BA) or Anchorage (most carriers) due to Soviet airspace restrictions, but Finnair circumvented these by flying directly north from Helsinki, over the North Pole and back south through the Bering Strait, avoiding Soviet airspace. However, Finnair did not have to make a roundabout because of the Soviet regulation on this route, but the Japanese authorities demanded it (as JAL requested strongly). The aircraft was fitted with extra fuel tanks, taking 13 hours for the trip. The routes through Soviet airspace and with a stopover in Moscow also took 13 hours, but flights with a stopover in Anchorage took up to 16 hours, giving Finnair a competitive edge. In the spring of 1986, Soviet regulators finally cleared the way for Air France and Japan Airlines to fly nonstop Paris-Tokyo services over Soviet airspace, putting Finnair at a disadvantage.

Finnair launched a Helsinki-Beijing route in 1988, making Finnair the first Western European carrier to fly non-stop between Europe and China. In 1989, Finnair became the launch customer for the McDonnell Douglas MD-11, the first of which was delivered on 7 December 1990. The first revenue service with the MD-11 took place on 20 December 1990, with OH-LGA operating a flight from Helsinki to Tenerife in the Canary Islands.

=== Subsidiary airlines (1990s–2000s) ===
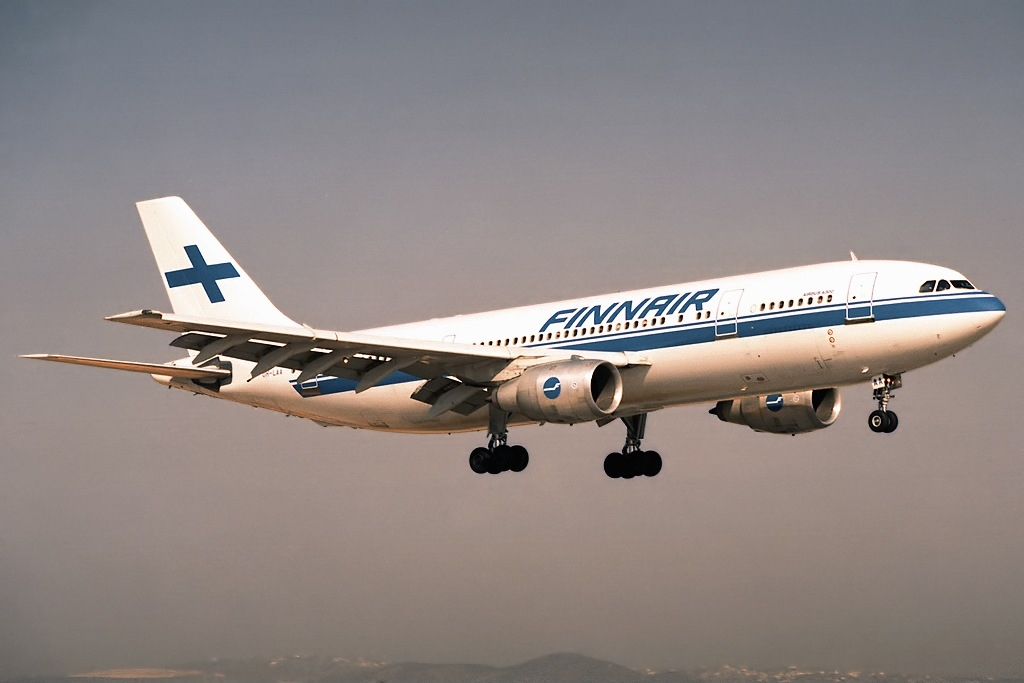
Airbus A300 in 1995

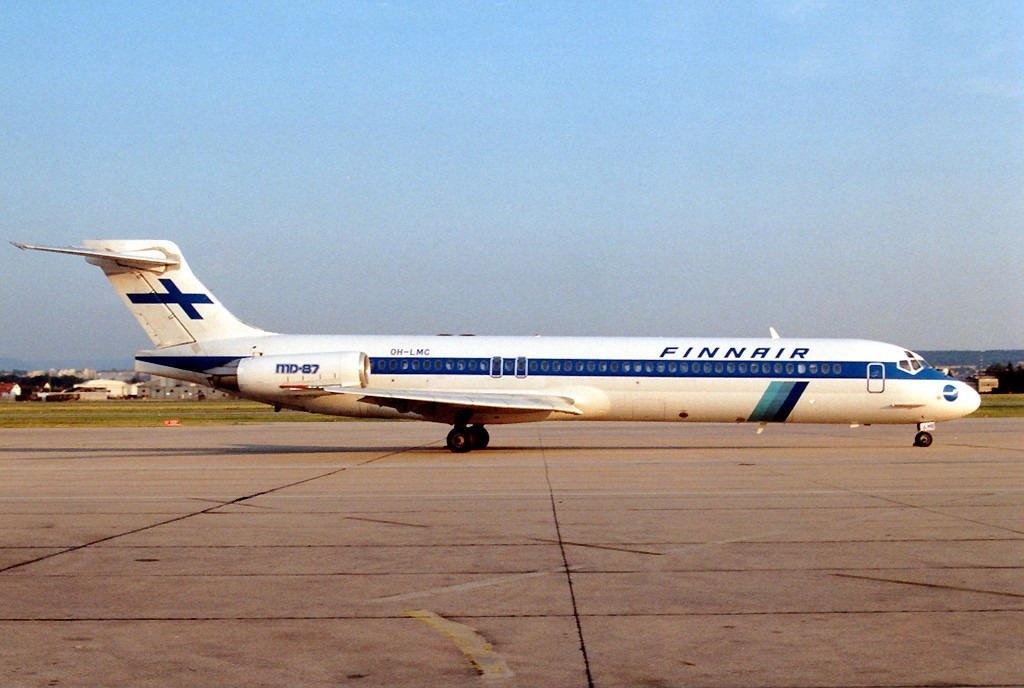
McDonnell Douglas MD-87 in 1991

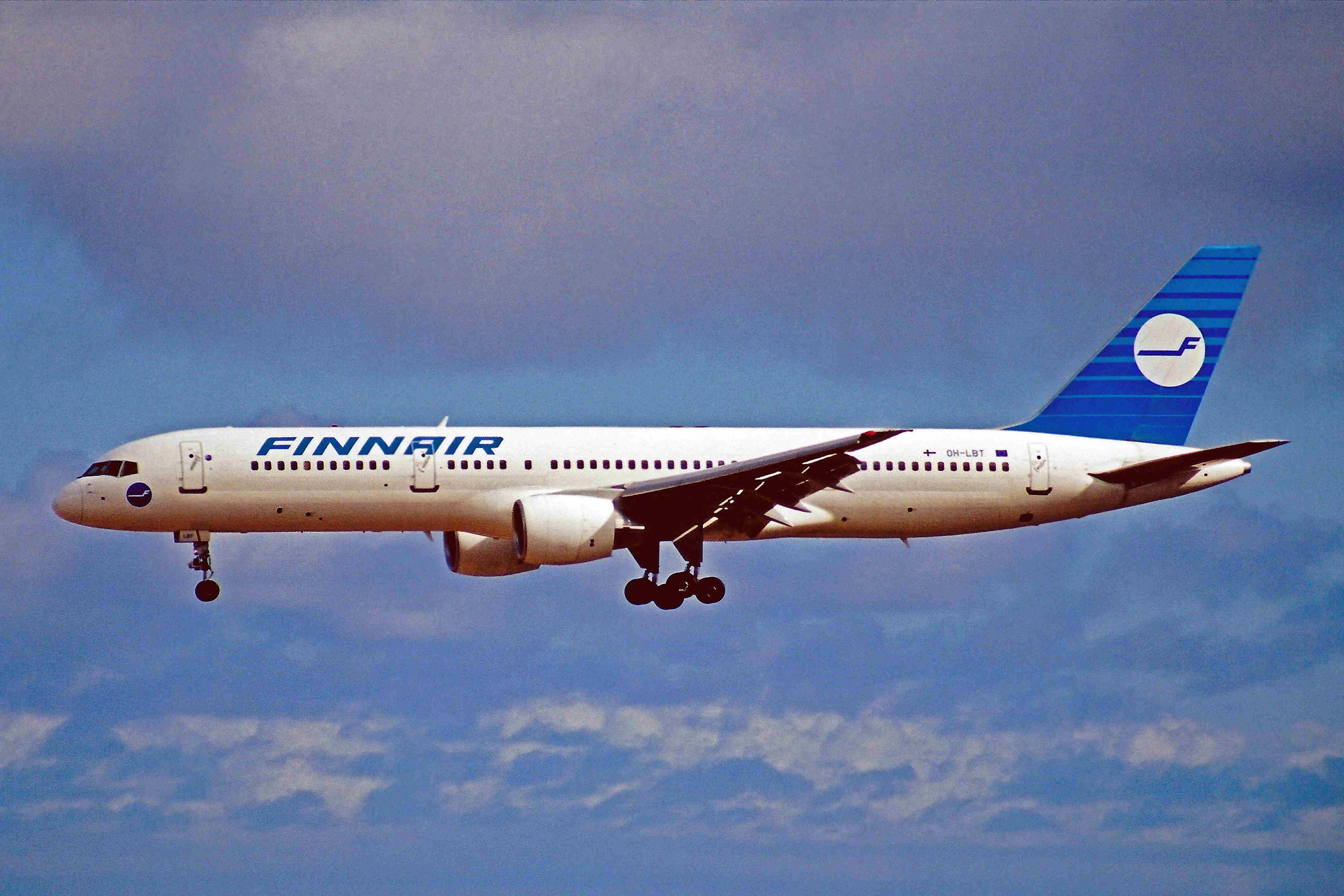
Boeing 757-200 in the 1990s colours

In 1997, the subsidiaries Kar-Air and Finnaviation became wholly owned by Finnair and were integrated into the mainline operations. On 25 September 1997, the company's official name was changed to Finnair Oyj.

In 1999, Finnair joined the Oneworld airline alliance. In 2001, Finnair reused the name "Aero" when establishing Aero Airlines, a subsidiary airline based in Tallinn, Estonia.

In 2003, Finnair acquired ownership of the Swedish low-cost airline, FlyNordic, which operated mainly within Scandinavia. In 2007, Finnair sold all its shares in FlyNordic to Norwegian Air Shuttle. As part of the transaction, Finnair acquired 4.8% of the latter company, becoming its third largest shareholder. Finnair later sold their shares in 2013.

In 2006, Finnair ordered 11 Airbus A350 aircraft including an additional 8 options, with deliveries starting in 2015.

=== Labour disputes and restructuring (2006–present) ===
Finnair has suffered from many labour disputes in this period, resulting from cost-cutting measures prompted by competition from budget airlines.

On 1 December 2011, Finnair transferred its baggage and apron services to Swissport International as per a five-year agreement signed on 7 November 2011.

As of 2022, it transported about 2.9 million passengers, a substantial decrease from 2019 as COVID-19 pandemic shut down airports and airlines due to travel restrictions. At the end of 2022, the airline employed 5,325 people on average. From 2022 onwards, the Russian airspace closure resulting from the Russian invasion of Ukraine has forced Finnair to suspend some services to Asia.

In March 2023, Finnair announced it would terminate domestic flights from both Tampere and Turku to Helsinki in favour of coach service due to low demand and the short distance.

== Corporate affairs ==
=== Business trends ===
The key trends for Finnair are shown below (for each year ending 31 December):

	Revenue (€ m)	Profit before tax (EBT) (€ m)	Number of employees (Note: on average)	Number of passengers (m)	Passenger load factor (%)	Number of aircraft (Note: on year end)	Notes/ sources
2009	1,838	−125	8,797	7.4	75.9	68	
2010	2,023	−33	7,578	7.1	76.5	63	
2011	2,257	−111	7,467	8.0	73.3	65	
2012	2,449	16.5	6,784	8.8	77.6	60	
2013	2,400	11.9	5,859	9.2	79.5	70	
2014	2,284	−36.5	5,172	9.6	80.2	67	
2015	2,254	23.7	4,906	10.3	80.4	72	
2016	2,316	55.2	5,045	10.8	79.8	73	
2017	2,568	170	5,852	11.9	83.3	79	
2018	2,834	218	6,360	13.2	81.8	81	
2019	3,097	93.0	6,788	14.6	81.7	83	
2020	829	−523	6,573	3.5	63.0	83	(Note: 2020: Activities and income in 2020 were severely reduced by the impact of the coronavirus pandemic.)
2021	838	−582	5,614	2.9	42.8	84	
2022	2,357	−371	5,336	9.1	62.4	80	
2023	2,988	119	5,195	11.0	76.4	79	
2024	3,049	46	5,533	11.7	75.8	80	
2025	3,106	23.3	5,779	11.9	76.9	79	

=== Ownership and structure ===
The group's parent company is Finnair Plc, which is listed on the Nasdaq Helsinki Stock Exchange and domiciled in Helsinki at the registered address Tietotie 9, Vantaa. As of March 2026, the State of Finland is the majority shareholder with 55.68% of shares, in line with the States mandate to hold at least 50.10% of shares. Skandinaviska Enskilda Banken is the second largest shareholder with 11.02%, whilst no other entity holds more than 3% of shares.

=== Head office ===
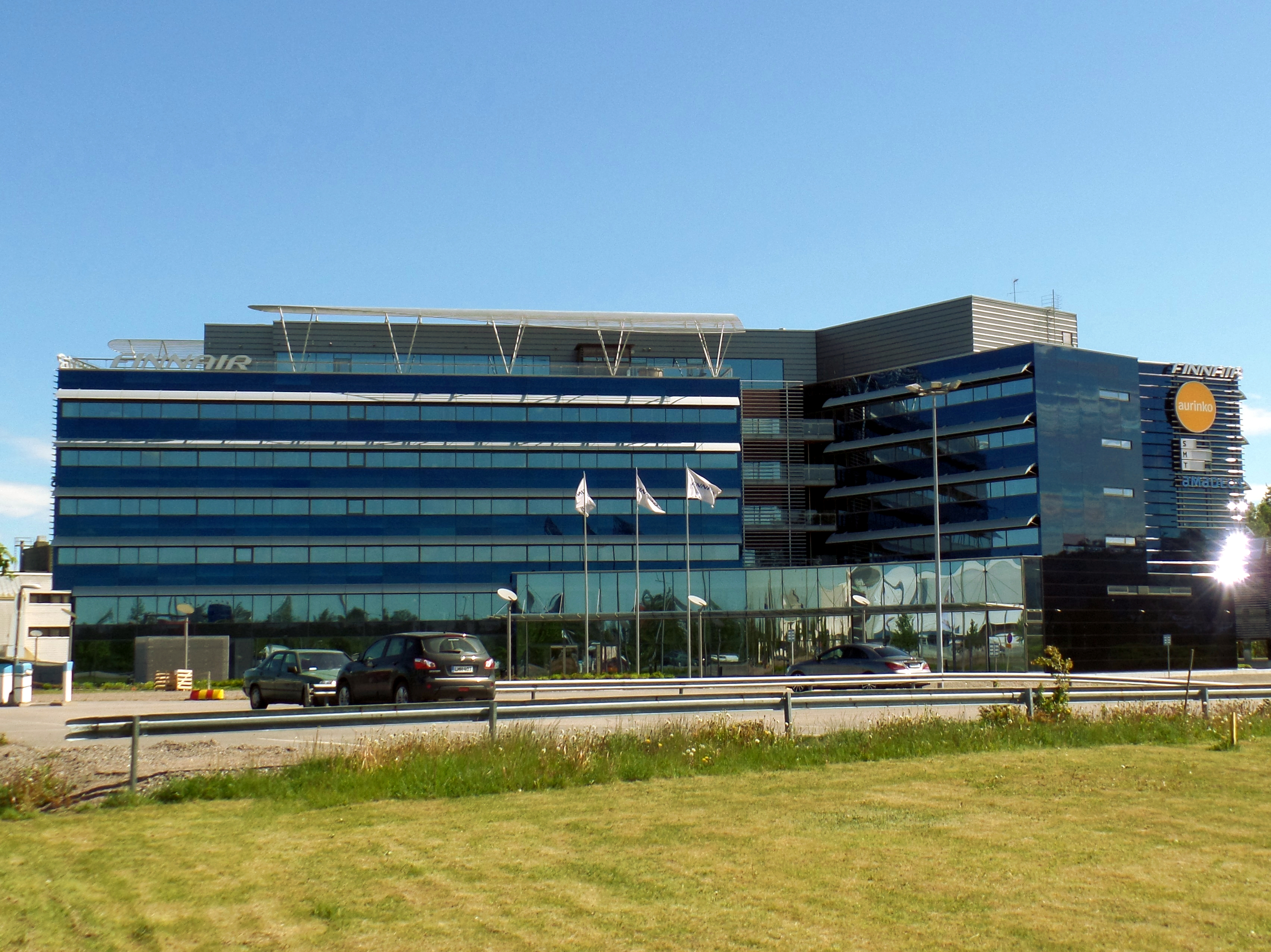
Headquarters, known as "House of Travel and Transportation"

Finnair's head office, known as the House of Travel and Transportation (or "HOTT"), is located on the grounds of Helsinki Airport approximately 1 km south of the passenger terminal. The office opened in 2013, replacing the previous head office which stood on an adjacent lot. The mixed-use building has a total floor area of 70,000 square metres (750,000 sq ft) across seven floors, including 22,400 square metres (241,000 sq ft) of office space.

The previous airport head office had been in use since 1994, then replacing an office located in central Helsinki. The last Helsinki head office, designed by architect Aarne Ehojoki, opened in 1972. Finnair fully vacated the building in 2013, and in 2016, it was converted into rental storage units.

=== Subsidiaries and associates ===
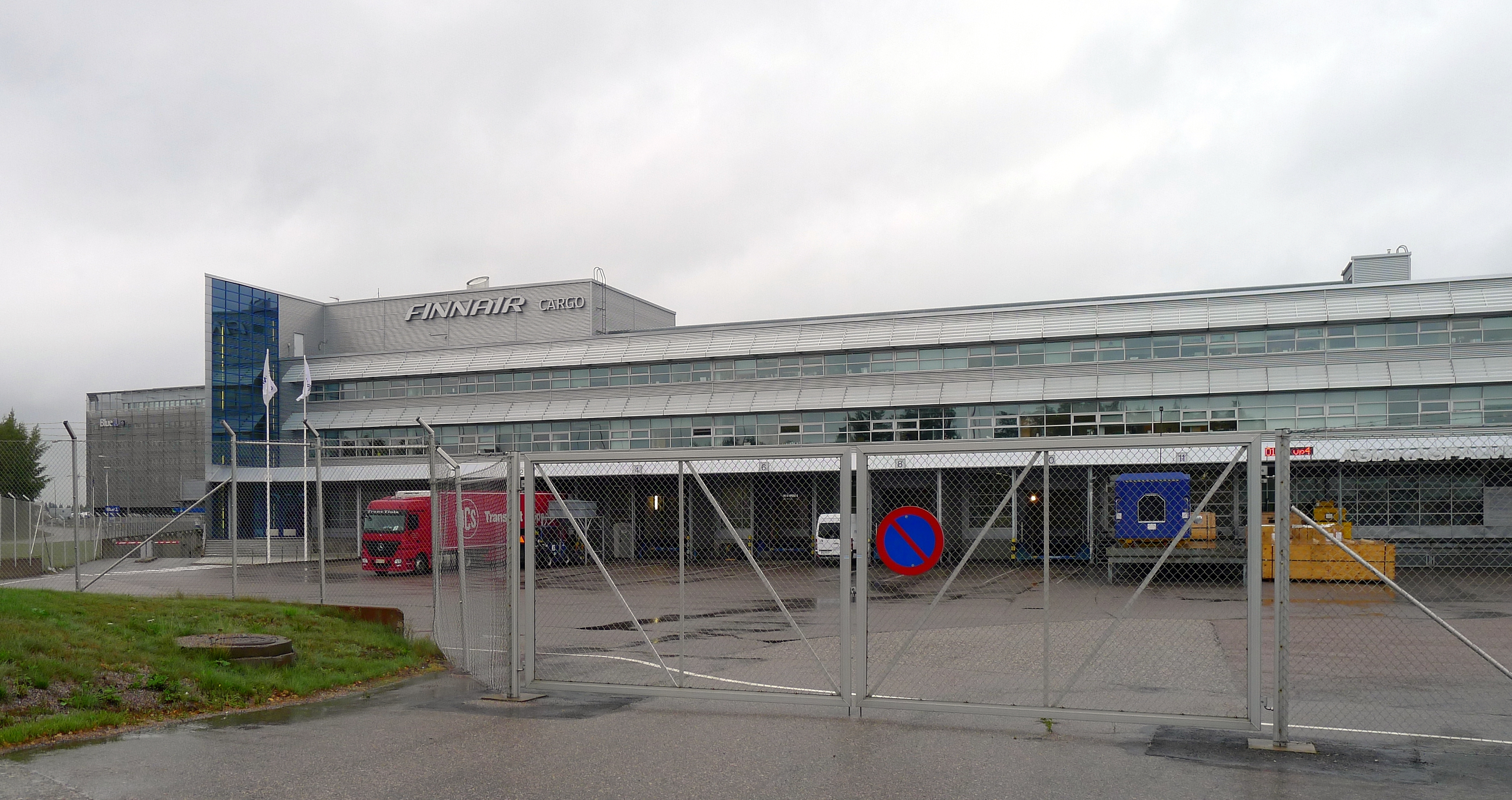
Cargo building

==== Finnair Cargo ====
Two subsidiary companies, Finnair Cargo Oy and Finnair Cargo Terminal Operations Oy, form Finnair's cargo business. The offices of both companies are at Helsinki Airport. Finnair Cargo uses Finnair's fleet on its cargo operations.

Finnair Cargo has three hubs:

- Helsinki Airport: Helsinki Airport is the main hub of Finnair Cargo. There is a new freight terminal at the airport, opened in the first half of 2017.
- Brussels Airport: Finnair Cargo has used Brussels Airport as a secondary hub for freight operations. Now the cargo airline operates its flights from BRU in co-operation with DHL Aviation (EAT Leipzig).
- London Heathrow Airport: Heathrow Airport is the most recent hub addition to Finnair Cargo's route network. In cooperation with IAG Cargo, Finnair operates to LHR daily with Airbus A350 to carry extra freight.

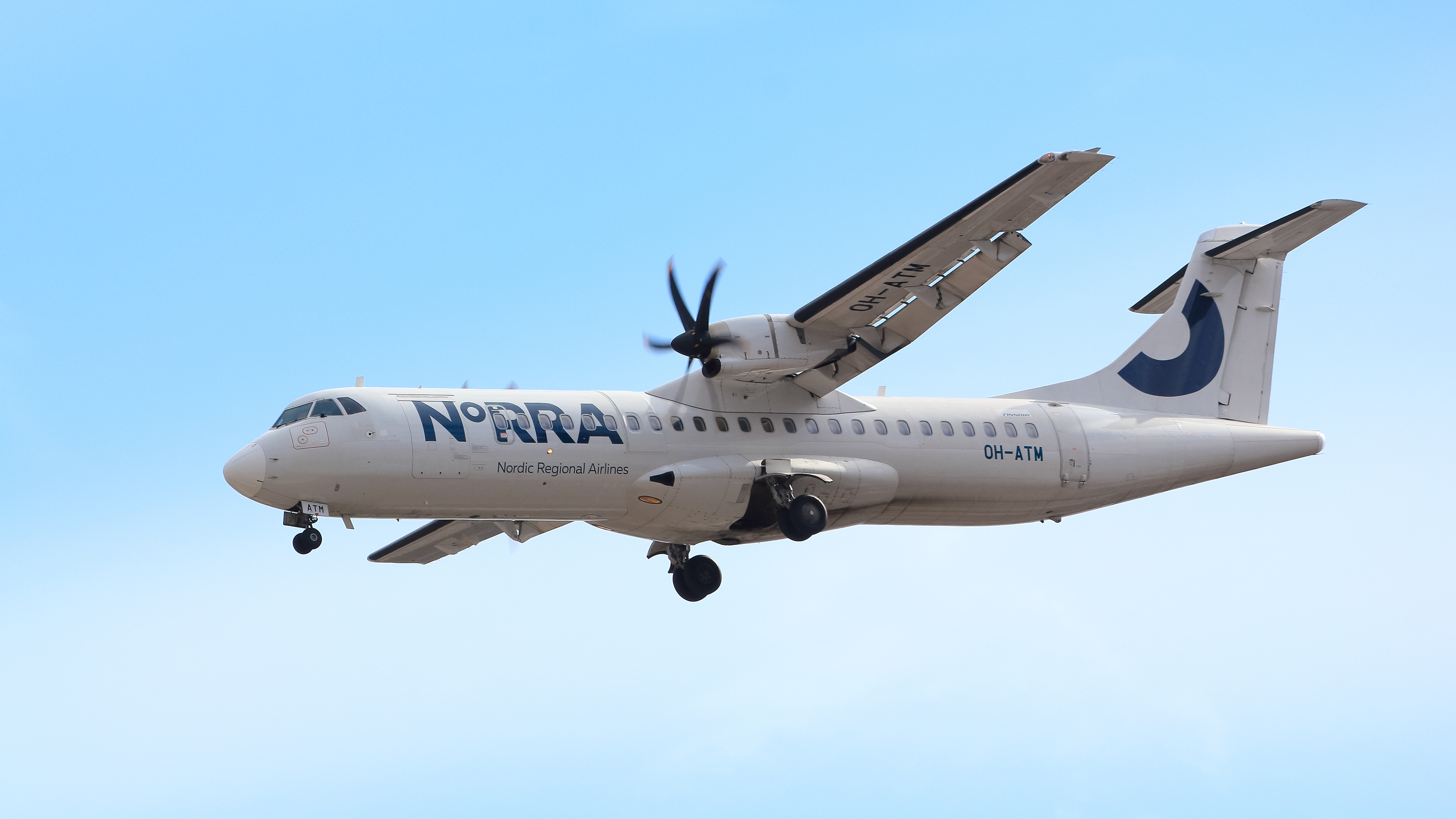
An ATR 72-500 in Nordic Regional Airlines/N°RRA livery

==== Nordic Regional Airlines ====
Nordic Regional Airlines (Norra) is 40% owned by Finnair. The airline uses a fleet of ATR 72-500 aircraft, leased from Finnair, and Embraer E190 aircraft, both painted in Finnair livery. The airline began operations on 20 October 2011 as a joint venture between Flybe and Finnair. The airline has operated under Finnair's flight code since 1 May 2015.

=== Corporate image ===
==== Livery ====
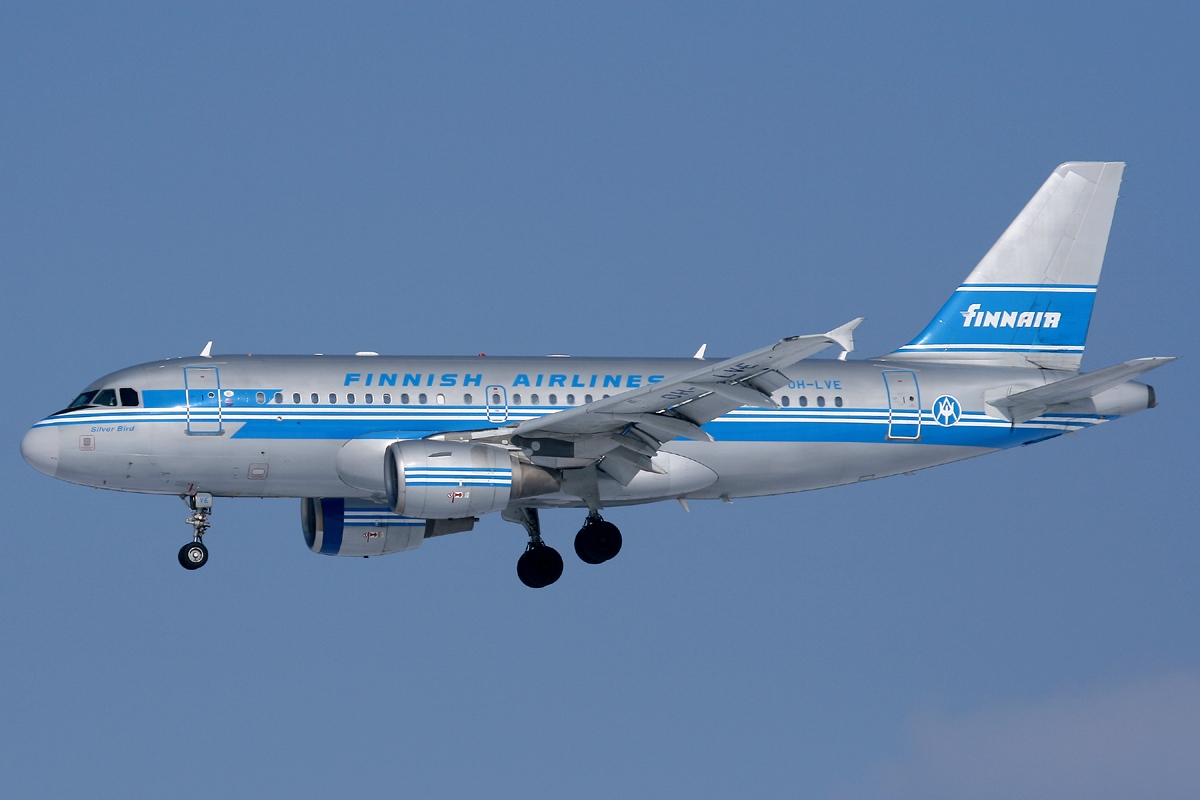
A319-100 in retro (Aero O/Y) livery

The company revealed a new livery in December 2010. Major changes include a restyled and larger lettering on the aircraft body, repainting of the engines in white, and a reversal of the colour scheme for the tail fin favouring a white background with a blue stylised logo. The outline of the globe was also removed from the tail fin.

==== Flight attendant uniforms ====
The current uniform was designed by Ritva-Liisa Pohjalainen and launched in December 2011. Finnair has codes to indicate the rank of crew members: one stripe in the sleeve (or epaulettes in the case of male crew wearing vests) for normal Cabin Crew, two stripes for Senior Cabin Crew (only for outsourced Spanish crew) acting as a Purser, and three stripes for a Purser/Chief Purser. Additionally, some female Pursers have a white vertical stripe on their dresses or blouses indicating their years of service. Finnair requires its cabin crew to wear gloves during take-off and landing for safety reasons. Finnair's previous cabin crew uniform was named the fifth most stylish uniform by the French magazine Bon Voyage.

=== Partnerships ===
Finnair has several partnerships with following companies and airlines including Alaska Airlines, American Airlines, British Airways, Deutsche Bahn (DB), Chinese JD.com, Japan Airlines and Marimekko.

=== Joint ventures ===
Finnair has joint venture agreements with the following airlines:

- American Airlines
- British Airways
- Iberia
- Japan Airlines
- Juneyao Air

=== Codeshare agreements ===
Finnair codeshares with the following airlines:

- Air France
- Air Serbia
- Alaska Airlines
- American Airlines
- Bangkok Airways
- British Airways
- Cathay Pacific
- China Southern Airlines
- Fiji Airways
- Iberia
- Icelandair
- Japan Airlines
- Jetstar
- Juneyao Air
- LATAM Brasil
- LATAM Chile
- Level
- Malaysia Airlines
- Oman Air
- Qantas
- Qatar Airways
- SriLankan Airlines
- TAP Air Portugal
- Turkish Airlines
- Vietnam Airlines
- Widerøe

=== Interline agreements ===
Finnair has interline agreements with the following airlines:

- Air China
- Loganair
- Singapore Airlines

== Destinations ==
Finnair flies from its Helsinki hub to over 80 destinations in over 35 countries in Asia, Europe and North America. Finnair also serves six destinations in the United States. Previously, the airline has served Africa and South America, including countries such as Egypt, Colombia and Brazil, but primarily on a leisure basis. Finnair has over 10 domestic destinations. Domestic flights are operated in co-operation with the airline's subsidiary Nordic Regional Airlines.

In 2021, Finnair opened five routes from Stockholm–Arlanda to Bangkok–Suvarnabhumi and Phuket in Thailand, as well as New York–JFK, Miami and Los Angeles in the United States. Those routes have been discontinued.

On 28 February 2022, Russia closed its airspace as a countermeasure to EU airspace closure. This meant many changes to Finnair's Asian services, as most of Finnair's flights between Europe and Asia had used the shortest, fastest, and most environmentally sound route over Russia. In response, on 9 March 2022, flight AY073 departed from Helsinki to Tokyo Narita via the North Pole. Back in 1983, Finnair was the first airline to fly non-stop from Europe to Japan by flying over the North Pole – so operating in the polar region is not new to Finnair.

Finnair announced a new route to Dallas/Fort Worth in 2022. Finnair also reintroduced flights to Seattle/Tacoma in 2022.

== Fleet ==
As of July 2026, Finnair operates the following aircraft:

Finnair fleet
Aircraft	In service	Orders	Passengers					Notes
Aircraft	In service	Orders	J	W	Y	Total	Refs	Notes
Airbus A319-100	5	—	—	—	144	144		To be retired.
Airbus A320-200	10	TBD	—	—	174	174		Finnair plans to acquire up to 12 second-hand Airbus A320 and A321 aircraft to replace the Airbus A319 and older A320 aircraft though unspecified how much will be A320 and A321.
Airbus A321-200	14	TBD	TBD	—	209	209		Finnair plans to acquire up to 12 second-hand Airbus A320 and A321 aircraft to replace the Airbus A319 and older A320 aircraft though unspecified how much will be A320 and A321.
Airbus A330-300	6	—	28	21	230	279		Two additional aircraft (OH-LTR and OH-LTU) dry-leased to Qantas.
Airbus A350-900	10	1	43	24	211	278		
Airbus A350-900	8	1	30	26	265	321		
Total	53	1						

As of July 2026, Nordic Regional Airlines operates the following aircraft for Finnair:

Aircraft	In service	Orders	Passengers					Notes
Aircraft	In service	Orders	J	W	Y	Total	Refs	Notes
ATR 72-500	12	—	—	—	68	68		—
ATR 72-500	12	—	—	—	72	72		—
ATR 72-600	—	2	TBA					Deliveries from 2026.
Embraer E190	12	2	12	—	88	100		Deliveries from 2026.
Embraer E195-E2	—	18	TBA					Order includes 16 options and 12 purchase rights. Deliveries from 2027 onwards.
Total	24	22						

=== Gallery ===
Finnair current fleet

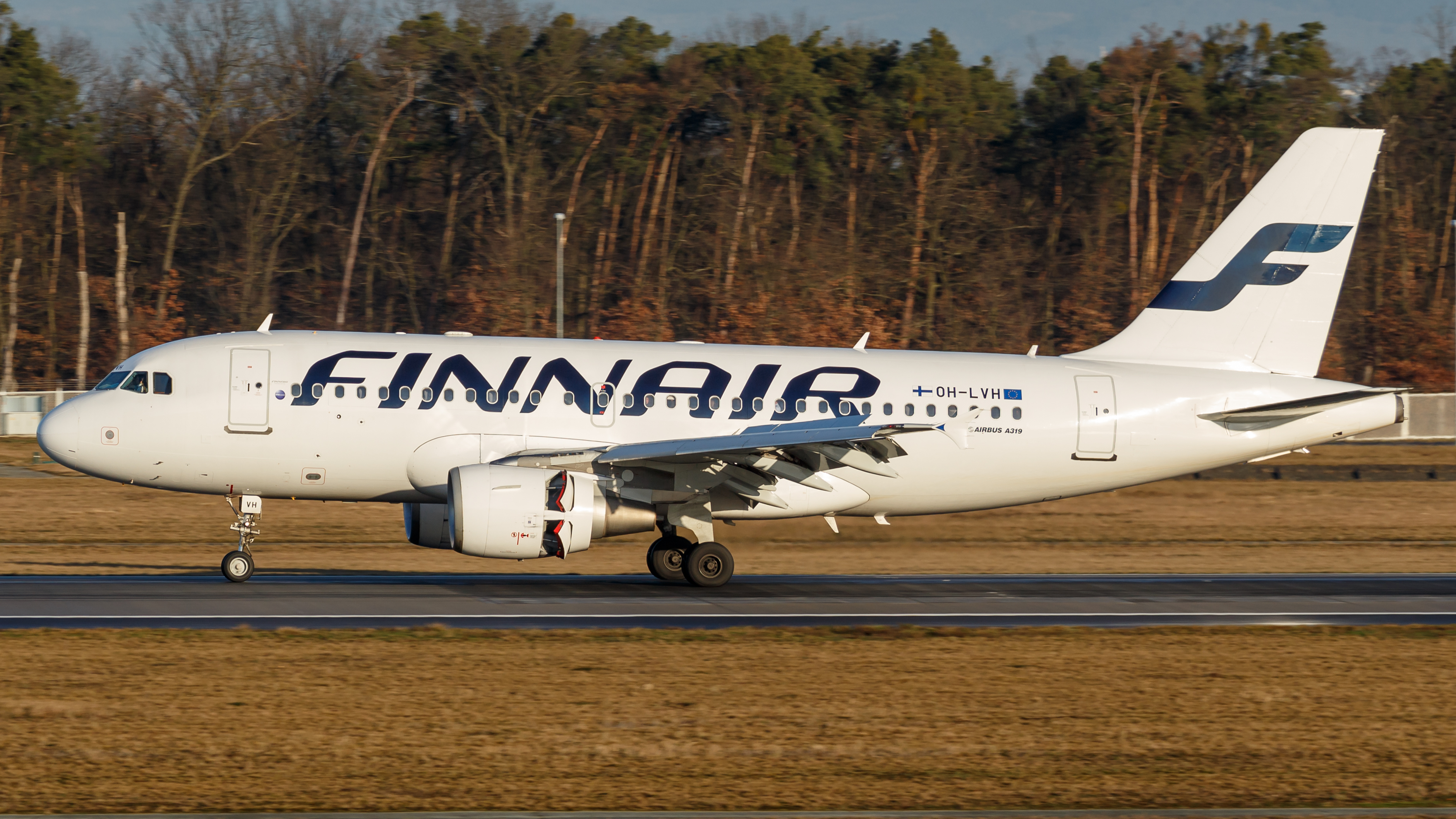
Airbus A319-100

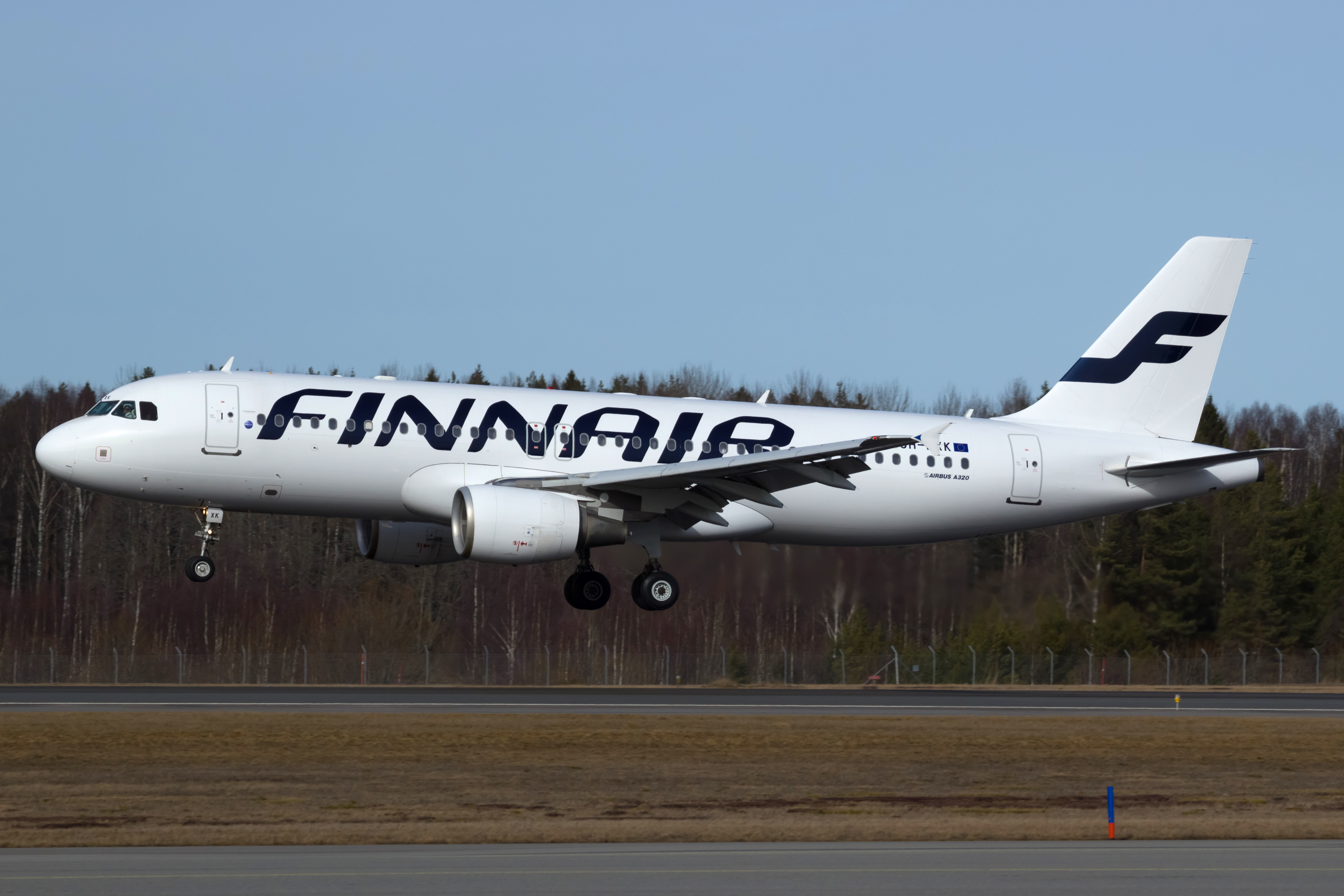
Airbus A320-200

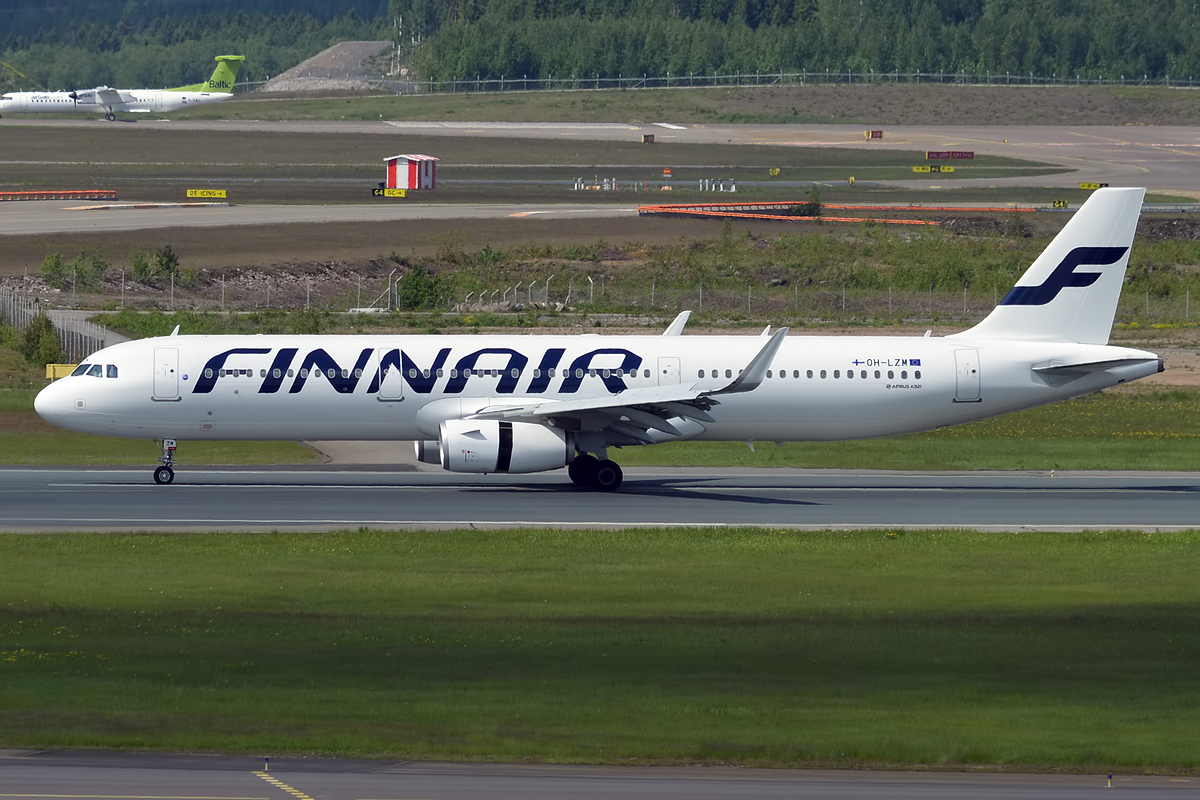
Airbus A321-200

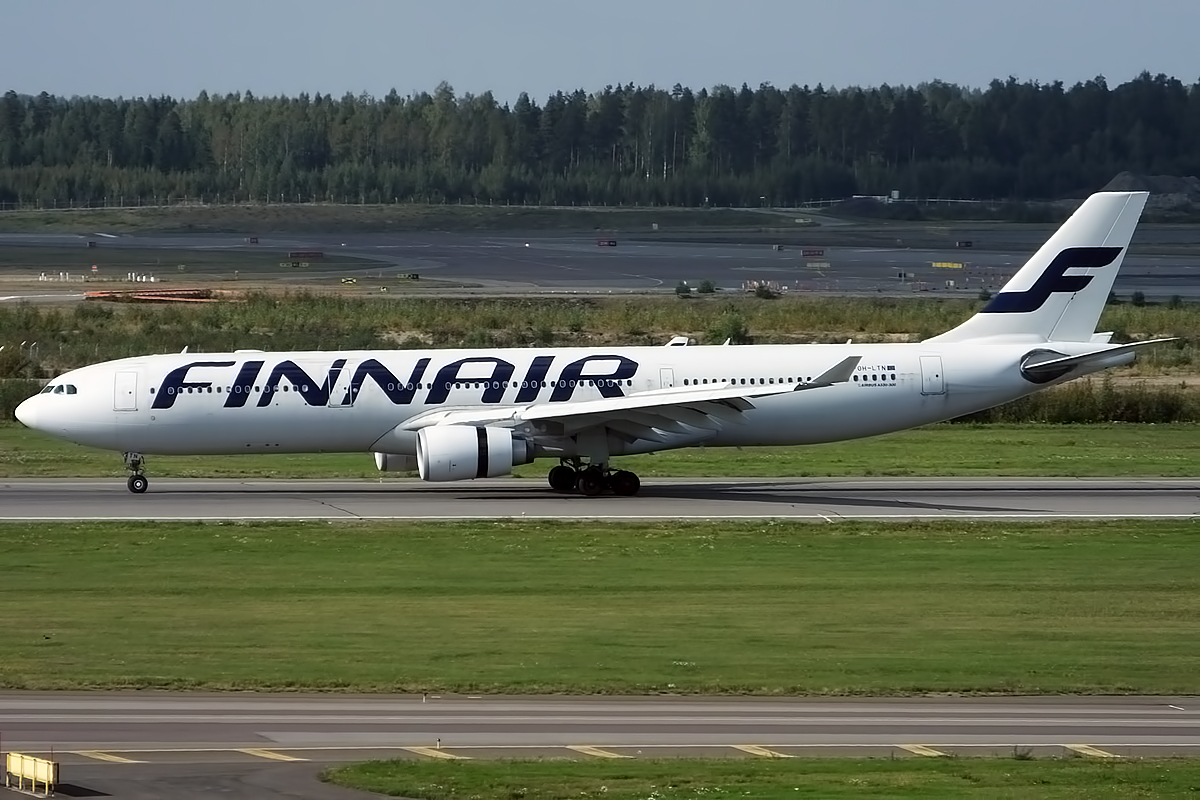
Airbus A330-300

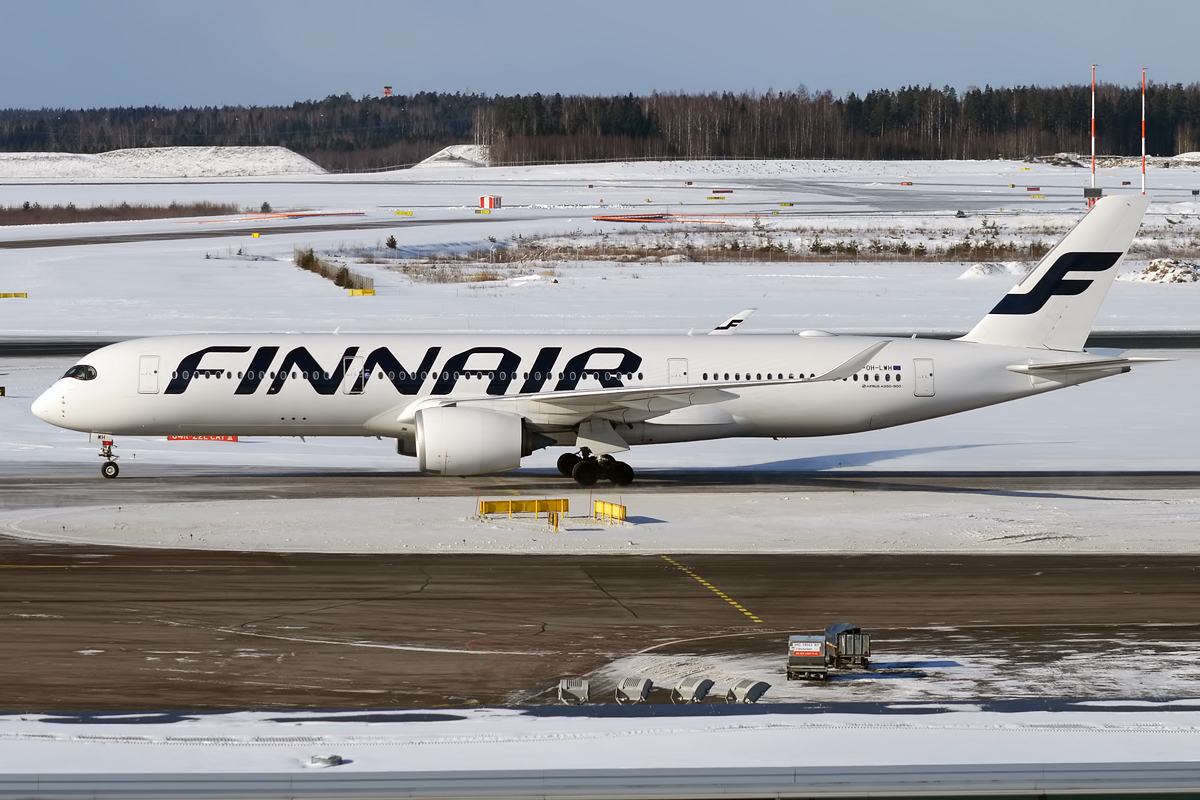
Airbus A350-900

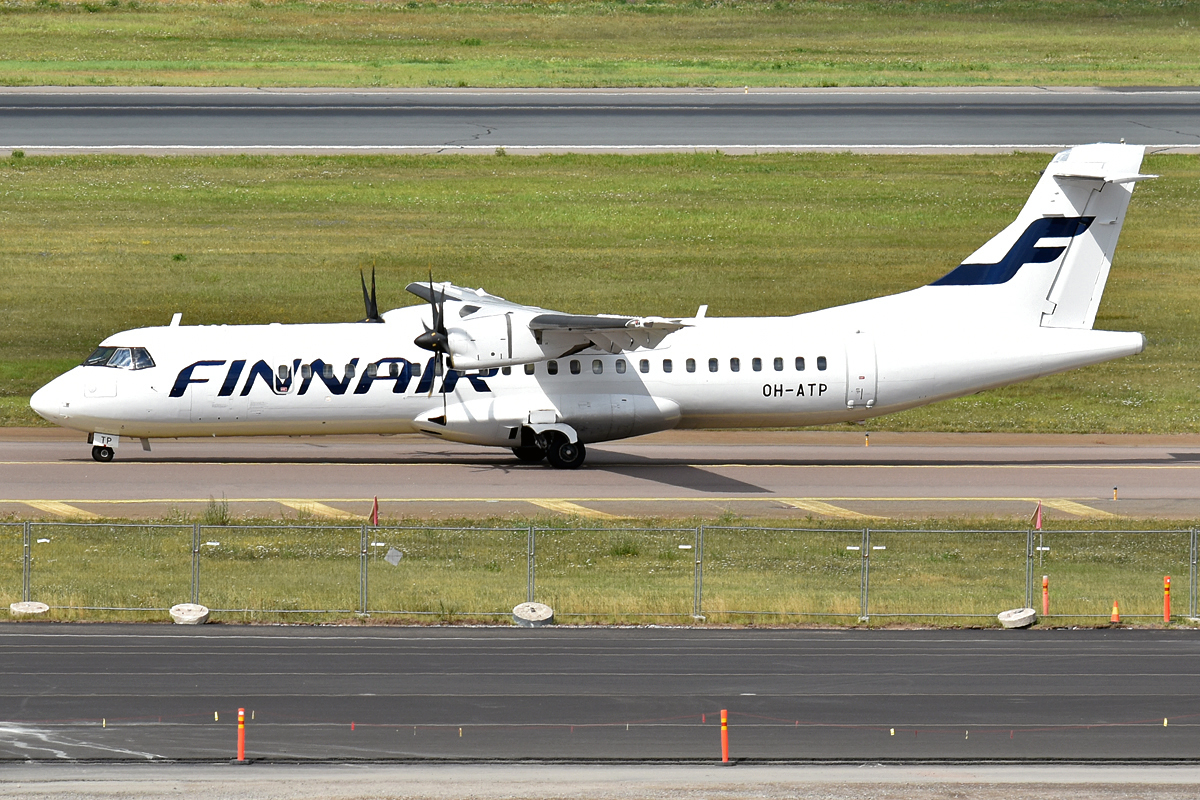
ATR 72-500 operated by Nordic Regional Airlines

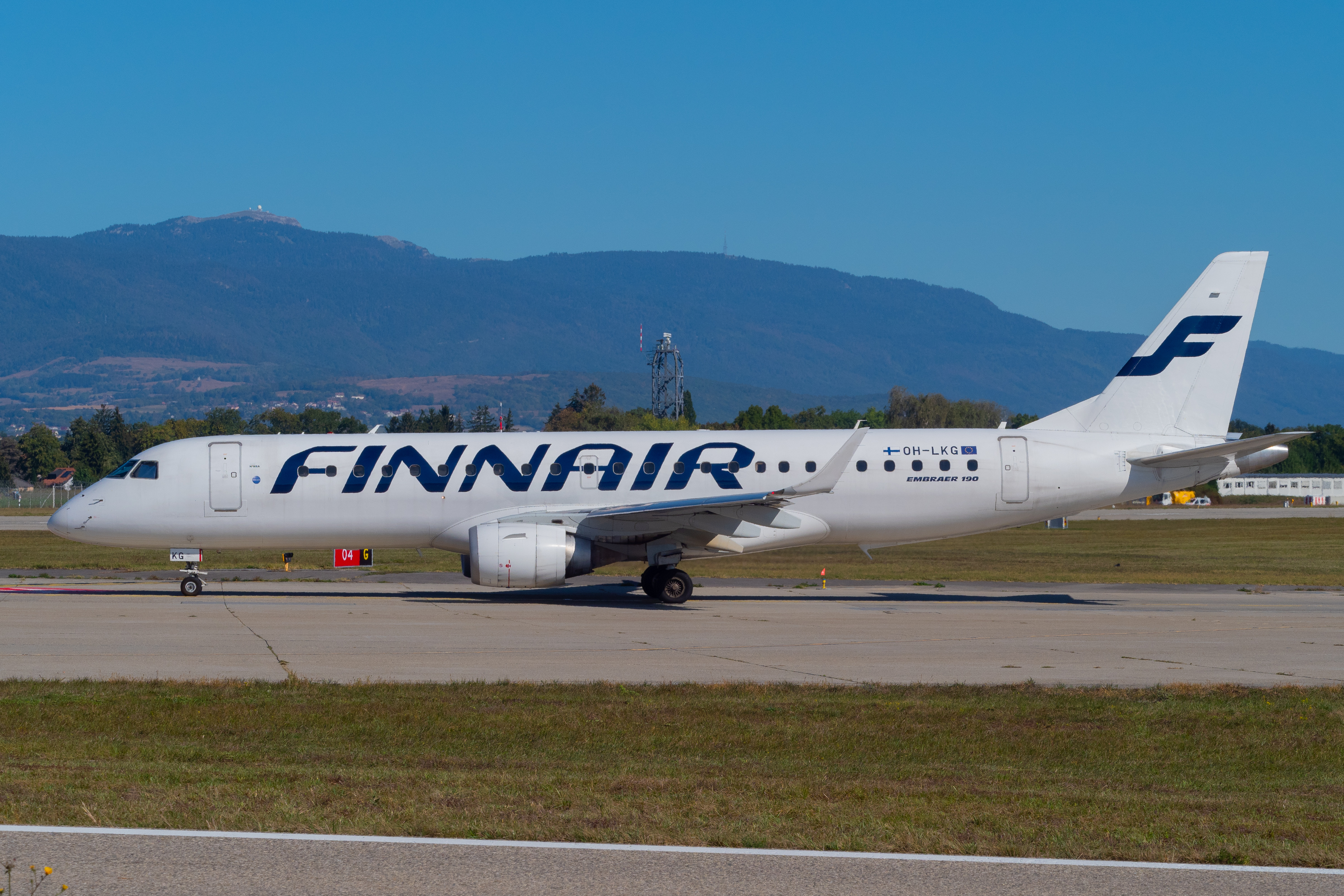
Embraer ERJ-190 operated by Nordic Regional Airlines

=== Aircraft types ===
==== Airbus A319, A320 and A321 ====
Finnair received its first narrow-body aircraft manufactured by Airbus, the Airbus A321, on 28 January 1999. Now, the airline operates a fleet of up to 15 A321s. The first Airbus A319 aircraft was delivered to Finnair on 20 September 1999. Since then, Finnair has received 11 A319s, but three of them are now retired. Finnair utilises Airbus A319, A320, and A321 aircraft on domestic and European flights. The Airbus A321-231 aircraft, which are equipped with Sharklets, are also used on some thinner long-haul flights such as to Dubai. ATR 72-500 and Embraer E190 are operated by Nordic Regional Airlines and are also used on domestic and European flights.

==== Airbus A330 ====
Finnair received its first batch of Airbus A330-300s on 27 March 2009. Now the airline has eight of them in its fleet. As of July 2023, the airline utilises the A330 on intercontinental flights from Helsinki to Delhi, Mumbai, New York, Chicago, Seattle and Doha. The A330s are powered by General Electric CF6-80E1 engines. The aircraft are also being used on European services to Brussels and Amsterdam.

==== Airbus A350 ====
In 2006, Finnair placed an order for 11 Airbus A350 aircraft with 8 additional options. On 3 December 2014, Finnair announced that it had exercised the option for eight additional A350 aircraft, with deliveries starting in 2018. Finnair took delivery of OH-LWA, its first A350, on 7 October 2015, becoming the third airline to operate the type after Qatar Airways and Vietnam Airlines. As of March 2026, Finnair has taken delivery of 18 A350 aircraft, with delivery of the 19th and final A350 scheduled for delivery in the latter half of 2026.

On 21 November 2016, the first intercontinental Finnair A350 service left Helsinki for Shanghai as AY57. Finnair mainly deploys the A350 on intercontinental routes, such as Helsinki to Bangkok, Hong Kong, Los Angeles, Nagoya, Osaka, Phuket, Seoul, Shanghai, Singapore, Tokyo Haneda and Tokyo Narita. Additionally, Finnair frequently operates the A350 on intra-European routes, such as Helsinki to London–Heathrow (AY1331/AY1332 and AY1337/AY1338) and Helsinki to Gran Canaria (AY1721/AY1722) for added passenger and/or freight capacity and range. The A350 also operates, albeit seldomly, flights from Helsinki to Amsterdam, Munich and Brussels.

=== Fleet development ===
==== Upcoming narrow-body fleet renewal ====
Due to an aging narrow-body fleet, Finnair plans to retire the Airbus A320 family and replace them with new generation aircraft. The airline estimates to invest up to €4 billion in fleet renewal between 2020 and 2025. Revealed at its Capital Markets Day on 12 November 2019, Finnair plans to grow the size of its fleet from the current 83 (as of November 2019) to approximately 100 by 2025, of which 70% is planned to be narrow-body aircraft and 30% wide-body aircraft. One-third of the total investment sum would be used for growth, while two-thirds would be to replace the current fleet. According to Bloomberg, Finnair will replace the old aircraft with either Airbus A320neo family or Boeing 737 MAX new generation aircraft. The carrier has also revealed that it is looking for suitable narrow-body aircraft for long-haul use.

On 18 December 2015, Finnair announced a EUR 40 million investment in reconfiguring the seating of aircraft in it Airbus narrow-body fleet, which would add 6 to 13 seats to each. Finnair also planned to increase its narrow-body fleet. As a first step, Finnair leased eight Airbus A321 narrow-body aircraft from BOC Aviation.

Finnair has occasionally suffered from aircraft shortages and therefore has resorted to leased and wet-leased aircraft. For instance, in March 2016, Finnair announced it would lease two Airbus A321 aircraft from Air Berlin for Finnair's European operations. These two aircraft were delivered in late April 2016 to Finnair. The airline used these A321s on flights from Helsinki to Amsterdam, Berlin, Copenhagen, Dubrovnik, Düsseldorf, Ljubljana, Paris, Split, Vienna, and Zürich. On 15 December 2016, Finnair announced it would lease two Airbus A321s from CDB Aviation Lease Finance. The first aircraft was scheduled for delivery to Finnair for the 2017-2018 winter season and the second for the 2018 summer season. Seven of the ordered aircraft were delivered in 2017.

The Finnair-branded short-haul network also includes 24 regional aircraft operated by Nordic Regional Airlines (12 ATR 72 and 12 E-190). In March 2026, Finnair ordered 18 new Embraer E195-E2 aircraft and used Airbus A320ceo to replace retired Airbus A320 fleet. The contract includes 16 options and 12 purchase rights, potentially bringing the E2-fleet to 46 aircraft. Finnair will source 12 A320 aircraft over the next few years. The younger aircraft will replace five A319ceos, with an average age of 24,8 years, plus the oldest A320ceos.

==== Recent wide-body fleet renewal ====
Finnair announced the order for 11 Airbus A350 XWB aircraft and 8 options on 8 March 2007. Finnair planned to retire older Airbus A340 aircraft by the end of 2017 and replace them with brand new A350 aircraft. As of 1 February 2017, all Airbus A340 aircraft are withdrawn from the fleet. The very last A340 (OH-LQE) operated its last flight from Tokyo to Helsinki on 1 February 2017. Finnair firmed up orders for eight additional A350 aircraft on 3 December 2014. The first A350 was delivered to Finnair in October 2015, and the airline became the first European operator of the Airbus A350.

As of November 2019, Finnair had 14 A350-900s, with a further 5 to be delivered between 2020 and 2022. The Finnish flag carrier also has considered switching some of the orders for the Airbus A350-900 to the Airbus A350-1000 aircraft but decided to keep the orders for only the A350-900. At the beginning of 2017, Finnair revealed plans to add more seats to some of the Airbus A350 aircraft in order to increase capacity by up to 13%. The new seat configuration has 32 seats in Business Class, 42 seats in Economy Comfort Class, and 262 in Economy Class, a total of 336 seats. This second seat configuration was initially planned to be used on routes with less business class demand such as Bangkok, Beijing, and Seoul, as well as on routes to leisure destinations but they have also been utilised on other busy routes such as Shanghai, Osaka, and Tokyo.

Finnair has modified its previous fleet plan to retire two of Airbus A330 aircraft, which was established in 2014. The 2016 fleet plan now involves keeping its A330 fleet as its A350s are delivered, rather than withdrawing two of them in 2017, and shall retire those aircraft sometime in the 2020s at the earliest. The airline's plan to retire two A330s was not the only change that was planned. Under the previous plan, the long-haul fleet was to grow by one per year, from 15 in 2015 to 20 in 2020. Under the 2016 plan, it was planned to grow to 22 in 2020, and to 26 in 2023. However, should market conditions be weaker than expected, Finnair has the flexibility to return the wide-body fleet to a total of 15 aircraft in 2019 and to maintain it at this level through to 2023. Some of the new A350 aircraft will increase the number of aircraft operated by Finnair.

=== Special liveries ===
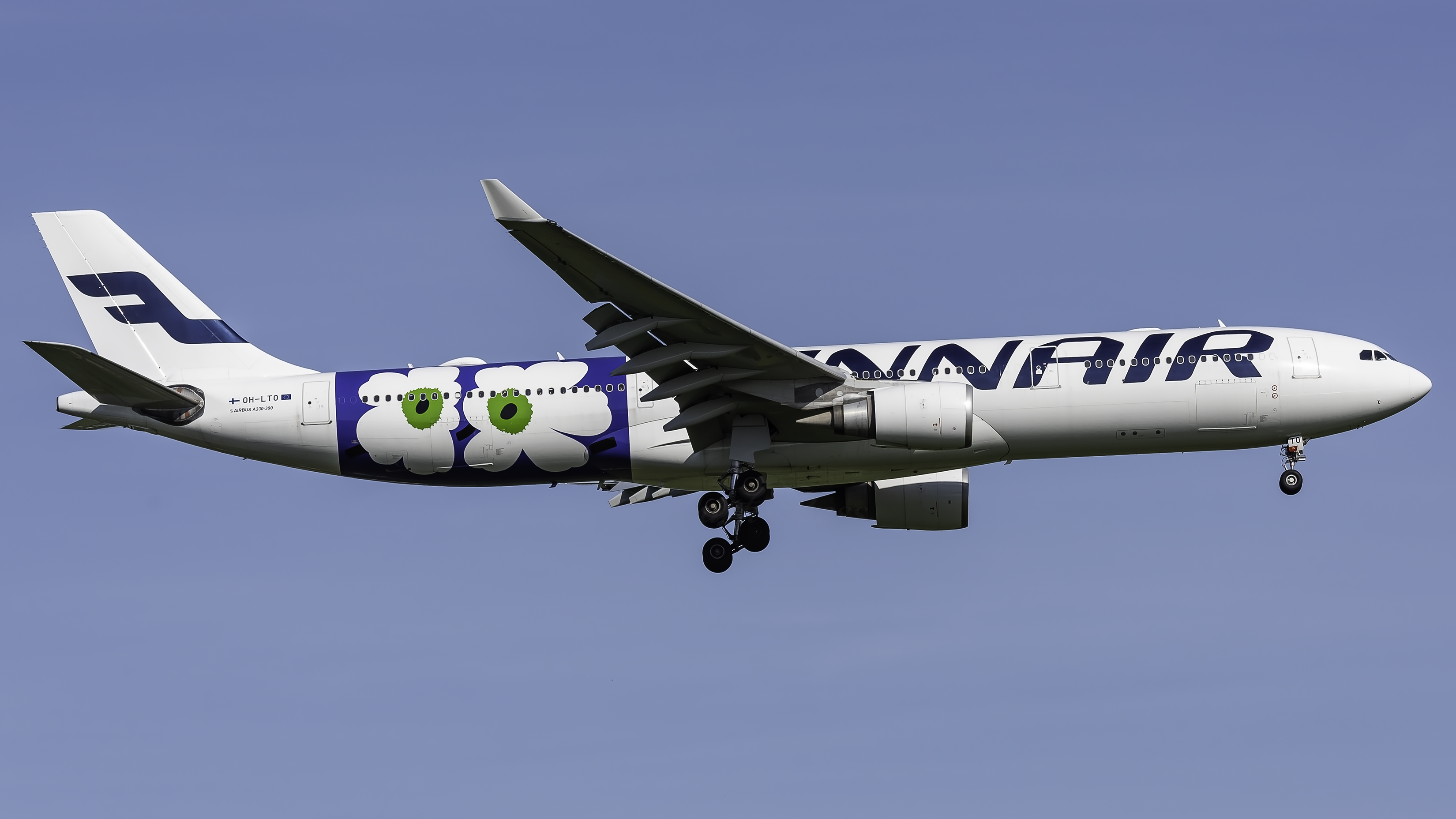
The Marimekko Unikko livery on an Airbus A330 OH-LTO

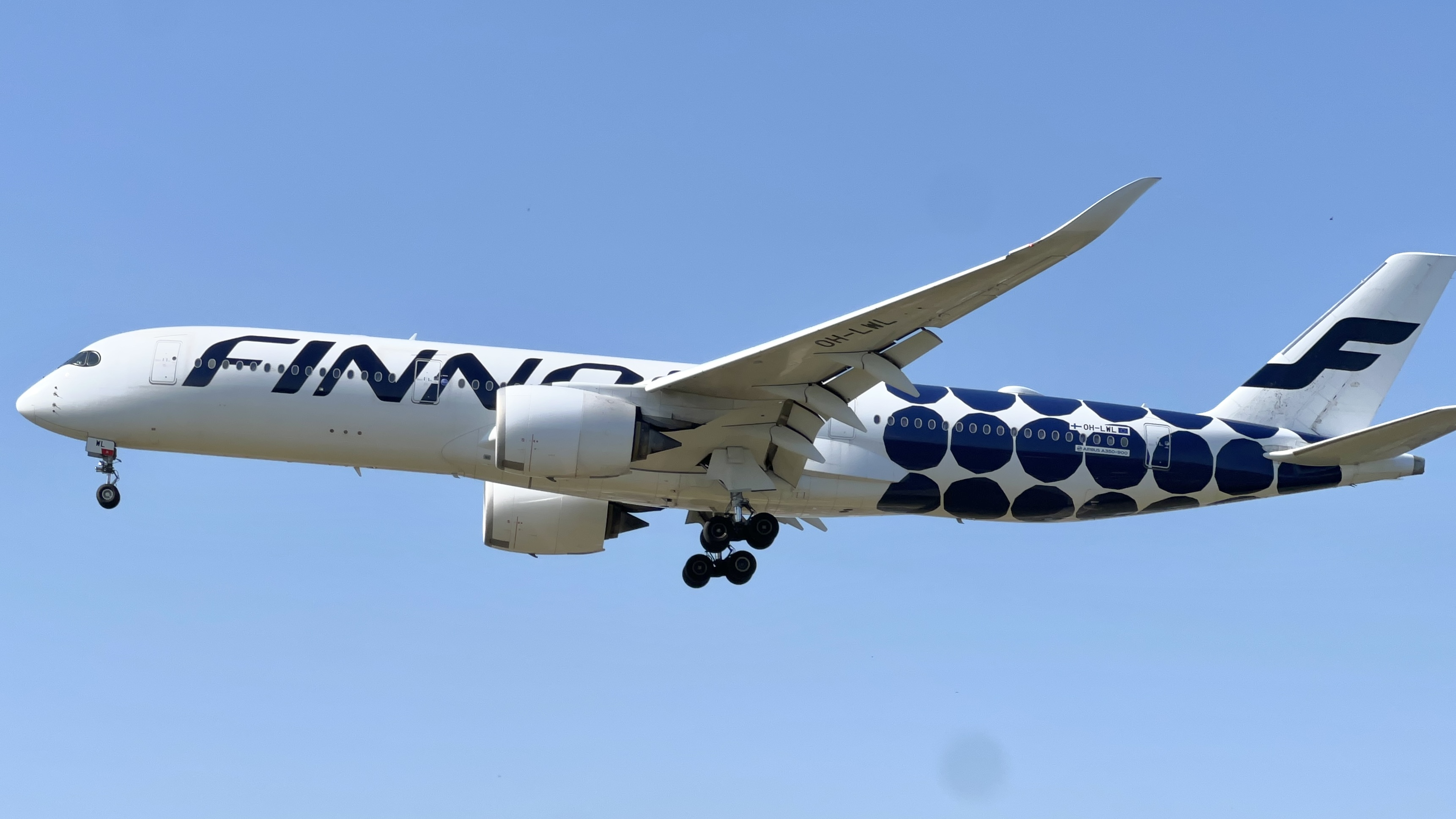
The Marimekko Kivet Livery on an Airbus A350-900 OH-LWL

Finnair has a long tradition of cooperation with the Finnish design house Marimekko, which can be seen both inside and outside of Finnair's aircraft. Two aircraft, OH-LTO and OH-LWL, are currently painted in the Unikko (poppy) and Kivet (stones) patterns respectively. The Marimekko Metsänväki (forest folk) pattern was painted on an Airbus A330 registration OH-LTM, but was removed after the pattern was revealed to be a copy.

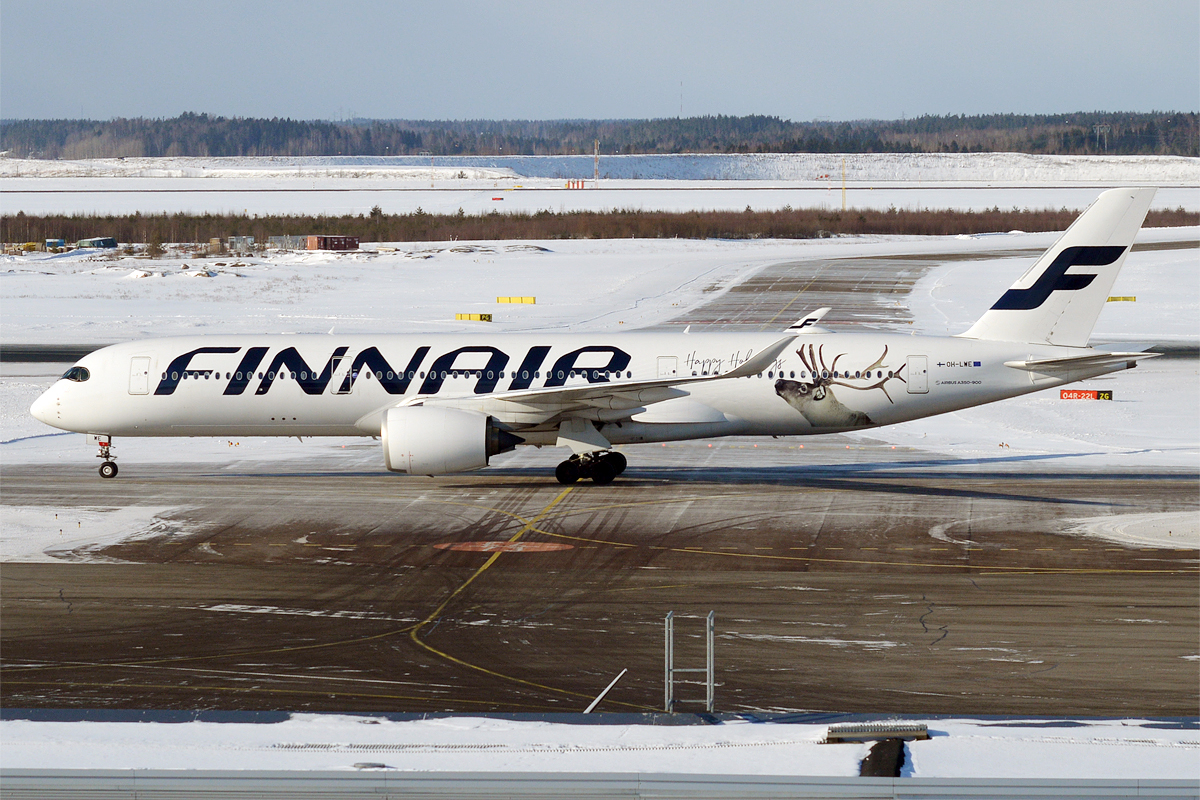
The Happy Holidays livery on an Airbus A350 OH-LWE (the same livery was also featured OH-LWD)

Elements of Finnish culture, such as Christmas, Finnish nature, the Moomins and Angry Birds have been featured in special liveries on Finnair aircraft.

=== Historical fleet ===
Finnair has previously operated the following equipment:

Aircraft	Total	Introduced	Retired	Notes
ATR 42-300	6	1986	1990	
ATR 72-200	9	1995	2005	Transferred to Aero Airlines.
Airbus A300B4-200FF	2	1990	1998	
Airbus A340-300	7	2006	2017	Last commercial service was on 1 February 2017. Replaced by Airbus A350-900.
Boeing 737-200	2	1989	1993	Leased from Air Atlanta Icelandic.
Boeing 757-200	7	1997	2014	Replaced by Airbus A321-200.
Convair CV-340	4	1953	1980	
Convair CV-440	5	1956	1980	
de Havilland Dragon Rapide	2	1937	1944	
Douglas DC-2	2	1941	1948	
Douglas DC-3	10	1947	1968	
Douglas DC-8-62	1	1975	1984	
Douglas DC-8-62CF	3	1969	1981	One of the aircraft, after changing hands several times, is now the flagship aircraft of the international disaster relief organisation Samaritan's Purse.
Embraer E170	10	2005	2012	
Fokker F27 Friendship	3	1980	1988	
Junkers F.13	4	1924	1935	
Junkers G 24	1	1926	1935	
Junkers Ju 52/3m	4	1932	1949	
McDonnell Douglas DC-9-14	6	1971	1985	
McDonnell Douglas DC-9-15	3	1976	1988	
McDonnell Douglas DC-9-41	6	1981	1996	
McDonnell Douglas DC-9-51	12	1976	2003	
McDonnell Douglas DC-10-30	4	1975	1996	
McDonnell Douglas DC-10-30ER	1	1981	1995	Originally delivered as a DC-10-30, later converted to DC-10-30ER for the Helsinki-Tokyo polar route.
McDonnell Douglas MD-11	5	1990	2010	Launch customer. Replaced by Airbus A340-300. One was in Moomin livery.
McDonnell Douglas MD-11F	2	2010	2011	Transferred to Nordic Global Airlines.
McDonnell Douglas MD-82	10	1983	2006	
McDonnell Douglas MD-83	13	1985	2006	
McDonnell Douglas MD-87	3	1987	2000	
Saab 340	5	1996	2000	
Sud Aviation Caravelle III	4	1960	1965	
Sud Aviation Caravelle 10B Super Caravelle	10	1964	1984	

=== Aero O/Y gallery ===
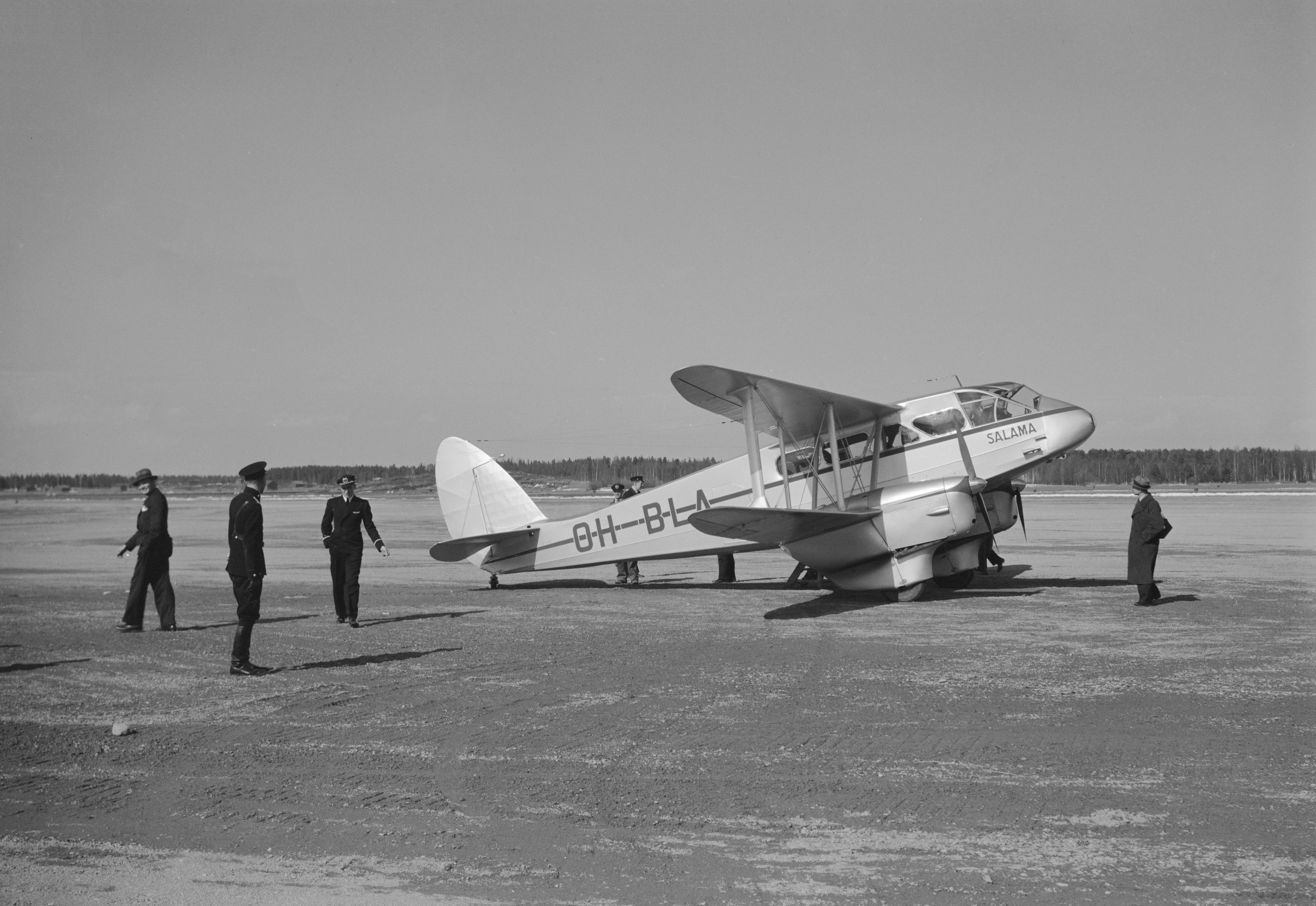
de Havilland Dragon Rapide in 1950

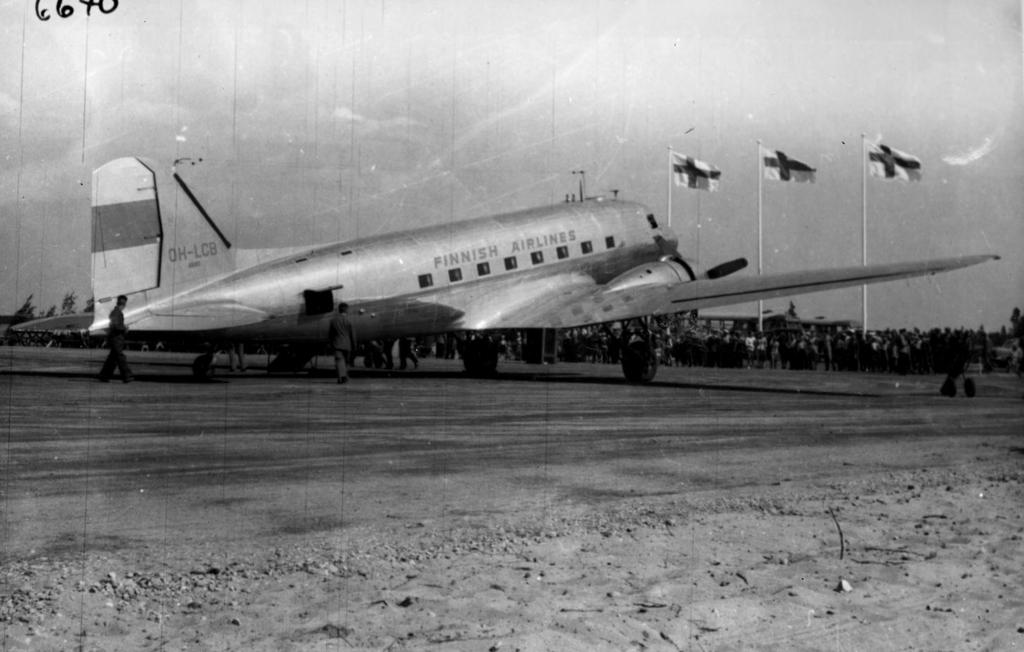
Douglas DC-3 at Oulu airport

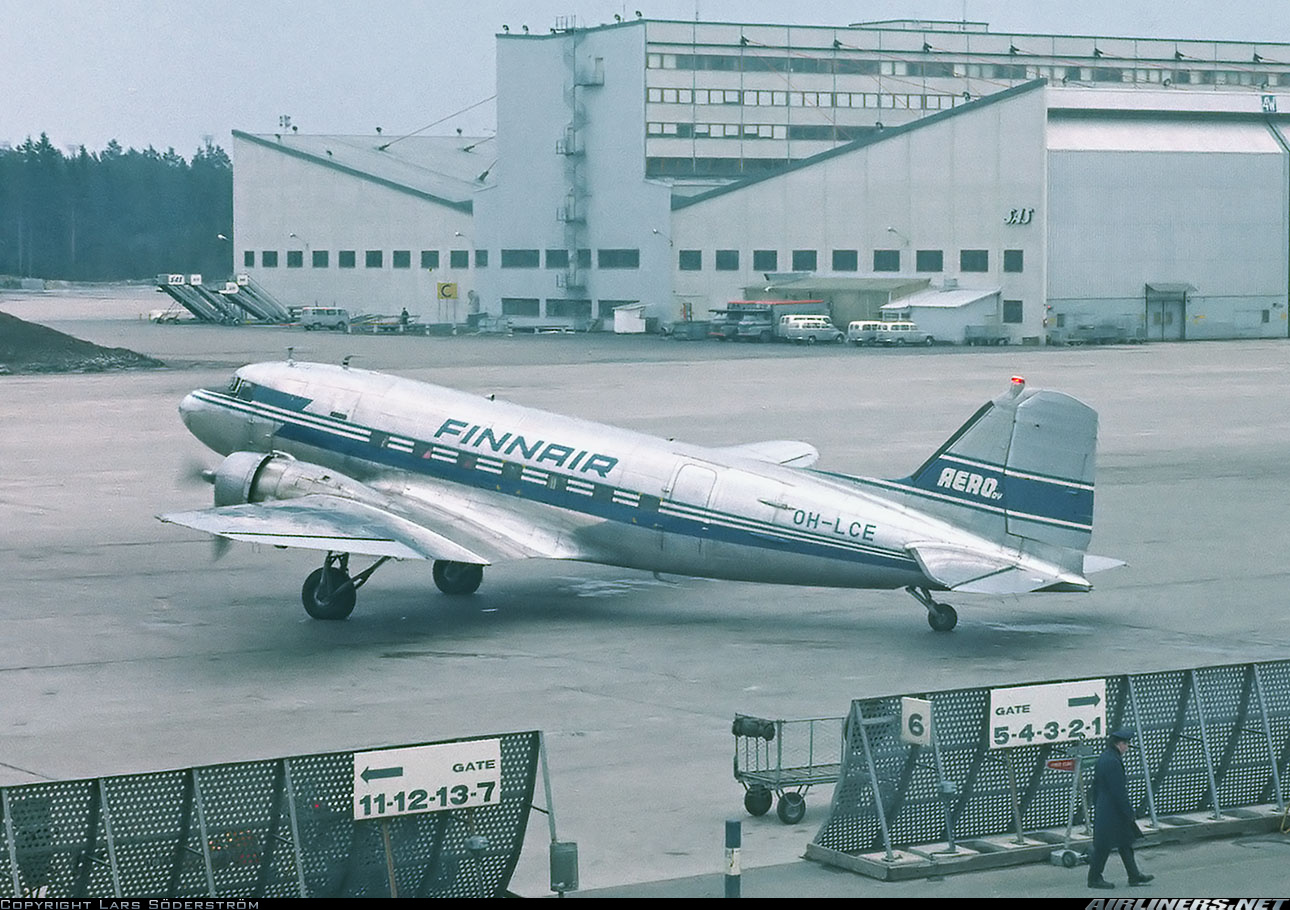
Douglas DC-3 at Stockholm-Arlanda airport in 1966

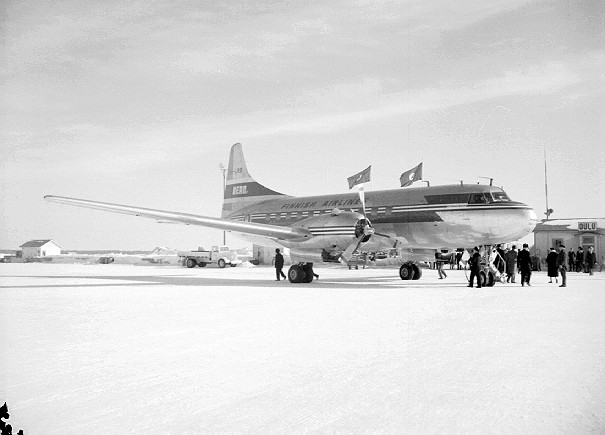
Convair CV-340 at Oulu airport

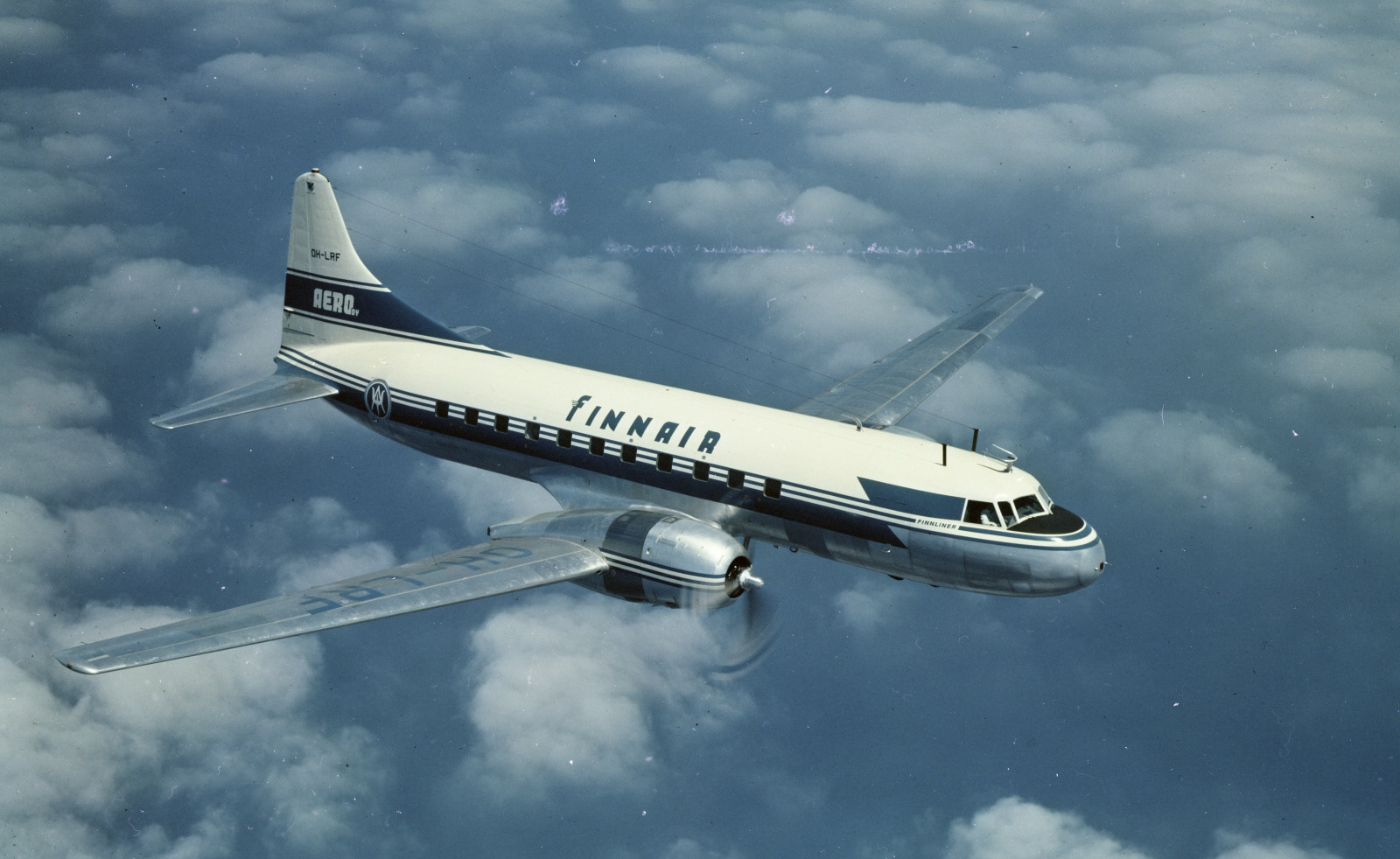
Convair CV-440

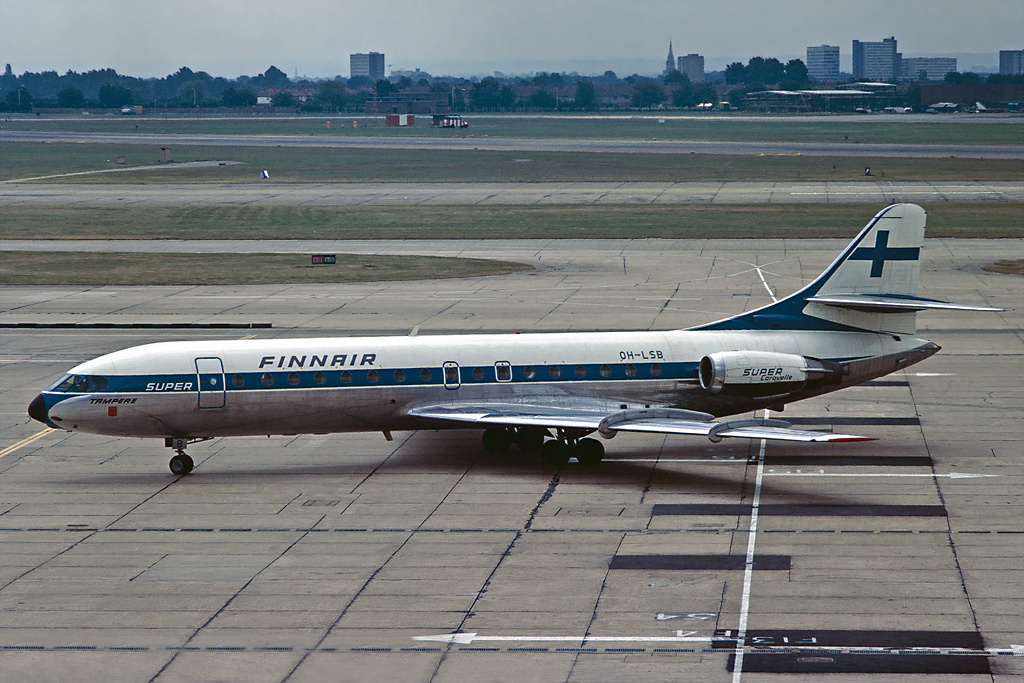
Sud Aviation Caravelle III

=== Finnair gallery ===
In livery chronological order

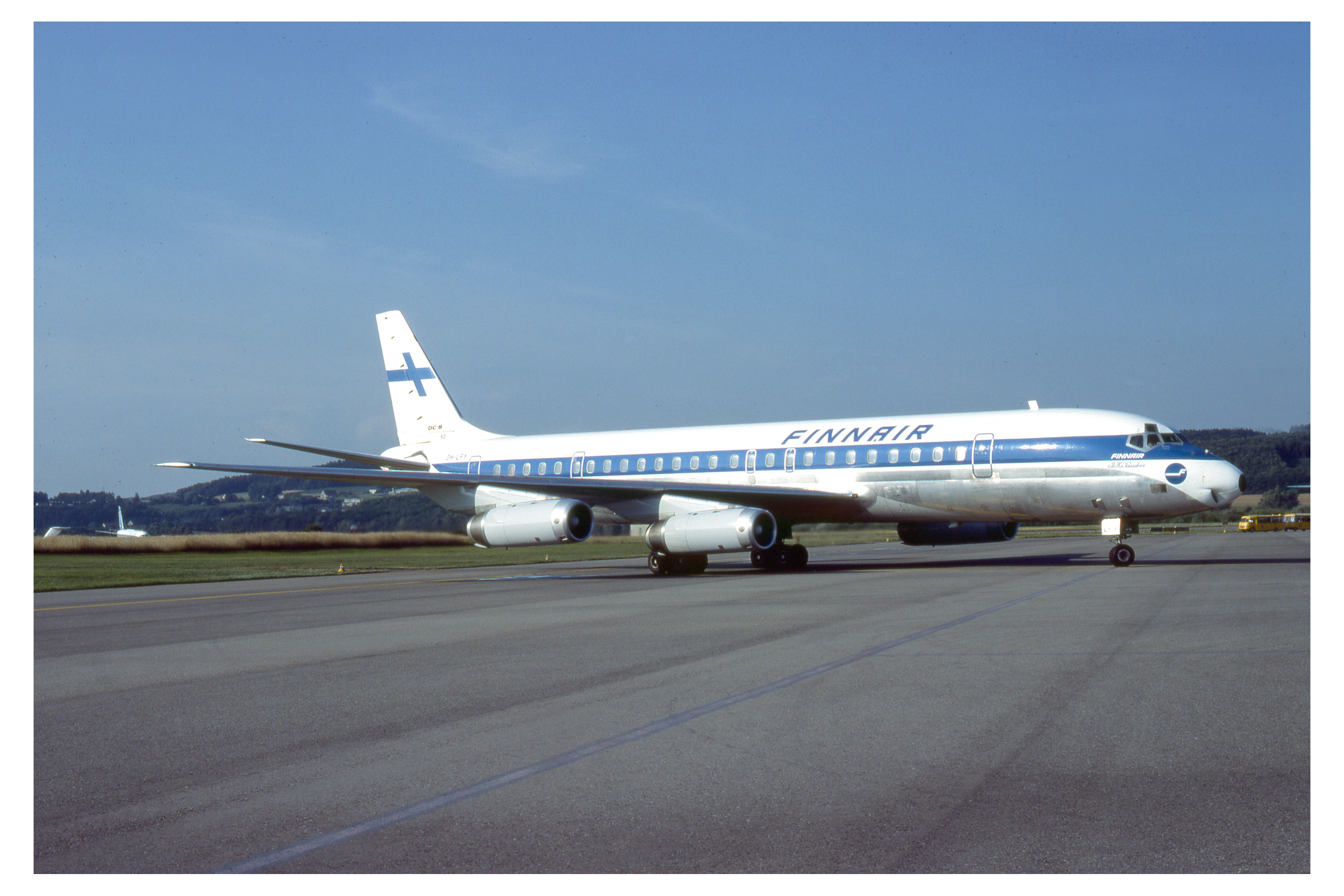
Douglas DC-8-62

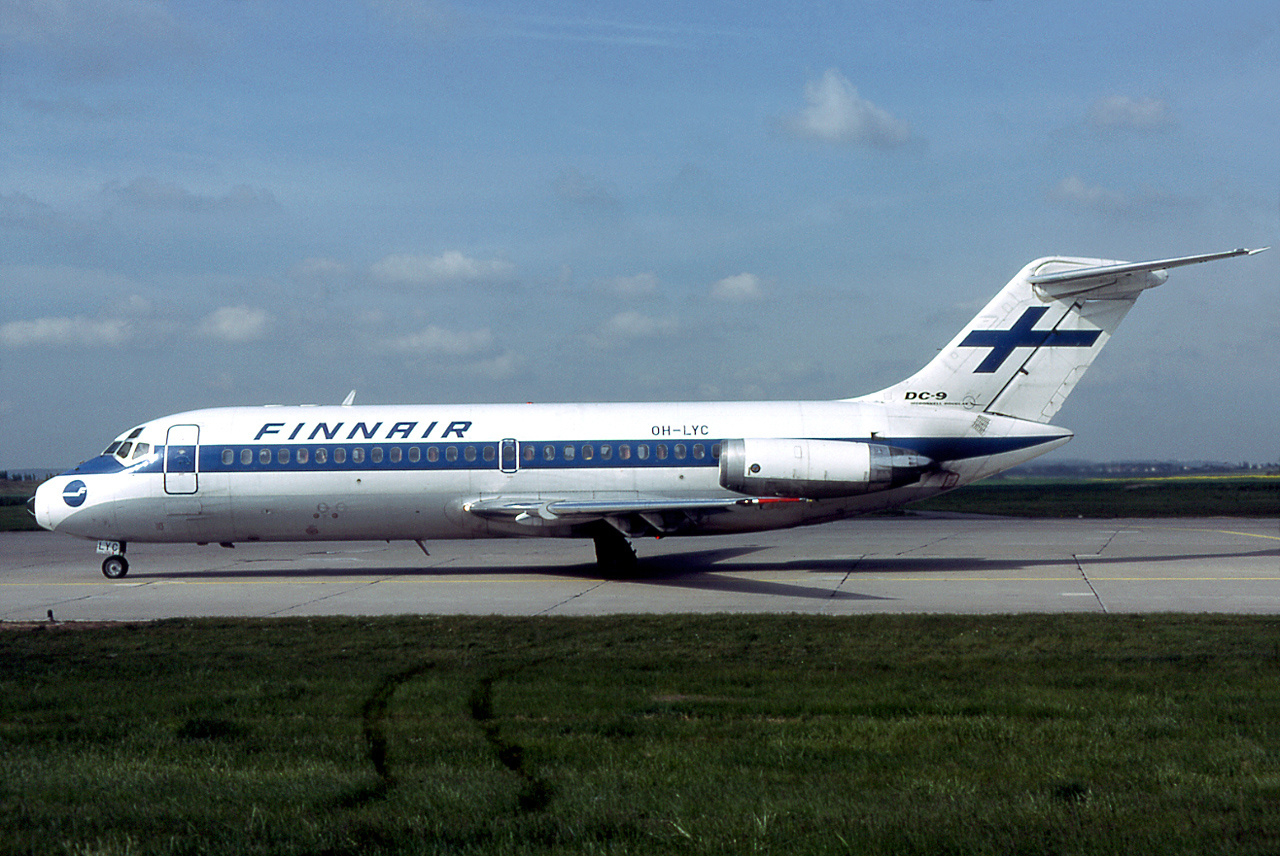
Douglas DC-9-14

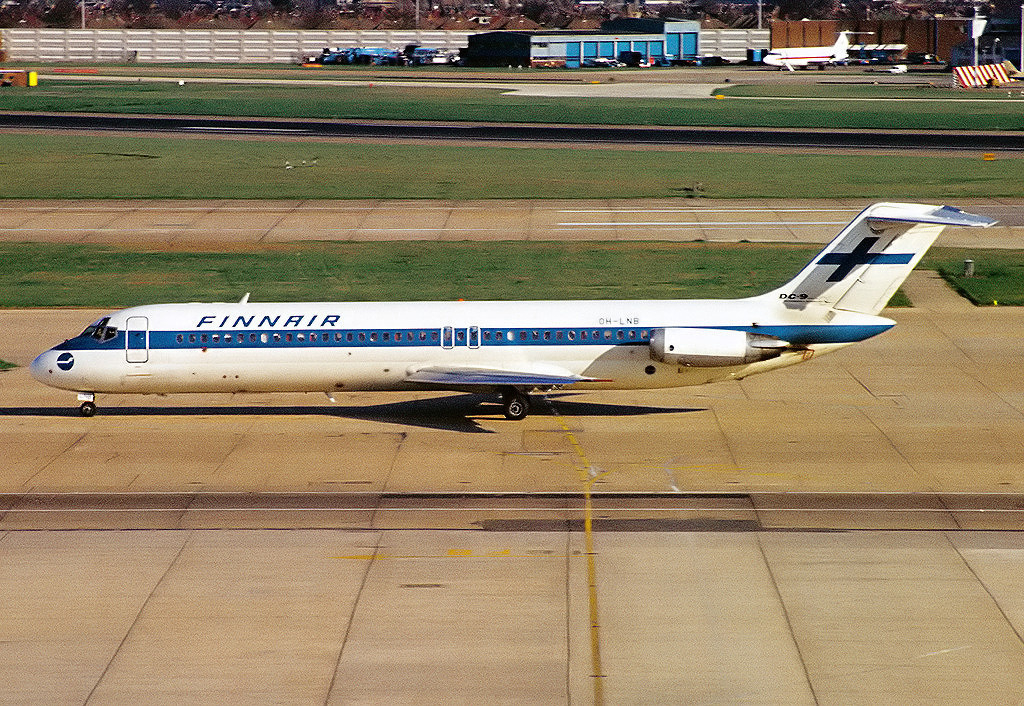
Douglas DC-9-41

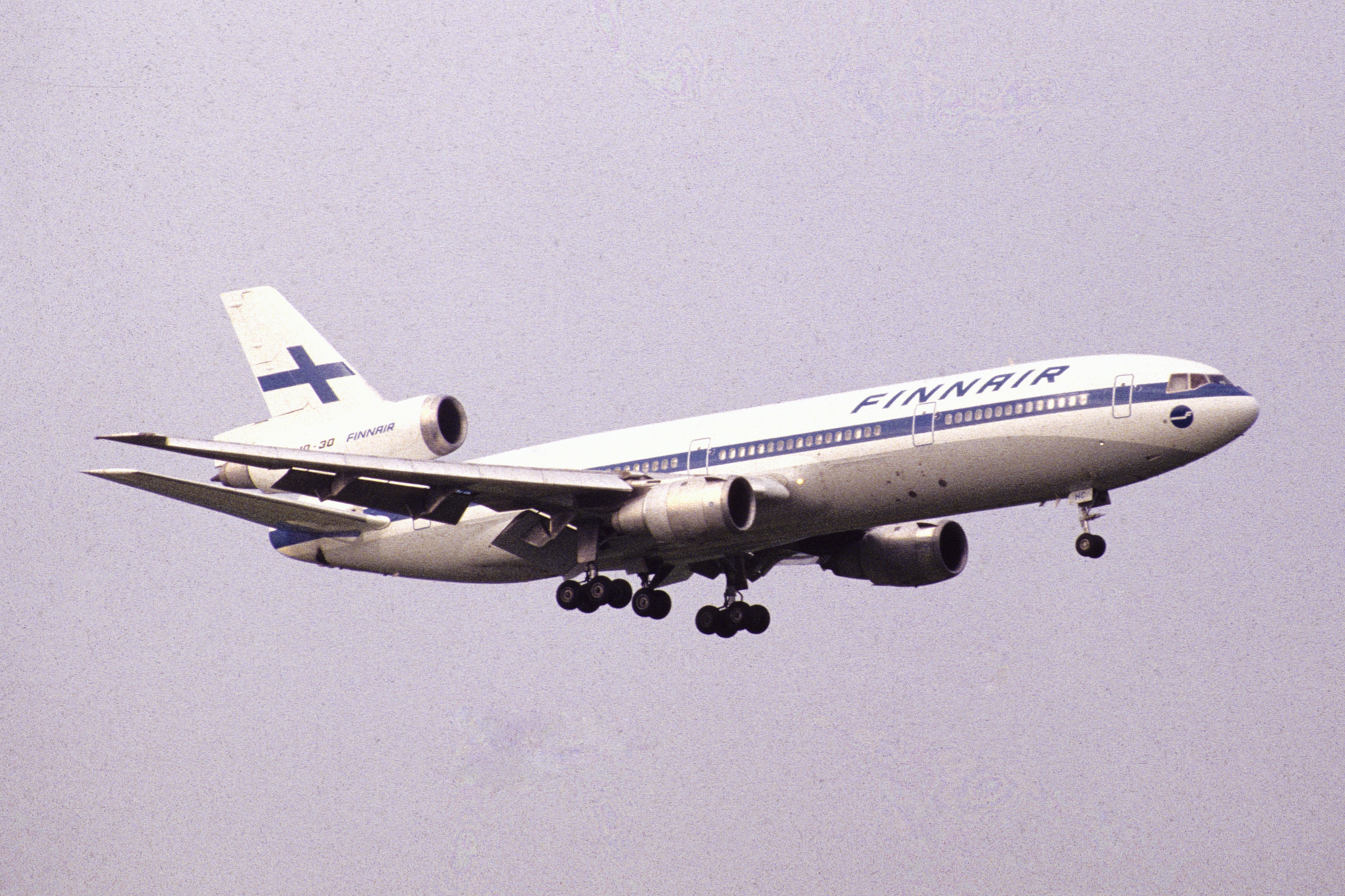
Douglas DC-10-30

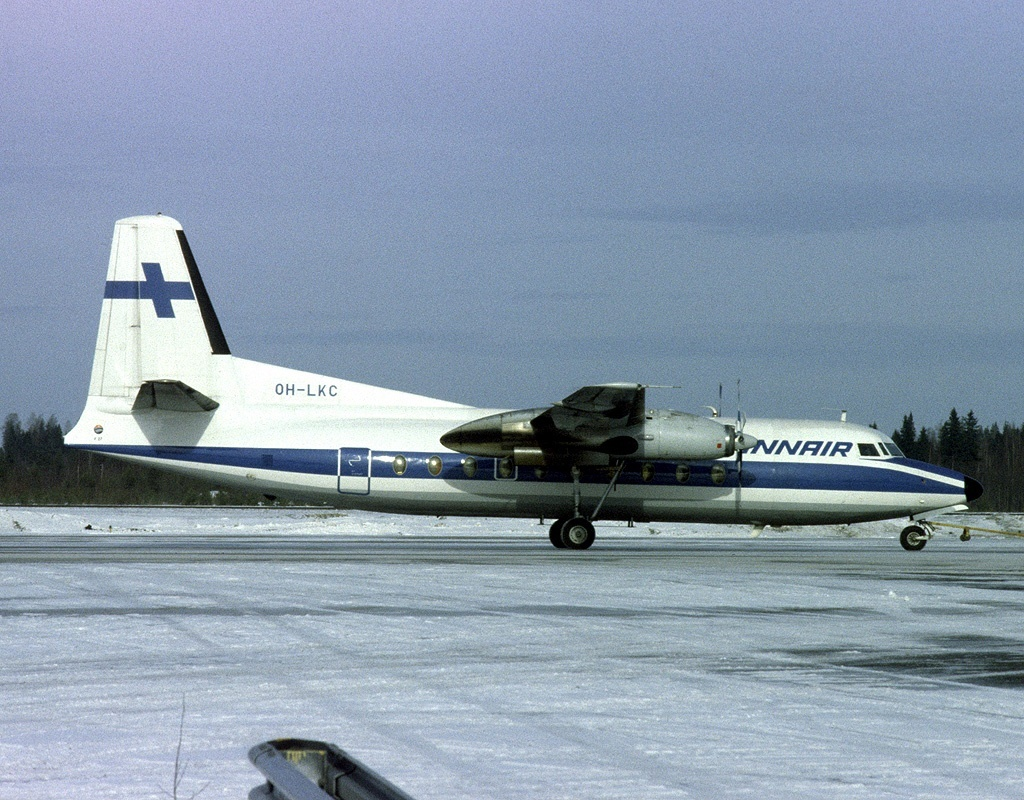
Fokker F.27

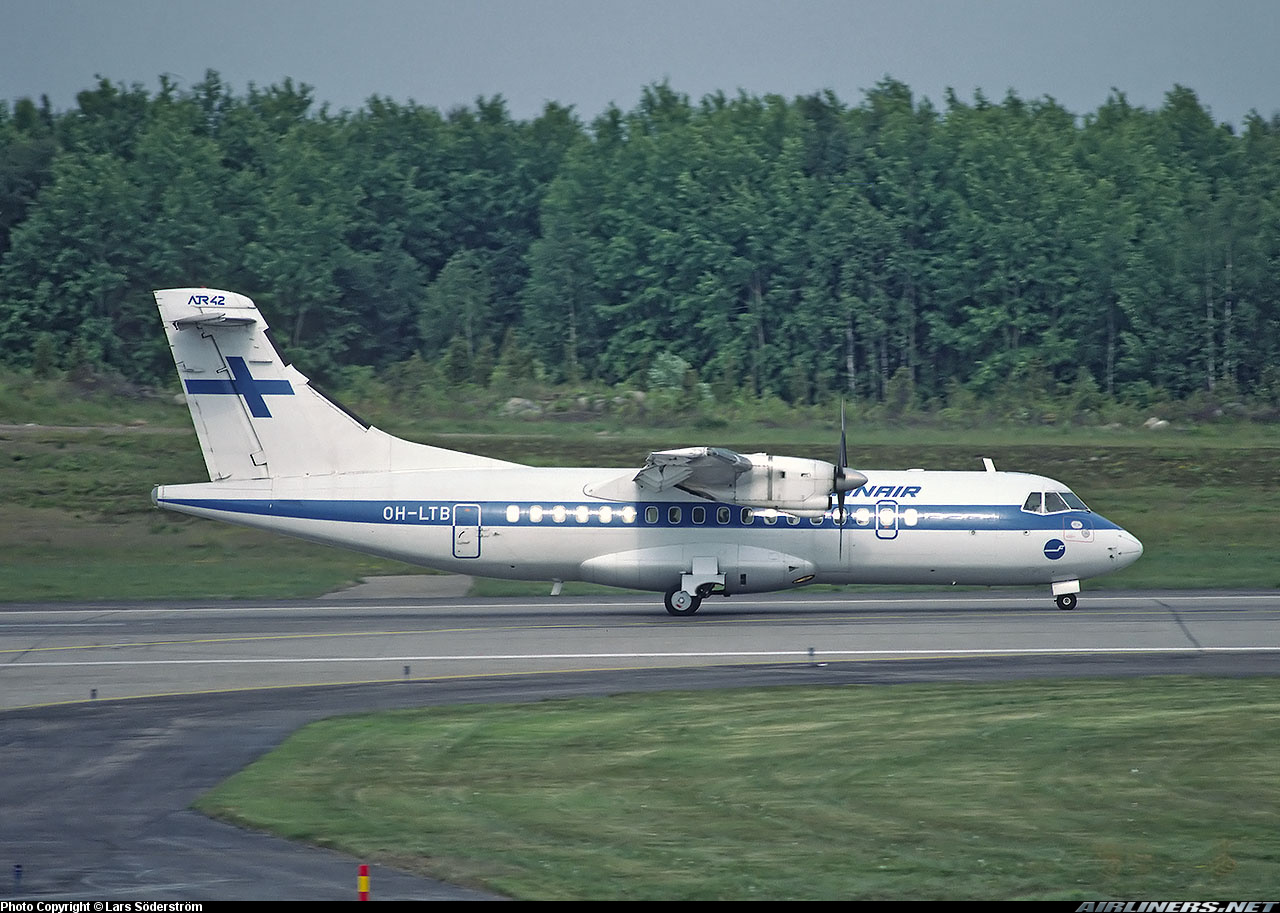
ATR 42

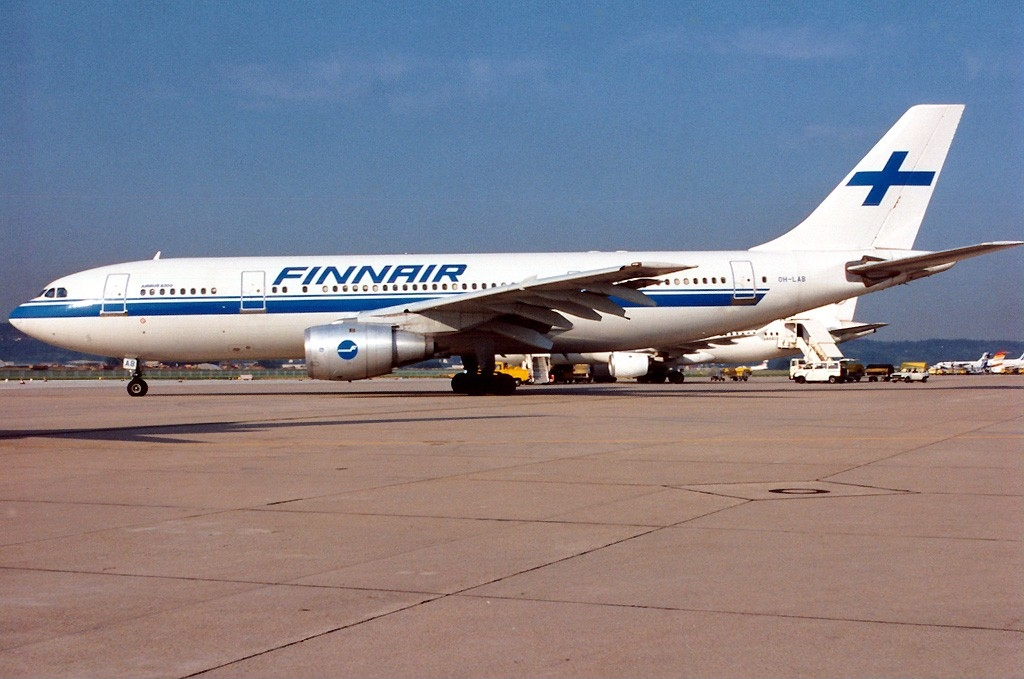
Airbus A300B4

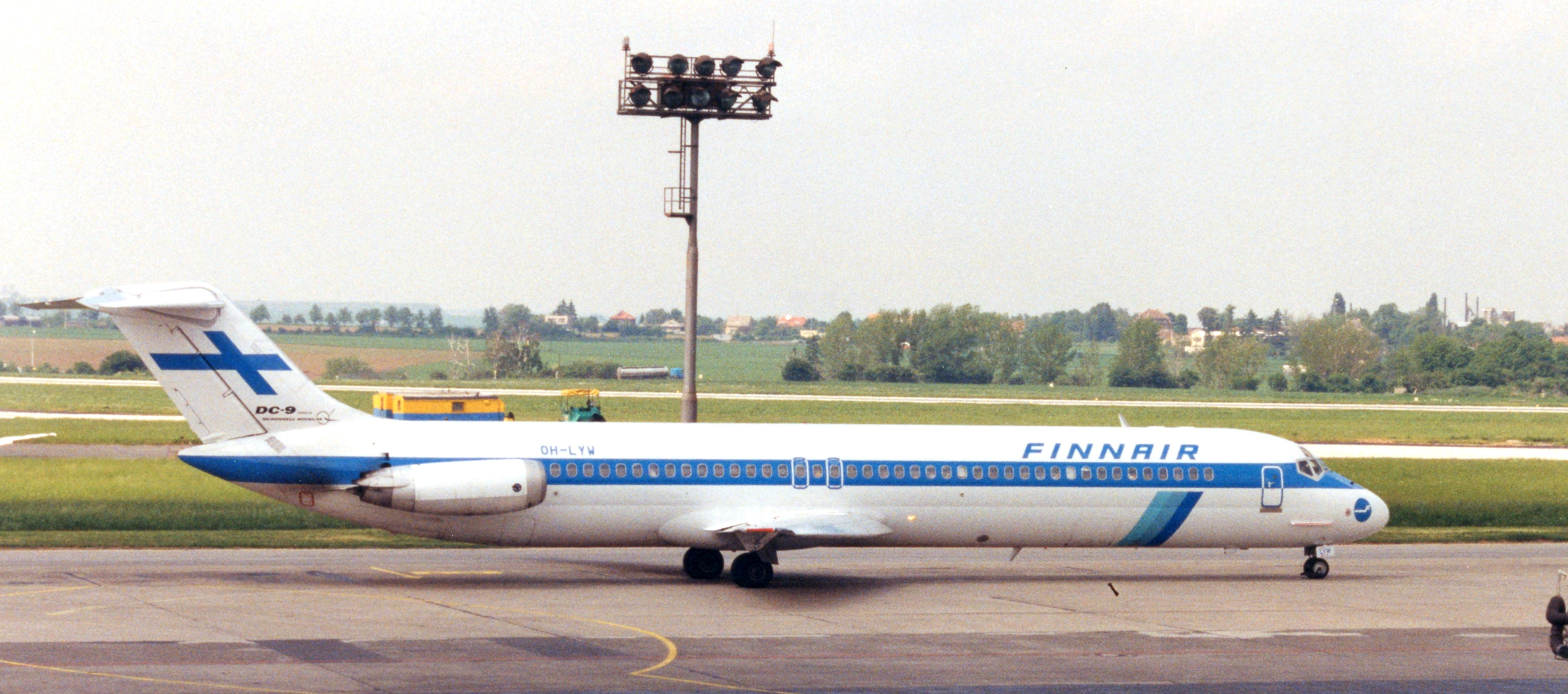
McDonnell Douglas DC-9-51

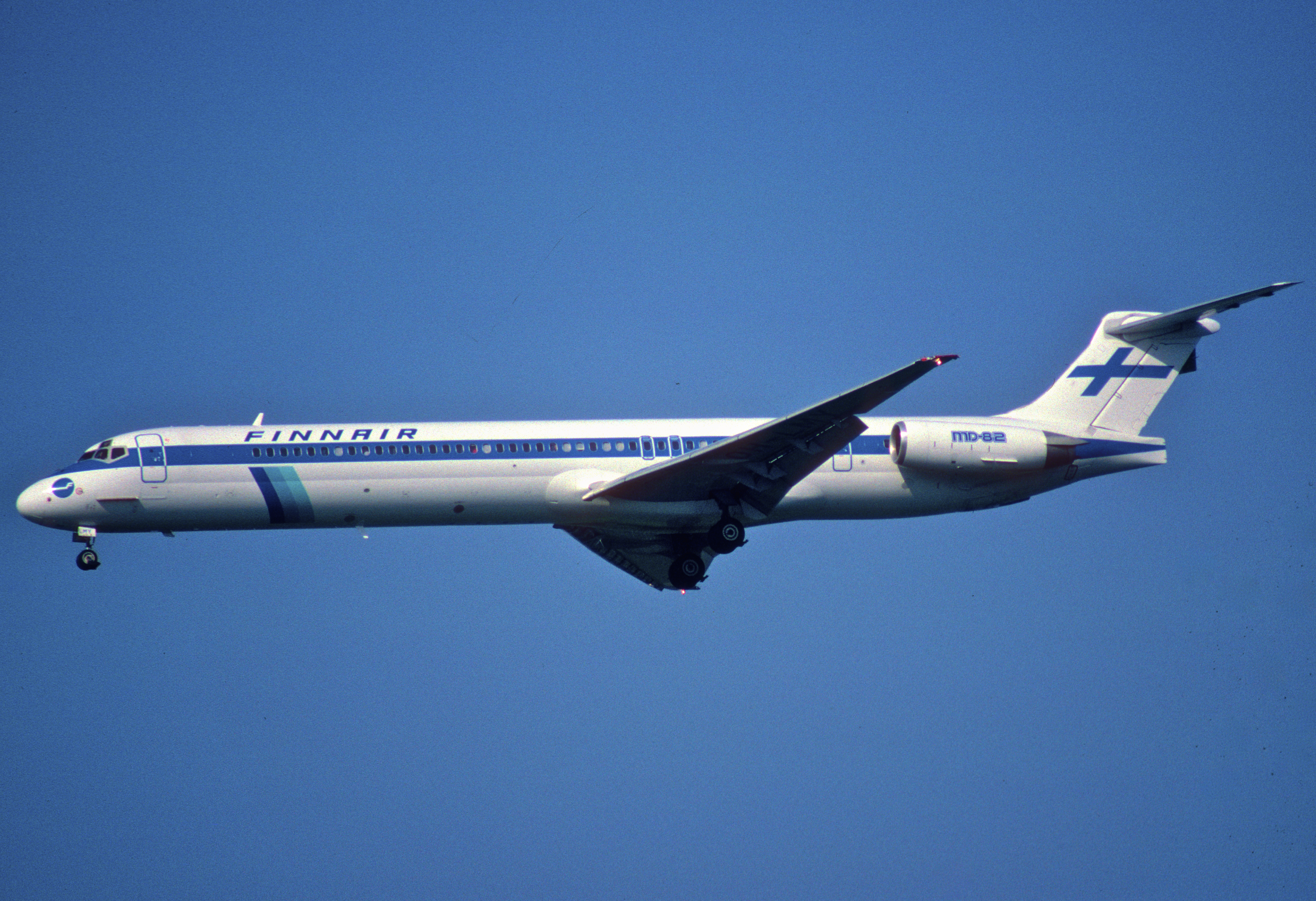
McDonnell Douglas MD-82

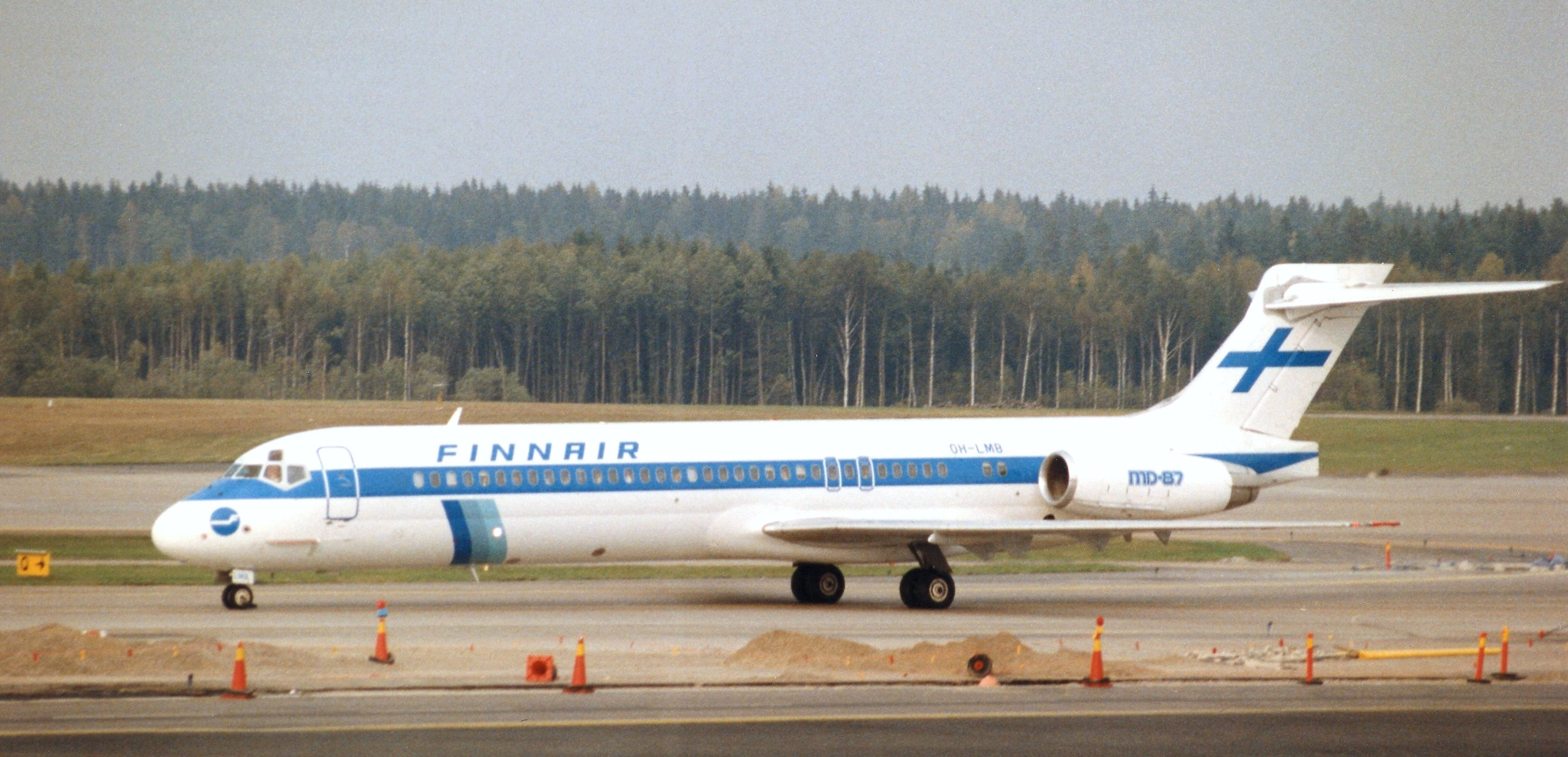
McDonnell Douglas MD-87

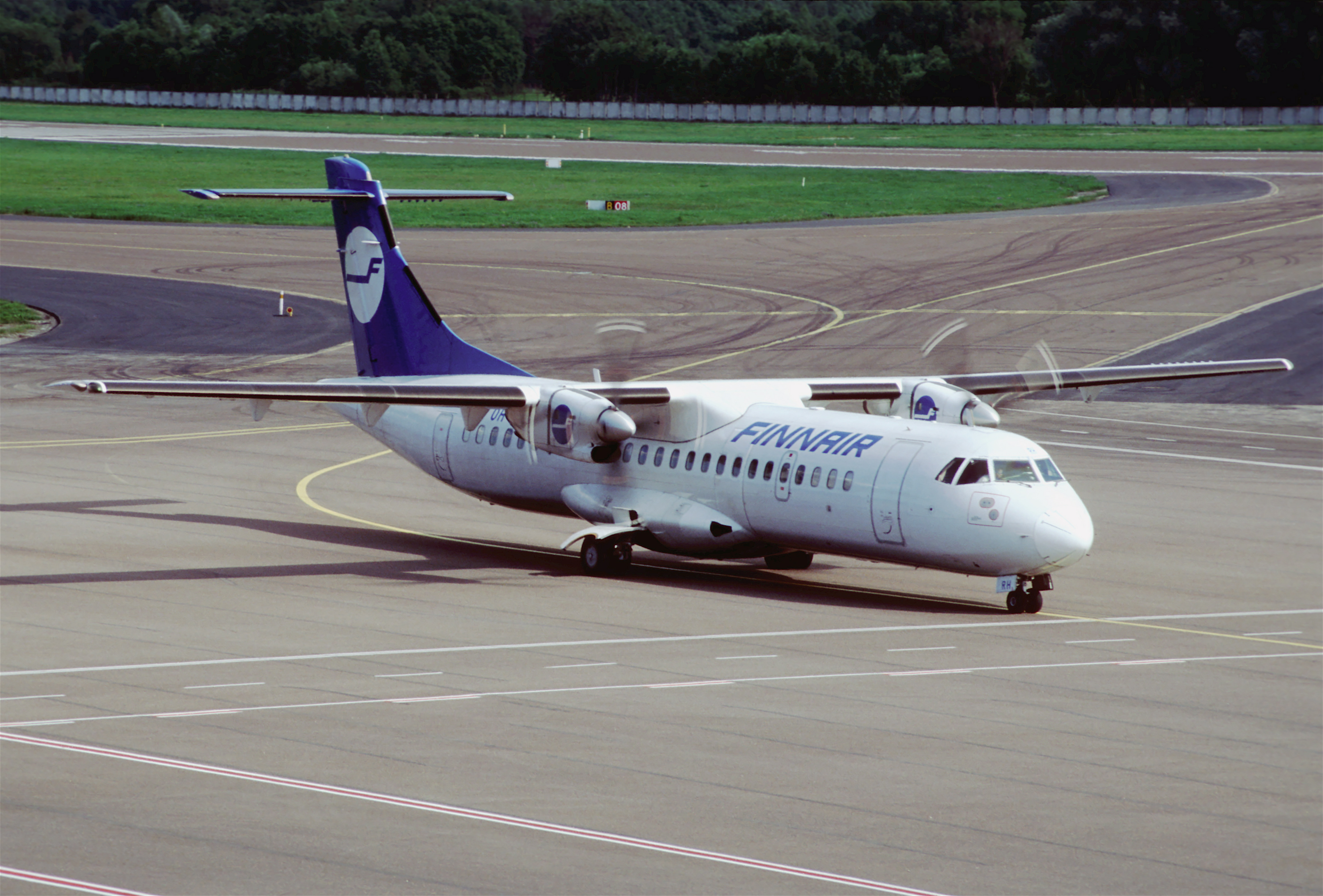
ATR 72

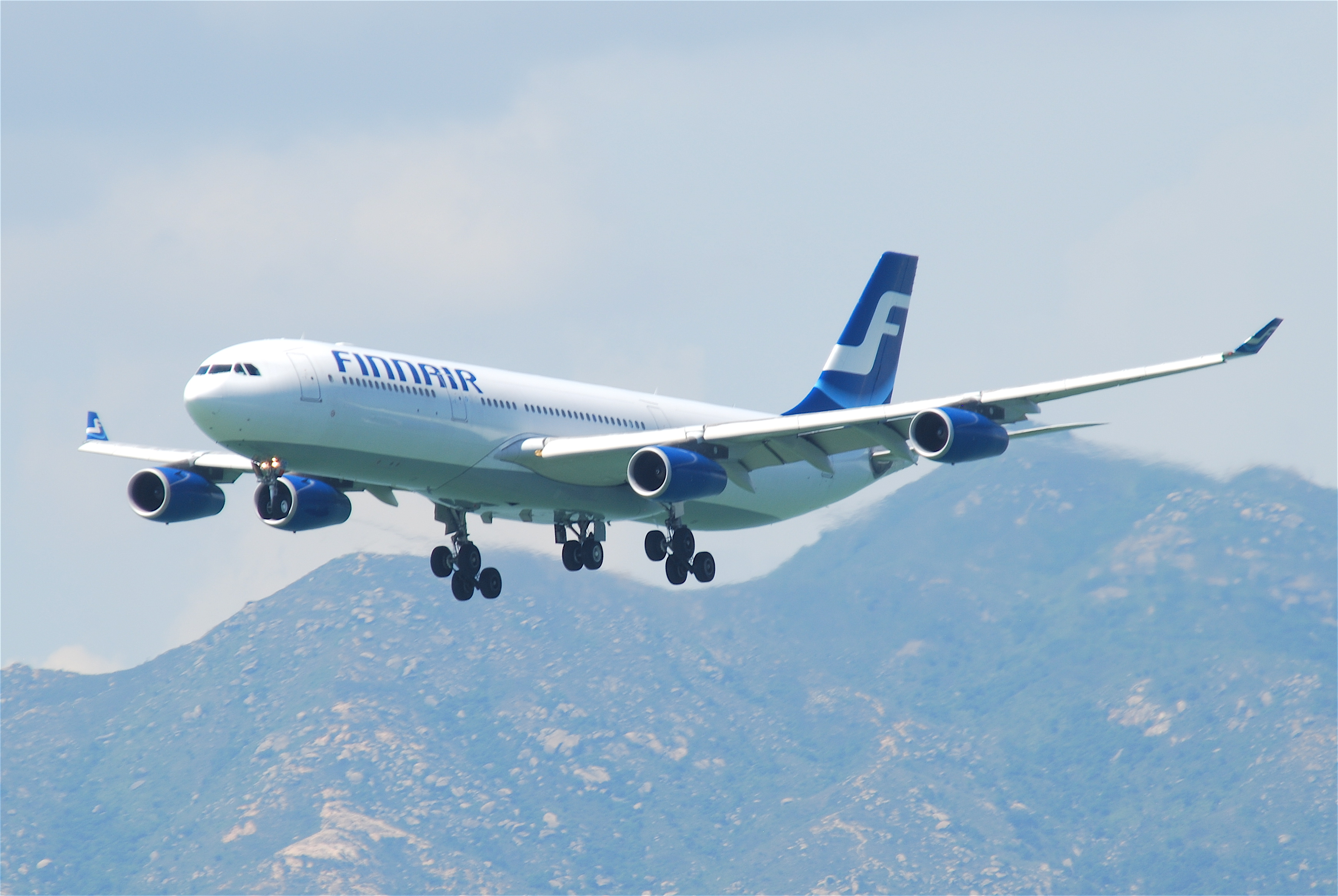
Airbus A340

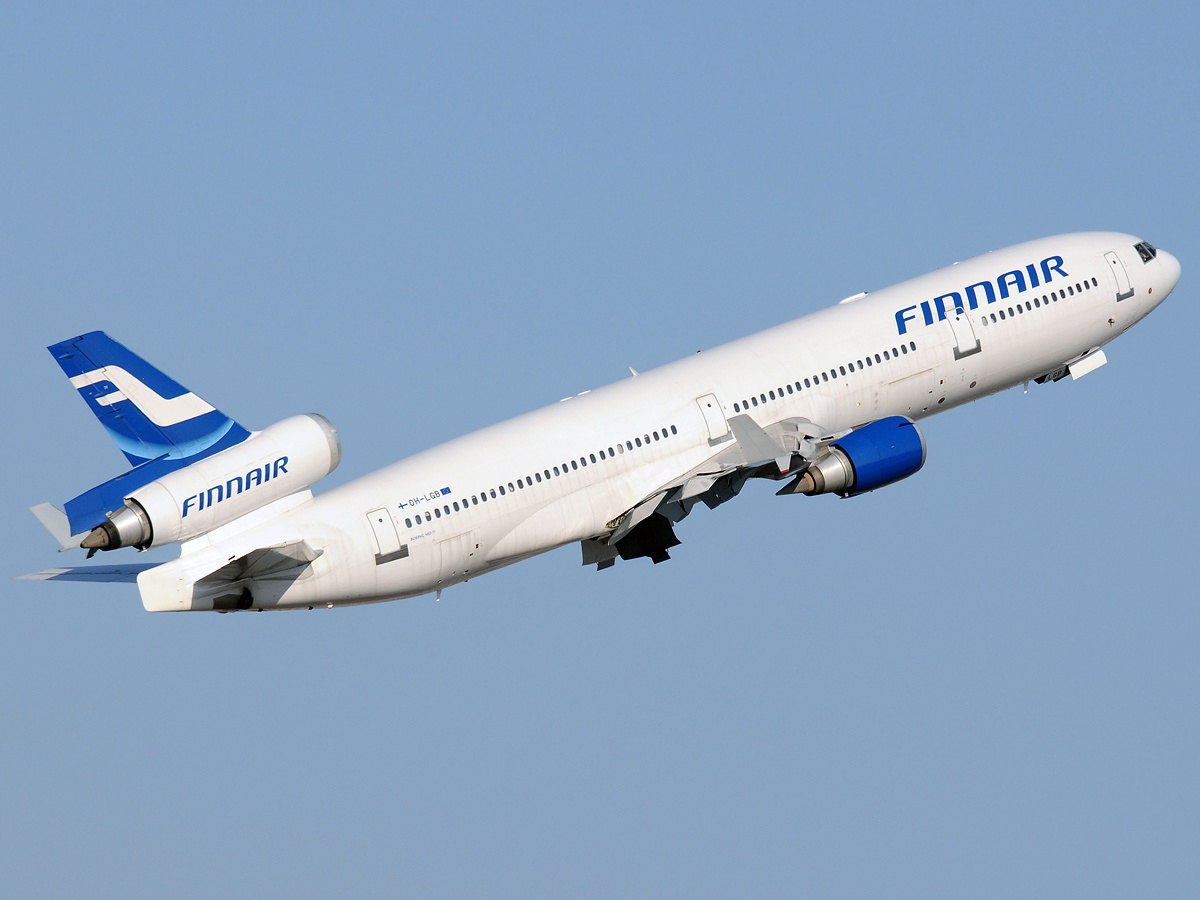
McDonnell Douglas MD-11

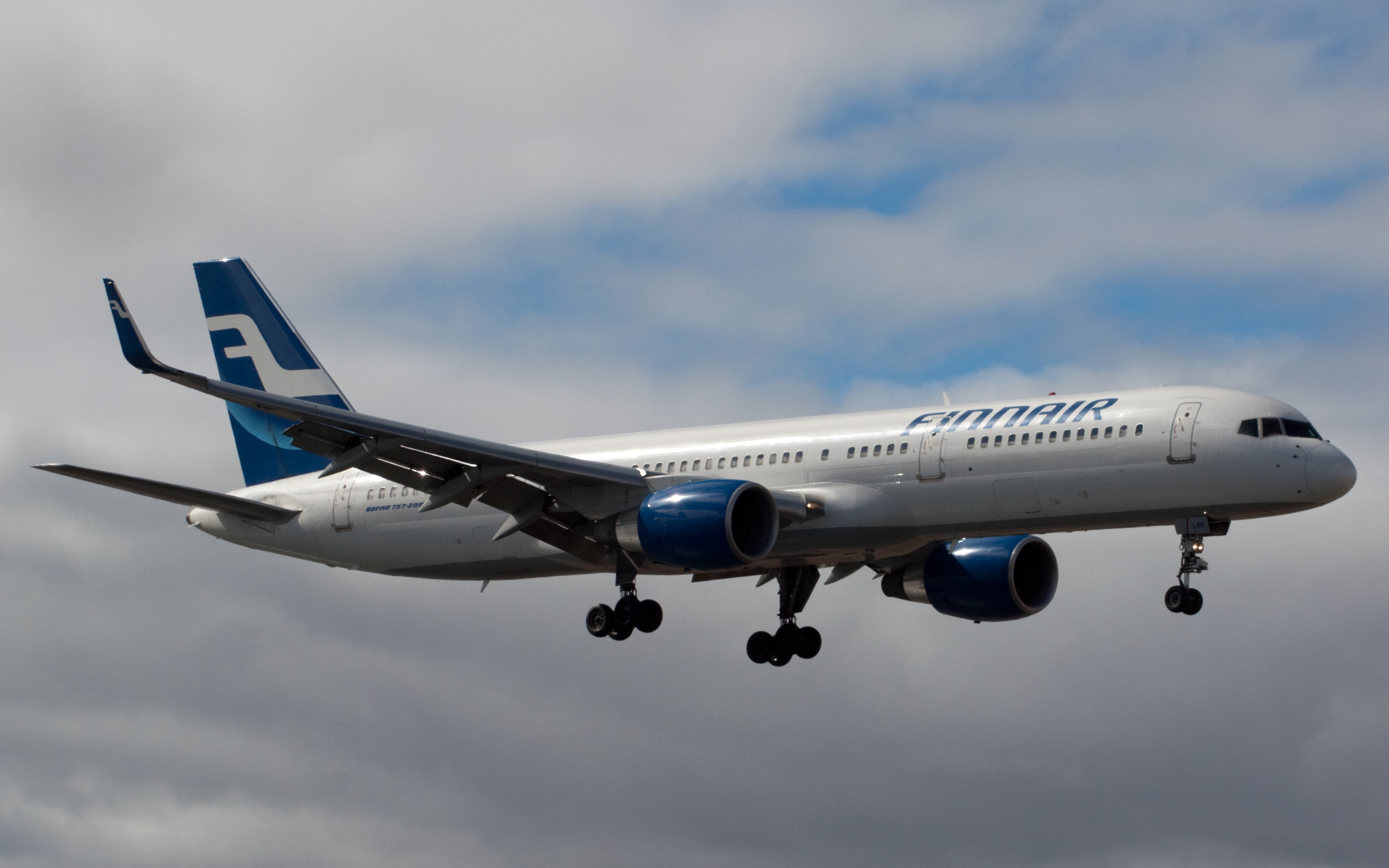
Boeing 757-200

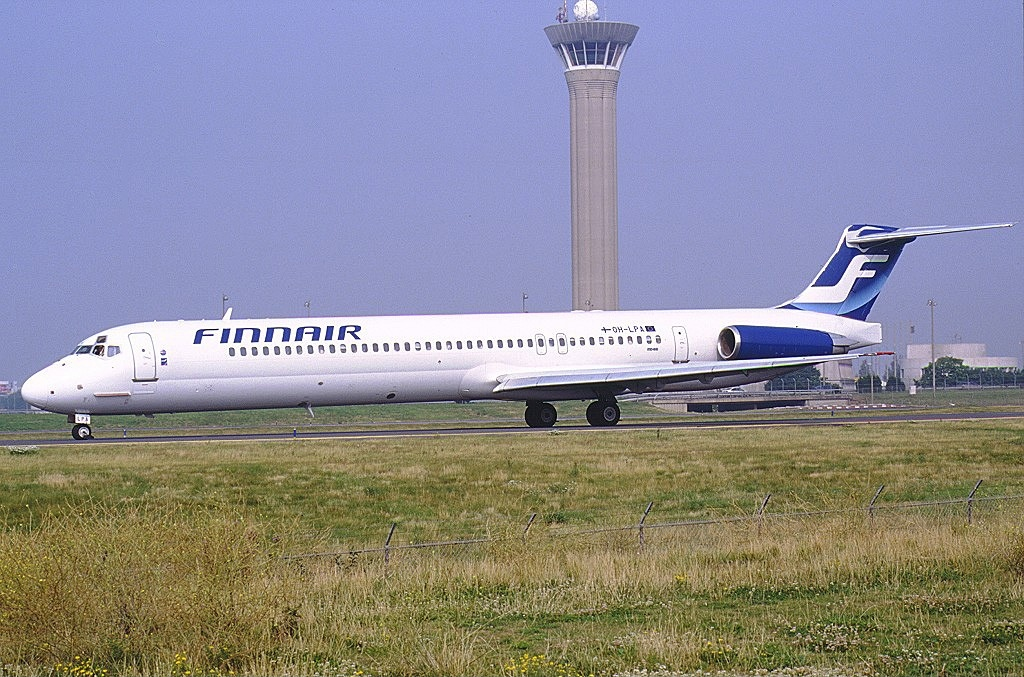
McDonnell Douglas MD-82

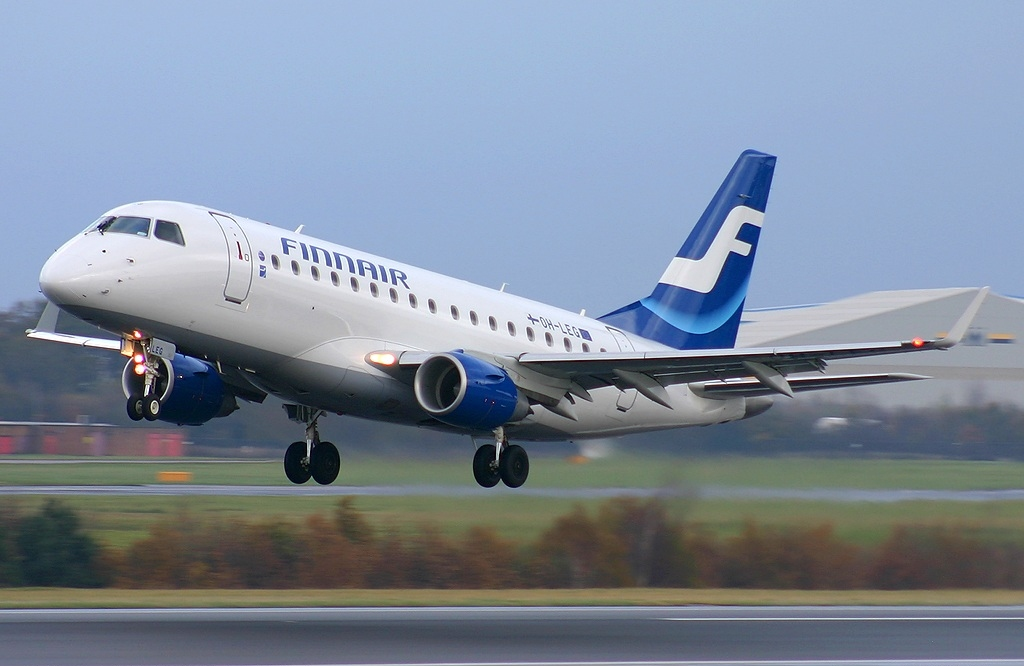
Embraer 170

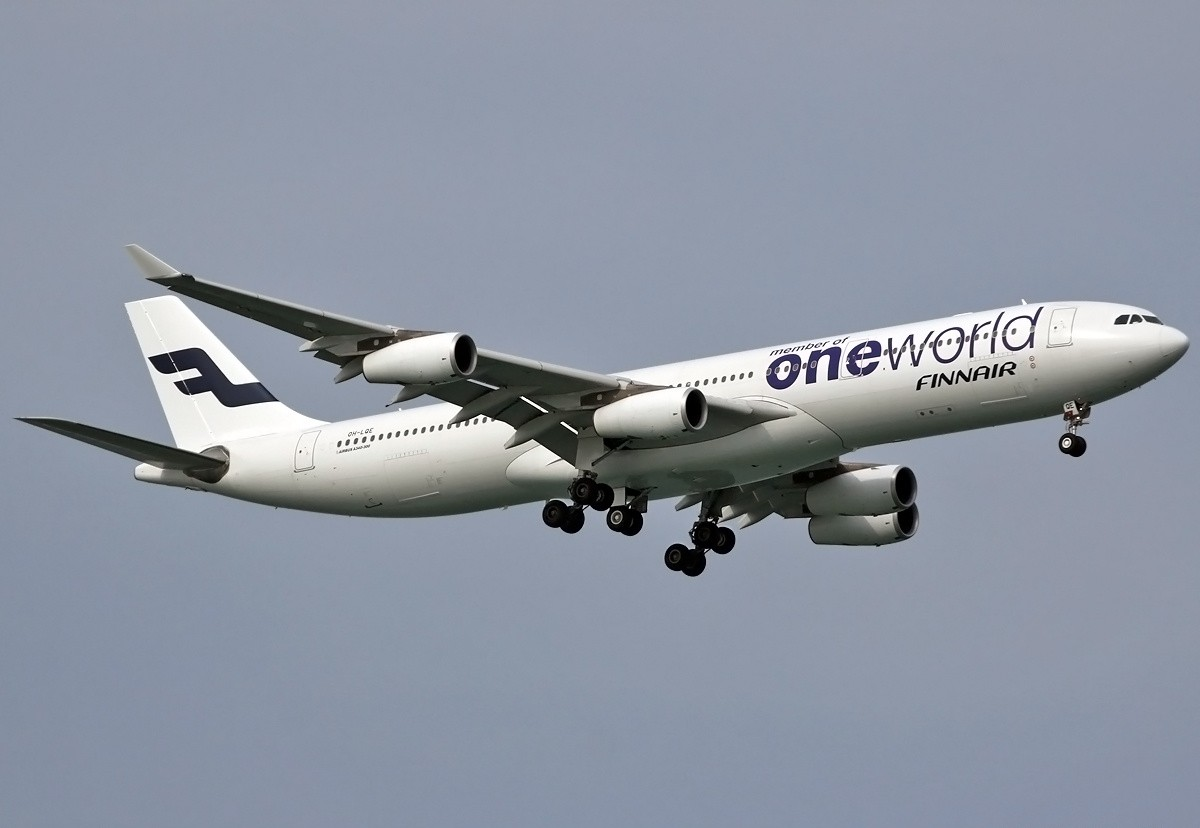
Airbus A340-300 in Oneworld livery

=== Finnaviation subsidiary historic fleet ===
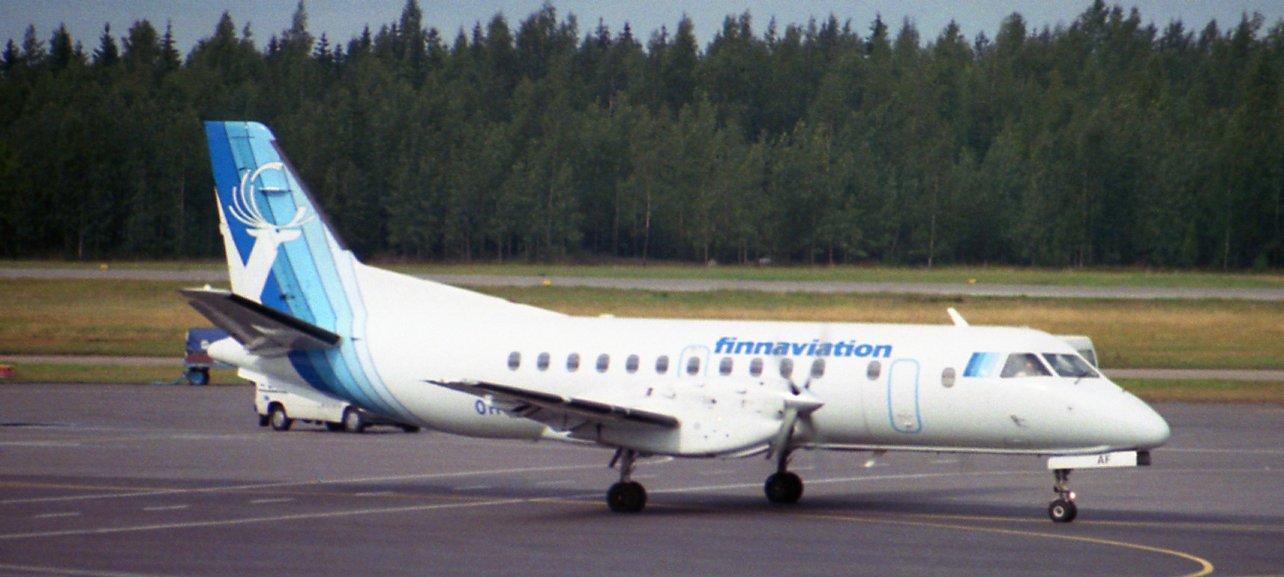
Saab 340B

In the early 1980s, the fleet of the Finnaviation subsidiary consisted of: an Aero Commander 690, a Beech 95-A55 Baron, Cessna F150J (2), a Cessna 401B, a Cessna F172M, a Cessna 401A, Cessna 404 Titan (2), a Cessna 441 Conquest, a Cessna 402B, a Cessna 425 Corsair, a Cessna F172P, Cessna F152 (2), Embraer EMB 110 Bandeirante (3), a Dassault Falcon 200, a Piper PA-28-140 Cherokee, a Piper PA-32-300 Cherokee Six and a Cessna T188C Husky.

== Cabins ==
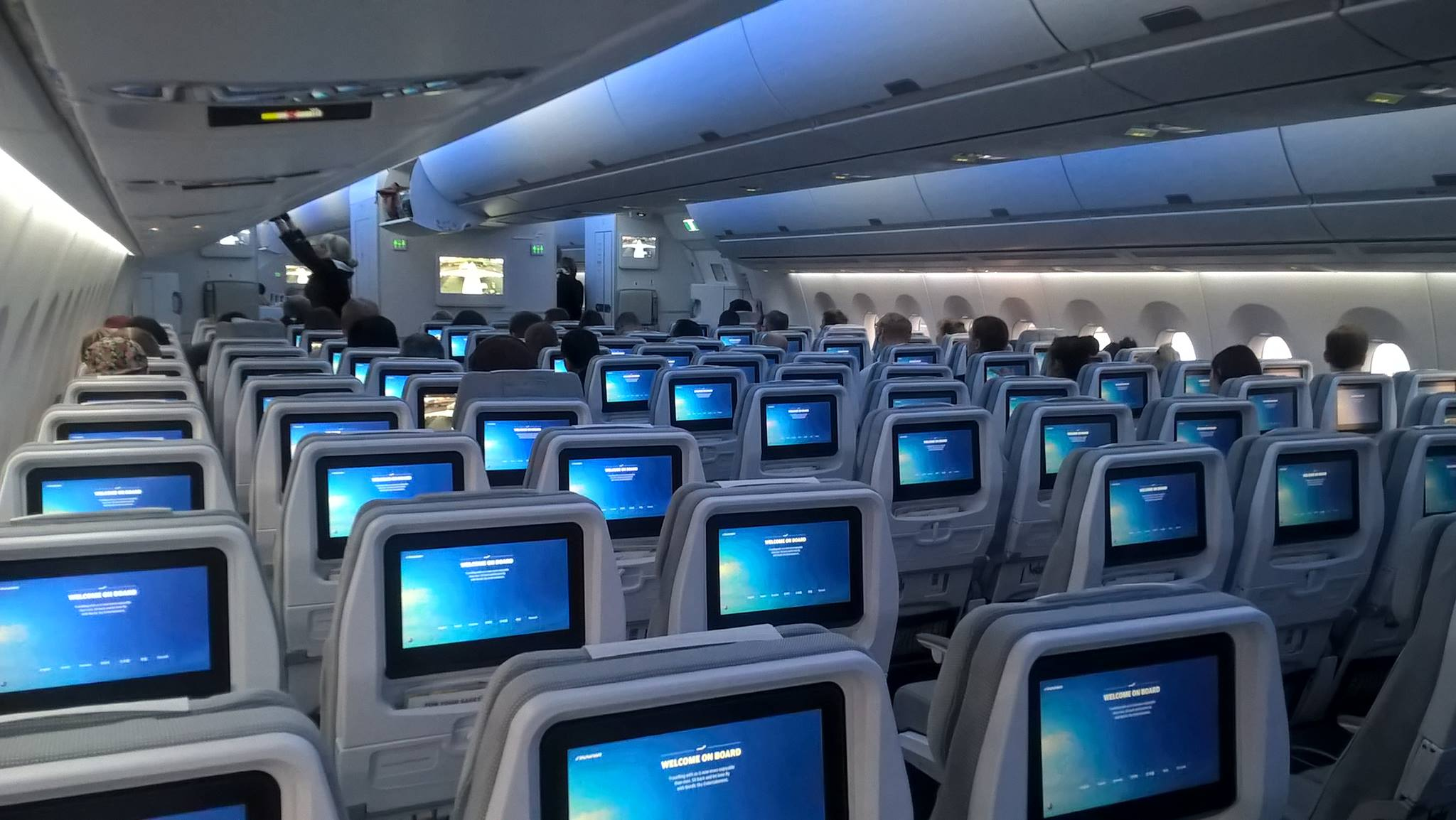
Economy class cabin in an Airbus A350-900

=== Business class ===
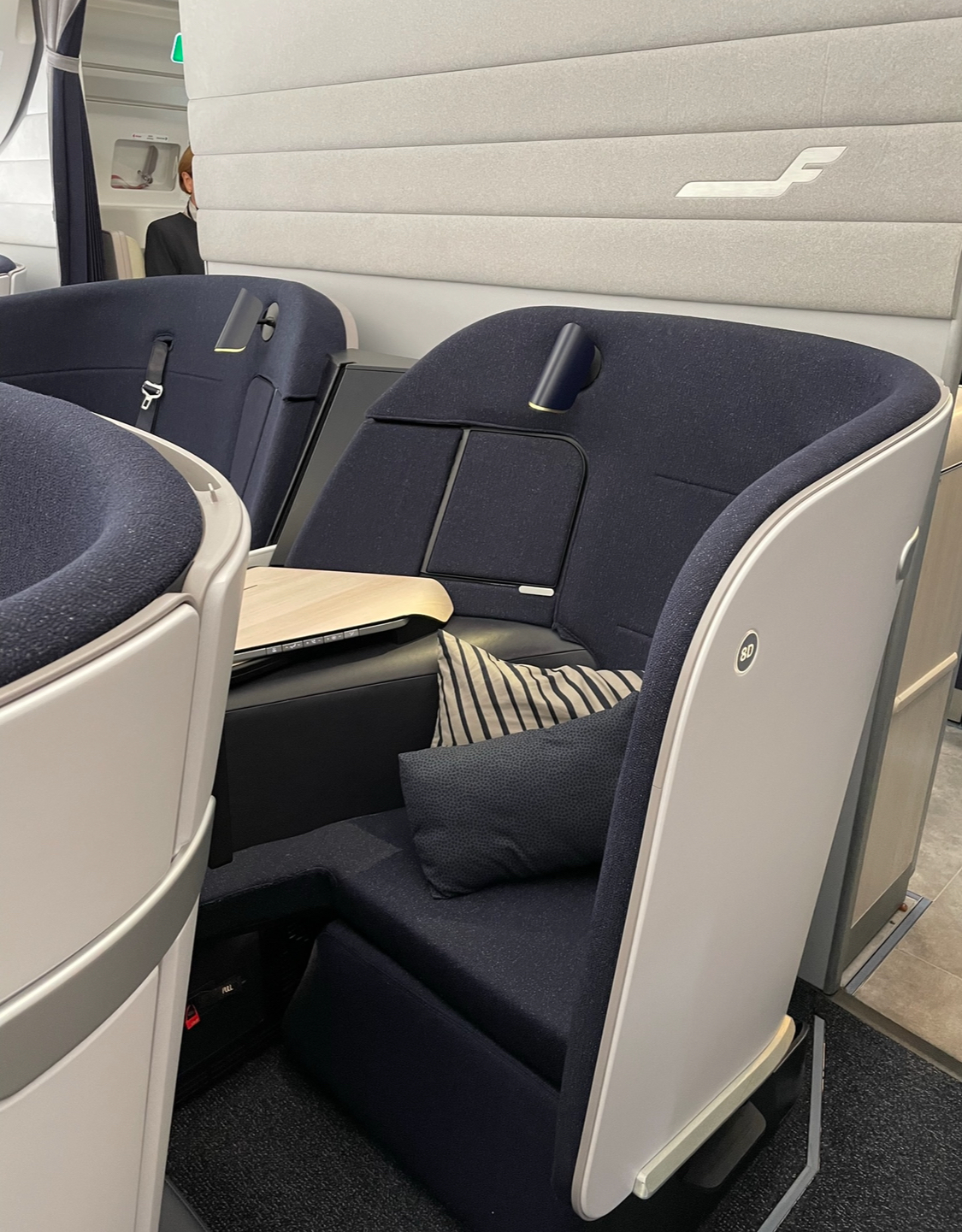
New business class seating in an Airbus A350-900

Business class is offered on the entire Airbus fleet. On long-haul aircraft, the seats are equipped with personal in-flight entertainment. Zodiac Cirrus III seats are fitted in business class on all wide-body aircraft. Each seat has direct aisle access and reclines to a 78-inch full flat bed. In February 2022, Finnair unveiled new long-haul business class seats, alongside the debut of a premium economy cabin. The seats are based on the Collins Aerospace's Aerospace AirLounge. The seats are enclosed in a shell with no recline capabilities. According to the airline, this allows passengers to choose a wide variety of sitting and sleeping positions.

=== Premium Economy class ===
Premium economy, Finnair's newest class of service, was introduced in February 2022. It is currently rolled out on the Airbus A330s and A350s. The seats are based on the Vector Premium by HAECO.

=== In-flight magazine ===
Finnair's English-language in-flight magazine, Blue Wings, was published 10 times a year. The first edition of Blue Wings magazine was published in 1980. It was discontinued in 2020 and is now available online in Finnish and English. Domestic and international newspapers are available online on Finnair Nordic Sky portal during flights. As of 2023, Blue Wings has been reintroduced in physical form for Finnair's centenary year and the years to come.

== Environmental efforts ==
In December 2018, Finnair flights out of SFO began being supplied with sustainable aviation fuel as part of a project involving SFO, Shell, and SkyNRG.

== Incidents and accidents ==
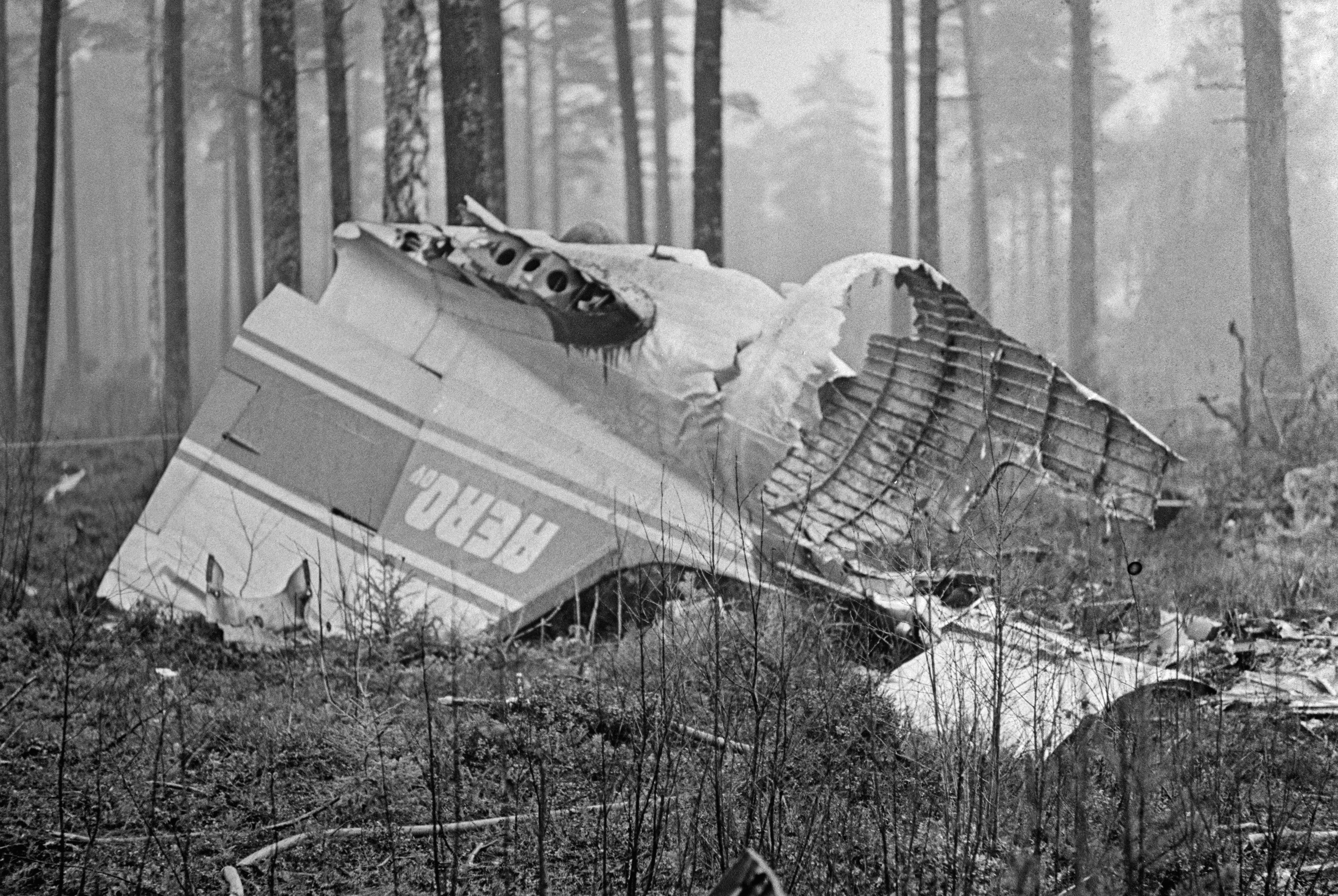
Parts of DC-3 which plunged into the forest in Mariehamn (Åland Islands) on 8 November 1963

- On 28 May 1927, Junkers F.13 K-SALA crashed into Tallinn harbor inbound from Helsinki; all five on board survived, but the aircraft was written off.
- On 16 November 1927, Junkers F.13 K-SALD disappeared en route from Tallinn to Helsinki. The pilot and his two passengers were never found.
- On 10 July 1928, Junkers F.13 K-SALB crashed in the Gulf of Finland; all six on board survived, but the aircraft was written off.
- On 9 October 1935, Junkers F.13 OH-ALI crashed in the Gulf of Finland in fog, killing all six on board.
- On 10 November 1937, a Junkers Ju 52 en route from Turku to Stockholm suffered the detachment of the nose-engine whilst over the sea. The pilots managed to successfully land the aircraft with no fatalities. A broken propeller blade resulted in a severe imbalance that tore the engine off.
- On 14 June 1940, Ju 52/3mge OH-ALL Kaleva, operating as Flight 1631, was shot down by the Soviet Air Force over the Gulf of Finland, apparently as a prelude to the Occupation of Estonia. All nine people on board died.
- On 7 November 1941, Ju 52/3mce OH-LAK Sampo made an emergency landing in the Gulf of Finland off Turku after all three engines quit due to fuel impurity. Although the aircraft was recovered and returned to service, the two occupants of the aircraft drowned while attempting to swim to safety. OH-LAK would be lost after a 1945 accident.
- On 31 October 1945, Ju 52 OH-LAK struck power lines and crashed in a forest while performing a radio-controlled approach to Hyvinkää. Radio signals were distorted by high-tension wires and the aircraft descended too low. All 14 people on board survived, but the aircraft was written off.
- On 3 January 1961, Flight 311 from Kronoby to Vaasa flown by a Douglas DC-3 stalled on final approach and crashed at Kvevlax, killing all 25 people on board. Both pilots were drunk and sleep deprived. This remains Finland's worst aviation accident.
- On 8 November 1963, Flight 217 from Helsinki to Mariehamn via Turku flown by a DC-3 crashed into terrain on final approach to Mariehamn. The sole flight attendant and two passengers were the only survivors of the crash. The cause was believed to have been poor visibility and a malfunctioning altimeter that tricked the pilots into believing they were higher than they really were. 20 passengers and two crew were killed. To date, this is Finnair's last fatal accident.
- On 30 September 1978, Flight 405 from Oulu to Helsinki flown by Sud Aviation Caravelle was hijacked by Aarno Lamminparras armed with a pistol (Finland did not perform security checks on domestic flights), who held the 48 other passengers and crew hostage. The plane continued to Helsinki, where 34 of the 44 passengers were released before returning to Oulu where the hijacker received a large ransom from Finnair. The plane then returned to Helsinki for another ransom from a Finnish newspaper before flying to Amsterdam and then back to Helsinki before returning to Oulu. The hijacker released the last hostages and departed the plane before being arrested on 1 October at his home.
- On 23 December 1987, Flight 915 from Tokyo to Helsinki was allegedly shot at by a missile whilst over Svalbard. The missile allegedly exploded in the air before striking the DC-10. The events were not revealed until 2014.

== Sources ==
- Haapavaara, Heikki (1998). Aika lentää. Finnair 75 [Time flies. Finnair 75 years.] (in Finnish). Finnair. ISBN 951-98041-0-2.
- Spaeth, Andreas (29 May 2023). "Finnair Soars Again After Adapting". Airline Ratings. Archived from the original on 4 June 2023.
