= List of defunct airlines of Finland =

This is a list of defunct airlines of Finland.

Airline	Image	IATA	ICAO	Callsign	Commenced operations	Ceased operations	Notes
A
Aero O/Y					1923	1968	Rebranded Finnair in 1953 and renamed in 1968
Air Åland		N9 2Q	NVD	NORVIND	2005	2012	Previously Flyg & Far Åland Operations transferred to Swedish Nextjet
Air Botnia O/Y		KF	KFB	BOTNIA	1988	2003	Renamed Blue1
Air Carelia					1983	1987	Operated Cessna Citation I
Air Finland		OF	FIF	AIR FINLAND	2003	2012	Went bankrupt
Air Finlandia					1987	1988	Failed project. Operated Airbus A321
Air100					2012	2014	A virtual airline, had never AOC or OL
B
Blue1 O/Y		KF	BLF	BLUEFINN	1987	2016	Previously Air Botnia Assets merged into CityJet from Ireland
C
Copterline & Copter Action			AAQ	COPTERLINE	1990	2016	
D
Deltacraft		4L	DEC	DELTACRAFT	2001	2004	
E
Euro-Flite					1970	1998	Established as KoneAir. Merged with Jetflite. Operated Falcon 20
F
Finlantic					1961	1963	Went bankrupt
Finnaviation		FA	FAV	BLUEBIRD	1979	1996	Merged into Finnair of which was a subsidiary
Finnish Commuter Airlines branded Finncomm Airlines		FC	WBA/FCM	WESTBIRD/FINNCOMM	1995	2015	Renamed Nordic Regional Airlines/Flybe Finland
Finnwings-Wihuri O/Y Finnwings					1970	1979	Previously as Lentohuolto Oy. Merged with Oy Nordair to form Finnaviation.
FirstClass					2012	2013	Established as Line Support. Operated AW139
Fly Lappeenranta		8H	HWY	HIGHWAY	2008	2010	
Flybe Finland		FC	FCM	FINNCOMM	2011	2015	Finnish Commuter Airlines/Finncomm Airlines trading name
Flyg & Far Åland					2005	2005	Renamed Air Åland
Flying Finn			FFW	FLYINGFINN	2002	2004	
G
Go! Aviation					2016	2017	Operated Pilatus PC-12 NG
H
Helikopteripalvelu					1960	1999	Bought by Copterline. Operated Agusta-Bell 206, Bell 206 Long Ranger
Holiday Magic Finland					1973	1975	Operated leased Convair 880
J
Jetflite					1980	2013	
K
Karair		KR	KAR		1957	1996	Previously Karhumäki Airways Merged into Finnair of which was a subsidiary
Karhumäki Airways					1951	1957	Renamed Karair
Kunnallistekniikka					1965	1966	Aerial survey carrier. Operated Pilatus Porter
L
Lentohuolto Oy					1951	1969	Renamed Finnwings-Wihuri O/Y Finnwings Operated Cessna 150, Cessna 172, Cessna 180, Cessna 185, Cessna 190
Line Support					2011	2012	Renamed FirstClas Operated AW139
N
Nordair OY					1973	1979	Merged with Finnwings to form Finnaviation Operated Falcon 20
Nordic Global Airlines		NJ	NGB	NORDIC GLOBAL	2011	2015	
P
Polar-Air					1961	1970	Finnair charter subsidiary Operated leased Sud Aviation Caravelle
Polarwing		WO			1981	1992	Operated Piper Chieftain
S
Sir-Air					1967	1982	Operated BN-2 Islander, Mitsubishi MU-2, Lockheed Lodestar, Piper Aztec, Piper Navajo
Skargardsflyg		5Q	LND		1956	2002	Operated BN-2 Islander, Cessna Skywagon, Embraer Bandeirante]
Snowbird Airlines			SBW	SNOWMAN	2014	2014	Operated leased Airbus A320-200
Soder Airlines		OY	SDE	SODER	2002	2006	Went bankrupt
Spear Air					1972	1974	Operated Douglas DC-8
T
Turku Air					1974	2016	
W
Wasawings		VW			1981	1988	AOC revoked after crash
Wingo xprs					2009	2010	

== See also ==
- List of airlines of Finland
- List of airports in Finland
