= Finncomm Airlines =

Regional airline from Finland

Finnish Commuter Airlines - "Finncomm Airlines"

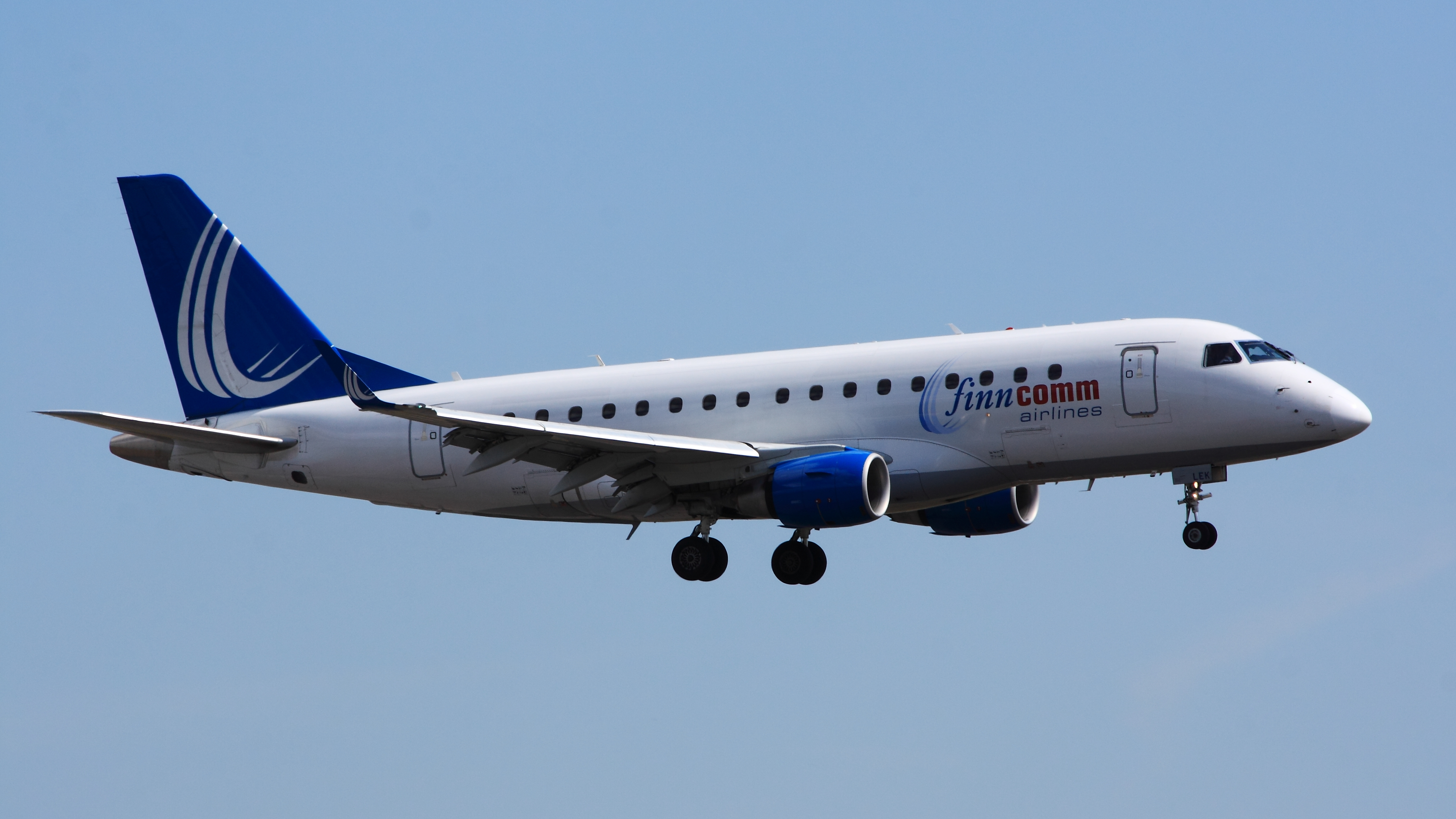
- Embraer E170
IATA	ICAO	Call sign
FC	WBA	WESTBIRD
- Founded: 1993
- Ceased operations: 2015 (changed corporate name to NORRA)
- Hubs: Helsinki Airport
- Fleet size: 16
- Destinations: 20
- Parent company: Flybe Nordic (Finnair Oyj 40%, Flybe 60%)
- Headquarters: Seinäjoki Airport; Ilmajoki, Finland
- Key people: Juhani Pakari, CEO
- Website: fc.fi at the Wayback Machine (archive index)

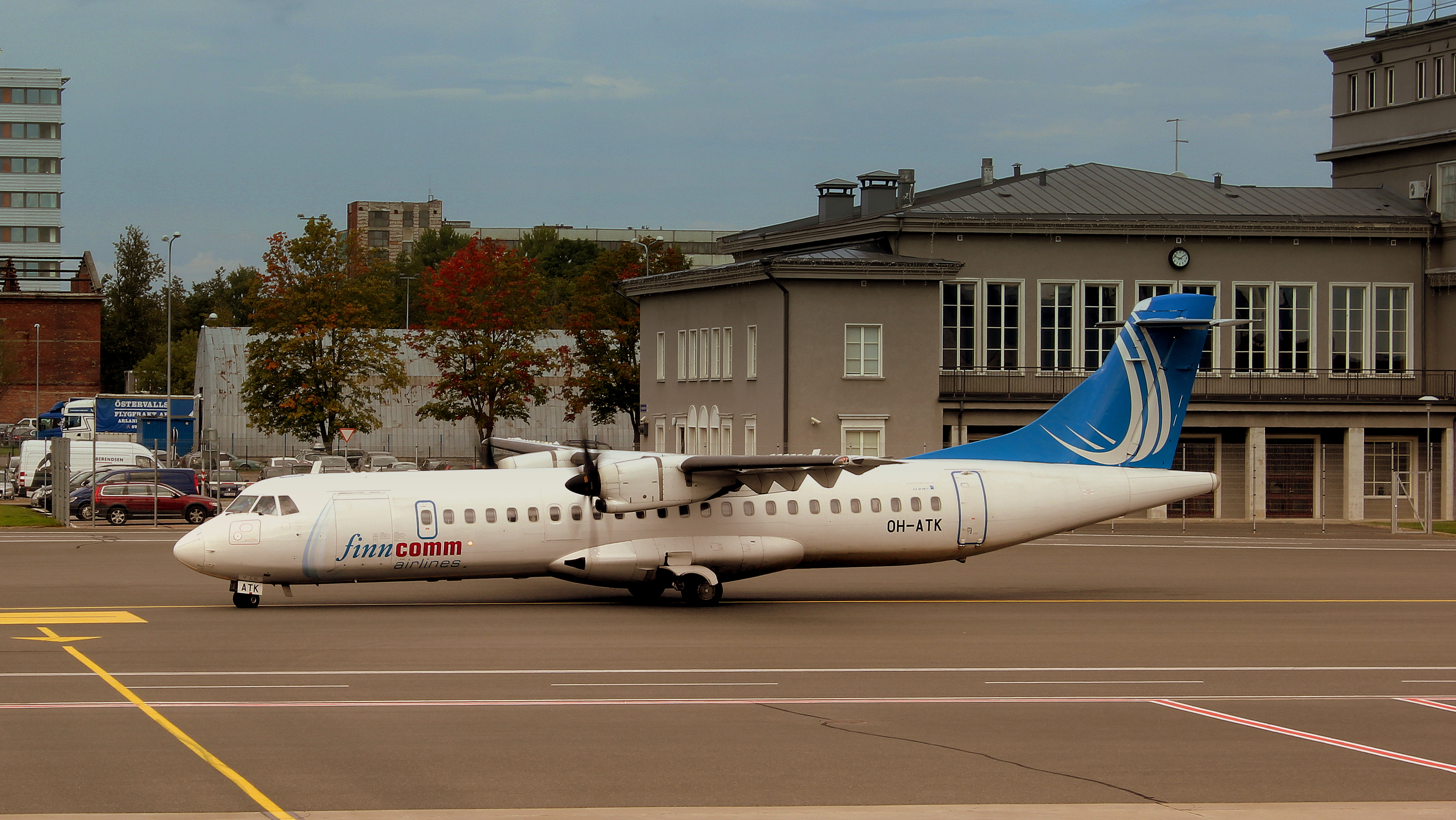
ATR 72 at Tallinn airport in 2013

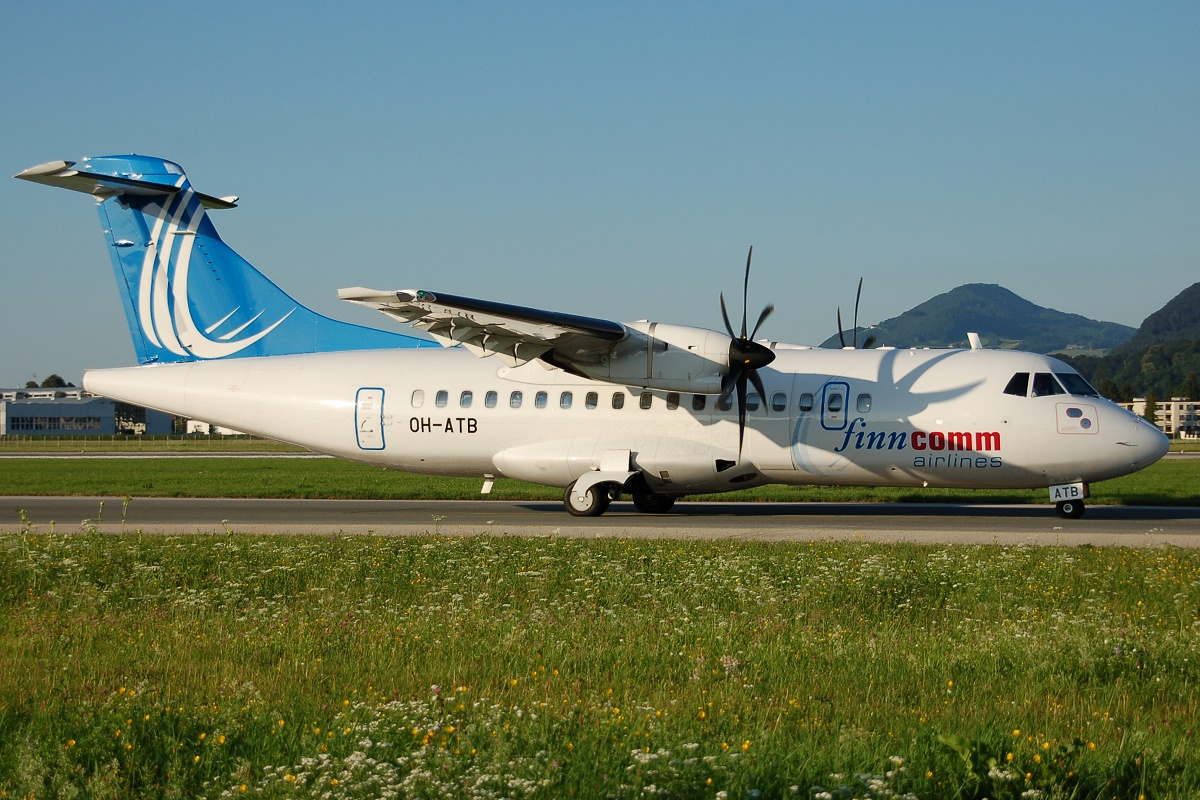
An ATR 42 in 2008

Finnish Commuter Airlines Oy, trading as Finncomm Airlines, was a regional airline with headquarters at Seinäjoki Airport in Ilmajoki, near Seinäjoki Finland. The air carrier operated flights to Estonia, Germany, Lithuania, Romania, Sweden and 16 destinations within Finland from its base at Helsinki Airport. In those times it was the largest domestic air carrier in Finland in terms of number of flights. The airline was a member of the European Regions Airline Association.

The company adopted Flybe Nordic trading name and Flybe Finland operating name from 30 October 2011. It was renamed NORRA-Nordic Regional Airlines on 15 June 2015.

== History ==
=== The beginning ===
In 1993, Juhani Pakari and his father started an air taxi operation flying light aircraft to remote airstrips which other carriers did not serve. Seeking to acquire an Air Operator's Certificate (AOC) to begin scheduled flights, Finncomm partnered with Swedish regional airline Golden Air Flyg in 1999 until they could receive their own AOC. Golden Air meda available a fleet of seven Saab 340s and one Saab 2000 and Finnish Commuter Airlines was in full swing.

In September 2003, the young airline received its own AOC and operations began with one Embraer ERJ-145s leased from Swiss International Air Lines. Inaugural services between Helsinki and Stuttgart were followed, with the delivery of a second ERJ-145 in April 2005, by routes to Düsseldorf and Oslo.

At the 2005 Paris Air Show, the airline announced a $250 million contract for eight ATR-42-500 aircraft with options for a further eight. With the arrival of the first ATR-42 in late November 2005, the airline started to retire the Saab fleet inherited from Golden Air. In 2006, at the Farnborough Air Show, Finncomm signed a contract which converted four of their ATR-42 orders to the larger ATR-72-500. This was further supplemented by the purchase of an additional three ATR-72 aircraft at a list price of $54 million. In January 2008 the carrier announced another order for a further five ATR-72-500 aircraft with deliveries between 2009 and 2011. Once all the orders were fulfilled by ATR, Finnish Commuter Airlines became the largest operator of the ATR regional airliners in Europe.

The air carrier employed over 250 staff and, in 2008, flew 870,000 passengers, an increase of 45% over the previous year despite a tough economic climate. Finncomm co-operated with Finnair to provide feeder traffic for Finnair's international route network. The growth allowed an operating profit of over €9.4 million which was a 9.8% increase over 2007. The Finnish Civil Aviation Authority (FCAA) ordered some changes to operating procedures and temporarily increased the weather minimums of ATR operations following an incident in late 2006. The incident was investigated and some re-training for pilots (regarding new operating procedures) was ordered by FCAA. Weather restrictions were lifted and normal operations resumed.

=== New ownership ===
On 9 September 2010, Finnair Group announced that they had signed a preliminary agreement to acquire all the aircraft from Finnish Commuter Airlines and 20% of its shares for the total sum of €48 million. On 1 July 2011, Finnair and BEA-British European Airways (branded Flybe) announced they were to jointly buy the airline for €25 million. The company was rebranded Flybe Nordic with Flybe Finland operating name. 60% of shares were owned by BEA while Finnair controlled 40%. The fleet was further strengthened with two Embraer E170s which allowed to fly over 70 passenger on longer routes and with speeds higher than ATR turboprops.

=== Further changes ===
In November 2014, British European Airways announced that it would sell its 60% stake in the airline for €1 in an effort to reduce group costs. In February 2015, the Finnish Competition and Consumer Authority approved the sale of the stake (60%) to StaffPoint Holding and G.W. Sohlberg. The 60% share was sold to Finnair as a temporary solution in March 2015 and the airline operated with Finnair's flight codes from 1 May 2015. Completing the new phase the transition to NORRA-Nordic Regional Airlines name on the following 15 June.

== Destinations ==
As of June 2011 Finnish Commuter Airlines operated the following routes:

- Estonia
  - Tallinn – Lennart Meri Tallinn Airport
- Finland
  - Enontekiö – Enontekiö Airport [seasonal]
  - Helsinki – Helsinki Airport base
  - Joensuu – Joensuu Airport
  - Jyväskylä – Jyväskylä Airport
  - Kajaani – Kajaani Airport
  - Kemi/Tornio – Kemi-Tornio Airport
  - Kittilä – Kittilä Airport [seasonal]
  - Kokkola/Jakobstad – Kruunupyy Airport
  - Kuopio – Kuopio Airport
  - Kuusamo – Kuusamo Airport [seasonal]
  - Oulu – Oulu Airport
  - Pori – Pori Airport
  - Savonlinna – Savonlinna Airport
  - Seinäjoki – Seinäjoki Airport
  - Tampere – Tampere-Pirkkala Airport
  - Turku – Turku Airport
  - Vaasa – Vaasa Airport
  - Varkaus – Varkaus Airport
- Germany
  - Stuttgart – Stuttgart Airport
- Latvia
  - Riga – Riga Airport
- Poland
  - Gdańsk – Gdańsk Lech Wałęsa Airport
- Romania
  - Bucharest – Henri Coandă International Airport
- Sweden
  - Norrköping – Norrköping Airport
  - Skellefteå – Skellefteå Airport

== Fleet ==
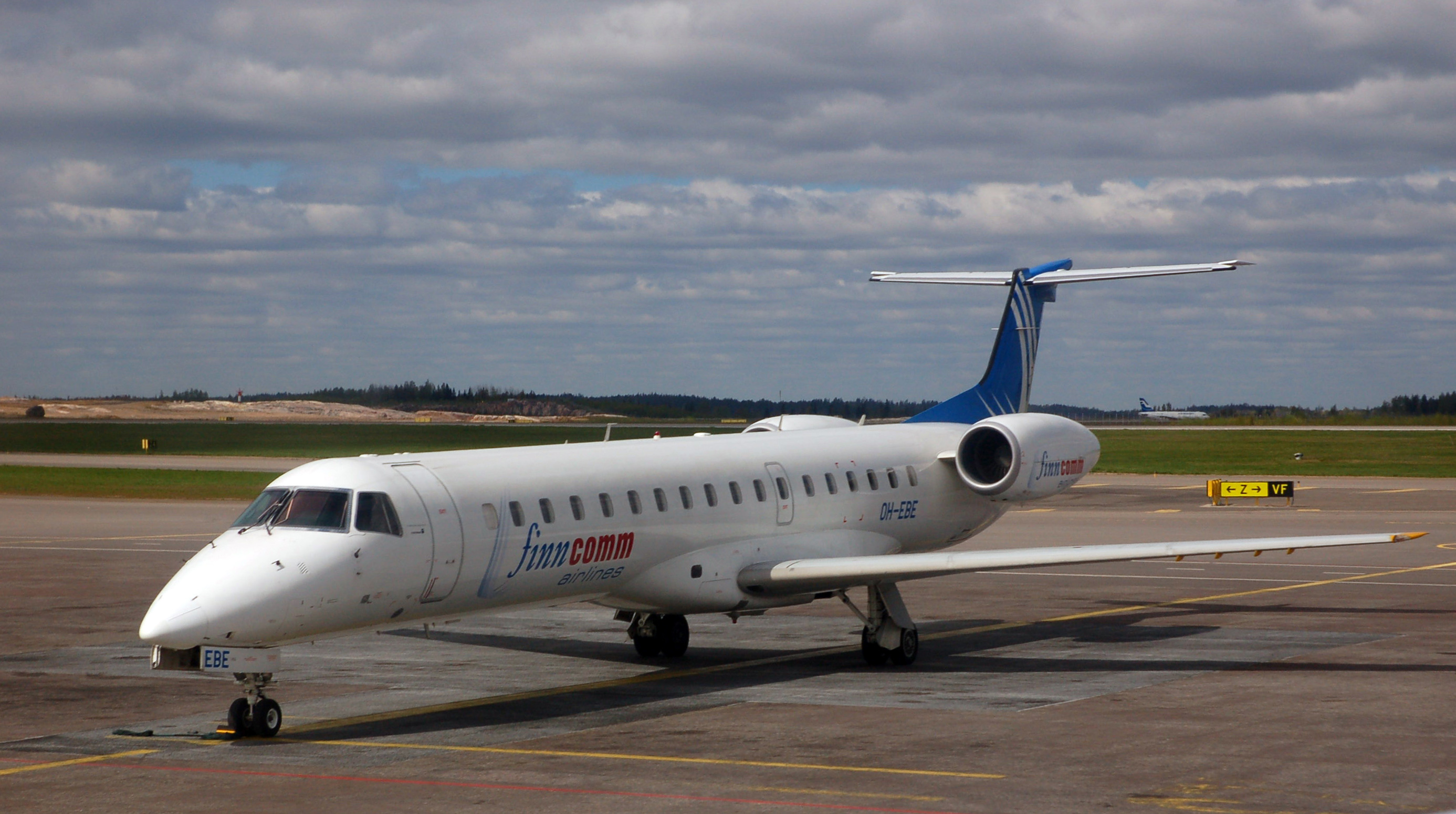
Embraer ERJ-145 later replaced by Embraer E170

As of 13 May 2011 the fleet included the following aircraft:

Finncomm Airlines fleet
Aircraft	In fleet	Orders	Passengers
ATR 42-500	4	0	48
ATR 72-500	10	3	68–72
Embraer E170	2	0	76
Total	16	2	

Finnish Commuter Airlines had announced plans to have 16 ATR42-500 aircraft by the end of 2011, suggesting they planned to convert at least 3 of their options into firm orders.

== Environment ==
Finnish Commuter Airlines mitigated its environmental impact. The carrier utilised a very modern and fuel efficient fleet of ATRs and Embraers which reduced fuel burn and noise. FThe air carrier commented that the ATR fleet saved 70,000 tonnes of fuel and 200,000 tonnes of CO_{2} in a five-year period over a jet fleet. Furthermore, when aircraft were at an airport overnight, they were placed in heated hangars to reduce the amount of de-icing agent used on the aircraft. 300,000 litres of anti-ice solvents were saved annually.
