= Karhumäki (disambiguation) =

Karhumäki is the Finnish name of Medvezhyegorsk, a town in the Republic of Karelia, Russia.

Karhumäki may also refer to:

People

- Juhani Karhumäki (born 1949), Finnish mathematician and one of the students of Arto Salomaa
- Urho Karhumäki (1891–1947), Finnish poet
- Karhumäki brothers, consisted of Niilo and Valto Karhumäki, Finnish aircraft manufacturers, airline founders, and aviation pioneers

Other

- Karhumäki Karhu 48B, a Finnish 1950s four-seat monoplane
- Karhumäki Airways, former name of Karair, a Finnish airline
