= List of airlines of Finland =

This is a list of airlines currently operating in Finland.

== Scheduled airlines ==
Airline	IATA	ICAO	Callsign	Image	Commenced operations	Notes
Finnair	AY	FIN	FINNAIR		1923	Flag carrier. Aero O/Y-Finnish Airlines years 1923-1968
Nordic Regional Airlines	N7		FINNAIR		2015	FinnComm Airlines years 1993-2011 and Flybe Finland trading name years 2011-2016

== Charter airlines ==
Airline	IATA	ICAO	Callsign	Image	Commenced operations	Notes
Jetflite		JEF			1980	
Scanwings		ABF			1977	

== See also ==
- List of airlines
- List of defunct airlines of Europe
- List of defunct airlines of Finland
