= EFSI =

EFSI may refer to:

- the ICAO code of Seinäjoki Airport in Finland,
- the European Fund for Strategic Investments, of the European Investment Bank
