= Aero Airlines =

Estonian airline, 2000 to 2008

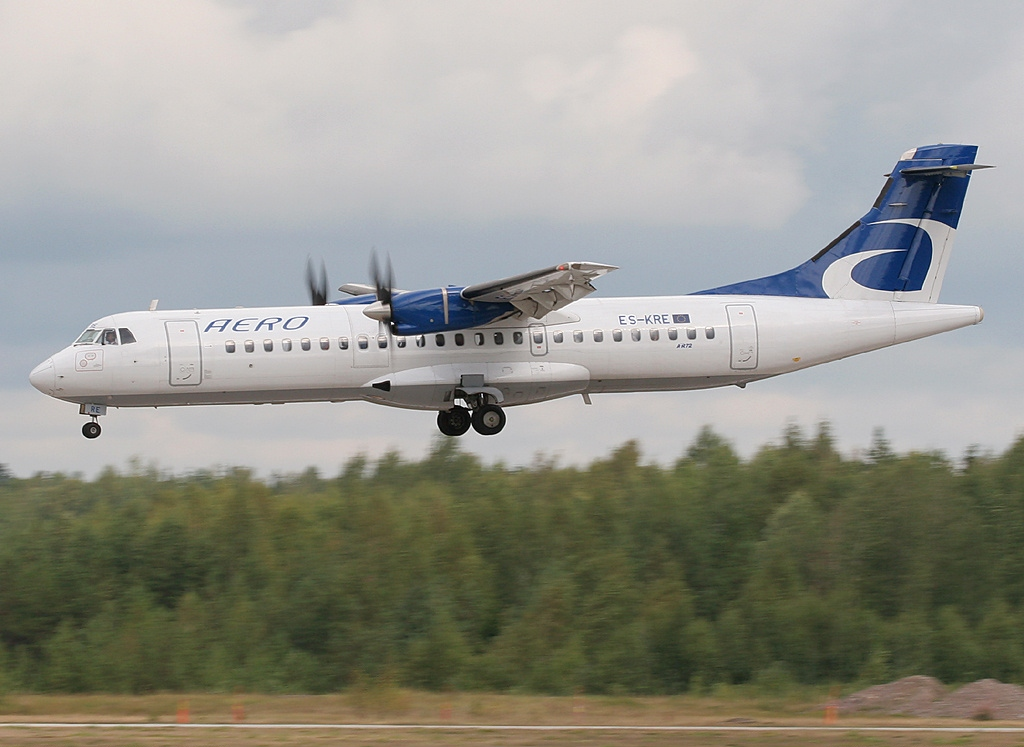
- ATR-72-201
IATA	ICAO	Call sign
EE	EAY	REVAL
- Founded: 2000
- Commenced operations: 2002
- Ceased operations: 2008
- Hubs: Lennart Meri Tallinn Airport
- Fleet size: 0
- Destinations: 0
- Headquarters: Tallinn, Estonia

Airlines Aero was a regional airline based in Tallinn, Estonia. It operated services between three Finnish destinations, as well as international flights to Tallinn. All of their flights were operated with Finnair's designation AY. Its main bases were Helsinki-Vantaa and Tallinn-Lennart Meri. Aero halted operations in January 2008.

== History ==
The name harkens back to Aero Airlines's and Finnair's first incarnation, Aero OY, founded in 1923. Finnair retained Aero AS's IATA designator AY, while new Aero Airlines flew as EE. The airline was established in 2000, and started operations in March 2002, within the Baltic region. It was owned by Aero Holding (51%) and Finnair (49%), but the whole ownership was later transferred to the latter. In March 2007 the regional air carrier had 128 employees.

Aero scaled down its operations during 2007, and finally flew its last flight on 6 January 2008. All its routes were operated by Flybe and Finnair.

== Destinations ==
Aero Airlines operated services to the following scheduled destinations (at December 2007): Helsinki, Tallinn, Turku and Vaasa.

== Fleet ==
The Aero Airlines fleet consisted of ATR-72-201 airplanes, which were formerly operated by its parent company Finnair. The last two were sold to UTair when Aero ceased its operations.
