= Karair =

Finnish airline 1947–1996

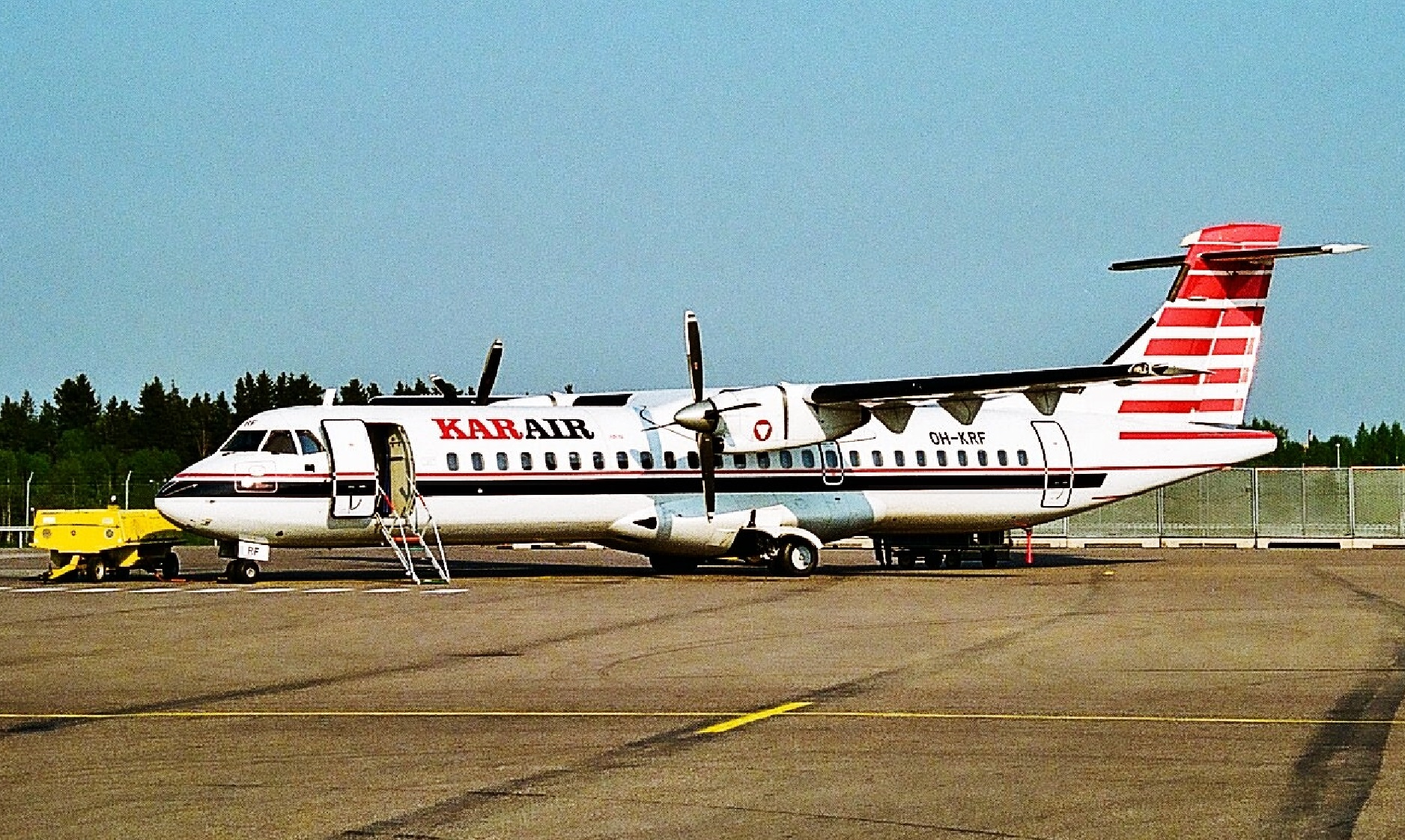
- ATR 72
IATA	ICAO	Call sign
KR	KAR	—
- Founded: 1947
- Ceased operations: 1996 (merged into Finnair)
- Hubs: Helsinki Airport
- Parent company: Finnair (since 1963)
- Headquarters: Helsinki, Finland
- Key people: Niilo and Valto Karhumäki (founders)

Karair Oy was a Finnish airline, and one of the oldest airlines of Finland. After having operated charter flights and then scheduled passenger flights, the company became a subsidiary of Finnair 1963, mainly focusing on holiday charter business and limited regional routes.

== History ==
=== The origins ===
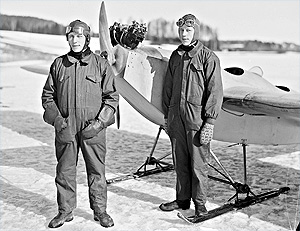
Niilo and Valto Karhumäki, the founders of the airline, in 1927.

Born in Multia, Finland in 1902 and 1905, respectively, brothers Niilo and Valto Karhumäki moved to Jyväskylä where, in late 1924, they established 'Veljekset Karhumäki Oy (Karhumäki brothers), a company which during the 1930s dealt with aircraft maintenance, aerial photography, pilot training, aerial acrobatics. In 1929 high-wing, floats-equipped and two-seats Tiira monoplane was manufactured. In order to start a collaboration with the Finnish Air Force, the company headquarters were moved to Kuorevesi. During World War II the concern activities were merged into the Valtion Lentokonetehdas company, manufacturer of a number of military aircraft. After the war the two brothers designed the Karhumäki Karhu 48B light airplane, which was produced in a small number during the 1950s.

In June 1950 the company started flying a few domestic schedules. The fleet was limited in numbers and aircraft sizes: Airspeed AS.40, DeHavilland DH.89, Lockheed L-18. All these operations were halted in late 1950s as transferred to the sister company Karhumäki Airways O/Y.

=== Karhumäki Airways O/Y ===
This Veljekset Karhumäki subsidiary was established in 1951 and started scheduled passenger flights between Helsinki and Joensuu, Jyväskylä, Vaasa and Sundsvall. in June of that same year with aircraft made available by the parent company. Then the airline inherited the Lockheed L-18 and, in the second part of the 1950s, added four more suitable Douglas DC-3 and later two more comfortable Convair CV-440 Metropolitan. The first international flight (to Stockholm) took place in that same year, followed by flights to Málaga in coincidence with holiday packages.

=== Kar-Air O/Y ===
On 1 January 1957 the corporate name was changed to more modern Kar-Air O/Y. A Swedish subsidiary was established, which from 1961 onwards operated a single Douglas DC-6 on charter flights to Southern Europe. On 1 November 1963 32% of the airline ownership was taken over by flag carrier Aero O/Y (Finnair from 1968). Kar-Air encountered financial difficulties when its two CV 440s were damaged in hard landings and had to be taken out of service for a period in 1963. The ownership demanded Kar-Air to cease domestic flying, concentrating on charter flights (mainly to the Mediterranean) holiday resorts. For this purpose, Aero O/Y handed over two of its Douglas DC-6 aircraft, which Kar-Air also used for multiple stopover round-the-world flights. By 1965 all scheduled operations had been abandoned and the air carrier concentrated on charter business. Three DC-6s were already in the fleet and it was deliberated to convert one of them to swing-tail configuration. The work was accomplished by Sabena engineering department in Brussels. After the conversion the four-engined aircraft could carry loads of up to 18 metres long or six pallets 108x88, for a maximum payload of 11,5 tons. It flew several schedules to United Kingdom (London and Manchester) and to Germany (Frankfurt and Düsseldorf) on Finnair behalf. Two other Douglas DC 6s were frequently operated to transport Finnish contingent to UNO peace-keeping detachments while DC 3s mainly performed aerial survey works.

The DC-6s were the backbone of the passenger fleet until 1968, when the jet age arrived with the introduction of a 189-seat Douglas DC-8 series 62, instrumental in operating long haul flights. Also in 1968 a De Havilland of Canada DHC-6 Twin Otter was added to the fleet. In this same year, the airline underwent a rebranding, being known as Karair, also styled KarAir henceforth. Over the following years, Karair reduced its fleet, because charter contracts with Finnair terminated.

=== The last years ===
In 1986, two Airbus A300 wide-body airliners joined the fleet, again leased from Finnair and intended exclusively for charter flights. Finnair's plans with the subsidiary changed from 1989, when the first of seven ATR 72 regional turboprop airliner was added to the fleet, and the A300s in turn left the following year. From then, scheduled passenger flights, both domestically and to the neighbour nations, on behalf of Finnair were operated.

On 3 February 1989, Finnair bought further shares to hold a total of 90% of the Karair ownership, which was further increased to 97.6% in 1993. These times were characterized by financial problems because of the recession of the early 1990s, which led to Finnair announcing a full take-over of Karair in December 1995. Karair had started integrating its operations into the flag carrier in September 1990. Karair fleet and operations were progressively merged into Finnair, a move which was fully accomplished in October 1996. In 2002, a court deemed the take-over illegal, and Finnair was forced to salvage the remaining Karair stocks.

== Destinations ==
Between 1950 and 1963 (when Aero O/Y had not yet acquired the majority stake), Kar-Air operated scheduled flights to the following destinations, with further ones accessible on co-operative flights of SAS and Aero O/Y:

=== Finland ===
- Helsinki – Helsinki Airport (hub)
- Joensuu – Joensuu Airport
- Kauhava – Kauhava Airport
- Kokkola – Kokkola-Pietarsaari Airport
- Lappeenranta – Lappeenranta Airport
- Tampere – Tampere-Pirkkala Airport
- Vaasa – Vaasa Airport

=== Luxemburg ===
- Luxembourg – Findel Airport

=== Spain ===
- Barcelona – Barcelona El Prat Airport
- Málaga – Málaga Airport
- Tenerife – Los Rodeos Airport

=== Sweden ===
- Gothenburg – Gothenburg City Airport
- Stockholm – Stockholm-Bromma Airport (focus city)
- Sundsvall – Sundsvall-Härnösand Airport

Kar-Air was not only operating passenger and cargo services, but until also ore-finding flights using a Lockheed Lodestar (until 1972), a Douglas DC-3 (1972–1980), and after that a de Havilland Canada DHC-6 Twin Otter.

== Fleet ==
=== Fleet of Veljekset Karhumäki and Karhumäki Airways O/Y ===
The fleet in years 1949–2002, according to Tervonen:

Aircraft type	Registration	Built	Commissioned	Decommissioned	Further information	Removed from Finnish register
Karhu -48/38b “Tavi”	OH-VKL/OH-KUA	1949	1959	1961 (sold)	Currently in the Finnish Aviation Museum	1973
VL Viima II/IIB	OH-VKS/OH-VIA	1951	1951	1959	Sold	1964
Lockheed L-18-56 Lodestar	OH-VKU	1940	1953	1972	In the Finnish Aviation Museum	1972
Douglas C-53 Skytrooper	OH-VKA	1941	1954	1957	Transferred to Kar-Air	1969
Douglas DC-3A-214	OH-VKB	1945–46	1954	1957	Transferred to Kar-Air	1971
Douglas DC-3D	OH-VKC	1945–46	1954	1957	Transferred to Kar-Air	1971
Piper PA-18A 150 Super Cub	OH-VKV	1960	1960	1975	Used as towing aircraft	
Lockheed L-18-56 Lodestar	—	1940	1961	1961	Used for spare parts	
Aero Commander S-2R-T34 Thrush Commander	OH-VKY	1973	1973	1974	Sold to Sweden	1978
Cessna A188B Agtruck	OH-VKZ	1974	1974	1976	Destroyed	1977
Cessna A188B Agtruck	OH-VKT/OH-CIX	1975	1975	1976	Sold to Finnaviation	1985
Cessna T188C AgHusky	OH-VKW	1980	1981	1987	Sold	
Piper PA-25-235 Pawnee B	OH-PDW	1965	1984	1988	Owned by the Finnish Sports Aviation School	
Piper PA-25-235 Pawnee B	OH-PDZ	1966	1984	2002 (?)		2004 (?)
Cessna A188B Agtruck	OH-CIY	1982	1989	1999		2001

=== Gallery ===
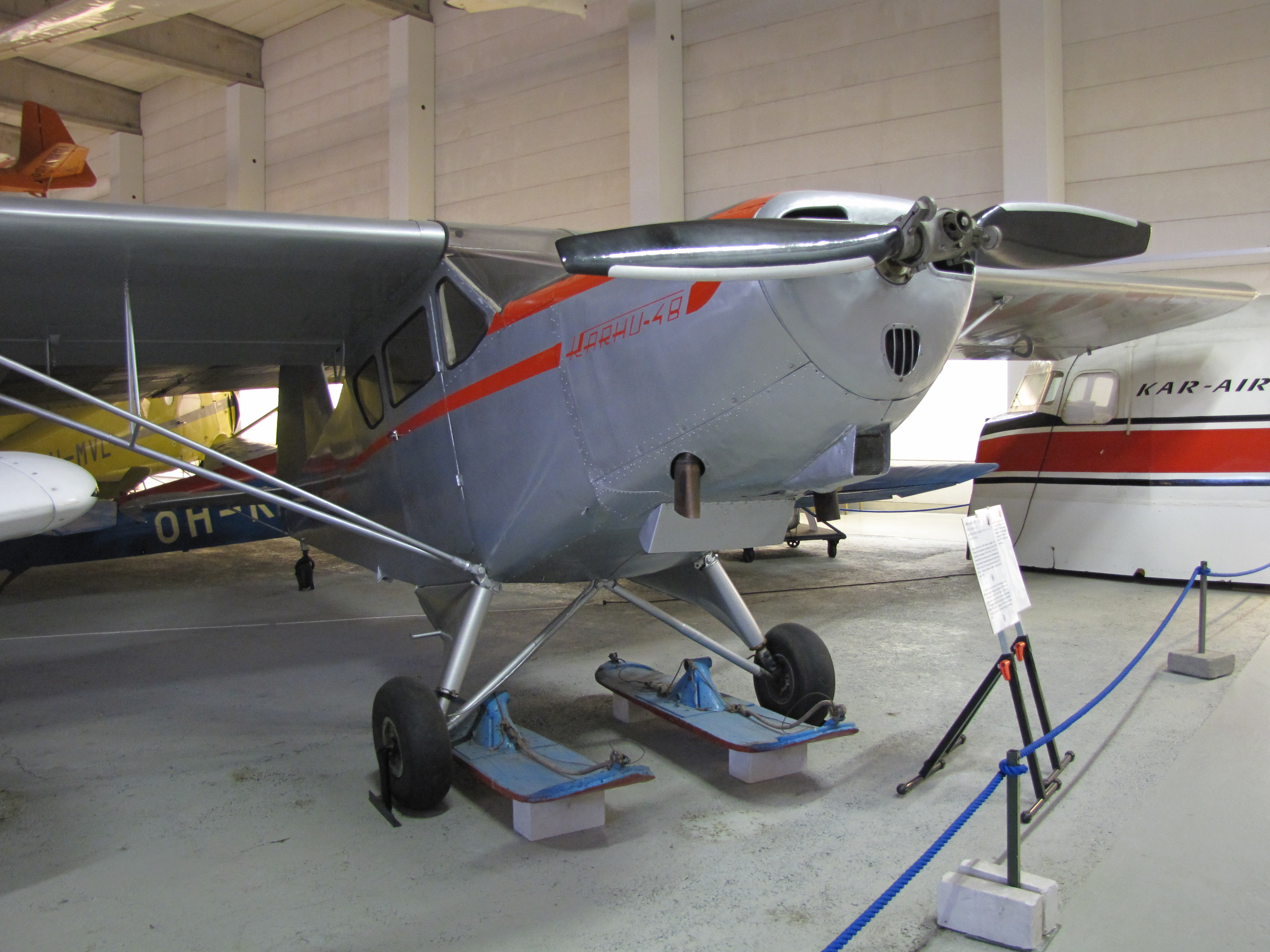
Karhumäki Karhu 48B currently in the Finnish Aviation Museum

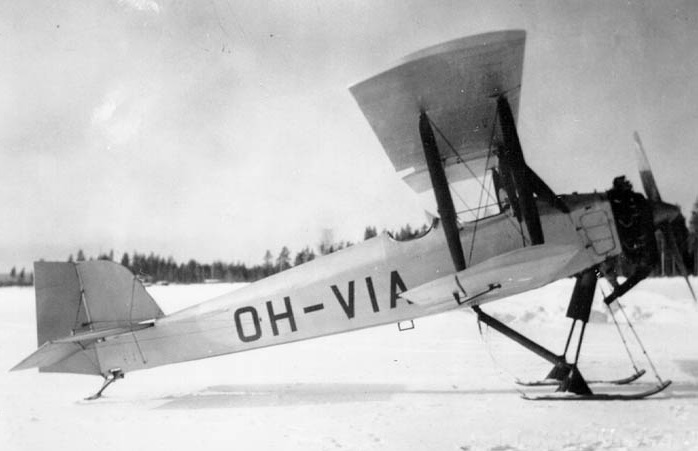
VL Sääski II

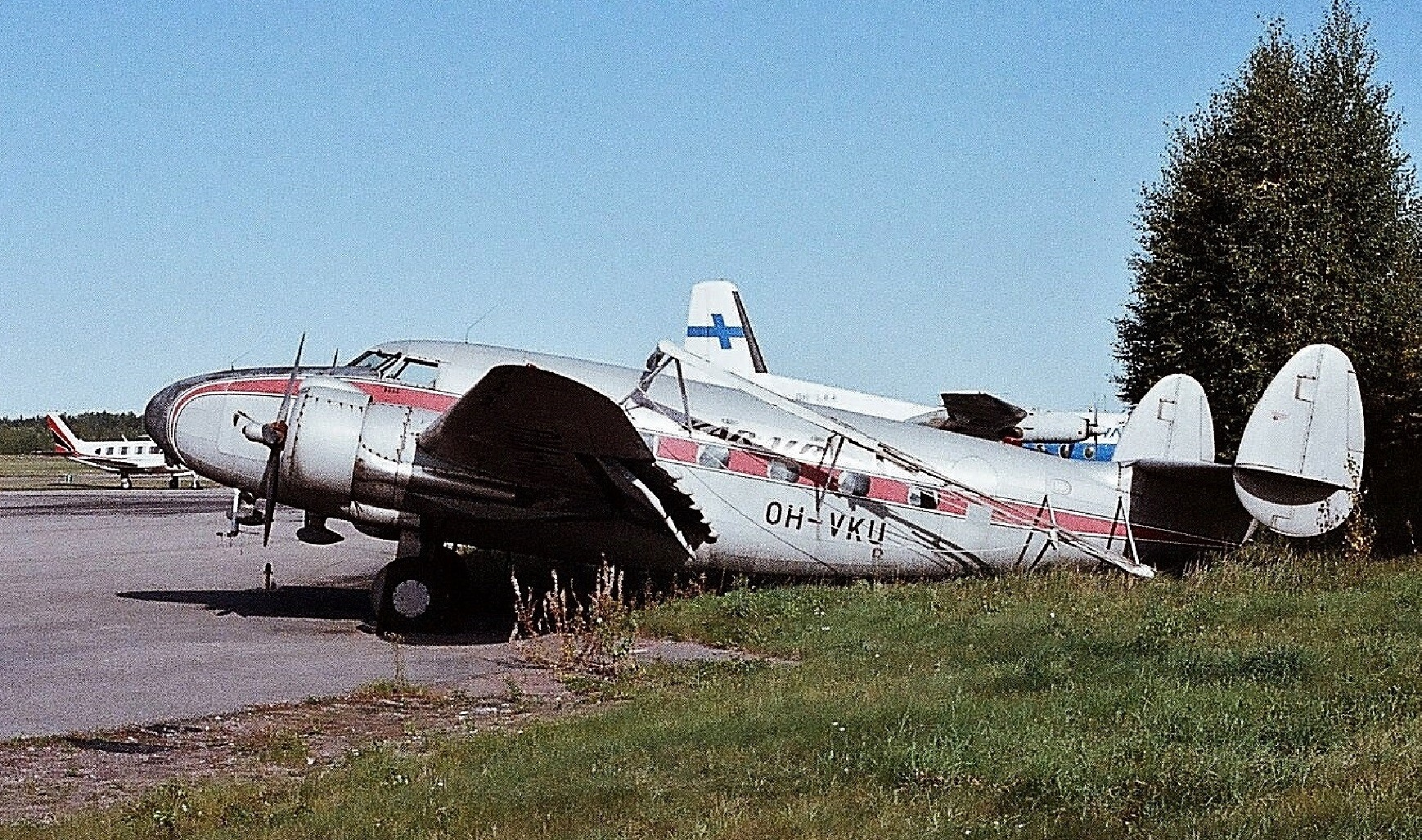
Lockheed L-18-56 Lodestar

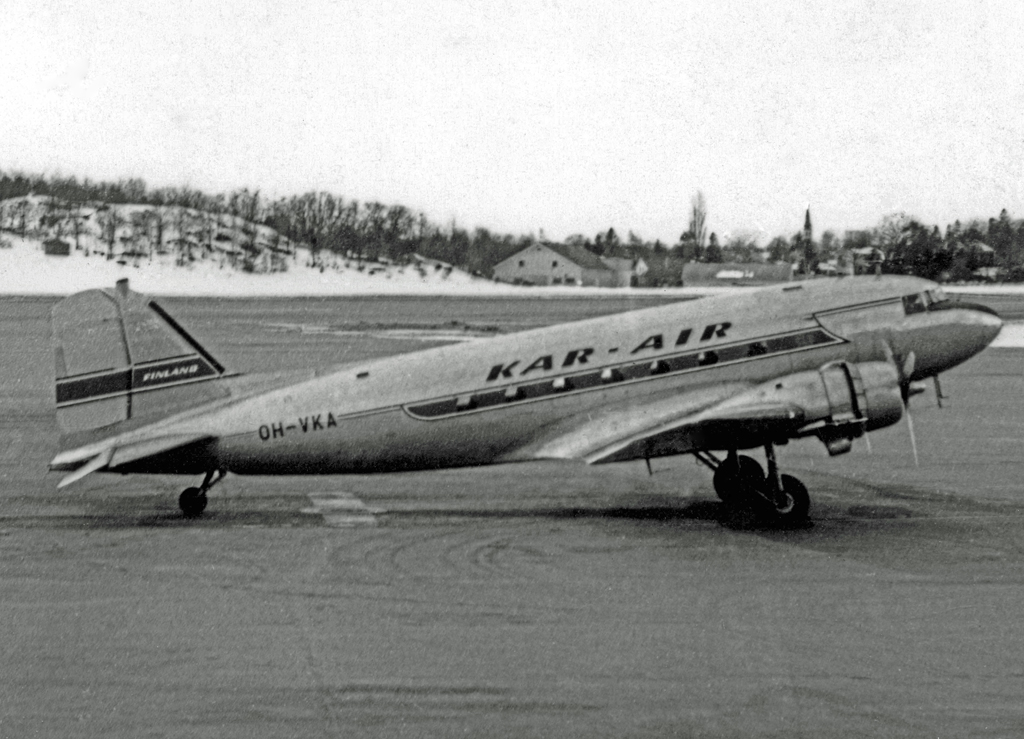
Douglas DC-3 at Stockholm-Bromma Airport

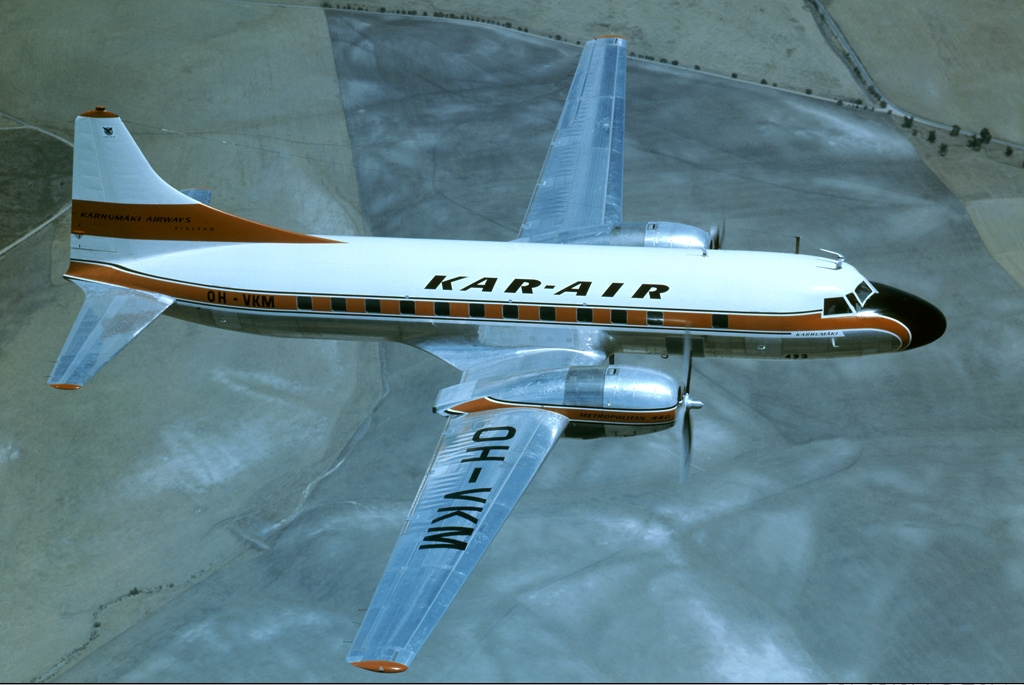
Convair CV-440 in 1957, before delivery

=== Fleet ===
The fleet in years 1957–1996, according to Tervonen (2004, 2007):

Aircraft type	Registration	Built	Commissioned	Decommissioned	Further information	Removed from Finnish register
Douglas C-53 Skytrooper	OH-VKA	1941	1957	1969	Sold to Norway	1969
Douglas DC-3A-214	OH-VKB	1945–46	1957	1979	In Finnish Aviation Museum	1971
Douglas DC-3D	OH-VKC	1945–46	1957	1964	Sold to Sweden	1971
Convair CV-440-98 Metropolitan	OH-VKM	1957	1957	1973	Destroyed in 1995	1973
Convair CV-440-98 Metropolitan	OH-VKN/OH-LRH	1958	1958	1978	Sold to Norway	1977
Douglas C-47-DL	OH-VKD	1942	1960	1964	Sold to Norway	1969
Douglas DC-6B	OH-KDC/SE-BDX	1953	1961	1971	Sold to Belgium	1972
Douglas DC-6B	OH-KDB	1958	1965	1972	Sold to Belgium	1972
Douglas DC-6B/D6BST	OH-KDA	1957	1964	1981	Destroyed in Alaska	1982
De Havilland of Canada DHC-6 Twin Otter	OH-KOA	1968	1972	1973	Scrapped	1973
Douglas DC-8-51	OH-KDM	1961	1972	1985	Sold to Belgium	1985
De Havilland of Canada DHC-6 Twin Otter Mk. 300	OH-KOG	1979	1979	1996	Transferred to Finnair	
Douglas DC-8-62	OH-LFZ	1968	1984	1987	Sold to United States	1987
Airbus A300B4	OH-LAA	1984	1986	1994	Transferred to Finnair	1998
Airbus A300B4	OH-LAB	1984	1987	1994	Transferred to Finnair	1998
Aérospatiale ATR 72	OH-KRA	1989	1990	1996	Transferred to Finnair	2005
Aérospatiale ATR 72	OH-KRB	1989	1990	1996	Transferred to Finnair	2005
Aérospatiale ATR 72	OH-KRC	1989	1990	1996	Transferred to Finnair	2005
Aérospatiale ATR 72	OH-LTR/OH-KRD	1990	1990	1996	Transferred to Finnair, later to Aero Airlines	2005
Aérospatiale ATR 72	OH-KRE	1990	1990	1996	Transferred to Finnair, later to Aero Airlines	2005
Aérospatiale ATR 72	OH-LTE	1987	1990	1990	Sold to France	1990
Aérospatiale ATR 72	OH-KRF	1992	1992	1996	Transferred to Finnair, later to Aero Airlines	2005

=== Gallery ===
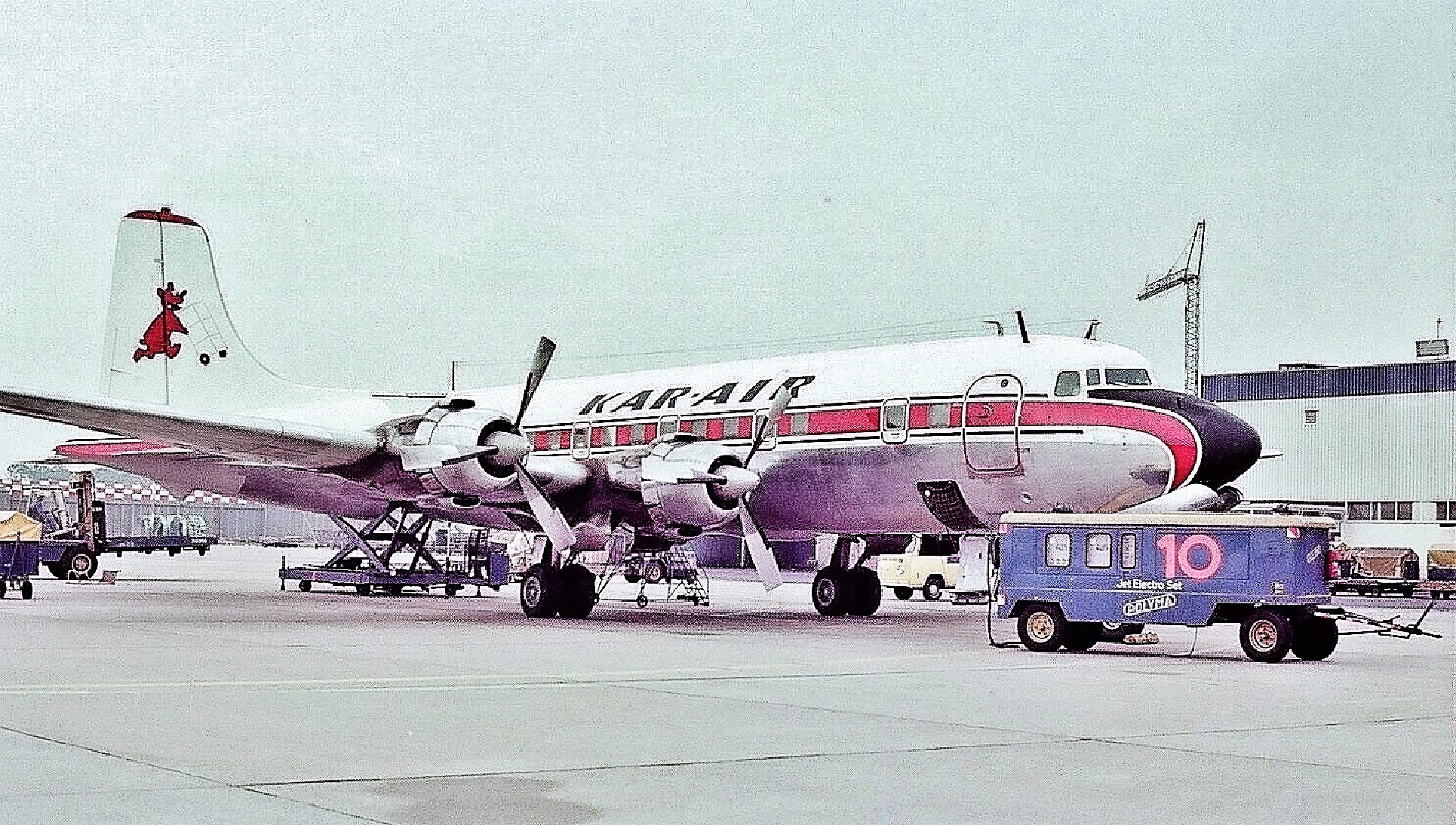
Douglas DC-6B with open swing tail at Düsseldorf Airport in 1976

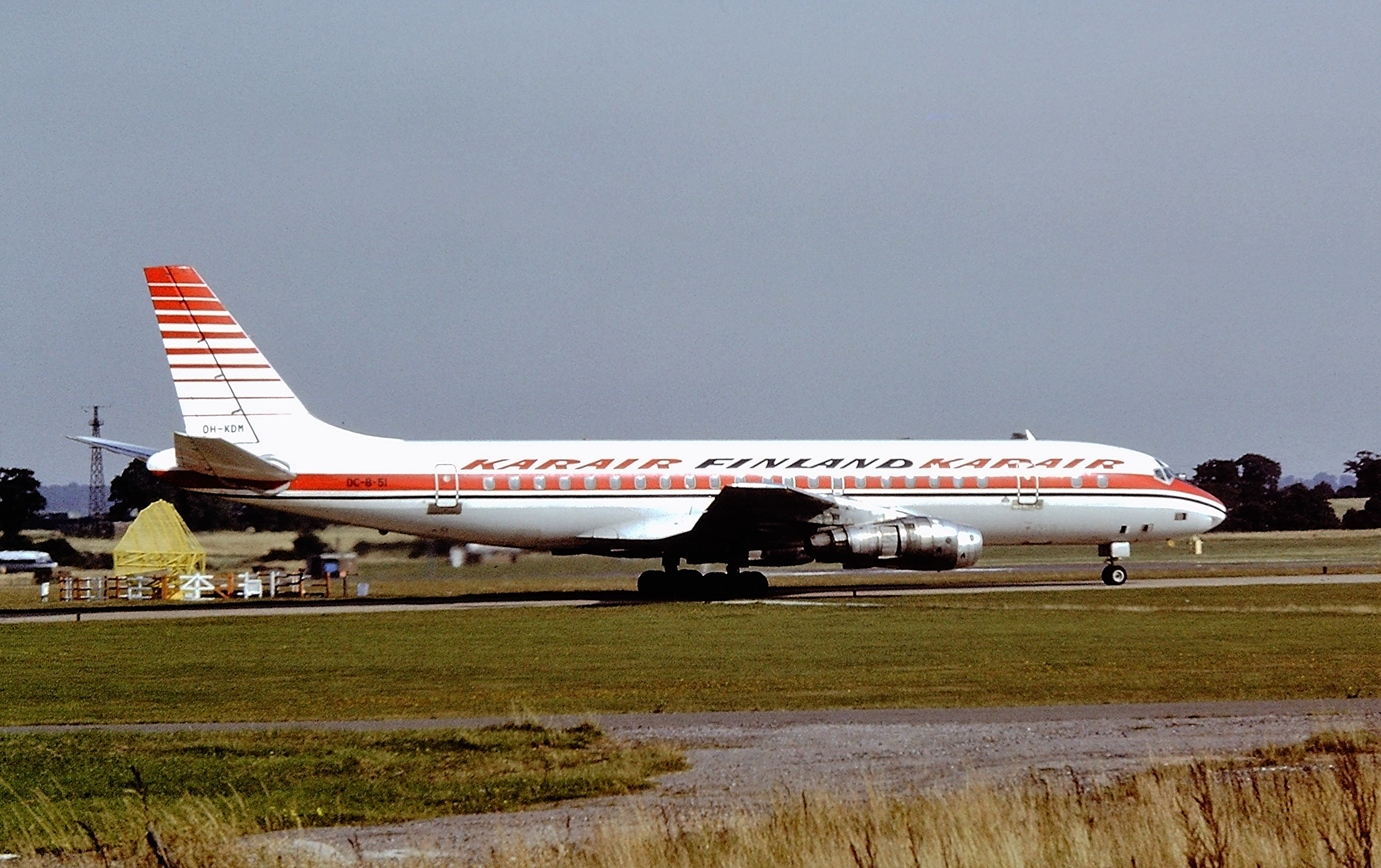
Douglas DC-8 at Birmingham Airport in 1979

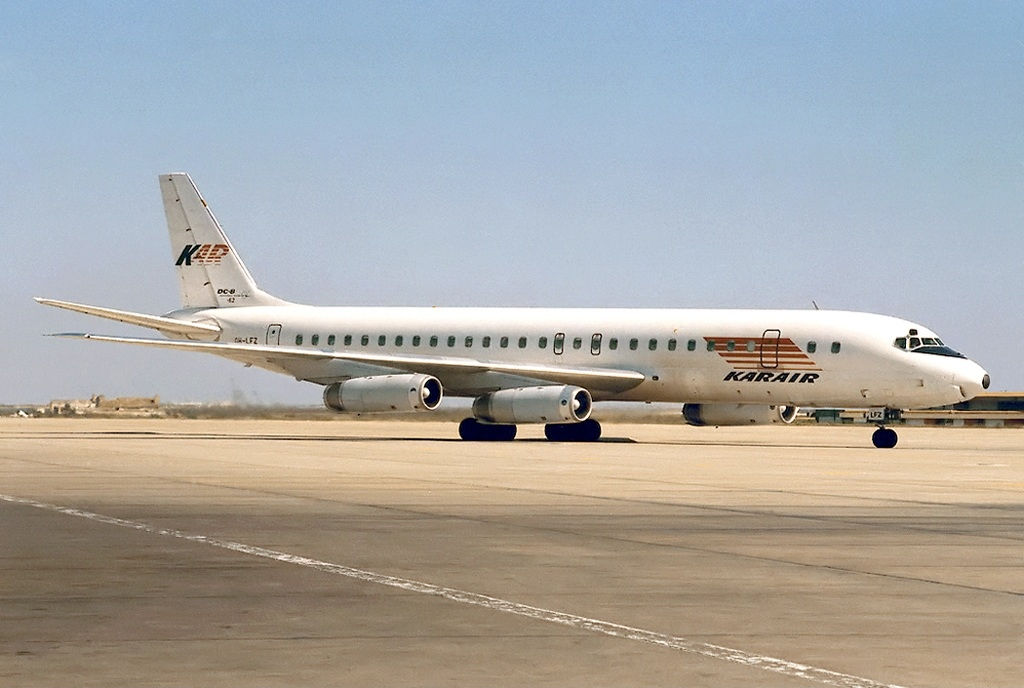
Douglas DC-8-62 in very simplified colors

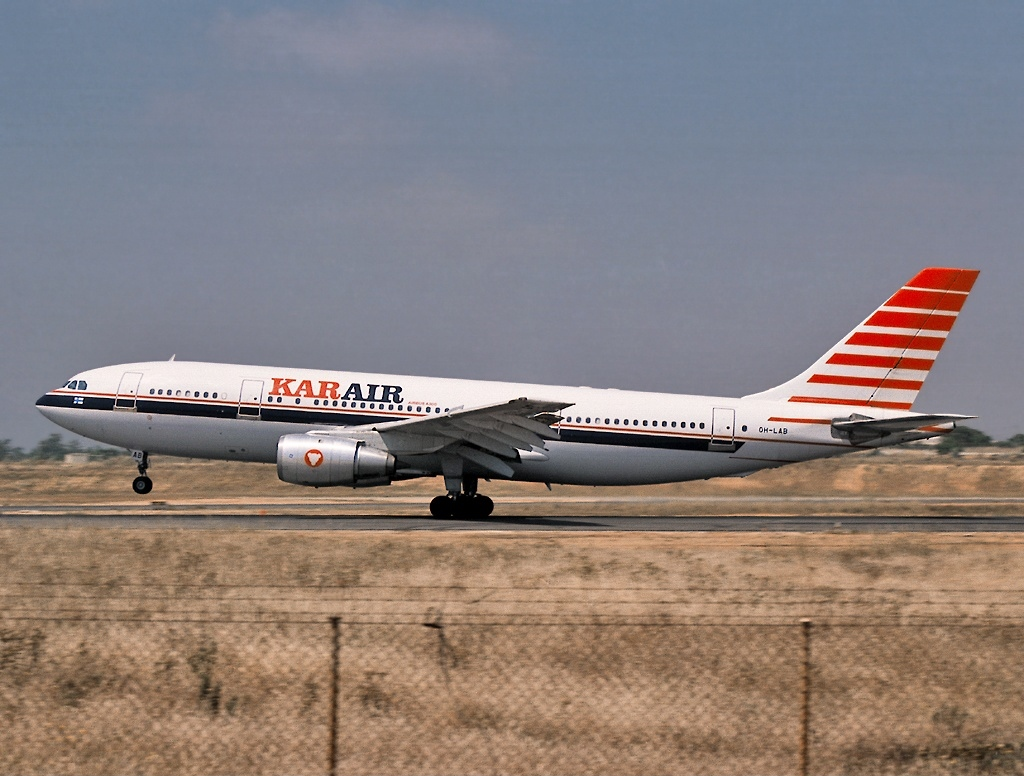
Airbus A300 at Faro Airport in 1991

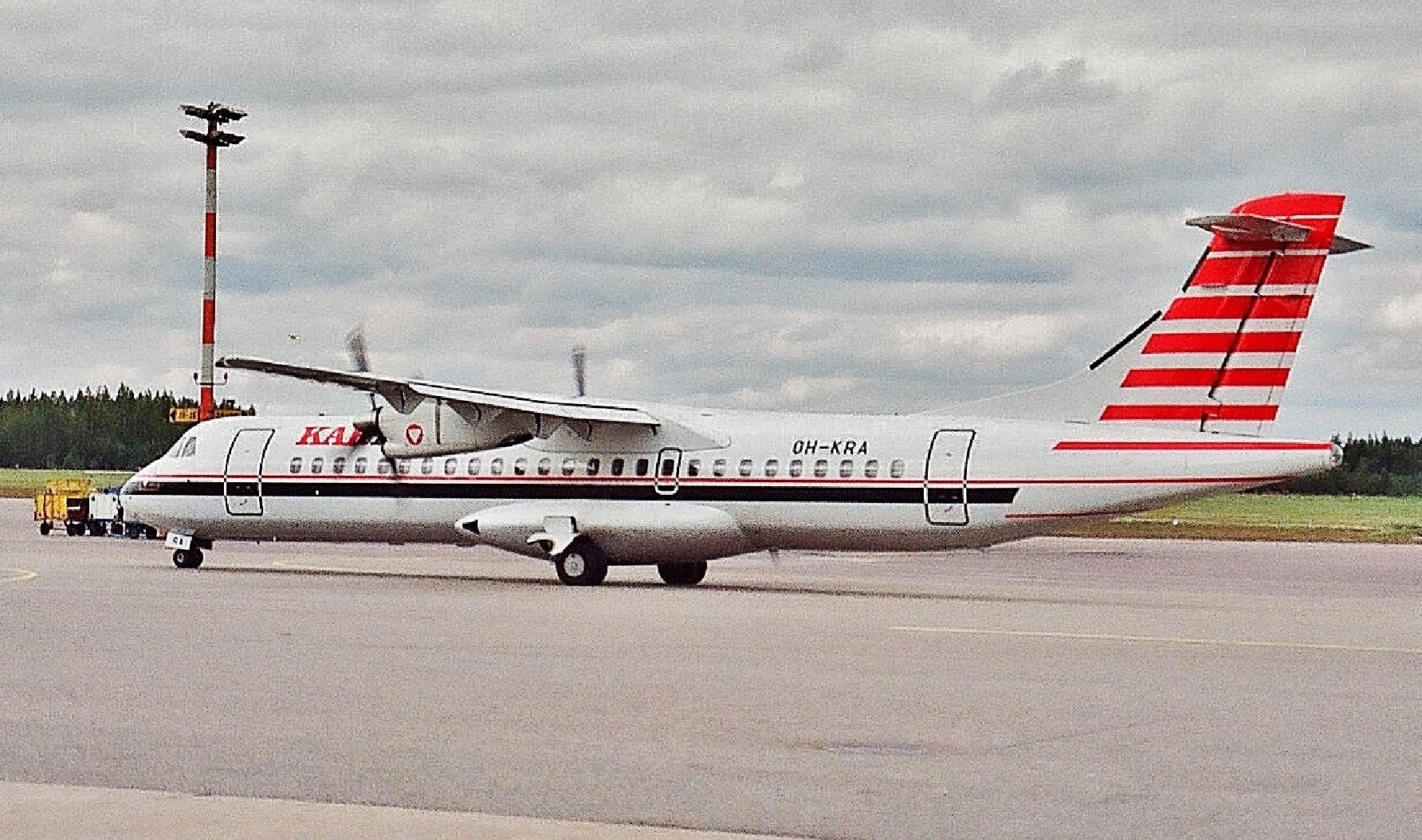
ATR 72 at Helsinki Airport in 1990

=== Former Kar-Air planes today ===
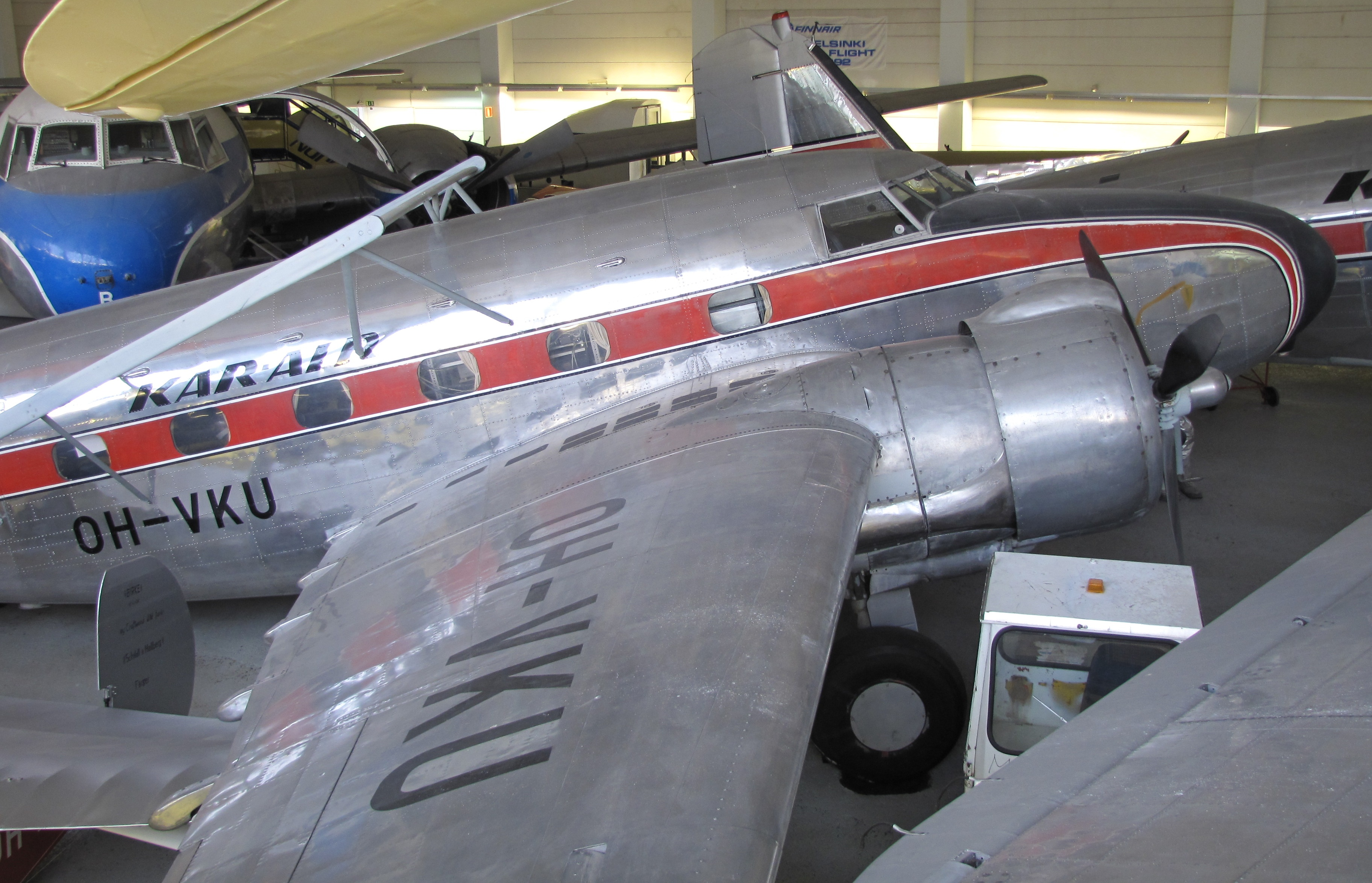
Lockheed Lodestar

The Finnish Aviation Museum near the Helsinki-Vantaa airport had on display two Kar-Air planes, Lockheed L-18 Lodestar OH-VKU, the “Golden Hoe”, and one of the oldest DC-3s in the world, the OH-VKB. A former Kar-Air DC-3 (OH-VKA), may be seen at the Munich airport in Germany, however in Swissair livery, although the plane never flew for that company. A former Kar-Air Convair Metropolitan is still flying in Haiti (HH-VAH).

A sister plane of the OH-VKN has been painted in the original Kar-Air livery at Málaga Airport, for the 50th anniversary of the airport, since OH-VKN was the first plane ever to have landed there. This "replica" is owned by the Málaga Aviation Museum.

== Accidents ==
- On 13 March 1957 a Douglas DC-3D (OH-VKC) was damaged slightly, when a Pan Am Douglas DC-6B hit the plane's rudder. However, the plane was in use until 1964.
- On 8 February 1960 flight KR-100 from Helsinki to Joensuu: a Douglas DC-53 Skytrooper (OH-VKA) stalled while take-off and was slightly damaged. The plane remained in use by the company until 1969.
- On 19 August 1963 a Convair CV-440-98 Metropolitan (OH-VKM) was damaged during landing in Helsinki. The landing took place during a thunderstorm, and the plane bounced three times, and finally its nose landing gear gave in. The plane's nose dove, both propellers touched the ground, and the plane dragged on along the runway ca. 1 300 metres. The plane was repaired by the following January, and it was used by the company until 1973.

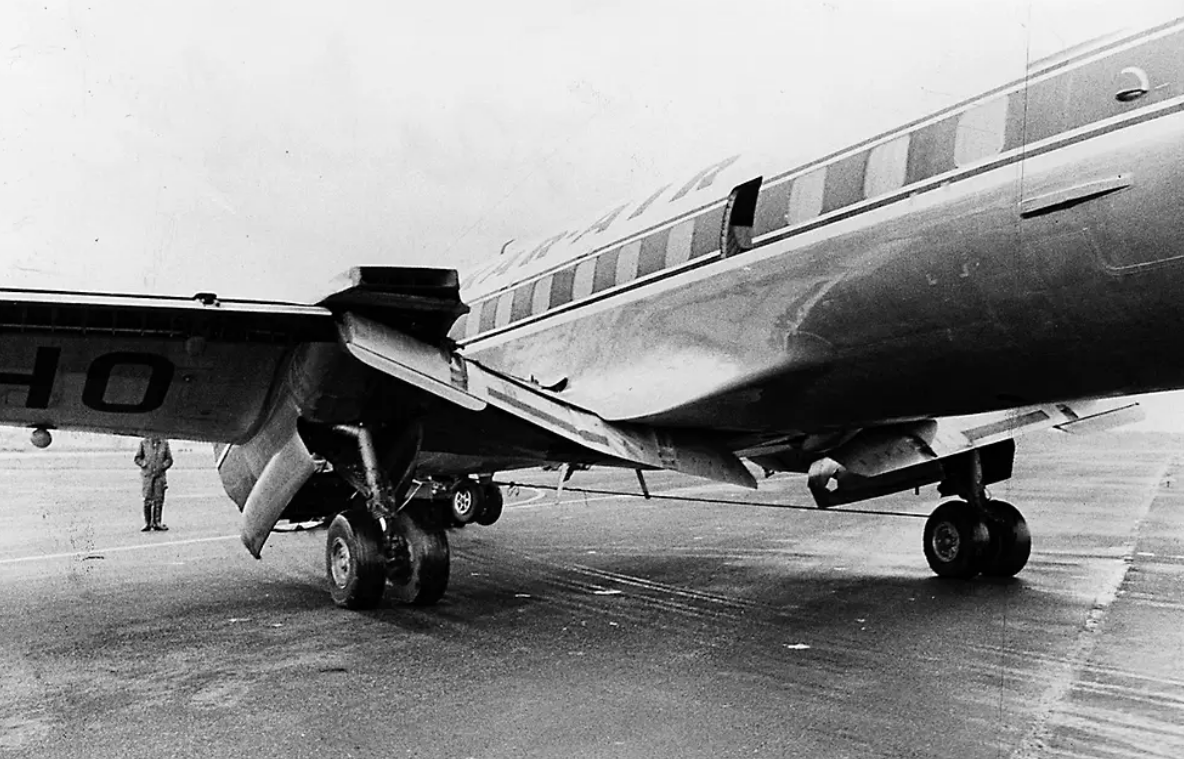
Convair CV-440-98 Metropolitan OH-VKN after the hard landing at Helsinki-Vantaa airport.

- On 21 August 1963 a second Convair CV-440-98 Metropolitan (OH-VKN) was also damaged during landing in Helsinki. The plane bounced three times on the runway, and in the last bounce the nose landing gear suffered a fracture and the left wing was bent. The plane's nose dove and the propellers touched the ground, and finally it plane was dragged to the lawn left of the runway. One of the factors in both Convair Metropolitan accidents was the policy that the air traffic control employees had been forbidden to give a complete disclosure of the airport's weather conditions to approaching aircraft. The information disclosed concerned only wind direction and speed, not e.g. possible thunderstorms. The pilot of OH-VKN lost sight of the runway at a critical moment due to torrential rain and a flash of lightning, due to which he could not see for a moment. The insurance company decided to buy the plane, but in the end it was repaired and commissioned again in January 1967, after it was “crossed” with a similar plane that was bought from Yugoslavia. The plane was used by the company until 1978.
- On 7 November 1969 a Douglas DC-3A-214 (OH-VKB) was damaged due to stalling during take-off, when it was supposed to go on an inspection flight to check the ILS system. The left outer wing had to be repaired. The plane was used by the company until 1979.
- On 5 February 1973 a De Havilland of Canada DHC-6 Twin Otter was damaged during an emergency landing at Iinattijärvi near Pudasjärvi. Both pilots and one passenger were injured. The right engine had broken due to incorrect maintenance job in Norway.
- On 10 August 1974 a Piper PA-18A 150 Super Cub was damaged in Hirvivaara, Juuka due to engine failure during take-off. The plane was repaired and used by the company until 1978.
- In September 1974, an Aero Commander S-2R-T34 Thrush Commander was badly damaged during an emergency landing in Hirvivaara, Juuka. The connecting rod of the engine had been broken.
- On 14 November 1988, an Embraer EMB 110 Bandeirante the company had rented off to Wasawings was destroyed in a crash in Ilmajoki. The plane had two pilots and 10 passengers. The pilots and two passengers were killed. Wasawings had been breaking aviation rules repeatedly, and in the end their licence was revoked.
- On 21 August 1996 an Estonian Air loader was killed, when the blade of a propeller of an ATR 72 (OH-KRC) hit his head.

== Legacy ==
Two aircraft formerly owned by Karair (a Lockheed Model 18 Lodestar and one of the oldest surviving Douglas DC-3s) are currently on display at the Finnish Aviation Museum in Vantaa. Another former Karair DC-3 is exhibited at Munich Airport, though painted in the colors of Swissair.

== Sources ==
- Ismo Tervonen: Veljekset Karhumäki — Suomen ilmailun pioneereina 1924–1956. (Apali 2002) ISBN 952-5026-25-6
- Ismo Tervonen: Kar-Air — tilauslentoliikenteen edelläkävijänä 1957–1980. (Apali 2004) ISBN 952-5026-40-X
- Ismo Tervonen: Karair — matkustajalentoliikenteen perinteiden vaalijana 1980–1996. (Apali 2007) ISBN 978-952-5026-64-1
