= Varkaus Airport =

Varkaus Airport Varkauden lentoasema
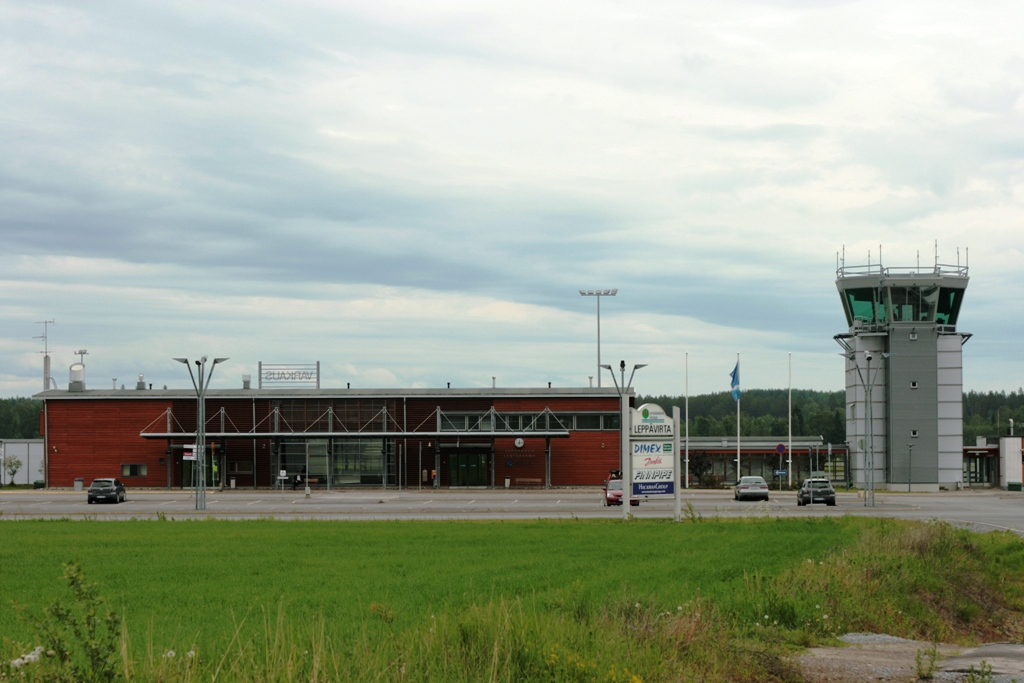
- IATA: VRK; ICAO: EFVR

Summary
- Airport type: Public
- Operator: Finavia
- Serves: Varkaus
- Location: Joroinen, Finland
- Closed: 31 December 2015
- Passenger services ceased: January 2014
- Elevation AMSL: 87 m / 286 ft
- Coordinates: 62°10′16″N 027°52′07″E
- Website: www.finavia.fi/...

Map
- Location within Finland

Runways
Direction	Length		Surface
Direction	m	ft	Surface
14/32	2,000	6,562	Asphalt

Statistics (2015)
- Passengers: 0
- Landings: 0
- Source: AIP Finland; Statistics from Finavia

Varkaus Airport (IATA: VRK, ICAO: EFVR) was an airport in Joroinen, Finland, about 16 kilometres (10 mi) south of Varkaus.

== History ==
The only scheduled service offered by Flybe Nordic to Helsinki ended in January 2014 leaving the airport without any scheduled flights. According to Finavia Varkaus Airport ceased operations on 31 December 2015. The (former) airport code EFVR is no longer referenced in the Finish AIP. Currently the former terminal is used by non-aviation business.

== Statistics ==
Annual passenger statistics for Varkaus Airport
Year	Domestic passengers	International passengers	Total passengers	Change
2005	15,550	519	16,069	−24.0% ▼
2006	11,947	305	12,252	−23.8% ▼
2007	2,337	30	2,367	−80.7% ▼
2008	6,251	151	6,402	+170.5% ▲
2009	9,116	742	9,858	+54.0% ▲
2010	7,601	456	8,057	−18.3% ▼
2011	7,210	1,525	8,735	+8.4% ▲
2012	5,576	1,074	6,650	−23.9% ▼
2013	5,022	1,737	6,759	+1.6% ▲
2014	18	2	20	−99.7% ▼
2015	0	0	0	−100.0% ▼
2016	0	0	0	0%

== See also ==
- List of the largest airports in the Nordic countries
