= Karhumäki brothers =

Finnish airline founder and aircraft manufacturer brothers

The Karhumäki brothers (Finnish: Veljekset Karhumäki), consisting of Niilo (1902–1978) and Valto Karhumäki (1905–1985), were Finnish airline founder and aircraft manufacturer brothers.

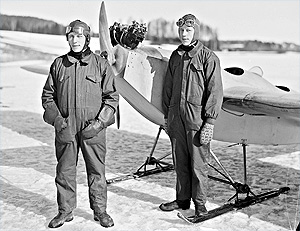
The Karhumäki Brothers in 1927

Born in Multia, Finland in 1902 and 1905, Niilo and Valto Karhumäki moved to Jyväskylä, where they founded a company called Veljekset Karhumäki in late 1924, which dealt with pilot training, public displays, aircraft maintenance and aerial photography during the 1930s. In order to start a co-operation with the Finnish Air Force, the headquarters of Veljekset Karhumäki was moved to Kuorevesi. During World War II the company was merged into the Valtion lentokonetehdas company, manufacturer of a number of military aircraft. The Karhumäki brothers designed the Karhumäki Karhu 48B light airplane, of which a small number was produced during the 1950s.

In 1950, Karhumäki Airways was founded by Veljekset Karhumäki, an airline initially offering scheduled passenger flights on mostly domestic routes. In 1963, Aero O/Y (today's Finnair) acquired the majority of its stake, and in 1996 Karair (as it was known by then) was fully absorbed into Finnair.

The brothers have been honoured with a monument called Lentäjäveljestenaukio (which translates as "Pilot Brothers Square") in Halli.
