= Turku Air =

Turku Air Oy
- Founded: 1974
- Ceased operations: July 6, 2016
- Hubs: Turku Airport
- Fleet size: 12
- Destinations: 3
- Headquarters: Turku, Finland
- Key people: Veikko Tähtinen
- Website: turkuair.fi

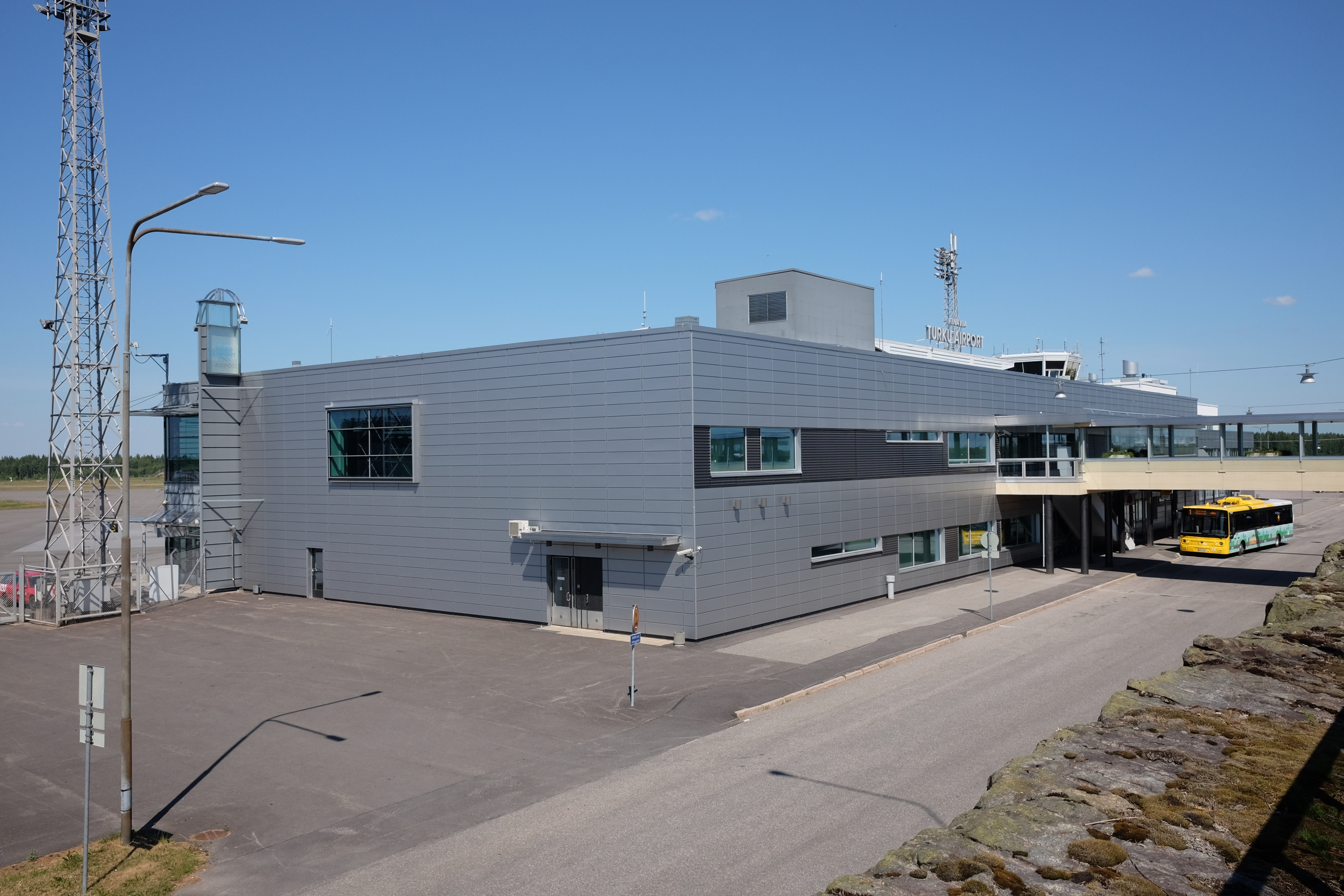
Turku airport terminal

Turku Air was a Finnish regional airline and air taxi company founded 1974. Turku Air had several Piper PA-31-350 airplanes and operated scheduled flights between Turku, Mariehamn and Tallinn as well as chartered cargo and air taxi services.
