= Seinäjoki Airport =

Airport in Ilmajoki, Finland

Seinäjoki Airport Seinäjoen lentoasema
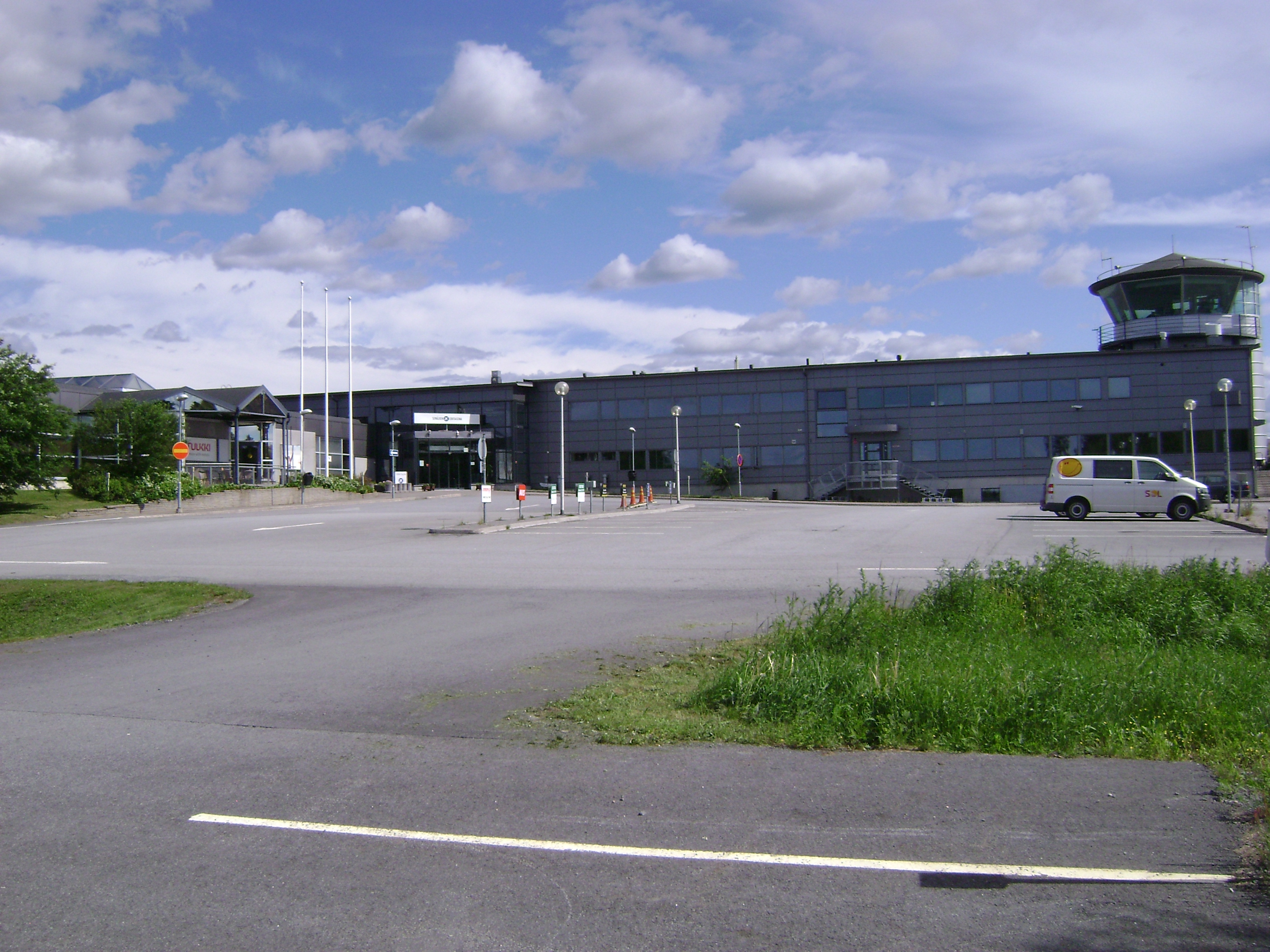
- IATA: SJY; ICAO: EFSI

Summary
- Airport type: Public
- Operator: Rengonharju-säätiö
- Serves: Seinäjoki
- Location: Ilmajoki, Finland
- Elevation AMSL: 92 m (302 ft)
- Coordinates: 62°41′37″N 022°49′55″E
- Website: seinajoenlentoasema.fi

Map
- Location within Finland

Runways
Direction	Length		Surface
Direction	m	ft	Surface
14/32	2,000	6,562	Asphalt

Statistics (2010)
- Passengers: 33,930
- Landings: 1,497
- Source: AIP Finland; Statistics from Finavia

Seinäjoki Airport (Finnish: Seinäjoen lentoasema; IATA: SJY, ICAO: EFSI) is an airport in Ilmajoki, Finland, about 6 NM (11 km; 7 mi) south-southwest of Seinäjoki city centre. The airport has been operated since 2016 by Seinäjoen Lentoasema Oy (Seinäjoki Airport Ltd). Before that (from 1976 to 2016) it was operated by Rengonharju-säätiö (Rengonharju Foundation).

== Facilities ==
The airport resides at an elevation of 92 metres (302 ft) above mean sea level. It has one runway designated 14/32 with an asphalt surface measuring 2,000 by 45 metres (6,562 ft × 148 ft).

== Statistics ==
=== Passengers ===
Annual passenger statistics for Seinäjoki Airport
Year	Domestic passengers	International passengers	Total passengers	Change
2005	35,766	197	35,963	+9.5% ▲
2006	38,858	133	38,991	+8.4% ▲
2007	38,784	164	38,948	−0.1% ▼
2008	37,168	160	37,328	−4.2% ▼
2009	33,840	1,368	35,208	−5.7% ▼
2010	30,603	3,317	33,920	−3.7% ▼

=== Freight and mail ===
Loaded/unloaded freight and mail (tons, kg) at Seinäjoki Airport
Year	Domestic freight	Domestic mail	International freight	International mail	Total freight and mail	Change
2006	11	0	0	0	11	N/A
2007	0.4	0.2	0	0	0.6	−95% ▼
2008	8.6	2.7	0	0	11.3	+1783% ▲
2009	10	1.7	0	0	11.7	+4% ▲
2010	11	2	0	0	13	+11% ▲

== See also ==
- List of airports in Finland
- List of the largest airports in the Nordic countries
