= Karhumäki Karhu 48B =

Karhu 48B
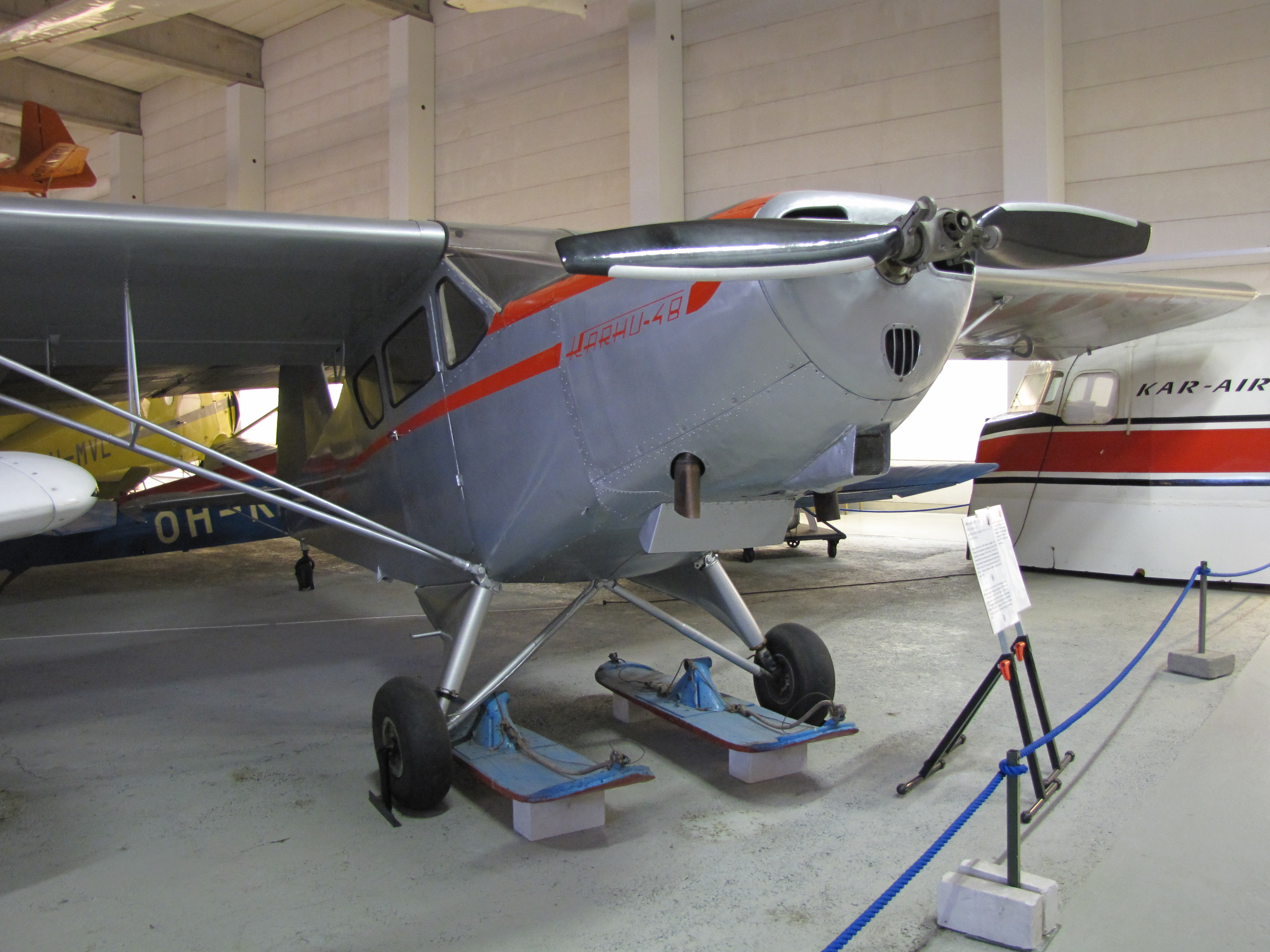
- Karhumäki Karhu 48B in Finnish Aviation Museum

General information
- Type: Light aircraft
- Manufacturer: Veljekset Karhumäki O/Y

History
- First flight: 1948

The Karhumäki Karhu 48B was a Finnish 1950s four-seat monoplane.

== Development ==
The Veljekset Karhumäki O/Y company was formed in 1924 and initially focused on licensed manufacturing. In 1948, the company designed and built a prototype of the Karhu 48, a high-wing four-seat monoplane of mixed construction. It featured a fabric-covered steel-tube fuselage and fabric-covered wooden wings. This was followed up in 1949 by a second prototype, the Karhu 48B. A limited number were built, including several versions equipped with floats.

== Specifications (Karhu 48B) ==
Data from Jane's All The World's Aircraft 1955–56

General characteristics

- Crew: 1
- Capacity: 3 passengers
- Length: 7.85 m (25 ft 9 in) (landplane)
- Wingspan: 11.54 m (37 ft 10 in)
- Wing area: 17.31 m^{2} (186.3 sq ft)
- Empty weight: 813 kg (1,792 lb)
- Max takeoff weight: 1,310 kg (2,888 lb)
- Powerplant: 1 × Avco Lycoming O-435A 6-cyl. air-cooled horizontally-opposed piston engine, 140 kW (190 hp)
- Propellers: 2-bladed Aeromatic 220 variable-pitch

Performance

- Maximum speed: 229 km/h (142 mph, 124 kn)
- Cruise speed: 186 km/h (116 mph, 100 kn)
- Range: 700 km (430 mi, 380 nmi)
- Service ceiling: 4,800 m (15,700 ft)
