= Vaasa Airport =

Vaasa Airport Vaasan lentoasema Vasa flygplats

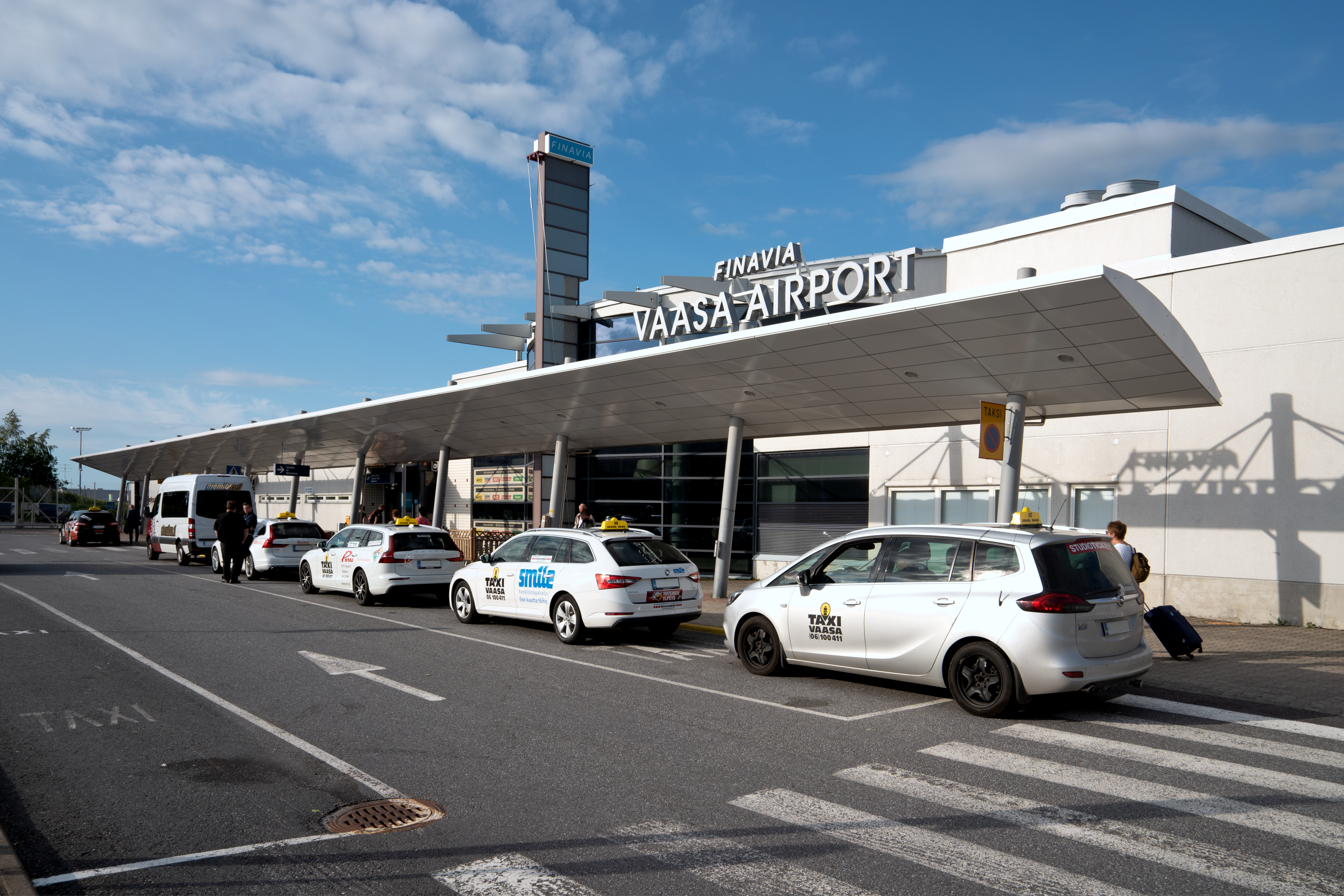
- IATA: VAA; ICAO: EFVA

Summary
- Airport type: Public
- Operator: Finavia
- Location: Vaasa, Finland
- Opened: 1938
- Elevation AMSL: 6 m (20 ft)
- Coordinates: 63°02′43″N 021°45′51″E
- Website: www.finavia.fi/airports/vaasa

Map
- Location within Finland

Runways
Direction	Length		Surface
Direction	m	ft	Surface
16/34	2,500	8,202	Asphalt

Statistics (2024)
- Passengers: 177,592
- Landings: 4,301
- Source: AIP Finland

Vaasa Airport (Finnish: Vaasan lentoasema, Swedish: Vasa flygplats) (IATA: VAA, ICAO: EFVA) is located in Vaasa, Finland, about 9 kilometres (5.6 mi) south-east of Vaasa city centre. As of 2024, it is the 7th busiest airport in Finland with 177,592 passengers.

== History ==
The airport was opened in 1938 when Aero began passenger traffic, which was later interrupted by the war. In 1945 the airport building was completed and passenger routes were reopened.

The airport took its current shape in the 1950s, when the runway was extended to 1,800 metres and the airport building was expanded. In 1951 Vaasa Airport got its first international connection as Veljekset Karhumäki opened a route to Sundsvall in Sweden. In 1971 the runway was extended to 2,000 metres and Finnair began jet traffic with DC-9 aircraft.

In 1993 the third and most significant expansion at the airport was completed, with the airport getting separate facilities for domestic and international traffic and with a significant improvement of the airport's services. In 1998 Vaasa Airport took a step towards more international aviation, as the runway was extended to 2,500 metres in October. In 2014 the terminal's renovation was completed: a new baggage claim hall, security control rearrangement, another café and a new store.

In 2005, 2008, and once again in 2017 Vaasa Airport was chosen as the Airport of the Year in Finland.

The remains of the decommissioned 11/29 1,500m asphalt runway exist towards the south-west of the aerodrome.

In June 2024, Vaasa Airport hosted the Vaasa Airshow, marking 40 years since the previous airshow.

== Airlines and destinations ==
The following airlines operate regular scheduled and charter flights to and from Vaasa:

Airlines	Destinations
Finnair	Helsinki, Umeå
Scandinavian Airlines	Stockholm–Arlanda
Sunclass Airlines	Seasonal charter: Gran Canaria

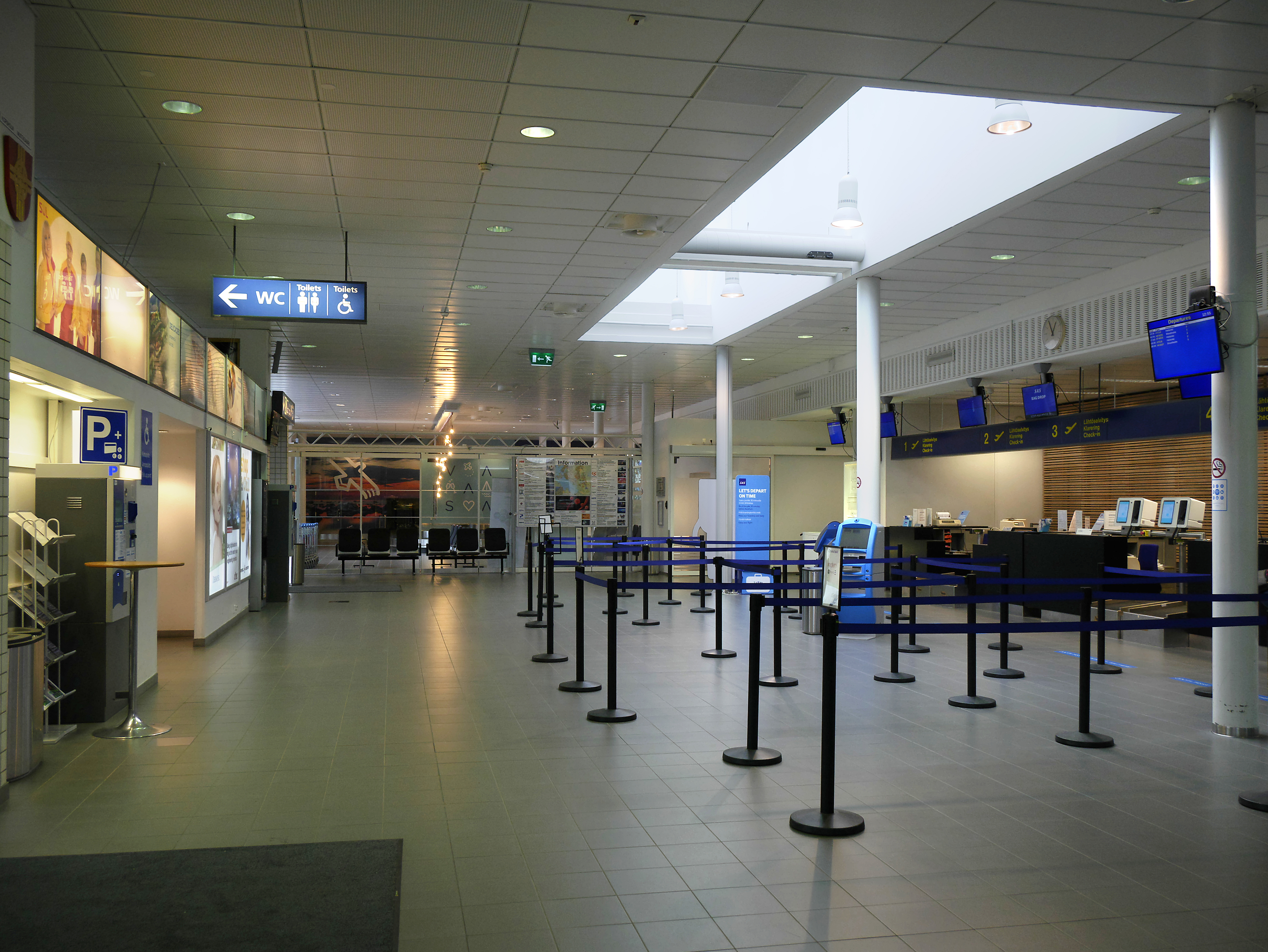
Vaasa Airport check-in area

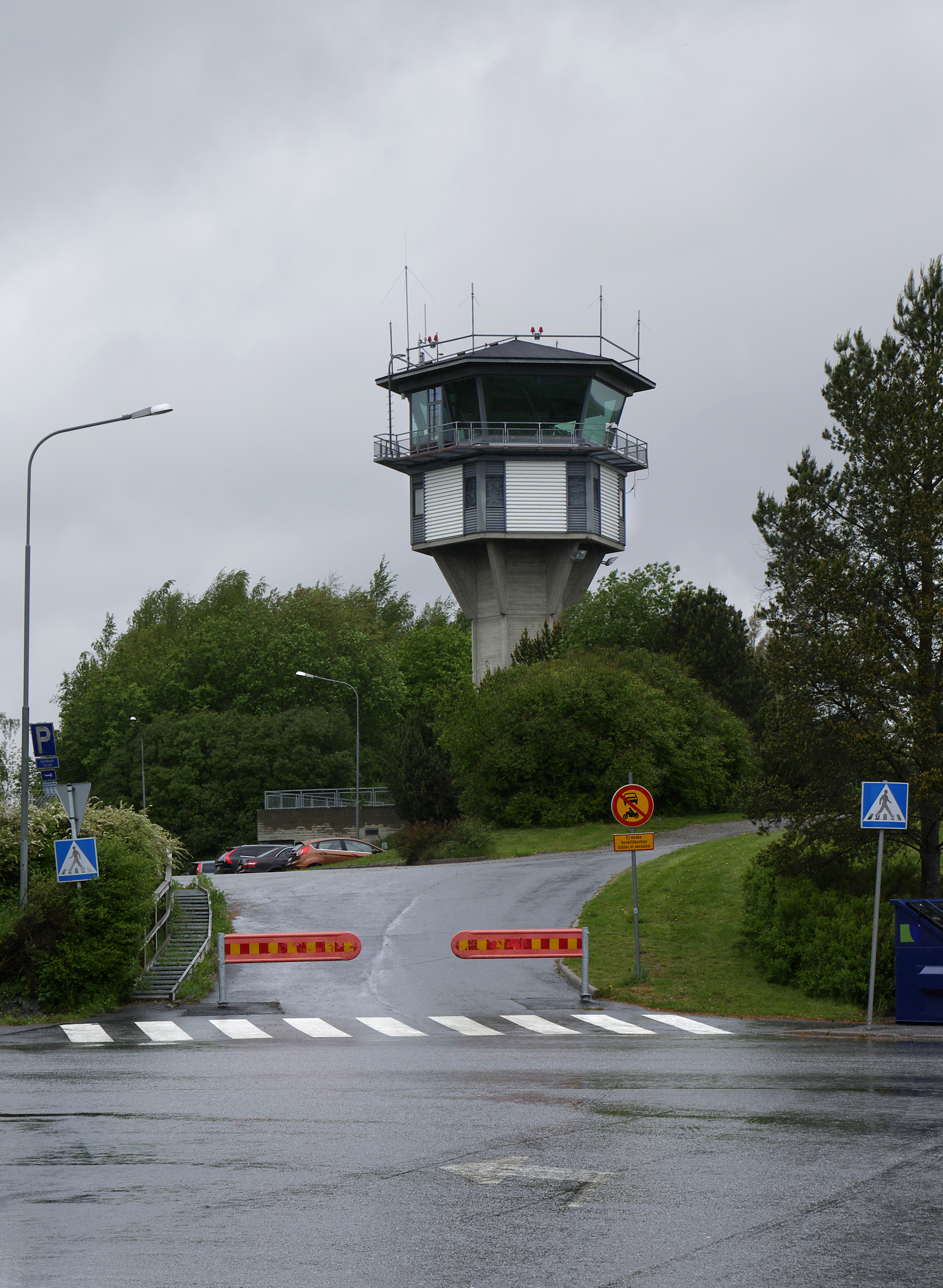
Vaasa Airport traffic control tower

== Statistics ==
Annual passenger statistics for Vaasa Airport
Year	Domestic passengers	International passengers	Total passengers	Change
2000	227,523	98,851	326,374	+4.2% ▲
2001	216,409	95,651	312,060	−4.4% ▼
2002	194,651	74,466	269,117	−13.8% ▼
2003	169,088	79,836	248,924	−7.5% ▼
2004	166,836	94,480	261,316	+5.0% ▲
2005	178,378	118,886	297,264	+13.8% ▲
2006	195,045	111,106	306,151	+3.0% ▲
2007	213,833	108,095	321,928	+5.3% ▲
2008	234,447	108,948	343,395	+6.7% ▲
2009	207,274	86,983	294,257	−14.3% ▼
2010	194,102	94,040	288,142	−2.1% ▼
2011	226,931	111,568	338,499	+18.0% ▲
2012	218,742	155,399	374,141	+10.5% ▲.
2013	185,562	133,753	319,315	-14.7% ▼
2014	184,316	141,570	325,886	+2.1% ▲
2015	162,864	119,573	282,437	-13.3% ▼
2016	173,541	114,979	288,520	+2.2% ▲
2017	162,333	137,785	300,118	+4.0% ▲
2018	166,195	149,705	315,900	+5.3% ▲
2019	165,125	138,786	303,911	-3.8% ▼
2020	35,303	24,409	59,712	-80.4% ▼
2021	16,648	2,583	19,231	-67.8% ▼
2022	89,532	23,712	113,244	+488.9% ▲
2023	103,306	50,475	153,781	+35.8% ▲
2024	99,389	78,203	177,592	+15.5% ▲
2025	102,459	66,972	169,431	-4.6% ▼

== Ground transportation ==
Means of transport at Vaasa Airport
Means of transport	Operator	Routes	Destinations	Website	Notes
Bus	Lifti	4, 44	4: to Gerby via Market Square (Finnish: Kauppatori, Swedish: Salutorget) 44: to the Market Square via Melaniemi (Finnish: Kauppatori, Swedish: Salutorget)	www.vaasa.fi	At least every hour on weekdays between 6:00 and 21:00
Taxi	Taksi Vaasa-Vasa	Taxi	Vaasa	www.taksivaasa.fi	

== See also ==
- List of the largest airports in the Nordic countries
