= Finnish Competition and Consumer Authority =

Finnish consumer rights protection agency

- Finnish: Kilpailu- ja kuluttajavirasto Swedish: Konkurrens- och konsumentverket

Agency overview
- Formed: January 1, 2013
- Preceding agencies: Finnish Consumer Agency; Finnish Competition Authority
- Jurisdiction: Finland
- Agency executive: Kirsi Leivo, Director General
- Website: www.kkv.fi

The Finnish Competition and Consumer Authority (Finnish: Kilpailu- ja kuluttajavirasto, Swedish: Konkurrens- och konsumentverket) is the Competition regulator in Finland. It is the regulatory authority of Politics of Finland which works in the field of competition and consumer rights protection. The purpose of the Finnish Competition and Consumer Authority (the FCCA) is to create healthy and effective markets in which companies and other operators act responsibly and in keeping with consumers' interests.

The FCCA functions according to the following acts:

- Act on the Finnish Competition and Consumer Authority (661/2012):
- Competition Act (948/2011)

== Legislative development ==
The FCCA was established as a result of the merger of the Finnish Consumer Agency and the Finnish Competition Authority.

=== The Finnish Consumer Agency ===
The first consumer council was formed in 1965. Since 1974, the consumer co-ordination council had been part of the Ministry of Trade and Industry (currently the Ministry of Employment and Economy). One result of this Council is the establishment of the Finnish Consumer Agency. However, its roots may be found in 1957, when the Social Democratic Women's Association established a Home Counselling Alliance. The women's organizations and representatives of the household for both co-operative movements were active representatives of these governmental consumer bodies. Consequently, stakeholders and pressure groups from women's organizations and consumer co-operatives addressed the empowerment of consumers.

=== The Finnish Competition Authority ===
The Finnish Competition Authority was established in 1988 and it used to operate under the Ministry of Trade and Industry. Its aim was to protect sound and effective economic competition and to increase economic efficienсy by promoting competition and abolishing competition restraints.

=== The merger of the Finnish Consumer Agency and the Finnish Competition Authority ===
Now both aforementioned agencies have been working together as the FCCA since 1 January 2013. With all functional differences between competition and consumer policies, both divisions aim to maintain the market order that consumers trust, and that creates incentives for economic growth.

During the preliminary study that preceded the submission of the legislative proposal regarding the merger, several grounds for the merger were put forward in addition to the explicit savings targets in respect of support functions and the costs of premises. There are some reasons for the merge:

1. the functions of the agencies are connected with the markets, and there were also similarities in the agencies’ objectives;
2. the need to increase and use cross-sector specific expertise;
3. the need to develop the research function;
4. the aim to increase the social weight and influence of competition and consumer affairs and to make their administration more effective.

== Organizational structure ==
The FCCA consists of two main Divisions: the Competition Division and the Consumer Division. The FCCA is led by the Director General Kirsi Leivo. The European Consumer Centre Finland is part of the Finnish Competition and Consumer Authority (FCCA).

=== The Competition Division ===
The departments which operate under competition affairs:

- Enforcement 1, headed by Assistant Director Maarit Taurula
- Enforcement 2, headed by Assistant Director Valtteri Virtanen
- Enforcement 3, headed by Assistant Director Sanna Syrjälä
- Advocacy Unit, headed by Assistant Director Arttu Juuti
- International Affairs, headed by Assistant Director Rainer Lindberg

=== The Consumer Division ===
The following departments and functions deal with consumer affairs:

- Consumer Protection 1, headed by Assistant Director Miina Ojajärvi
- Consumer Protection 2, headed by Assistant Director Outi Haunio-Rudanko
- Consumer Protection 3, headed by Assistant Director Päivi Seppälä
- Advisory services, headed by Director Maija Puomila

Moreover, the following departments operate directly under the Director General:

- Market Research, Research Director Martti Virtanen
- Communication, Director Laura Salmi
- Administration, Head of Administration Anna Saharinen

== Responsibilities ==
The two most important functions of the FCCA are supervision of compliance with legislation regarding public procurement and the merger control.

=== Public procurement ===
The new Act on Procurement and Concession Contracts (1397/2016) gave the FCCA the authority to monitor compliance with the legislation on public procurement from the beginning of 2017. The Act on Public Contracts in Special Sectors covers procurements by contracting entities operating in the water, energy, transport and postal service. The Defence and Security Procurements Act is applicable to defence and security procurements. ln addition, the Act on Public Contracts contains sector-specific rules оп social and health services, and certain other service procurements. As а Member State от the European Union, Finland is subject to the applicable EU legislation on public procurement. Finland has implemented the latest EU directives on public procurement, i.e. Directive 2014/24/EU on public procurement, Directive 2014/25/EU on procurement by entities operating in the water, energy, transport and postal services sectors and Directive 2014/23/EU on the award of concession contracts.

The objective of procurement supervision is to ensure the implementation of the key principles of procurement legislation, such as openness and non-discrimination, in procurement. In the supervision of procurement, the FCCA's focus is primarily on the monitoring of illegal direct procurement and other corresponding procurements conducted in a blatantly erroneous or discriminatory manner. According to the Act on Procurement and Concession Contracts, the FCCA must draw up an annual report on its supervision of public procurements. The report on the first year of procurement supervision includes a summary of illegal activities observed by the FCCA during its procurement supervision operations, and of the measures referred to in the Act on Public Contracts.

It is important to mention that anyone who considers that a contracting entity has contravened the procurement legislation may submit a request to the FCCA for measures to investigate the legality of the procedure. Damages claims can be sought in civil proceedings.

=== Merger control ===
In the field of the merger control the FCCA gives its permission to the deals concerning economic concentration. For example, the FCCA has approved the acquisition of Onninen Oy by Kesko Corporation, the sale of Stockmann Delicatessen in Finland to S Group's three regional cooperatives and SOK.

=== Measures and available resources ===
The Consumer Ombudsman selects a measure enabling the best possible effectiveness to be achieved in light of the situation with the resources available. Options include, for example:

- Provision of information to the company or entire sector;
- Consumer education;
- Cooperation with and lobbying of the industry organisation to change the practices of companies;
- Request for clarification sent to the individual company in question;
- Request for commitment from the company;
- Prohibition;
- Petition to the Market Court;
- Consumer assistance in court;
- Collective complaint;
- Class action.

== International cooperation ==
The FCCA annually works on approximately 600 international cooperation issues, and participates in the activities of roughly 50 international working groups involving competition policy. The FCCA's most important international cooperation partners in competition affairs include the ECN (European Competition Network) which includes the national competition authorities of the EU Member States. The FCCA also has close ties to the national competition authorities in other Nordic countries. Furthermore, the FCCA is an active participant in the OECD's (Organization for Economic Cooperation and Development), ICN's (International Competition Network) and the ECA's (European Competition Authorities) international cooperation on competition-related affairs. The Finnish Competition and Consumer Authority (FCCA), earlier The Finnish Consumer Agency & Ombudsman, has been a member of the European Consumer Organisation (BEUC) since 1993.

The FCCA develops relations with the agencies of other countries. For example, the FCCA cooperates with the Russian Federal Antimonopoly Service (the FAS). The cooperation is shown in such directions as

- The exchange of legal and other normative documents as well as information exchange;
- the organization of meetings of the Heads of Authorities;
- in the field of organization of traineeships for the Parties’ representatives and organizing symposiums, conferences and seminars.
