= Nordic Regional Airlines =

Regional airline of Finland

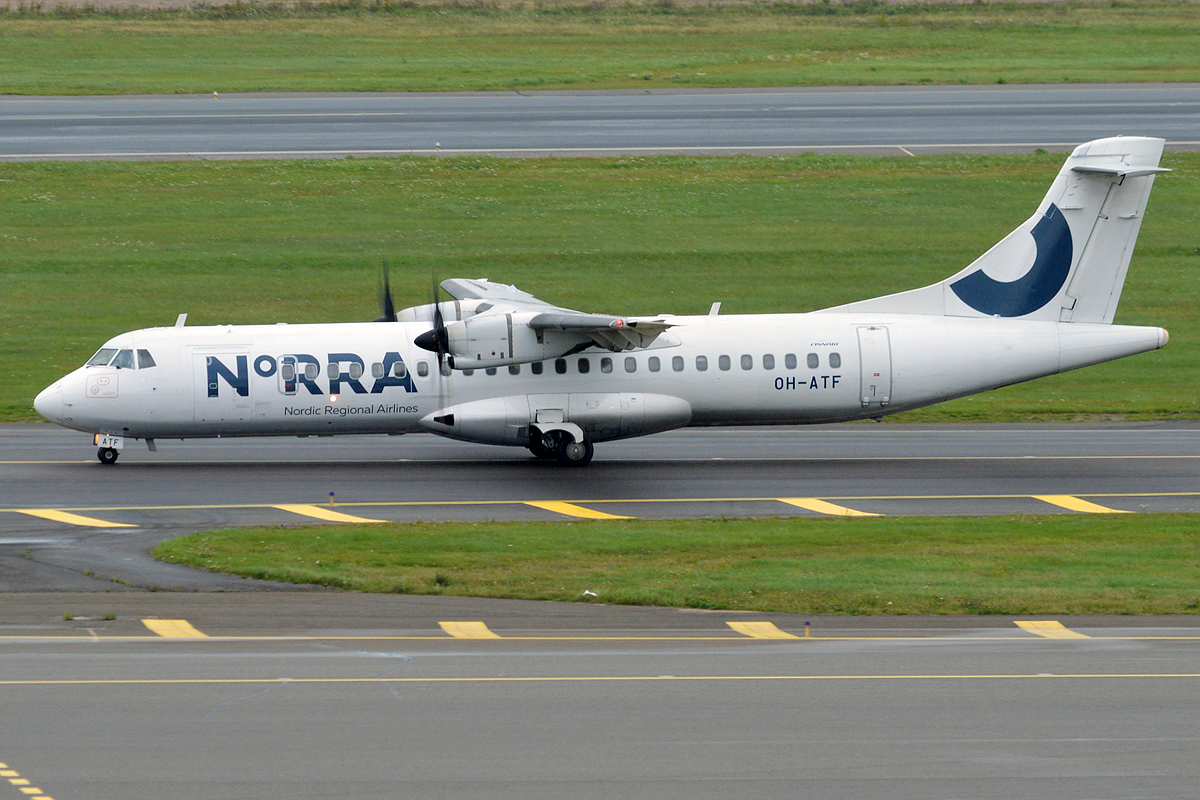
- ATR 72-500
IATA	ICAO	Call sign
N7	FCM	FINNCOMM
- Founded: 2011 (as Flybe Nordic)
- Commenced operations: 1 May 2015 (as Nordic Regional Airlines)
- Hubs: Helsinki Airport
- Frequent-flyer program: Finnair Plus
- Alliance: Oneworld (affiliate)
- Fleet size: 24
- Destinations: 35
- Parent company: Danish Air Transport (60%); Finnair (40%)
- Headquarters: Vantaa, Finland
- Employees: c. 650
- Website: www.flynorra.com

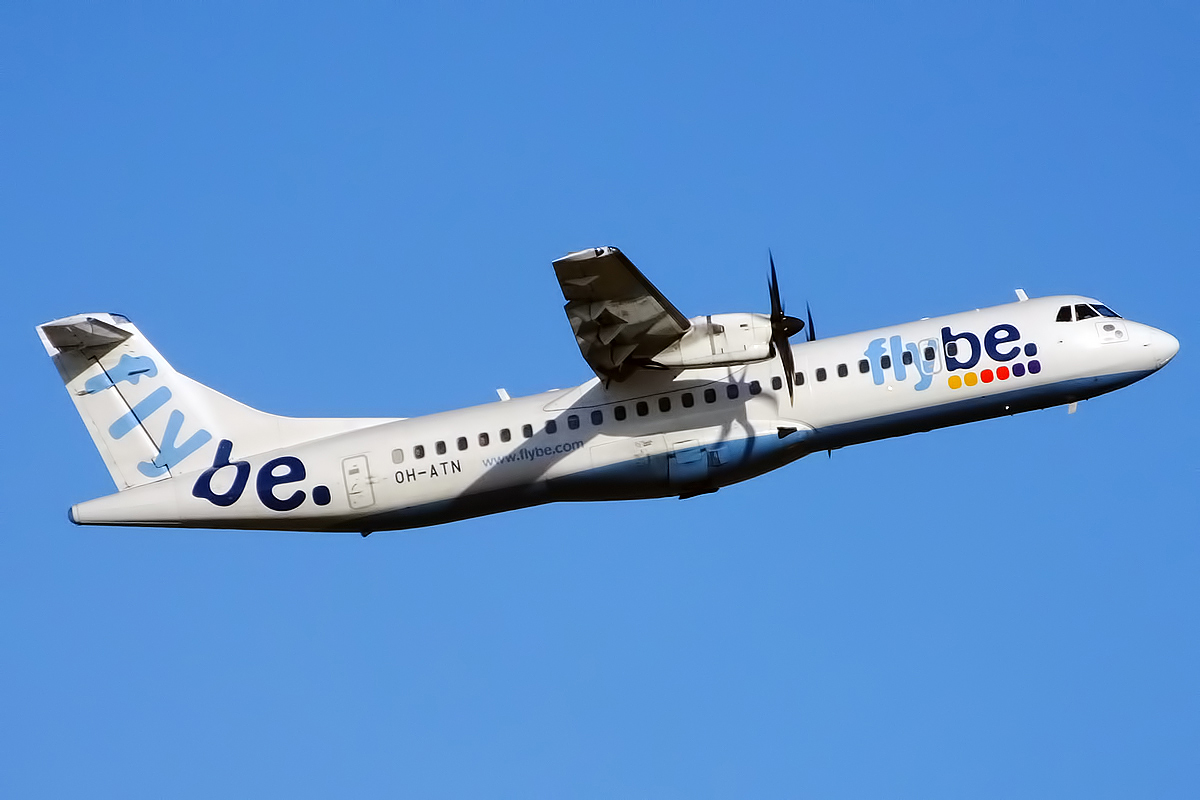
ATR 72-500 in former Flybe Nordic livery

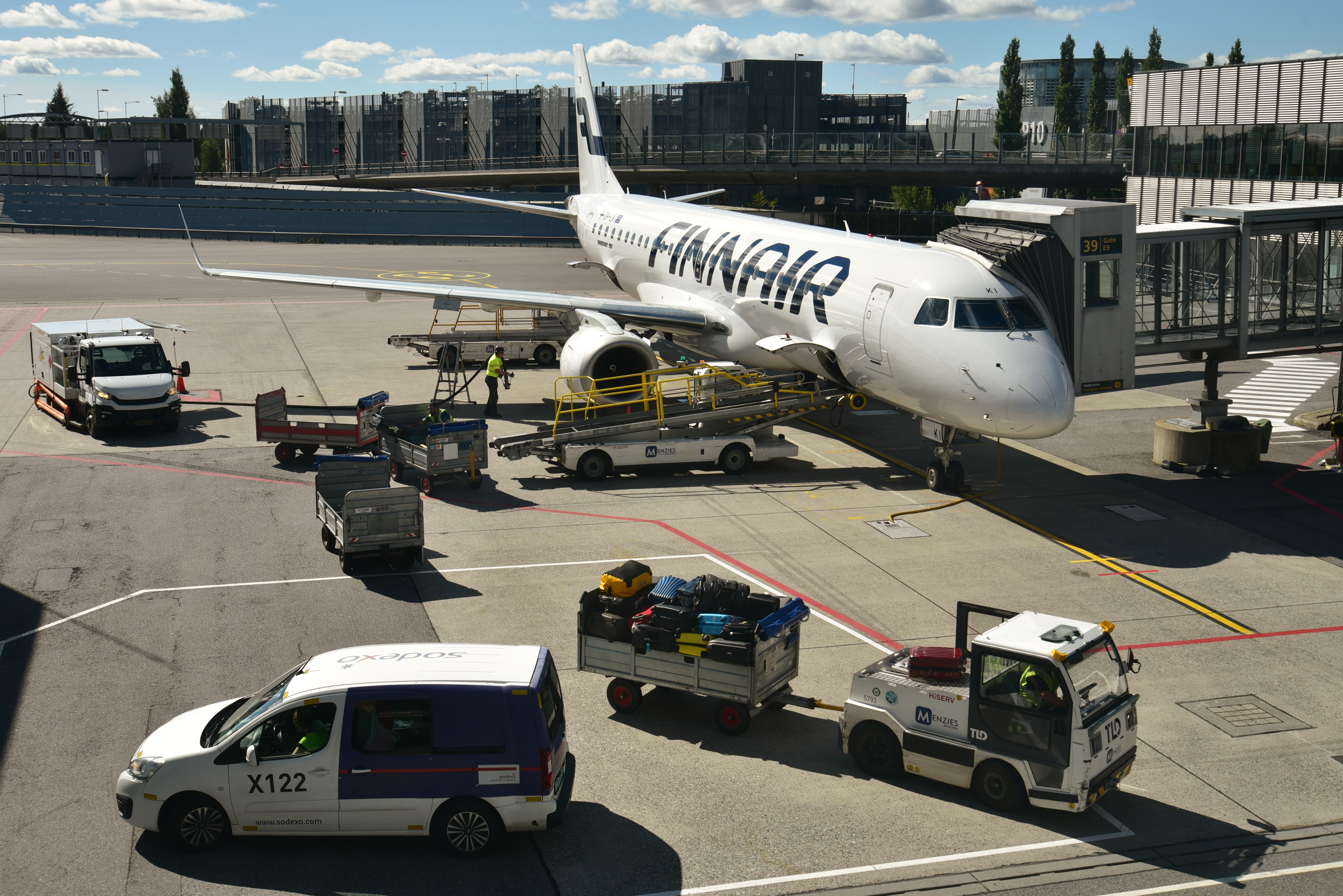
Embraer E190LR operated on behalf of Finnair

Nordic Regional Airlines Oy, abbreviated as NORRA and often stylised N°RRA, for a few years Flybe Nordic,) is a regional airline based at Helsinki Airport. NORRA is a joint venture set up by Finnair, Finland's flag carrier, and Danish Air Transport.

The company's head office and operations centre is located in Vantaa, Finland, while the office in Seinäjoki houses the company's financial division.

== History ==
=== The beginning ===
Finnish Commuter Airlines was established in 1993 and started flying on irregular basis in the second half of that decade. Cooperation with Finnair started in 1998 when staff, flight planning, operations control and marketing functions were provided to Swedish regional airline Golden Air Flyg. The first schedules were started in 2003, all of them on behalf of Finnair and Golden Air Flyg, using Finncomm Airlines brand. The fleet was made up by a single leased Embraer E145 which was soon joined by another one and also by two Saab 340s. Traffic grew and in 2005 the fleet also included the first ATR 42. By June 2007, through a code-sharing agreement with Finnair, the network had expanded to 15 domestic routes and 4 international ones. In early 2011 larger ATR 72s had been added to the fleet.

=== New owners and new name ===
The creation of a new airline was announced on 1 July 2011, when British European Airways (Flybe (1979–2020)) and Finnair revealed plans to jointly purchase Finnish Commuter Airlines and rebrand it Flybe Nordic, with British European Airways and Finnair each holding a stake in the new airline. Under the terms of the agreement, the purchase price of Finncomm was €25 million, of which Flybe would pay €12 million and Finnair €13 million. British European Airways had a majority stake (60%) in Flybe Nordic, with Finnair holding the remaining 40%; Flybe had three seats in the airline's board of directors with Finnair having the other two. Flybe planned to invest a total of €23.6 million into the new airline, including expenses such as loan repayments in addition to the purchase price of FCA.

At the time of the announcement of Flybe Nordic's creation, British European Airways planned to begin operating the new airline on 1 August 2011, with the old name being phased out, though the start date was later pushed back to 30 October. A new route network was also planned to be announced in mid August.

=== Temporary Finnish ownership ===
In November 2014, British European Airways announced that it would sell its 60% stake in the airline for €1 in an effort to reduce group costs. In February 2015, the Finnish Competition and Consumer Authority approved the sale of the stake (60%) to StaffPoint Holding and G.W. Sohlberg. The 60% share was sold to Finnair as a temporary solution in March 2015. The airline has operated under Finnair's flight codes since 1 May 2015, and was renamed NORRA-Nordic Regional Airlines on 15 June.

In 2018 Danish Air Transport became the major shareholder.

== Destinations ==
=== Codeshare agreements ===
As of November 2014, the airline has codeshare agreements with the following airlines:

- Air France
- British Airways
- Etihad Airways
- Finnair
- KLM

== Subsidiaries ==
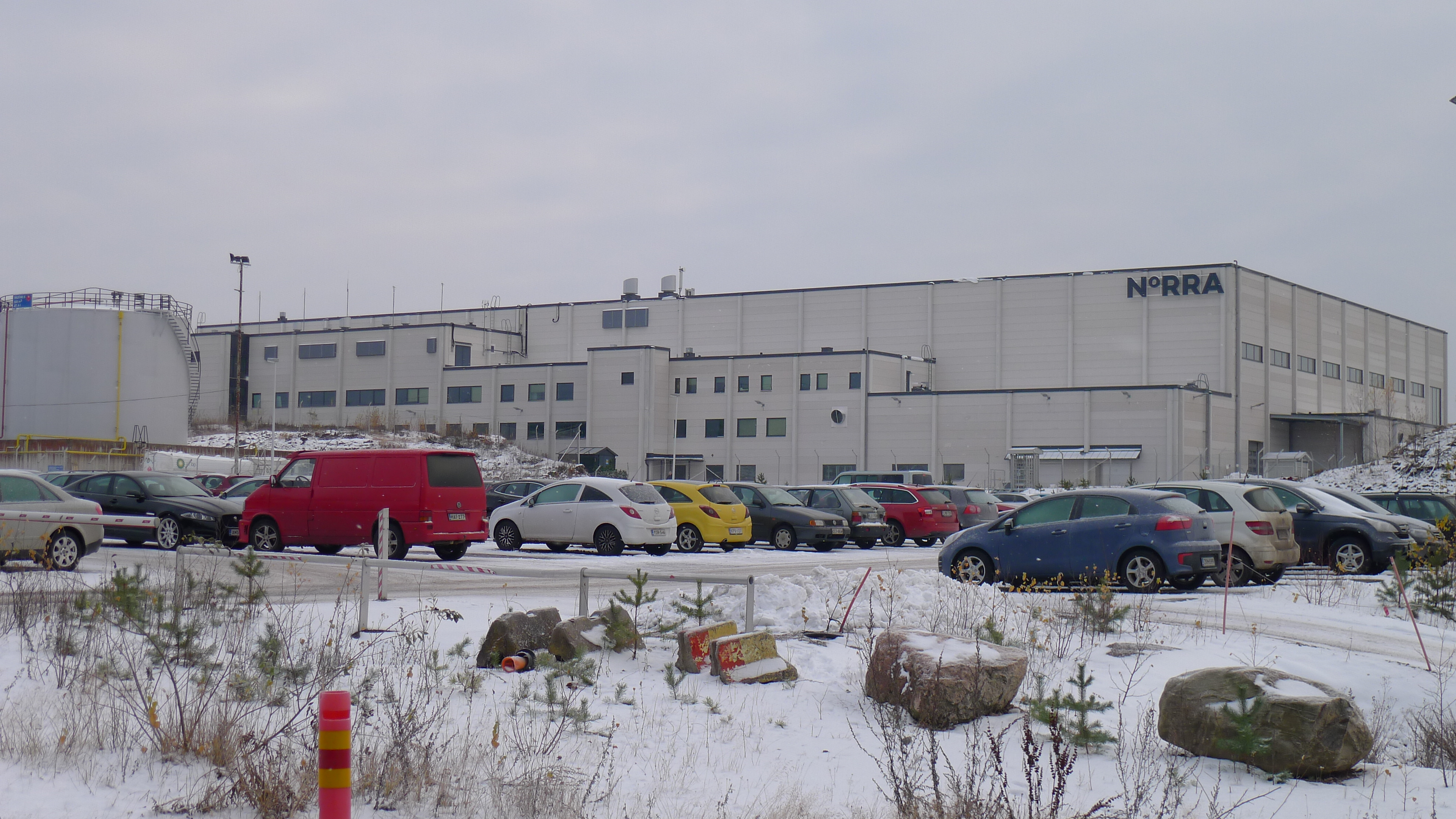
Headquarters in Vantaa

=== Flybe Finland Ground ===
In April 2013, it was announced that Flybe Finland Ground will be established to provide ground services to Flybe operations in Finland. This business will initially focus on Helsinki Airport where it will develop services to support Flybe's own operations. In the future, Flybe Finland Ground will also offer ground services to other airlines in Finland and overseas.

=== Flybe Finland Maintenance ===
The former Finnish Aircraft Maintenance has operated as Flybe Finland Maintenance since April 2013. It provides maintenance services for regional aircraft, in particular ATR 72 aircraft at Helsinki Airport.

== Fleet ==
=== Current fleet ===
As of July 2026, Nordic Regional Airlines operates the following aircraft:

Aircraft	In service	Orders	Passengers	Notes
ATR 72-500	12	2	68	Leased from Finnair. Orders to be provided as leasing.
ATR 72-500	12	2	70	Leased from Finnair. Orders to be provided as leasing.
Embraer E190LR	12	2	100	Operated for Finnair. Orders to be provided as leasing.
Embraer E195-E2	—	18	134	Further options for 16 aircraft and purchase rights for 12 aircraft.
Total	24	22		

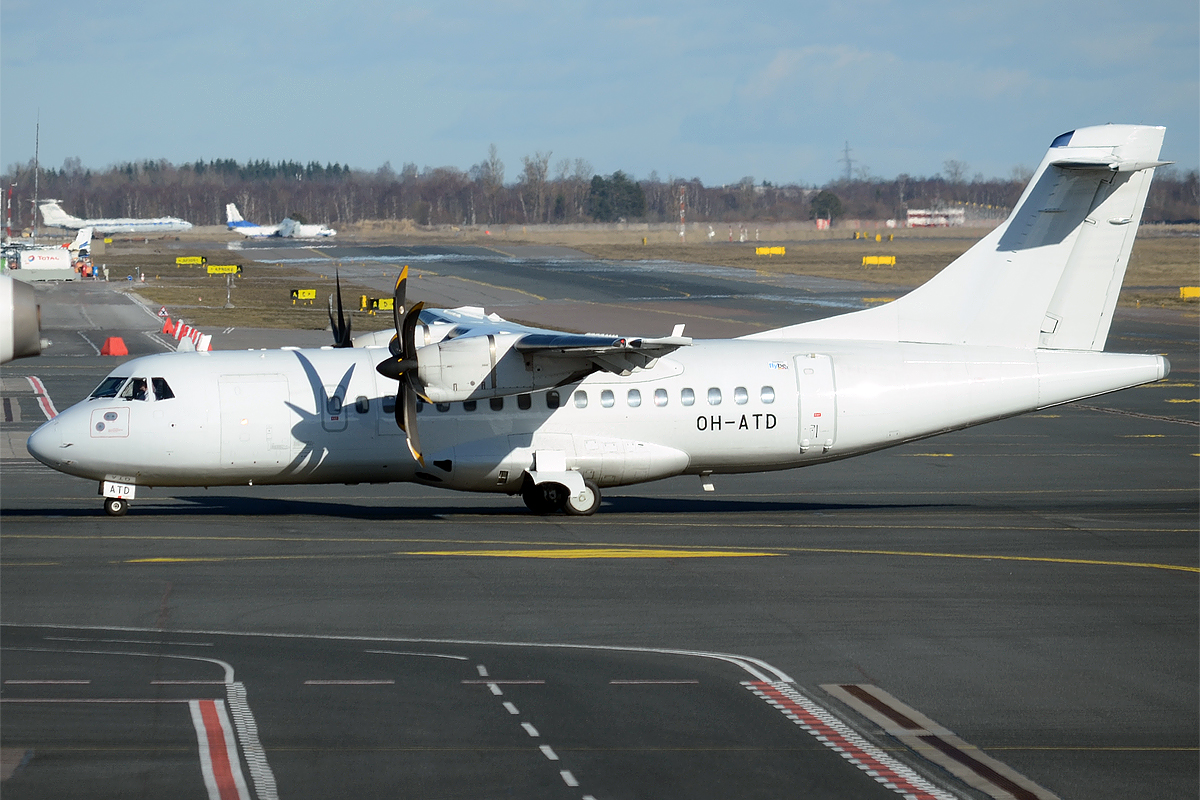
A retired ATR 42-500

=== Former fleet ===
As of August 2025, Nordic Regional Airlines operated 12 ATR 72-500 and 12 Embraer 190.

Aircraft	Introduced	Retired
ATR 42-500	2005	2014
Embraer E170	2005	2016
