= TEAM Linhas Aéreas =

Domestic airline based in Brazil

TEAM Linhas Aéreas Ltda.
IATA	ICAO	Call sign
–	TIM	TEAM BRASIL
- Founded: 2001
- Ceased operations: 2012
- Operating bases: Rio de Janeiro-Santos Dumont
- Headquarters: Rio de Janeiro, Brazil
- Key people: Mário César Soares Moreira (President)
- Website: www.voeteam.com.br

TEAM Linhas Aéreas Ltda. (Transportes Especiais Aéreos e Malotes) was a domestic airline based in Rio de Janeiro, Brazil, founded in 2001. On April 16, 2012, the airline had its operational license suspended and on October 3, 2014, the license was revoked.

== History ==
The company's main objective was to operate in the market of scheduled regional flights, connecting the city of Rio de Janeiro to other cities within Rio de Janeiro State and neighboring states.

Created in May 2001 as a charter company to render services for oil companies in the Campos Basin, TEAM began to operate as a scheduled airline in the same year between the airports of Santos Dumont Airport (Rio de Janeiro), and Macaé and Campos dos Goytacazes.

In May 2010, TEAM was named by the Czech aircraft manufacturer Let Aircraft Industries its general sales agent for Brazil. TEAM is also specialized in the maintenance of their aircraft, the Let L-410 Turbolet.

After being grounded in February 2011, TEAM resumed scheduled services in March 2011. However, in April 2011, the airline was once again grounded and services resumed only in July 2011. On April 16, 2012, the National Civil Aviation Agency of Brazil suspended its operational license. and on October 3, 2014, it was revoked.

== Destinations ==
TEAM Linhas Aéreas operated services to the following destinations:

- Campos dos Goytacazes – Bartolomeu Lysandro Airport
- Macaé – Macaé Airport
- Rio de Janeiro – Santos Dumont Airport
- Vitória, Espírito Santo – Eurico de Aguiar Salles Airport

== Fleet ==
In December 2011, the fleet of Team Linhas Aéreas included the following aircraft:

TEAM Linhas Aéreas fleet
Aircraft	Total	Years of operation	Notes
Let L-410 Turbolet	3	2001-2012	

== Airline affinity program ==
TEAM Linhas Aéreas had no frequent-flyer program.

== Accidents and incidents ==
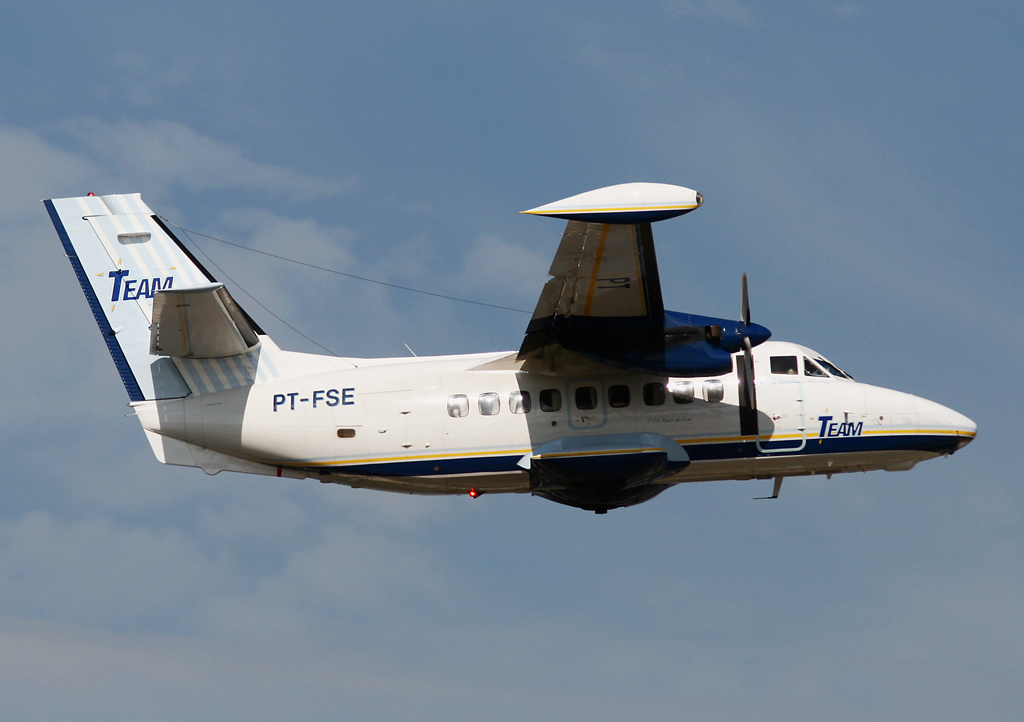
Let L-410 Turbolet UVP-E20 PT-FSE

- 31 March 2006: a Let 410 UVP-E20, registration PT-FSE, operating Flight 6865 en route from Macaé to Rio de Janeiro-Santos Dumont, crashed over the Municipality of Rio Bonito. Trying to avoid an area of poor weather, the aircraft struck trees near the top of Pico da Pedra Bonita at an elevation of 1,920 feet. All 19 passengers and crew died.

== See also ==
- List of defunct airlines of Brazil
