= TEAM Linhas Aéreas Flight 6865 =

2006 aviation accident

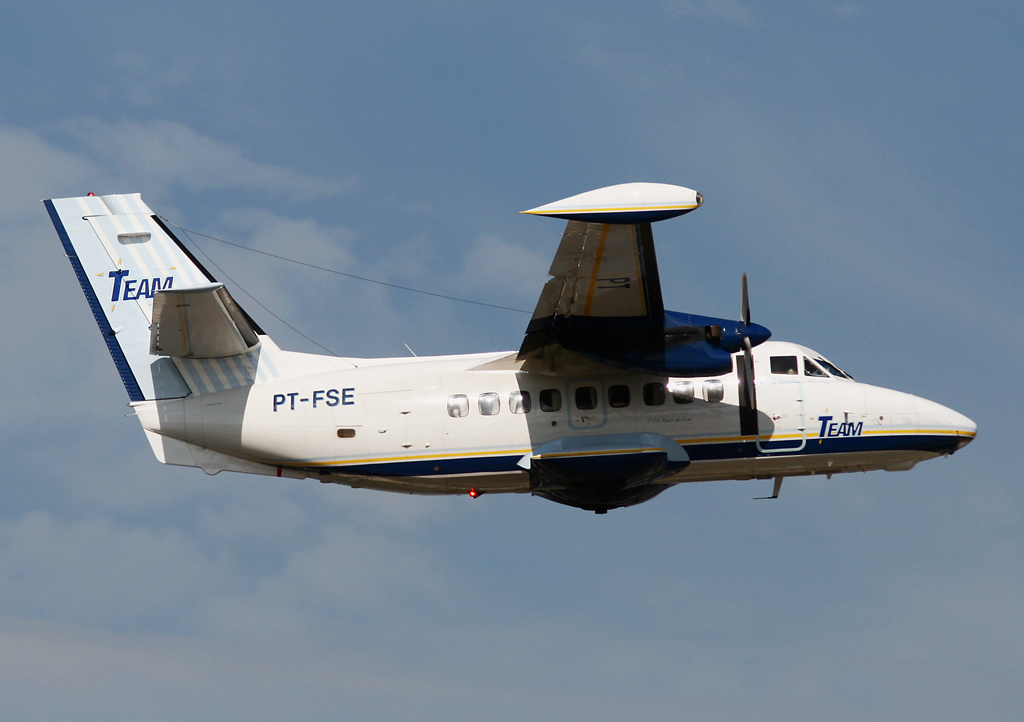
- PT-FSE, the aircraft involved in the accident, pictured in February 2006

Accident
- Date: 31 March 2006
- Summary: Controlled flight into terrain
- Site: Pico da Pedra Bonita, Rio Bonito, Brazil; 20°31′S 42°20′W

Aircraft
- Aircraft type: Let L-410 Turbolet
- Operator: TEAM Linhas Aéreas
- Registration: PT-FSE
- Flight origin: Macaé Airport, Macaé, Brazil
- Destination: Santos Dumont Airport, Rio de Janeiro, Brazil
- Passengers: 17
- Crew: 2
- Fatalities: 19
- Survivors: 0

TEAM Linhas Aéreas Flight 6865 (TIM6865) was a short-haul domestic passenger service between Macaé and Rio de Janeiro that flew into a mountain on 31 March 2006. The aircraft, a Let L-410 Turbolet, was conducting a VFR approach to Macaé Airport with 17 passengers and 2 crew on board when it hit the top of Pico da Pedra Bonita in Brazil. All 19 people on board were killed in the crash. Brazilian investigative team CENIPA concluded that the VFR approach was inadequate, stating that the visibility at the time was not good enough for a VFR approach.

== Flight ==
TEAM Linhas Aéreas Flight 6865 was operated by TEAM Linhas Aéreas, a domestic airline based in Rio de Janeiro. It was a daily scheduled domestic flight from Macaé in the Brazilian state of Rio de Janeiro to the city of the same name. The Let L-410 bore the Brazilian registration of PT-FSE and was carrying 19 people, consisting of 2 crew and 17 passengers.

The flight took off from Macaé at 17:19 local time. At the time, it was operating under instrument flight rules (IFR) with an estimated time of arrival at 18:02. After taking off from Macaé, the crew stated their intention to cancel their IFR flight plan and added that they wanted to continue the flight under visual flight rules (VFR). This cancellation was approved by an air traffic controller.

As bad weather approached, the crew descended to 2,000 ft. The crew had banked the aircraft to the left when it struck tree tops and slammed into the top of Pico da Pedra Bonita, near the municipality of Rio Bonito. The impact killed everyone on board.

== Investigation ==
CENIPA conducted a 12-month-long investigation into the accident. The final report was released on 19 March 2007, concluding that the crash was categorized as a controlled flight into terrain caused by pilot error. At the time, weather in the area was poor, and the crew intentionally changed from IFR to VFR while the visibility was limited. Additionally, prior to the flight, the crew was not aware about the weather conditions in the area. CENIPA also blamed the crew's poor decision-making, stating that they were not properly trained, which caused them to fly at a lower altitude than a safe limit.
