= Flughafen Zürich AG =

Public company

Zurich Airport Ltd.
- Company type: Public corporation (Aktiengesellschaft)
- Traded as: SIX: FHZN; SMI MID component
- ISIN: CH0319416936
- Industry: Airport operator
- Founded: April 1, 2000; 25 years ago
- Headquarters: Kloten, canton of Zürich, Switzerland
- Key people: Lukas Brosi (CEO), Josef Felber (Chairman)
- Owner: Canton of Zürich (1/3 of all shares by law)
- Number of employees: 2,721 (2025)
- Website: flughafen-zuerich.ch

Flughafen Zürich AG (FZAG), based in Kloten, Switzerland, is the owner and operator of Zurich Airport. It owns, co-owns and runs airports in India, Brazil, Chile, Colombia and Curaçao. The mixed-economy stock company was established in April 2000 and is listed on the SIX Swiss Exchange; the largest individual shareholder is the canton of Zürich, which must hold at least one third of the share capital at all times.

== History ==
Zurich Airport AG was founded to what it is today on 1 April 2000, through the fusion of the airport real estate company (Flughafen-Immobilien-Gesellschaft FIG) and the Zürich airport directorate (Flughafendirektion Zürich FDZ).

The airport real estate company FIG, whose roots date back to November 1948, was lastly a stock company (since 1984) based in Kloten, and was responsible for the construction and operation of buildings at the airport. Significant shareholders of the FIG were the Canton of Zürich (23 percent) and the city of Zürich (18 percent).

The Zürich Airport Directorate was affiliated to the Cantonal Economics Directorate and the formal owner of the airport as a whole. Its responsibilities included the construction and operation of the civil engineering works (slopes, taxiways), the airport operation, the negotiation and implementation of the company regulations and the political representation of the airport.

The privatization of the FIG and the steady growth of the airport led to the political advance of Zürich Airport becoming independent and the FDZ was removed from the cantonal administration and merged with the FIG. A new airport act was drafted on the initiative and approved by the Cantonal Council with 60 percent yes votes on 12 July 1999. The airport act was submitted to the Zürich voters for approval on 28 November and accepted by them with 61 per cent of votes.

This created the basis for the new company, and the new Airport Act came into effect on 1 March 2000. Based on three merger agreements between the FIG and the Canton of Zürich, an increase in the share capital from originally 70 million (140,000 registered shares of 500 Swiss francs) to a new 245'615,000 Swiss francs (4'912'300 registered shares of 50 Swiss francs) was made, and the FDZ was integrated into the FIG, which commenced operations on 1 April as Flughafen Zürich AG (FZAG).

From its founding until April 2010, FZAG was nicknamed Unique, while in official publications the name Unique (Flughafen Zürich AG) was used; the Unique brand is now only used for activities abroad. Since 12 April 2000, the company has been listed on the SWX; the Canton of Zürich had 78.1 percent of the share capital of the company on the first day, as a result of the restructuring. The shares were continuously reduced, but the share of FZAG in this first stage of privatization was not allowed to fall below a 50 per cent share as the operating license was issued until 1 June 2001 in the Canton of Zürich. After the operating concession had been transferred to FZAG, the canton was able to reduce its share to a prescribed minimum of 33.33 percent. The concession to operate Zürich Airport, issued by the Swiss Federal Department of Environment, Transport, Energy and Communications on 31 May 2001, has a term of 50 years, from 1 June 2001 to 31 May 2051.

In December 2001, FZAG founded the subsidiary Unique Airports Worldwide AG, which allows them to operate and participate in airports all over the world.

== Investments ==
Through the company A-port Operaciones S.A., Chile, the company holds a majority in the management and operation of certain airports in Latin America. These include the three regional airports Florianópolis-Hercílio Luz International Airport, Puerto Montt, Iquique and Antofagasta, as well as other airports in Colombia and in Curaçao with a minority shareholding.

The participation in the Santiago Mariño Caribbean International Airport in Venezuela was expropriated by the state in 2010. An arbitration court was therefore called upon and decided that the State of Venezuela had to pay USD 14.2 million by the end of 2014, half of which is attributable to Flughafen Zürich AG In India, Unique held 17 percent of the equity capital of Bangalore International Airport Ltd. (BIAL) during the construction phase, and was the owner and operator of the newly opened Bangalore airport in 2008; the share holdings were reduced to 5 per cent in 2009, and they are to be sold in 2017. On 29 November 2019, they were awarded a contract to construct Noida International Airport and operate it for 40 years.

In March 2017, Flughafen Zürich AG announced it had acquired 100% of Brazil's Florianópolis Airport, and will operate it under a concession until 2047. The company also has stakes in the operation of airports in Belo Horizonte, Bogotá, Curaçao, Antofagasta, Iquique. More recently, the company has also won the concession to operate both Vitória and Macaé airports in Brazil. On May 19, 2023 Natal was added to the portfolio.

== Corporate Governance ==
The company has its legal seat in Kloten and falls within the jurisdiction of the district court Bülach. Since March 2001, the airport administration has been centrally located in the new administration building, Unique One, in the west area of the airport, on the border of Rümlang.

CEO of the company is Lukas Brosi, who took over this position in March 2023. The eight-member board of directors also comprises three representatives of the cantonal and one of the municipal governments of Zürich; this principle has been criticized by the business community, and has meanwhile changed. The government council now delegates one of its own members (Carmen Walker Spaeh) as well as two external representatives. The Board of Directors is composed as follows: Josef Felber (President), Claudia Pletscher (Vice President), Beat Schwab, Guglielmo L. Brentel, Stephan Gemkow, Corine Mauch, Carmen Walker Spaeh and Beatrix Frey-Eigenmann. The auditor of Flughafen Zürich AG is EY AG, headquartered in Zürich.

== Shareholders ==
The registered shares of Flughafen Zürich AG are traded on the SIX Swiss Exchange (Valorennummer 1'056'796, SIX symbol FHZN); Major shareholders are the Canton of Zürich with 33.33 percent of the shares and the city of Zürich with 5.05 percent, where as the FZAG is organized as a mixed-economy company.

The Articles of Incorporation contain an opting-up clause, which provides for an offer obligation for minority shareholders to exceed the limit of 49%, in the event of a change of control.

== Key Figures ==
Year	Turnover (CHF in thousands)	of which flight business (CHF in thousands)	of which non-flight business (CHF in thousands)	Group profit (CHF in thousands)
2002	566'362	328'837	237'525	34'773
2003	601'719	347'110	254'609	32'883
2004	683'686	411'754	271'932	52'268
2005	702'229	418'877	283'352	59'123
2006	737'109	444'238	292'871	87'448
2007	802'868	495'981	306'887	130'675
2008	855'103	525'689	329'414	121'314
2009	809'890	501'716	308'174	190'610
2010	851'548	534'722	316'826	138'519
2011	905'404	579'613	325'791	169'845
2012	948'820	596'411	352'409	94'732
2013	975'094	604'491	370'603	137'052
2014	963'479	574'959	388'520	205'921
2015	988'973	597'389	391'584	179'807
2016	1'012'804	620'402	392'402	248'018
2017	1'037'125	624'241	412'884	285'527
2018	1’152’897	656’667	496’230	237’841
2019	1’210’084	661’451	548’633	309’145
2020	624'000	222’000	402’000	(-69'100)
2021	680'000	240’600	439’400	(-10'100)
2022	1'023'500	491'100	532’400	207'000
2023	1'236'300	610’100	626’200	304'200
2024	1'326'300	672'800	653’500	326'700
2025	1'361'100	709'100	652’000	346'500

== Awards ==
- 2025: Best Airport Service Quality in Europe
- 2025: Best airport in Europe World Travel Award
- 2025: 10th worldwide in Skytrax airport rating p. 27

== Publications ==
Flughafen Zürich AG publishes periodical journals, which are also available on the Internet. Homebase is the internal "house newspaper" of FZAG and is primarily aimed at the employees; Unique! was until July 2005, the residents magazine of the company, and was replaced with the new Air Magazine.
