= Zurich Airport =

International airport serving Zurich, Switzerland

Zurich Airport Flughafen Zürich

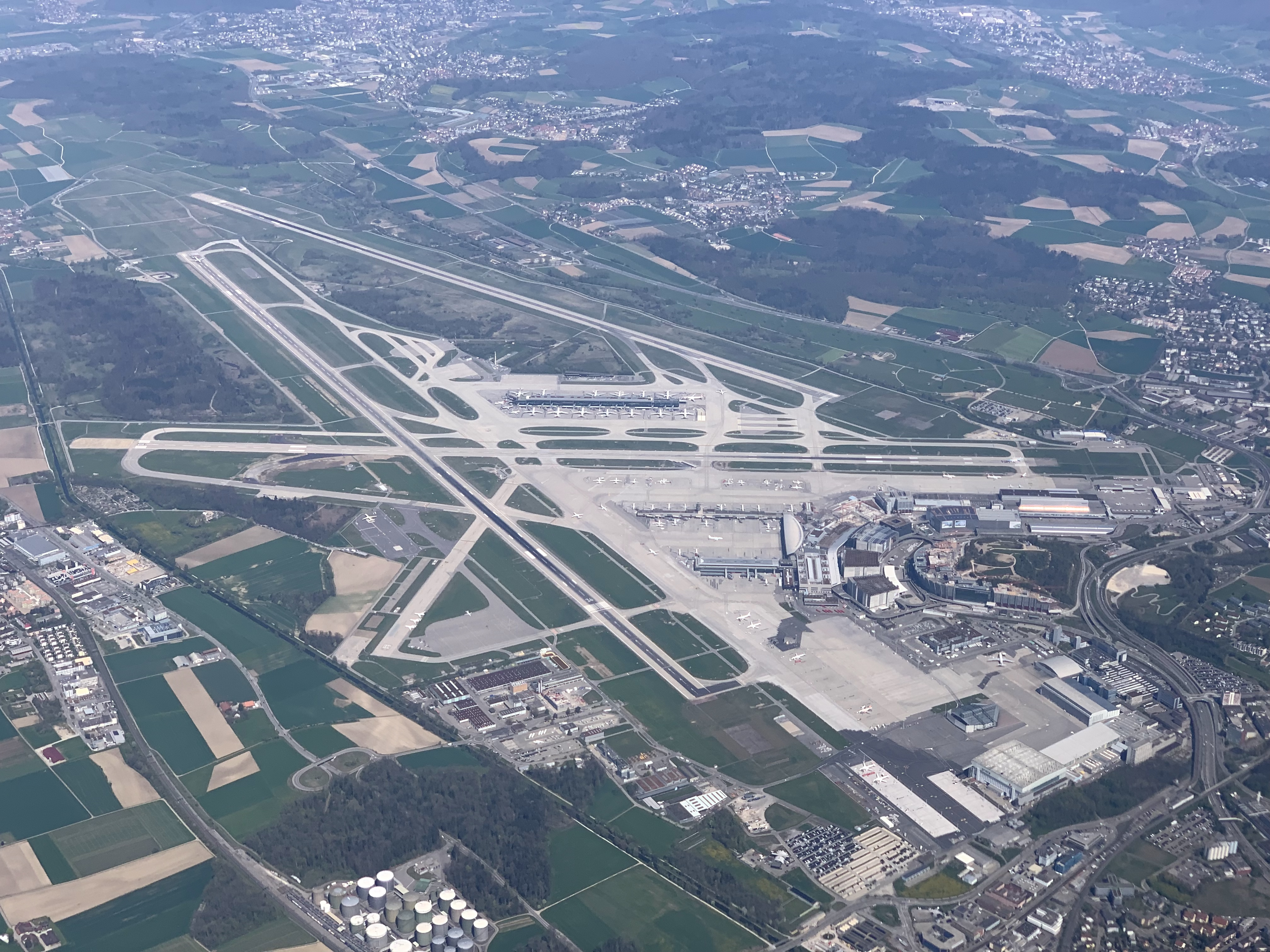
- IATA: ZRH; ICAO: LSZH; WMO: 06670

Summary
- Airport type: Public
- Owner/Operator: Flughafen Zürich AG
- Serves: Zurich metropolitan area; Liechtenstein; Vorarlberg, Austria
- Location: Kloten, Rümlang, Oberglatt, Winkel and Opfikon, canton of Zurich
- Opened: 14 June 1948; 78 years ago
- Hub for: Chair Airlines; Helvetic Airways; Swiss International Air Lines
- Operating base for: Condor; Edelweiss Air
- Elevation AMSL: 432 m (1,417 ft)
- Coordinates: 47°27′53″N 008°32′57″E
- Website: www.zurich-airport.com

Map
- Location of airport in Switzerland ZRH/LSZH (Europe)

Runways
Direction	Length		Surface
Direction	m	ft	Surface
10/28	2,500	8,202	Concrete
14/32	3,300	10,827	Concrete
16/34	3,700	12,139	Concrete

Statistics (2025)
- Passengers: 32,593,966
- Passengers change 2024–25: ▲4.5%
- Aircraft movements: 270,116
- Movements change 2024–25: ▲3.5%

Zurich Airport (German: Flughafen Zürich; IATA: ZRH, ICAO: LSZH) is the largest international airport of Switzerland and the principal hub of Swiss International Air Lines. It serves Zurich, the largest city in Switzerland, and, with its surface transport links, much of the rest of the country. The airport is located nine kilometres (5 1/2 miles) north of central Zurich, in the municipalities of Kloten, Rümlang, Oberglatt, Winkel, and Opfikon, all of which are within the canton of Zurich.

== History ==
=== Early years ===
In the Zurich area, mixed civil and military air traffic developed from 1909 onwards at Dübendorf airfield, northeast of the city. From 1919, the airport was home to Swissair's predecessor Ad Astra Aero, and from 1932 also to Swissair. The first regular international flight service began on 1 June 1922 with an Ad Astra route to Fürth, Germany. In the early years of aviation, the Dübendorf Air Base, located around 9 km (5.6 mi) southeast of Zurich Airport, also served as the city's commercial airfield. The need for a dedicated commercial facility led to the search for a location to build a replacement airport.

In 1939, civil air traffic had to be suspended at the outbreak of the Second World War for military strategic reasons. Although Swissair was allowed to resume scheduled air traffic in September 1940, this remained on a modest scale during the conflict.

In March 1943, the government of the canton of Zurich commissioned a study to identify possible locations to construct a major airport. In its report, a consortium of engineers and architects led by Locher & Cie advised against the previously discussed expansion options at Dübendorf and instead recommended a separate civil airport in the partially forested moorland area of the armoury situated between Kloten and Oberglatt. In August 1943, the Federal Military Department declared its agreement to abandon the armoury as a matter of principle "in the higher national interest".

Locher & Cie submitted "Project I" to the Government on 31 December 1943. Four runways were planned and together with the buildings the required area was 472 hectares (1,170 acres). Without the purchase of land, the project would have cost CHF 87 million. The government found the costs too high and ordered a revision. The "Project II" of 29 April 1944 still provided for an area of 290 hectares (720 acres) at a cost of CHF 65 million, but the government council demanded a further reduction. For "Project III" of 31 July 1944, CHF 54.4 million and 215 hectares (530 acres) were required. The project nevertheless met the requirements of an intercontinental airport. The Government formally approved it and submitted it to the Federal Government, strongly emphasising that the Zurich project was "far superior" to the also planned (and ultimately abandoned) Swiss Central Airport Utzenstorf, near Bern.

In December 1944, the responsible Federal Councillor, Enrico Celio, explicitly spoke out in favour of Zurich-Kloten, in a letter to his counterparts, as did the governments of the cantons of Eastern and Central Switzerland and Ticino a month later. The National Council and Council of States followed this view and on 22 June 1945 approved the "Federal Decree on the Expansion of Civil Airports". Basel, Bern and Geneva were to receive smaller continental airports and be supported with a 30 percent share of the costs. The Zurich project was granted the status of an intercontinental airport and the highest possible subsidy rate of 35 percent.

Switzerland's federal parliament decided in 1945 that Zurich was to be the site of a major airport, and sold 655 hectares (1,620 acres) of the Kloten-Bülach Artillery Garrison (German: Artillerie-Waffenplatz Kloten-Bülach) to the canton of Zurich, giving the canton control of the new airfield. Construction of the airport began the following year.

Initial plans for the airport, as laid out in the Federal Government's scheme of 1945, were centred on facilities capable of handling international airline traffic. Aircraft of up to 80 tonnes were envisaged. The primary runway was to be designed for use in all weather conditions and at night, with a 400-metre (1,300 ft)-wide hard surface running to 3,000 metres (9,800 ft) in length. Additional 100-metre (330 ft) areas were to be provided on the shoulders for lateral protection in case of runway excursions. Additional domestic runways, between 1,000 and 1,400 metres (3,281 and 4,593 ft) in length, were also to be built.

=== First stage of construction: civil engineering ===
On 25 February 1946, the Cantonal Council of Zurich approved a building loan of CHF 36.8 million. The cantonal referendum of 5 May 1946 resulted in a clear approval with 105,705 votes in favour and 29,372 against. "Project IV" never came to fruition, as it was further developed by adapting it to the ICAO standards which were changing rapidly at the time. Instead of four runways, the new "Project V" of 20 May 1946 provided only three. Project VI" of 9 October 1946 increased the dimensions of all three runways. Finally, the slightly modified "Project VII" of 20 December 1947 was realised. Within three years, the design on the drawing board had completely changed from a purely grass airfield with a four-runway system without taxiways to a three-runway system with paved taxiways. The staggered design meant that it was possible to react to changes without having to impose a complete halt to construction.

Construction works finally began on 5 May 1946 with the diversion of the Altbach stream. The 1,900 m (6,234 ft) long West Runway 10/28 was the first runway which was opened on 14 June 1948, and on which the first Swissair Douglas DC-4 took off for London. On behalf of the canton as airport owner, Cantonal Councillor Jakob Kägi gave a speech to mark the inauguration of the new runway and the start of provisional flight operations. Shortly after, on 17 November 1948, the 2,600 m (8,530 ft) long blind runway 16/34 (runway with instrument landing system) was opened for operation, which was attended by the seven members of the cantonal government. In the presence of guests from politics and the media as well as representatives of the construction companies and airlines, the new airport was inaugurated, which meant that the relocation of the entire civil flight operations from Dübendorf to Kloten had already been completed and full operation could begin at the new Zurich Airport.

=== First stage of construction: structural engineering ===
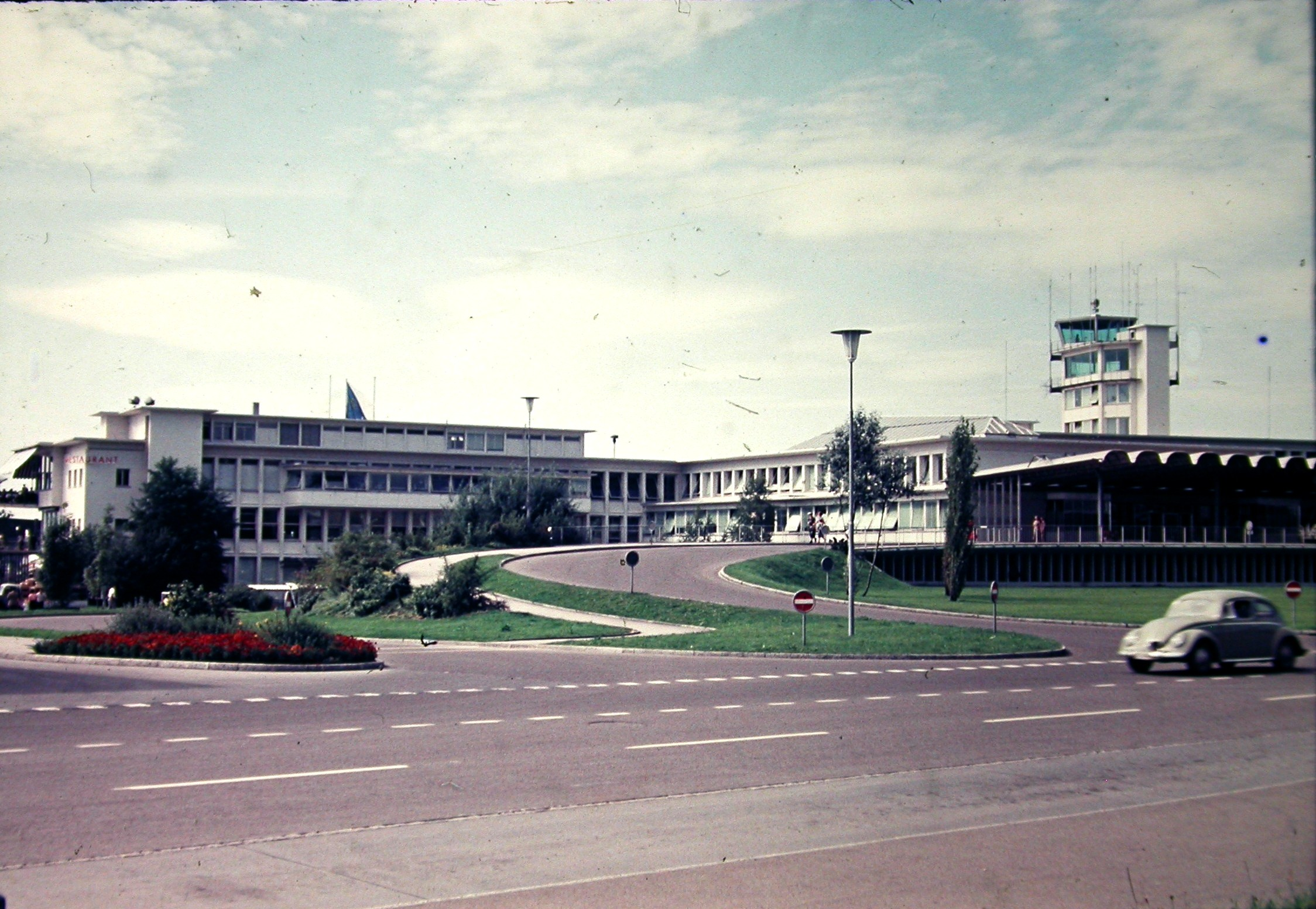
Zurich Airport in 1956

The character of a provisional solution was supported – despite full operation – by the lack of buildings, especially the "Flughof", which had been planned since 1946. Instead, a growing shanty town stood to the east of the reserved building site. On 27 October 1948, the canton outsourced the development, construction and operation of the buildings to the newly founded "Flughafen-Immobilien-Gesellschaft" (FIG), a mixed-economy public limited company in which the public sector held half of the shares (canton of Zurich 22.5%, city of Zurich 18%, "Zürcher Kantonalbank" 5%, city of Winterthur 3.6% and municipality of Kloten 0.9%). The FIG took over projects that had been started and was thus able to hand over the completed "shipyard I" to Swissair for use as early as late autumn 1948, followed by offices for Swissair's technical departments, which were finally able to leave Dübendorf by the end of April 1949. Further workshops, the striking arched hangar and the "Heating Centre I" for the heat supply were completed by the end of 1949.

Based on "Project V", the terminal building had already been designed as a convex building at the airport head in mid-1946. In the following four years, a total of 24 feasible airport project designs were submitted, before the FIG commissioned the construction of the airport according to plans by Alfred and Heinrich Oeschger in November 1950. At the beginning of 1951, the piling work for the terminal building began, the construction work took about two years. With the opening on 9 April 1953, the shanty town could be abandoned. The new building consisted of a central passenger wing, flanked by a restaurant and an office wing. In addition there was a spectator terrace of 200 m (656 ft) length.

=== The first years of operation ===
As had been expected the construction costs had been significantly exceeded. Several metres of raised bog were removed and backfilled with material from the Holberg; the concrete area had also increased from the originally planned 420,000 m^{2} (4,520,000 sq ft) to a good 611,000 m^{2} (6,580,000 sq ft). In addition, the former weapons range area had to be searched for unexploded bombs, of which a total of 157 were found. The costs for "Project IV", estimated at CHF 59.5 million in 1946, had risen to CHF 106 million by the time the civil engineering works under "Project VII" were completed in July 1949. Both chambers of the Federal Assembly concluded the political review with the "Federal Decree on the Payment of Additional Federal Contributions to the Construction of Zurich-Kloten Airport" of 29 September 1949. The Federation contributed CHF 27.1 million and doubled its contribution to the air traffic control facilities. For its part, the Cantonal Council granted a supplementary credit on 13 February 1950. This was accepted by the voters on 7 May 1950 with 73,551 votes to 59,088 (yes share of 55.45%).

The new terminal opened in 1953 with a large air show that ran for three days. In 1947, the airport handled 133,638 passengers on 12,766 airline flights; in 1952, 372,832 passengers on 24,728 airline flights.

=== Second stage of construction ===
Locher & Cie was commissioned in 1954 to design various project options for the second construction phase. In March 1956, the canton submitted an extended project to the Federal Council. In addition to mandatory runway extensions for the incipient "jet age", the project also provided for the extension of the public facilities, which were already overused and dominated by various provisional arrangements; two finger docks were to defuse the situation. On 12 October 1956, the Federal Council recommended that Parliament approve the bill. On 19 December 1956, the Council of States approved the federal contribution of CHF 54.8 million (at a total cost of 181.8 million), and the National Council followed suit on 7 March 1957. The contribution of the canton of Zurich of CHF 74.3 million was still outstanding, the rest was to be raised by FIG and Swissair. The concrete expansion project included the extension of the blind runway to 4,000 metres (13,000 ft) and the western runway to 3,150 metres (10,330 ft), as well as the extension of the buildings. Opponents described the "super airport Kloten" as a "luxury" and criticised that the canton had "lost every measure". Another issue that planners had completely neglected until then was the aircraft noise. With a high turnout of 72.3%, the expansion project failed in the cantonal referendum of 23 June 1957 with 97,603 votes to 83,196 (no vote of 54.0%).

Just four days later, Zurich's cantonal government commissioned a redimensioned expansion project. The blind runway was to be only 3,700 metres (12,100 ft) long, the western runway 2500 m; the construction of the finger docks was abandoned. Thus the canton's share of the project to be approved was only CHF 49.1 million. The government paid far more attention to the aircraft noise. On 6 July 1958, voters approved the project by 107,050 votes to 56,872 (yes share 65.3%), with a 65.6% share. Due to time pressure - the landing of the first jet aircraft was planned for the following year - construction work began without waiting for approval of federal funding. In December 1958 and March 1959 respectively, the National Council and the Council of States granted subsidies of 55.6 million. In 1959, BOAC started regular flight connections to Zurich with the revised "Comet IV", while the airport was still a construction site.

The first buildings were completed in 1960, and the terminal building, which had been considered an attractive design, lost its symmetrical appearance. To the east, towards the former shanty town, office wing A1, office wing B and the air traffic control building were added with a connecting structure. The "Fracht West" building, which had been extended at short notice during construction to provide additional office space, was located somewhat off the main building. In the hangar area in the southwest, Heating Station II was put into operation and the Hangar II, which was designed for jet aircraft, was handed over to Swissair, shortly after the arrival of the Sud Aviation "Caravelle III" and the Douglas DC-8-32 in May 1960. Finally, in the summer of 1961, Swissair's in-flight catering service was given a new building between the head of the airport and the hangar area.

The canton of Zurich acquired a further 135 hectares (330 acres) of land for the expansion of the civil engineering works, which lasted until the beginning of 1961 in parallel with the construction of the buildings. The apron areas were enlarged, particularly at the airport head and in the hangar area; the pier was also extended from 16 to 28 aircraft parking spaces, and buses were purchased to provide access to them. The west runway 10/28 was extended by 600 metres (2,000 ft) to the west, towards Rümlang, and opened on 1 January 1961 with its new operating length of 2,500 metres (8,200 ft). Blind runway 16/34 was extended 400 metres (1,312 ft) to the south in the direction of Opfikon and 700 metres (2,300 ft) to the north in the direction of Oberglatt. At its new operating length of 3,700 metres (12,100 ft), it was released on 15 March 1961. By the time work was completed, the paved area at the airport covered 1,013,000 m^{2} (10,900,000 sq ft).

=== Extension of the Terminal Building ===
Although virtually all the buildings of the second phase had been completed by the end of 1961, the extension of the terminal building was still at the design stage. After the passenger terminal with two finger docks had failed in the cantonal referendum, the FIG had worked out a new project until 1958. This envisaged a two-storey transverse hall on the landside of the airport, on the two main floors of which arriving and departing passengers were functionally separated. For cost reasons, the federal government demanded considerable redimensioning, which led to an open dispute about the preferred design. When the conflict, described by the media as a "war of experts", threatened to escalate, President Willy Spühler invited representatives of the Federation and the cantons to a conference on 9 December 1963.

During the conference, FIG's airport planners and the canton of Zurich prevailed against the federal government. The canton only had to make concessions for the commercial parts of the project, such as the restaurant wing. The dispatch of the Federal Council, submitted on 1 March 1965, requested a federal contribution of 23.1 million to the total costs of 129.4 million. Of this, 2.1 million was earmarked for the connection of the airport to the national road network and the preparation of a connection to the planned (but never built) Zurich underground railway. The National Council and Council of States adopted the bill in October 1965, allowing construction work to begin the following year. The motorway loop was in operation from 1968. Finally, with the opening of the last new hall wing on 1 April 1971, the extension of the terminal building was completed.

The first signs of noise mitigation for the airport were in 1972, when a night-time curfew was enacted, as well as in 1974 when new approach routes were introduced. Runway 14/32 was opened in 1976, and 16/34 began renovation.

=== Attacks on El Al aircraft ===
On 18 February 1969, four armed members of the Popular Front for the Liberation of Palestine (PFLP) attacked El Al flight 432, firing Kalashnikov assault rifles at the Boeing 707-120B whilst it prepared for takeoff. The Shin Bet employee Mordechai Rachamim fired back with his pistol and killed the terrorist Abdel Mohsen Hassan. The three remaining assassins were each sentenced to twelve years in prison. The aircraft's co-pilot subsequently died of his injuries.

The attack marked the beginning of a discussion about airport security that had never been raised until then in Switzerland. On 21 February 1970, a parcel bomb exploded in Swissair's Convair CV-990 on the flight SR330 (Zurich–Tel Aviv). In the crash near Würenlingen all 47 people on board were killed. Investigations revealed that a PFLP terrorist group had carried out the bomb attack. The actual target, however, had been an El Al flight from Munich to Tel Aviv, whose mail had been sent with Swissair to Zurich due to long delays. In 1970, the PFLP obtained the release of the three terrorists convicted in Switzerland and other comrades-in-arms imprisoned abroad through coordinated hijackings. Flights affected were SR 100 (Zurich–New York), TWA flight TW741, Pan Am flight PA93 and BOAC flight BA775.

=== Third stage of construction ===
In January 1969, the Zurich's Cantonal Council approved a loan for preparatory work for the third stage of expansion. The project that was subsequently drawn up exceeded the previous dimensions. The plans included the extension of the existing runways, a 3,300 metres (10,800 ft) long runway, additional taxiways, the enlargement of the pier to 47 stands, a new terminal with finger dock, two multi-storey car parks, additional technical buildings, an airport railway station and a new hangar. In addition, there were various extensions and conversions of existing buildings. The costs were estimated at CHF 777.6 million (not including the air traffic control building and railway station). Since this project was hardly different from the "super airport" rejected in 1957, criticism was immediately voiced again by the "Protection Association of the Population around Zurich Airport" (SBFZ) and the community of Höri, which was located directly in the approach corridor. The SBFZ even demanded the resumption of the central airport concept that was dropped in 1945 – instead of Utzenstorf this time in the "Grosse Moos", with two runways jutting into Lake Neuchâtel.

The supporters of the Zurich airport expansion argued primarily for the economic benefit. To take the wind out of the sails of aircraft noise criticism, the government and cantonal council drafted an aircraft noise law (including a ban on night flights), which was to be submitted to a referendum at the same time as the expansion bill. After the Cantonal Council had approved both bills in July 1970, the referendum was held on 27 September 1970. The proposal for expansion was approved by 103,867 votes to 64,192 (61.8% yes), and the Aircraft Noise Act by 134,501 votes to 32,590 (80.5% yes). The following year, the Federal Assembly approved a federal contribution of 240.3 million. Construction work on the third stage also began in 1971. In 1973, Hangar III, Cargo Hall East, Car Park F and the General Aviation Centre were completed. In 1974 the "Werkhof" (work yard), an office building and multistorey car park E were added, in 1975 the apron, multi-storey car park B and Terminal B with finger dock, and in 1976 the Airport Plaza shopping and service centre located in multi-storey car park B.

Additional costs were incurred due to numerous adjustments to the construction project. The additional credit of 25.8 million was accepted by Zurich voters on 7 December 1975 with 178,723 to 87,303 votes (67.2% yes). The canton supplemented this credit with ordinary and extraordinary budget credits from the building department. In March 1976 the Federal Assembly approved an additional federal contribution of 39.7 million. As the centrepiece of the third stage, runway 14/32 was opened on 1 April 1976, increasing capacity by a third. In the early days, the new runway served exclusively for landing traffic. The rail link, which had been approved by parliament in 1975 in a separate federal decree, was still outstanding. As this was a project of the Swiss Federal Railways (SBB), the cost allocation differed greatly. Of the total costs of 285 million, the SBB contributed 60%, the Federation 33% and the canton of Zurich 7%. The project comprised the Zurich Airport railway station under Terminal B (on which construction had been underway since 1971) and a new line between Bassersdorf and Glattbrugg. After nine years of construction, the ceremonial opening of the airport line took place on 29 May 1980.

=== Fourth stage of construction ===
In the second half of the 1970s, the volume of traffic continued to rise sharply, so the canton of Zurich, the FIG and Swissair worked out a project for the fourth construction phase. On 28 September 1980, with 142,240 to 104,775 votes (57.6%), Zurich voters accepted a loan of CHF 48 million for civil engineering works, which were part of the forthcoming construction work.

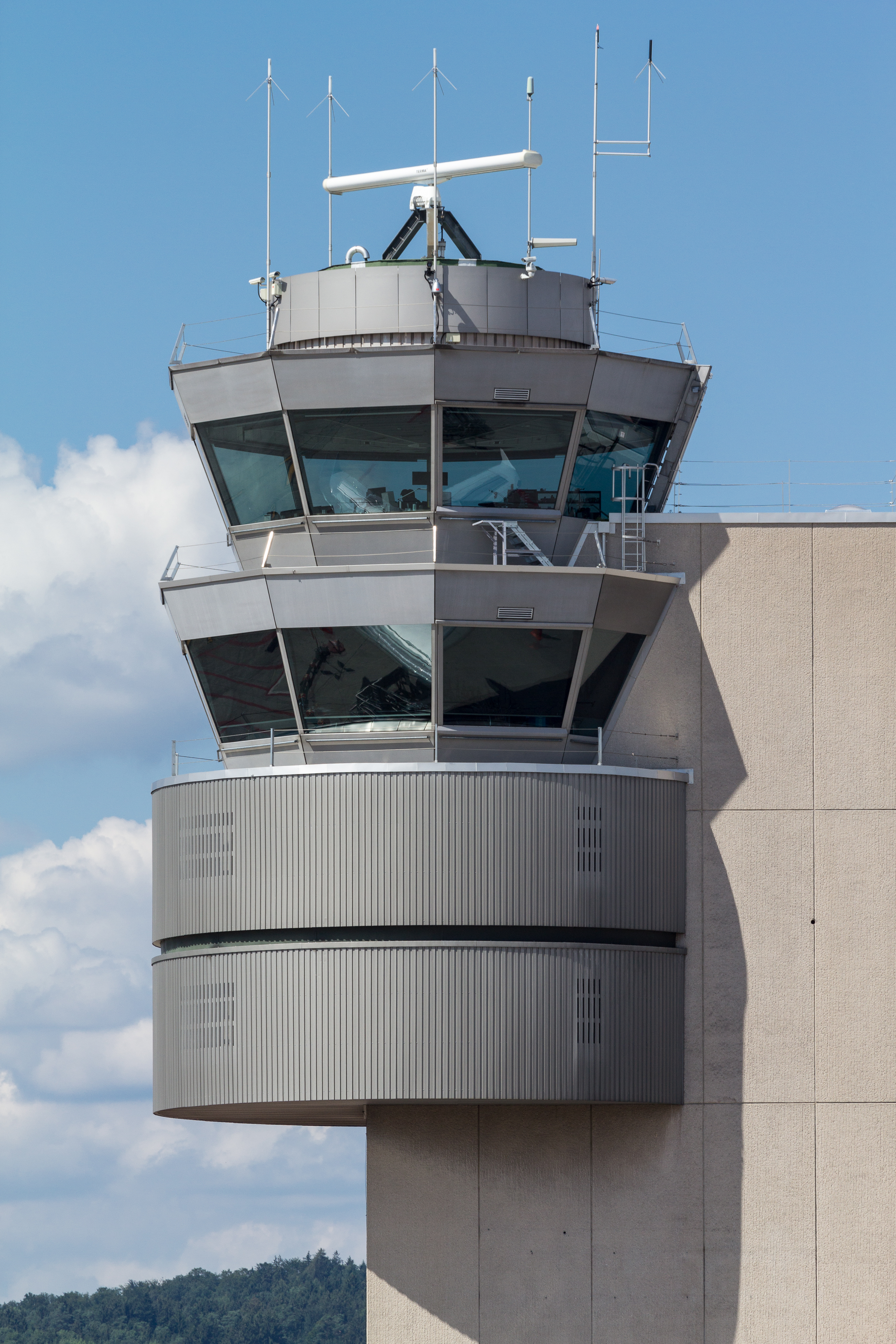
Control tower in 2012

Also in 1980, the Federal Office of Civil Aviation published a new airport concept, which replaced that of 1945. The focus was now on qualitative expansion, taking into account spatial planning and environmental protection considerations. Based on this concept, the Federal Assembly approved the "Building Programme 1981–1985". This programme provided for investments of CHF 393.3 million in Zurich-Kloten, but the subsidy contribution of 10.3% was significantly lower than for the Geneva and Basel-Mulhouse airports. This was justified by the catch-up demand of the two other major Swiss airports. The central element of the fourth stage was the finger dock in Terminal A with 13 docking positions. Also planned were a new control tower, a baggage sorting system, an additional multi-storey car park, waiting rooms and an operations centre for aircraft crews. Later, Zurich's cantonal government also decided to renew the damaged western runway, which had to be closed for two and a half months in the summer of 1985 for this purpose. Fingerdock A was put into operation on 1 November 1985, and the new 41 m-high (135 ft) control tower on 29 April 1986. There were also plans to expand the airport's cargo facilities. However, a corresponding loan of CHF 57 million was narrowly rejected in the referendum of 6 September 1987 by 106,722 to 98,663 votes (52.0% against). The project, which was subsequently revised and approved by Zurich's Cantonal Council in 1989, focused on more efficient use of the existing facilities, thereby enabling the handling of an additional 100,000 tonnes of freight annually.

=== Fifth stage of construction ("Airport 2000") ===
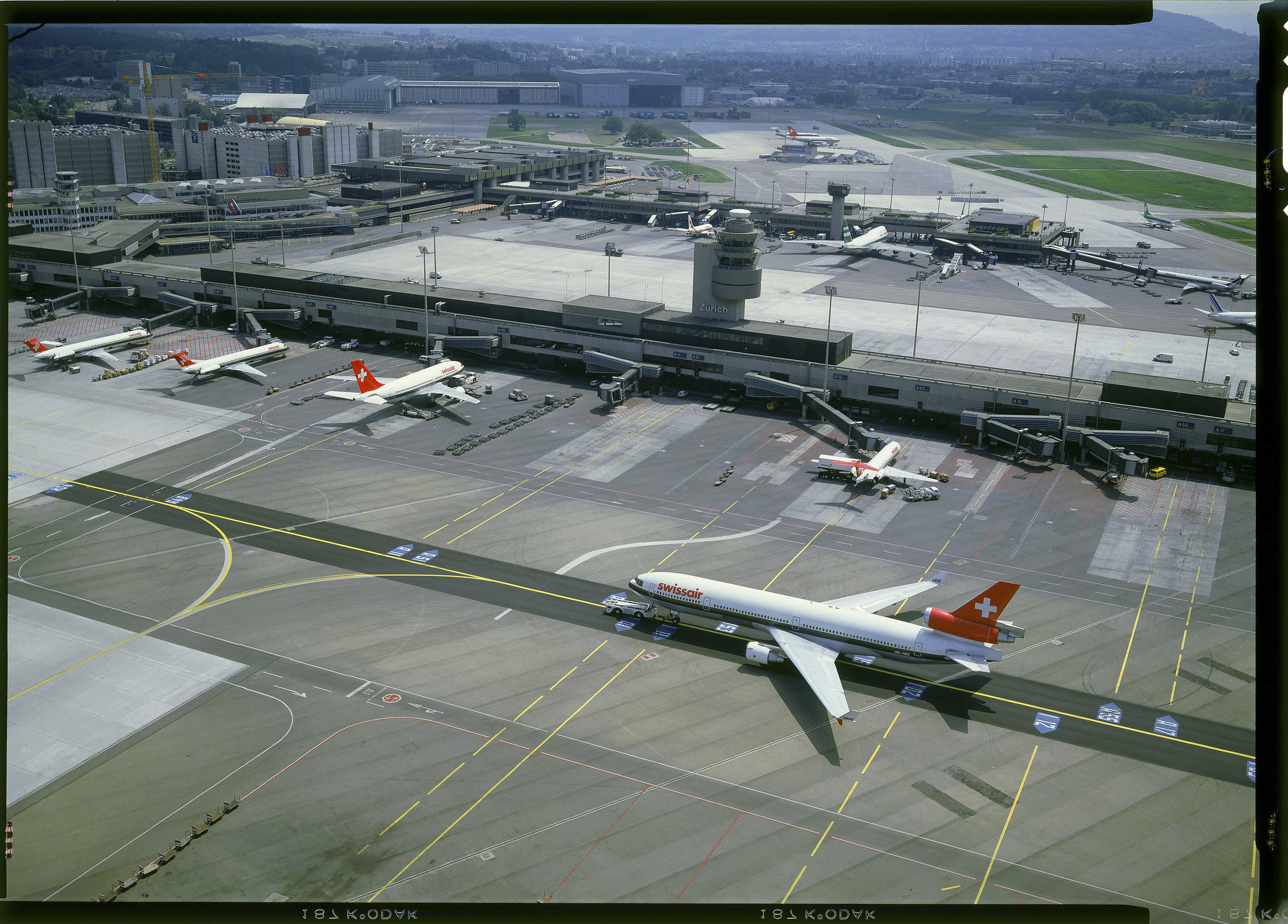
Zurich airport in 1992

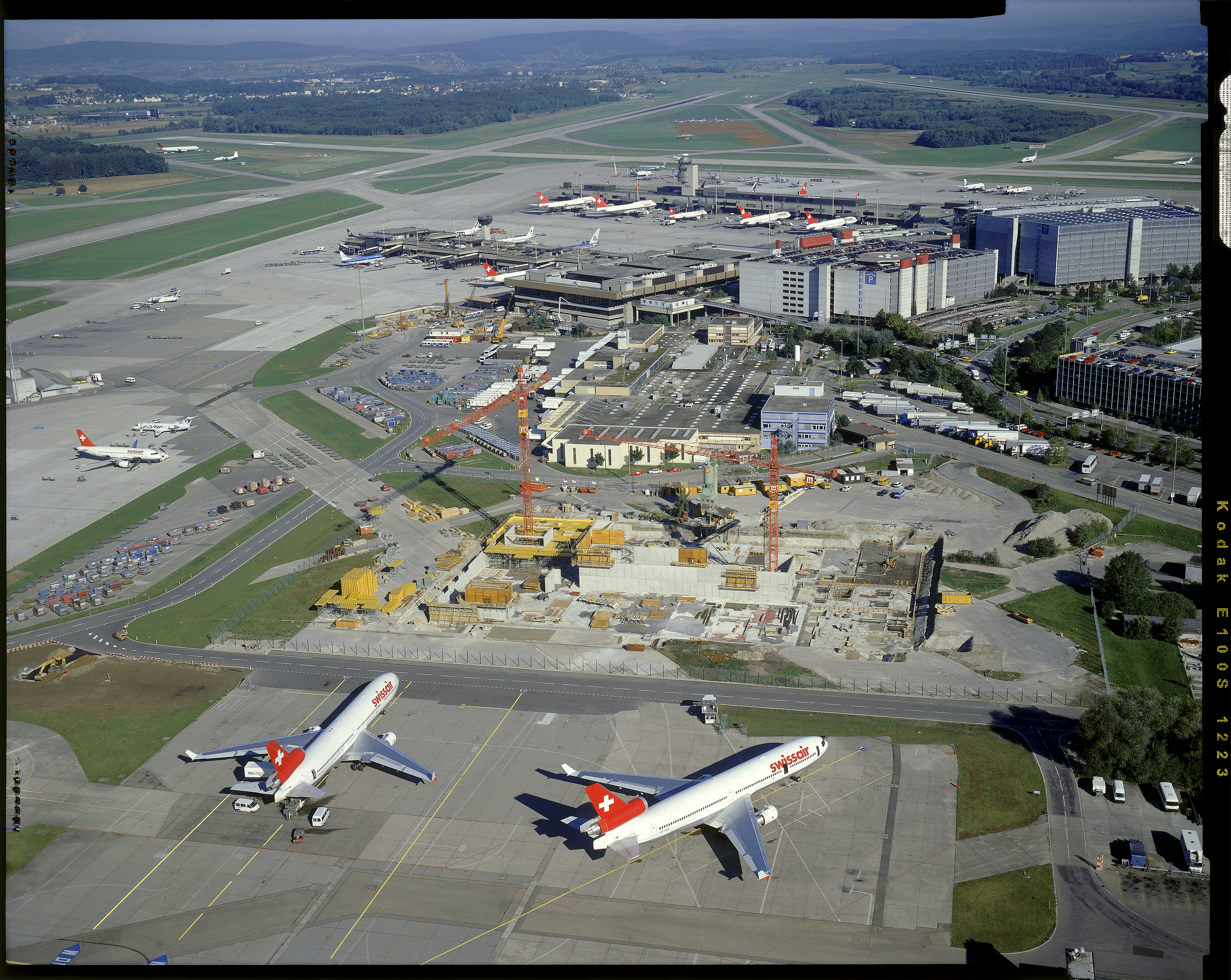
Zurich airport, construction site in 1998

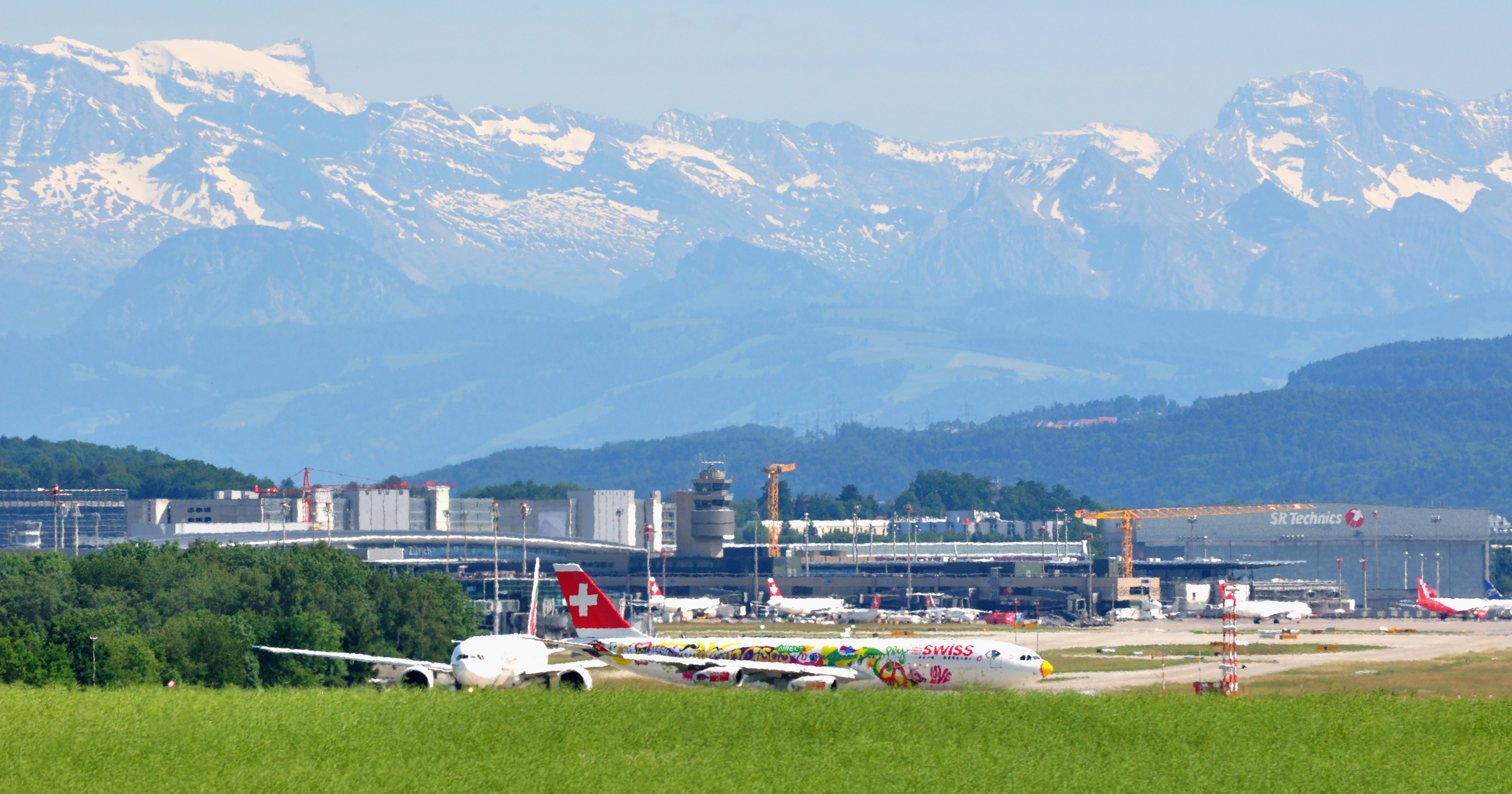
Zurich Airport with the Swiss Alps visible in the background

The cantonal popular initiative "for moderate air traffic" submitted in January 1991 intended to limit the airport to its then status, i.e. neither to allow more aircraft movements nor to expand the infrastructure. In the vote of 26 September 1993, however, it did not stand a chance, and was rejected by 235,531 votes to 112,476 (67.6%).

Nine months later, Zurich's cantonal government submitted a proposal for a loan of CHF 873 million to the cantonal council. The fifth construction phase, known as "Airport 2000" and costing a total of CHF 2.4 billion, was intended to replace outdated systems and further expand existing facilities. At the heart of the project was the construction of a third terminal, Dock E "Midfield", located between the three runways. The Skymetro aerial tramway, a road tunnel and underground baggage conveyors were necessary for its development. Also part of the fifth stage was the construction of the new passenger hub "Airside Center". The Cantonal Council approved the project at the end of February 1995. It cleared the last hurdle in the referendum of 25 June 1995, when it was approved by 224,668 votes to 105,859 (68.0% Yes).

After almost nine years of construction, the project was completed in 2004. The project was undertaken by architect Nicholas Grimshaw.

=== Zurich 2010 project ===
The next major event for the airport was in 1999 when the Parliament of the canton of Zurich approved the privatization of Zurich Airport. The following year, Flughafen Zürich AG, trading under the brand "Unique", became the new airport operator. The company dropped the brand "Unique" in favour of "Zurich Airport" and "Flughafen Zürich" in 2010.

On 2 October 2001, a major cash-flow crisis at Swissair, exacerbated by the global downturn in air travel caused by the September 11 attacks, caused the airline to ground all its flights. Although a government rescue plan permitted some flights to restart a few days later, and the airline's assets were subsequently sold to become Swiss International Air Lines, the airport lost a large volume of traffic. After Lufthansa took control of Swiss International Air Lines in 2005, traffic began to grow again.

On 18 October 2001, Germany and Switzerland signed a treaty regarding the limitation of flights over Germany. Under the terms of this treaty, any incoming aircraft after 22:00 had to approach Zurich from the east to land on runway 28, which, unlike the airport's other runways, was not equipped with an instrument landing system. A month later, at 22:06 on 24 November, an inbound Crossair Avro RJ100 using this approach in conditions of poor visibility crashed into a range of hills near Bassersdorf and exploded, killing 24 of the 33 people on board. The flight had originally been scheduled to land on runway 14 before 22:00, but it was subject to delay and was therefore diverted to runway 28.

Zurich Airport completed a major expansion project in 2003, in which it built a new parking garage, a new midfield terminal, and an automated underground people mover to link the midfield terminal to the main terminal. In November 2008 a complete renovation and rebuild of the old terminal B structure was announced. The new terminal B opened in November 2011 and provides segregated access to and from aircraft for Schengen and non-Schengen passengers. Zurich Airport handled 25.5 million passengers in 2014, up 2.5 percent from 2013.

Etihad Regional ceased on 18 February 2015 to fly two-thirds of its scheduled routes without further notice, amongst them all its services from Zurich except the domestic service to Geneva. Etihad Regional blamed the failure of its expansion on the behavior of competitors, especially Swiss International Air Lines, as well as the Swiss aviation authorities.

Following the demolition of some office buildings, the construction of the new baggage sorting facilities between the Operations Center and Terminal 1 began in spring 2018 with a total investment of CHF 500 million.

As of 2020, the marketing of all advertising space at the airport was transferred from Clear Channel to APG.

Terminal A has reached the end of its life cycle and will be completely rebuilt – including the tower of the Skyguide Air Traffic Control. The project was originally put on hold due to the COVID-19 pandemic, but was restarted in 2023 with construction to begin in 2030. The earliest expected completion is 2033. The replacement will be built largely of sustainable wood and be used for photovoltaics, thus making a major contribution to the airport's CO_{2} reduction strategy.

== Corporate affairs ==
The airport is owned by Flughafen Zürich AG, a company quoted on the SIX Swiss Exchange. Major shareholders include the canton of Zurich, with 33.33% plus one of the shares, and the city of Zurich, with 5% of the shares. No other shareholder has a holding exceeding 3%. Flughafen Zürich AG used the brand name "Unique" from 2000 until 2010.

The company has stakes in various other airports around the world.

== Infrastructure ==
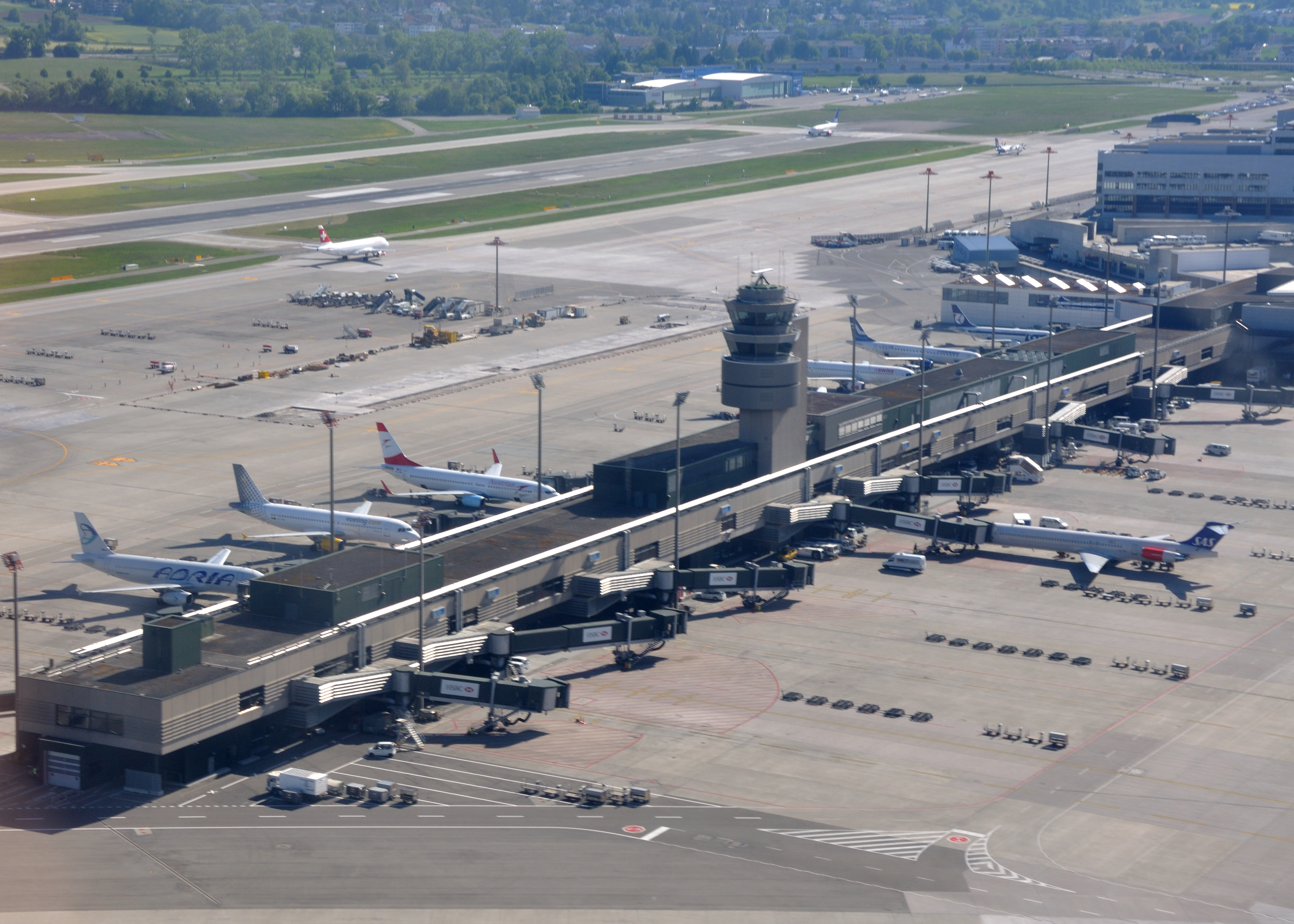
Terminal A for domestic and Schengen destinations

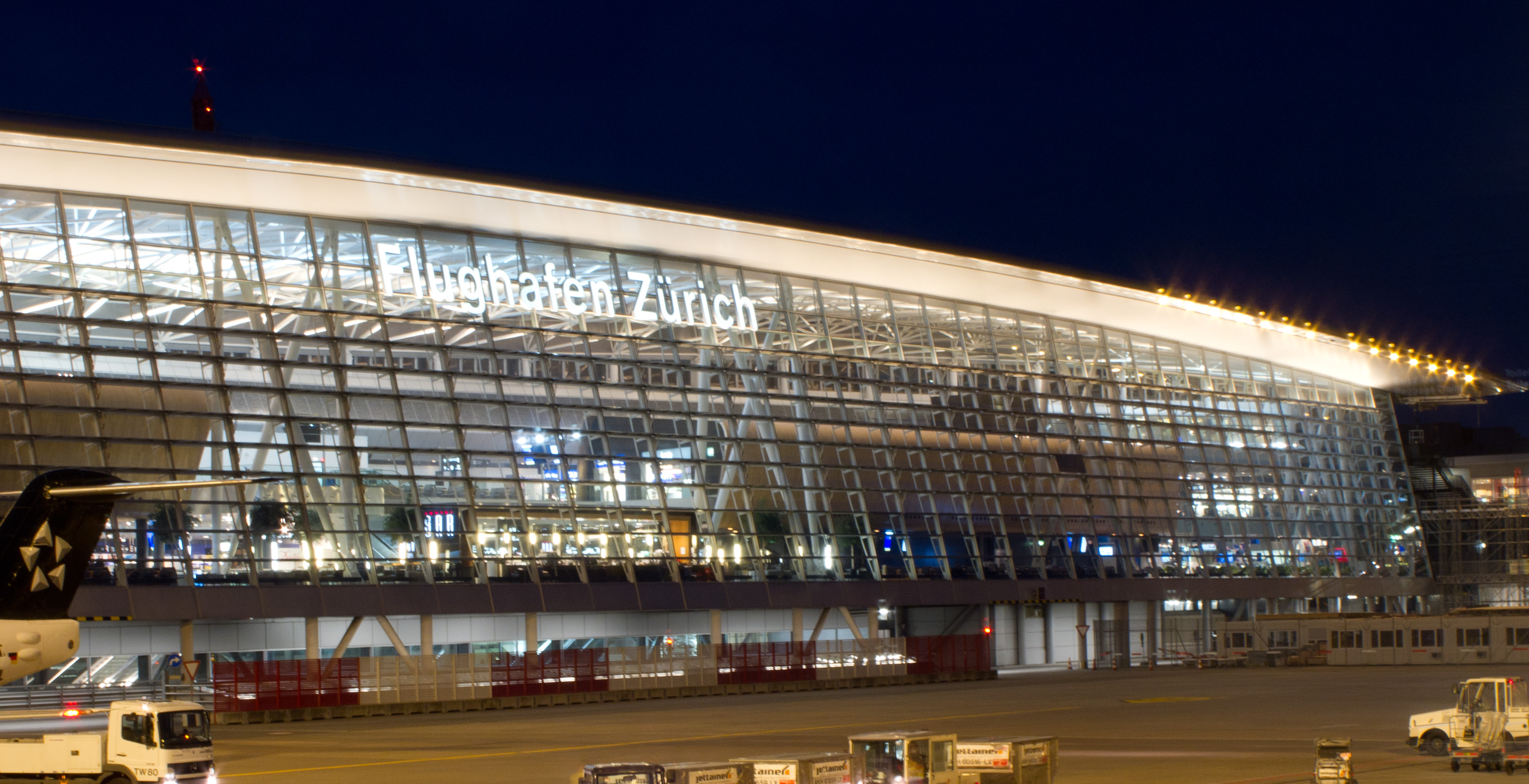
The Airside Centre by night

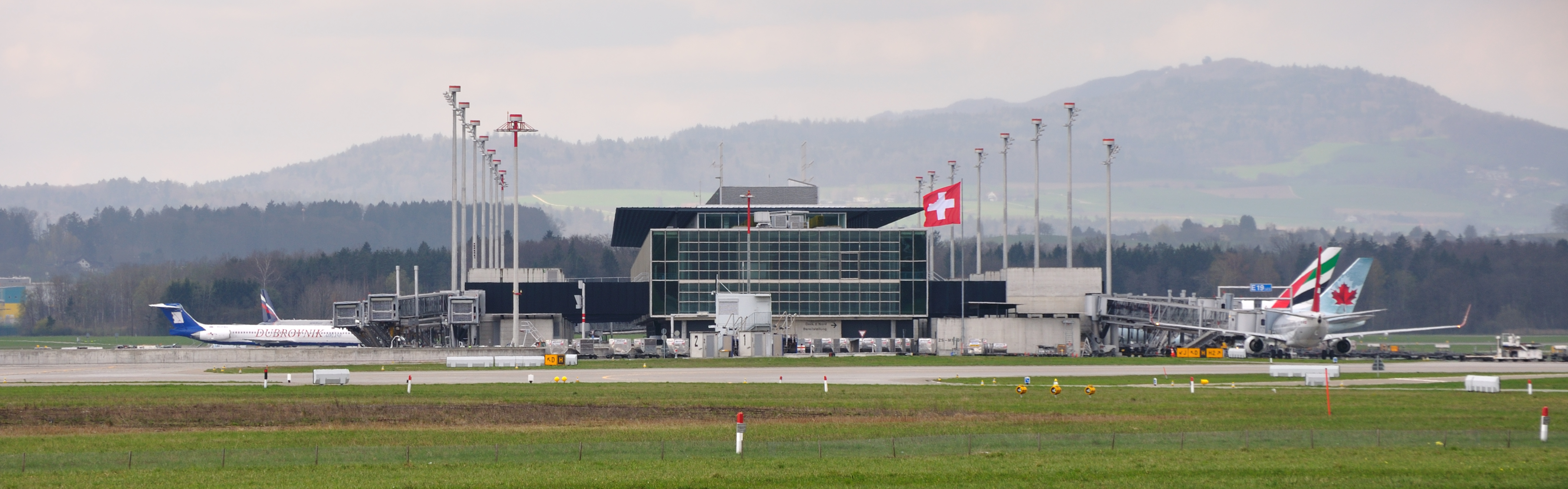
Terminal E

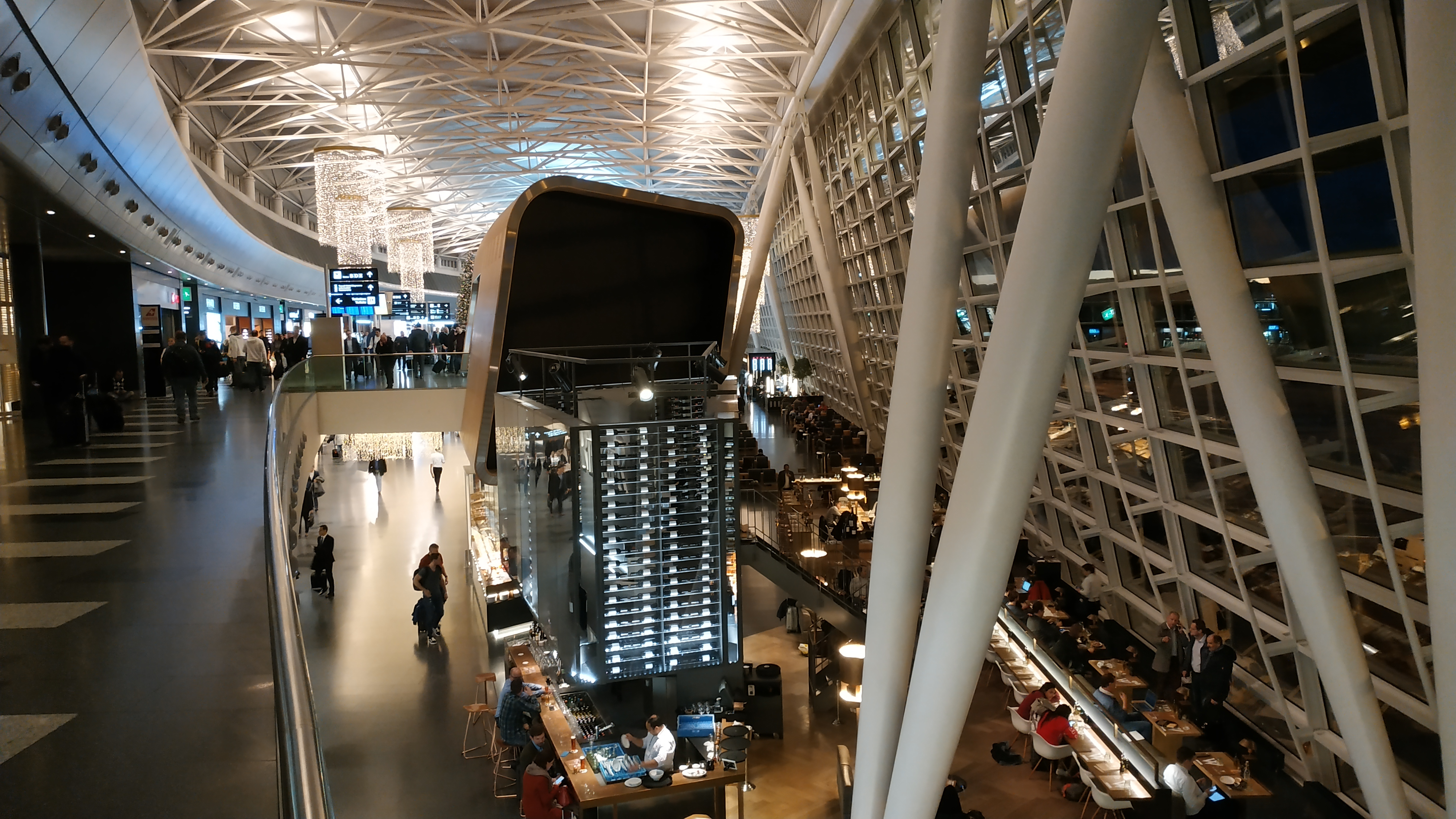
Terminal interior

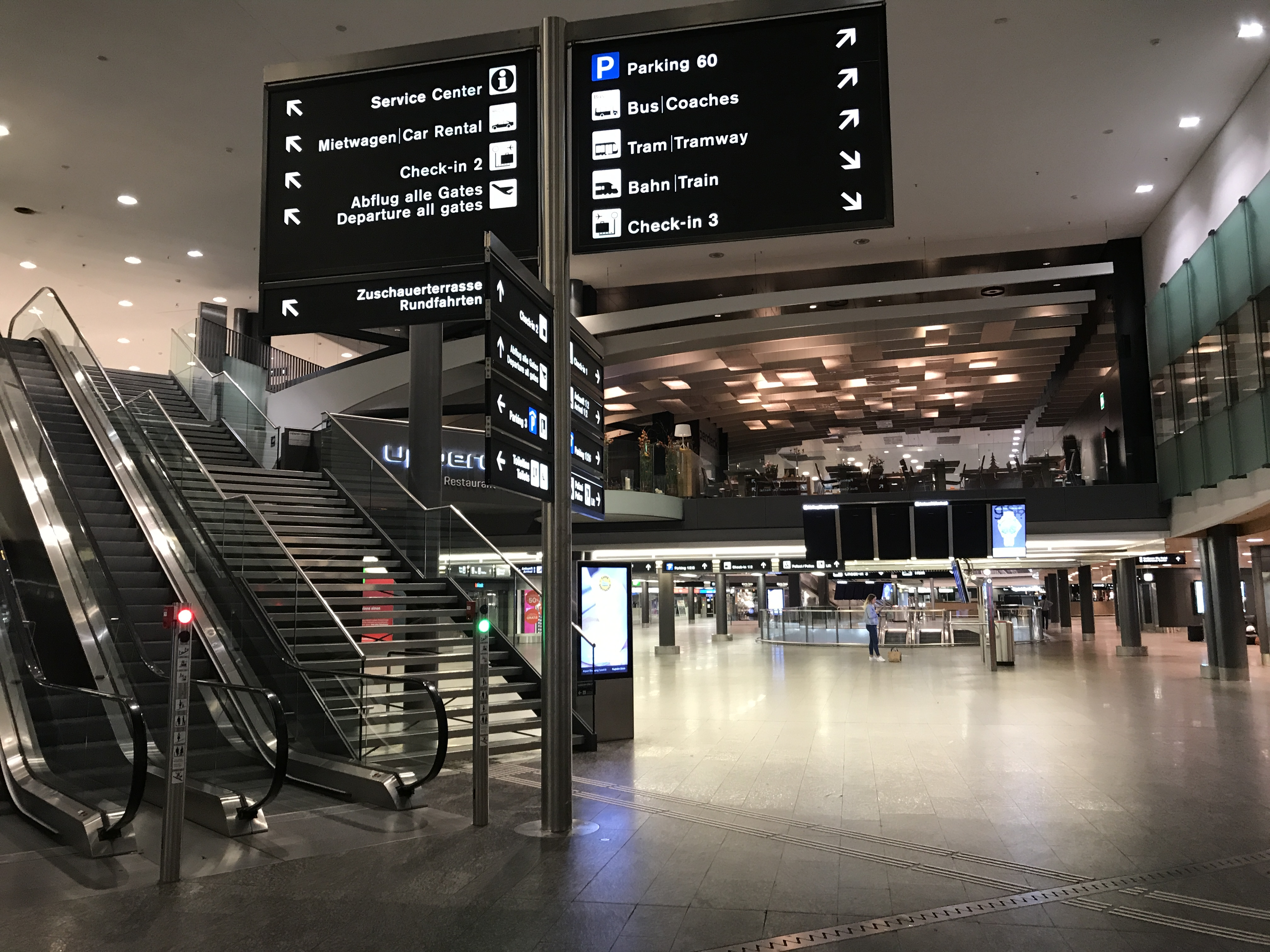
Terminal interior

=== Terminal complex ===
The airport has three airside piers, which are known as terminals A, B, and E (also signposted as Gates A, B/D, and E). These are linked to a central air-side building called Airside Centre, built in 2003. Alongside the Airside Centre, the ground-side terminal complex named Airport Centre comprises several buildings, and includes airline check-in areas, a shopping mall, a railway station, car parks, and a bus and tram terminal. All departing passengers access the same departure level of the Airside Centre, which includes duty-free shopping and various bars and restaurants, via airport security. They are then segregated between passengers for Schengen and non-Schengen destinations on the way to the gate lounges, with the latter first passing through emigration controls. Arriving Schengen and non-Schengen passengers are handled in separate areas of the Airside Centre and reach it by different routes, with non-Schengen passengers first passing through immigration controls. The three airside terminals are:

==== Terminal A ====
Terminal A contains gates prefixed A. It opened in 1971, and it is used exclusively by flights to and from destinations inside the Schengen Area, including domestic flights to Geneva. Since its expansion in 1982–1985, it takes the form of a finger pier, directly connected at one end to the Airside Centre.

Terminal A was scheduled to be torn down and replaced by an entirely new facility from 2021. However, in the wake of the COVID-19 pandemic the start of the project has been postponed for at least three years.

==== Terminal B ====
Terminal B contains gates prefixed B and D. It opened in 1975 and reopened in November 2011 after an extensive three-year reconstruction. Like terminal A, it takes the form of a finger pier directly connected at one end to the Airside Centre. Since reconstruction, it can accommodate both Schengen and non-Schengen flights at the same gates. Each gate has two numbers, one prefixed B and the other D, but with different passenger routes to and from the gates to separate the flows of Schengen and non-Schengen passengers.

==== Terminal E ====
Terminal E contains gates prefixed E and is also known as the midfield terminal or Dock E. It is a stand-alone satellite terminal located on the opposite side of runway 10/28 from the Airside Centre, and is situated between runways 16/34 and 14/32. It is entirely used by non-Schengen international flights and became operational on 1 September 2003. It is connected to the Airside Centre by the Skymetro, an automated underground people mover.

=== Runways ===
Zurich Airport has three runways: 16/34 of 3,700 m (12,100 ft) in length, 14/32 of 3,300 m (10,800 ft) in length, and 10/28 of 2,500 m (8,200 ft) in length. For most of the day and in most conditions, runway 14 is used for landings and runways 16 and 28 are used for takeoffs, although different patterns are used early morning and in the evenings. Zurich voters approved the extension of two runways at Zurich Airport on 3 March 2024. The extension of runway 28 by 400 metres (1,300 ft) to the west and runway 32 by 280 metres (920 ft) to the north is expected to increase safety and reduce noise pollution. The project is supported by the government of Zurich and the majority of political parties.

== Airlines and destinations ==
=== Passenger ===
The following airlines offer regular scheduled and charter flights at Zurich Airport:

Airlines	Destinations
Aegean Airlines	Athens, Thessaloniki; Seasonal: Heraklion
Aer Lingus	Dublin
airBaltic	Riga, Vilnius
Air Cairo	Seasonal: Hurghada, Marsa Alam
Air Canada	Toronto–Pearson
Air Corsica	Seasonal: Ajaccio
Air Dolomiti	Frankfurt, Munich
Air Europa	Madrid
Air France	Paris–Charles de Gaulle
Air India	Delhi
Air Montenegro	Podgorica
Air Serbia	Belgrade
AJet	Istanbul–Sabiha Gökçen
American Airlines	Philadelphia; Seasonal: Dallas/Fort Worth
Austrian Airlines	Vienna
BeOnd	Dubai–Al Maktoum, Malé
British Airways	London–City, London–Heathrow
Brussels Airlines	Brussels
Bulgaria Air	Sofia
Cathay Pacific	Hong Kong
Chair Airlines	Hurghada, London–Southend (begins 27 May 2027), Marrakesh, Marsa Alam, Ohrid, Palma de Mallorca, Pristina, Skopje; Seasonal: Heraklion, Kos, Larnaca, Patras, Porto, Rhodes, Tirana, Tuzla,
China Eastern Airlines	Shanghai–Pudong
Condor	Frankfurt; Seasonal: Corfu (begins 2 July 2027), Heraklion, Ibiza, Kos, Lamezia Terme (begins 17 May 2027), Larnaca, Palma de Mallorca, Rhodes
Corendon Airlines	Seasonal: Antalya
Croatia Airlines	Split, Zagreb; Seasonal: Dubrovnik
Cyprus Airways	Larnaca
Delta Air Lines	New York–JFK; Seasonal: Atlanta
easyJet	Berlin, Bordeaux, Bristol, Edinburgh, Lisbon, London–Gatwick, London–Luton, Manchester, Marrakesh, Porto, Pristina, Rome–Fiumicino; Seasonal: Alicante, Faro, London–Stansted, Málaga, Naples, Olbia, Palma de Mallorca
Edelweiss Air	Bilbao, Cancún, Catania, Edinburgh, Fuerteventura, Funchal, Gran Canaria, Hurghada, Lamezia Terme, Lanzarote, Larnaca, Marsa Alam, Mauritius, Palma de Mallorca, Pristina, Punta Cana, Reykjavík–Keflavík, San José (CR), Seville, Skopje, Split, Tampa, Tbilisi, Tenerife–South, Tromsø; Seasonal: Agadir, Akureyri, Antalya, Bari, Biarritz, Bergen, Boa Vista, Bodrum, Bogotá, Bristol, Cagliari, Calgary, Calvi, Cape Town, Cartagena, Chania, Colombo–Bandaranaike, Corfu, Cork, Dalaman, Djerba, Faro, Figari, Giza, Glasgow, Halifax, Harstad/Narvik, Heraklion, Ibiza, Ivalo, Jerez de la Frontera, Kalamata, Kefalonia, Kilimanjaro, Kittilä, Kos, Kuusamo, La Palma, Las Vegas, Liberia (CR), Luleå, Luxor, Mahé, Malé, Marrakesh, Menorca, Montego Bay, Mykonos, Newquay, Ohrid, Olbia, Phuket, Ponta Delgada, Praia, Preveza, Puerto Plata, Pula, Rhodes, Rovaniemi, Sal, Salalah, Samos, Santiago de Compostela, Santorini, São Vicente, Sharm El Sheikh, Skiathos, Terceira, Tivat, Vancouver, Varna, Windhoek–Hosea Kutako, Zadar, Zakynthos, Zanzibar; Charter: Kangerlussuaq
Egyptair	Cairo
El Al	Tel Aviv
Emirates	Dubai–International
Ethiopian Airlines	Addis Ababa, Milan–Malpensa
Etihad Airways	Abu Dhabi
Eurowings	Berlin, Cologne/Bonn, Düsseldorf, Hamburg
Finnair	Helsinki; Seasonal: Kittilä (begins 3 December 2026)
GP Aviation	Pristina
Helvetic Airways	Seasonal: Harstad/Narvik, Kittilä, Ohrid, Pristina
Iberia	Madrid
Icelandair	Reykjavík–Keflavík
ITA Airways	Rome–Fiumicino
KLM	Amsterdam
KM Malta Airlines	Malta
Korean Air	Seasonal: Seoul–Incheon
Kuwait Airways	Seasonal: Kuwait City
Loganair	Seasonal charter: Guernsey, Jersey
LOT Polish Airlines	Warsaw–Chopin
Lufthansa	Frankfurt, Munich
Nesma Airlines	Seasonal: Hurghada (begins 19 March 2027)
Nile Air	Charter: Hurghada
Norwegian Air Shuttle	Seasonal: Oslo
Oman Air	Muscat
Pegasus Airlines	Istanbul–Sabiha Gökçen, İzmir
Qatar Airways	Doha
Royal Air Maroc	Casablanca
Royal Jordanian	Amman–Queen Alia
Saudia	Jeddah, Riyadh
Scandinavian Airlines	Copenhagen, Oslo, Stockholm–Arlanda
Singapore Airlines	Singapore
SunExpress	Ankara, Antalya, Gaziantep, İzmir; Seasonal: Dalaman
Swiss International Air Lines	Alicante, Amsterdam, Athens, Bangkok–Suvarnabhumi, Barcelona, Beirut (resumes 4 December 2026), Belgrade, Bengaluru, Berlin, Birmingham, Bologna, Bordeaux, Boston, Bremen, Brindisi, Brussels, Bucharest–Otopeni, Budapest, Buenos Aires–Ezeiza, Cairo, Chicago–O'Hare, Cluj-Napoca, Copenhagen, Delhi, Dresden, Dubai–International (resumes 25 November 2026), Dublin, Düsseldorf, Edinburgh, Florence, Frankfurt, Gdańsk, Geneva, Gothenburg, Graz, Hamburg, Hanover, Hong Kong, Johannesburg–O.R. Tambo, Košice, Kraków, Lisbon, Ljubljana, London–City, London–Gatwick, London–Heathrow, Los Angeles, Luxembourg, Madrid, Málaga, Manchester, Marseille, Miami, Milan–Malpensa, Montreal–Trudeau, Mumbai, Munich, Naples, New York–JFK, Newark, Nice, Oslo, Palermo, Palma de Mallorca, Paris–Charles de Gaulle, Porto, Poznań, Prague, Rome–Fiumicino, San Francisco, São Paulo-Guarulhos, Sarajevo, Shanghai–Pudong, Singapore, Sofia, Stockholm–Arlanda, Stuttgart, Tallinn, Tel Aviv, Thessaloniki, Tirana, Tokyo–Narita, Valencia, Venice, Vilnius, Warsaw–Chopin, Washington–Dulles, Wrocław; Seasonal: Billund, Dubrovnik, Heringsdorf, Malta, Montpellier, Niš, Rijeka, Seoul–Incheon, Sylt, Toronto–Pearson, Toulouse (resumes 25 June 2027)
TAP Air Portugal	Lisbon, Porto
Thai Airways International	Bangkok–Suvarnabhumi
Travelcoup	Seasonal: Ibiza, Munich, Palma de Mallorca
Turkish Airlines	Istanbul
United Airlines	Chicago–O'Hare, Newark, Washington–Dulles; Seasonal: San Francisco
Vueling	Barcelona; Seasonal: Palma de Mallorca, Santiago de Compostela

=== Cargo ===
Airlines	Destinations
Korean Air Cargo	Seoul–Incheon, Vienna
Turkish Cargo	Istanbul

== Statistics ==
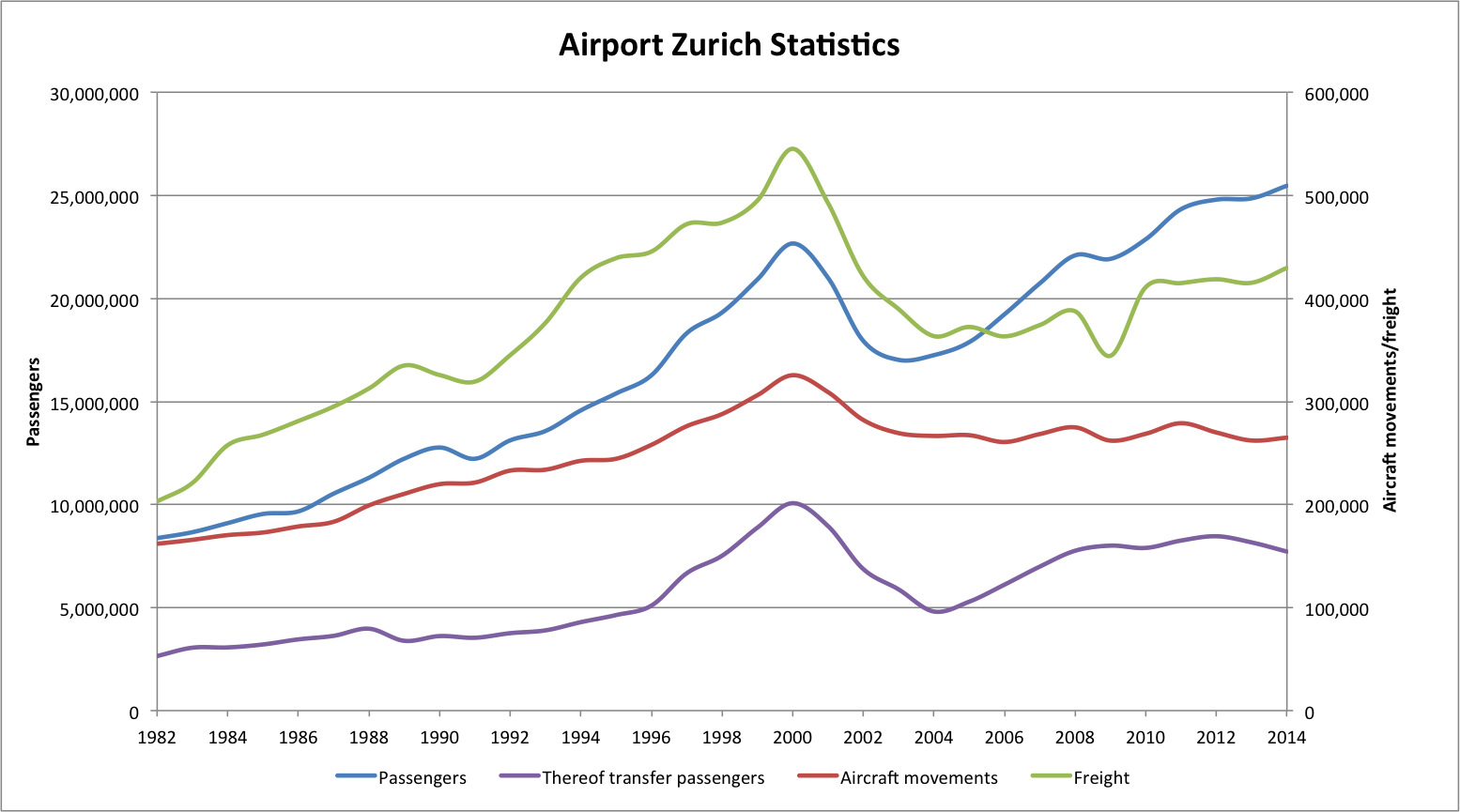
Zurich Airport statistics from 1982 to 2014, including passengers, transfer passengers, flights handled and freight in metric tons

=== Busiest routes ===
Busiest European routes from Zurich Airport (2024)
Rank	City	Passengers
1	London–Heathrow	1,147,298
2	Berlin–Brandenburg	860,821
3	Amsterdam	812,381
8	Madrid	754,631
6	Vienna	746,853
5	Barcelona	724,304
4	Palma de Mallorca	713,449
7	Lisbon	648,505
9	Frankfurt	609,776
10	Hamburg	585,244

Busiest intercontinental routes from Zurich Airport (2024)
Rank	City	Passengers
1	Dubai–International	660,510
2	Bangkok–Suvarnabhumi	434,493
3	New York–JFK	422,005
4	Singapore–Changi	381,056
5	Doha	338,852

=== Top airlines ===
Zurich Airport airlines (2021)
Rank	Airlines	Percentage
1	SWISS	51.7%
2	Edelweiss Air	9.7%
3	Lufthansa	3.0%
4	Chair Airlines	2.7%

=== Passenger development ===
Annual passenger traffic
Year	Passengers	Flight movements	Freight (tonnes)
2001	21,012,871	309,230	492,872
2002	17,948,058	282,154	421,811
2003	17,024,937	269,392	389,843
2004	17,252,906	266,660	363,537
2005	17,884,652	267,363	372,415
2006	19,237,216	260,786	363,325
2007	20,739,113	268,476	374,264
2008	22,099,233	274,991	387,671
2009	21,926,872	262,121	344,415
2010	22,878,251	268,765	411,037
2011	24,337,954	279,001	415,035
2012	24,802,400	270,027	418,751
2013	24,865,138	262,227	415,362
2014	25,477,622	264,970	429,830
2015	26,281,228	265,095	411,780
2016	27,666,428	269,160	433,577
2017	29,396,094	270,453	490,452
2018	31,113,488	278,458	493,222
2019	31,507,692	275,330	451,827
2020	8,341,047	111,328	291,163
2021	10,234,428	132,600	393,062
2022	22,561,132	216,585	422,153
2023	28,885,506	247,456	377,998
2024	31,204,287	261,103	436,032
2025	32,593,966	270,116	440,930

== Ground transportation ==
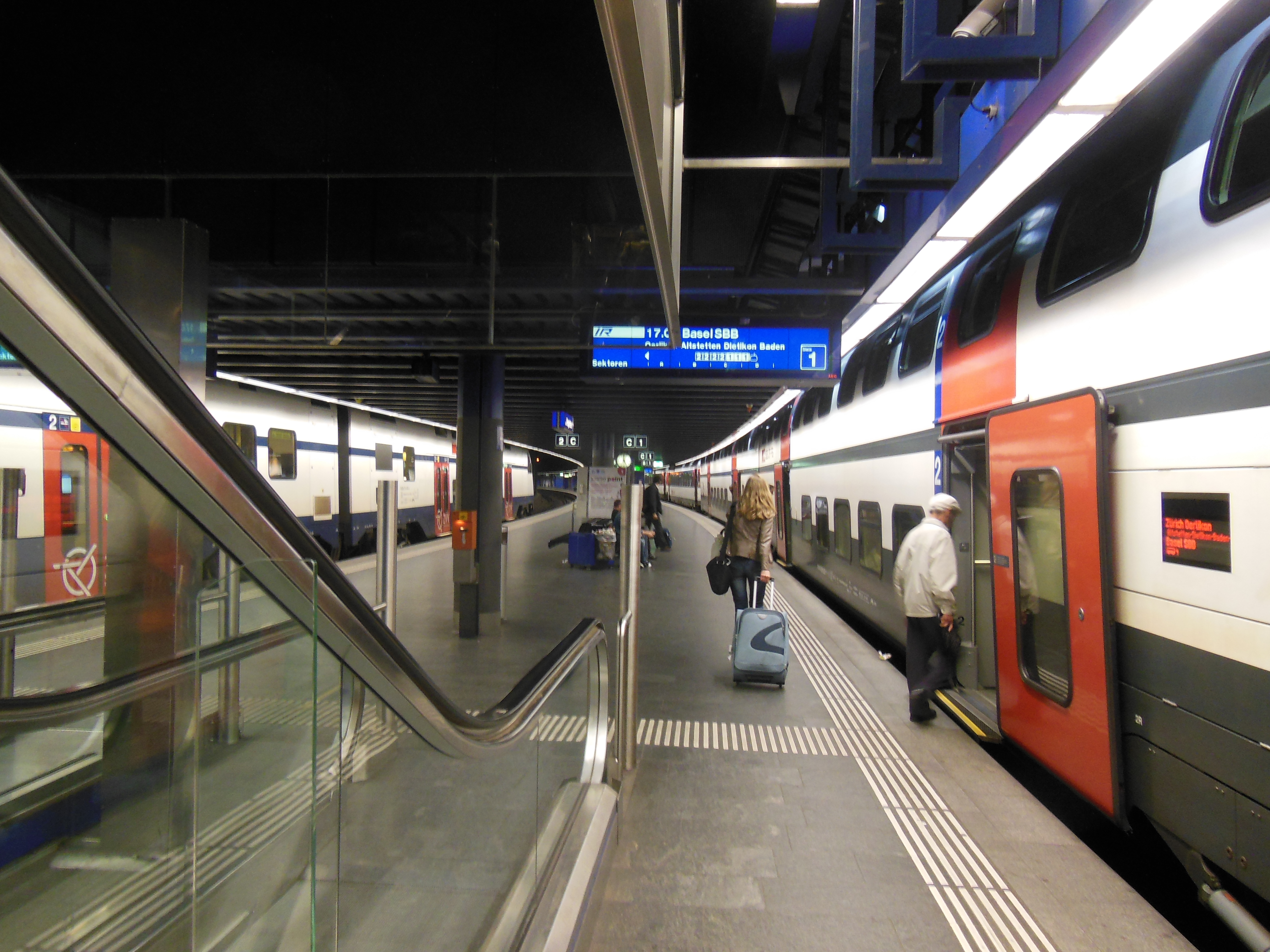
Zürich Flughafen, the airport's railway station

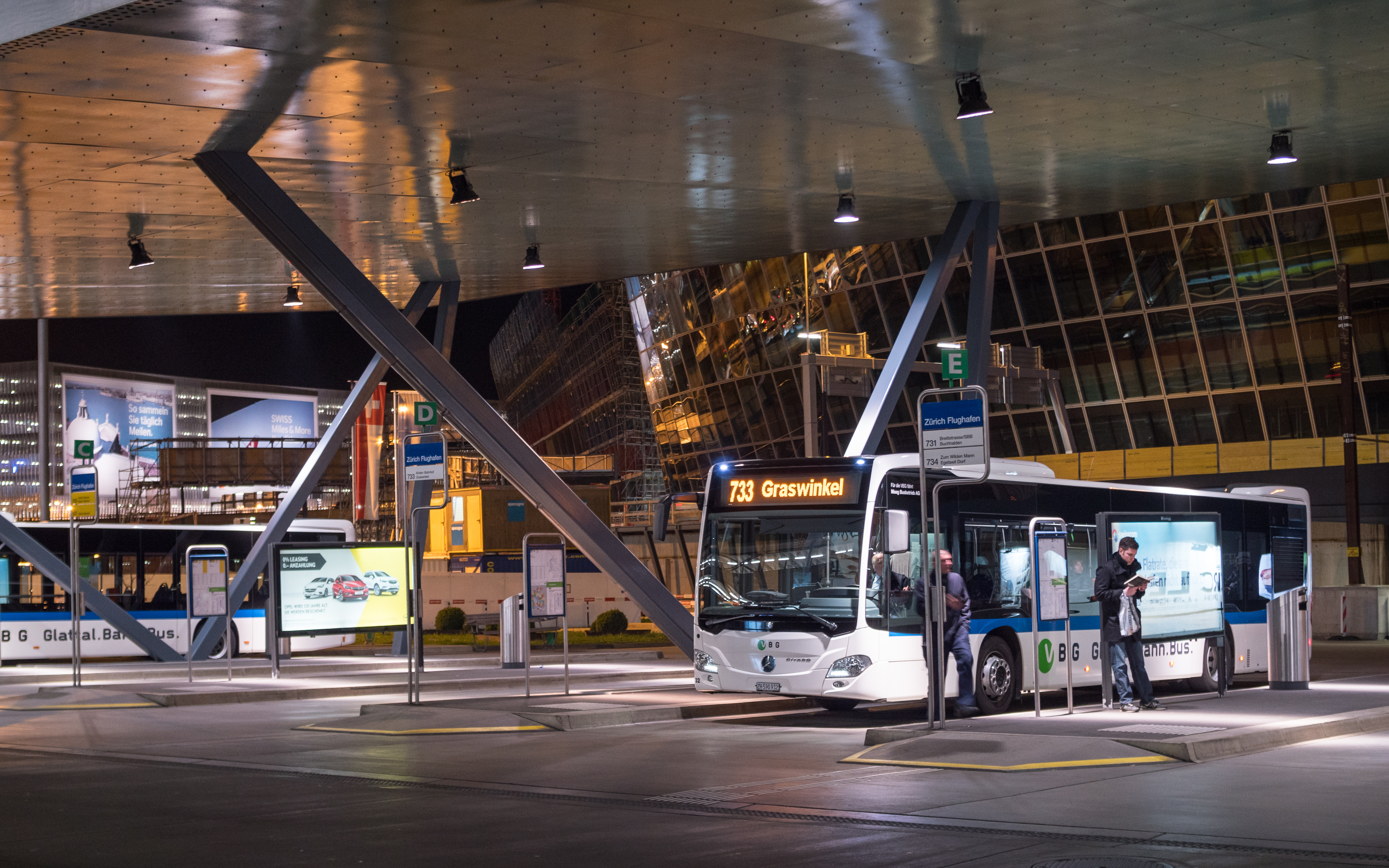
ZRH Bus Terminal

=== Train ===
Zurich Airport railway station is located underneath the Airport Centre. The station has frequent Zurich S-Bahn services, plus direct InterRegio, InterCity, and Eurocity services to places in Switzerland, including Basel, Bern, Biel/Bienne, Brig, Geneva, Lausanne, Lucerne, Romanshorn, St. Gallen, and Winterthur, and some destinations in Austria (Bregenz) and Germany (e.g. Konstanz, Munich). There are some 13 trains per hour to Zürich Hauptbahnhof (Zürich HB), Zurich's main city centre station, with a journey time of between 9 and 13 minutes. By changing trains there, virtually all other places in Switzerland can be reached in a few hours.

=== Bus and tram ===
In front of the Airport Centre is the airport stop of the Stadtbahn Glattal, a light rail system that interworks with the Zurich tram system, together with a regional bus (VBG, PostAuto) station. Both the bus station and light rail stop provide service to destinations throughout the Glattal region that surrounds the airport, with the light rail stop being served by tram routes 10 and 12. Tram route 10 also provides a link to Zurich Hauptbahnhof, albeit with a rather longer journey time than that of the railway.

=== Road ===
The airport is served by the A51 motorway and other main roads, which link to the airport's road network. Drop-off areas are available by the Airport Centre whilst a total of over 14000 spaces are available in six car parks for short and long-term parking. A car hire centre is located in the terminal complex. The airport is served by a fleet of dedicated airport taxis, which operate from taxi ranks in front of the arrival areas. Alternative chauffeur driven airport limousines can be arranged.

The airport can legally be reached by bicycle on a regional highway (Flughafenstrasse and Birchstrasse) that branches off National Highway 4 (Schaffhausen - Bülach - Zurich - Luzern) just east of the airport and reaches northwestern Zurich.

== Other facilities ==
=== The Circle ===
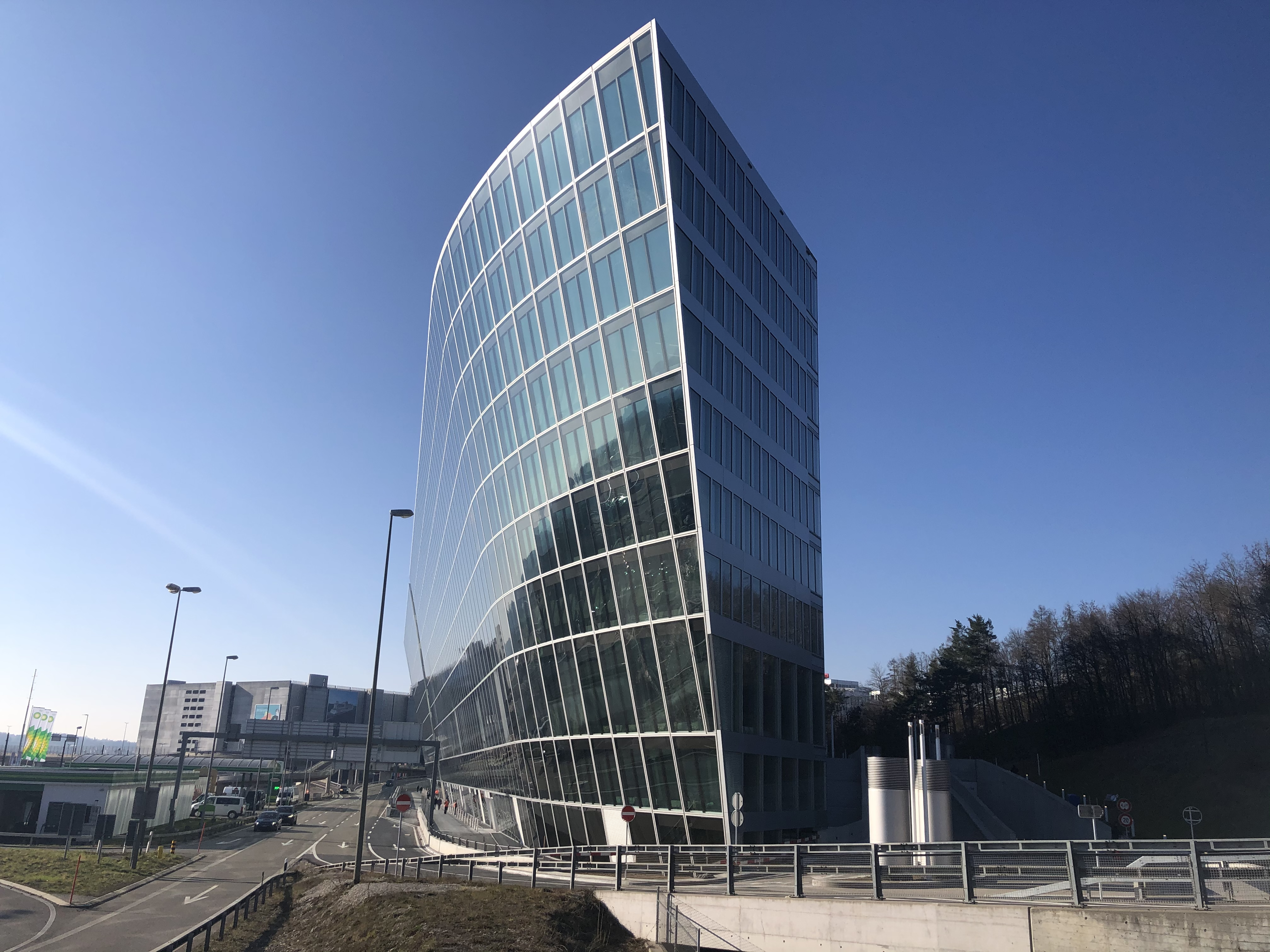
The Circle

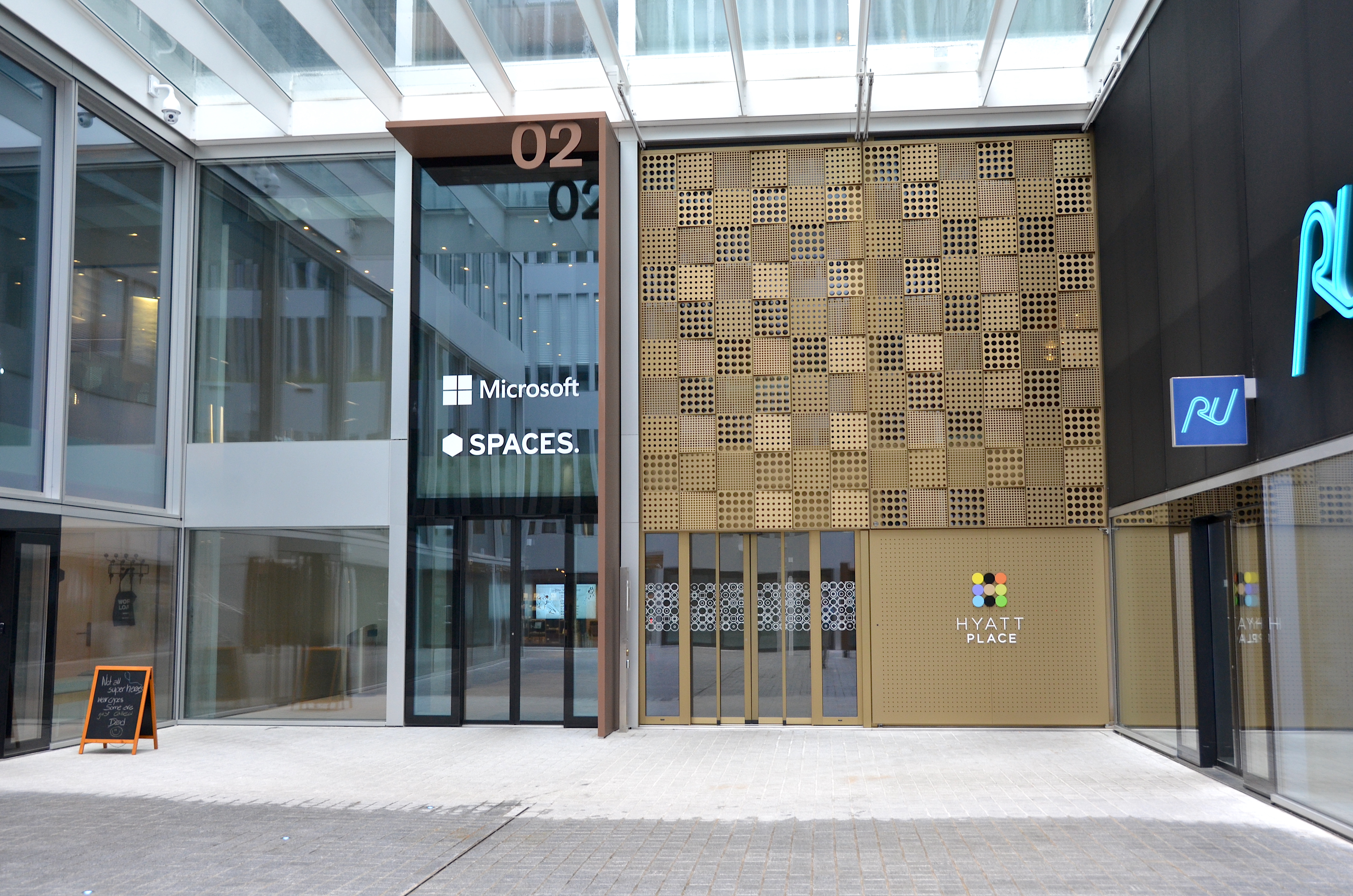
Hyatt, Microsoft and Spaces

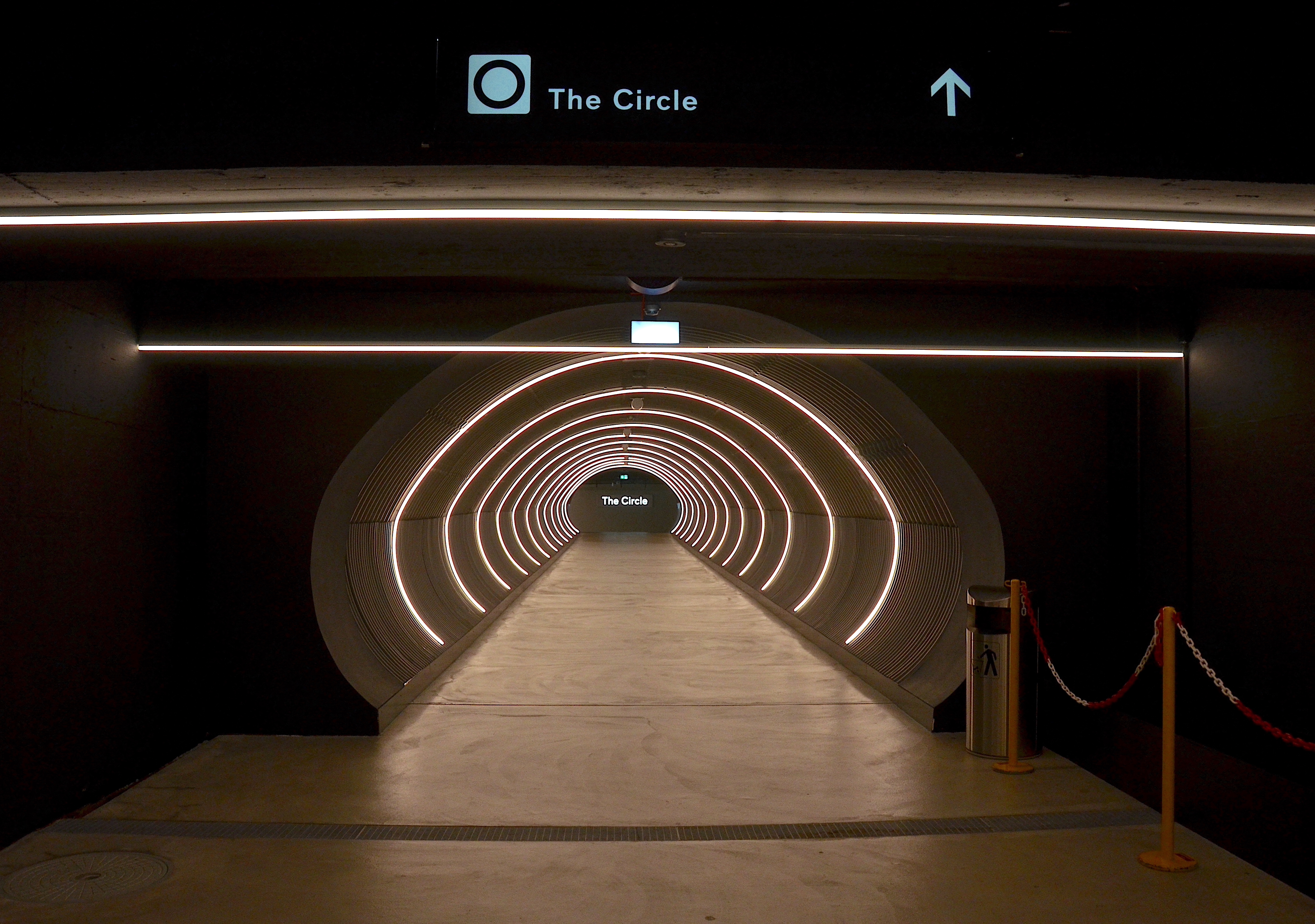
Previous underpass between Terminal and The Circle at Zurich Airport

Opened in 2020, The Circle is a building complex opposite the Airside Center. Located near the terminals and connected to public transportation, it offers 180,000 m^{2} (1,900,000 sq ft) of usable space for shops, a medical center, offices, restaurants, conferences, and hotels.

The hotels and convention areas are operated by the Hyatt Corporation. Prominent tenants include the University Hospital Zurich (USZ), Microsoft, SAP, Novo and MSD. An automated incline elevator operates between the Circle and the airport park.

In February 2009, Flughafen Zürich AG launched a three-stage architectural competition for the development of the 30,000-square-meter site. At the end of October 2011, FZAG submitted the building application to the city of Kloten, which granted construction approval on 6 March 2012. The groundbreaking, originally planned for the end of 2013, was postponed to early 2015, after the first phase of the project received final approval in December 2014. A year earlier, the insurance group Swiss Life had joined the project with a 49% stake. In August 2016, approval was given for the second phase. The total investment volume amounted to around one billion Swiss francs. The foundation stone was laid on 24 March 2017, and the opening took place on 5 November 2020.

The architecture of The Circle was designed by Japanese architect and Pritzker Prize laureate, Riken Yamamoto. Above ground, the route from the airport leads past the bus terminal and tram station to The Circle. Until early 2025, an underground passage connected The Circle with the Airport Shopping area (Level 0). Since 13 January 2025, the passage has been closed due to construction work. Upon completion of the Airport Shopping redevelopment in autumn 2027, a new underground connection between the shopping center and The Circle is planned to open.

Several existing structures were demolished to make way for the development, including Parking Garage 5, the property at Butzenbühlring 13—home since 1969 to the large nightclub AlpenRock House—and Parking Deck 40, which was dismantled for reuse in the expansion of Parking 70 near the maintenance yard.

=== Company headquarters ===
Several companies have their headquarters on or about the airport. These include Swiss International Air Lines, Swiss World Cargo, Swiss AviationTraining, Edelweiss Air, gategroup, Helvetic Airways, Swissôtel, and Rega. Swissair and Crossair were formerly based at the airport.

== Safety and environment ==
=== Airport fire department ===
The airport fire brigade is responsible for fire-fighting at Zurich Airport and is on standby around the clock. In the event of an emergency, the brigade must be able to reach any location on the airport grounds, an area of 880 hectares, in no more than three minutes by international standards. Their vehicles have extremely powerful engines and large-capacity tanks.

The fire service also includes an operations control centre. This not only coordinates the airport's rescue services but also alerts the fire brigades in the northern part of the canton. A total of 77 fire brigades are deployed from the Operations Control Centre, including 2 professional and 13 base fire brigades. Likewise, the rescue service Schutz und Rettung Zürich Nord, the rescue service Spital Bülach, the rescue service Winterthur and since 1 April 2008, the rescue service of the canton of Schaffhausen are also dispatched. Other tasks of the Operations Control Centre include alerting a large animal rescue service, a personal emergency call and location system and the coordination of the emergency medical service for several municipalities.

Until 31 December 2007, the airport fire brigade was officially called the Berufsfeuerwehr Flughafen Zürich (Professional Fire Brigade), and it was constituted as the company fire brigade of Flughafen Zürich AG. On 1 January 2008, the airport fire brigade, together with the rescue service and the operations control centre, was for organizational reasons transferred to the Schutz und Rettung (Protection and Rescue) department of the city of Zurich.

=== Refuelling dispenser, Ramp Safety, Airport Authority and Follow Me ===
In 2014, five companies were licensed for aircraft refuelling at the airport, operating 16 tankers and 28 dispensers.

== Accidents and incidents ==
- On 24 November 1951, a Douglas DC-4 of the Israeli El Al (aircraft registration 4X-ADN) on a cargo flight from Rome with textiles on board crashed into a forest three kilometers northeast of Zurich Airport shortly before landing. Six of the seven crew members were killed.
- On 24 November 1956, an Ilyushin Il-12B of the Czechoslovak airline ČSA (OK-DBP) crashed into an agricultural area 13 kilometres after take-off from Zurich-Kloten airport, only 500 metres from the southern outskirts of Wasterkingen, probably due to engine problems. All 23 passengers and crew members died there.
- On 4 September 1963, Swissair Flight 306 experienced an in-flight fire shortly after take-off and crashed, killing all 80 people on board.
- On 18 February 1969, four armed members of the Popular Front for the Liberation of Palestine attacked El Al flight 432 whilst it prepared for takeoff. The aircraft's security guard repelled the attack, resulting in the death of one of the terrorists, whilst the Boeing 720's co-pilot subsequently died of his injuries.
- On 21 February 1970, a barometrically triggered bomb exploded on Swissair Flight 330 some nine minutes after takeoff from Zurich en route to Tel Aviv and Hong Kong. All 47 occupants were killed. The bombing was attributed to the PFLP-GC.
- On 18 January 1971, an inbound Balkan Bulgarian Airlines Il-18D approached Zurich Airport in fog below the glideslope. It crashed and burst into flames, 0.7 kilometres (0.43 mi) north of the airport, when both the left wingtip and landing gear contacted the ground. Seven crew members and 38 passengers were killed.
- On 24 November 1990, an Alitalia Douglas DC-9 operating Flight 404 crashed on approach to Zurich, killing all 46 passengers and crew on board.
- On 10 January 2000, a Crossair Saab 340 operating Flight 498 crashed shortly after takeoff, killing all 10 occupants. The cause of the crash was determined to have been the result of spatial disorientation and pilot errors.
- On 24 November 2001, a Crossair Avro RJ100 operating Flight 3597 crashed into hills near Bassersdorf while on approach to Zurich. Twenty-four of the 33 people on board were killed.

== See also ==
- Transport in Switzerland
