= Eurico de Aguiar Salles Airport =

Vitória–Eurico de Aguiar Salles International Airport Aeroporto Internacional de Vitória–Eurico de Aguiar Salles
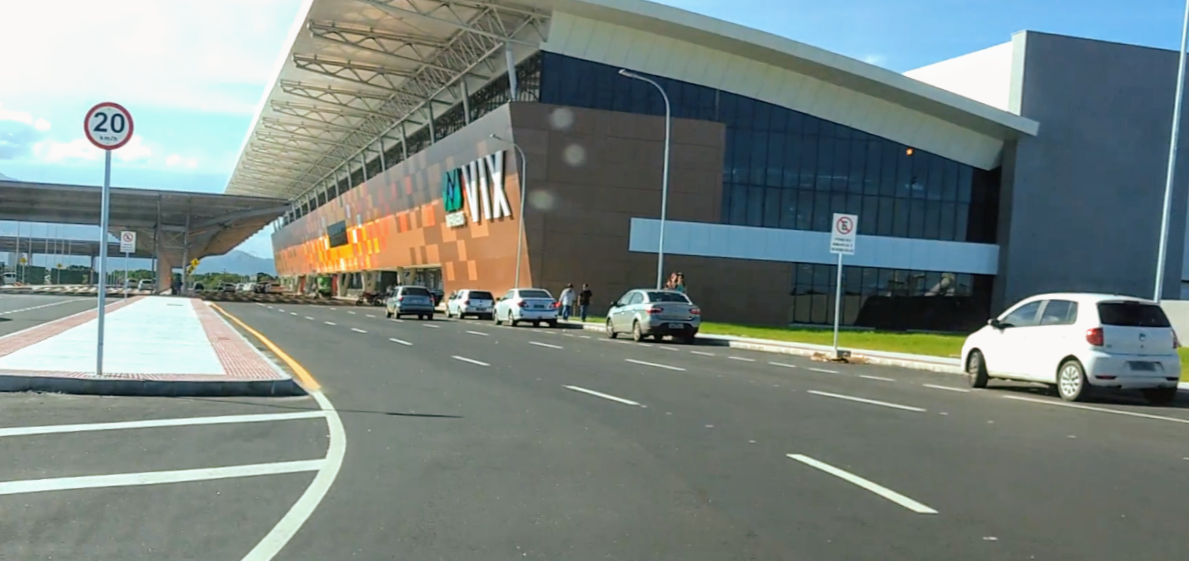
- IATA: VIX; ICAO: SBVT; LID: ES0001

Summary
- Airport type: Public
- Operator: Infraero (1975–2019); Zurich Airport Brasil (2019–present)
- Serves: Vitória
- Focus city for: Gol Linhas Aéreas
- Time zone: BRT (UTC−03:00)
- Elevation AMSL: 10 m (33 ft)
- Coordinates: 20°15′29″S 040°17′11″W
- Website: vitoria-airport.com.br

Map
- Location in Brazil

Runways
Direction	Length		Surface
Direction	m	ft	Surface
06/24	1,750	5,741	Asphalt
02/20	2,058	6,752	Asphalt

Statistics (2025)
- Passengers: 3,640,408 ▲14%
- Aircraft movements: 46,333 ▲1%
- Statistics: Zurich Airport Brasil; Sources: Airport Website, ANAC, DECEA

Vitória–Eurico de Aguiar Salles International Airport (IATA: VIX, ICAO: SBVT), formerly called Goiabeiras Airport after the neighborhood where it is located, is the airport serving Vitória, Brazil. Since 9 May 2006, it is named after Eurico de Aguiar Salles (1910–1959) a local politician, law professor, and Minister of Justice.

It is operated by Zurich Airport Brasil.

== History ==
The airport was built in the 1930s and in 1943 a concrete runway and a passenger terminal were built.

In 2005 renovation works started at the airport. Projects included a passenger terminal located on a second runway and a control tower. The old terminal was converted into an international cargo terminal. The construction costed initially BRL 300 million, was paralyzed several times in 2006 and 2007 leaving construction virtually abandoned and delayed by overpricing and diversion of funds. It was finished in April 2018.

Between 1975 and 2019 it was managed by Infraero. On March 15, 2019 Flughafen Zürich AG won a 30-year concession to operate the airport.

== Airlines and destinations ==
=== Passenger ===
Airlines	Destinations
Azul Brazilian Airlines	Belo Horizonte–Confins, Campinas, Recife
Gol Linhas Aéreas	Brasília, Rio de Janeiro–Galeão, Salvador da Bahia, São Paulo–Congonhas, São Paulo–Guarulhos; Seasonal: Recife
LATAM Brasil	Brasília, Rio de Janeiro–Galeão, São Paulo–Congonhas, São Paulo–Guarulhos; Seasonal: Fortaleza

== Statistics ==
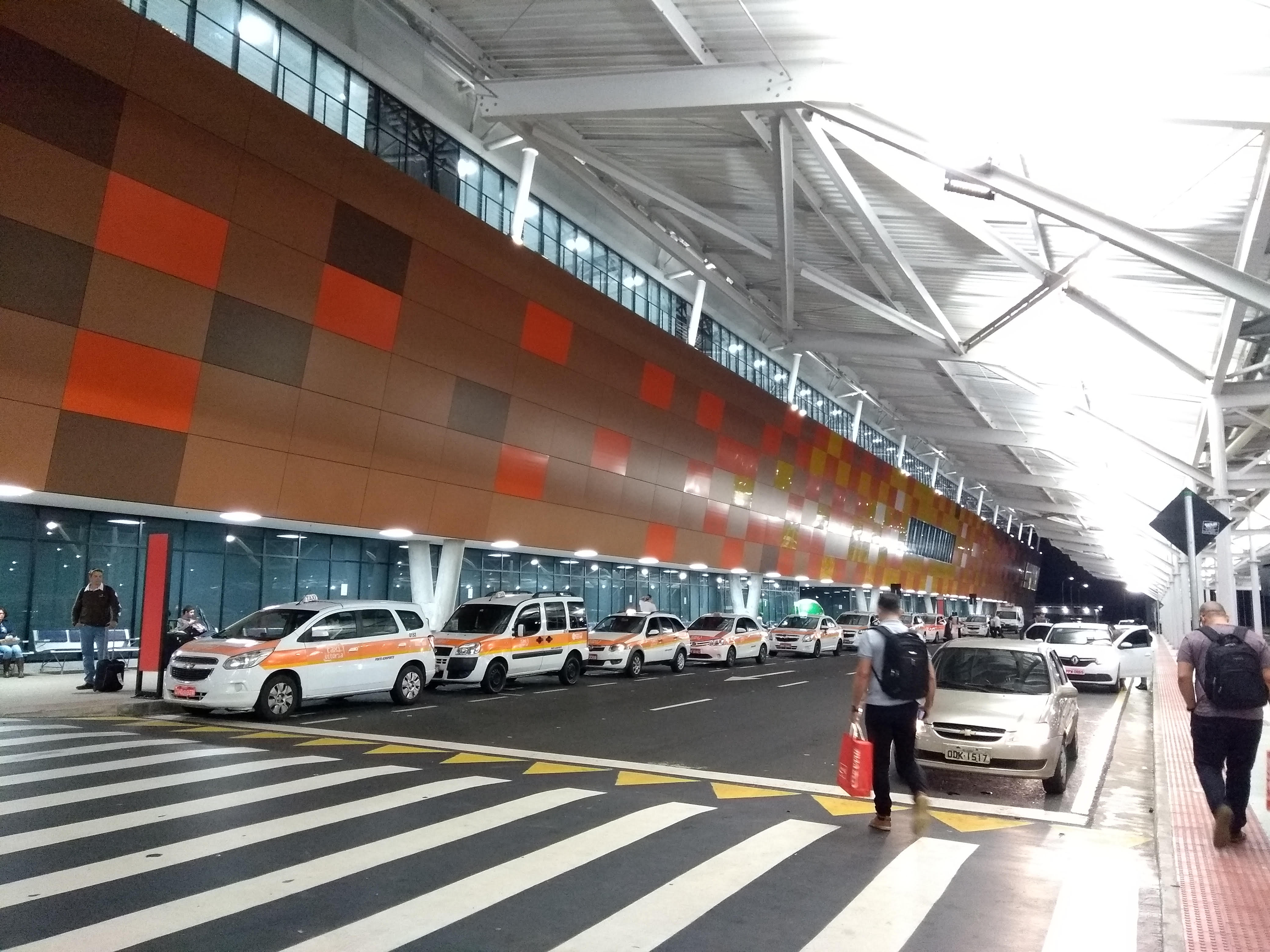
Terminal in 2018

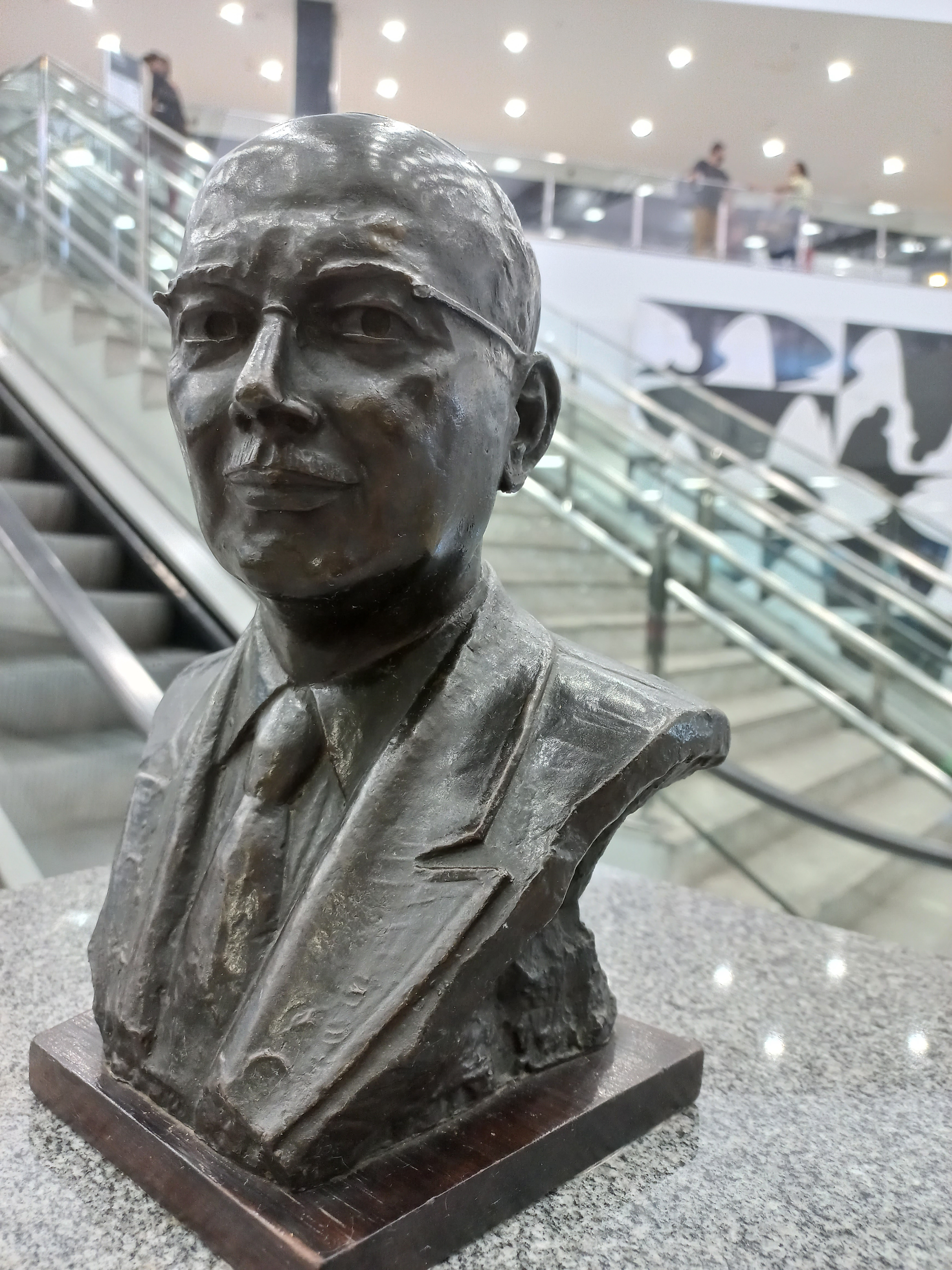
Eurico de Aguiar Salles (1910-1959)

Following are the number of passenger, aircraft and cargo movements at the airport, according to Infraero (2007-2019) and Zurich Airport (2020-2025) reports:

Year	Passenger	Aircraft	Cargo (t)
2025	3,640,408 ▲14%	46,333 ▲1%	
2024	3,186,761 ▼1%	45,747 ▲3%	
2023	3,210,087 ▲20%	44,252 ▲11%	
2022	2,668,534 ▲29%	39,897 ▲23%	
2021	2,068,195 ▲39%	32,497 ▲26%	
2020	1,486,850 ▼55%	25,700 ▼39%	
2019	3,339,405 ▲8%	42,132	18,785 ▼19%
2018	3,096,077 ▲2%	42,324 ▼2%	23,213 ▼16%
2017	3,021,949 ▼3%	43,120 ▼8%	27,698 ▲43%
2016	3,120,166 ▼13%	46,737 ▼20%	19,317 ▲2%
2015	3,583,875 ▲2%	58,760 ▼2%	18,932 ▲34%
2014	3,522,674 ▲2%	60,144 ▲3%	14,170 ▲12%
2013	3,450,736 ▼5%	58,504 ▼8%	12,662 ▲4%
2012	3,642,842 ▲14%	63,777 ▲11%	12,155 ▼10%
2011	3,182,394 ▲20%	57,293 ▲7%	13,478 ▲21%
2010	2,644,729 ▲13%	53,360 ▲7%	11,121 ▲11%
2009	2,342,283 ▲18%	49,807 ▲19%	9,995 ▼33%
2008	1,988,447 ▲5%	41,936 ▲5%	14,852 ▼1%
2007	1,894,540	39,778	15,073

== Accidents and incidents ==
- 19 December 1949: an Aerovias Brasil Douglas C-47A-30-DK Dakota III registration PP-AXG, disappeared when on a training flight after taking-off from Vitória. It probably crashed at sea. All 6 passengers and crew died.
- 3 April 1955: an Itaú Curtiss C-46A-60-CK Commando registration PP-ITG struck a hill 2 miles short of the runway while on an instrument approach to Vitória. The crew of 3 died.
- 9 May 1962: a Cruzeiro do Sul Convair 240-D registration PP-CEZ on final approach to Vitória struck a tree at a height of 40m, 1,860m short of the runway. It should have been at 150m. Of the 31 passengers and crew aboard, 28 died.

== Access ==
The airport is located 10 km (6 mi) from downtown Vitória.

== See also ==
- List of airports in Brazil
