= Macaé Airport =

Airport serving Macaé, Brazil

Joaquim de Azevedo Mancebo Airport Aeroporto Joaquim de Azevedo Mancebo
- IATA: MEA; ICAO: SBME; LID: RJ0004

Summary
- Airport type: Public
- Operator: ARSA (1981–1987); Infraero (1987–2019); Zurich Airport Brasil (2019–present)
- Serves: Macaé
- Time zone: BRT (UTC−03:00)
- Elevation AMSL: 3 m (9.8 ft)
- Coordinates: 22°20′30″S 041°45′58″W
- Website: macae-airport.com

Map
- Location in Brazil MEA (Brazil)

Runways
| Direction | Length | | Surface |
| Direction | m | ft | Surface |
|---|---|---|---|
| 06/24 | 899 | 2,949 | Asphalt |
| 05/23 | 1,410 | 4,626 | Asphalt |

Statistics (2025)
- Passengers: 217,304 ▲1%
- Aircraft Operations: 26,317
- Statistics: Zurich Airport Brasil; Sources: Airport Website, ANAC, DECEA

Joaquim de Azevedo Mancebo Airport (IATA: MEA, ICAO: SBME) is the airport serving Macaé, Brazil. The airport is named after the founder of the local air club.

It is operated by Zurich Airport Brasil.

== History ==
The airport was established in the 1960s as an airfield for general aviation and a flying club. In the 1980s the runway was paved and an apron and a terminal with 941 m² were constructed, enabling Macaé Airport to fully support the operations related to the Campos basin. In fact, most of its movement (98%) is related to helicopter flights to/from offshore oil platforms of the Campos basin. Its apron has 6 positions for fixed-wing aircraft and 38 positions for rotorcrafts.

Previously operated by Infraero, on March 15, 2019 Flughafen Zürich AG won a 30-year concession to operate the airport.

On June 1, 2022 the name of the airport was officially changed from Benedito Lacerda to Joaquim de Azevedo Mancebo (1924–1973), celebrating the founder of the local air club.

On June 1, 2023 operations of aircraft was severely restricted, due to major renovation works which included the runway. On June 17, 2025 the second runway was opened and restrictions were lifted.

== Airlines and destinations ==
| Airlines | Destinations |
|---|---|
| LATAM Brasil | São Paulo–Guarulhos (begins 15 February 2027) |

== Access ==
The airport is located 6 km (4 mi) from downtown Macaé.

== See also ==
- List of airports in Brazil
