= List of Embraer EMB 110 Bandeirante operators =

The following are civil and military operators of the Embraer EMB 110 Bandeirante:

== Civil operators ==
In August 2008 a total of 122 EMB 110 aircraft (all variants) were in airline service worldwide with some 45 airlines. Major operators include:

Australia

- Aeropelican (1)
- King Island Airlines (1)

Bahamas

- Pineapple Air (1)

Brazil

- Abaeté Linhas Aéreas (6)
- Manaus Aerotáxi
- Táxi Aéreo Weiss

Canada

- Aeropro (2)
- Kenn Borek Air (1)

Cook Islands

- Air Rarotonga (3)

Cuba

- Aerocaribbean (4)

Curaçao

- Insel Air (3) (Retired)

Fiji

- Northern Air (Fiji)

Guatemala

- Transportes Aéreos Guatemaltecos (6)

Ghana

- Aberdair Aviation (1)

Honduras

- CM Airlines(7)

Ireland

- Ryanair (1)

Kenya

- Aberdair Aviation (3)

New Zealand

- Eagle Airways

Norway

- Teddy Air (1)

United Kingdom

- Air UK
- Genair

- Jersey European Airways

- SkyDrift Air Charter (1)

United States

- AirNow (9)
- Air Sunshine (2)
- Arctic Circle Air (3)
- Royal Air Freight (5)
- Special Aviation Systems (4)
- Tropical Air Transport (1)
- Wiggins Airways (7)

Venezuela

- Rutaca (5)

Iran

- Payam Air (5) (4 stored)

Historically, a number of commuter airlines in the U.S. and elsewhere operated the EMB 110 in scheduled passenger airline operations.

== Military operators ==
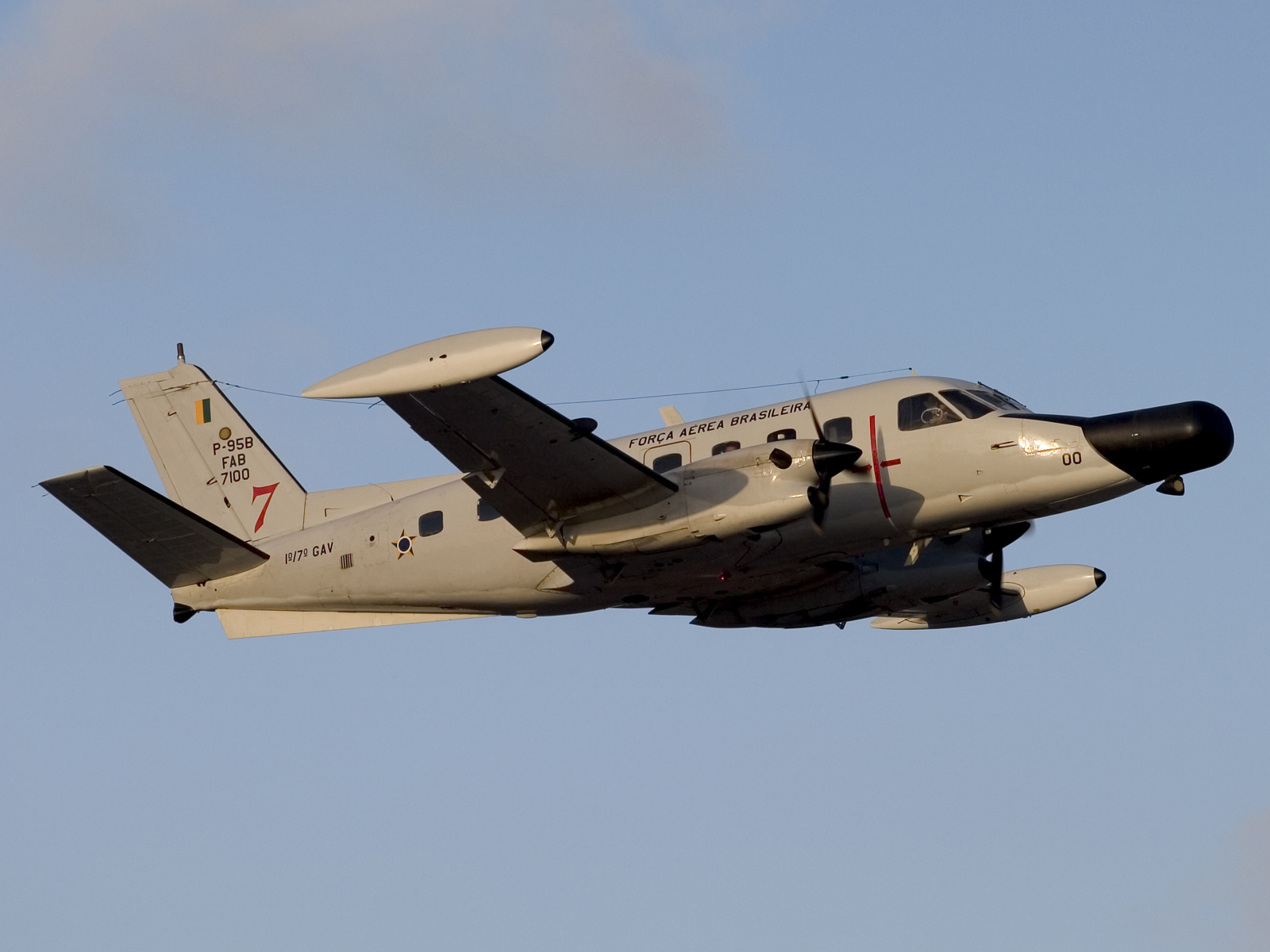
Brazilian Air Force Embraer P-95B Bandeirulha (EMB-111A)

- EMB 100

Brazil
Brazilian Air Force - former operator.

- EMB 110

Angola
National Air Force of Angola
Brazil
Brazilian Air Force Operates 104 aircraft.
Cape Verde
Military of Cape Verde
Chile
Chilean Navy Operates five aircraft.
Colombia
Colombian Aerospace Force Operates two aircraft.
Gabon
Guyana

- Guyana Defence Force - former operator.

Uruguay
The Uruguayan Air Force operated a total number of six Bandeirante aircraft. Five C-95s and one R-95. The C-95s were identified as FAU 580, FAU 581, FAU 582, FAU 583 and FAU 584. The R-95 received the registration FAU 585. The FAU 581, 583 and 584 were lost in accidents, and the R-95, the only Bandeirante that today remains in service with the Uruguayan Air Force, was one of the only two ever produced.

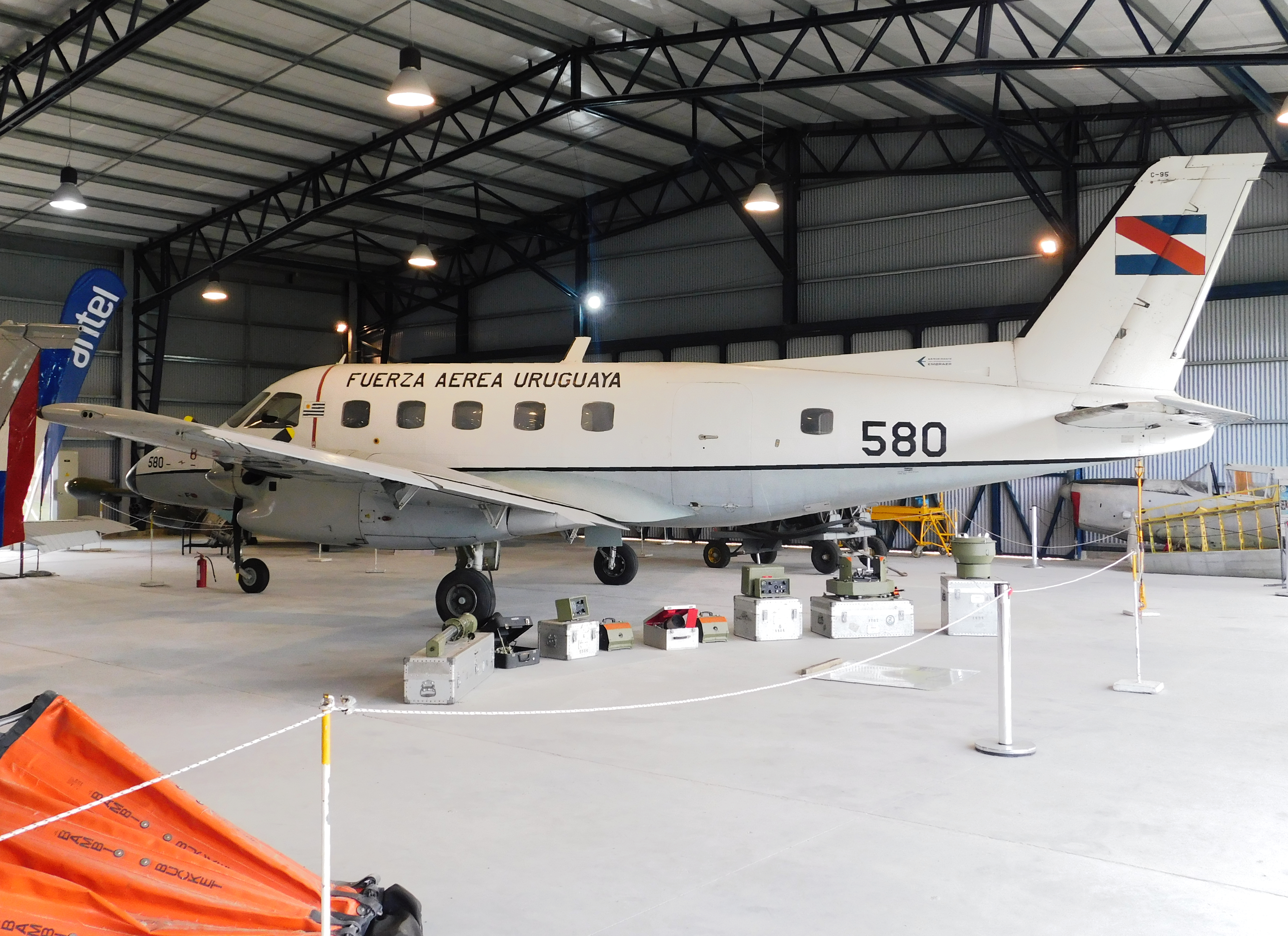
Uruguayan Air Force Embraer C-95 Bandeirante (FAU 580). This particular aircraft, now on display at the "Cnel (Av.) Jaime Meregalli" aviation museum in Canelones, Uruguay, was the first aircraft exported by Embraer.

- EMB 111

Angola
National Air Force of Angola
Argentina
Argentine Navy - leased by naval aviation during the Falklands War
Brazil
Brazilian Air Force
Chile
Chilean Navy
Senegal
Senegalese Air Force
