= Tabatinga International Airport =

Tabatinga International Airport Aeroporto Internacional de Tabatinga
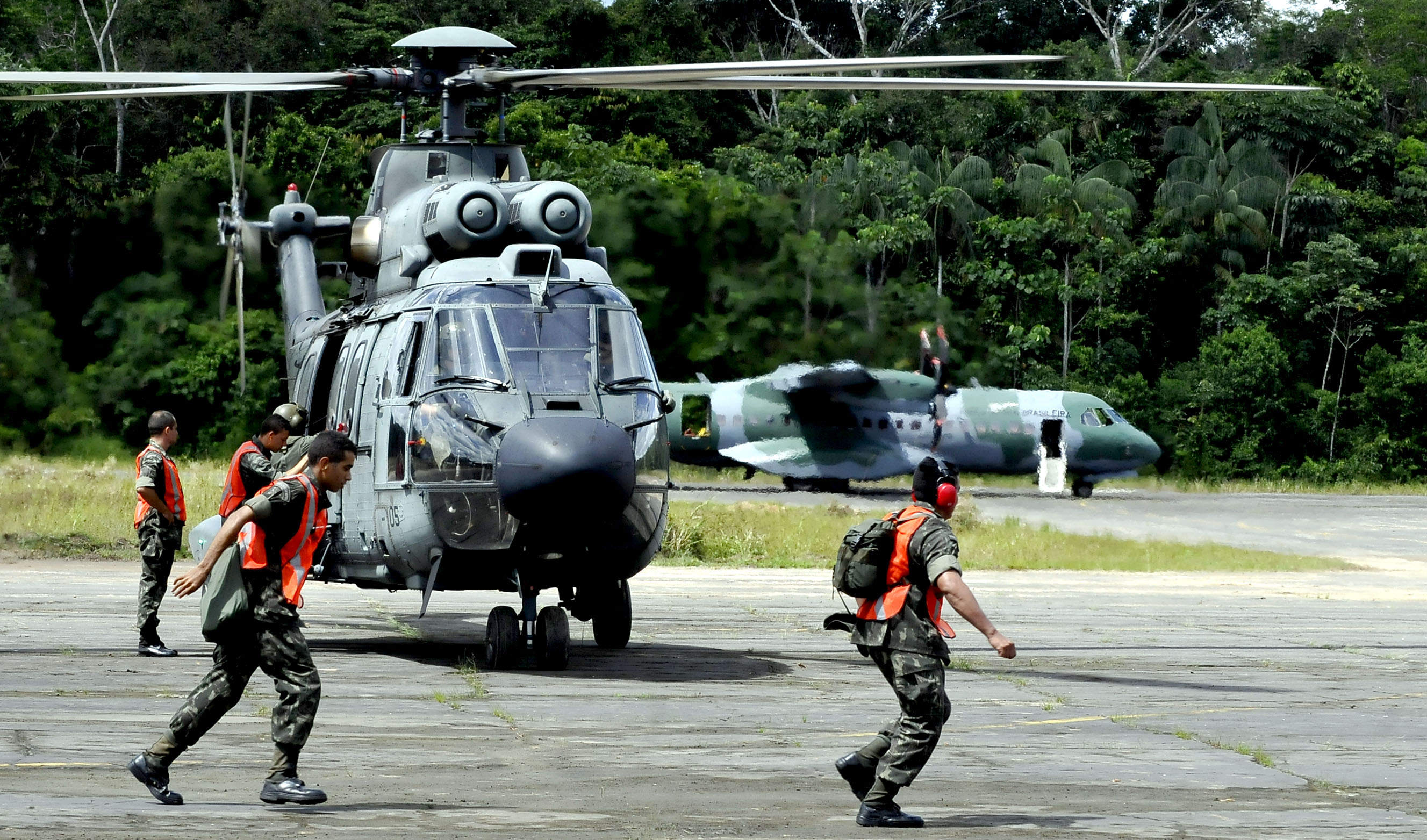
- IATA: TBT; ICAO: SBTT; LID: AM0005

Summary
- Airport type: Public
- Operator: Infraero (1980–2021); Vinci (2021–present)
- Serves: Tabatinga
- Time zone: BRT−2 (UTC−05:00)
- Elevation AMSL: 80 m (260 ft)
- Coordinates: 04°15′02″S 069°56′16″W
- Website: www.tabatinga-airport.com.br

Map
- Location in Brazil

Runways
Direction	Length		Surface
Direction	m	ft	Surface
12/30	2,150	7,054	Asphalt

Statistics (2025)
- Passengers: 90,160 ▲41%
- Aircraft Operations: 3,964 ▲21%
- Statistics: Vinci; Sources: Airport Website, ANAC, DECEA

Tabatinga International Airport (IATA: TBT, ICAO: SBTT) is the airport serving Tabatinga, Brazil.

It is operated by Vinci SA.

== History ==
Previously operated by Infraero, on 7 April 2021 Vinci SA won a 30-year concession to operate the airport.

== Airlines and destinations ==
Airlines	Destinations
Azul Brazilian Airlines	Manaus, Tefé

== Access ==
The airport is located 1 km (1 mi) from downtown Tabatinga.

== Accidents and incidents ==
- 12 June 1982: a TABA Fairchild Hiller FH-227 registration PT-LBV en route from Eirunepé to Tabatinga while on approach to Tabatinga collided with a pole in poor visibility and crashed onto a parking lot. All 40 passengers and 4 crew died.
- 29 October 2009: a Brazilian Air Force Cessna 208 Caravan registration FAB-2725 en route from Cruzeiro do Sul to Tabatinga made an emergency landing on a river due engine failure. Of the 11 occupants, 1 passenger and 1 crew member died.

== See also ==
- List of airports in Brazil
