= SWEI =

SWEI may refer to:

- Shear-wave elasticity imaging
- SWEI, the ICAO code for Eirunepé Airport, Brazil
