= 1982 TABA Fairchild FH-227 accident =

Aviation incident in Brazil

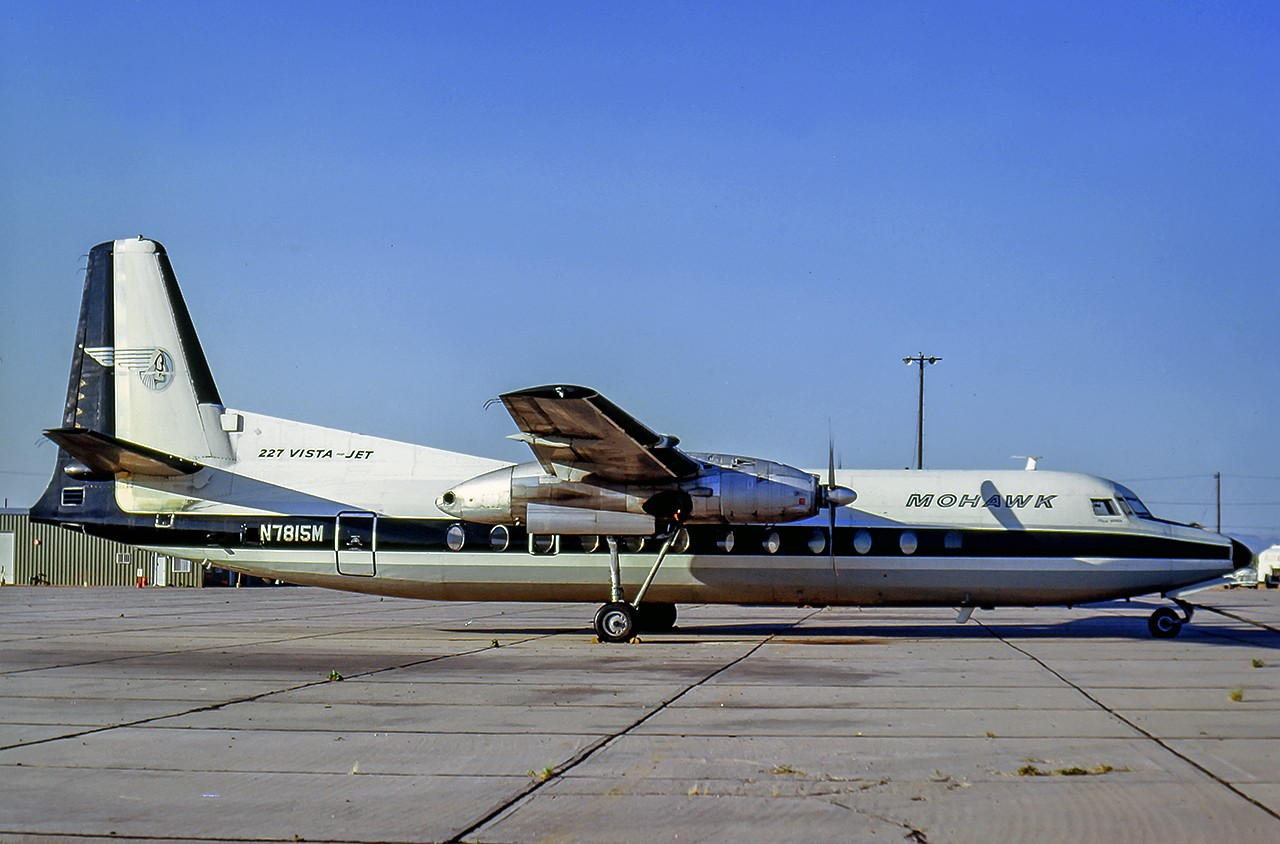
- The aircraft involved in the accident in 1973 while still in service with Mohawk Airlines

Accident
- Date: 12 June 1982
- Summary: Hit obstacle during approach in bad weather
- Site: Tabatinga International Airport, Brazil; 4.2497°S 69.9397°W

Aircraft
- Aircraft type: Fairchild FH-227B
- Operator: Transportes Aéreos Regionais da Bacia Amazônica
- Registration: PT-LBV
- Flight origin: Eirunepé Airport, Eirunepé, Brazil
- Destination: Tabatinga International Airport, Tabatinga, Brazil
- Passengers: 40
- Crew: 4
- Fatalities: 44
- Survivors: 0

The TABA Fairchild FH-227 accident happened on 12 June 1982 when a twin-engined Fairchild FH-227B (registered in Brazil as PT-LBV) on an internal scheduled passenger flight from Eirunepé Airport to Tabatinga International Airport crashed in bad weather. On approach to land at Tabatinga, the aircraft hit a lighting tower and crashed into a car park; the aircraft exploded and burned, and all 44 on board were killed, resulting as TABA's worst aviation disaster.

== Aircraft ==
The aircraft was a Fairchild FH-227B twin-engined turboprop that had been built in the United States in 1967 for Mohawk Airlines. After a number of owners it was bought by TABA in June 1981.
