= Flight 121 =

Flight 121 may refer to the following accidents involving commercial airliners:

Listed chronologically

- Pan Am Flight 121, crashed on 18 June 1947
- Mohawk Airlines Flight 121, crashed on 2 July 1963
- Air Fiji Flight 121, crashed on 24 July 1999

== Other uses ==
- Pacific Air Flight 121, working title of the 2006 movie Snakes on a Plane
- South Pacific Airlines Flight 121, a fictional flight in the 2006 movie Snakes on a Plane

== See also ==
- STS-121, a successful Space Shuttle mission in June–July 2006
