= Altamira Airport =

Altamira Airport Aeroporto de Altamira
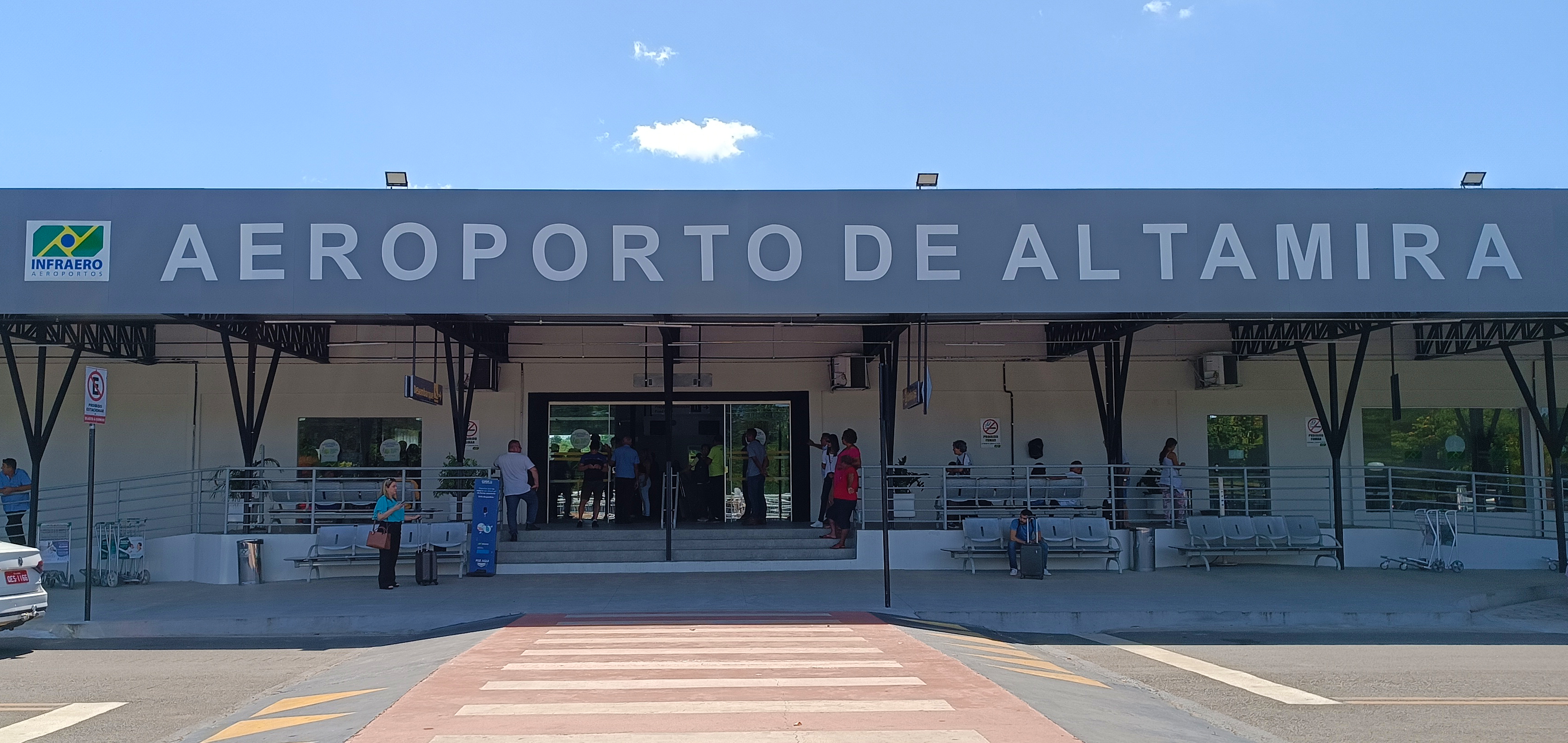
- IATA: ATM; ICAO: SBHT; LID: PA0003

Summary
- Airport type: Public
- Operator: Infraero (1980–2022); AENA (2022–present)
- Serves: Altamira
- Time zone: BRT (UTC−03:00)
- Elevation AMSL: 112 m (367 ft)
- Coordinates: 03°15′03″S 052°15′08″W

Map
- Location in Brazil ATM (Brazil)

Runways
Direction	Length		Surface
Direction	m	ft	Surface
07/25	2,003	6,572	Asphalt

Statistics (2025)
- Passengers: 87,518 ▼15%
- Aircraft Operations: 2,363 ▼10%
- Metric tonnes of cargo: 103 ▼62%
- Statistics: AENA; Sources: ANAC, DECEA

Altamira Airport (IATA: ATM, ICAO: SBHT) is the airport serving Altamira, Brazil.

It is operated by AENA.

== History ==
The airport was commissioned in 1979.

Due to the construction of nearby Belo Monte Dam, Altamira Airport underwent a major renovation, including the extension of the runway, and enlargement of the apron and passenger terminal. The renovation began by the end of 2011.

Previously operated by Infraero, on August 18, 2022, the consortium AENA won a 30-year concession to operate the airport.

== Airlines and destinations ==
Airlines	Destinations
Azul Brazilian Airlines	Belém

== Accidents and incidents ==
- 6 June 1990: a TABA Fairchild Hiller FH-227 registration PT-ICA flying from Belém to Altamira, while on approach to land under fog at Altamira, descended below the approach path, collided with trees and crashed 850m short of the runway. Of the 41 passengers and crew, 23 died.
- 25 January 1993: a TABA Fairchild Hiller FH-227 registration PT-LCS operating a cargo flight from Belém-Val de Cans to Altamira crashed into the jungle near Altamira during night-time approach procedures. The crew of 3 died.

== Access ==
The airport is located 7 km (4 mi) from downtown Altamira.

== Gallery ==
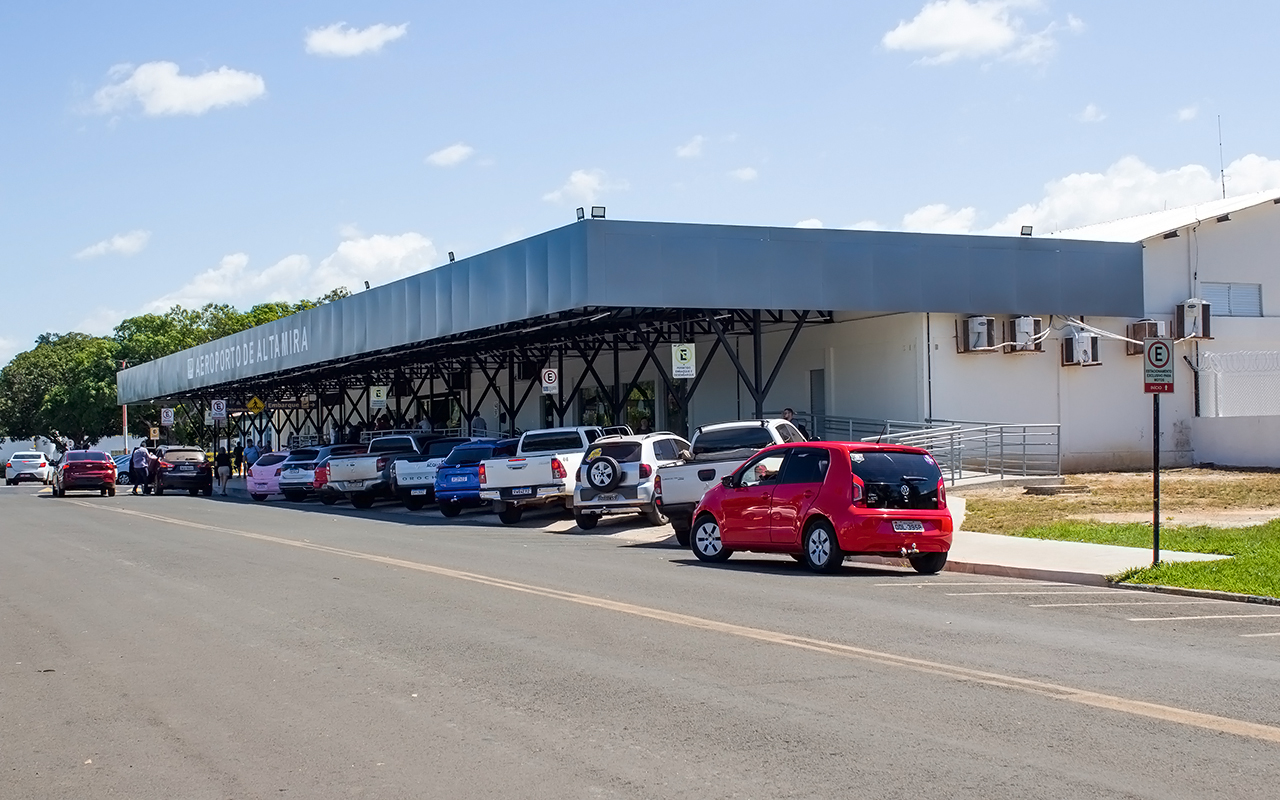

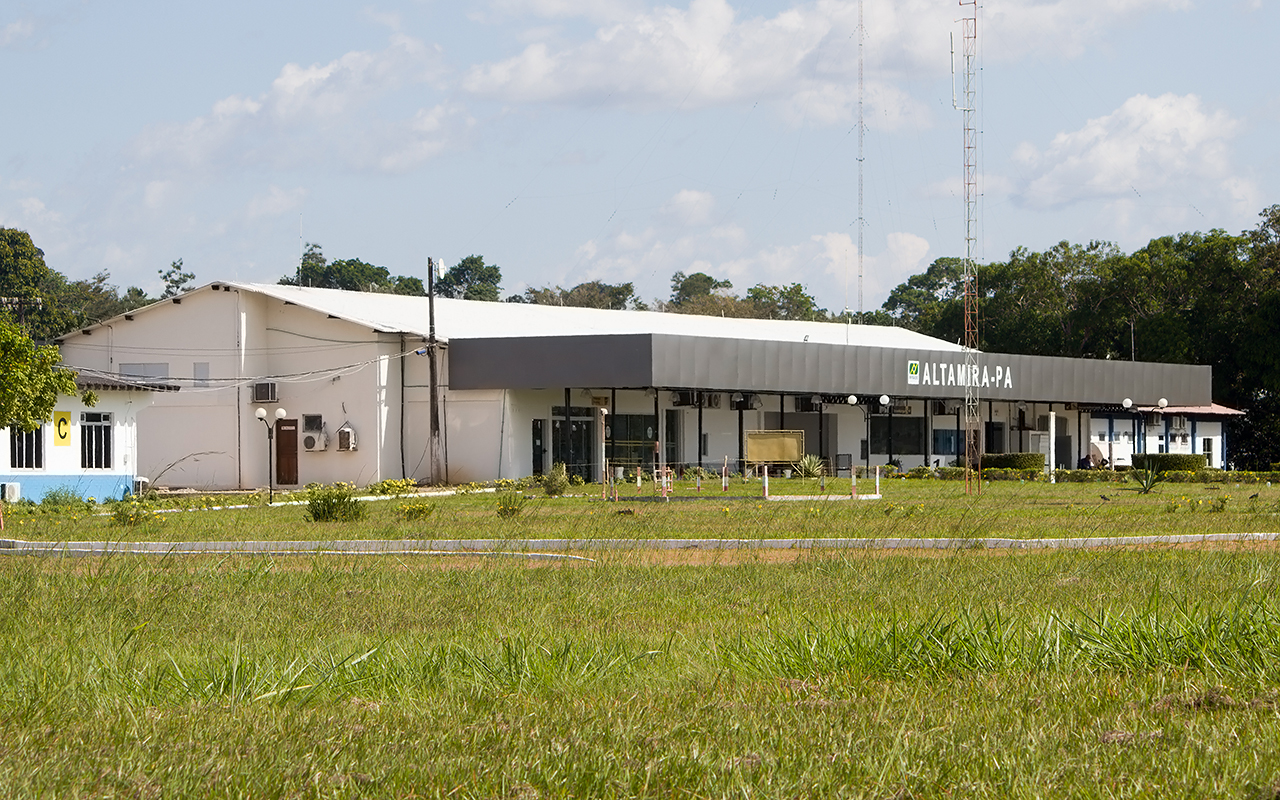

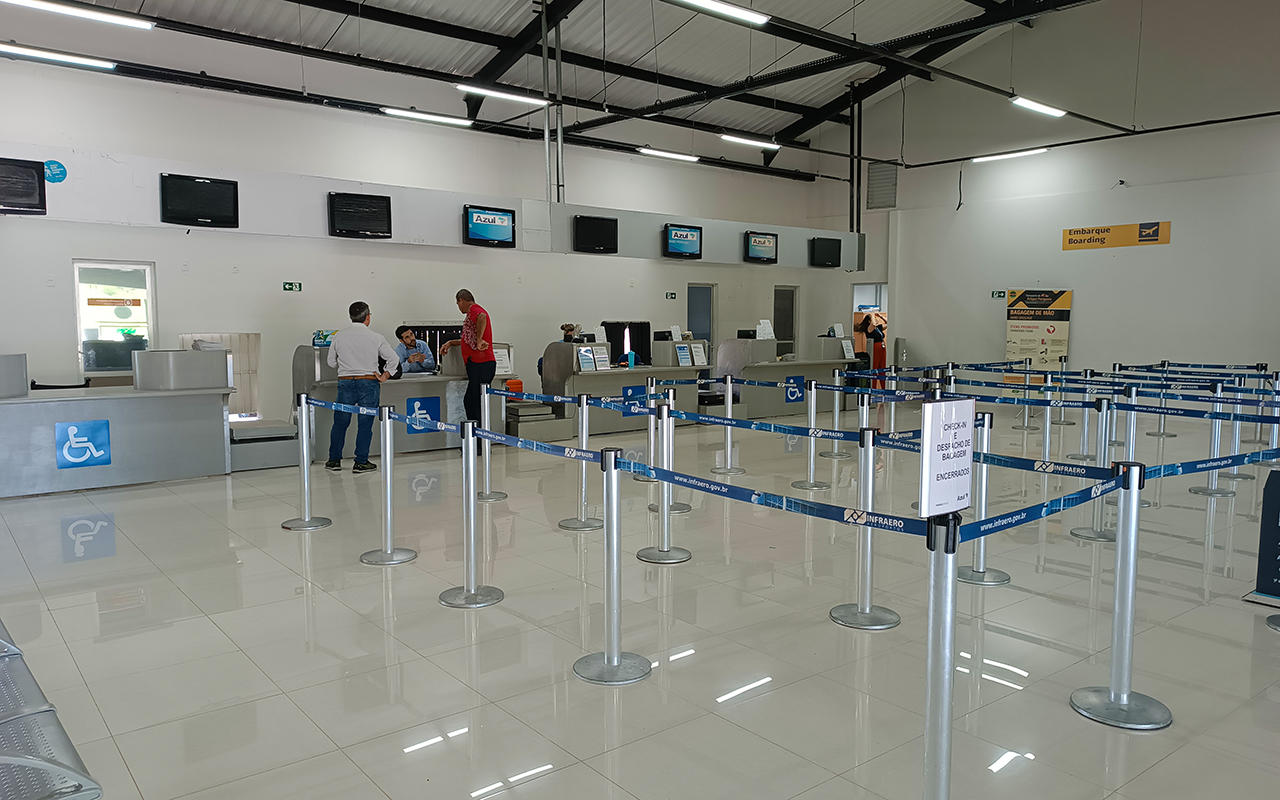

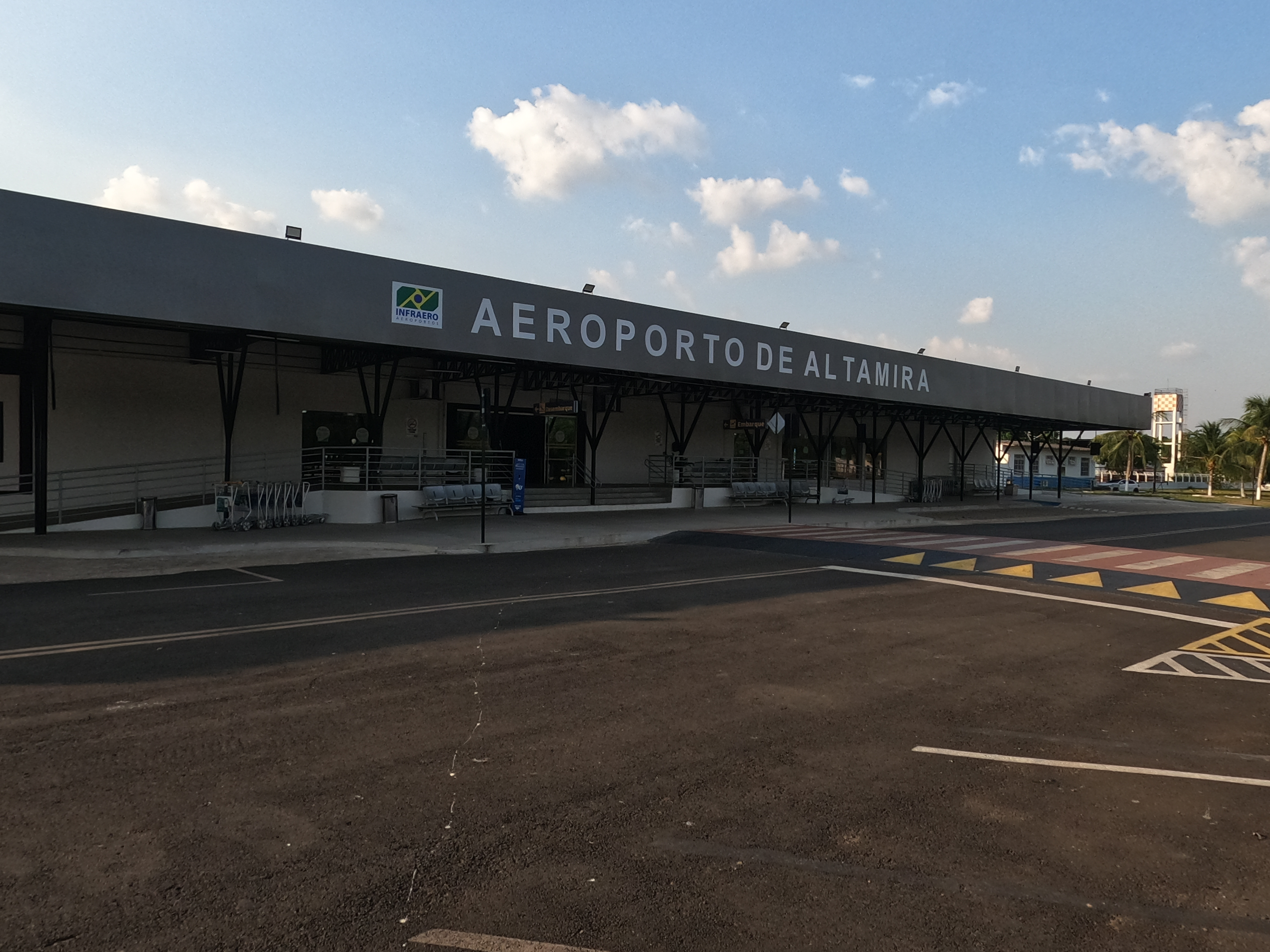

== See also ==
- List of airports in Brazil
