= EuroAir =

Greek airline

IATA	ICAO	Call sign
6M	EUP	EUROSTAR
- Founded: 1995
- Ceased operations: 2009
- Hubs: Athens International Airport
- Fleet size: 0
- Headquarters: Athens, Greece
- Website: http://www.euroair.gr/

EuroAir was an airline based in Athens, Greece, which operated business charter flights using its own and wet leased aircraft. Its main base was Athens International Airport. It ceased operations when its air operator's certificate (AOC) was suspended on 16 March 2009.

== History ==
EuroAir began in 1995, providing air taxi, charter flights, helicopter flights and air ambulance services until its AOC suspension on 16 March 2009.

== Destinations ==
In 2007, EuroAir operated an MD-83 on behalf of On Air (Pescara), a twice-weekly service from Pescara to Brussels Charleroi, Bucharest, Heraklion, Paris CDG and Split.

== Fleet ==
EuroAir owned two McDonnell Douglas MD-83s, a Let L-410 Turbolet and an Embraer EMB-110.
