= 1984 TAM Transportes Aéreos Regionais Embraer EMB 110 crash =

1984 aviation accident in Brazil

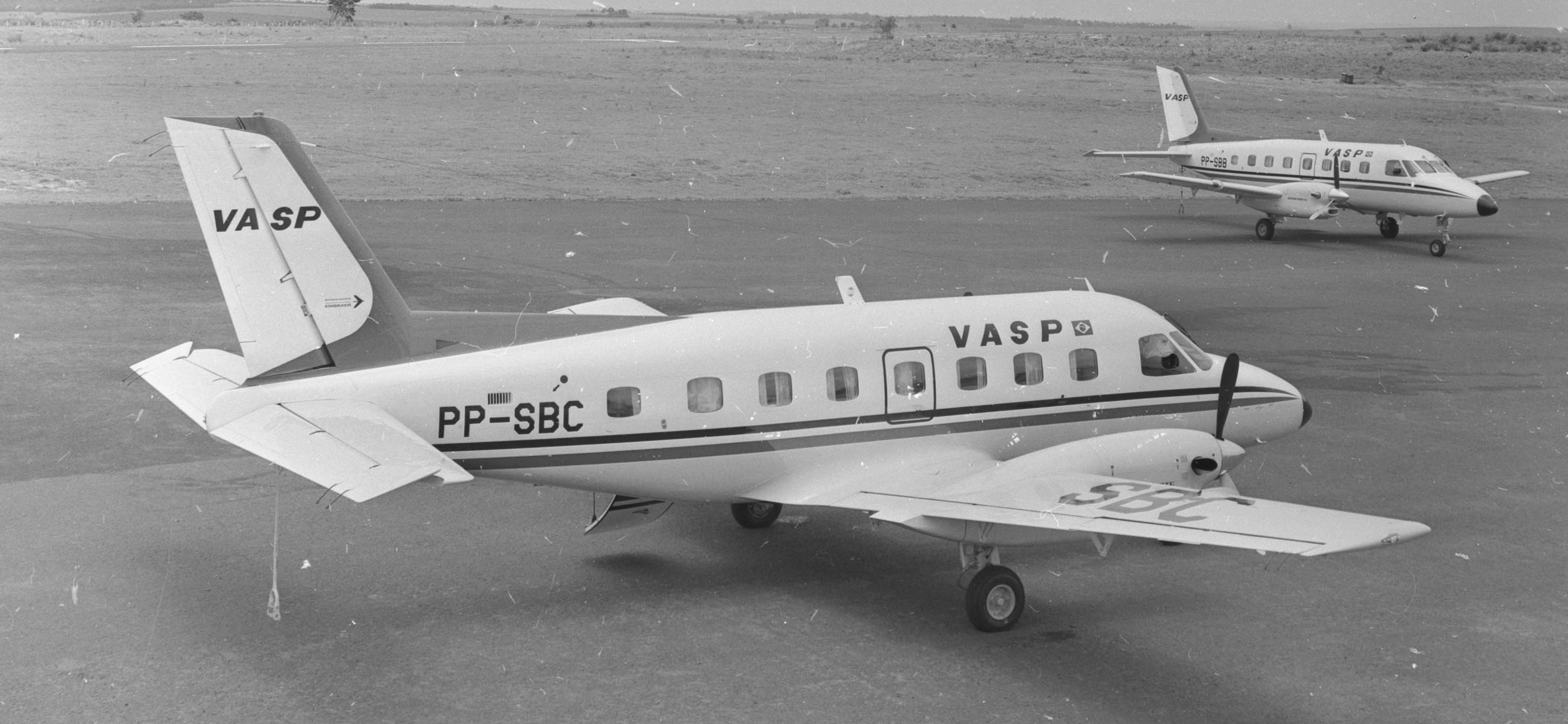
- PP-SBC, the aircraft involved in the accident, while still in service with VASP in 1974

Accident
- Date: 28 June 1984
- Summary: Controlled flight into terrain
- Site: São Pedro da Aldeia; 22.53654°S 42.031815°W

Aircraft
- Aircraft type: Embraer EMB-110 Bandeirante
- Operator: TAM – Transportes Aéreos Regionais
- Registration: PP-SBC
- Flight origin: Rio de Janeiro/Galeão International Airport, Rio de Janeiro, Brazil
- Destination: Macaé Airport, Macaé, Brazil
- Passengers: 16
- Crew: 2
- Fatalities: 18
- Survivors: 0

On 28 June 1984 an Embraer EMB-110 Bandeirante operated by TAM – Transportes Aéreos Regionais crashed in Brazil with eighteen people on board. There were no survivors.

== Accident ==
The Embraer EMB-110 Bandeirante, with registration PP-SBC, operated by Brazilian airline TAM – Transportes Aéreos Regionais, crashed in to a hillside during let-down to land at Macaé.

The Bandeirante was on a domestic charter flight from Rio de Janeiro-Galeão to Macaé when it flew into São João Hill while descending through rain and clouds over the Municipality of São Pedro da Aldeia. All 16 passengers and 2 crew died.

== Aircraft ==
The aircraft had been chartered by Brazil's state oil company, Petrobras. Fourteen passengers were members of television crews from four different Brazilian networks who were being taken to the Campos Basin oil field to prepare a special report; the other two passengers were employees of Petrobras.

== Causes ==
The crew cancelled the aircraft's flight plan, which had specified operating under Instrument Flight Rules, and descended visually (under Visual Flight Rules); the aircraft hit a hill and was destroyed by the impact and subsequent fire.

== Investigation ==
The crew had attempted to descend in bad weather, rain and low clouds; and the International Civil Aviation Authority Accident Summary states that [the crew] exercised poor judgement [and] failed to see and avoid objects,...[a] poorly planned [approach] and disregard of good operating practice, were factors.
