= Air Vias =

Brazilian airline

- Founded: 1993
- Commenced operations: 1994
- Ceased operations: 1995
- Headquarters: Rio de Janeiro, Brazil

Air Vias was founded on December 25, 1993, as the first Brazilian airline focusing solely on charter flights. Flights commenced in January 1994.

The airline started with a fleet of a Boeing 727-200 and a Douglas DC-8-62. The Boeing 727-200 operated within domestic destinations in Brazil; the Douglas DC-8-62 within international destinations (particularly to the Caribbean).

In 1994, Air Vias flew 159,540 passengers. The year 1995, however, brought many operational difficulties, leading to constant delays and cancellations. Furthermore, the DC-8-62 was returned to the lessor and another Boeing 727-200 was added to the fleet.

During 1995, Air Vias had a contract with Transportes Aéreos da Bacia Amazônica, which chartered one Air Vias' Boeing 727-200 for its scheduled flights on weekdays. On weekends, charter flights were operated by Air Vias.

In November 1995, Air Vias ceased its operations.

== Destinations ==
Air Vias flew to destinations as contracted by tour operators.

Brazilian destinations included Porto Alegre, Foz do Iguaçú, São Paulo-Guarulhos, Rio de Janeiro-Galeão, Belo Horizonte, Salvador, Porto Seguro, Aracajú, Maceió, Recife, Natal, Fortaleza, Manaus, Campo Grande and Cuiabá.

International destinations included Cancún, St. Maarten, Aruba, Barbados, Porlamar (Isla Margarita), and eventual technical stops in Paramaribo when the Boeing 727 operated the flights from São Paulo to Cancún.

The Boeing 727-200 flew from Rio de Janeiro-Galeão and São Paulo-Guarulhos to the Brazilian destinations mentioned above; it was also used on flights to Aruba, Porlamar and St. Maarten (usually with a stopover in Manaus). This aircraft also operated the only scheduled service that Air Vias had: an evening flight to and from São Paulo/Campo Grande/Cuiabá.

The Douglas DC-8 was used on long-haul flights, mainly to Cancún (from São Paulo, Rio de Janeiro, Belo Horizonte and Brasília) and to St. Maarten.

== Fleet ==
Air Vias fleet
Aircraft	Total	Years of operation	Notes
Douglas DC-8-62	1	1993–1994	-
Boeing 727-200	2	1993–1995	1 chartered to TABA in 1995

McDonnell Douglas DC-8-62H – PP-AIY (cn 46070/467)

Boeing 727-247 – PP-AIV (cn 20874/1057) Ex N2818W

Boeing 727-2J4 – PP-AIW (cn 22079/1588)

== Airline Affinity Program ==
Air Vias did not have an airline affinity program.

== See also ==
- List of defunct airlines of Brazil
