= Transportes Aéreos Regionais da Bacia Amazônica =

Brazilian airline

Transportes Aéreos Regionais da Bacia Amazônica (TABA)
IATA	ICAO	Call sign
T2	TAB	TABA
- Founded: 1976
- Ceased operations: 1999
- Headquarters: Belém, Brazil
- Key people: Marcílio Jacques Gibson

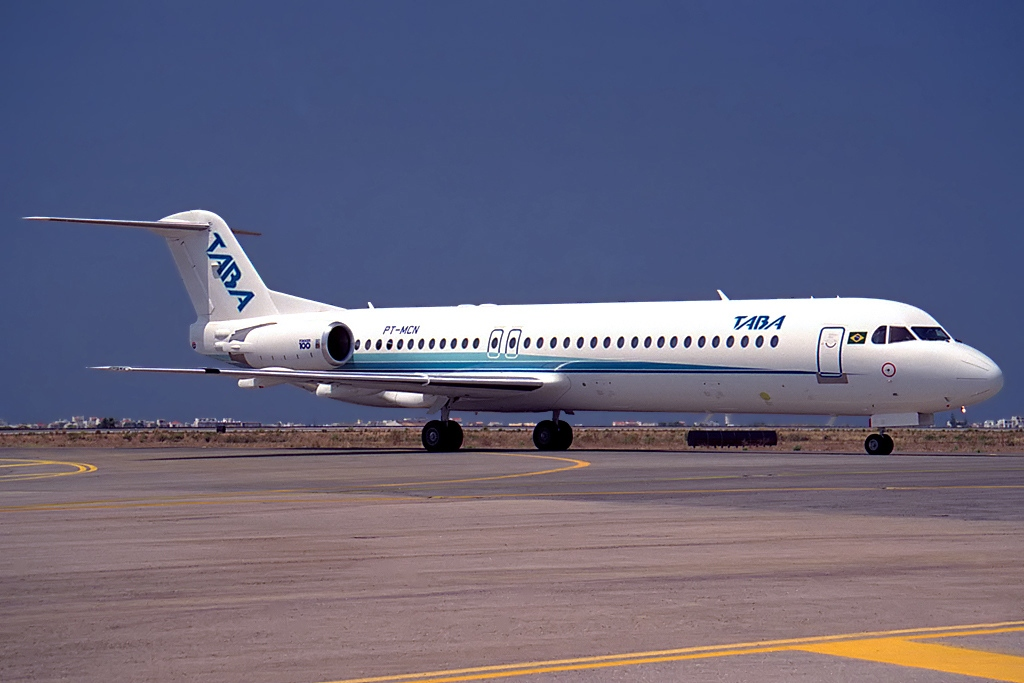
F-100 at Faro Airport

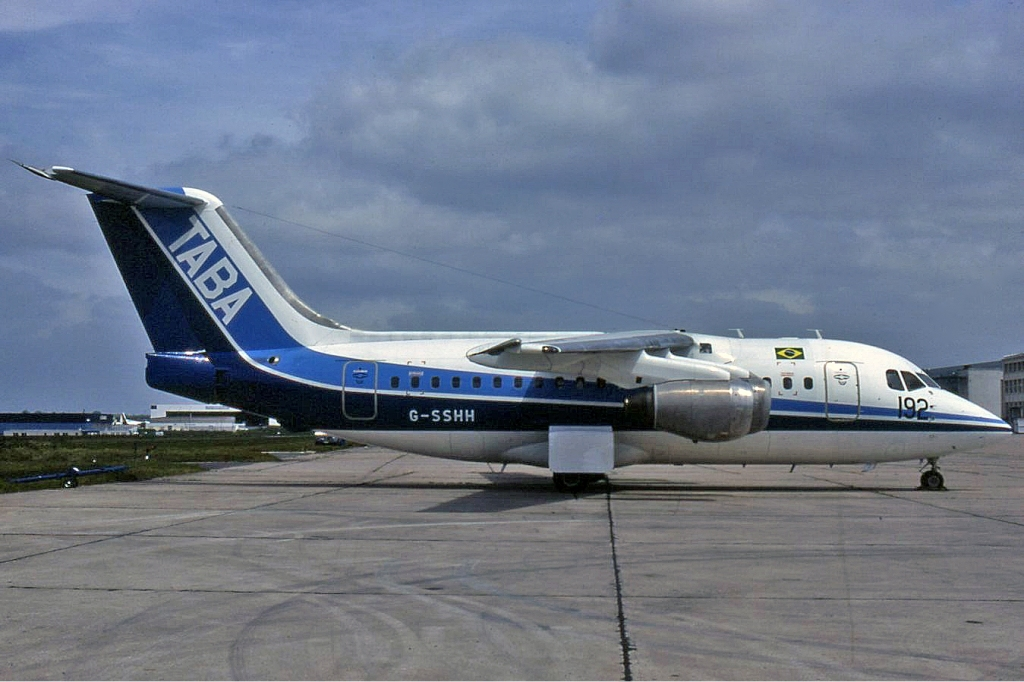
TABA British Aerospace BAe 146-100 at Le Bourget Airport in 1983

TABA – Transportes Aéreos Regionais da Bacia Amazônica was a Brazilian airline founded in 1976. It ceased operations in 1999.

== History ==
On November 11, 1975 the Brazilian Federal Government created the Brazilian Integrated System of Regional Air Transportation and divided the country in five different regions, for which five newly created regional airlines received a concession to operate air services. TABA – Transportes Aéreos Regionais da Bacia Amazônica S/A was the first of those regional airlines to be made operational. Its services started on April 29, 1976 and its operational area comprised roughly the North and parts of the Central-West regions of Brazil, specifically the states of Acre, Amazonas, Amapá, Rondônia, Roraima, and parts of Pará and Mato Grosso.

The history of TABA can be traced to the 1960s, when Marcílio Jacques Gibson who, decades earlier had been one of the share-holders of Lóide Aéreo Nacional before it was sold to VASP, bought Nota – Norte Táxi Aéreo based in Belém. This air taxi operator belonged to the son of the owner of Paraense Transportes Aéreos. When, in 1970, Paraense ceased operations, Gibson used his air taxi operator to fill the void left by Paraense, particularly in the states of Pará and Amapá, offering flights to locations that ceased to be served by air services. During this time, flights were operated by Beechcraft D-18S/H-18S aircraft configured for 9 passengers. After the closure of Paraense, Nota added to its fleet the Curtiss C-46 Commando and Fairchild Hiller FH-227B that previously belonged to Paraense. It was on the foundations of Nota that TABA was created. The former fleet of Nota was further enlarged by the addition of a few Embraer EMB 110 Bandeirante.

In November 1980 TABA had services to 34 cities with a fleet of 10 Embraer EMB 110 Bandeirante and 4 Fairchild Hiller FH-227B. Between 1983 and 1985 TABA operated 2 British Aerospace BAe 146 on the trunk-route Belém-Val de Cães/Itaituba/Alta Floresta/Cuiabá/Vilhena/Ji-Paraná/Porto Velho. However high operating and maintenance costs led TABA to end the leasing contract.

When in 1991 the Federal Government lifted the geographic restrictions for the operations of regional airlines, TABA inaugurated services to Rio de Janeiro-Santos Dumont and Belo Horizonte-Pampulha, linking those two cities to its already established network in the Amazon Basin. During this time TABA also initiated the renovation of its fleet replacing the Fairchild Hiller FH-227B for Bombardier Dash 8-300. In 1992 TABA started services to Georgetown, Guyana, being the first regional airline to establish international flights.

TABA operated 2 Fokker 100 between 1993 and 1995 but increasing economic difficulties led to the end of their lease contract. In an attempt to replace services operated by those aircraft, TABA chartered a Boeing 727-200 belonging to the Brazilian charter operator Air Vias on weekdays. Their contract ended in November 1995 when Air Vias ceased to fly. Operations with the Dash 8-300 were also canceled in 1996 and aircraft were returned to the lessor.

In 1997 TABA was already in serious economic trouble and finally in 1999 it ceased operations.

== Destinations ==
TABA operated an extensive network in the Northern and Central-West regions of Brazil.

== Fleet ==
TABA fleet
Aircraft	Total	Years of operation	Notes
Beechcraft D-18S/H-18S	7	1976–1979	
Curtiss C-46 Commando	1	1976–1981	
Embraer EMB 110 Bandeirante	11	1976–1999	
Fairchild Hiller FH-227B	8	1976–1999	
British Aerospace 146	2	1983–1985	
Bombardier Dash 8-300	6	1991–1996	
Fokker 100	2	1993–1995	
Boeing 727-200	1	1995–1995	chartered from Air Vias

== Accidents and incidents ==
=== Accidents ===
- 31 January 1978: an Embraer EMB 110 Bandeirante registration PT-GKW crashed upon take-off from Eirunepé. The crew of 2 died but all 14 passengers survived.
- 12 June 1982: a Fairchild Hiller FH-227 registration PT-LBV en route from Eirunepé to Tabatinga on approach to Tabatinga collided with a pole in poor visibility and crashed onto a car park. All 40 passengers and 4 crew died.
- 23 June 1985: an Embraer EMB 110 Bandeirante registration PT-GJN flying from Juara to Cuiabá while on approach to land at Cuiabá had technical problems on engine number 1. An emergency landing was attempted but the aircraft stalled and crashed 1 km short of the runway. All 17 occupants died.
- 6 June 1990: a Fairchild Hiller FH-227 registration PT-ICA flying from Belém-Val de Cans to Cuiabá via Altamira, Santarém, Itaituba and Alta Floresta, while on approach to land under fog at Altamira, descended below the approach path, collided with trees and crashed 850m short of the runway. Of 41 passengers and crew, 23 died.
- 28 December 1991: A Embraer EMB-110 Bandeirante registered PT-GKX operating as TABA Flight 876 from Marechal to Sementes collided with a Beechcraft A36 Bonanza over Saõ José do Rio Claro. The Beechcraft was obliterated after impacting the ground shortly after the collision killing all 6 onboard. The 2 crew onboard Flight 876 would land safely with substantial damage to one of the Horizontal Stabilizers. According to the final report the crew of Flight 876 believed the Beechcraft was flying 1000ft below its actual altitude.
- 25 January 1993: a Fairchild Hiller FH-227 registration PT-LCS operating a cargo flight from Belém-Val de Cans to Altamira crashed into the jungle near Altamira during night-time approach procedures. The crew of 3 died.
- 28 November 1995: a Fairchild Hiller FH-227 registration PP-BUJ operating a cargo flight from Belém-Val de Cans to Santarém crashed on its second attempt to approach Santarém. The crew of 2 and 1 of the 2 occupants died.

=== Incidents ===
- 6 March 1991: an Embraer EMB 110 Bandeirante flying to Manaus was hijacked near São Gabriel da Cachoeira by 3 persons.
- 15 December 1994: an Embraer EMB 110 Bandeirante en route from Carauari and Tefé to Manaus was hijacked by two Colombian citizens. The passengers were released in the proximity of Tabatinga and the aircraft was flown to Colombia. The crew was released at the Brazilian Embassy in Bogotá.

== See also ==
- List of defunct airlines of Brazil
