= Wasawings =

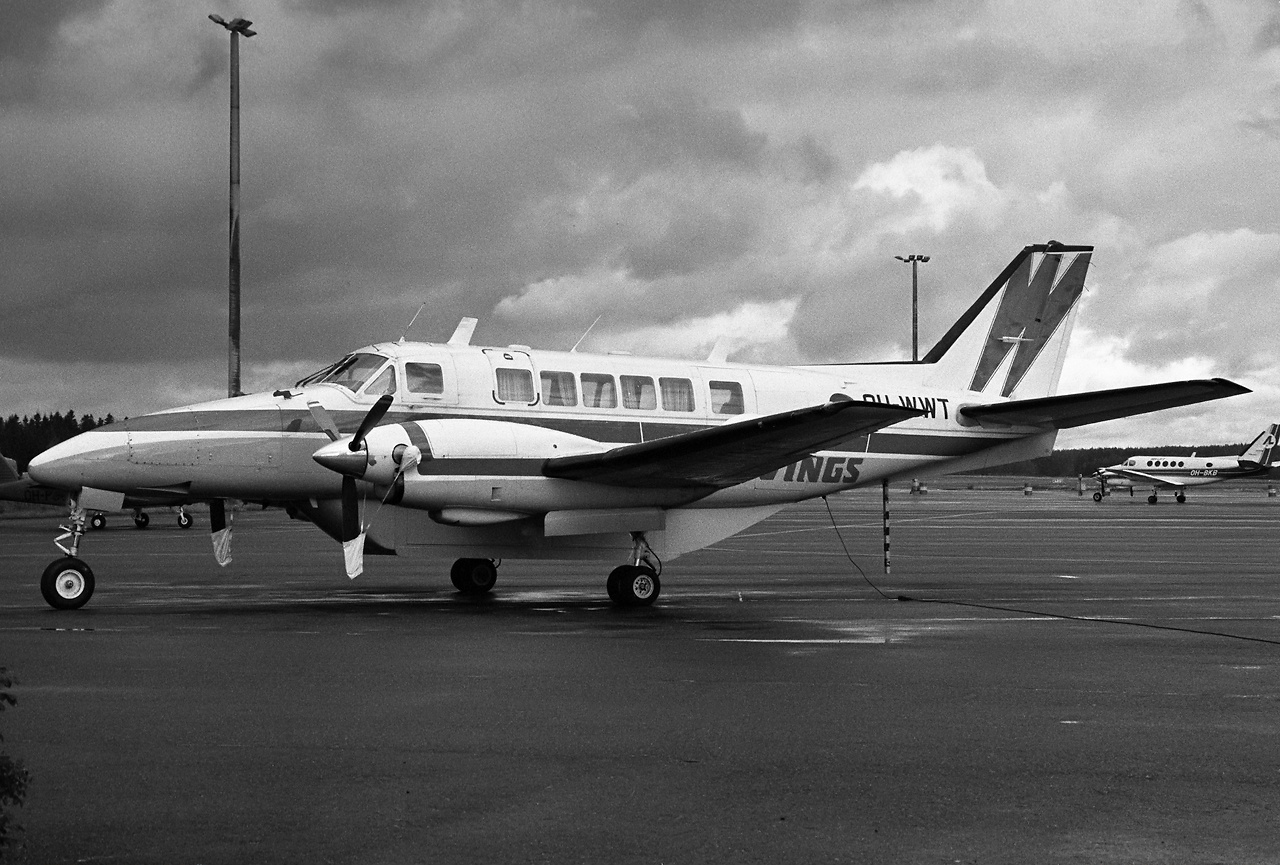
- Beech 99
- Commenced operations: 1981
- Ceased operations: 1988

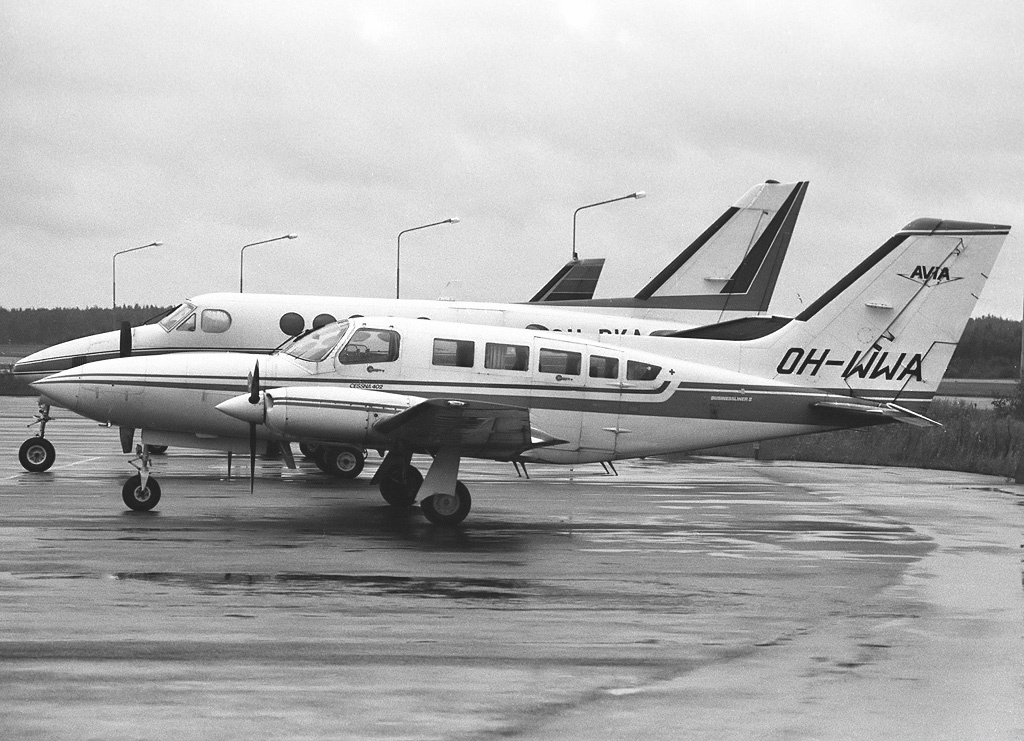
Cessna 402

Oy Wasawings Ab was an airline based in Finland which was operational from 1981 to 1988.

== History ==
The airline got the licence to fly from the Civil Aviation Administration of Finland in November 1981. After the licence was extended to also include taxi and charter flights from 1982 to 1983. In December 1983 Wasawings started schedules between Ilmajoki and Helsinki-Vantaa. In 1985 it flew from Helsinki to Ylivieska too. Indeed many complaints for the company operation were received from customers and staff. The company had a poor security culture and airline captains were forced to shift numbers in flight logs. The company's main owners were the chairman Veikko Tuutti and some companies from Ostrobothnia. Also it had numerous private investors. Wasa Wings recorded 13,000 passengers in 1987 and 14,600 passengers in 1988.

== Fleet ==
In addition to a leased Embraer 110 EMB-P1 Bandeirante, the company had two Beech 99 aircraft and a Cessna 404.

== Accidents and incidents ==
- On August 31, 1986 its Cessna 404 Titan (OH-CIG) crashed into a power line which ran along the edge of the Ylivieska airport. The plane cut trees over 150 meters and then caught fire.
- The company lost its flying licence when an Embraer 110 EMB-P1 Bandeirante (OH-EBA, built in 1979 and leased from Kar-Air) crashed near Ilmajoki on a flight from Helsinki.
