= AirNow =

US-american cargo airline

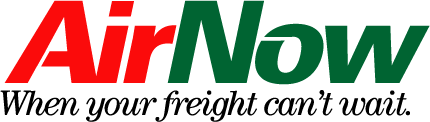
| IATA | ICAO | Call sign |
|---|---|---|
| - | RLR | RATTLER |
- Founded: 1957; 69 years ago
- Ceased operations: 2011; 15 years ago Merged with United Parcel Service after termination of UPS's Contracts
- Hubs: William H. Morse State Airport
- Focus cities: Buffalo Niagara International Airport; Albany International Airport
- Fleet size: 17 or 18
- Headquarters: Bennington, Vermont, United States

AirNow was an American cargo airline based in Bennington, Vermont. It operated scheduled and charter cargo services throughout the northeast. Its main base was William H. Morse State Airport in Bennington.

== History ==
The airline was established in 1957 as Business Air. It operated as "Business Air" until 1970, at which time it was renamed AirNow. The airline then had a contract signing with United Parcel Service (UPS) to improve its mailing service. AirNow selected Buffalo Niagara International Airport and Albany International Airport as key airports to increase business and customer service and satisfaction. John Likakis served as safety director for the airline, and after it ceased operations, general manager of the airport through the non-profit Bennington Airport Development Corp.

=== Cessation of services ===
The Great Recession led to a decline of activity at the airport, and AirNow ceased operations on February 24, 2011, when its contracts with UPS were terminated. The Airline then lost income, filed for Chapter 11 bankruptcy, and then merged with UPS. UPS changed AirNow into UPS Express Critical.

== Fleet ==
The AirNow fleet operated the following aircraft (as of April 2008):

- 11 Embraer EMB-110P1 Bandeirante
- 1 Embraer EMB-110P2 Bandeirante
- 5 Cessna Caravan 675

After AirNow's merger with UPS, its whole fleet was sold to American Airlines, UPS Airlines, and Airlink.

== See also ==
- List of defunct airlines of the United States
