= Royal Air Freight =

Airline of the United States

IATA	ICAO	Call sign
-	RAX	AIR ROYAL
- Founded: 1961
- Hubs: Oakland County International Airport
- Fleet size: 22
- Headquarters: Waterford, Michigan, United States
- Key people: Kirt Kostich
- Website: www.royalair.com

Royal Air Freight (also known as Royal Air Charter) is an American passenger and cargo airline based in Waterford, Michigan, adjacent to the Oakland County International Airport. The airline is licensed and certified to serve the US, Canada and Mexico with charter passenger and air cargo services.

Its main base is Oakland County International Airport, located 6 miles west of Pontiac, Michigan.

== History ==
The airline started operations in 1961 and has 30 pilots as of 2026. Kirt Kostich serves as president of Royal Air Freight Inc., and members of the Kostich family serve as the firm's officers.

== Fleet ==
The airlines fleet includes the following aircraft, among others (as of January 8, 2010)

- 7 Cessna 310R
- 6 Dassault Falcon 20
- 5 Embraer EMB 110 Bandeirante
- 6 Learjet 25B
- 4 Learjet 35A

== Accidents ==
- The pilot and co-pilot of a Royal Air Freight Learjet 35A (registration N720RA) were killed when it crashed while attempting its final approach to land at Chicago Executive Airport on January 5, 2010. The plane was not carrying cargo at the time and was heading to the airport to pick up cargo.
- In January 2014, a Royal Air Freight Cessna 310 aircraft crashed short of the runway at the Oakland County International Airport. Though pilot error was eventually identified as the probable cause of the crash, Royal Air Freight was also blamed for providing inadequate training and supervision to the pilot, as well as for the pilot's lack of night-flying experience in that type of aircraft.
