= Air Fiji Flight 121 =

1999 aviation accident in Fiji

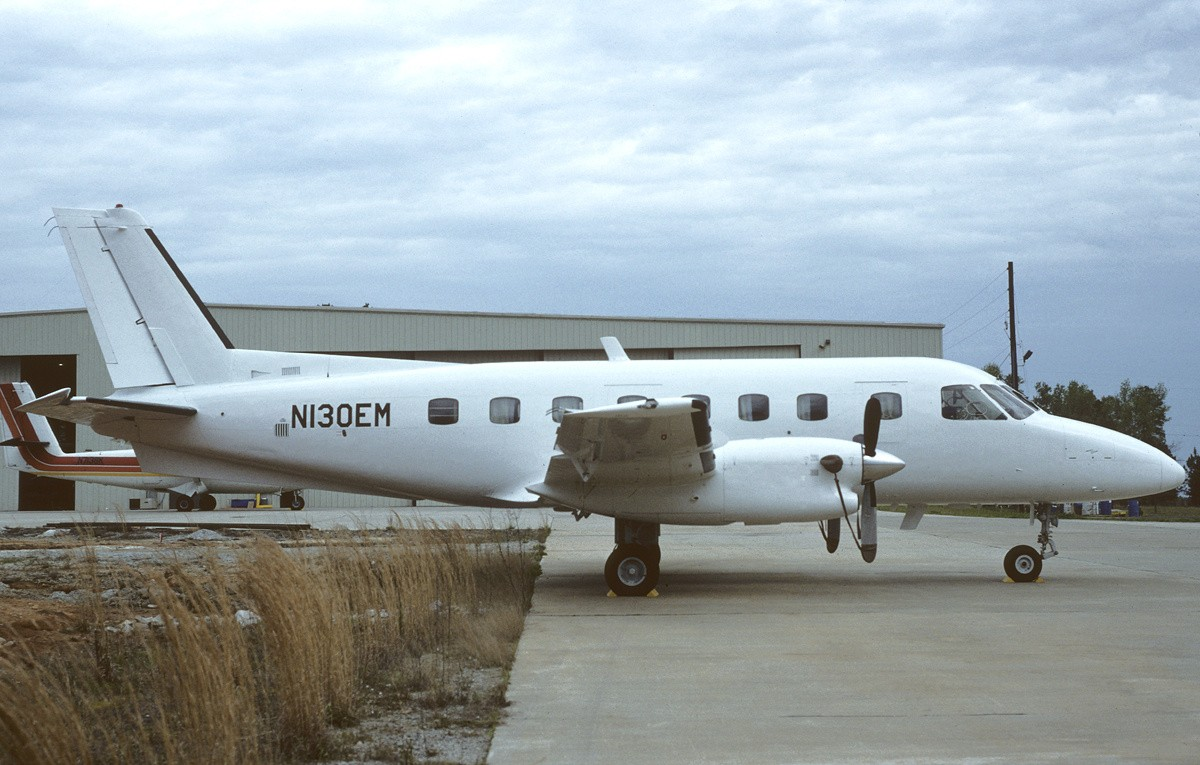
- The aircraft involved in the crash pictured in 1991 under a previous registration

Accident
- Date: 24 July 1999
- Summary: Intoxication, pilot error
- Site: Nasevou village, Delailasakau, Fiji

Aircraft
- Aircraft type: Embraer EMB 110 Bandeirante
- Operator: Air Fiji
- Registration: DQ-AFN
- Flight origin: Nausori International Airport, Suva, Fiji
- Destination: Nadi International Airport, Nadi, Fiji
- Occupants: 17
- Passengers: 15
- Crew: 2
- Fatalities: 17
- Survivors: 0

Air Fiji Flight 121 (PC121/FAJ121) was a scheduled domestic passenger flight from Nausori International Airport in Fiji's capital Suva to Nadi International Airport in Nadi, operated by an Embraer EMB 110 Bandeirante. On 24 July 1999, the Bandeirante crashed into a mountain near Delailasakau, killing all 15 passengers and 2 crew on board, making it the deadliest aviation accident to occur in Fiji.

== Accident ==
The Bandeirante took off from Nausori with 15 passengers and 2 crew. The aircraft was carrying nine Fijians, five Australians, one New Zealander, one Chinese, and one Japanese. 15 minutes after takeoff from Nausori International Airport, the aircraft slammed into the mountainside near Delailasakau, shortly after dawn. Radio contact was lost with the aircraft. At about 08:40, police received a call from the radio telephone operator from Windina to say that they heard a loud crash out in the hills, north of Nasevou village. Witnesses stated that they saw the aircraft flying low, and shortly after slammed into the mountainside. One man stated that he heard a "cannonball" during the crash. He then saw parts from the tail fall down.

A search team was dispatched by the authorities. Shortly after, a helicopter spotted the wreckage of Flight 121. There were no signs of life on the crash site. The crash site was in a remote area, about six hours' walk from the nearest village, with few roads and no telephone links. Rescuers were forced to evacuate the bodies by foot. Police operations director Jahir Khan said police would try to remove the bodies by 25 July. Lack of equipment hampered the evacuation process and several severely mutilated bodies trapped in the wreckage had to be recovered by cutting and removing the wreckage from the area.

== Aircraft ==
The aircraft involved in the crash was an Embraer EMB 110 Bandeirante (Serial Number 110416) registered in Fiji as DQ-AFN. Powered by two Pratt & Whitney Canada PT6A-34 turboprop engines, the aircraft was first flown in 1983 and had flown a total of 22411 cycles. The aircraft was registered in America and Australia prior to being operated by Air Fiji.

== Investigation ==
The Civil Aviation Authority of Fiji (CAAF) investigated the crash of Flight 121, with assistance from the Australian Transport Safety Bureau (ATSB). Interviews conducted by the CAAF found that witnesses stated that before the aircraft crashed, parts of its tail and wings fell down onto the forest, indicating a possible structural failure. The tail fin and horizontal stabilisers were found 300 m (980 ft) to the left of the line of flight. This was consistent with a pre-impact structural failure, meaning that the aircraft may have broken up in the air before crashing to the ground. Specific investigations later found that the captain of Flight 121 may have been intoxicated. The brother of the captain stated that four hours before the crash the captain of the flight had been drinking alcohol. The investigation also revealed that the captain had insufficient rest and that he had consumed an above-therapeutic level of antihistamine prior to the flight. Air Fiji's standard operating procedure was also found to be inadequate.

The structural failure that occurred in flight was a result from the crew's error in descending below the Minimum Descent Altitude of 5,400 ft (1,600 m). The right wing struck a ridge at an elevation of 1,300 ft (400 m), the aircraft then broke up and impacted the slope of a ridge 1.3 km (0.81 mi; 0.70 nmi) further on. The tail section and right wing were found 150 m (490 ft) from the main wreckage.

== See also ==
- Trans-Colorado Airlines Flight 2286
- Crossair Flight 498
- Aeroflot Flight 821
