= Embraer EMB 110 Bandeirante =

Brazilian twin-turboprop light transport aircraft

EMB 110 Bandeirante
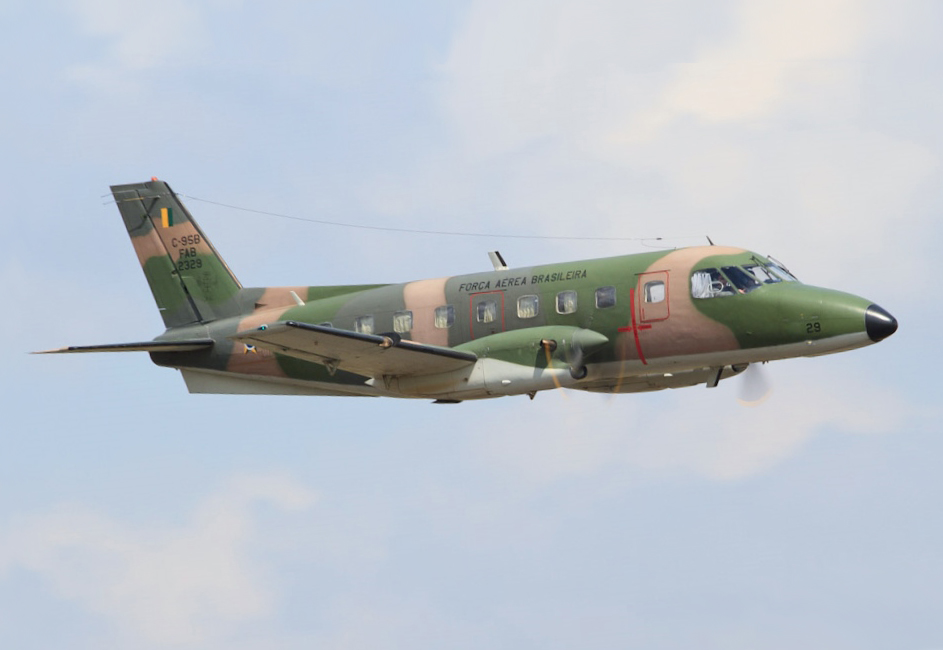
- An EMB 110 with the Brazilian Air Force

General information
- Type: Turboprop regional airliner
- National origin: Brazil
- Manufacturer: Embraer
- Status: In limited commercial service, in active military service
- Primary users: Brazilian Air Force Wiggins Airways Transportes Aereos Guatemaltecos
- Number built: 503

History
- Manufactured: 1968–1990
- Introduction date: 16 April 1973
- First flight: 26 October 1968

The Embraer EMB 110 Bandeirante (English: pioneer) is a Brazilian twin-turboprop light transport aircraft designed by Embraer for military and civil use.

The EMB 110 was designed by the French engineer Max Holste; it had been designed in line with specifications issued by the Brazilian Ministry of Aeronautics in 1965. The goal was to create a general purpose aircraft, suitable for both civilian and military roles with a low operational cost and high reliability. On 26 October 1968, the YV-95 prototype performed its maiden flight; an additional two EMB 110 development aircraft would follow along with an initial order for 80 transport aircraft for the Brazilian Air Force in the following year. Type certification was received from the Brazilian aviation authorities in late 1972, permitting its entry to service in April 1973 with the Brazilian airline company Transbrasil.

Various customers in both the military and civilian sectors opted to procure the EMB 110 during its 22-year production run. Over one hundred examples would serve with the Brazilian Air Force, who would modernise numerous examples during the twenty-first century to permit their continued operation. The EMB 110, being customisable to suit various roles and operator requirements, was adapted for various specialist roles, including aerial observation, maritime patrol, and search and rescue missions. During the 1970s, Embraer opted to design an enlarged derivative of the EMB 110, designated as the EMB 120 Brasilia; being faster, outfitted with a pressurized cabin, and able to accommodate up to 30 passengers, Embraer opted to concentrate its resources on the new aircraft. As a result, production of the EMB 110 was terminated in 1990.

== Design and development ==
=== Background ===
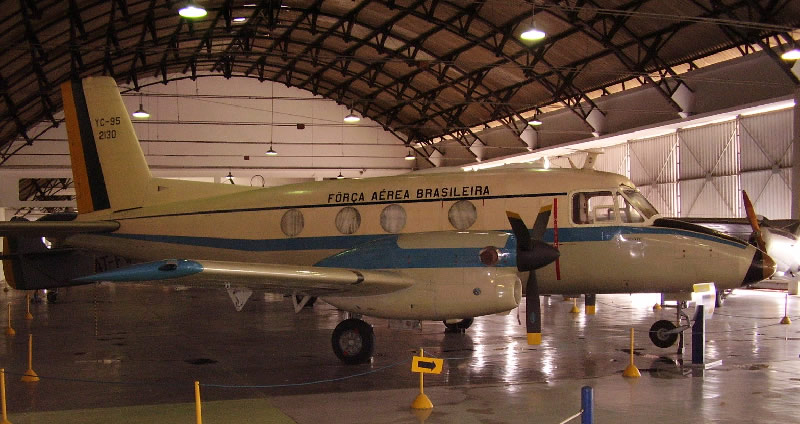
YC-95 first prototype (EMB-100) in Aerospace Museum, Rio de Janeiro

The origins of the EMB 110 Bandeirante can be traced back to the issuing of a directive by the Brazilian Ministry of Aeronautics in 1965; this called for the production of a transport aircraft for both civilian and military operations that would be reliable and possess low operating costs. It was to be equipped with turboprop engines, a low-mounted wing, and have sufficient capacity to accommodate eight personnel; these stipulations had been drawn from a study of Brazilian commercial air traffic, and aimed to produce an aircraft that would be well suited to the existing airport infrastructure of the country at that time. The resulting specification that had been generated under the IPD-6504 programme would greatly shape the future aircraft.

Early work on what would become the EMB 110 actually predates the establishment of its manufacturer, Embraer, which was founded in August 1969. The lead designer was the French engineer Max Holste. Construction of the prototype was supervised by the Brazilian aeronautical engineer Ozires Silva, who would also play a key role in founding and running of Embraer. The company was created to undertake the aircraft's commercialisation and serial production.

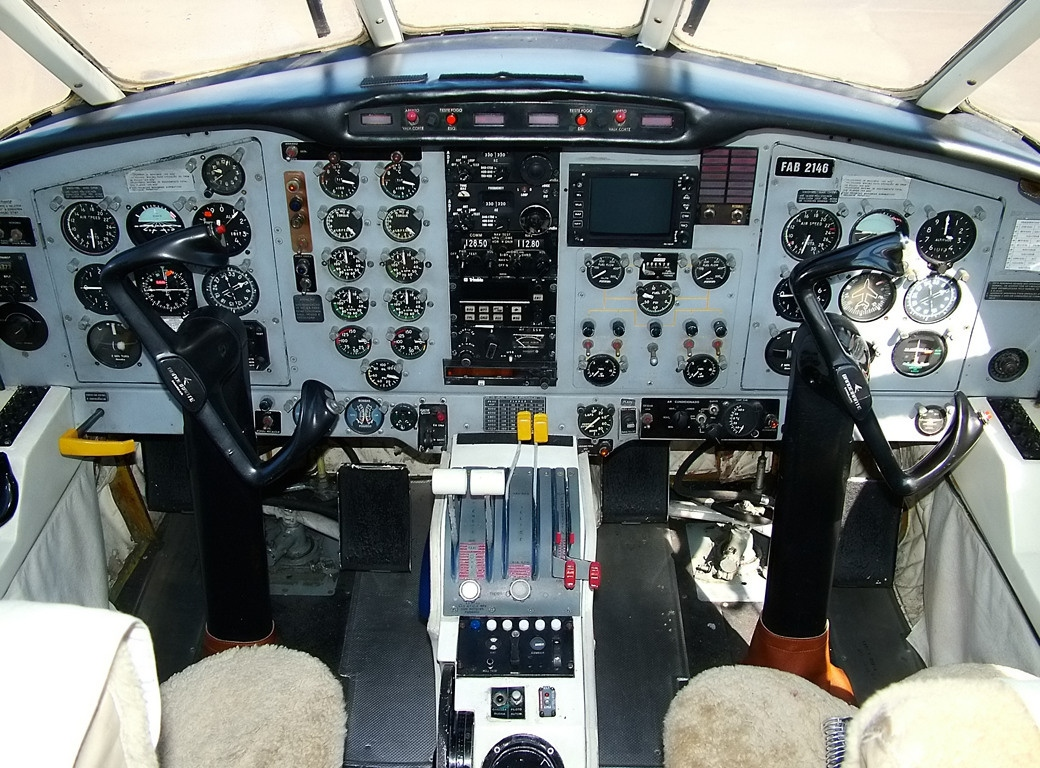
EMB 110A cockpit

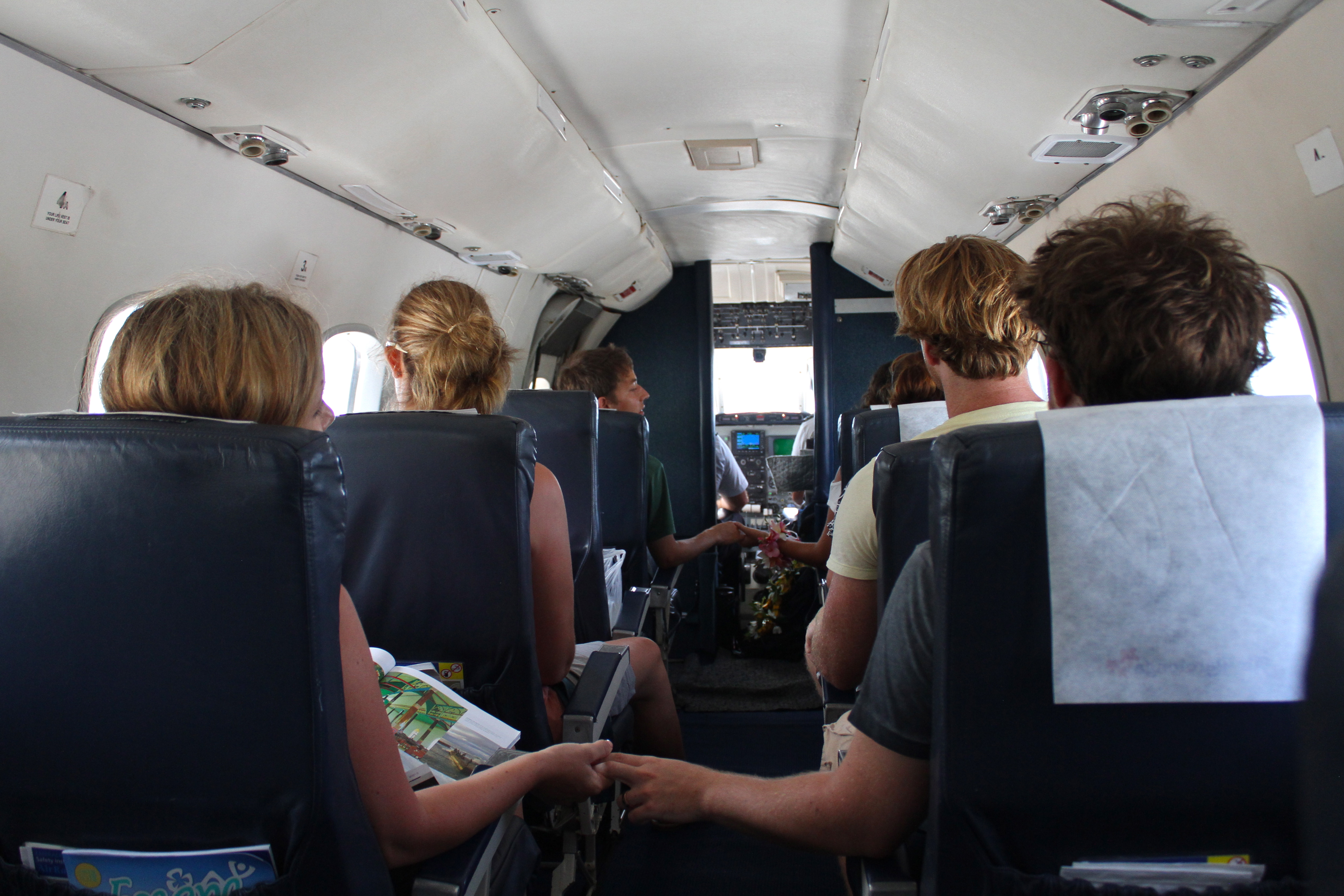
EMB 110 cabin, operated by Air Rarotonga

On 26 October 1968, the first prototype, carrying the military designation YC-95, performed its maiden flight from São José dos Campos Airport. Piloted by José Mariotto Ferreira and accompanied by flight engineer Michel Cury, it landed after roughly 50 minutes. Prior to this point, a total of 110,000 project hours had been worked, producing 12,000 manufacturing drawings, supported by 22,000 hours of structural and aerodynamic calculations; an estimated 282,000 hours of aircraft manufacturing and tooling has also been expended. The prototype was officially presented before various civil and military officials along with members of the press at an event held four days later, during which its maiden flight was repeated. The positive performance of the prototype led to production of the aircraft, and thus the establishment of Embraer, being approved in mid-1969; the newly created company would assume responsibility for its production on 2 January 1970.

=== Redesign and quantity production ===
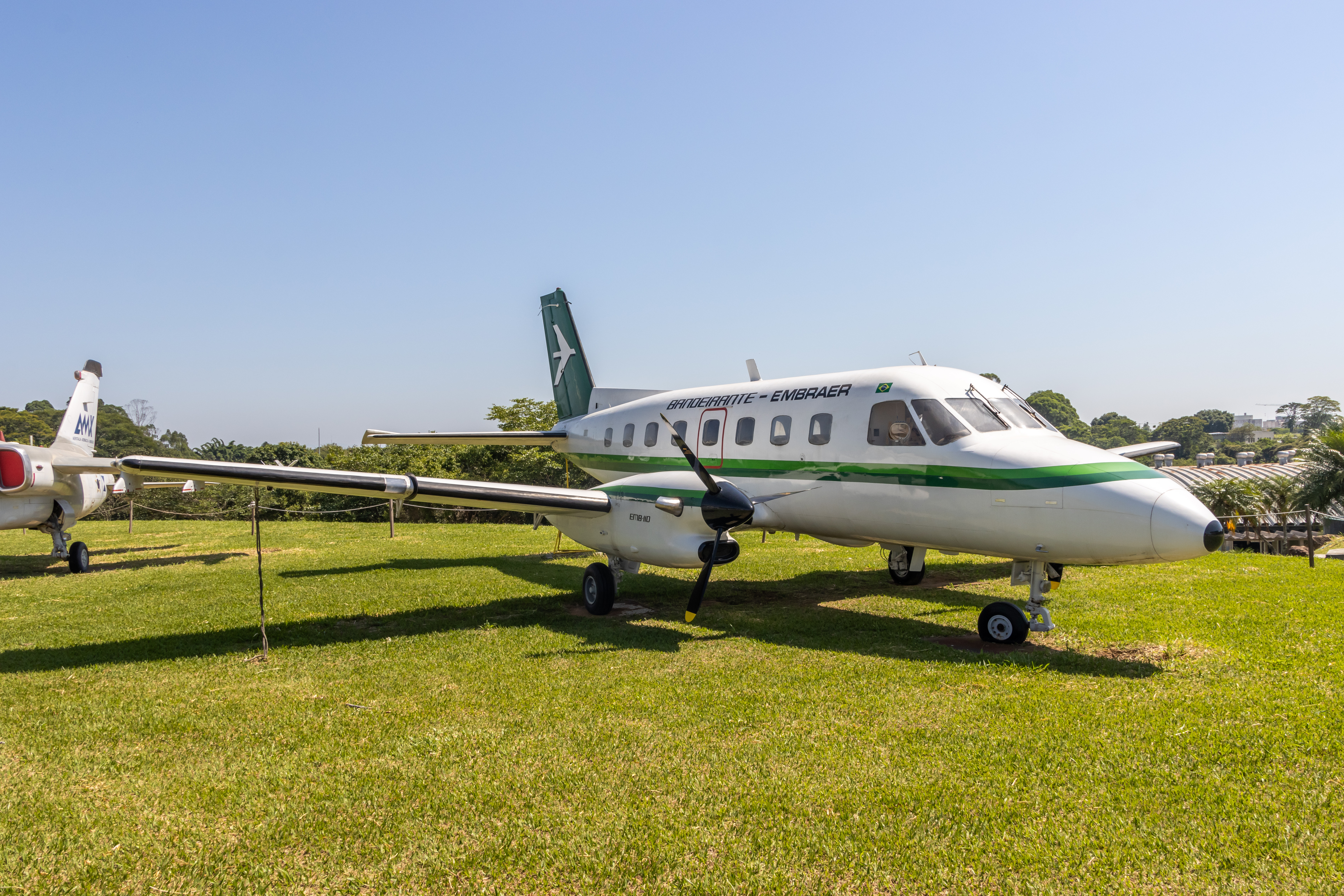
EMB 110 Bandeirante prototype at Memorial Aeroespacial Brasileiro, São Jose dos Campos

An additional pair of prototypes were constructed, which were designated EMB 100. On 19 October 1969, the second prototype performed its first flight, while the third prototype followed on 29 June 1970. While these prototypes yielded positive test results, it was recognised that market conditions had shifted to the point where an eight-seat aircraft appeared to be less viable than it had previously appeared; thus, it was decided to quickly redesign the EMB 100 into the EMB 110 Bandeirante, which featured several technological advances along with greater capacity.

In May 1970, the programme was bolstered by the Brazilian Air Force (FAB) deciding to issue Embraer with an initial order for 80 production aircraft. Near the end of 1972, the Bandeirante received its Brazilian airworthiness certificate. On 9 February 1973, the first delivery was made to FAB.

In a typical configuration, the EMB 110 seated between 15 and 21 passengers, and was flown by a pair of pilots. Various configurations and customisations were possible in order to suit customers' diverse requirements and operating conditions. The EMB 110P1A/41 model, which was furnished with seats for 18 passengers, had a length of 15.1 metres (50 ft), a height of 4.92 metres (16.1 ft), and a wingspan of 15.33 metres (50.3 ft). It has a maximum cruising speed of 411 km/h (222 kn), while its more economical cruising speed was 341 km/h (184 kn), at which speed an effective range of 1,964 km (1,060 nmi) can be achieved even while retaining reserve fuels for another 45 minutes of flight. The EMB 110 has a service ceiling of 21,500 feet (6,600 m).

During the 1970s, Embraer opted to build on the success of the EMB 110 by designing an enlarged derivative of the aircraft, designated as the EMB 120 Brasilia; beyond being large enough to accommodate up to 30 passengers, it was also faster and furnished with a pressurized cabin. All further development of the EMB 110 was halted by Embraer during the 1980s in order to concentrate its resources on the further development and production of the newer EMB 120 instead.

== Operational history ==
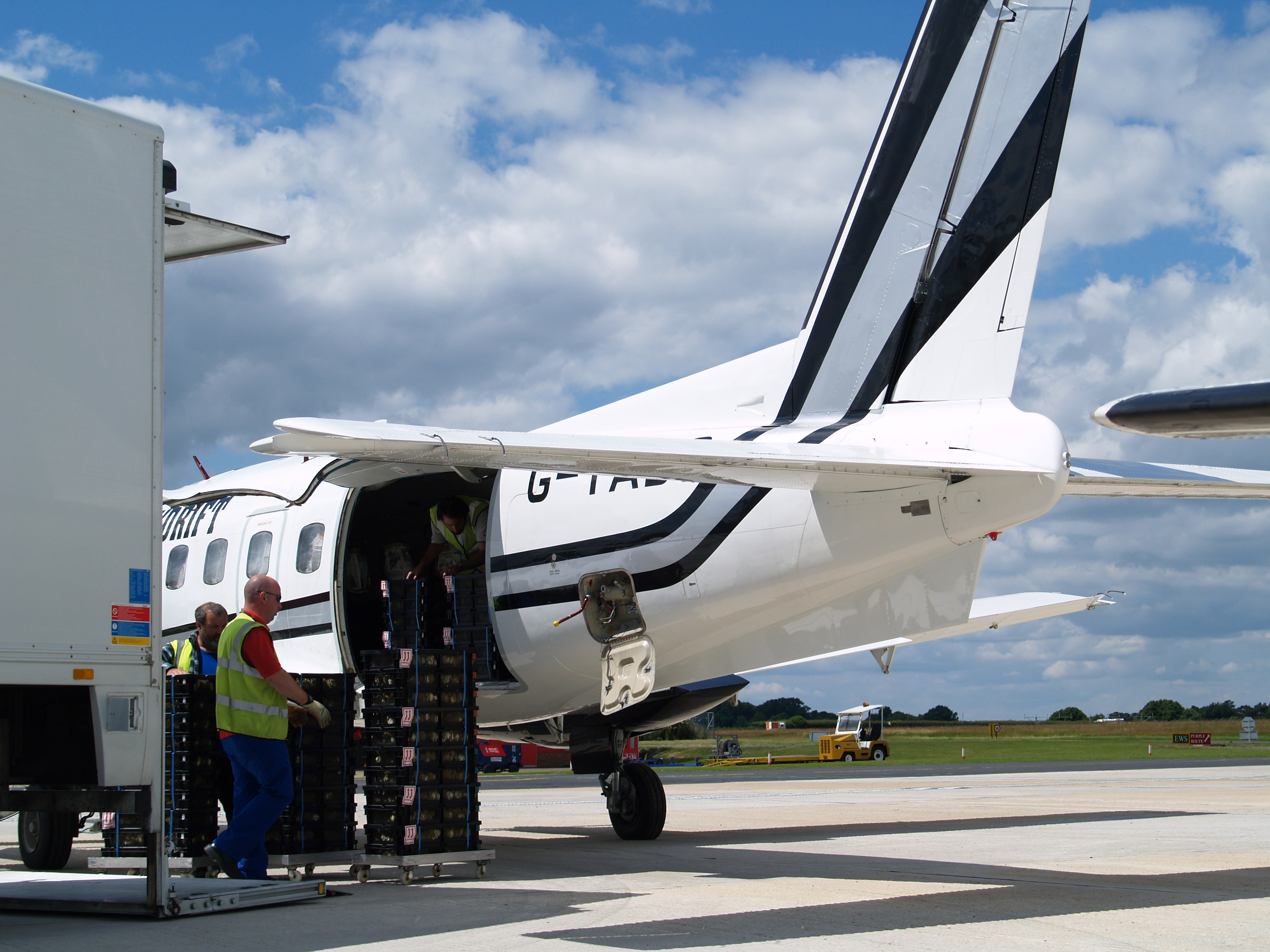
EMB 110 registration G-TABS, operated by Skydrift, loading through the large cargo door

Between 1968 and 1990, Embraer constructed a total of 494 aircraft in numerous configurations for a variety of roles. The passenger model first flew on 9 August 1972 and entered commercial service on 16 April 1973 with the now defunct Brazilian airline company Transbrasil. On 8 July 1985, the first aircraft to be operated by the Irish budget airline Ryanair in 1985 was 15-seat EMB 110; the airline continued to operate the type up until 1989. By October 2018, 50 years after its first flight and 498 deliveries, about 150 EMB 110s were still operating at airlines, air taxis, government entities, and air forces around the world. Production of the type came to an end in 1990, the EMB 110 having been superseded by the Embraer EMB 120 Brasilia, a derived successor.

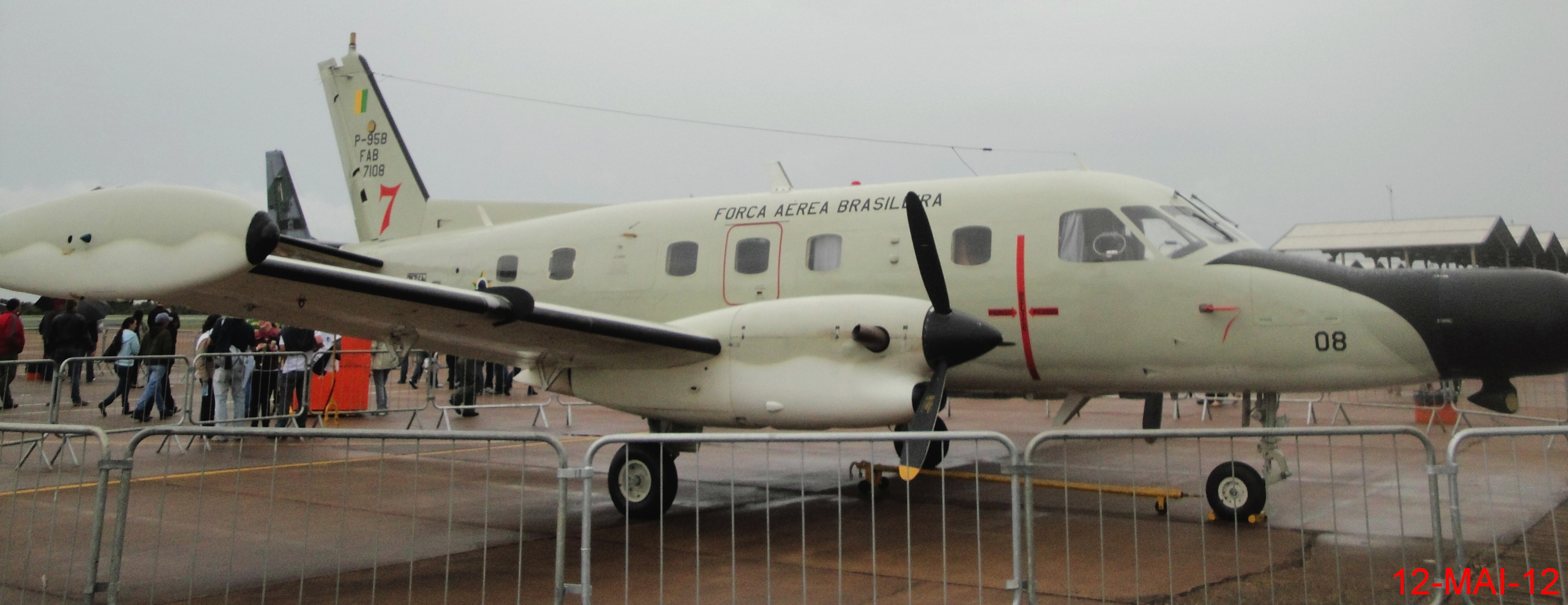
Embraer EMB-111 patrol aircraft

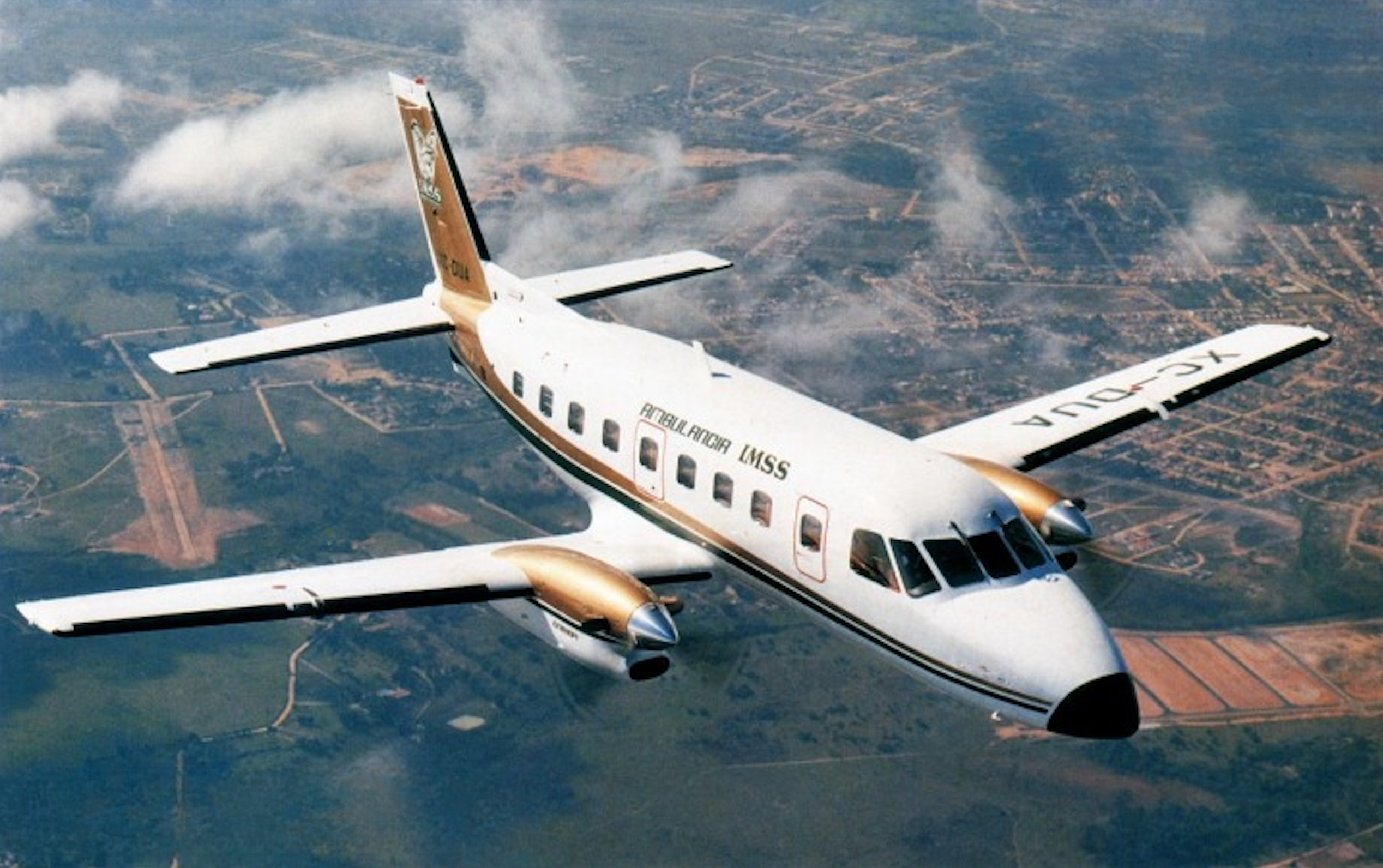
EMB-110P1 air ambulance, operated by the Mexican Social Security Institute (IMSS) on regular routes and schedules from 1979 to 1982

During February 1973, deliveries of the type commenced to the Brazilian Air Force. A pair of EMB 111A Patrulha maritime patrol aircraft were leased to the Argentine Navy during the Falklands War, acting as a stop-gap measure between the retirement of the service's last Lockheed SP-2H Neptune and the introduction of modified Lockheed L-188 Electras. On 15 December 2010, the Brazilian Air Force flew its first upgraded EMB 110, which had been equipped with modern avionics equipment. Designated as C/P-95, the aircraft has had several new systems installed by Israeli firm Elbit Systems' Brazilian subsidiary, Aeroeletronica. At the time, the Brazilian Air Force had an active fleet of 96 EMB 110s. In 2017, the Brazilian Air Force was reportedly operating 48 EMB 110s.

== Variants ==
- YC-95 or EMB 100 – Prototype, powered by two 550 shp (410 kW) Pratt & Whitney Canada PT6A-20 turboprop engines. Three built.
- EMB 110 Initial production version, powered by 680 shp (510 kW) PT6A-27 engines – Twelve seat military transport for the Brazilian Air Force, who designate it the C-95. 60 built.
- EMB 110A – Radio calibration version for the Brazilian Air Force (EC-95). Three built.
- EC-95B – Calibration version for the Brazilian Air Force.
- EMB 110B – Aerial survey, aerial photography version. Seven built, six as R-95 for the Brazilian Air Force.
- EMB 110C – The first commercial model, similar to C-95, a 15-seat passenger version.
- EMB 110C(N) – Three navalised EMB 110Cs sold to the Chilean Navy.
- EMB 110E Executive version of EMB 110C. Six to eight seats.
  - EMB 110E(J) Modified version of EMB 110E.
- EMB 110K Stretched version with 0.85 m (2 ft 9 in) fuselage plug and 750 shp (560 kW) PT6A-34 engines and fitted with ventral fin.
  - EMB 110K1 – Cargo transport version for the Brazilian Air Force, with cargo door in rear fuselage. 20 built, designated C-95A.
- EMB 110P Dedicated commuter version of EMB 110C for Brazilian airlines, powered by PT6A-27 or -34 engines.
- EMB 110P1 – Quick change civil cargo/passenger transport version based on EMB 110K1, with same rear cargo door.
- EMB 110P2 – Dedicated civil passenger version of EMB 110P1, without cargo door.
- EMB 111A Patrulha – Maritime patrol version for the Brazilian Air Force. The aircraft also has the Brazilian Air Force designation P-95 Bandeirulha.
- P-95B – Improved EMB 111, with more advanced avionics and strengthened structure. Ten built for Brazilian Air Force.
- EMB 111AN – Six maritime patrol aircraft sold to the Chilean Navy.
- C-95B – Quick change cargo/passenger version for the Brazilian Air Force.
- EMB 110P1 SAR – Search and rescue version.
- EMB 110P/A – 18 seat passenger version, intended for export.
- EMB 110P1/A – Mixed passenger/freight version with enlarged cargo door.
- EMB 110P1/41 – Cargo/passenger transport aircraft.
- EMB 110P1K/110K – Military version.
- C-95C – The Brazilian Air Force version of the EMB 110P2.
- EMB 110P2
- EMB 110P2/A – Modifications for airline commuter role, seating up to 21 passengers.
- EMB 110P2/41 – 21-seat pressurised commuter airliner.
- EMB 110S1 – Geophysical survey version.
- SC-95 – Search and rescue version for the Brazilian Air Force.
- XC-95 – Rain research version for the Brazilian Air Force.
- C/P-95 – Updated version with modernised avionics.

== Operators ==
In 2020, 39 Bandeirantes were still in airline service with 15 operators, 31 in North/South America, 1 in Africa and 7 in Asia Pacific & Middle East. The main operators are:

- 7: Wiggins Airways
- 5: Royal Air Freight
- 4: Transportes Aereos Guatemaltecos

== Specifications (EMB 110P1A/41) ==
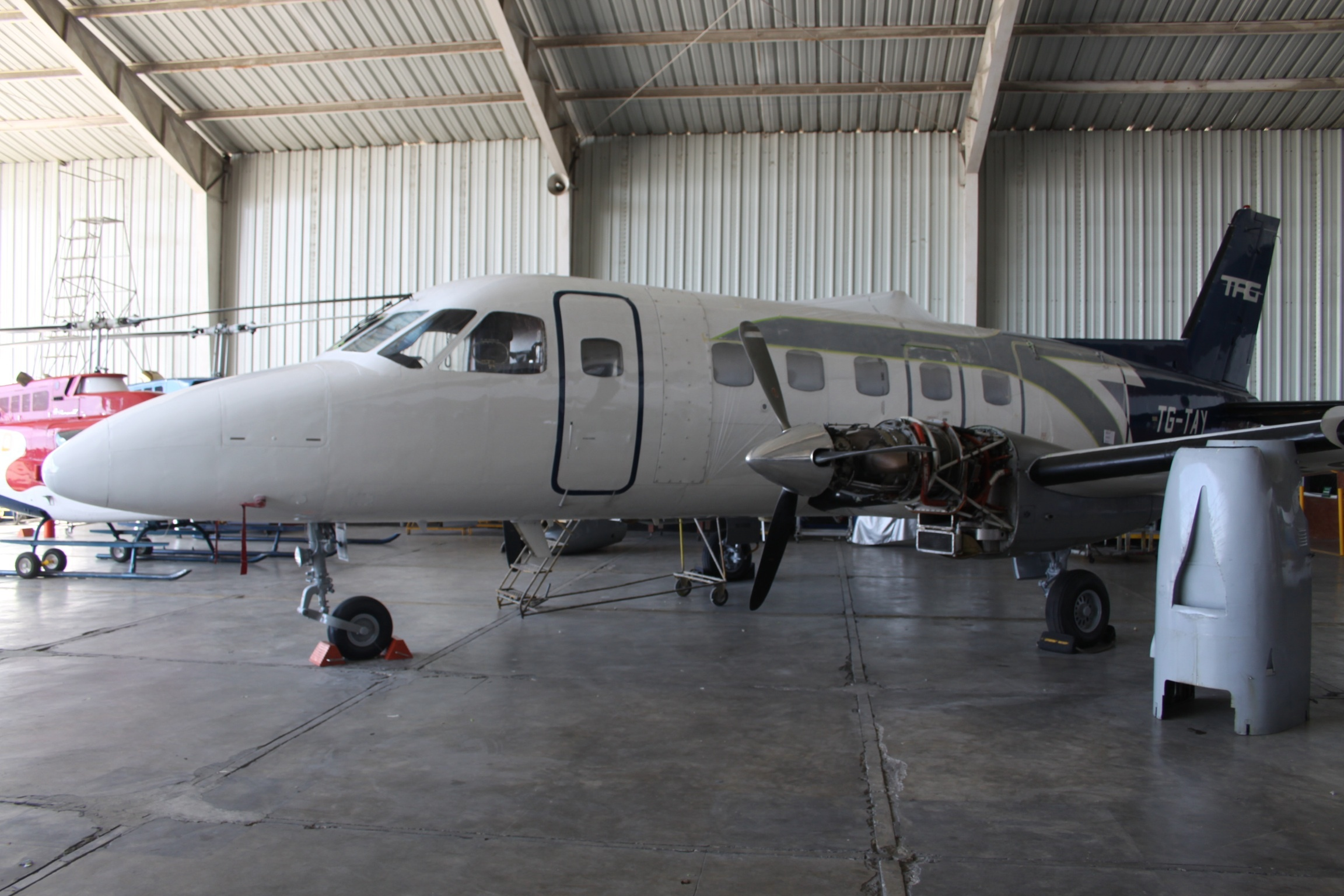
A Bandeirante with its PT6A engine uncovered

Data from Jane's All The World's Aircraft 1988–89

General characteristics

- Crew: 2
- Capacity: 18 passengers
- Length: 15.1 m (49 ft 6 in)
- Wingspan: 15.33 m (50 ft 4 in)
- Height: 4.92 m (16 ft 2 in)
- Wing area: 29.1 m^{2} (313 sq ft)
- Airfoil: root: NACA 23016 mod.; tip: NACA 23012
- Empty weight: 3,590 kg (7,915 lb) empty equipped - passengers

3,393 kg (7,480 lb) empty equipped - cargo

- Max takeoff weight: 5,900 kg (13,007 lb)
- Fuel capacity: 1,308 kg (2,884 lb) / 1,720 L (450 US gal; 380 imp gal) in four integral wing tanks
- Powerplant: 2 × Pratt & Whitney Canada PT6A-34 turboprop engines, 560 kW (750 shp) each
- Propellers: 3-bladed Hartzell HC-B3TN-3C/T10178H-8R, 2.36 m (7 ft 9 in) diameter fully-feathering reversible-pitch constant-speed propellers

Performance

- Cruise speed: 411 km/h (255 mph, 222 kn) maximum at 2,440 m (8,000 ft)
- Economical cruise speed: 341 km/h (212 mph; 184 kn) at 3,050 m (10,000 ft)
- Range: 1,964 km (1,220 mi, 1,060 nmi) econ. cruise + 45 min reserve
- Service ceiling: 6,550 m (21,490 ft)
- Rate of climb: 8.3 m/s (1,630 ft/min)

1.9 m/s (6.2 ft/s) on single engine

- Take-off run: 807 m (2,648 ft) (FAR23.135 / SFAR 41A)
- Landing run: 868 m (2,848 ft) at MLW

== Incidents and accidents ==
- 27 February 1975: a VASP EMB 110 Bandeirante registration PP-SBE operating Flight 640 from São Paulo-Congonhas to Bauru crashed after take-off from Congonhas. All 13 passengers and two crew members died.
- 22 January 1976: a Transbrasil Embraer EMB 110C Bandeirante registration PT-TBD operating Flight 107 from Chapecó to Erechim, crashed upon take-off from Chapecó. Seven of the nine passengers and crew on board died.
- 23 April 1977: Brazilian Air Force, a C-95 Bandeirante registration FAB-2169 crashed upon landing at Natal Air Force Base.
- 3 June 1977: Brazilian Air Force, a C-95 Bandeirante registration FAB-2157 crashed after take-off from Natal Air Force Base. All 18 occupants died.
- 20 June 1977: a Transporte Aéreo Militar Uruguayo EMB110C Bandeirante registration CX-BJE/T584 flying from Montevideo to Salto crashed after striking trees in an orange grove during approach to Salto. The crew of two, as well as three of the 13 passengers died.
- 31 January 1978: a TABA – Transportes Aéreos da Bacia Amazônica EMB 110 Bandeirante registration PT-GKW crashed upon take-off from Eirunepé. The crew of two died but all 14 passengers survived.
- 8 February 1979: a TAM Airlines EMB 110 Bandeirante registration PT-SBB operating a flight from Bauru to São Paulo-Congonhas, while on initial climb from Bauru, struck trees and crashed into flames. All two crew and 16 passengers died.
- 24 February 1981: a VOTEC EMB110P Bandeirante registration PT-GLB flying from Tucuruí to Belém-Val de Cans collided with a ship in dry dock while approaching Belém in rain and high winds. The aircraft subsequently struck two barges and broke in two. The front part crashed onto a tug, and the tail section sank. Only 3 passengers of a total of 14 passengers and crew survived.
- 2 September 1981: a Taxi Aéreo El Venado Embraer EMB-110P1 Bandeirante registration HK-2651 crashed after taking off from Juan José Rondón Airport in Paipa. The aircraft, overloaded, entered a stall, went down and caught fire, killing both pilots and 19 of the 20 passengers.
- 6 November 1982: an Air Ecosse EMB110PI Bandeirante registration G-OAIR flying from Prestwick to Aberdeen lost left engine and shortly thereafter right generator. The pilot and sole occupant made a landing in a field north east of Hatton, Scotland. Aircraft sustained substantial damage.
- 7 October 1983: a TAM Airlines EMB 110C Bandeirante registration PP-SBH flying from Campo Grande and Urubupungá to Araçatuba struck the ground just short of the runway threshold after missing the approach at Araçatuba Airport twice. Seven crew and passengers died.
- 18 April 1984: two VOTEC EMB 110 Bandeirante registrations PT-GJZ and PT-GKL collided on air, while on approach to land at Imperatriz. PT-GJZ was flying from São Luís to Imperatriz and crashed on ground killing all its 18 passengers and crew. PT-GKL was flying from Belém-Val de Cans to Imperatriz and its pilot was able to make an emergency landing on Tocantins river. One passenger of its 17-passenger and crew died.
- 28 June 1984: a TAM Airlines EMB 110C Bandeirante registration PP-SBC operating a chartered flight by Petrobras from Rio de Janeiro–Galeão to Macaé flew into São João Hill while descending through rain and clouds over the Municipality of São Pedro da Aldeia. All 16 passengers and 2 crew died. The passengers were journalists of well-known Brazilian networks who were preparing a special report about the Campos Basin oil fields.
- 19 November 1984: A EuroAir EMB 110 Bandeirante G-HGGS crashed into the side of a hill 6.5 mi (10.5 km) south of Inverness Airport shortly after take-off. The pilot was killed in the crash and the aircraft damaged beyond repair.
- 6 December 1984: PBA Flight 1039, using an EMB 110 Bandeirante (registration N96PB) crashed shortly after taking off from Jacksonville International Airport in Jacksonville, Florida, United States. All 11 passengers and both pilots died.
- 23 January 1985, AIRES Colombia Flight 585, registered as HK-2638, crashed into a mountain named Cerro Tesorito as the plane veered off the route, killing all 17 on board.
- 23 June 1985: a TABA – Transportes Aéreos da Bacia Amazônica EMB 110 Bandeirante registration PT-GJN flying from Juara to Cuiabá, while on approach to land at Cuiabá, had technical problems on engine number 1. An emergency landing was attempted but the aircraft stalled and crashed 1 km short of the runway. All 17 occupants died.
- 9 October 1985: a Nordeste EMB110C Bandeirante registration PT-GKA operating a cargo flight from Vitória da Conquista to Salvador da Bahia crashed during initial climb from Vitória da Conquista after flying unusually low. The two crew members died.
- 6 February 1987: A Talair MB 110P2 registration P2-RDM ditched into the sea in poor weather short of Hoskins Airport en route from Rabaul on the Island of New Britain in Papua New Guinea. Three of the 17 on board survived.
- 1 March 1988: Comair Flight 206, using an EMB 110, crashed in Johannesburg, killing all 17 occupants. One source suggests that this incident was caused by an explosive device, carried by a passenger employed as a mineworker who had recently taken out a substantial insurance policy.
- 24 May 1988: Atlantic Southeast Airlines Flight 2366, an Embraer 110 departing Lawton–Fort Sill Regional Airport, Oklahoma, crashed during takeoff from runway 35 due to failure of no. 1 engine. After climbing to 50–100 feet the aircraft lost altitude, struck the ground, and part of the aircraft caught fire. It appeared that the compressor turbine blade of no. 1 engine had separated. No fatalities.
- 14 November 1988: Oy Wasawings Ab flight to Seinäjoki crashed during landing in Ilmajoki, Finland. Resulted in six deaths and six injuries.
- 20 September 1990: an EMB110P1 Bandeirante registration PT-FAW belonging to the Government of Pernambuco, flying from Fernando de Noronha to Recife, crashed into the sea shortly after take-off. All 12 crew and passengers died.
- 8 October 1991: an EMB110P1 Bandeirante, registration N731A, being ferried from Springfield, Missouri, to Southend, England, descended due to icing conditions and struck an ice sheet at a height of 5125 feet near Narsarsuaq, Greenland. All three crew members survived and were rescued by a helicopter of the Danish Navy.
- 11 November 1991: a Nordeste EMB110P1 Bandeirante registration PT-SCU operating Flight 115 from Recife to Maceió, during an initial climb had an engine failure followed by fire. The aircraft crashed on populated area. All 13 occupants of the aircraft and 2 persons on the ground died.
- 3 February 1992: a Nordeste EMB 110 Bandeirante registration PT-TBB en route from Salvador da Bahia to Guanambi descended below minimum levels in bad weather and crashed on a hill hidden by clouds near Caetité. All 12 passengers and crew aboard died.
- 13 January 1993: A Titan Airways cargo flight crashed into a hill near Sellafield, en route from London Southend Airport to Glasgow International Airport. The flight used G-ZAPE, a 110P, and both pilots were killed in the crash.
- 26 October 1993: A Brazilian Air Force patrol P-95 (EMB 111 Bandeirante Patrulha) registration FAB-2290 that departed from Canoas Air Force Base crashed into the ocean near Angra dos Reis while flying in bad weather conditions. All crew of 3 died.
- 19 July 1994: Alas Chiricanas Flight 00901 Panamanian domestic airline ALAS, registration HP-1202AC using an EMB 110P1, crashed after a bomb exploded in the cabin killing 21, twelve Jewish businessmen were among the passengers.
- 24 May 1995: G-OEAA, an EMB-110-P1 operated by UK domestic airline Knight Air Flight 816 between Leeds and Aberdeen entered a steeply descending spiral dive, broke up in flight and crashed into farmland at Dunkeswick Moor near Leeds. All 12 occupants were killed. The probable cause of the accident was the failure of one or both artificial horizon instruments. There was no standby artificial horizon installed (as there was no airworthiness requirement for one on this aircraft) and the accident report concluded that this left the crew without a single instrument available for assured attitude reference or simple means of determining which flight instruments had failed. The aircraft entered a spiral dive from which the pilot, who was likely to have become spatially disoriented, was unable to recover.
- 13 September 1996: a Helisul EMB 110 Bandeirante registration PT-WAV operating a cargo flight from Porto Alegre to Joinville collided with a hill and crashed during final approach to land at Joinville. The crew of two died.
- 17 November 1996: Brazilian Air Force, a P-95 Bandeirante registration FAB-7102 flying from Salvador da Bahia Air Force Base to Natal Air Force Base had an accident in the vicinity of Caruaru. Four Brazilian Air Force Bandeirantes were flying on formation from Salvador to Natal when the tail of FAB-7102 was struck by the propeller of another aircraft. It crashed after control of the aircraft was lost. All nine occupants died.
- 24 July 1999: an Air Fiji EMB 110 Bandeirante registration DQ-AFN on a domestic flight from Nausori to Nadi in the Fiji Islands operating as Air Fiji Flight 121 crashed on a slope of a ridge. The aircraft had apparently descended below the 5,400 feet (1,600 m) safety altitude until the right wing struck a tree on a ridgeline at 1,300 feet (400 m) altitude. The Bandeirante then broke up and impacted the slope of a ridge 1.3 km (0.81 mi) further on. The tail section and right wing were found 150 m (490 ft) from the main wreckage. Weather at 05:00 was good: nil wind, 40 km (25 mi) visibility, scattered clouds at 2,200 feet (670 m) and an insignificant small shower band. Investigation revealed that the captain had insufficient rest prior to the flight and that he had consumed an above-therapeutic level of antihistamine prior to the flight, which would have degraded his ability to safely pilot the aircraft. Also Air Fiji's published standard operating procedures were inadequate for the Bandeirante aircraft.
- 26 December 2002: Brazilian Air Force, an EMB 110 Bandeirante registration FAB-2292 en route from São Paulo-Campo de Marte to Florianópolis Air Force Base, crashed while trying to carry out an emergency landing at Curitiba-Afonso Pena. Reportedly, both engines had quit. The airplane had taken off with insufficient fuel on board to complete the flight to Florianópolis. Three passengers and crew of the 16 aboard died.
- 8 November 2005: an EMB 110, operated by Wiggins Airways, registration N7801Q, flying a cargo route from Manchester-Boston Regional Airport to Bangor International Airport suffered an engine failure shortly after takeoff, causing the aircraft to bank and fall to the ground, landing inside of a Walmart garden center 1.4 km (0.87 mi) away from Runway 17/35. The pilot was the only occupant and survived the crash, and the aircraft was written off.
- 7 February 2009: an EMB 110, operated by Manaus Aerotáxi, registration PT-SEA, flying a domestic route in Brazil from Coari to Manaus (Amazonas) struggled in bad weather conditions and crashed 80 km (50 mi) from Manaus killing 24 passengers. 4 survivors were reported.
- 3 July 2013: An EMB 110, operated by Batair Cargo, registration ZS-NVB, en route from Lanseria Airport in Johannesburg for Lubumbashi in the Democratic Republic of the Congo, crashed while attempting to land in Francistown, Botswana. The pilots had planned to land and refuel but thick mist on the ground caused them to miss the landing strip on their first pass. They called in to the control tower to notify that they would make a second pass because they could see the landing strip, but never did. The wreckage was found two hours later about 10 km (6.2 mi) from the airport. The plane crashed with no survivors.
- 17 November 2022: An EMB 110, registration C6-CAB, operated by LeAir Charter Services, flying from Cap-Haïtien International Airport, Haiti, to Lynden Pindling International Airport, Nassau, Bahamas, was substantially damaged when the nosewheel collapsed and it skidded off of the runway when landing at Nassau. During the landing approach, the crew observed problems with the landing gear. After performing a low pass so that the landing gear could be observed by the control tower, the flight circled for several minutes to burn off fuel before another approach to landing, during which the nosewheel collapsed. No injuries were reported.
- 16 September 2023: An Embraer EMB 110 Bandeirante carrying 12 passengers and 2 crew from Eduardo Gomes International Airport veered off the runway at Barcelos Airport. All 14 occupants were killed. The aircraft was registered as PT-SOG.

== See also ==
Related development

- Embraer EMB 120 Brasilia
- Embraer EMB 121 Xingu

Aircraft of comparable role, configuration, and era

- Dornier 228
- de Havilland Canada DHC-6 Twin Otter
- FMA IA 50 Guaraní II
- Let L-410 Turbolet
