= Eirunepé Airport =

Amaury Feitosa Tomaz Airport Aeroporto Amaury Feitosa Tomaz
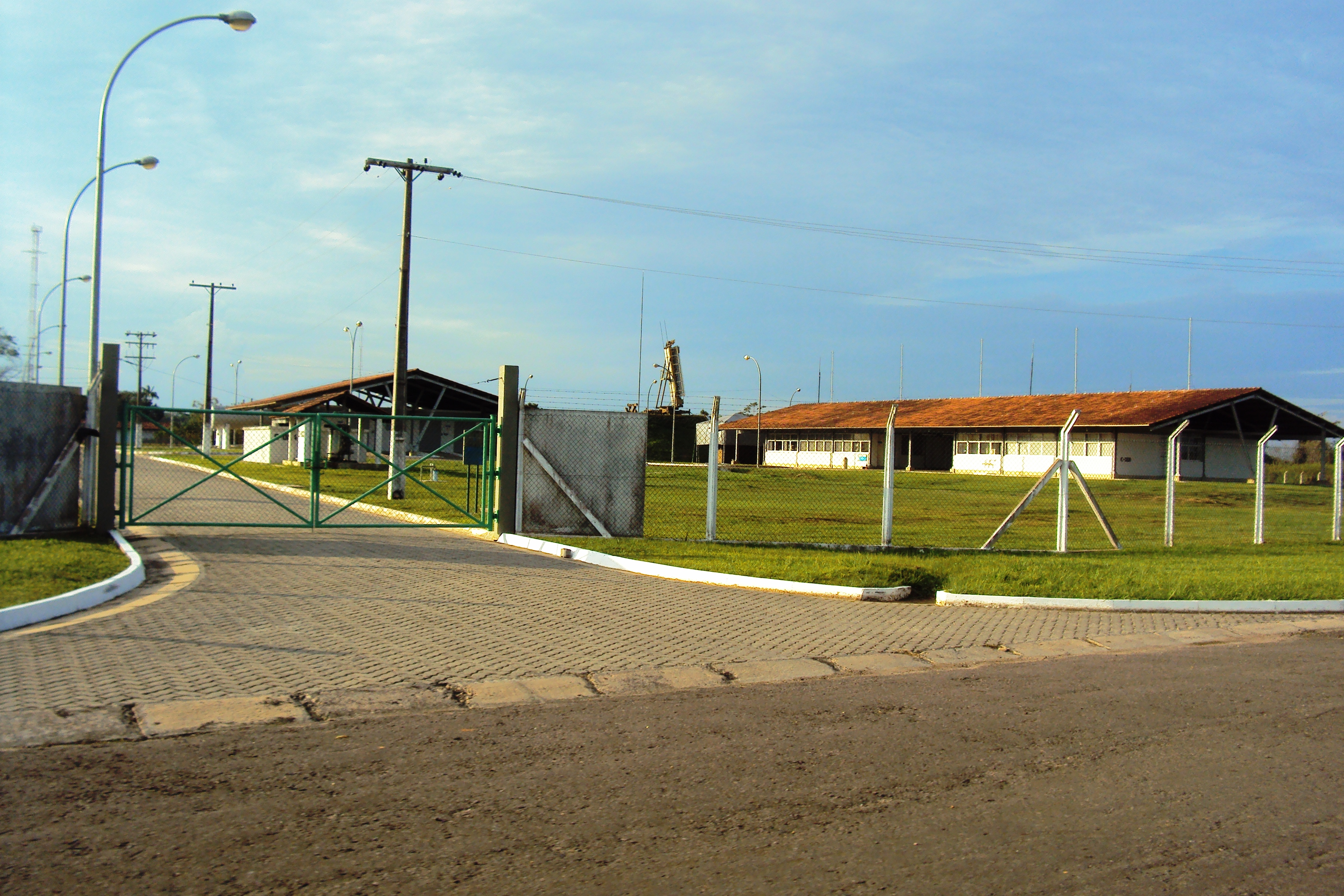
- IATA: ERN; ICAO: SWEI; LID: AM0009

Summary
- Airport type: Public
- Serves: Eirunepé
- Time zone: BRT−2 (UTC−05:00)
- Elevation AMSL: 122 m (400 ft)
- Coordinates: 06°38′15″S 069°52′47″W

Map
- Location in Brazil

Runways
Direction	Length		Surface
Direction	m	ft	Surface
16/34	2,300	7,546	Asphalt
- Sources: ANAC, DECEA

Amaury Feitosa Tomaz Airport (IATA: ERN, ICAO: SWEI) is the airport serving Eirunepé, Brazil.

== Accidents and incidents ==
- 31 January 1978: a TABA – Transportes Aéreos da Bacia Amazônica Embraer EMB 110 Bandeirante registration PT-GKW crashed upon take-off from Eirunepé. The crew of 2 died but all 14 passengers survived.

== Access ==
The airport is located 4 km (2 mi) from downtown Eirunepé.

== See also ==
- List of airports in Brazil
