= Flight 751 =

Flight 751 may refer to:

- Real Transportes Aéreos Flight 751, collided with another aircraft on 25 February 1960
- Scandinavian Airlines Flight 751, crashed on 27 December 1991
- Pegasus Airlines Flight 751, hijack attempted on 7 February 2014
