= Afonsos Air Force Base =

Air base of the Brazilian Air Force

- Base Aérea dos Afonsos
- Rio de Janeiro, Rio de Janeiro in Brazil
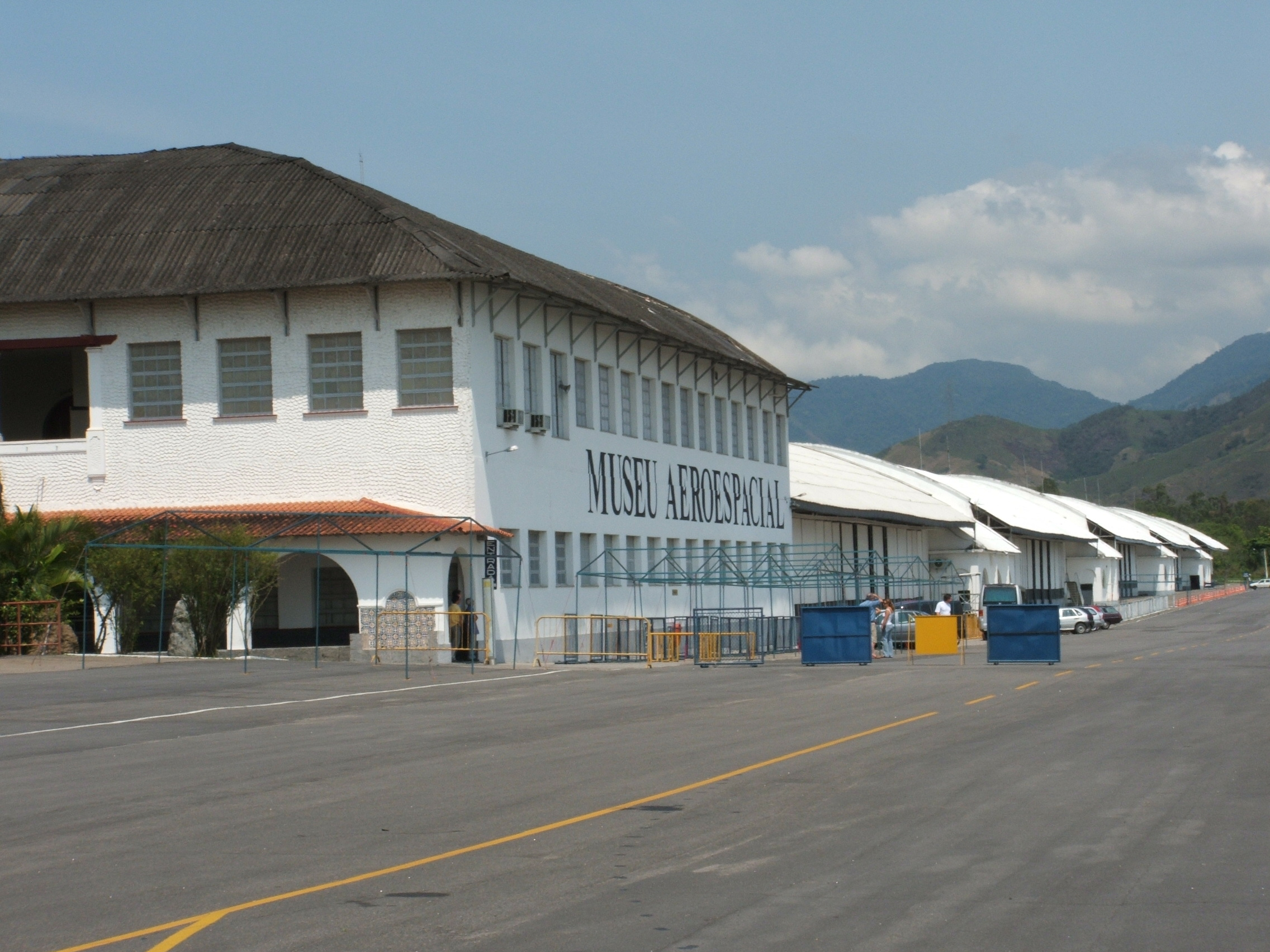
- Aerospace Museum at Afonsos in 2005

Site information
- Type: Air Force Base
- Code: BAAF
- Owner: Brazilian Air Force
- Controlled by: Brazilian Air Force
- Open to the public: Yes
- Website: www.fab.mil.br/organizacoes/mostra/33/BASE%20A%C3%89REA%20DOS%20AFONSOS

Location
- Location in Brazil SBAF (Rio de Janeiro (state)) SBAF (Brazil)
- Coordinates: 22°52′32″S 043°23′04″W

Site history
- Built: 1912
- In use: 1941-present

Airfield information
- Identifiers: ICAO: SBAF, LID: RJ9002
- Elevation: 34 metres (112 ft) AMSL
Runways
Direction	Length and surface
08/26	2,001 metres (6,565 ft) Concrete

Afonsos Air Force Base – BAAF (ICAO: SBAF) is a base of the Brazilian Air Force, located in the district of Marechal Hermes, in Rio de Janeiro, Brazil.

== History ==
In October 1911 the first aeronautical organization was created in Brazil: the Aeroclube do Brasil (Flying club of Brazil). The site chosen for its location was given the name of "Campo dos Afonsos" (Afonsos' Field) and an airfield was opened on December 12, 1912.

On February 2, 1914, a Military Aviation School was opened at the site. The school was a partnership with the Italian Army, but due to the beginning of hostilities related to World War I, it was short-lived and finally closed on July 18 of the same year.

On January 29, 1919, a French Military mission founded a new school of military aviation at Campo dos Afonsos. Because of this school, the Aeroclube do Brasil was forced to leave the location. For years they had no home but in 1936 it was re-opened at the Manguinhos Airport.

Between 1931 and 1936, before a dedicated new facility was opened at Bartolomeu de Gusmão Airport, the Graf Zeppelin docked at Campo dos Afonsos during its stop-overs in Rio de Janeiro.

In 1941, Campo dos Afonsos became of exclusive use of the Brazilian Air Force and the new Air Force Base was commissioned as Afonsos Air Force Base.

Today the base is home to the University of the Brazilian Air Force, the institution of higher education of the Brazilian Air Force, and of the Aerospace Museum.

On December 12, 2012 the aerodrome celebrated its centennial anniversary.

== Units ==
Since January 2017 there are no permanent flying units assigned Afonsos Air Force Base. Whenever needed, the aerodrome is used as a support facility to other air units of the Brazilian Air Force, Navy and Army.

Former Units
February 1958 – 2013: 1st Squadron of the 1st Troops Transportation Group (1º/1ºGTT) Coral. The squadron was moved to Galeão Air Force Base.
November 1961 – 2013: 2nd Squadron of the 1st Troops Transportation Group (2º/1ºGTT) Cascavel. The squadron was moved to Galeão Air Force Base.
September 1980–January 2017: 3rd Squadron of the 8th Aviation Group (3º/8ºGAv) Puma. The squadron was moved to Santa Cruz Air Force Base.

== Accidents and incidents ==
- 27 June 1974: Brazilian Air Force, a Fairchild C-119 Flying Boxcar registration FAB-2301 crashed in the vicinity of Afonsos Air Force Base while operating a training flight. Two of the four occupants died.
- 26 March 1987: Brazilian Air Force, an Embraer EMB 110 Bandeirante registration FAB-2324 struck a hillside and crashed shortly after takeoff. The three crew members died.

== Access ==
The base is located approximately 30 km from Rio de Janeiro downtown in the district of Marechal Hermes.

== Gallery ==
This gallery displays aircraft that have been based at Afonsos. The gallery is not comprehensive.

de Havilland C-115 Buffalo (FAB)

Fairchid C-119G Flying Boxcar

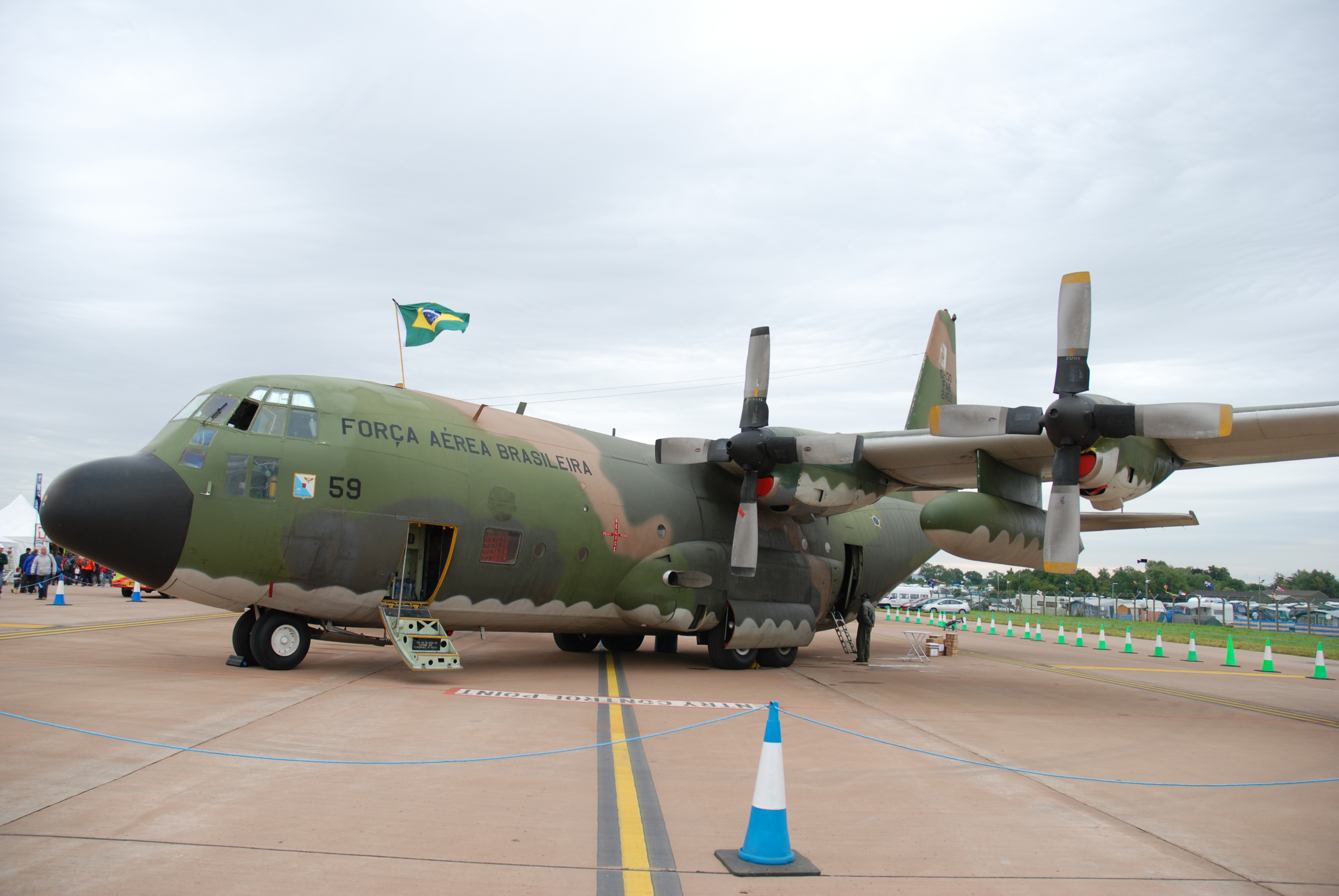
Lockheed C-130 Hércules (FAB)

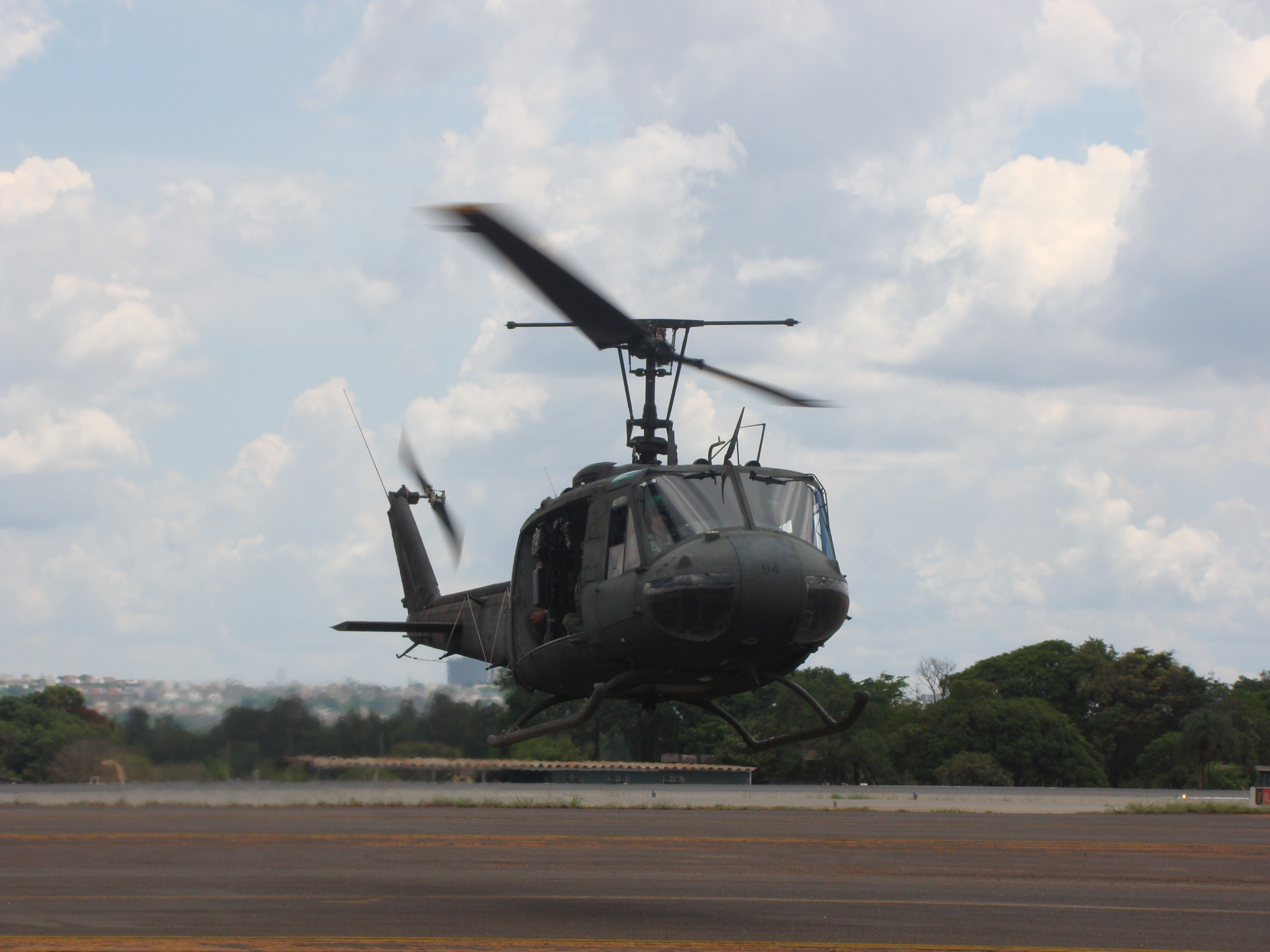
Bell H-1H Iroquois

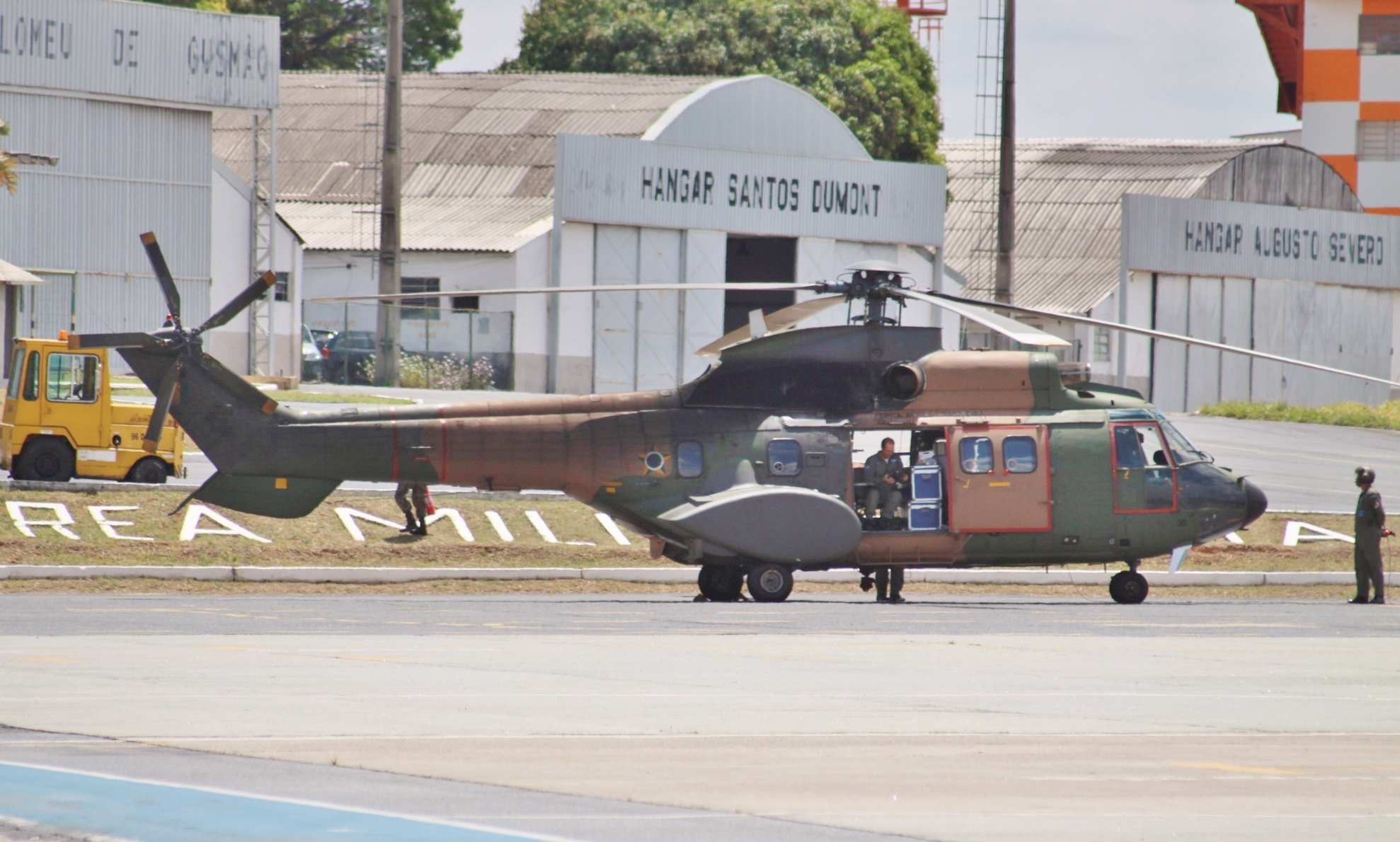
Helibras H-34 Super Puma (FAB)

== See also ==
- List of Brazilian military bases
