= Rio de Janeiro mid-air collision =

Rio de Janeiro mid-air collision may refer to:

- 1960 Rio de Janeiro mid-air collision, which killed 61 people
- 2026 Rio de Janeiro mid-air collision, which killed six people
