= Bartolomeu de Gusmão Airport =

Former commercial airport that served Rio de Janeiro, Brazil (1936–1942)

Bartolomeu de Gusmão Airport Aeroporto Bartolomeu de Gusmão
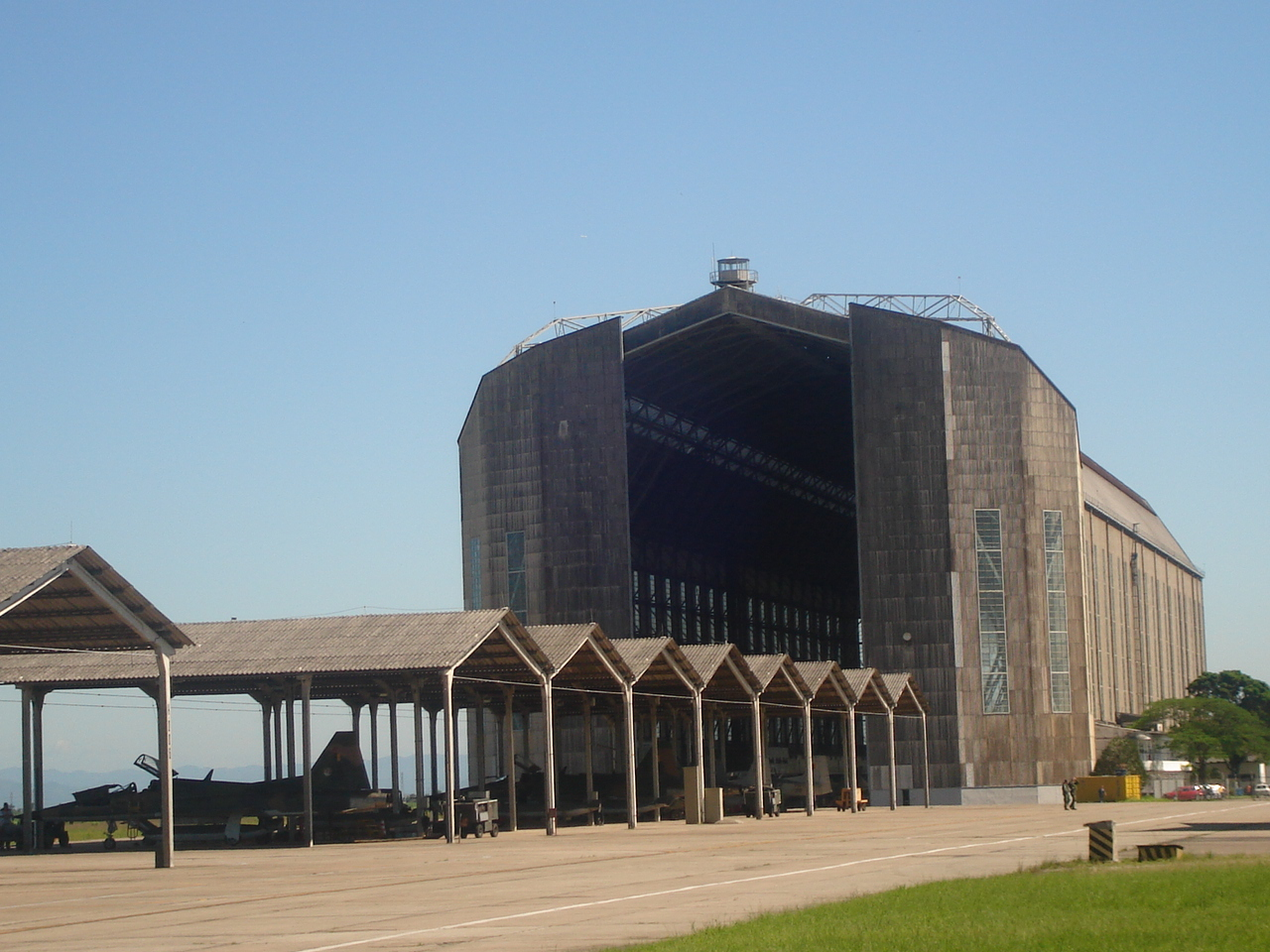
- South door of the Zeppelin Hangar
- IATA: SNZ; ICAO: SBSC

Summary
- Airport type: Public
- Owner/Operator: Luftschiffbau Zeppelin
- Serves: Rio de Janeiro
- Opened: 26 December 1936
- Passenger services ceased: 12 February 1942
- Elevation AMSL: 3 m (9.8 ft)
- Coordinates: 22°55′56″S 043°43′09″W

Map
- Location within greater Rio de Janeiro SNZ (Brazil)

Runways
Direction	Length		Surface
Direction	m	ft	Surface
05/23	2,739	8,986	Asphalt
- Sources: World Aero Data

Bartolomeu de Gusmão Airport (IATA: SNZ, ICAO: SBSC) was a Brazilian airport built to handle the operations with the rigid airships Graf Zeppelin and Hindenburg. The airport was named after Bartolomeu Lourenço de Gusmão (1685–1724), a Portuguese priest born in Brazil who did research about transportation with balloons.

== History ==
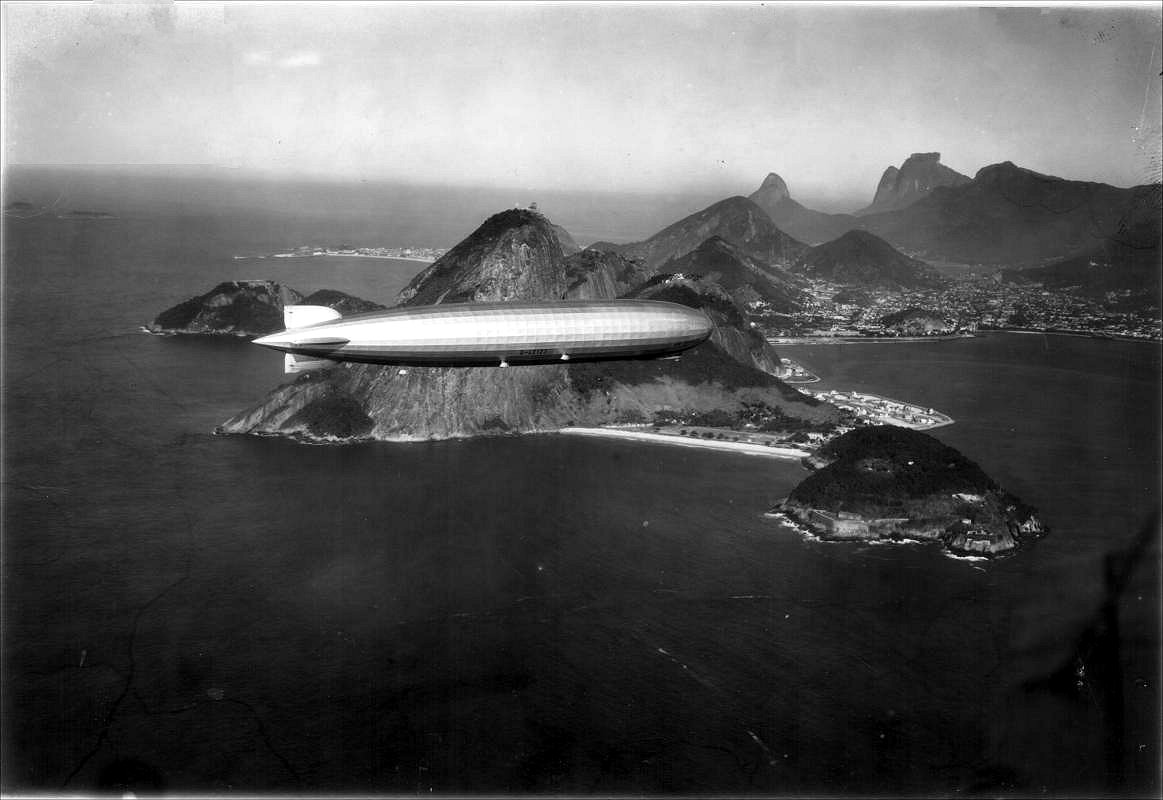
LZ 127 Graf Zeppelin over Rio de Janeiro

Between 1931 and 1937, Deutsche Luft Hansa had regular flights between Germany and Brazil, which were operated by Luftschiffbau Zeppelin using its rigid airships Graf Zeppelin and Hindenburg. Rio de Janeiro was the final stop, where passengers could connect with aircraft services to Southern Brazil, Uruguay, Argentina, Chile and Bolivia operated by Syndicato Condor, the Brazilian subsidiary of Deutsche Luft Hansa. During its five years of regular scheduled summer season intercontinental commercial airship service between Germany and South America, the hangar was used only nine times: four by the LZ-127 Graf Zeppelin and five by the LZ-129 Hindenburg. Assembled from parts brought from Germany, the construction was subsidized by the Brazilian government.

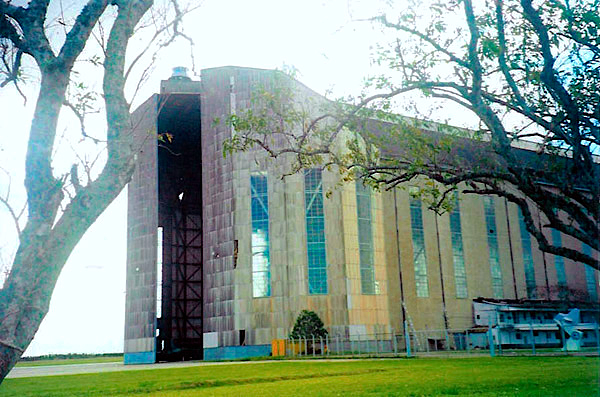
Zeppelin Hangar.

The airport was inaugurated on December 26, 1936, by President Getúlio Vargas, in the presence of the German Ambassador Schmidt Elskop. Before this, rigid airships were docked at Campo dos Afonsos.

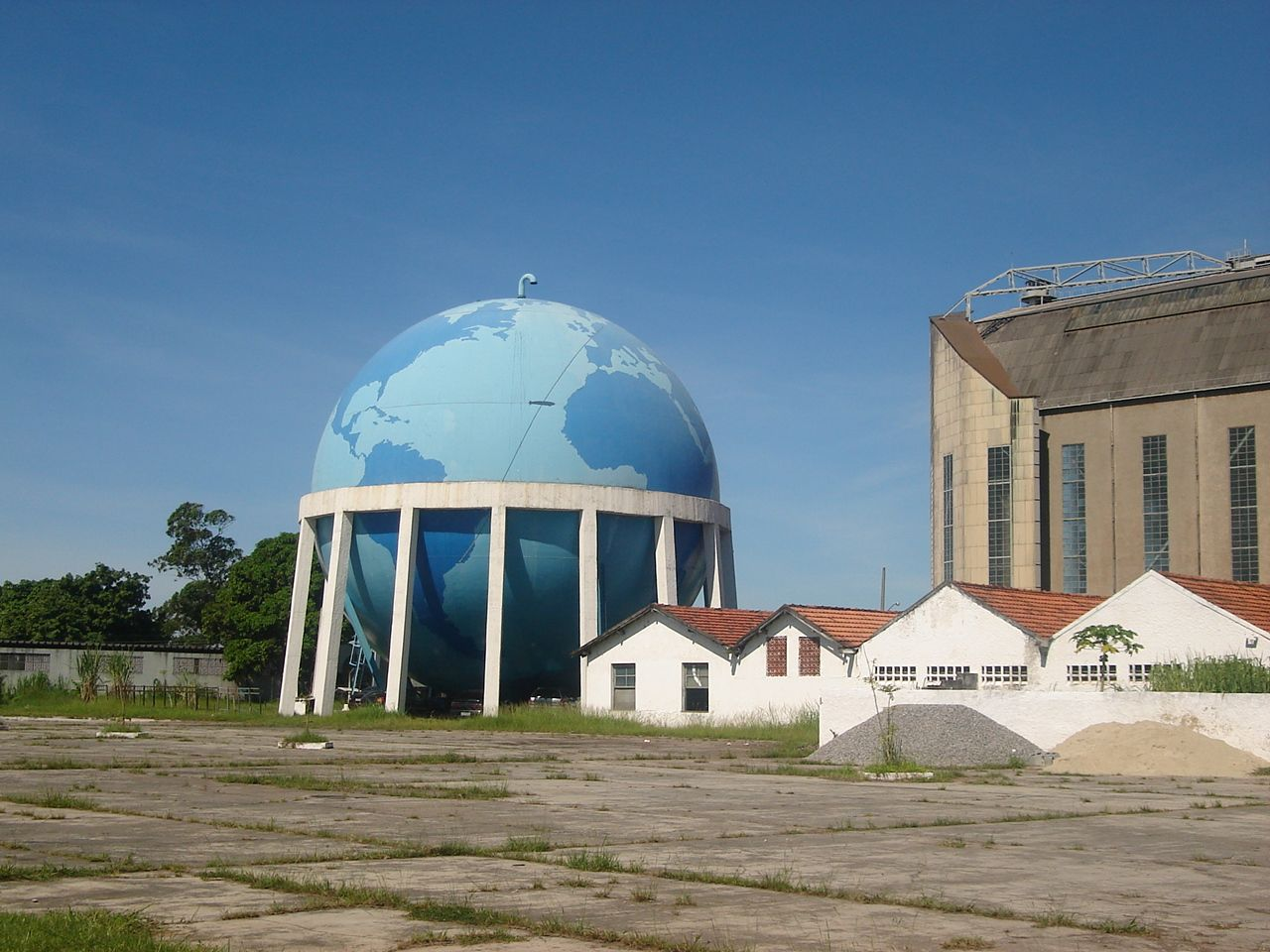
Tank for manufacture and storage of hydrogen to supply Zeppelins.

The new airport consisted of an airfield, a hangar, a customs house, an office building, a radio-operations building, 5 bedrooms for workers, crew-lodgings, a work and storage house, a hydrogen factory, a plant to mix hydrogen with butane, and a branch line connecting the complex to the main railway line to downtown Rio de Janeiro 54 km away. The whole complex was built by the Luftschiffbau Zeppelin and are partially still in use by the Brazilian Air Force, which occupies the site.

The hangar is an original surviving example of a structure built to accommodate rigid airships and the only Zeppelin airship hangar which remains a hangar. Because of its historical importance, it was listed as a National Heritage Site on March 14, 1999.

As a consequence of the Hindenburg disaster on May 6, 1937, at Lakehurst Air Naval Station in New Jersey, US, the Luftschiffbau Zeppelin requested to the Brazilian Government on June 17, 1937, the suspension of services. After that no more civil operations were handled at this facility.

On February 12, 1942, six months before Brazil declared war against the Axis, the airport was taken over by the Brazilian Air Force Ministry and became a base of the Brazilian Air Force and therefore with exclusive military use. It is located in the neighborhood of Santa Cruz in the western region of Rio de Janeiro. The name of the facility was changed to Santa Cruz Air Force Base on January 16, 1943, even though, according to a law prescribing rules for the naming of airports of July 21, 1953, the name of the facility could officially and exceptionally be maintained as Bartolomeu de Gusmão Airport.

== Hangar ==
=== Characteristics ===
The hangar has large dimensions: 274 meters long, 58 meters high, and 58 meters wide. Oriented in the north–south direction, its north gate, 28 meters wide and 26 meters high served only for ventilation and exit from the mooring mast, and was opened manually. The south gate, the main one, opens to the full height of the hangar and has two parts weighing 80 tons each. These gates were opened thanks to powerful electric motors, or manually. The electrical installations were covered with shielding to prevent the occurrence of any sparks, which could cause a catastrophic fire in the airships. At the top of the hangar, at a height of 61 meters, there is a command tower, from which one can see the entire surrounding area, from Sepetiba to the Guandu River.

=== The hangar today ===
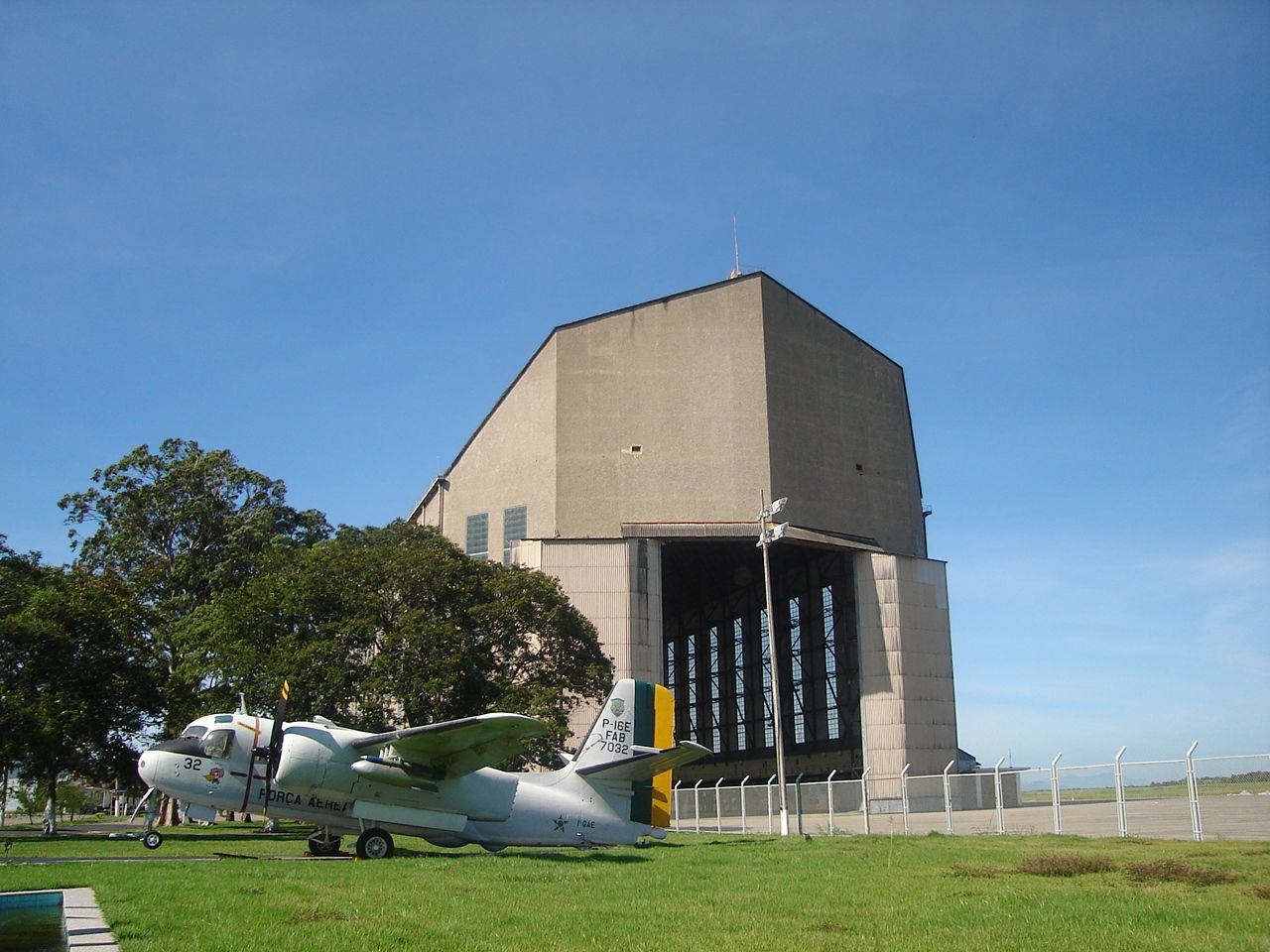
North hangar gate.

The hangar building of the Santa Cruz Air Base has been listed by the National Historic and Artistic Heritage Institute (IPHAN) since 1998 and received the listing registration #550. It may be recognized by law (PL 422/2009 of the City Council of Rio de Janeiro) as one of the seven wonders of the historic neighborhood of Santa Cruz, for its touristic and socio-cultural relevance.

The structure was used as one of the sets for the film For All - O Trampolim da Vitória, a 1997 Brazilian film directed by Buza Ferraz and Luiz Carlos Lacerda, which depicts the Natal Air Base in 1943. It was also shown in the documentary Senta a pua! by Erik de Castro in 1999, besides being the target of advertising campaigns and TV programs. In 2009, a bill was forwarded for recognition by the City Council of Rio de Janeiro as one of the elected seven wonders of the historic neighborhood of Santa Cruz.

== Access ==
The airport is located 54 km (34 mi) from Rio de Janeiro downtown.

== See also ==
- Santa Cruz Air Force Base
- Zeppelin Tower
