= Zeppelin Tower =

Brazilian airship station

Coordinates: 08°04′42″S 34°55′34″W

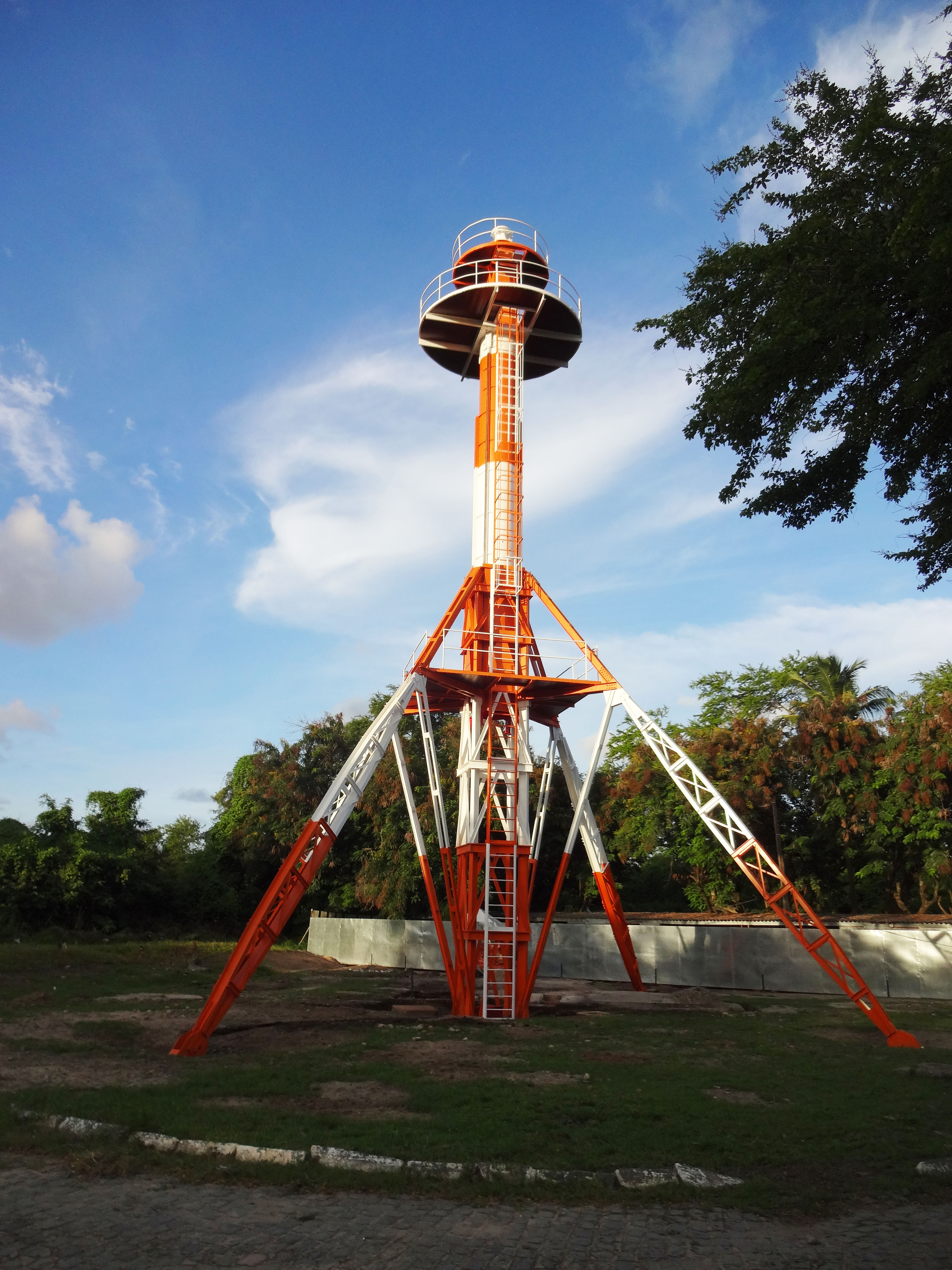
The Zeppelin Tower was the first aeronautical station for airships in South America, and is the only object of its kind still standing in the world.

The Zeppelin Tower (Portuguese: Torre do Zeppelin) is located in the neighborhood of Jiquiá, formerly Campo do Jiquiá, in the city of Recife, state of Pernambuco, Brazil. It was the first aeronautical station for airships in South America, and is the only object of its kind still standing in the world.

== History ==
Between 1930 and 1938, Recife was one of the cities in the Americas with a non-stop connection to Europe, especially to Germany. The city was the Zeppelin's first stop in America after it left Europe.

The Zeppelin Tower is a former docking station for the Zeppelin airships, which made their trips to Recife from 1930 onwards. In 1930, the LZ 127 Graf Zeppelin made its first trip to Brazil, arriving in the city of Recife on May 22. Due to the lack of adequate facilities at Campo dos Afonsos, in the city of Rio de Janeiro, the Graf Zeppelin docked in Recife and continued its journey to Rio de Janeiro. Air ticket sales were controlled by the Syndicato Condor.

On December 26, 1936, the mooring facility in Rio de Janeiro was inaugurated, with a mooring tower, brought from Germany, and a gigantic hangar. This was the start of a regular airline service between Rio de Janeiro and Frankfurt, Germany, with a stopover in Recife. However, in 1938, the line's operations were terminated. The hangar, that still exists, is now the Santa Cruz Air Force Base.

During this period, two airships went to Pernambuco: the LZ-127 (Graf Zeppelin), which made exactly 252 trips with the state as destination or departure, and the LZ-129 (Hindenburg), which was larger but made fewer trips.

In the 1980s, the Zeppelin Tower underwent restoration.

== Design ==
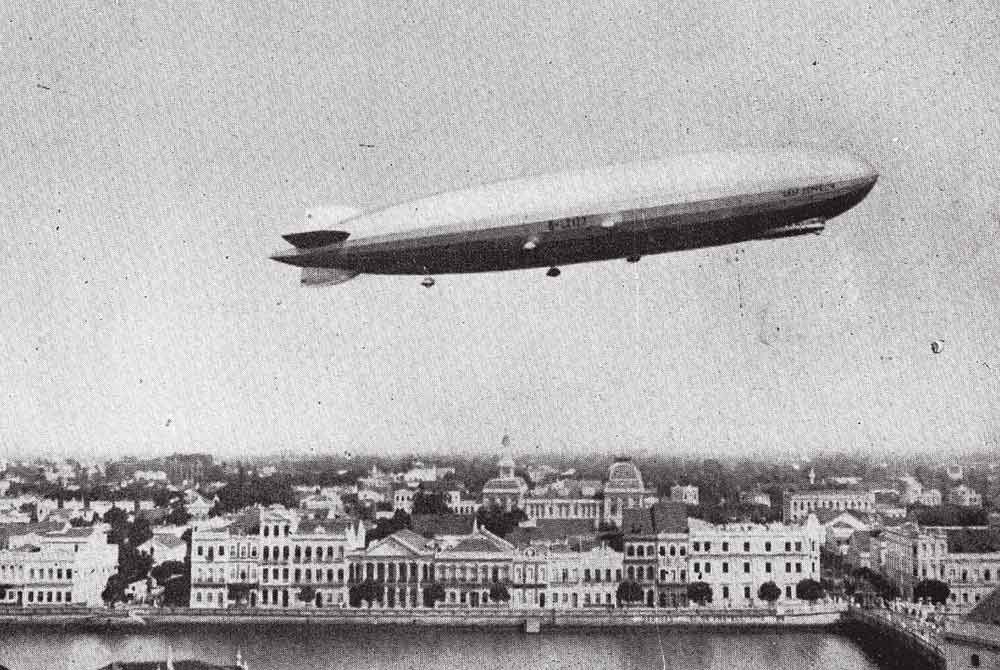
The Graf Zeppelin flying over Recife in the 1930s.

The tower, designed in 1930 with a height of 16.5 meters and more than three tons, was replaced in 1936 by one of 19.5 meters. The new metal structure was reinforced to receive the LZ-129 (Hindenburg), which weighed more than two hundred tons.

== Current situation ==
In 2013, the tower was restored by artist and restorer Jobson Figueiredo, along with the World War II weapons bunkers located in Jiquiá Park. The restoration gave back to the tower its original characteristics. Nowadays, it is the only Zeppelin airship mooring tower in the world preserved in its original structure.

== See also ==
- Luftschiffbau Zeppelin
- Airship
- Zeppelin
