= Santos Dumont Airport =

Airport in Rio de Janeiro, Brazil

Santos Dumont Airport Aeroporto Santos Dumont

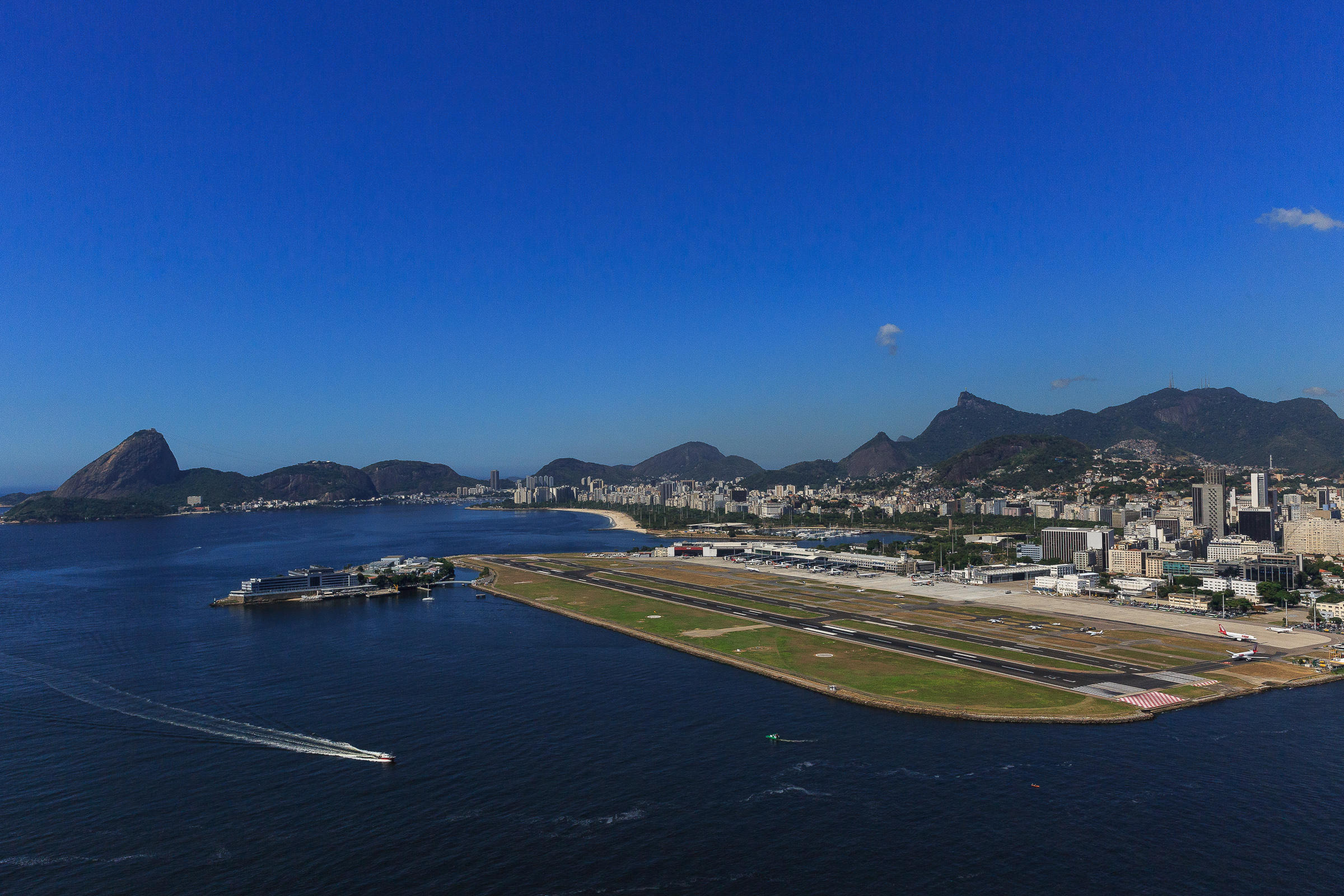
- IATA: SDU; ICAO: SBRJ; LID: RJ0002

Summary
- Airport type: Public / Military
- Operator: ARSA (1973–1987); Infraero (1987–present)
- Serves: Rio de Janeiro
- Opened: 30 November 1936; 89 years ago
- Focus city for: Azul Brazilian Airlines; Gol Linhas Aéreas; LATAM Brasil
- Time zone: BRT (UTC−03:00)
- Elevation AMSL: 3 m (9.8 ft)
- Coordinates: 22°54′36″S 043°09′45″W
- Website: www4.infraero.gov.br/aeroporto-santos-dumont/

Map
- Location within greater Rio de Janeiro SDU (Rio de Janeiro (state)) SDU (Brazil)

Runways
Direction	Length		Surface
Direction	m	ft	Surface
02R/20L	1,323	4,341	Asphalt
02L/20R	1,260	4,134	Asphalt

Statistics (2025)
- Passengers: 6,201,200 ▲1%
- Aircraft operations: 72,223 ▲1%
- Metric tonnes of cargo: 6,288 ▲34%
- Statistics: Infraero; Sources: Airport Website, ANAC, DECEA

Santos Dumont Airport (IATA: SDU, ICAO: SBRJ) is the second major airport serving Rio de Janeiro, Brazil. It is more of a domestic hub, with Galeão International Airport serving international flights after 2023.

It is one of the ten airports in the country with the most air traffic, and is located adjacent to Rio de Janeiro's financial center. It is named after the Brazilian aviation pioneer Alberto Santos Dumont (1873–1932), and is operated by Infraero.

== History ==
The Seaplane terminal on the day of its dedication (November 30, 1936).

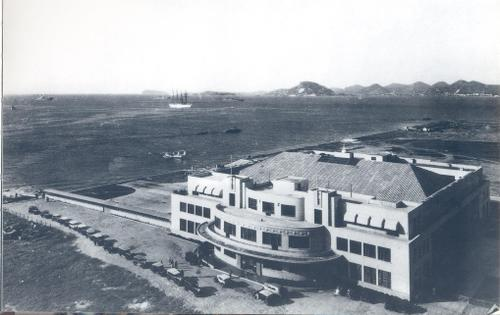
Panair Terminal in the 1940s

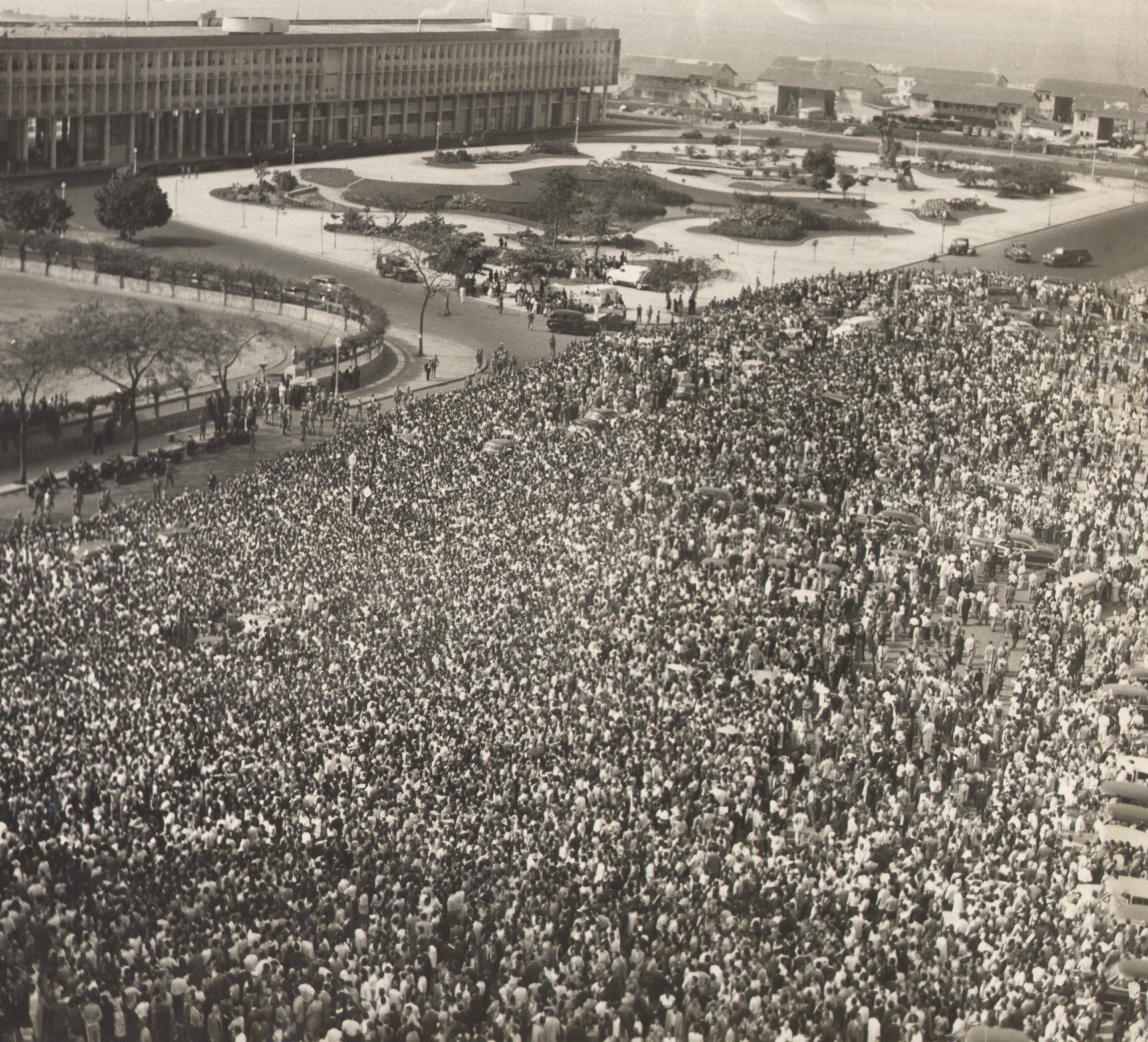
Crowds gather in front of the airport during the transport of President Getúlio Vargas' body from Rio for burial in São Borja, 26 August 1954

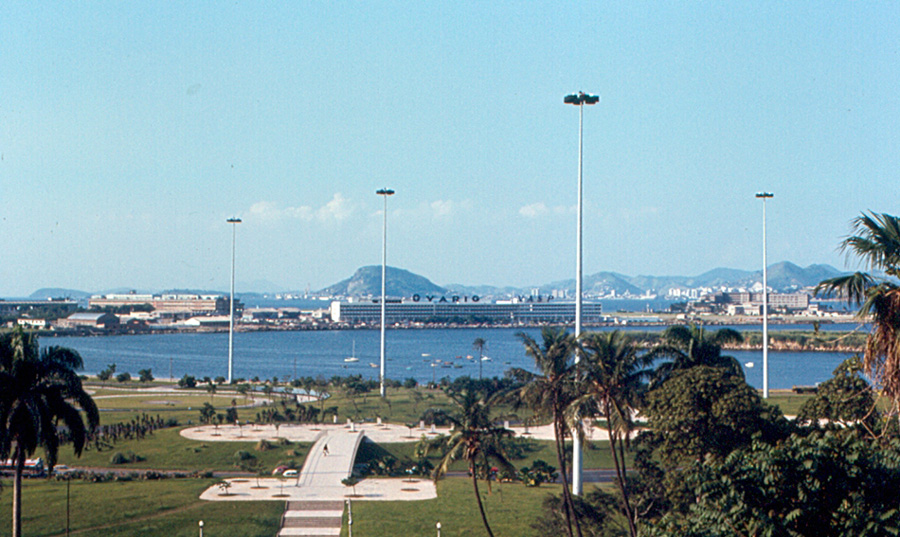
View of Santos Dumont in 1971 with Varig headquarters

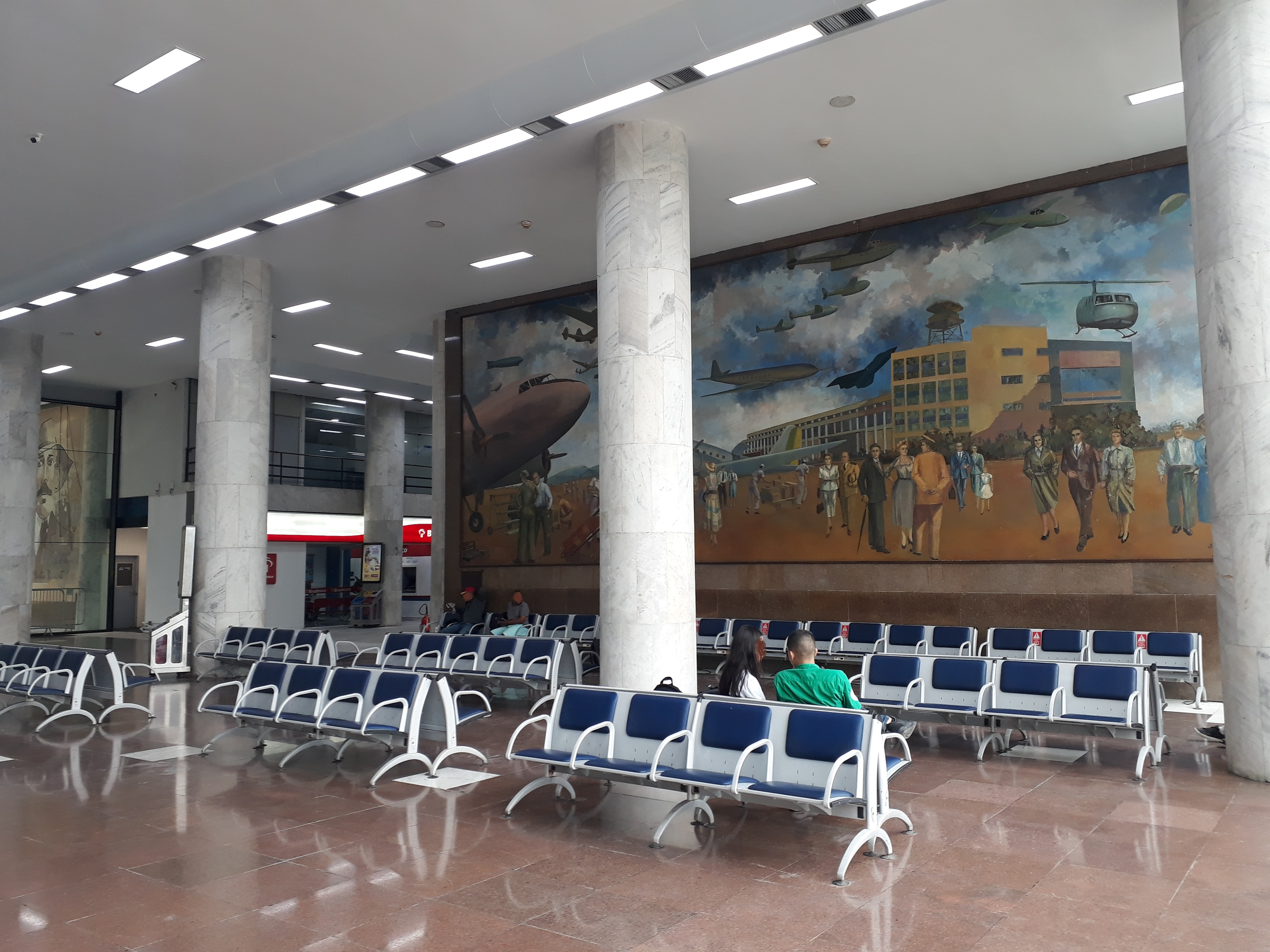
Historic waiting area in 2020

Originally known as Calabouço Airport, the history of the airport can be traced back to the early 1930s. Until that time, the few aircraft equipped with landing gear used the Manguinhos Airport. Seaplanes, which at the time operated the majority of domestic and international flights, used a terminal located at the Calabouço Point, an area known today as the Praça Marechal Âncora. Take-off and landings were made using an area of the Guanabara Bay then known as estirão do Caju (Caju water stretch). It was as a development of the terminal at the Calabouço Point that the Calabouço Airport was created.

In 1934, land was reclaimed from the sea to create the first runway of the airport with a length of 1,300 feet (400 m). In 1936, the runway was extended to 2,300 feet (700 m) and on 30 November, the airport was officially opened, being named Santos Dumont Airport. The first commercial flight arrived on the same day, a VASP Junkers Ju 52 aircraft flying from São Paulo–Congonhas.

Pan American World Airways and its Brazilian subsidiary Panair do Brasil opened their own terminal for seaplanes in 1937. It features architecture inspired by the Panamerican Seaplane Base and Terminal Building in Miami. It remained the headquarters of Panair do Brasil until the airline was forced to cease its operations in 1965. It is now the headquarters of the Third Regional Air Command of the Brazilian Air Force.

In 1938 the construction of a new passenger terminal began. It was a project led by the architects MMM Roberto (Marcelo, Milton and Mauricio Roberto Doria-Baptista) inspired in the Paris–Le Bourget Airport terminal. Its pioneering, modernist, architectural features caused it to become a Brazilian national landmark in 1998. It was only in 1945 that the terminal's construction was completed, which was interrupted by World War II. This building continues to be used to the present day, but only for arrivals.

Also in 1938, the runway was extended from 700 to 1050 meters to satisfy the demand for land aircraft.

In 1947, the runway was extended to 1,350 meters.

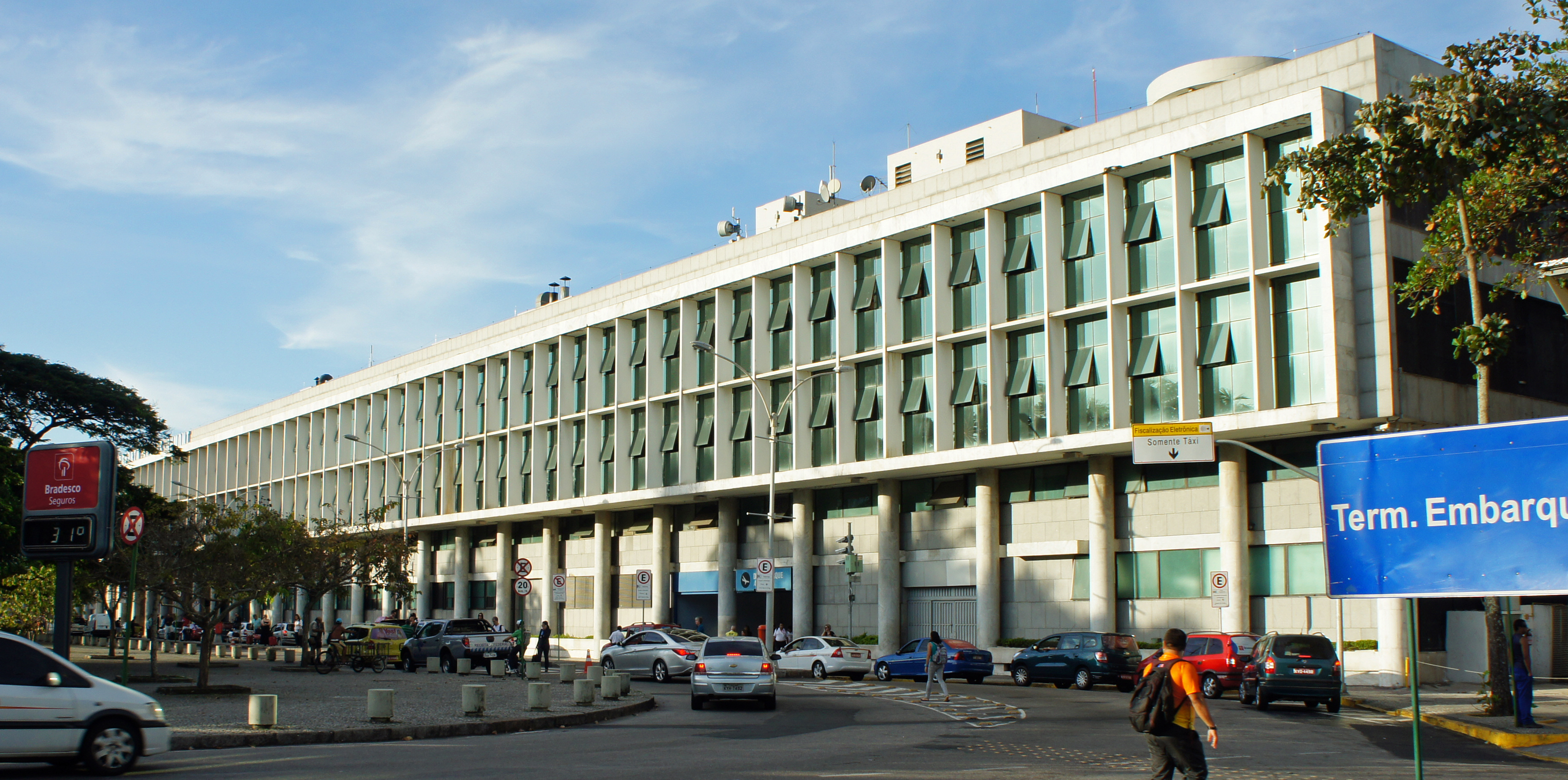
The original terminal building, which now handles only arrivals.

On 21 July 1953, within a law prescribing rules for the naming of airports, the name of the facility was officially and exceptionally maintained as Santos Dumont Airport.

On 21 May 1959 a formal agreement between Varig, Cruzeiro do Sul, and VASP created an air shuttle service (Portuguese: Ponte Aérea), the first of its kind in the world. This service operated between the Santos Dumont Airport and the São Paulo–Congonhas and comprised regular hourly departures, common check-in counter, and simplified tickets. The service was an instant success. Transbrasil joined the partnership in 1968. Starting in 1975 the service was operated exclusively by Varig's Lockheed L-188 Electra propjets. In 1999 this service came to an end because airlines decided to operate their own independent services.

With the gradual shift of international operations to the Galeão Airport, opened in 1952, the Santos Dumont airport lost its place as an international hub, and then lost its place as the most important domestic hub in 1960, when the capital of Brazil was moved to Brasília. The airport handles only part of Rio's short-to-medium haul domestic air traffic, and part of its general aviation and military operations. The airport is famous for having some of the shortest runways on which some Boeing and Airbus aircraft can land. An idea of these operations is given in the 007–James Bond film Moonraker of 1979, in which a Lockheed L-188 Electra briefly appears taking-off from the airport.

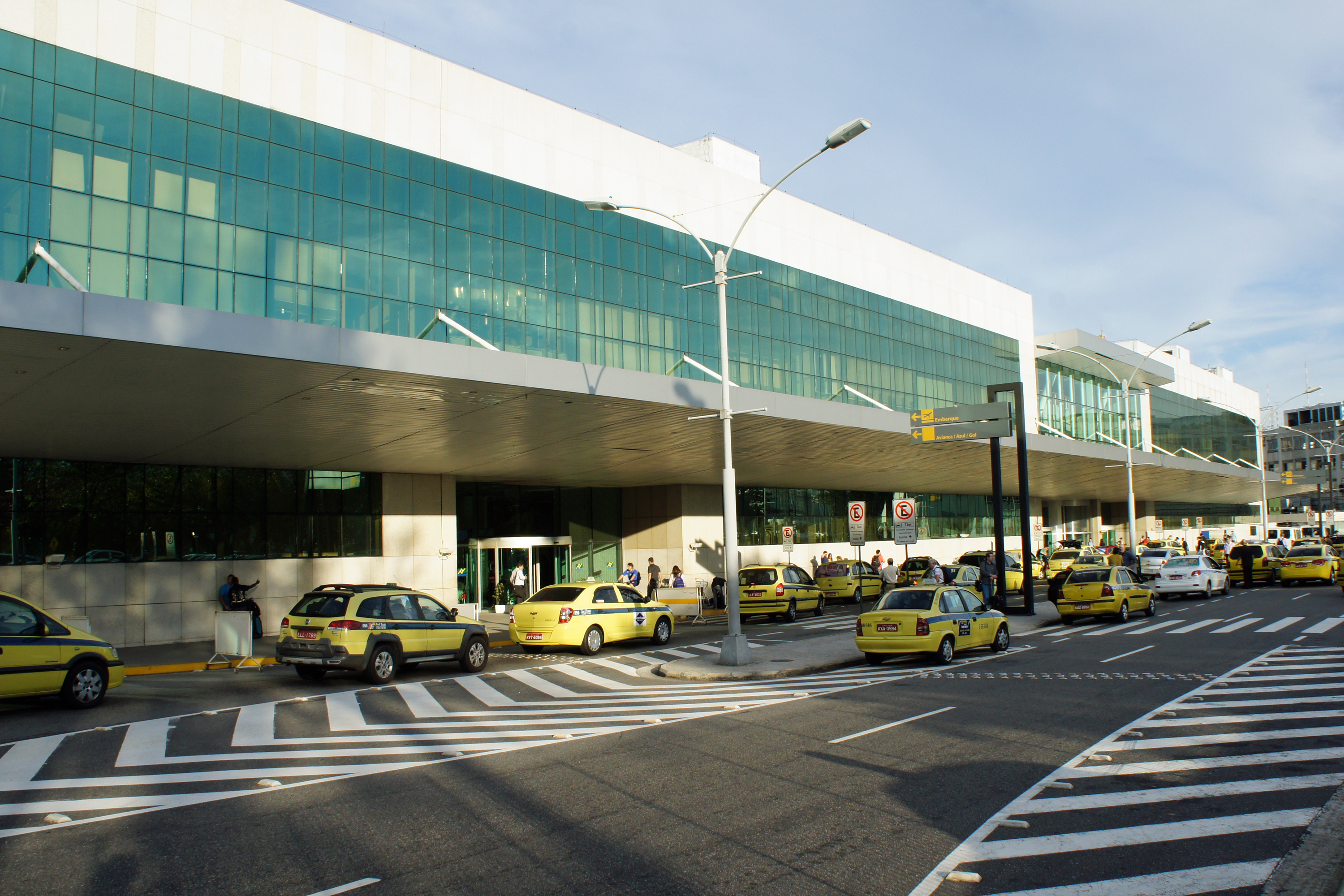
The new terminal building opened in 2007 and handles all departures.

The airport was heavily damaged in a fire on 13 February 1998, which kept the airport closed until 15 August 1998.

In March 2005, an ordinance restricted the airport's operations to domestic flights, general aviation, and air taxi. Among others, the main limitation centers on turboprop aircraft, with a maximum capacity of 50 seats on regular flights, with the exception of flights to Sao Paulo which operate without restriction.

On 26 May 2007, in time for the 2007 Pan American Games, a brand-new, modern extension of the original terminal was opened. This extension handles all departure operations, whilst the original terminal now handles all arrival operations. The new departures terminal increased the total capacity of the airport to 8.5 million passengers/year and added 8 passenger gates. It also introduced a one-of-a-kind climate control system, with the air conditioning installed in the floor to prevent obstruction of the view. The total area was increased from 19,000 m² to 61,000 m².

On 3 September 2009, the operational standards were adjusted; the airport would close between 23:00 and 06:00 hours, and the maximum number of flights per hour was reduced from 23 to 19, being one of the five airports with such restrictions in Brazil.

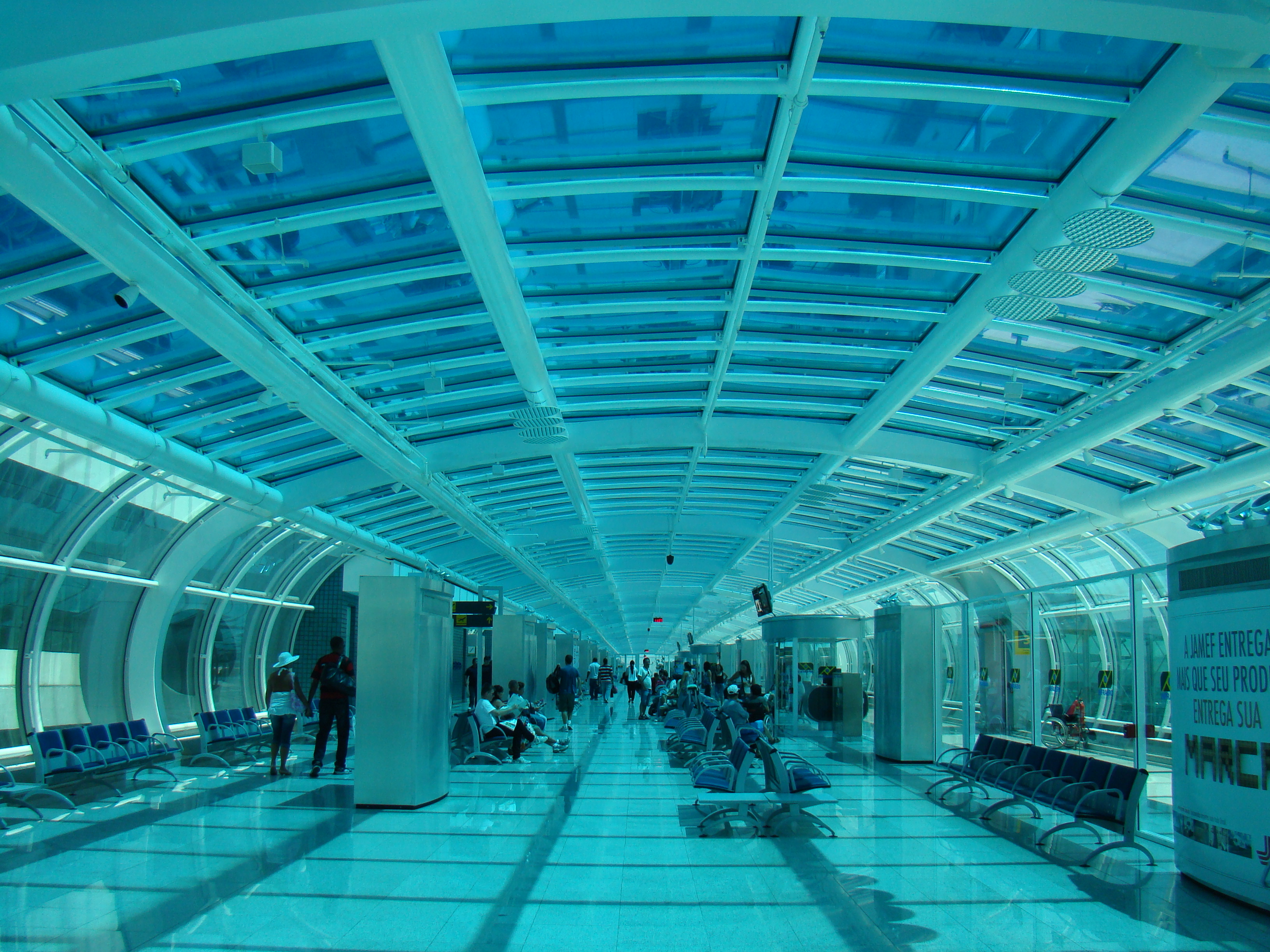
Boarding area in 2019

On 31 August 2009, Infraero unveiled a BRL152.2 million (US$80.2 million; EUR64.5 million) investment plan to upgrade Santos Dumont Airport, particularly the passenger arrivals terminal. The plan focused on the preparations for the 2014 FIFA World Cup, which was held in Brazil and Rio de Janeiro being one of the venue cities, and the 2016 Summer Olympics. The renovation was completed in 2013.

Whilst this airport is quite conveniently located very close to the city centre, the location is problematic because aircraft have Sugarloaf Mountain on the direct approach path; this means that aircraft have to negotiate the mountainous terrain beyond the two runways by either:
a. flying over the bay entrance, then quickly swerving behind Sugarloaf on to the runway glide path, or
b. fly over central Rio and negotiate the mountainous terrain not just around Sugarloaf, but also around the central west of Rio.

A highlight of the Santos Dumont Airport is the modern departure lounge, the first in the country to be completely covered with transparent material, which provides a wide view of the Guanabara Bay, where it is possible to see tourist attractions such as the Rio-Niterói Bridge, the Fiscal Island, the Museum of Contemporary Art, the city of Niterói, the Naval School and the Sugarloaf Mountain.

The Santos Dumont Airport was the secondary airport of Rio de Janeiro, the much larger Galeão–Antonio Carlos Jobim International Airport being the primary facility until 2019. In 2020 positions inverted and in 2022 the Santos Dumont was accounting for approximately 63% of the total traffic of Greater Rio de Janeiro, spread into three airports. In 2022 Santos Dumont reached 10,178,502 transported passengers whereas Galeão had only 5,895,257. In order to control and revert this abnormal trend, on August 10, 2023 the Civil Aviation National Council issued an order to restrict Santos Dumont services to airports located within 400km maximum from Rio de Janeiro and without international services. The resolution came into force on 1 January 2024 and was considered to be provisory, until a balance was reached. Airlines started cancelling and/or moving services to the Galeão in September 2023. Using the opportunity of reduced traffic, the same resolution authorized the upgrade works of Runway End Safety Areas applying engineered materials arrestor system. Following resistance from the international aviation community, on 8 November 2023 these restrictions were reversed and replaced by an annual cap of 6,5 million passengers starting in 2024.

== Airlines and destinations ==
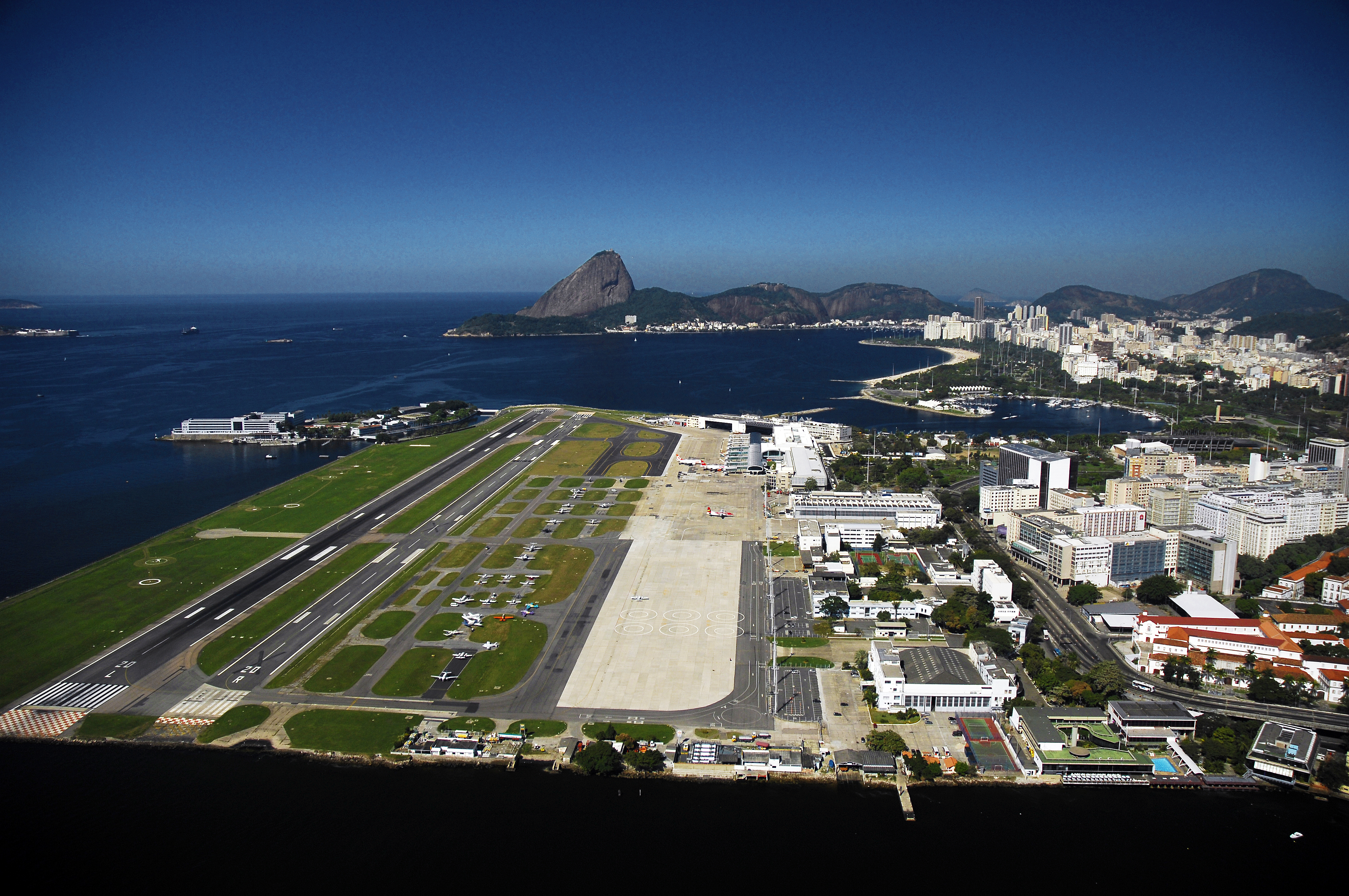
Aerial view of the airport

Airlines	Destinations
Azul Brazilian Airlines	Belo Horizonte–Confins, Campinas, São Paulo–Congonhas, São Paulo–Guarulhos
Gol Linhas Aéreas	Brasília, São Paulo–Congonhas
LATAM Brasil	Brasília, São Paulo–Congonhas, São Paulo–Guarulhos; Seasonal: Porto Seguro, Salvador da Bahia

== Statistics ==
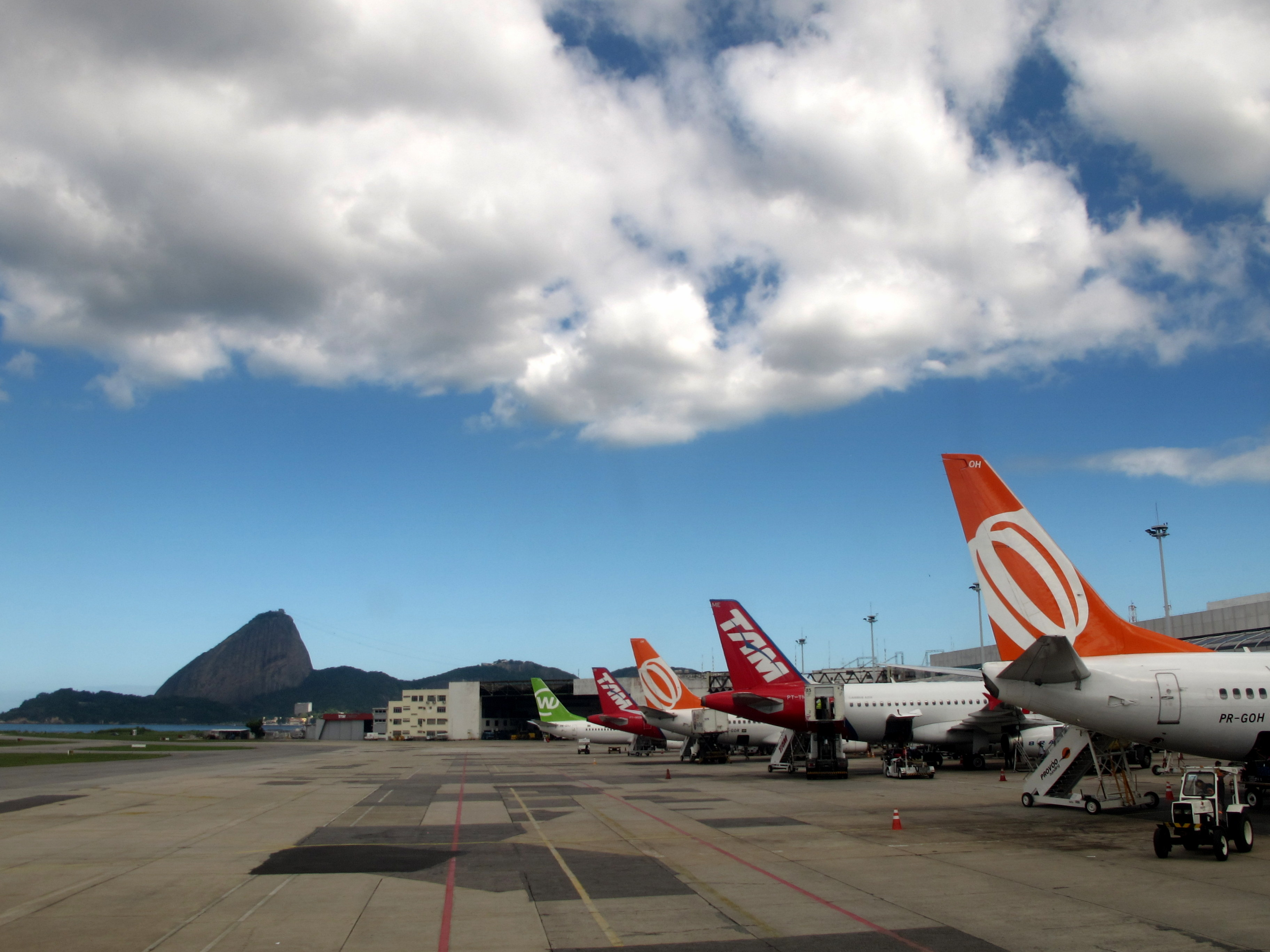
Planes with Sugarloaf Mountain in the background

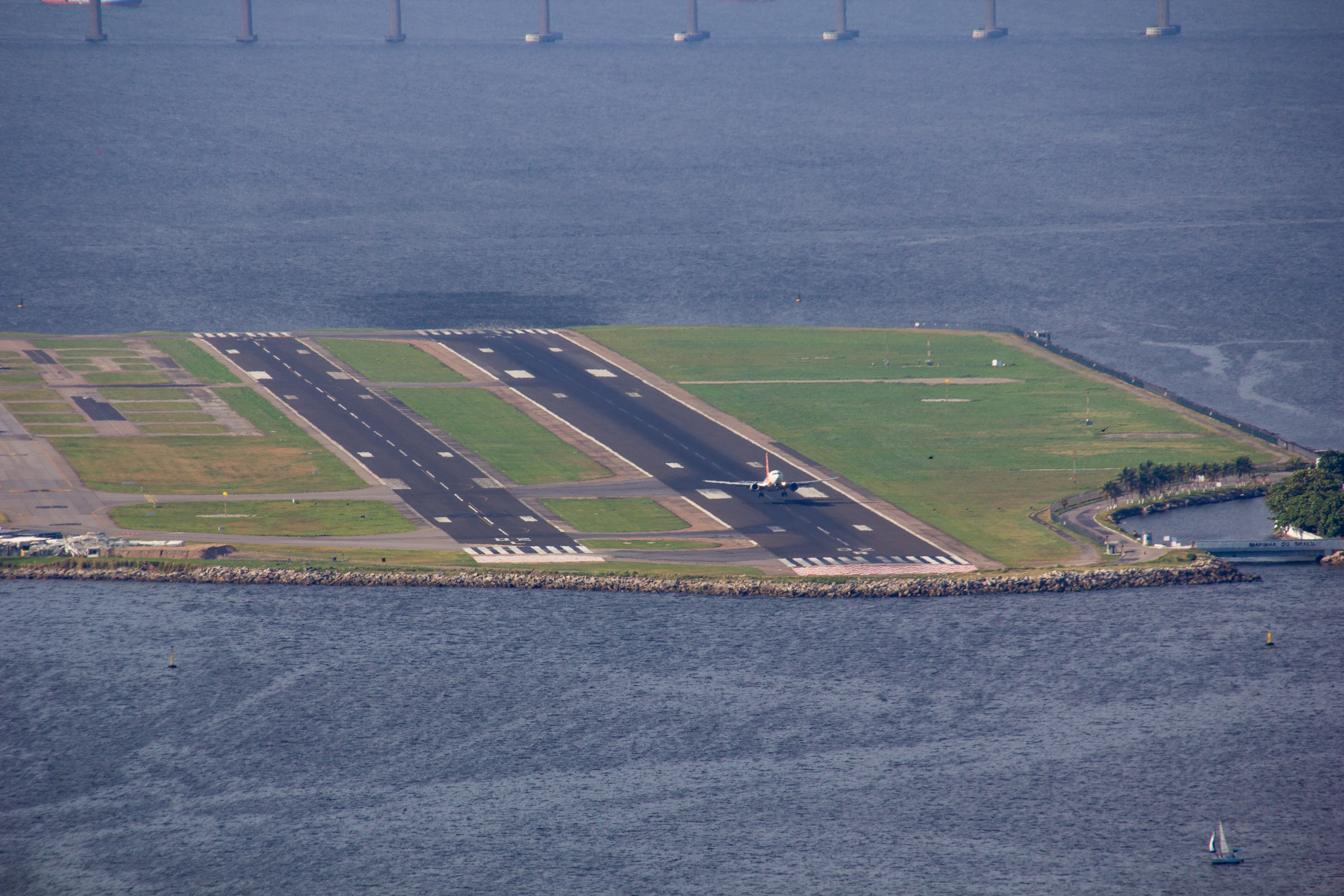
View of both runways

Following are the number of passenger, aircraft and cargo movements at the airport, according to Infraero reports:

Year	Passenger	Aircraft	Cargo (t)
2025	6,201,200 ▲1%	72,223 ▲1%	6,288 ▲34%
2024	6,145,799 ▼46%	71,386 ▼41%	4,698 ▼63%
2023	11,446,012 ▲12%	120,888 ▲11%	12,656 ▲26%
2022	10,178,502 ▲50%	109,352 ▲51%	10,005 ▲46%
2021	6,799,614 ▲37%	72,370 ▲34%	6,854 ▲31%
2020	4,978,152 ▼45%	54,080 ▼43%	5,215 ▼25%
2019	9,091,258 ▼1%	95,203 ▼5%	6,982 ▲5%
2018	9,206,059	100,144 ▼2%	6,679 ▲91%
2017	9,247,185 ▲2%	102,067 ▼3%	3,490 ▲40%
2016	9,065,905 ▼6%	105,671 ▼12%	2,499 ▼14%
2015	9,618,197 ▼3%	120,538 ▼4%	2,892 ▼43%
2014	9,924,977 ▲8%	125,798 ▼1%	5,089 ▼42%
2013	9,204,603 ▲2%	127,328 ▼6%	8,828 ▲50%
2012	9,002,863 ▲6%	135,373 ▲4%	5,875 ▲39%
2011	8,515,021 ▲9%	129,629 ▲2%	4,236 ▲25%
2010	7,822,848 ▲53%	126,515 ▲30%	3,367 ▼6%
2009	5,009,643 ▲41%	97,075 ▲36%	3,564 ▲42%
2008	3,628,766 ▲13%	71,527 ▲9%	2,509 ▼8%
2007	3,214,415	65,689	2,733

== Accidents and incidents ==
=== Major accidents involving fatalities ===
- 3 December 1930: a Syndicato Condor seaplane Dornier Wal crashed in the Guanabara Bay while attempting to avoid a collision against another aircraft. Six passengers and four crew members died.
- 3 May 1934: a Syndicato Condor Junkers W-34 crashed during landing procedures at the Rio de Janeiro–Santos Dumont. Two crew members died.
- 15 August 1938: a Syndicato Condor seaplane Junkers Ju 52 suffered an accident while departing from the Guanabara Bay. All passengers and crew died, except for one crew member.
- 8 November 1940: a VASP Junkers Ju 52 taking-off from the Santos Dumont airport to São Paulo–Congonhas collided in mid-air with the de Havilland Dragonfly belonging to Shell-Mex, which was preparing for a water-landing in front of the Fluminense Yacht Club in Botafogo. Fatalities included all 14 passengers and 4 crew on the VASP aircraft and the pilot of the Shell-Mex aircraft.
- 27 August 1943: a VASP Junkers Ju 52 flying from São Paulo–Congonhas to the Santos Dumont Airport struck Naval Academy building adjacent to the airport shortly after attempting to land under foggy conditions. The aircraft broke in two and one part fell in the water. Of the 21 passengers and crew, three survived.
- 12 September 1954: a Cruzeiro do Sul Douglas C-47 flying from the Rio de Janeiro–Santos Dumont to the São Paulo–Congonhas was forced to return to Rio de Janeiro due to technical problems and bad weather at São Paulo. On finals to Rio de Janeiro the aircraft came in too high. A go around was attempted but the aircraft descended and crashed into the Guanabara Bay. Six passengers out of 30 occupants died.
- 1 February 1958: a Lóide Aéreo Nacional Douglas DC-4 flying to Fortaleza, experienced engine failure during takeoff. Takeoff was aborted and 100m before the end of the runway, a tire from the landing gear burst, causing the aircraft to run off the side of the runway and burst into flames. Of the 72 passengers and crew aboard, 5 died.
- 31 May 1958: a cargo Paraense Curtiss C-46 Commando crashed shortly after take-off due to unknown causes. The crew of 4 died.
- 30 December 1958: a VASP Saab 90 Scandia flying from the Rio de Janeiro–Santos Dumont to the São Paulo–Congonhas experienced a failure of engine no.1 during the climb after takeoff. The pilot initiated an emergency return to the airport, but during its second turn the aircraft stalled and crashed into the Guanabara Bay. Of the 34 passengers and crew aboard, 20 died.
- 25 February 1960 (1960 Rio de Janeiro mid-air collision): a Real Transportes Aéreos Douglas DC-3 flying from the Bartolomeu Lysandro Airport to the Santos Dumont airport collided in the air over the Guanabara Bay close to the Sugarloaf Mountain with a United States Navy Douglas R6D-1 (DC-6A) flying from Buenos Aires–Ezeiza to the Rio de Janeiro–Galeão Air Force Base. The probable causes of the accident are disputed, but include pilot error and errors from the ATC. All 26 passengers and crew of the DC-3 died. Of the 38 occupants in the DC-6A, only three survived.
- 24 June 1960: a Real Transportes Aéreos Convair CV-340 flying from Belo Horizonte-Pampulha to Santos Dumont Airport crashed into Guanabara Bay in the vicinity of the Galeão Airport due to unknown causes. All 54 passengers and crew died.
- 12 April 1972: a VASP NAMC YS-11A flying from São Paulo–Congonhas to the Santos Dumont Airport flew into the side of a mountain while on descent 50 km north of Rio de Janeiro due to pilot error. All 25 passengers and crew died.
- 23 October 1973: a VASP NAMC YS-11 flying from Santos Dumont Airport to Belo Horizonte-Pampulha aborted its takeoff, overran the runway, and slid into the Guanabara Bay. Of the 65 passengers and crew, 8 passengers died.

=== Incidents ===
- 2 December 1959: a Panair do Brasil Lockheed L-049/149 Constellation registration PP-PCR operating as Flight 246 en route from the Rio de Janeiro–Santos Dumont to the Belém-Val de Cans with 44 passengers and crew aboard was seized and hijacked by officers of the Brazilian Air Force and forced to land at Aragarças, Goiás. Their intention was to use the aircraft in a bombing of Government buildings in Rio de Janeiro, and by thus starting a revolt against President Juscelino Kubitschek de Oliveira. The revolt faded after 36 hours, and the aircraft was commanded to fly to Buenos Aires where the hijackers requested asylum. There were no casualties.
- 31 October 1966: a VASP Vickers Viscount was damaged beyond repair when it overran the runway.
- 8 December 1967: a Brazilian Air Force Vickers Viscount registration FAB2100 was written off when its undercarriage malfunctioned.
- 12 August 2010: a Bombardier Learjet 55 suffered an electrical failure in route to the Santos Dumont airport, and after landing, had trouble braking, and overshot the runway into the bay. None of the three occupants had major injuries.

== Access ==
The Rio de Janeiro Light Rail has a terminal station at the airport connecting the airport with downtown area, the subway system, the Central Railway Station, and the Central Bus Station.

== See also ==
- List of airports in Brazil
