= Santa Cruz Air Force Base =

Military airport serving Rio de Janeiro, Brazil

- Base Aérea de Santa Cruz
- Rio de Janeiro, Rio de Janeiro in Brazil
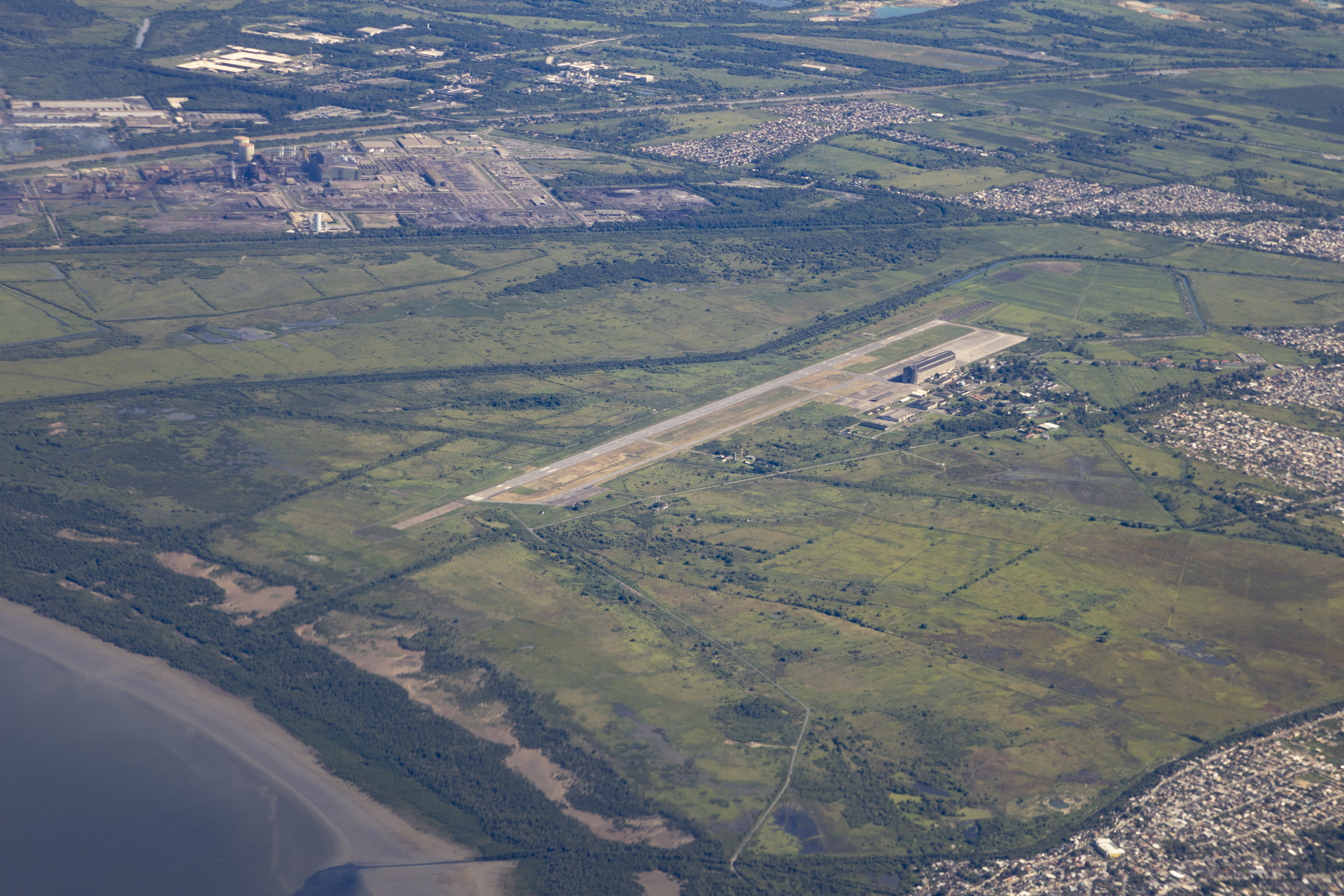
- Santa Cruz Air Force Base (2022)

Site information
- Type: Air Force Base
- Code: ALA12
- Owner: Brazilian Air Force
- Controlled by: Brazilian Air Force
- Open to the public: No
- Website: www.fab.mil.br/organizacoes/mostra/513

Location
- Location in Brazil SBSC (Rio de Janeiro (state)) SBSC (Brazil)
- Coordinates: 22°55′58″S 043°43′10″W

Site history
- Built: 1936
- In use: 1942-present

Garrison information
- Current commander: Cel. Av. Alessandro Barbosa Arrais de Oliveira
- Occupants: 1st Squadron of the 7th Aviation Group; 3rd Squadron of the 8th Aviation Group; 1st and 2nd Squadrons of the 1st Group of Combat Aviation; 1st Squadron of the 1st Communications and Control Group

Airfield information
- Identifiers: IATA: SNZ, ICAO: SBSC, LID: RJ9003
- Elevation: 3 metres (10 ft) AMSL
Runways
Direction	Length and surface
05/23	2,739 metres (8,986 ft) Asphalt

Santa Cruz Air Force Base – ALA12 (IATA: SNZ, ICAO: SBSC) is a base of the Brazilian Air Force, located in the district of Santa Cruz in Rio de Janeiro, Brazil.

== History ==
The base was originally called Bartolomeu de Gusmão Airport and it was constructed to handle the operations with the rigid airships Graf Zeppelin and Hindenburg. Between 1931 and 1937, Deutsche Luft Hansa had regular flights between Germany and Brazil, with Rio de Janeiro as the final stop. For this reason, Luftschiffbau Zeppelin decided to construct a dedicated facility and move its operations from Campo dos Afonsos Airport. The airport was inaugurated on 26 December 1936. The whole complex consisted of an airfield, the hangar, a hydrogen factory and a branch line connecting the complex to the main railway line to downtown Rio de Janeiro, 54 km away, among other structures. Some of the buildings are still in use, particularly the hangar, which was built to accommodate the rigid airships. Because it is one of the few surviving hangars built for rigid airships in the world, on 14 March 1999, it was listed as a National Heritage Site.

As a consequence to the Hindenburg disaster on 6 May 1937 at Lakehurst Air Naval Station in New Jersey, US, the Luftschiffbau Zeppelin requested to the Brazilian Government on 17 June 1937 the suspension of services. Since then no more civil operations have been handled at this facility.

On 12 February 1942, six months before Brazil declared war against the Axis, the airport was commissioned as a base of the Brazilian Air Force. The name of the facility was changed to Santa Cruz Air Force Base on 16 January 1943, even though, according to a law prescribing rules for the naming of airports of July 21, 1953, the name of the facility could officially and exceptionally be maintained as Bartolomeu de Gusmão Airport.

== Units ==
The following units are based at Santa Cruz Air Force Base:

- 1st Squadron of the 7th Aviation Group (1°/7°GAv) Orungan, using the P-3AM Orion, and the Elbit RQ-1150 Heron.
- 3rd Squadron of the 8th Aviation Group (3°/8°GAv) Puma, using the H-36 Caracal.
- 1st Fighter Aviation Group (1ºGAvC), comprising the (1°/1°GAvC) Jambock Squadron and the (2°/1°GAvC) Pif-paf Squadron, using the F-5EM & FM.
- 1st Squadron of the 1st Communications and Control Group (1º/1ºGCC) Profeta, using radars and equipment for air defense.

== Accidents and incidents ==
- 7 August 1951: The Brazilian Air Force, a Douglas C-47 Skytrain registration FAB-2028, struck a hillside reportedly following an engine failure and crashed upon approach to Santa Cruz. The crew of 4 died.
- 3 May 1982: a Royal Air Force Avro Vulcan was intercepted by two F-5E aircraft of the 2nd Squadron of the 1st Group of Combat Aviation (2°/1°GAvC) Pif-paf based at Santa Cruz. The Vulcan had finished the Operation Black Buck 6 during the Falklands War and was returning to Ascension Island when it suffered technical problems. It was intercepted upon entering Brazilian airspace and made to land at the Galeão Air Force Base. The Brazilian aircraft flew back to Santa Cruz having successfully accomplished the first real interception mission in their history.

== Access ==
The base is located 54 km from Rio de Janeiro downtown in the district of Santa Cruz.

== Gallery ==
This gallery displays aircraft that are or have been based at Santa Cruz. The gallery is not comprehensive.

=== Present aircraft ===
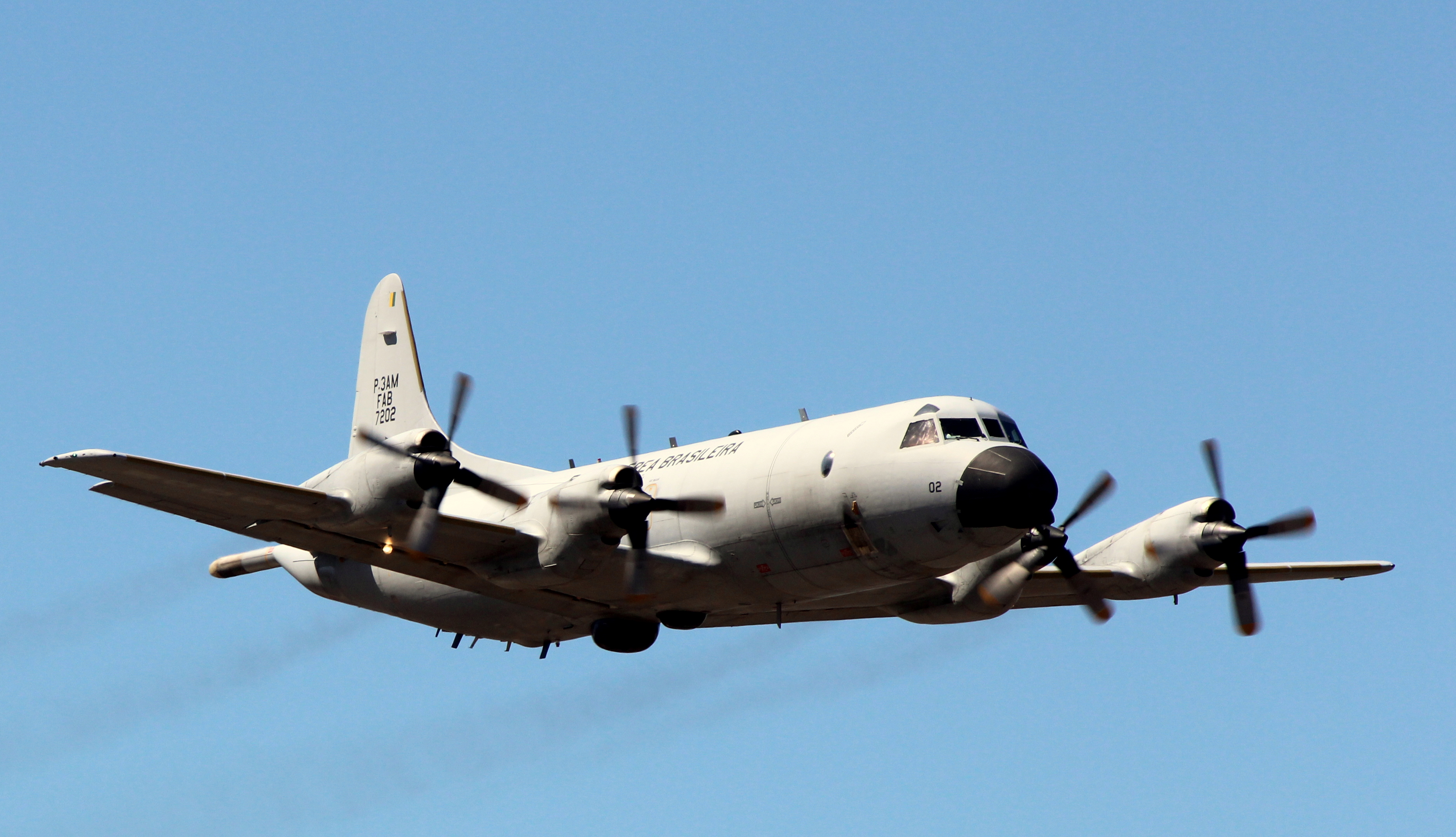
Lockheed P-3AM Orion (FAB)

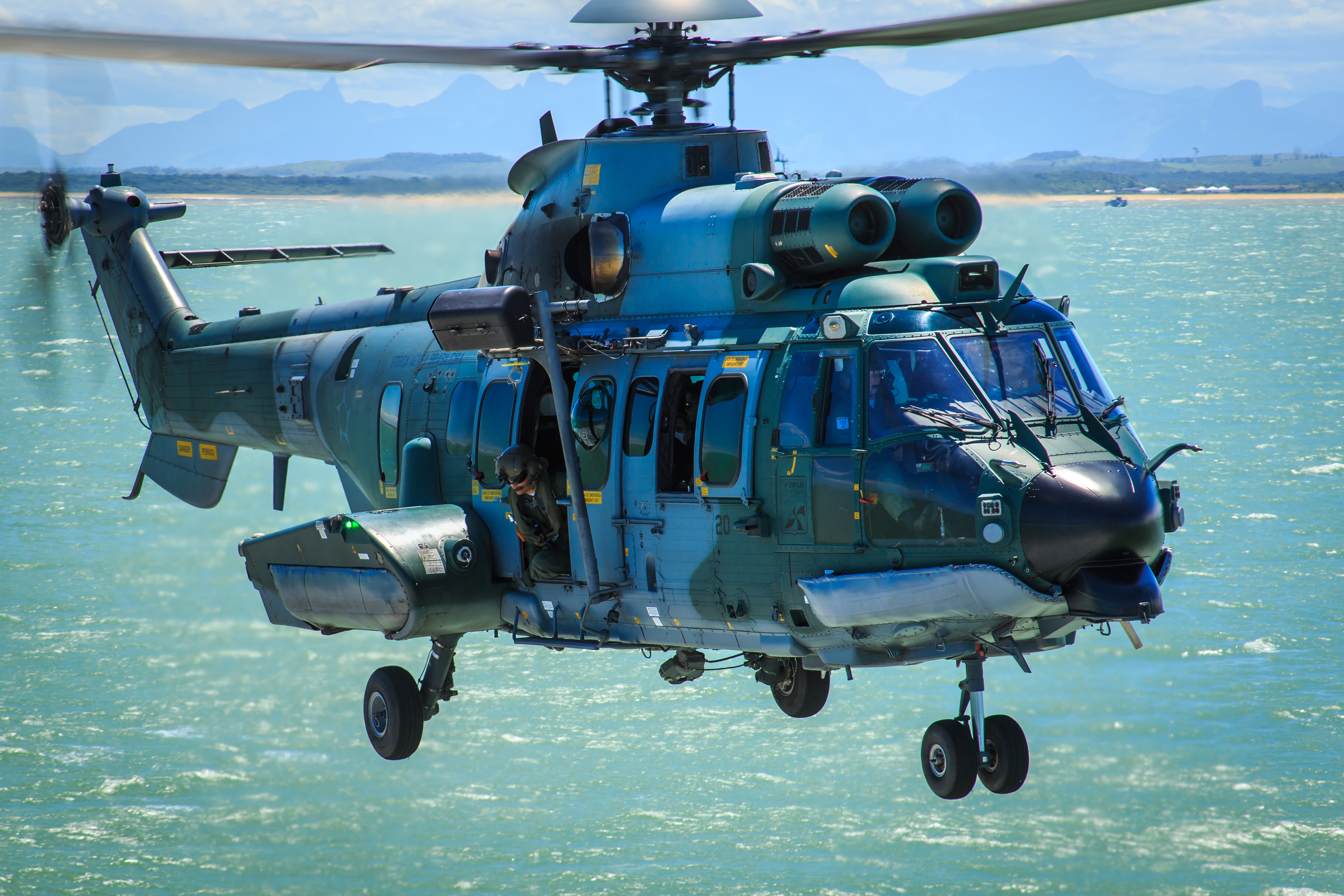
Eurocopter H-36 Caracal (FAB)

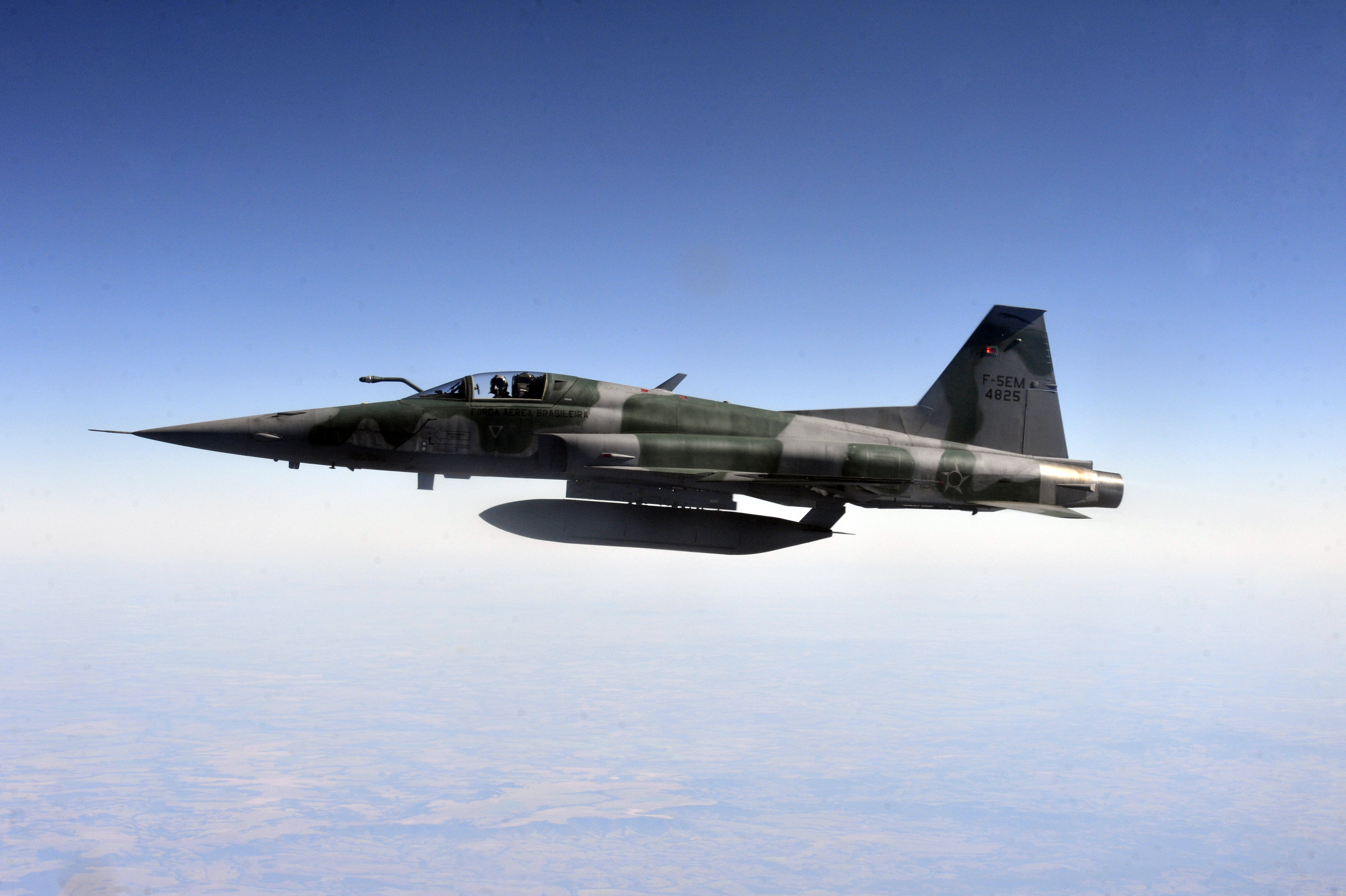
Northrop F-5EM (FAB)

=== Retired aircraft ===
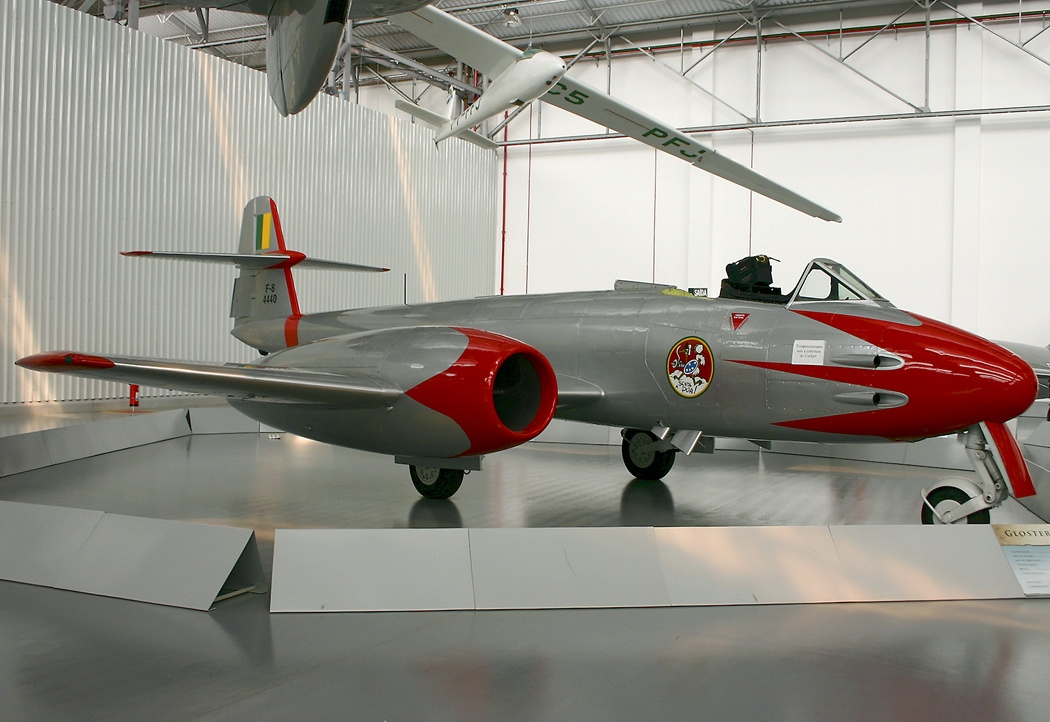
Gloster F-8 Meteor

Lockheed TF-33A T-Bird

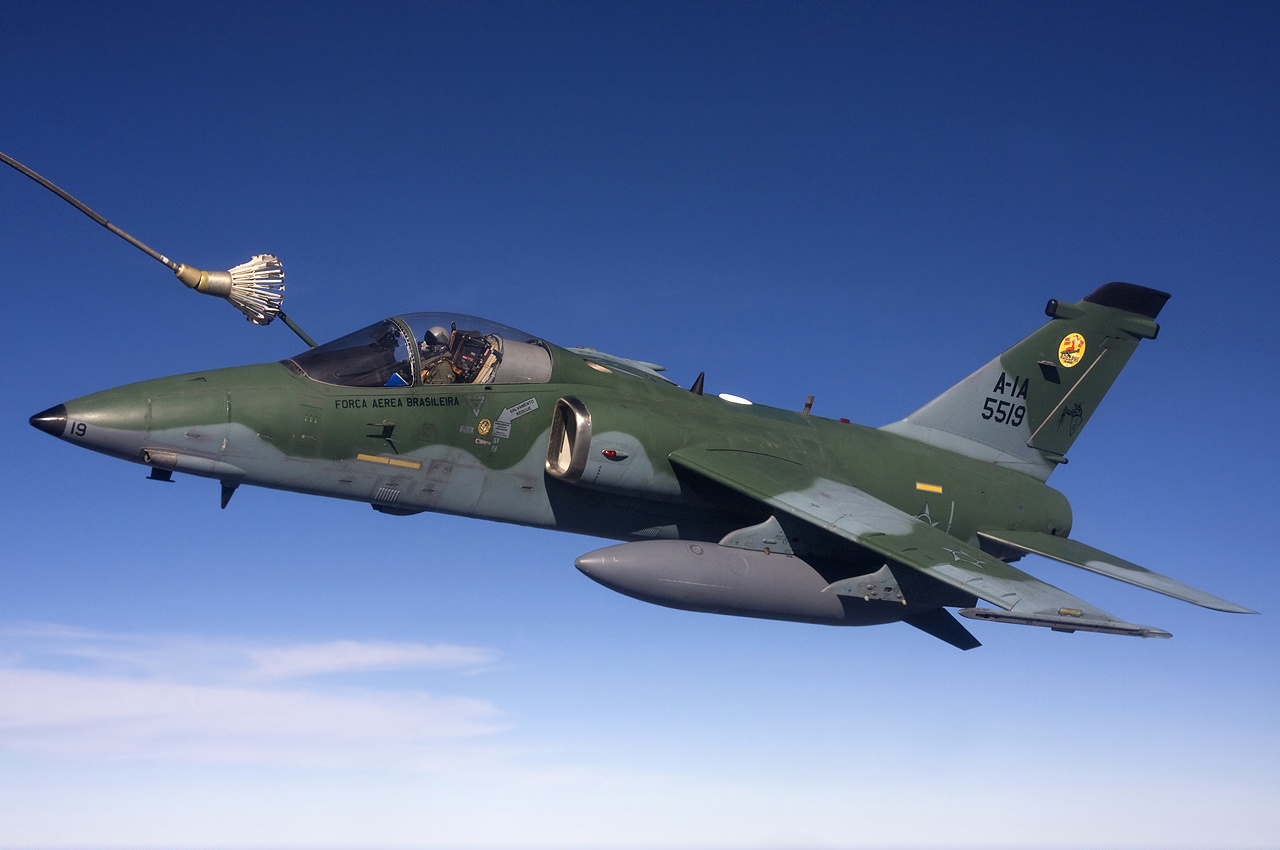
A-1 AMX

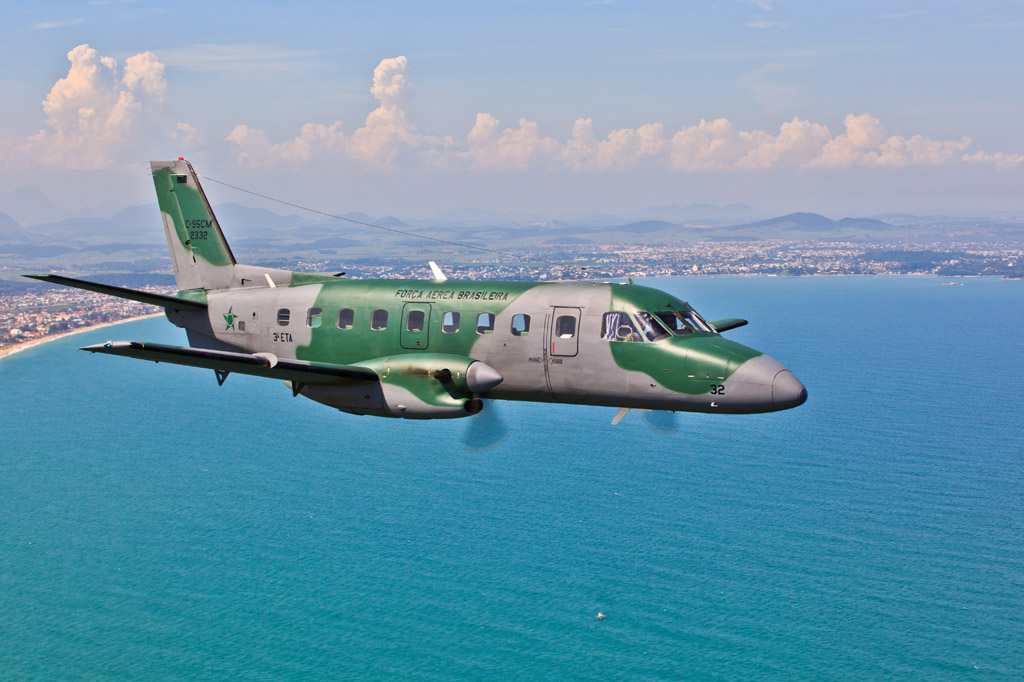
Embraer C-95B Bandeirante (FAB)

== See also ==
- List of Brazilian military bases
- Bartolomeu de Gusmão Airport
