= Galeão Air Force Base =

Air base of the Brazilian Air Force

- Base Aérea do Galeão
- Rio de Janeiro, Rio de Janeiro in Brazil
- Delivery of a F-5B at Galeão in 1975

Site information
- Type: Air Force Base
- Code: ALA11
- Owner: Brazilian Air Force
- Controlled by: Brazilian Air Force
- Open to the public: No
- Website: www.fab.mil.br/organizacoes/mostra/42

Location
- Location in Brazil SBGL (Rio de Janeiro (state)) SBGL (Brazil)
- Coordinates: 22°48′36″S 043°15′02″W

Site history
- Built: 1923
- In use: 1941-present

Garrison information
- Current commander: Cel. Av. Renato Alves de Oliveira
- Occupants: 1st Squadron of the 1st Transportation Group; 1st Squadron of the 2nd Transportation Group; 2nd Squadron of the 2nd Transportation Group; 3rd Squadron of Air Transportation

Airfield information
- Identifiers: IATA: GIG, ICAO: SBGL, LID: RJ0001
- Elevation: 9 metres (30 ft) AMSL
Runways
Direction	Length and surface
10/28	4,000 metres (13,123 ft) Concrete
15/33	3,180 metres (10,433 ft) Asphalt

Galeão Air Force Base – ALA11 (IATA: GIG, ICAO: SBGL) is a base of the Brazilian Air Force located in Rio de Janeiro, Brazil. It is named after nearby Praia do Galeão (Galleon Beach), where in 1663 the galleon Padre Eterno was built.

It shares some facilities with Rio de Janeiro/Galeão International Airport.

== History ==
The history of the Base begins on 10 May 1923 when a School of Naval Aviation was established near Galeão beach. On 22 May 1941 with the creation of the Air Force Ministry in Brazil, the school became the Galeão Air Force Base and a terminal and hangars were built at the location and the runway extended. Those buildings still exist. When Brazil declared war against the Axis on 22 August 1942, the aerodrome began to be intensively used by the Allies for military operations related to the World War II.

With the end of the war, the increase of tonnage of aircraft flying on international routes and number of passengers, and being Santos Dumont Airport unable to handle all the traffic international flights gradually shifted to the site of the Air Force Base. Although it informally handled long-haul international traffic, services were however precarious and a decision was made to build a brand new passenger terminal, opposite the Air Force Base, across the runway. On 1 February 1952 the passenger terminal was opened and public and military services were separated.

After the completion of a new passenger terminal in 1977, the original public facility became the passenger terminal for passenger flights operated by the Brazilian Air Force. Since then it is informally known as Terminal do Correio Aéreo Nacional (Brazilian Air Force Passenger Services Terminal).

== Units ==
The following units are based at Galeão Air Force Base:

Aircraft	Model	Air unit
	Embraer KC-390	1st Squadron of the 1st Transportation Group (1°/1°GT) Gordo
	Lockheed C-130 Hercules	1st Squadron of the 1st Transportation Group (1°/1°GT) Gordo
	Embraer C-99 A	2nd Squadron of the 1st Transportation Group (1°/2°GT) Condor
	Embraer C-97 Brasília	2nd Squadron of the 1st Transportation Group (1°/2°GT) Condor
	Airbus KC-30	2nd Squadron of the 2nd Transportation Group (2°/2°GT) Corsário
	Embraer C-95 B & BM Bandeirante	3rd Squadron of Air Transportation (3°ETA) Pioneiro

== Retired aircraft ==
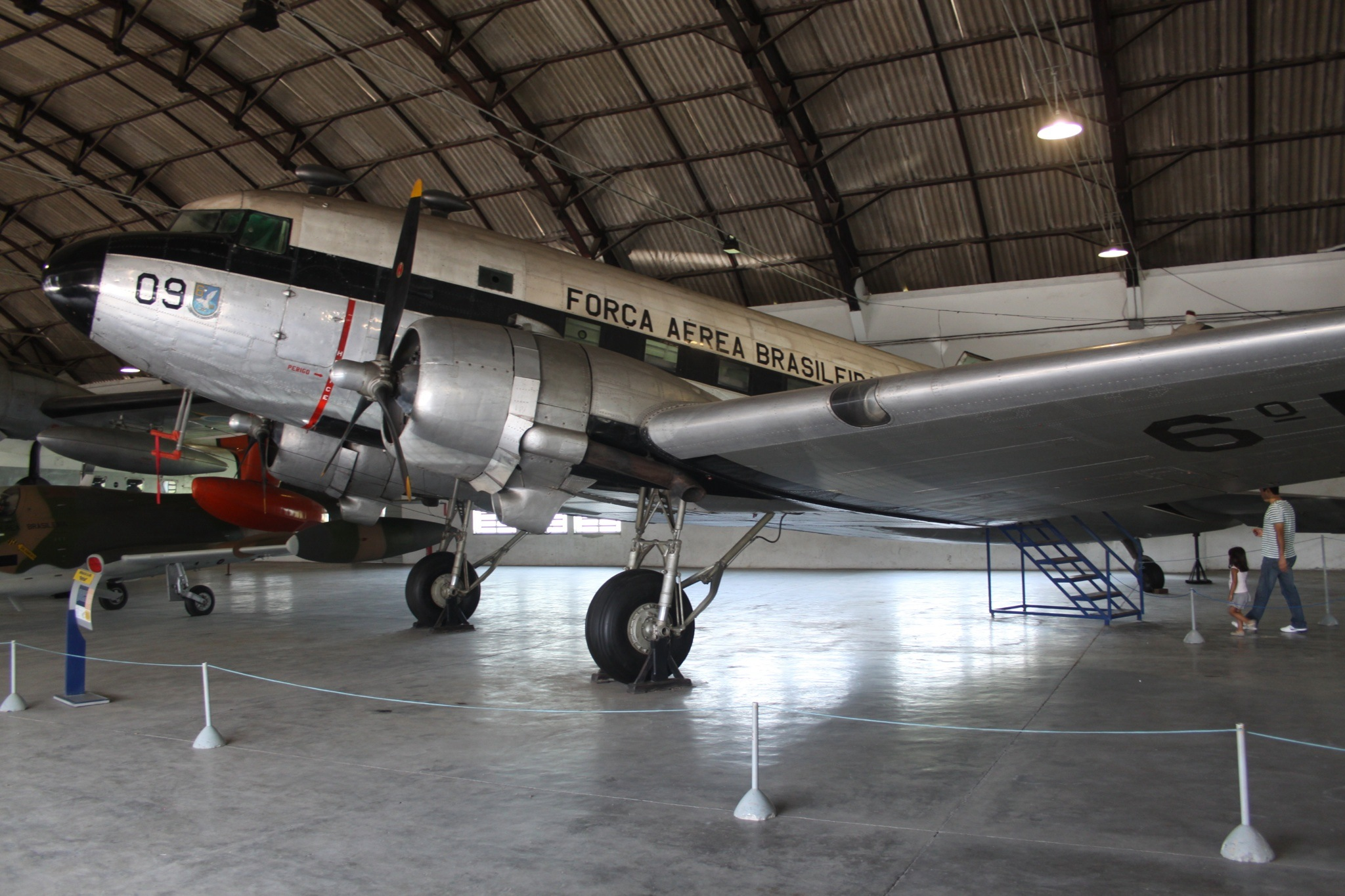
Douglas C-47 Dakota

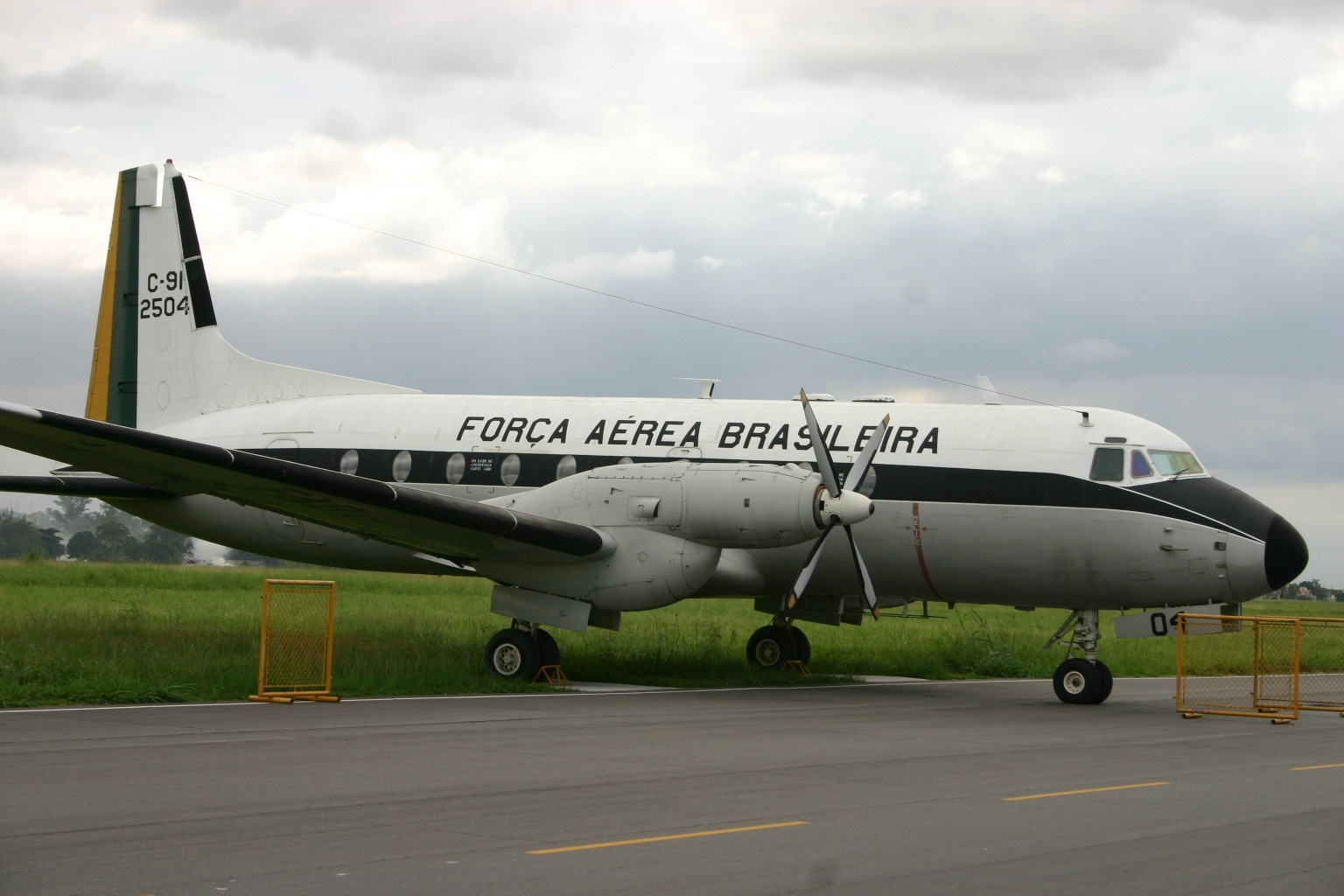
Hawker Siddeley C-91 Avro

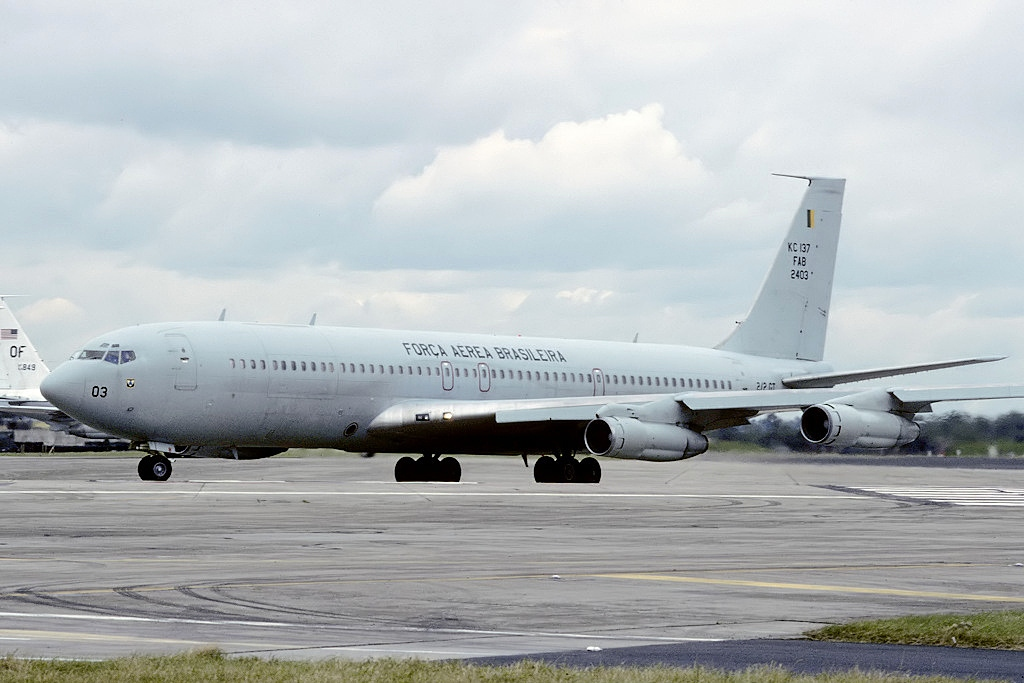
Boeing KC-137

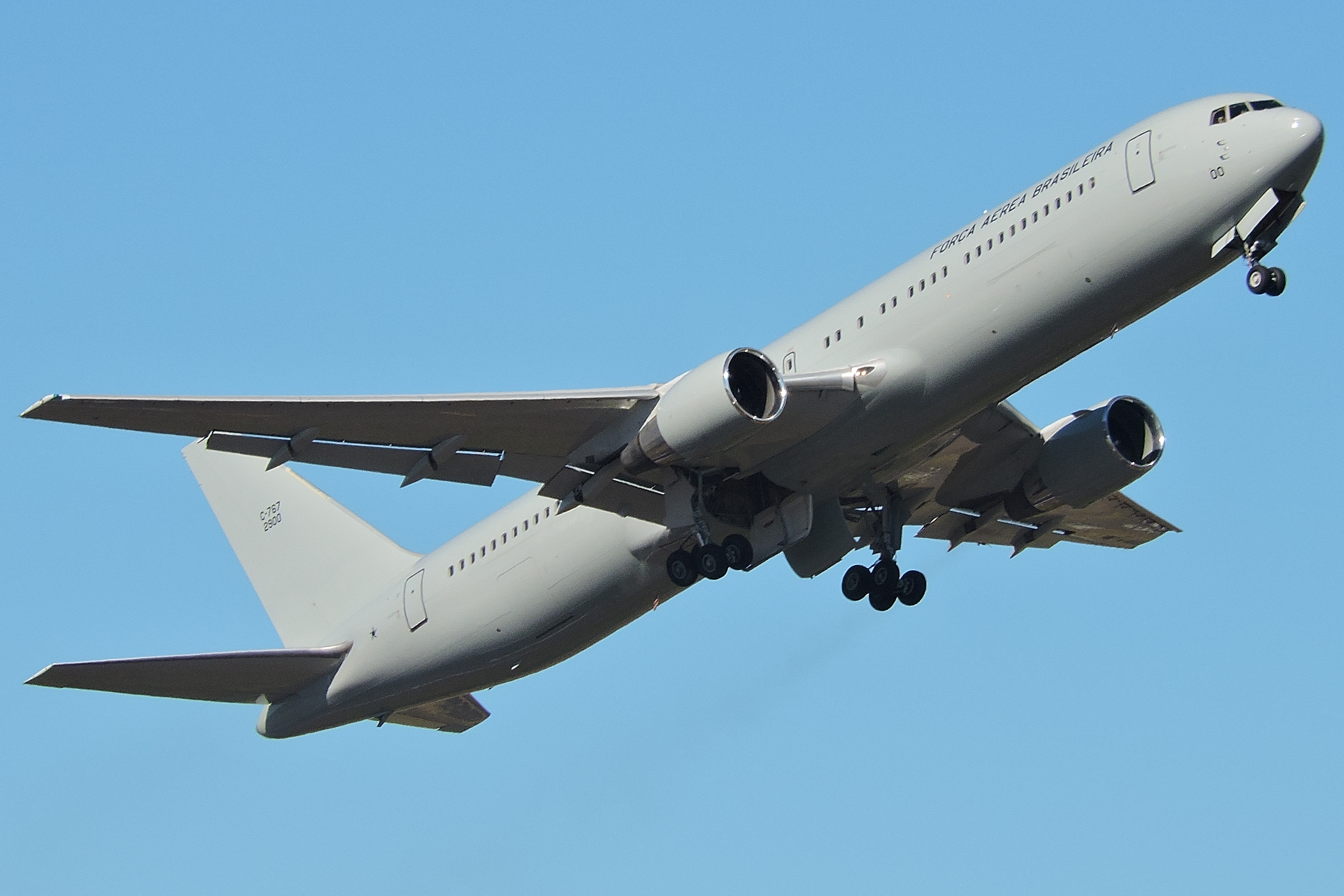
Boeing C-767

== Accidents and incidents ==
- 2 September 1953: a Brazilian Air Force Douglas C-47 registration FAB-2049 crashed in sea on training flight in the vicinity of the Base. All 4 occupants died.
- 25 February 1960: (1960 Rio de Janeiro mid-air collision) a United States Navy Douglas R6D-1 (DC-6A) registration 131582 flying from Buenos Aires-Ezeiza to Rio de Janeiro-Galeão Air Force Base collided in the air over Guanabara Bay close to Sugarloaf Mountain with a Real Transportes Aéreos Douglas DC-3 registration PP-AXD operating flight 751 from Campos dos Goytacazes to Rio de Janeiro-Santos Dumont. The probable causes of the accident are disputed but include error of personnel and faulty equipment. Of the 38 occupants of the American aircraft, 3 survived. All 26 passengers and crew of the Brazilian aircraft died.
- 3 May 1982: a Royal Air Force Avro Vulcan bomber was intercepted by two F-5E aircraft of the 2nd Squadron of the 1st Group of Combat Aviation (2°/1°GAvC) Pif-paf based at Santa Cruz Air Force Base. The Vulcan had finished the Operation Black Buck 6 during the Falklands War and was returning to Ascension Island when it suffered technical problems: while attempting to refuel from a tanker aircraft, the tip of the probe broke. With insufficient fuel to return to its base at Ascension Island, the Vulcan declared mayday, it was intercepted upon entering Brazilian airspace and made to land at Galeão Air Force Base. The Brazilian aircraft flew back to Santa Cruz Air Force Base having successfully accomplished their mission. The Vulcan and its crew were interned at Galeão Air Force Base for nine days, before they were returned on 11 June, when diplomacy of the countries involved clarified the incident.
- 12 November 1990: a Brazilian Air Force de Havilland Canada DHC-5 Buffalo registration FAB-2350 crashed upon take-off from Galeão Air Force Base. Of the 9 occupants, 1 survived.

== Access ==
The base is located 20 km from Rio de Janeiro downtown in the district of Governor Island.

== See also ==
- List of Brazilian military bases
- Rio de Janeiro/Galeão–Antonio Carlos Jobim International Airport
