= 1960 Rio de Janeiro mid-air collision =

1960 aviation accident

Accident
- Date: February 25, 1960
- Summary: Mid-air collision
- Site: Guanabara Bay, Rio de Janeiro, Brazil
- Total fatalities: 61
- Total survivors: 3

First aircraft
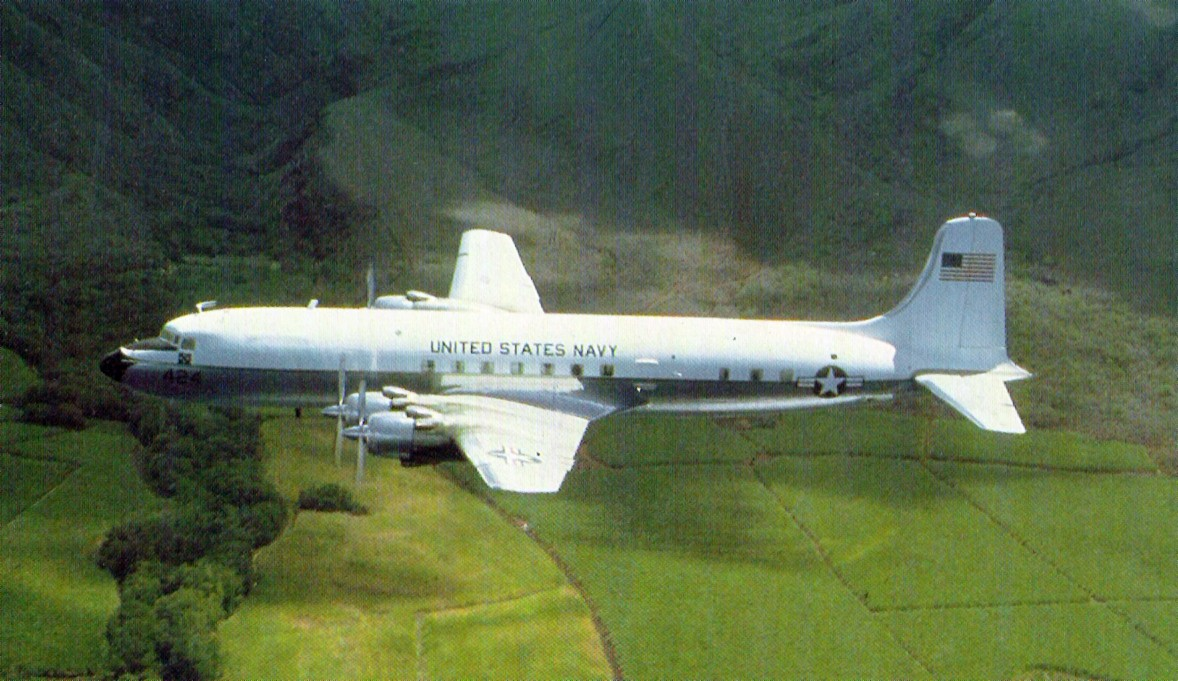
- A U.S. Navy Douglas R6D-1 similar to the accident aircraft
- Type: Douglas R6D-1 (DC-6A)
- Operator: United States Navy
- Registration: 131582
- Flight origin: Buenos Aires-Ezeiza
- Destination: Galeão Air Force Base
- Occupants: 38
- Passengers: 31
- Crew: 7
- Fatalities: 35
- Survivors: 3

Second aircraft
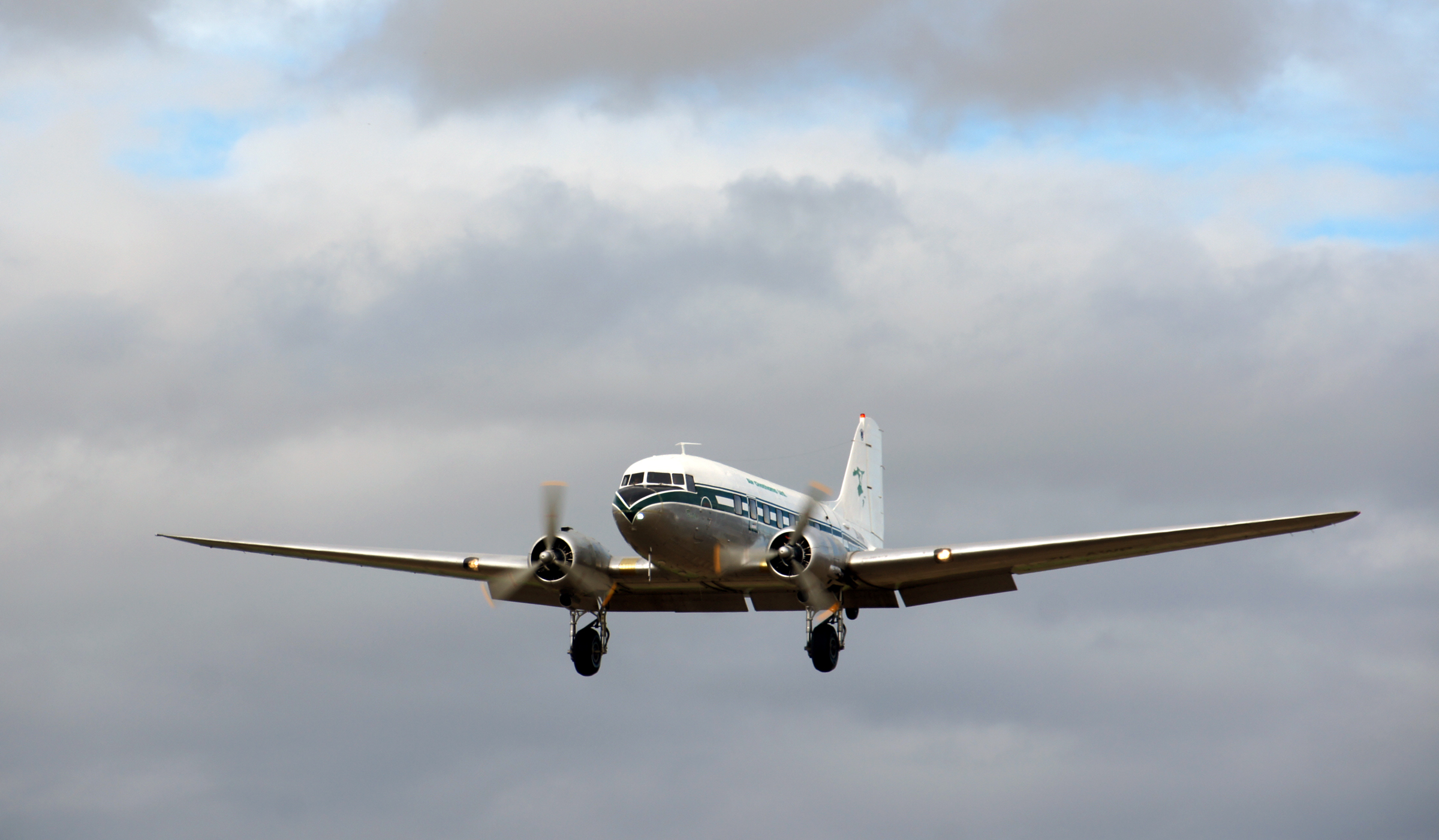
- A Douglas DC-3 similar to the accident aircraft
- Type: Douglas DC-3
- Operator: Real Transportes Aéreos
- Registration: PP-AXD
- Flight origin: Campos dos Goytacazes
- Destination: Rio de Janeiro-Santos Dumont Airport
- Occupants: 26
- Passengers: 23
- Crew: 3
- Fatalities: 26
- Survivors: 0

The 1960 Rio de Janeiro mid-air collision was an aerial collision between two aircraft over Rio de Janeiro, Brazil on February 25, 1960. A United States Navy Douglas R6D-1 (DC-6A) (BuNo 131582) flying from Buenos Aires-Ezeiza to Rio de Janeiro-Galeão Air Force Base collided over Guanabara Bay, close to the Sugarloaf Mountain, with a Real Transportes Aéreos Douglas DC-3, registration PP-AXD, operating flight 751 from Campos dos Goytacazes to Rio de Janeiro-Santos Dumont Airport. The crash occurred at 16:10 local time at an altitude of 1,600 meters (5,249 feet).

The US Navy aircraft was carrying members of the United States Navy Band to Brazil to perform at a diplomatic reception attended by US President Dwight D. Eisenhower. Of the 38 occupants of the American aircraft, 3 survived. All 26 passengers and crew of the Brazilian aircraft died.

The probable causes of the accident are disputed, but include human error, both air and ground, and faulty equipment.

== See also ==
- 2026 Rio de Janeiro mid-air collision
