= List of the busiest airports in Brazil =

The following is a list of the busiest airports in Brazil by aircraft movements (how busy the runways are) and passengers traffic (how busy the terminals are). For each airport, the lists cite the principal city associated with the airport, not (necessarily) the municipality where the airport is physically located. The tables consider only airports operated by Infraero, DAESP and Terminais Aéreos de Maringá - SBMG S.A.

== 2022 ==
=== Brazil's busiest airports by passenger traffic ===
| Rank | Airport | Location | Total passengers | Annual change | Rank change |
|---|---|---|---|---|---|
| 1 | São Paulo/Guarulhos International Airport | São Paulo | 34,480,706 | ▲42.66% | Steady |
| 2 | São Paulo–Congonhas Airport | São Paulo | 18,075,764 | ▲86.78% | ▲2 |
| 3 | Brasília International Airport | Brasília | 13,471,797 | ▲28.31% | ▼1 |
| 4 | Viracopos International Airport | Campinas | 11,845,500 | ▲17.92% | ▼1 |
| 5 | Santos Dumont Airport | Rio de Janeiro | 10,178,502 | ▲49.69% | ▲2 |
| 6 | Belo Horizonte International Airport | Belo Horizonte | 9,537,289 | ▲38.22% | Steady |
| 7 | Recife/Guararapes–Gilberto Freyre International Airport | Recife | 8,725,495 | ▲15.98% | ▼2 |
| 8 | Salgado Filho Porto Alegre International Airport | Porto Alegre | 6,571,927 | ▲37.54% | ▲1 |
| 9 | Salvador International Airport | Salvador | 6,550,280 | ▲18.05% | ▼1 |
| 10 | Galeão International Airport | Rio de Janeiro | 5,895,257 | ▲50.19% | ▲1 |
| 11 | Fortaleza Airport | Fortaleza | 5,709,106 | ▲46.53% | ▼1 |
| 12 | Afonso Pena International Airport | Curitiba | 4,888,813 | ▲57.10% | Steady |
| 13 | Hercílio Luz International Airport | Florianópolis | 3,403,571 | ▲44.29% | ▲1 |
| 14 | Belém/Val-de-Cans International Airport | Belém | 3,393,936 | ▲22.76% | ▼1 |
| 15 | Goiânia International Airport | Goiânia | 3,080,818 | ▲46.70% | ▲2 |
| 16 | Marechal Rondon International Airport | Cuiabá | 2,960,967 | ▲38.41% | ▼1 |
| 17 | Eduardo Gomes International Airport | Manaus | 2,726,909 | ▲20.72% | ▼1 |
| 18 | Eurico de Aguiar Salles Airport | Vitória | 2,668,534 | ▲29.02% | Steady |
| 19 | Zumbi dos Palmares International Airport | Maceió | 2,301,932 | ▲18.84% | Steady |
| 20 | Greater Natal International Airport | Natal | 2,064,595 | ▲13.67% | Steady |
| 21 | Porto Seguro Airport | Porto Seguro | 2,028,455 | ▲35.27% | Steady |
| 22 | Ministro Victor Konder International Airport | Navegantes | 1,940,444 | ▲38.90% | Steady |
| 23 | Foz do Iguaçu International Airport | Foz do Iguaçu | 1,505,220 | ▲58.19% | ▲3 |
| 24 | Marechal Cunha Machado International Airport | São Luís | 1,421,670 | ▲27.29% | ▼1 |
| 25 | Campo Grande International Airport | Campo Grande | 1,358,744 | ▲31.72% | Steady |
| 26 | Presidente Castro Pinto International Airport | João Pessoa | 1,231,689 | ▲19.24% | ▼2 |
| 27 | Santa Maria Airport | Aracaju | 961,575 | ▲19.90% | ▲1 |
| 28 | Teresina Airport | Teresina | 933,405 | ▲13.97% | ▼1 |
| 29 | Uberlândia Airport | Uberlândia | 819,063 | ▲34.66% | ▲1 |
| 30 | Governador Jorge Teixeira de Oliveira International Airport | Porto Velho | 700,848 | ▲5.35% | ▼1 |
| 31 | Londrina Airport | Londrina | 693,627 | ▲61.90% | ▲3 |
| 32 | Palmas Airport | Palmas | 625,462 | ▲40.64% | ▲1 |
| 33 | São José do Rio Preto Airport | São José do Rio Preto | 623,409 | ▲53.12% | ▲4 |
| 34 | Ilhéus Jorge Amado Airport | Ilhéus | 621,261 | ▲9.00% | ▼3 |
| 35 | Macapá International Airport | Macapá | 584,266 | ▲27.47% | ▼3 |
| 36 | Sílvio Name Júnior Regional Airport | Maringá | 547,652 | ▲33.77% | Steady |
| 37 | Leite Lopes Airport | Ribeirão Preto | 531,693 | ▲32.34% | ▲1 |
| 38 | Juazeiro do Norte Airport | Juazeiro do Norte | 508,194 | ▲27.61% | ▲1 |
| 39 | Chapecó Airport | Chapecó | 496,647 | ▲26.95% | ▲1 |
| 40 | Maestro Wilson Fonseca Airport | Santarém | 438,707 | ▲2.65% | ▼5 |
| 41 | Senador Nilo Coelho Airport | Petrolina | 434,019 | ▲42.22% | ▲1 |
| 42 | Boa Vista International Airport | Boa Vista | 365,150 | ▲18.71% | ▼1 |
| 43 | Rio Branco International Airport | Rio Branco | 332,390 | ▲13.15% | Steady |
| 44 | Fernando de Noronha Airport | Fernando de Noronha | 327,560 | ▲33.72% | ▲3 |
| 45 | Glauber Rocha Airport | Vitória da Conquista | 321,640 | ▲28.56% | ▲1 |
| 46 | Marabá Airport | Marabá | 312,288 | ▲16.59% | ▼1 |
| 47 | Comte. Ariston Pessoa Regional Airport | Cruz | 301,683 | ▲103.91% | ▲4 |
| 48 | Imperatriz Airport | Imperatriz | 273,351 | ▲1.94% | ▼4 |
| 49 | Cascavel Airport | Cascavel | 272,864 | ▲60.40% | Steady |
| 50 | Montes Claros Airport | Montes Claros | 251,669 | ▲71.88% | ▲2 |

== 2021 ==
=== Brazil's busiest airports by passenger traffic ===
| Rank | Airport | Location | Total passengers | Annual change | Rank change |
|---|---|---|---|---|---|
| 1 | São Paulo/Guarulhos International Airport | São Paulo | 24,170,612 | ▲18.94% | Steady |
| 2 | Brasília International Airport | Brasília | 10,499,097 | ▲33.78% | Steady |
| 3 | Viracopos International Airport | Campinas | 10,045,361 | ▲49.73% | ▲1 |
| 4 | São Paulo–Congonhas Airport | São Paulo | 9,677,569 | ▲38.96% | ▼1 |
| 5 | Recife/Guararapes–Gilberto Freyre International Airport | Recife | 7,523,046 | ▲55.50% | ▲1 |
| 6 | Belo Horizonte International Airport | Belo Horizonte | 6,899,849 | ▲43.39% | ▲1 |
| 7 | Santos Dumont Airport | Rio de Janeiro | 6,799,614 | ▲37.15% | ▼2 |
| 8 | Salvador International Airport | Salvador | 5,548,509 | ▲44.46% | ▲1 |
| 9 | Salgado Filho Porto Alegre International Airport | Porto Alegre | 4,778,056 | ▲34.15% | ▲1 |
| 10 | Galeão International Airport | Rio de Janeiro | 3,925,263 | ▼15.31% | ▼2 |
| 11 | Fortaleza Airport | Fortaleza | 3,896,165 | ▲23.43% | Steady |
| 12 | Afonso Pena International Airport | Curitiba | 3,111,942 | ▲24.06% | Steady |
| 13 | Belém/Val-de-Cans International Airport | Belém | 2,764,751 | ▲33.21% | Steady |
| 14 | Hercílio Luz International Airport | Florianópolis | 2,358,822 | ▲26.16% | Steady |
| 15 | Eduardo Gomes International Airport | Manaus | 2,258,789 | ▲30.93% | Steady |
| 16 | Marechal Rondon International Airport | Cuiabá | 2,139,211 | ▲46.84% | ▲2 |
| 17 | Goiânia International Airport | Goiânia | 2,100,107 | ▲42.46% | Steady |
| 18 | Eurico de Aguiar Salles Airport | Vitória | 2,068,235 | ▲37.64% | ▼2 |
| 19 | Zumbi dos Palmares International Airport | Maceió | 1,936,997 | ▲66.25% | ▲1 |
| 20 | Greater Natal International Airport | Natal | 1,816,362 | ▲53.25% | ▼1 |
| 21 | Porto Seguro Airport | Porto Seguro | 1,499,547 | ▲72.40% | New entry |
| 22 | Ministro Victor Konder International Airport | Navegantes | 1,396,981 | ▲51.66% | New entry |
| 23 | Marechal Cunha Machado International Airport | São Luís | 1,116,871 | ▲33.54% | New entry |
| 24 | Presidente Castro Pinto International Airport | João Pessoa | 1,032,908 | ▲36.45% | New entry |
| 25 | Campo Grande International Airport | Campo Grande | 1,031,542 | ▲44.82% | New entry |
| 26 | Foz do Iguaçu International Airport | Foz do Iguaçu | 951,540 | ▲17.62% | New entry |
| 27 | Teresina Airport | Teresina | 819,024 | ▲34.64% | New entry |
| 28 | Santa Maria Airport | Aracaju | 801,924 | ▲29.22% | New entry |
| 29 | Governador Jorge Teixeira de Oliveira International Airport | Porto Velho | 665,282 | ▲46.18% | New entry |
| 30 | Uberlândia Airport | Uberlândia | 608,242 | ▲39.65% | New entry |
| 31 | Ilhéus Jorge Amado Airport | Ilhéus | 569,937 | ▲93.55% | New entry |
| 32 | Macapá International Airport | Macapá | 458,372 | ▲23.75% | New entry |
| 33 | Palmas Airport | Palmas | 444,719 | ▲68.57% | New entry |
| 34 | Londrina Airport | Londrina | 428,428 | ▲26.41% | New entry |
| 35 | Maestro Wilson Fonseca Airport | Santarém | 427,388 | ▲34.82% | New entry |
| 36 | Sílvio Name Júnior Regional Airport | Maringá | 409,396 | ▲42.33% | New entry |
| 37 | São José do Rio Preto Airport | São José do Rio Preto | 407,137 | ▲40.47% | New entry |
| 38 | Leite Lopes Airport | Ribeirão Preto | 401,770 | ▲24.53% | New entry |
| 39 | Juazeiro do Norte Airport | Juazeiro do Norte | 398,241 | ▲36.92% | New entry |
| 40 | Chapecó Airport | Chapecó | 391,201 | ▲64.20% | New entry |
| 41 | Boa Vista International Airport | Boa Vista | 307,604 | ▲53.40% | New entry |
| 42 | Senador Nilo Coelho Airport | Petrolina | 305,170 | ▲44.74% | New entry |
| 43 | Rio Branco International Airport | Rio Branco | 293,750 | ▲53.72% | New entry |
| 44 | Imperatriz Airport | Imperatriz | 268,136 | ▲61.99% | New entry |
| 45 | Marabá Airport | Marabá | 267,856 | ▲48.13% | New entry |
| 46 | Glauber Rocha Airport | Vitória da Conquista | 250,181 | ▲29.33% | New entry |
| 47 | Fernando de Noronha Airport | Fernando de Noronha | 244,962 | ▲123.97% | New entry |
| 48 | Sinop Airport (Brazil) | Sinop | 171,358 | ▲104.27% | New entry |
| 49 | Cascavel Airport | Cascavel | 170,119 | ▲36.25% | New entry |
| 50 | Joinville Airport | Joinville | 165,733 | ▼13.45% | New entry |

== 2020 ==
=== Brazil's busiest airports by passenger traffic ===
| Rank | Airport | Location | Total passengers | Annual change | Rank change |
|---|---|---|---|---|---|
| 1 | São Paulo/Guarulhos International Airport | São Paulo | 20,322,520 | ▼52.74% | Steady |
| 2 | Brasília International Airport | Brasília | 7,848,297 | ▼53.08% | ▲1 |
| 3 | São Paulo–Congonhas Airport | São Paulo | 6,964,390 | ▼69.29% | ▼1 |
| 4 | Viracopos International Airport | Campinas | 6,709,061 | ▼36.62% | ▲2 |
| 5 | Santos Dumont Airport | Rio de Janeiro | 4,957,973 | ▼45.46% | Steady |
| 6 | Recife/Guararapes–Gilberto Freyre International Airport | Recife | 4,836,890 | ▼44.49% | ▲1 |
| 7 | Belo Horizonte International Airport | Belo Horizonte | 4,811,942 | ▼56.94% | ▲1 |
| 8 | Galeão International Airport | Rio de Janeiro | 4,635,123 | ▼65.69% | ▼4 |
| 9 | Salvador International Airport | Salvador | 3,840,940 | ▼50.67% | Steady |
| 10 | Salgado Filho Porto Alegre International Airport | Porto Alegre | 3,561,630 | ▼56.39% | Steady |
| 11 | Fortaleza Airport | Fortaleza | 3,156,418 | ▼55.14% | Steady |
| 12 | Afonso Pena International Airport | Curitiba | 2,508,359 | ▼61.43% | Steady |
| 13 | Belém/Val-de-Cans International Airport | Belém | 2,075,540 | ▼42.80% | ▲1 |
| 14 | Hercílio Luz International Airport | Florianópolis | 1,869,671 | ▼52.33% | ▼1 |
| 15 | Eduardo Gomes International Airport | Manaus | 1,725,236 | ▼43.86% | ▲1 |
| 16 | Eurico de Aguiar Salles Airport | Vitória | 1,502,639 | ▼55.00% | ▼1 |
| 17 | Goiânia International Airport | Goiânia | 1,474,160 | ▼55.37% | Steady |
| 18 | Marechal Rondon International Airport | Cuiabá | 1,460,843 | ▼51.01% | Steady |
| 19 | Greater Natal International Airport | Natal | 1,185,208 | ▼49.15% | Steady |
| 20 | Zumbi dos Palmares International Airport | Maceió | 1,165,064 | ▼45.27% | New entry |

== 2019 ==
=== Brazil's busiest airports by passenger traffic ===
| Rank | Airport | Location | Total passengers | Annual change | Rank change |
|---|---|---|---|---|---|
| 1 | Guarulhos International Airport | São Paulo | 43,002,419 | ▲0.04% | Steady |
| 2 | Congonhas Airport | São Paulo | 21,968,834 | ▲1.96% | Steady |
| 3 | Presidente Juscelino Kubitschek International Airport | Brasília | 16,727,177 | ▼5.08% | Steady |
| 4 | Galeão International Airport | Rio de Janeiro | 13,508,309 | ▼9.98% | Steady |
| 5 | Tancredo Neves-Confins International Airport | Belo Horizonte | 11,173,878 | ▲5.50% | Steady |
| 6 | Viracopos International Airport | Campinas | 10,585,018 | ▲14.77% | Steady |
| 7 | Santos Dumont Airport | Rio de Janeiro | 8,976,486 | ▼1.45% | Steady |
| 8 | Guararapes-Gilberto Freyre International Airport | Recife | 8,531,312 | ▲1.35% | Steady |
| 9 | Salgado Filho International Airport | Porto Alegre | 8,298,205 | ▼0.04% | Steady |
| 10 | Salvador International Airport | Salvador | 7,786,582 | ▲TBD% | Steady |
| 11 | Pinto Martins International Airport | Fortaleza | 7,218,697 | ▲9.14% | Steady |
| 12 | Afonso Pena International Airport | Curitiba | 6,405,506 | ▲1.85% | Steady |
| 13 | Val de Cães International Airport | Belém | 3,576,481 | ▲2.01% | ▲1 |
| 14 | Hercílio Luz International Airport | Florianópolis | 3,300,289 | ▼14.04% | ▼1 |
| 15 | Eurico de Aguiar Salles Airport | Vitória | 3,288,967 | ▲8.84% | ▲1 |
| 16 | Santa Genoveva Airport | Goiânia | 3,251,176 | ▲1.23% | ▼1 |
| 17 | Eduardo Gomes International Airport | Manaus | 3,008,587 | ▲8.98% | ▲1 |
| 18 | Marechal Rondon Airport | Cuiabá | 2,938,141 | ▼2.28% | ▼1 |
| 19 | Greater Natal International Airport | Natal | 2,330,725 | ▼4.06% | Steady |
| 20 | Foz do Iguaçu International Airport | Foz do Iguaçu | 2,278,419 | ▼2.67% | Steady |

== 2018 ==
=== Brazil's busiest airports by passenger traffic ===
| Rank | Airport | Location | Total passengers | Annual change | |
|---|---|---|---|---|---|
| 1 | Guarulhos International Airport | São Paulo | 42,831,981 | ▲13.25% | Steady |
| 2 | Congonhas Airport | São Paulo | 21,546,480 | ▼-1.40% | Steady |
| 3 | Presidente Juscelino Kubitschek International Airport | Brasília | 17,622,873 | ▲4,20% | Steady |
| 4 | Galeão International Airport | Rio de Janeiro | 15,005,304 | ▼-7.62% | Steady |
| 5 | Tancredo Neves-Confins International Airport | Belo Horizonte | 10,591,138 | ▲4.20% | Steady |
| 6 | Viracopos International Airport | Campinas | 9,223,074 | ▼-1,10% | Steady |
| 7 | Santos Dumont Airport | Rio de Janeiro | 9,108,564 | ▼-1.50% | Steady |
| 8 | Guararapes-Gilberto Freyre International Airport | Recife | 8,399,935 | ▲8,01% | ▲1 |
| 9 | Salgado Filho International Airport | Porto Alegre | 8,301,172 | ▲3.61% | ▼1 |
| 10 | Salvador International Airport | Salvador | 8,001,175 | ▲1.27% | Steady |
| 11 | Pinto Martins International Airport | Fortaleza | 6,614,227 | ▲11.44% | ▲1 |
| 12 | Afonso Pena International Airport | Curitiba | 6,289,075 | ▼-6.40% | ▼1 |
| 13 | Hercílio Luz International Airport | Florianópolis | 3,839,348 | ▼-0.10% | Steady |
| 14 | Val de Cães International Airport | Belém | 3,505,903 | ▲5.80% | Steady |
| 15 | Santa Genoveva Airport | Goiânia | 3,211,536 | ▲3.90% | Steady |
| 16 | Eurico de Aguiar Salles Airport | Vitória | 3,021,949 | ▼-0.23% | Steady |
| 17 | Marechal Rondon Airport | Cuiabá | 3,006,701 | ▲4.30% | Steady |
| 18 | Eduardo Gomes International Airport | Manaus | 2,760,626 | ▲4.30% | Steady |
| 19 | Greater Natal International Airport | Natal | 2,429,398 | ▲1,10% | Steady |
| 20 | Foz do Iguaçu International Airport | Foz do Iguaçu | 2,340,950 | ▲7,9% | Steady |

== 2017 ==
=== Brazil's 50 busiest airports by passenger traffic ===
| Rank | Airport | Location | Total passengers | Annual change | |
|---|---|---|---|---|---|
| 1 | Guarulhos International Airport | São Paulo | 37,816,000 | ▲3.33% | Steady |
| 2 | Congonhas Airport | São Paulo | 21,859,453 | ▲5.00% | Steady |
| 3 | Presidente Juscelino Kubitschek International Airport | Brasília | 16,912,680 | ▼5.76% | Steady |
| 4 | Galeão International Airport | Rio de Janeiro | 16,245,094 | ▲0.88% | Steady |
| 5 | Tancredo Neves-Confins International Airport | Belo Horizonte | 10,164,077 | ▲5.49% | Steady |
| 6 | Viracopos International Airport | Campinas | 9,332,631 | ▲0.08% | Steady |
| 7 | Santos Dumont Airport | Rio de Janeiro | 9,247,185 | ▲2.00% | Steady |
| 8 | Salgado Filho International Airport | Porto Alegre | 8,012,114 | ▲4.75% | Steady |
| 9 | Guararapes-Gilberto Freyre International Airport | Recife | 7,776,881 | ▲14.17% | ▲1 |
| 10 | Salvador International Airport | Salvador | 7,735,685 | ▲2.78% | ▼1 |
| 11 | Afonso Pena International Airport | Curitiba | 6,722,058 | ▲5.26% | Steady |
| 12 | Pinto Martins International Airport | Fortaleza | 5,935,288 | ▲4.00% | Steady |
| 13 | Hercílio Luz International Airport | Florianópolis | 3,843,328 | ▲8.67% | Steady |
| 14 | Val de Cães International Airport | Belém | 3,311,817 | ▲0.89% | Steady |
| 15 | Santa Genoveva Airport | Goiânia | 3,088,274 | ▲2.37% | ▲1 |
| 16 | Eurico de Aguiar Salles Airport | Vitória | 3,021,949 | ▼3.15% | ▼1 |
| 17 | Marechal Rondon Airport | Cuiabá | 2,882,450 | ▲1.47% | Steady |
| 18 | Eduardo Gomes International Airport | Manaus | 2,645,205 | ▼0.24% | Steady |
| 19 | Greater Natal International Airport | Natal | 2,403,135 | ▲3.75% | Steady |
| 20 | Foz do Iguaçu International Airport | Foz do Iguaçu | 2,177,298 | ▲17.62% | ▲1 |
| 21 | Zumbi dos Palmares International Airport | Maceió | 2,068,245 | ▲3.67% | ▼1 |
| 22 | Porto Seguro Airport | Porto Seguro | 1,716,037 | ▲7.14% | Steady |
| 23 | Marechal Cunha Machado International Airport | São Luís | 1,601,836 | ▲5.32% | Steady |
| 24 | Ministro Victor Konder International Airport | Navegantes | 1,588,921 | ▲8.01% | Steady |
| 25 | Campo Grande International Airport | Campo Grande | 1,536,838 | ▲5.33% | Steady |
| 26 | Presidente Castro Pinto International Airport | João Pessoa | 1,387,496 | ▼2.17% | Steady |
| 27 | Santa Maria Airport | Aracaju | 1,225,789 | ▲0.02% | Steady |
| 28 | Teresina Airport | Teresina | 1,104,451 | ▲1.70% | Steady |
| 29 | Uberlândia Airport | Uberlândia | 1,102,569 | ▲4.97% | Steady |
| 30 | Londrina Airport | Londrina | 880,429 | ▼4.38% | ▲1 |
| 31 | Leite Lopes Airport | Ribeirão Preto | 867,544 | ▼5.98% | ▼1 |
| 32 | Governador Jorge Teixeira de Oliveira International Airport | Porto Velho | 794,109 | ▼5.46% | Steady |
| 33 | São José do Rio Preto Airport | São José do Rio Preto | 728,162 | ▲4.62% | ▲1 |
| 34 | Sílvio Name Júnior Regional Airport | Maringá | 658,000 | ▼5.47% | ▼1 |
| 35 | Palmas Airport | Palmas | 654,397 | ▲5.94% | Steady |
| 36 | Ilhéus Jorge Amado Airport | Ilhéus | 596,351 | ▲3.36% | Steady |
| 37 | Macapá International Airport | Macapá | 576,257 | ▲1.30% | Steady |
| 38 | Juazeiro do Norte Airport | Juazeiro do Norte | 542,400 | ▲1.43% | Steady |
| 39 | Joinville Airport | Joinville | 515,832 | ▼0.62% | Steady |
| 40 | Senador Nilo Coelho Airport | Petrolina | 485,495 | ▲8.48% | ▲1 |
| 41 | Chapecó Airport | Chapeco | 467,930 | ▲11.44% | ▲2 |
| 42 | Maestro Wilson Fonseca Airport | Santarém | 452,966 | ▼7.56% | ▼1 |
| 43 | Rio Branco International Airport | Rio Branco | 345,079 | ▼2.58% | Steady |
| 44 | Imperatriz Airport | Imperatriz | 300,023 | ▲5.56% | ▲4 |
| 45 | Boa Vista International Airport | Boa Vista | 283,699 | ▼2.56% | ▲2 |
| 46 | Marabá Airport | Marabá | 280,174 | ▼11.79% | ▼1 |
| 47 | Montes Claros Airport | Montes Claros | 280,022 | ▼0.70% | ▲2 |
| 48 | Presidente Prudente Airport | Presidente Prudente | 256,883 | ▼0.49% | ▲2 |
| 49 | Fernando de Noronha Airport | Fernando de Noronha | 248,248 | ▲7.70% | ▲? |
| 50 | Pampulha Airport | Belo Horizonte | 234,675 | ▼21.79% | ▼4 |

== 2016 ==
=== Brazil's 40 busiest airports by passenger traffic ===
| Rank | Airport | Location | Total passengers | Annual change | |
|---|---|---|---|---|---|
| 1 | Guarulhos International Airport | São Paulo | 36,596,326 | ▼6.13% | Steady |
| 2 | Congonhas Airport | São Paulo | 20,816,957 | ▲7.97% | ▲1 |
| 3 | Presidente Juscelino Kubitschek International Airport | Brasília | 17,947,153 | ▼9.46% | ▼1 |
| 4 | Galeão International Airport | Rio de Janeiro | 16,103,011 | ▼4.95% | Steady |
| 5 | Tancredo Neves-Confins International Airport | Belo Horizonte | 9,638,798 | ▼14.73% | Steady |
| 6 | Viracopos International Airport | Campinas | 9,325,252 | ▼9.68% | Steady |
| 7 | Santos Dumont Airport | Rio de Janeiro | 9,065,905 | ▼5.74% | Steady |
| 8 | Salgado Filho International Airport | Porto Alegre | 7,648,743 | ▼8.45% | ▲1 |
| 9 | Salvador International Airport | Salvador | 7,526,358 | ▼16.81% | ▼1 |
| 10 | Guararapes-Gilberto Freyre International Airport | Recife | 6,811,676 | ▲1.66% | ▲1 |
| 11 | Afonso Pena International Airport | Curitiba | 6,385,838 | ▼11.74% | ▼1 |
| 12 | Pinto Martins International Airport | Fortaleza | 5,706,489 | ▼10.10% | Steady |
| 13 | Hercílio Luz International Airport | Florianópolis | 3,536,435 | ▼4.25% | ▲1 |
| 14 | Val de Cães International Airport | Belém | 3,282,513 | ▼11.64% | ▼1 |
| 15 | Eurico de Aguiar Salles Airport | Vitória | 3,120,166 | ▼12.94% | Steady |
| 16 | Santa Genoveva Airport | Goiânia | 3,016,798 | ▼8.92% | Steady |
| 17 | Marechal Rondon Airport | Cuiabá | 2,840,559 | ▼14.14% | Steady |
| 18 | Eduardo Gomes International Airport | Manaus | 2,651,452 | ▼18.62% | Steady |
| 19 | Greater Natal International Airport | Natal | 2,316,349 | ▼10.37% | Steady |
| 20 | Zumbi dos Palmares International Airport | Maceió | 1,995,069 | ▲0.64% | ▲1 |
| 21 | Foz do Iguaçu International Airport | Foz do Iguaçu | 1,851,116 | ▼9.97% | ▼1 |
| 22 | Porto Seguro Airport | Porto Seguro | 1,601,600 | ▲10.04% | ▲4 |
| 23 | Marechal Cunha Machado International Airport | São Luís | 1,520,847 | ▼10.59% | ▼1 |
| 24 | Ministro Victor Konder International Airport | Navegantes | 1,471,037 | ▼0.83% | Steady |
| 25 | Campo Grande International Airport | Campo Grande | 1,459,007 | ▼6.21% | ▼2 |
| 26 | Presidente Castro Pinto International Airport | João Pessoa | 1,418,380 | ▼3.07% | ▼1 |
| 27 | Santa Maria Airport | Aracaju | 1,225,591 | ▼4.27% | Steady |
| 28 | Teresina Airport | Teresina | 1,085,974 | ▼10.22% | Steady |
| 29 | Uberlândia Airport | Uberlândia | 1,050,330 | ▼10.15% | Steady |
| 30 | Leite Lopes Airport | Ribeirão Preto | 922,756 | ▼16.85% | Steady |
| 31 | Londrina Airport | Londrina | 920,782 | ▼12.90% | Steady |
| 32 | Governador Jorge Teixeira de Oliveira International Airport | Porto Velho | 840,026 | ▼10.03% | Steady |
| 33 | Sílvio Name Júnior Regional Airport | Maringá | 696,131 | ▼20.57% | Steady |
| 34 | São José do Rio Preto Airport | São José do Rio Preto | 695,997 | ▲0.64% | ▲1 |
| 35 | Palmas Airport | Palmas | 617,703 | ▼4.11% | ▲3 |
| 36 | Ilhéus Jorge Amado Airport | Ilhéus | 596,351 | ▲3.36% | Steady |
| 37 | Macapá International Airport | Macapá | 568,873 | ▼14.74% | ▼1 |
| 38 | Juazeiro do Norte Airport | Juazeiro do Norte | 534,712 | ▲20.32% | ▲4 |
| 39 | Joinville Airport | Joinville | 515,832 | ▼0.62% | ▲1 |
| 40 | Maestro Wilson Fonseca Airport | Santarém | 490,017 | ▼25.57% | ▼3 |

== 2015 ==
=== Brazil's 40 busiest airports by passenger traffic ===
| Rank | Airport | Location | Total passengers | Annual change | |
|---|---|---|---|---|---|
| 1 | Guarulhos International Airport | São Paulo | 38,985,000 | ▼1.49% | Steady |
| 2 | Presidente Juscelino Kubitschek International Airport | Brasília | 19,821,796 | ▲9.23% | Steady |
| 3 | Congonhas Airport | São Paulo | 18,134,768 | ▲6.31% | Steady |
| 4 | Galeão International Airport | Rio de Janeiro | 16,942,229 | ▼1.85% | Steady |
| 5 | Tancredo Neves-Confins International Airport | Belo Horizonte | 11,304,284 | ▲4.26% | Steady |
| 6 | Viracopos International Airport | Campinas | 10,324,658 | ▲4.85% | Steady |
| 7 | Santos Dumont Airport | Rio de Janeiro | 9,618,197 | ▼1.26% | Steady |
| 8 | Salvador International Airport | Salvador | 9,047,403 | ▼1.14% | Steady |
| 9 | Salgado Filho International Airport | Porto Alegre | 8,354,961 | ▼1.09% | Steady |
| 10 | Afonso Pena International Airport | Curitiba | 7,235,634 | ▼1.91% | Steady |
| 11 | Guararapes-Gilberto Freyre International Airport | Recife | 6,700,696 | ▼6.96% | Steady |
| 12 | Pinto Martins International Airport | Fortaleza | 6,347,543 | ▼2.37% | Steady |
| 13 | Val de Cães International Airport | Belém | 3,714,761 | ▼4.52% | Steady |
| 14 | Hercílio Luz International Airport | Florianópolis | 3,693,486 | ▲1.77% | Steady |
| 15 | Eurico de Aguiar Salles Airport | Vitória | 3,583,875 | ▲1.74% | Steady |
| 16 | Santa Genoveva Airport | Goiânia | 3,312,290 | ▼1.51% | ▲1 |
| 17 | Marechal Rondon Airport | Cuiabá | 3,308,289 | ▲0.16% | ▲1 |
| 18 | Eduardo Gomes International Airport | Manaus | 3,258,157 | ▼3.89% | ▼2 |
| 19 | Greater Natal International Airport | Natal | 2,584,355 | ▲72.78% | ▲5 |
| 20 | Foz do Iguaçu International Airport | Foz do Iguaçu | 2,056,050 | ▲9.33% | Steady |
| 21 | Zumbi dos Palmares International Airport | Maceió | 1,982,393 | ▲4.68% | ▼2 |
| 22 | Marechal Cunha Machado International Airport | São Luís | 1,701,015 | ▼7.24% | ▼1 |
| 23 | Campo Grande International Airport | Campo Grande | 1,555,602 | ▼5.06% | ▼1 |
| 24 | Ministro Victor Konder International Airport | Navegantes | 1,483,308 | ▲9.75% | ▲2 |
| 25 | Presidente Castro Pinto International Airport | João Pessoa | 1,463,315 | ▲10.25% | ▲2 |
| 26 | Porto Seguro Airport | Porto Seguro | 1,455,384 | ▼3.94% | ▼3 |
| 27 | Santa Maria Airport | Aracaju | 1,280,236 | ▼4.74% | ▼2 |
| 28 | Teresina Airport | Teresina | 1,209,559 | ▲3.06% | Steady |
| 29 | Uberlândia Airport | Uberlândia | 1,168,978 | ▲2.75% | Steady |
| 30 | Leite Lopes Airport | Ribeirão Preto | 1,109,809 | ▲2.81% | ▲1 |
| 31 | Londrina Airport | Londrina | 1,057,163 | ▼6.61% | ▼1 |
| 32 | Governador Jorge Teixeira de Oliveira International Airport | Porto Velho | 933,666 | ▲4.58% | ▲2 |
| 33 | Sílvio Name Júnior Regional Airport | Maringá | 876,461 | ▲5.45% | ▲2 |
| 34 | Belo Horizonte/Pampulha – Carlos Drummond de Andrade Airport | Belo Horizonte | 712,553 | ▼24.63% | ▼1 |
| 35 | São José do Rio Preto Airport | São José do Rio Preto | 691,559 | ▼3.56% | ▲2 |
| 36 | Macapá International Airport | Macapá | 667,230 | ▼10.86% | Steady |
| 37 | Maestro Wilson Fonseca Airport | Santarém | 658,334 | ▲8.95% | ▲2 |
| 38 | Palmas Airport | Palmas | 644,199 | ▲1.59% | Steady |
| 39 | Ilhéus Jorge Amado Airport | Ilhéus | 616,665 | ▲9.69% | ▲1 |
| 40 | Joinville Airport | Joinville | 519,062 | ▲5.24% | ▲2 |

== 2014 ==
=== Brazil's 40 busiest airports by passenger traffic ===
| Rank | Airport | Location | Total passengers | Annual change | |
|---|---|---|---|---|---|
| 1 | Guarulhos International Airport | São Paulo | 39,573,000 | ▲8.53% | Steady |
| 2 | Presidente Juscelino Kubitschek International Airport | Brasília | 18,146,405 | ▲10.04% | ▲2 |
| 3 | Congonhas Airport | São Paulo | 18,134,768 | ▲5.93% | ▼1 |
| 4 | Galeão International Airport | Rio de Janeiro | 17,261,873 | ▲0.85% | ▼1 |
| 5 | Tancredo Neves-Confins International Airport | Belo Horizonte | 10,842,523 | ▲5.25% | Steady |
| 6 | Viracopos International Airport | Campinas | 9,846,853 | ▲5.94% | Steady |
| 7 | Santos Dumont Airport | Rio de Janeiro | 9,741,219 | ▲5.83% | Steady |
| 8 | Salvador International Airport | Salvador | 9,152,159 | ▲6.54% | Steady |
| 9 | Salgado Filho International Airport | Porto Alegre | 8,447,380 | ▲5.68% | Steady |
| 10 | Afonso Pena International Airport | Curitiba | 7,376,743 | ▲9.41% | ▲1 |
| 11 | Guararapes-Gilberto Freyre International Airport | Recife | 7,190,381 | ▲5.11% | ▼1 |
| 12 | Pinto Martins International Airport | Fortaleza | 6,501,822 | ▲9.09% | Steady |
| 13 | Val de Cães International Airport | Belém | 3,890,791 | ▲11.94% | ▲1 |
| 14 | Hercílio Luz International Airport | Florianópolis | 3,629,074 | ▼6.29% | ▼1 |
| 15 | Eurico de Aguiar Salles Airport | Vitória | 3,522,674 | ▲2.08% | Steady |
| 16 | Eduardo Gomes International Airport | Manaus | 3,389,867 | ▲10.16% | Steady |
| 17 | Santa Genoveva Airport | Goiânia | 3,363,192 | ▲12.08% | Steady |
| 18 | Marechal Rondon Airport | Cuiabá | 3,302,940 | ▲10.79% | Steady |
| 19 | Zumbi dos Palmares International Airport | Maceió | 1,893,688 | ▼2.55% | ▲1 |
| 20 | Foz do Iguaçu International Airport | Foz do Iguaçu | 1,880,564 | ▲12.10% | ▲2 |
| 21 | Marechal Cunha Machado International Airport | São Luís | 1,833,799 | ▲0.98% | Steady |
| 22 | Campo Grande International Airport | Campo Grande | 1,638,513 | ▲2.89% | ▲1 |
| 23 | Porto Seguro Airport | Porto Seguro | 1,512,028 | ▲13.84% | ▲2 |
| 24 | Greater Natal International Airport (Note: initiated operations on 1 June 2014) | Natal | 1,495,724 | N/A | N/A |
| 25 | Santa Maria Airport | Aracaju | 1,343,899 | ▼2.14% | ▼1 |
| 26 | Ministro Victor Konder International Airport | Navegantes | 1,351,557 | ▲12.96% | ▲1 |
| 27 | Presidente Castro Pinto International Airport | João Pessoa | 1,327,284 | ▲7.88% | ▼1 |
| 28 | Teresina Airport | Teresina | 1,173,643 | ▲7.55% | ▲1 |
| 29 | Uberlândia Airport | Uberlândia | 1,137,727 | ▲0.07% | ▼1 |
| 30 | Londrina Airport | Londrina | 1,131,995 | ▲7.69% | ▲1 |
| 31 | Leite Lopes Airport | Ribeirão Preto | 1,079,430 | ▼1.42% | ▼2 |
| 32 | Augusto Severo International Airport (Note: ceased civil operations on 31 May 2014) | Natal | 1,021,147 | ▼57.60% | ▼12 |
| 33 | Belo Horizonte/Pampulha – Carlos Drummond de Andrade Airport | Belo Horizonte | 945,434 | ▼4.46% | ▼1 |
| 34 | Governador Jorge Teixeira de Oliveira International Airport | Porto Velho | 892,760 | ▼1.45% | ▼1 |
| 35 | Sílvio Name Júnior Regional Airport | Maringá | 831,134 | ▲14.17% | Steady |
| 36 | Macapá International Airport | Macapá | 748,480 | ▲12.80% | Steady |
| 37 | São José do Rio Preto Airport | São José do Rio Preto | 717,118 | ▼5.45% | ▼3 |
| 38 | Palmas Airport | Palmas | 634,128 | ▲9.97% | ▼1 |
| 39 | Maestro Wilson Fonseca Airport | Santarém | 604,234 | ▲16.44% | ▼1 |
| 40 | Ilhéus Jorge Amado Airport | Ilhéus | 562,203 | ▲11.90% | ▼1 |

== 2013 ==
=== Brazil's 40 busiest airports by passenger traffic ===
| Rank | Airport | Location | Total passengers | Annual change | |
|---|---|---|---|---|---|
| 1 | Guarulhos International Airport | São Paulo | 36,460,923 | ▲11.23% | Steady |
| 2 | Congonhas Airport | São Paulo | 17,119,530 | ▲2.04% | ▲1 |
| 3 | Galeão International Airport | Rio de Janeiro | 17,115,368 | ▼2.17% | ▼1 |
| 4 | Presidente Juscelino Kubitschek International Airport | Brasília | 16,489,996 | ▲3.76% | Steady |
| 5 | Tancredo Neves-Confins International Airport | Belo Horizonte | 10,301,288 | ▼0.93% | Steady |
| 6 | Viracopos International Airport | Campinas | 9,294,446 | ▲4.92% | ▲1 |
| 7 | Santos Dumont Airport | Rio de Janeiro | 9,204,603 | ▲2.24% | ▼1 |
| 8 | Salvador International Airport | Salvador | 8,589,663 | ▼2.51% | Steady |
| 9 | Salgado Filho International Airport | Porto Alegre | 7,993,164 | ▼3.24% | Steady |
| 10 | Guararapes-Gilberto Freyre International Airport | Recife | 6,840,276 | ▲6.32% | ▲1 |
| 11 | Afonso Pena International Airport | Curitiba | 6,742,133 | ▼1.26% | ▼1 |
| 12 | Pinto Martins International Airport | Fortaleza | 5,959,629 | ▼0.07% | Steady |
| 13 | Hercílio Luz International Airport | Florianópolis | 3,872,877 | ▲14.06% | ▲2 |
| 14 | Val de Cães International Airport | Belém | 3,475,611 | ▲3.97% | Steady |
| 15 | Eurico de Aguiar Salles Airport | Vitória | 3,450,736 | ▼5.27% | ▼2 |
| 16 | Eduardo Gomes International Airport | Manaus | 3,077,077 | ▼1.72% | Steady |
| 17 | Santa Genoveva Airport | Goiânia | 3,000,592 | ▼2.47% | Steady |
| 18 | Marechal Rondon Airport | Cuiabá | 2,981,025 | ▲7.94% | Steady |
| 19 | Augusto Severo International Airport | Natal | 2,408,206 | ▼9.49% | Steady |
| 20 | Zumbi dos Palmares International Airport | Maceió | 1,943,435 | ▲12.99% | ▲2 |
| 21 | Marechal Cunha Machado International Airport | São Luís | 1,815,909 | ▼8.79% | ▼1 |
| 22 | Foz do Iguaçu International Airport | Foz do Iguaçu | 1,677,460 | ▼3.67% | ▼1 |
| 23 | Campo Grande International Airport | Campo Grande | 1,592,471 | ▼3.78% | Steady |
| 24 | Santa Maria Airport | Aracaju | 1,343,899 | ▼2.14% | Steady |
| 25 | Porto Seguro Airport | Porto Seguro | 1,328,197 | ▲9.58% | ▲2 |
| 26 | Presidente Castro Pinto International Airport | João Pessoa | 1,230,230 | ▼1.78% | Steady |
| 27 | Ministro Victor Konder International Airport | Navegantes | 1,203,561 | ▼5.78% | ▼2 |
| 28 | Uberlândia Airport | Uberlândia | 1,136,908 | ▲12.39% | ▲4 |
| 29 | Leite Lopes Airport | Ribeirão Preto | 1,095,008 | ▲1.67% | Steady |
| 30 | Teresina Airport | Teresina | 1,091,242 | ▲4.43% | ▲1 |
| 31 | Londrina Airport | Londrina | 1,051,157 | ▼4.34% | ▼3 |
| 32 | Belo Horizonte/Pampulha – Carlos Drummond de Andrade Airport | Belo Horizonte | 989,599 | ▲27.7% | ▲2 |
| 33 | Governador Jorge Teixeira de Oliveira International Airport | Porto Velho | 905,958 | ▼13.77% | ▼3 |
| 34 | São José do Rio Preto Airport | São José do Rio Preto | 758,513 | ▼1.56% | ▼1 |
| 35 | Sílvio Name Júnior Regional Airport | Maringá | 727,928 | ▼3.93% | Steady |
| 36 | Macapá International Airport | Macapá | 663,524 | ▲15.68% | ▲1 |
| 37 | Palmas Airport | Palmas | 576,633 | ▼0.47% | ▼1 |
| 38 | Maestro Wilson Fonseca Airport | Santarém | 518,920 | ▲6.51% | ▲1 |
| 39 | Ilhéus Jorge Amado Airport | Ilhéus | 502,390 | ▼5.58% | ▼1 |
| 40 | Senador Nilo Coelho Airport | Petrolina | 473,482 | ▲3.24% | Steady |

== 2012 ==
=== Brazil's 25 busiest airports by aircraft movements ===
| Rank | Airport | Location | Movements | Annual change | Rank change |
|---|---|---|---|---|---|
| 1 | Guarulhos International Airport | São Paulo | 273,882 | ▲1.21% | Steady |
| 2 | Congonhas Airport | São Paulo | 213,164 | ▲1.91% | Steady |
| 3 | Presidente Juscelino Kubitschek International Airport | Brasília | 194,686 | ▲2.69% | Steady |
| 4 | Galeão International Airport | Rio de Janeiro | 154,318 | ▲10.66% | Steady |
| 5 | Campo de Marte Airport | São Paulo | 143,540 | ▲7.50% | Steady |
| 6 | Santos Dumont Airport | Rio de Janeiro | 135,373 | ▲4.11% | Steady |
| 7 | Deputado Luís Eduardo Magalhães International Airport | Salvador | 121,596 | ▼3.48% | Steady |
| 8 | Tancredo Neves International Airport | Belo Horizonte | 120,149 | ▲11.11% | Steady |
| 9 | Viracopos International Airport | Campinas | 115,548 | ▲15.56% | Steady |
| 10 | Rolim Adolfo Amaro Airport | Jundiaí | 99,284 | ▲23.18% | ▲3 |
| 11 | Salgado Filho International Airport | Porto Alegre | 96,696 | ▼2.90% | ▼1 |
| 12 | Afonso Pena International Airport | Curitiba | 88,960 | ▼5.50% | ▼1 |
| 13 | Guararapes-Gilberto Freyre International Airport | Recife | 82,997 | ▼0.76% | ▼1 |
| 14 | Sorocaba Airport | Sorocaba | 77,420 | ▲18.38% | ▲5 |
| 15 | Jacarepaguá Airport | Rio de Janeiro | 75,990 | ▲5.08% | ▼1 |
| 16 | Pampulha - Carlos Drummond de Andrade Airport | Belo Horizonte | 72,902 | ▲10.68% | ▲1 |
| 17 | Santa Genoveva Airport | Goiânia | 71,030 | ▲1.28% | ▼1 |
| 18 | Macaé Airport | Macaé | 68,238 | ▼3.50% | ▼3 |
| 19 | Pinto Martins International Airport | Fortaleza | 65,388 | ▼0.70% | ▼1 |
| 20 | Eurico de Aguiar Salles Airport | Vitória | 63,777 | ▲11.31% | ▲1 |
| 21 | Leite Lopes Airport | Ribeirão Preto | 60,538 | ▲11.69% | ▲3 |
| 22 | Marechal Rondon Airport | Cuiabá | 60,138 | ▲5.31% | Steady |
| 23 | Eduardo Gomes International Airport | Manaus | 57,575 | ▲2.26% | Steady |
| 24 | Hercílio Luz International Airport | Florianópolis | 56,086 | ▲14.23% | ▲2 |
| 25 | Val de Cães International Airport | Belém | 54,836 | ▲6.01% | Steady |

== 2011 ==
=== Brazil's 25 busiest airports by aircraft movements ===
| Rank | Airport | Location | Movements | Annual change | Rank change |
|---|---|---|---|---|---|
| 1 | Guarulhos International Airport | São Paulo | 270,601 | ▲8.03% | Steady |
| 2 | Congonhas Airport | São Paulo | 209,156 | ▲2.05% | Steady |
| 3 | Brasília International Airport | Brasília | 189,570 | ▲7.51% | Steady |
| 4 | Galeão International Airport | Rio de Janeiro | 139,441 | ▲13.42% | ▲2 |
| 5 | Campo de Marte Airport | São Paulo | 133,524 | ▲8.55% | Steady |
| 6 | Santos Dumont Airport | Rio de Janeiro | 130,026 | ▲2.77% | ▼2 |
| 7 | Deputado Luís Eduardo Magalhães International Airport | Salvador | 125,992 | ▲9.61% | Steady |
| 8 | Tancredo Neves International Airport | Belo Horizonte | 108,130 | ▲27.43% | ▲2 |
| 9 | Viracopos International Airport | Campinas | 99,982 | ▲34.25% | ▲4 |
| 10 | Salgado Filho International Airport | Porto Alegre | 99,584 | ▲9.88% | ▼2 |
| 11 | Afonso Pena International Airport | Curitiba | 94,143 | ▲6.72% | ▼2 |
| 12 | Guararapes-Gilberto Freyre International Airport | Recife | 83,638 | ▲8.17% | Steady |
| 13 | Rolim Adolfo Amaro Airport | Jundiaí | 80,598 | ▲3.20% | ▼2 |
| 14 | Jacarepaguá Airport | Rio de Janeiro | 72,316 | ▲1.88% | Steady |
| 15 | Macaé Airport | Macaé | 70,716 | ▲8.54% | ▲2 |
| 16 | Santa Genoveva Airport | Goiânia | 70,128 | ▲8.42% | ▲2 |
| 17 | Pampulha - Carlos Drummond de Andrade Airport | Belo Horizonte | 65,862 | ▼1.18% | ▼2 |
| 18 | Pinto Martins International Airport | Fortaleza | 65,853 | ▲5.25% | ▲1 |
| 19 | Sorocaba Airport | Sorocaba | 65,395 | ▲54.18% | ▲6 |
| 20 | Campo dos Amarais Airport | Campinas | 65,380 | ▲37.77% | ▼4 |
| 21 | Eurico de Aguiar Salles Airport | Vitória | 57,293 | ▲7.37% | ▼1 |
| 22 | Marechal Rondon Airport | Cuiabá | 57,101 | ▲6.12% | ▼1 |
| 23 | Eduardo Gomes International Airport | Manaus | 56,298 | ▲7.22% | ▼1 |
| 24 | Leite Lopes Airport | Ribeirão Preto | 54,201 | ▲24.06% | ▲1 |
| 25 | Val de Cães International Airport | Belém | 51,726 | ▲14.18% | ▼1 |

== 2010 ==
=== Brazil's 20 busiest airports by passenger traffic ===
| Rank | Airport | Location | Total passengers | Annual change | Rank change | Capacity | Capacity in use |
|---|---|---|---|---|---|---|---|
| 1 | São Paulo-Guarulhos International Airport | São Paulo | 26,849,185 | ▲23.57% | Steady | 20,500,000 | 130.97% |
| 2 | Congonhas-São Paulo Airport | São Paulo | 15,499,462 | ▲13.14% | Steady | 12,000,000 | 129.16% |
| 3 | Brasília International Airport | Brasília | 14,347,061 | ▲17.46% | Steady | 10,000,000 | 143.47% |
| 4 | Rio de Janeiro-Galeão International Airport | Rio de Janeiro | 12,337,944 | ▲4.3% | Steady | 18,000,000 | 68.54% |
| 5 | Santos Dumont Airport | Rio de Janeiro | 7,822,848 | ▲53.4% | ▲4 | 5,000,000 | 156.45% |
| 6 | Deputado Luís Eduardo Magalhães International Airport | Salvador | 7,696,307 | ▲9.13% | ▼1 | 6,000,000 | 128.27% |
| 7 | Tancredo Neves International Airport | Belo Horizonte | 7,261,064 | ▲29.26% | ▼1 | 5,000,000 | 145.22% |
| 8 | Salgado Filho International Airport | Porto Alegre | 6,676,216 | ▲19.1% | ▼1 | 4,000,000 | 166.9% |
| 9 | Guararapes-Gilberto Freyre International Airport | Recife | 5,958,982 | ▲13.49% | ▼1 | 9,000,000 | 66.21% |
| 10 | Afonso Pena International Airport | Curitiba | 5,774,615 | ▲18.97% | Steady | 6,000,000 | 96.16% |
| 11 | Viracopos International Airport | Campinas | 5,430,066 | ▲61.39% | ▲1 | 3,500,000 | 155.14% |
| 12 | Pinto Martins International Airport | Fortaleza | 5,072,721 | ▲20.44% | ▼1 | 3,000,000 | 169.09% |
| 13 | Eduardo Gomes International Airport | Manaus | 2,705,131 | ▲17.6% | ▲1 | 1,800,000 | 150.28% |
| 14 | Hercílio Luz International Airport | Florianópolis | 2,672,250 | ▲26.7% | ▲2 | 1,100,000 | 242.93% |
| 15 | Eurico de Aguiar Salles Airport | Vitória | 2,644,729 | ▲12.9% | ▼2 | 560,000 | 472.27% |
| 16 | Val de Cães International Airport | Belém | 2,570,899 | ▲16.7% | ▼1 | 2,700,000 | 95.21% |
| 17 | Augusto Severo International Airport | Natal | 2,413,416 | ▲27.4% | Steady | 1,500,000 | 160.89% |
| 18 | Santa Genoveva Airport | Goiânia | 2,348,648 | ▲32.5% | Steady | 600,000 | 391.44% |
| 19 | Marechal Rondon Airport | Cuiabá | 2,134,267 | ▲27.7% | Steady | 1,600,000 | 133.39% |
| 20 | Zumbi dos Palmares International Airport | Maceió | 1,431,781 | ▲28.15% | Steady | 1,200,000 | 119,31% |

== 2009 ==
=== Brazil's 15 busiest airports by passenger traffic ===
| Rank | Airport | Location | Total passengers | Annual change | Rank change | Capacity | Capacity in use |
|---|---|---|---|---|---|---|---|
| 1 | São Paulo-Guarulhos International Airport | São Paulo | 21,727,649 | ▲6.51% | Steady | 20,500,000 | 106.0% |
| 2 | Congonhas-São Paulo Airport | São Paulo | 13,699,657 | ▲0.20% | Steady | 12,000,000 | 114.2% |
| 3 | Brasília International Airport | Brasília | 12,213,825 | ▲16.95% | ▲1 | 10,000,000 | 122.1% |
| 4 | Rio de Janeiro-Galeão International Airport | Rio de Janeiro | 11,828,656 | ▲9.98% | ▼1 | 18,000,000 | 65.7% |
| 5 | Deputado Luís Eduardo Magalhães International Airport | Salvador | 7,052,720 | ▲16.72% | Steady | 6,000,000 | 117.5% |
| 6 | Tancredo Neves International Airport | Belo Horizonte | 5,617,171 | ▲8.24% | Steady | 5,000,000 | 112.3% |
| 7 | Salgado Filho International Airport | Porto Alegre | 5,607,703 | ▲13.71% | Steady | 4,000,000 | 140.1% |
| 8 | Guararapes-Gilberto Freyre International Airport | Recife | 5,250,565 | ▲12.20% | Steady | 9,000,000 | 58.3% |
| 9 | Santos Dumont Airport | Rio de Janeiro | 5,099,643 | ▲40.53% | ▲1 | 3,200,000 | 159.4% |
| 10 | Afonso Pena International Airport | Curitiba | 4,853,733 | ▲13.37% | ▼1 | 6,000,000 | 80.8% |
| 11 | Pinto Martins International Airport | Fortaleza | 4,211,651 | ▲21.51% | Steady | 3,000,000 | 140.3% |
| 12 | Viracopos International Airport | Campinas | 3,364,404 | ▲210.40% | ▲7 | 3,500,000 | 96.1% |
| 13 | Eurico de Aguiar Salles Airport | Vitória | 2,342,283 | ▲17.79% | ▲2 | 560,000 | 418.3% |
| 14 | Eduardo Gomes International Airport | Manaus | 2,300,022 | ▲13.77% | Steady | 2,500,000 | 92.0% |
| 15 | Val de Cães International Airport | Belém | 2,203,653 | ▲2.33% | ▼3 | 2,700,000 | 81.6% |

== 2008 ==
=== Brazil's 15 busiest airports by passenger traffic ===
| Rank | Airport | Location | Total passengers | Annual change | Rank change | Capacity in use |
|---|---|---|---|---|---|---|
| 1 | São Paulo-Guarulhos International Airport | São Paulo | 20,400,304 | ▲8.5% | Steady | 123.6% |
| 2 | Congonhas-São Paulo Airport | São Paulo | 13,672,301 | ▼10.4% | Steady | 113.9% |
| 3 | Rio de Janeiro-Galeão International Airport | Rio de Janeiro | 10,717,120 | ▲3.5% | ▲1 | 71.4% |
| 4 | Brasília International Airport | Brasília | 10,443,393 | ▼6.1% | ▼1 | 141.1% |
| 5 | Deputado Luís Eduardo Magalhães International Airport | Salvador | 6,042,307 | ▲1.6% | Steady | 100.7% |
| 6 | Tancredo Neves International Airport | Belo Horizonte | 5,189,528 | ▲19.6% | ▲1 | 103.8% |
| 7 | Salgado Filho International Airport | Porto Alegre | 4,931,464 | ▲10.9% | ▼1 | 80.8% |
| 8 | Guararapes-Gilberto Freyre International Airport | Recife | 4,679,457 | ▲11.7% | Steady | 93.6% |
| 9 | Afonso Pena International Airport | Curitiba | 4,281,354 | ▲9.6% | Steady | 122.3% |
| 10 | Santos Dumont Airport | Rio de Janeiro | 3,628,766 | ▲12.9% | ▲1 | 42.7% |
| 11 | Pinto Martins International Airport | Fortaleza | 3,465,791 | ▼4.1% | ▼1 | 115.5% |
| 12 | Val de Cães International Airport | Belém | 2,153,508 | ▲1.6% | Steady | 79.8% |
| 13 | Hercílio Luz International Airport | Florianópolis | 2,080,342 | ▲6.8% | ▲1 | 189.1% |
| 14 | Eduardo Gomes International Airport | Manaus | 2,021,668 | ▼2.0% | ▼1 | 113.4% |
| 15 | Eurico de Aguiar Salles Airport | Vitória | 1,988,447 | ▲5.0% | Steady | 355.1% |

== 2007 ==
=== Brazil's 15 busiest airports by passenger traffic ===
| Rank | Airport | Location | Total passengers | Annual change | Rank change | Capacity in use |
|---|---|---|---|---|---|---|
| 1 | São Paulo-Guarulhos International Airport | São Paulo | 18,795,596 | ▲19.3% | ▲1 | 113.9% |
| 2 | Congonhas-São Paulo Airport | São Paulo | 15,265,433 | ▼17.3% | ▼1 | 127.2% |
| 3 | Brasília International Airport | Brasília | 11,119,872 | ▲15.0% | Steady | 150.3% |
| 4 | Rio de Janeiro-Galeão International Airport | Rio de Janeiro | 10,352,616 | ▲16.9% | Steady | 69.0% |
| 5 | Deputado Luís Eduardo Magalhães International Airport | Salvador | 5,932,461 | ▲9.3% | Steady | 98.9% |
| 6 | Salgado Filho International Airport | Porto Alegre | 4,444,748 | ▲15.6% | ▲1 | 72.9% |
| 7 | Tancredo Neves International Airport | Belo Horizonte | 4,340,129 | ▲16.4% | ▲1 | 86.8% |
| 8 | Guararapes-Gilberto Freyre International Airport | Recife | 4,188,081 | ▲5.9% | ▼2 | 83.8% |
| 9 | Afonso Pena International Airport | Curitiba | 3,907,275 | ▲10.6% | ▲1 | 111.6% |
| 10 | Pinto Martins International Airport | Fortaleza | 3,614,439 | ▲10.1% | ▲1 | 120.5% |
| 11 | Santos Dumont Airport | Rio de Janeiro | 3,214,415 | ▼9.5% | ▼2 | 100.5% |
| 12 | Val de Cães International Airport | Belém | 2,119,552 | ▲19.3% | Steady | 78.5% |
| 13 | Eduardo Gomes International Airport | Manaus | 2,080,342 | ▲23.1% | Steady | 114.6% |
| 14 | Hercílio Luz International Airport | Florianópolis | 1,948,010 | ▲19.5% | ▲1 | 177.1% |
| 15 | Eurico de Aguiar Salles Airport | Vitória | 1,894,540 | ▲14.0% | ▼1 | 336.3% |

== 2006 ==
=== Brazil's 15 busiest airports by passenger traffic ===
| Rank | Airport | Location | Total passengers | Annual change | Rank change | Capacity in use |
|---|---|---|---|---|---|---|
| 1 | Congonhas-São Paulo Airport | São Paulo | 18,459,191 | ▲7.6% | Steady | 153.8% |
| 2 | São Paulo-Guarulhos International Airport | São Paulo | 15,759,181 | ▼0.5% | Steady | 95.5% |
| 3 | Brasília International Airport | Brasília | 9,699,911 | ▲2.9% | Steady | 131.1% |
| 4 | Rio de Janeiro-Galeão International Airport | Rio de Janeiro | 8,856,527 | ▲2.3% | Steady | 59.0% |
| 5 | Deputado Luís Eduardo Magalhães International Airport | Salvador | 5,425,747 | ▲19.1% | Steady | 90.9% |
| 6 | Guararapes-Gilberto Freyre International Airport | Recife | 3,953,845 | ▲9.7% | Steady | 79.1% |
| 7 | Salgado Filho International Airport | Porto Alegre | 3,846,508 | ▲9.2% | ▲1 | 63.1% |
| 8 | Tancredo Neves International Airport | Belo Horizonte | 3,727,501 | ▲28.8% | ▲2 | 74.6% |
| 9 | Santos Dumont Airport | Rio de Janeiro | 3,533,177 | ▼0.8% | ▼2 | 110.4% |
| 10 | Afonso Pena International Airport | Curitiba | 3,532,879 | ▲4.1% | ▼1 | 100.9% |
| 11 | Pinto Martins International Airport | Fortaleza | 3,282,979 | ▲18.3% | Steady | 109.4% |
| 12 | Val de Cães International Airport | Belém | 1,776,008 | ▲16.6% | ▲1 | 65.8% |
| 13 | Eduardo Gomes International Airport | Manaus | 1,689,817 | ▲12.1% | ▲2 | 93.1% |
| 14 | Eurico de Aguiar Salles Airport | Vitória | 1,661,192 | ▲9.5% | Steady | 296.6% |
| 15 | Hercílio Luz International Airport | Florianópolis | 1,630,141 | ▲5.2% | ▼3 | 148.2% |

== 2005 ==
=== Brazil's 15 busiest airports by passenger traffic ===
| Rank | Airport | Location | Total passengers | Annual change | Rank change | Capacity in use |
|---|---|---|---|---|---|---|
| 1 | Congonhas-São Paulo Airport | São Paulo | 17,147,628 | ▲26.0% | Steady | 142.9% |
| 2 | São Paulo-Guarulhos International Airport | São Paulo | 15,834,797 | ▲22.4% | Steady | 96.0% |
| 3 | Brasília International Airport | Brasília | 9,426,569 | ▼5.0% | Steady | 127.4% |
| 4 | Rio de Janeiro-Galeão International Airport | Rio de Janeiro | 8,657,139 | ▲43.7% | Steady | 57.7% |
| 5 | Deputado Luís Eduardo Magalhães International Airport | Salvador | 4,554,572 | ▲9.9% | ▲1 | 75.9% |
| 6 | Guararapes-Gilberto Freyre International Airport | Recife | 3,604,652 | ▲13.6% | ▲3 | 72.1% |
| 7 | Santos Dumont Airport | Rio de Janeiro | 3,562,297 | ▼27.1% | ▼2 | 111.3% |
| 8 | Salgado Filho International Airport | Porto Alegre | 3,521,204 | ▲9.5% | ▼1 | 57.7% |
| 9 | Afonso Pena International Airport | Curitiba | 3,393,079 | ▲19.5% | ▼1 | 96.9% |
| 10 | Tancredo Neves International Airport | Belo Horizonte | 2,893,299 | ▲644.6% | ▲15 | 57.9% |
| 11 | Pinto Martins International Airport | Fortaleza | 2,774,240 | ▲19.7% | Steady | 92.5% |
| 12 | Hercílio Luz International Airport | Florianópolis | 1,548,833 | ▲12.0% | Steady | 140.8% |
| 13 | Val de Cães International Airport | Belém | 1,523,714 | ▲14.5% | ▲1 | 56.4% |
| 14 | Eurico de Aguiar Salles Airport | Vitória | 1,517,578 | ▲21.8% | ▲1 | 271.0% |
| 15 | Eduardo Gomes International Airport | Manaus | 1,508,022 | ▲10.2% | ▼2 | 83.1% |

== 2004 ==
=== Brazil's 15 busiest airports by passenger traffic ===
| Rank | Airport | Location | Total passengers | Annual change | Rank change | Capacity in use |
|---|---|---|---|---|---|---|
| 1 | Congonhas-São Paulo Airport | São Paulo | 13,611,227 | ▲12.8% | Steady | 113.4% |
| 2 | São Paulo-Guarulhos International Airport | São Paulo | 12,940,193 | ▲11.7% | Steady | 78.4% |
| 3 | Brasília International Airport | Brasília | 9,926,786 | ▲45.1% | Steady | 134.1% |
| 4 | Rio de Janeiro-Galeão International Airport | Rio de Janeiro | 6,024,930 | ▲30.4% | ▲1 | 40.2% |
| 5 | Santos Dumont Airport | Rio de Janeiro | 4,887,306 | ▼9.2% | ▼1 | 152.7% |
| 6 | Deputado Luís Eduardo Magalhães International Airport | Salvador | 4,145,371 | ▲20.0% | Steady | 69.1% |
| 7 | Salgado Filho International Airport | Porto Alegre | 3,215,545 | ▲11.6% | ▲1 | 52.7% |
| 8 | Pampulha Regional Airport | Belo Horizonte | 3,194,715 | ▲7.5% | ▼1 | 213.0% |
| 9 | Guararapes-Gilberto Freyre International Airport | Recife | 3,173,672 | ▲16.1% | Steady | 63.5% |
| 10 | Afonso Pena International Airport | Curitiba | 2,840,349 | ▲13.0% | Steady | 81.2% |
| 11 | Pinto Martins International Airport | Fortaleza | 2,317,869 | ▲24.0% | Steady | 77.3% |
| 12 | Hercílio Luz International Airport | Florianópolis | 1,382,577 | ▲7.8% | Steady | 125.7% |
| 13 | Eduardo Gomes International Airport | Manaus | 1,368,968 | ▲10.3% | Steady | 75.4% |
| 14 | Val de Cães International Airport | Belém | 1,330,965 | ▲13.5% | ▲1 | 49.3% |
| 15 | Eurico de Aguiar Salles Airport | Vitória | 1,246,222 | ▲6.1% | ▼1 | 222.5% |

== See also ==
- Infraero
- DAESP
