= NVT =

NVT may refer to:

== Science and technology ==
- NVT ensemble (or canonical ensemble), in statistical thermodynamics
- Network virtual terminal, in the Telnet computer protocol
- Neutrons, velocity, time (n.v.t. or cm^{−2}), a unit of neutron fluence

== Other uses ==
- Navegantes Airport, Brazil (opened 1959; IATA:NVT)
- Nguyễn Văn Thiệu (1923–2001), South Vietnamese general and politician
- Norton Villiers Triumph, a British motorcycle manufacturer (1973–1978)

== See also ==
- MVT (disambiguation)
- NVD (disambiguation)
