= JDO =

JDO may refer to:

- Java Data Objects
- Jewish Defense Organization
- the IATA code for Juazeiro do Norte Airport
- A Joint Duty Officer within the Koreas’ Joint Security Area
