= NVD =

NVD may refer to:

== Businesses and organisations ==
- Avion Express, a Lithuanian airline (formed 2005; ICAO:NVD)
- Dutch Zoo Federation (formed 1966; Dutch: Nederlandse Vereniging van Dierentuinen)
- Party for Neighbourly Love, Freedom and Diversity, a Dutch pro-paedophilia political party (2006–2022; Dutch: Partij voor Naastenliefde, Vrijheid en Diversiteit)

== Science and technology ==
- HD NVD, a video disc standard
- National Vulnerability Database, in computer security
- Night vision device, in weaponry and optics
- Normal vaginal delivery, in medicine

== See also ==
- Nvdes, American experimental musician
- MVD (disambiguation)
- NVT (disambiguation)
