= SBPS =

SBPS may refer to:

- the ICAO airport code for Porto Seguro Airport
- Special boiling point spirit
