= Rodrigo Mathiola =

Brazilian footballer

Personal information
- Full name: Rodrigo Antônio Mathiola
- Date of birth: 14 August 1997 (age 29)
- Place of birth: Navegantes, Brazil
- Height: 1.78 m (5 ft 10 in)
- Position: Attacking midfielder

Team information
- Current team: Beira-Mar

Youth career
- 2015–2017: Cruzeiro

Senior career*
Years	Team	Apps	(Gls)
2017–2019	Barra	19	(2)
2018	→ Foz do Iguaçu (loan)	7	(0)
2019–2023	Vitória FC	25	(4)
2023–2025	Anadia	24	(3)
2025–	Beira-Mar	5	(0)
- * Club domestic league appearances and goals as of 25 June 2025

Rodrigo Antônio Mathiola (born 14 August 1997) is a Brazilian professional footballer who plays as an attacking midfielder for Beira-Mar.

== Career ==
Mathiola made his professional debut with Vitória FC in a 0–0 Primeira Liga tie with on 23 August 2019.

On 25 July 2023, Vitória announced that Mathiola's contract had been terminated by mutual consent.

On 2 August 2023, Mathiola signed for Liga 3 side Anadia.
