= MVT =

MVT may refer to:

== Science and technology ==
- Mapnik Vector Tile, vector tile format
- The Marchetti MVT, an Italian fighter aircraft of 1919
- Marginal value theorem, a behavioral ecology theorem
- Mechanical Vapor Transfer, a desalination technology by distillation
- Mean value theorem, a mathematical theorem
- Minimum Viable Technology, agile principles applied to engineering/technology teams
- Multiprogramming with a variable number of tasks, an option of mainframe computer operating system

== Other uses ==
- Maldives time, UTC+05:00
- Marrakesh VIP Treaty
- Mississippi Valley-Type carbonate hosted lead-zinc ore deposits
- Mount Vernon Terminal Railway
- Mount Vernon Trail
- Multivariate testing (disambiguation)
- Music Venue Trust

Mvt, mvt, or MVT may refer to:

- Movement (music), a large division of a larger composition or musical notes
