= Presidente Castro Pinto International Airport =

Airport in Brazil

João Pessoa–Presidente Castro Pinto International Airport Aeroporto Internacional de João Pessoa–Presidente Castro Pinto

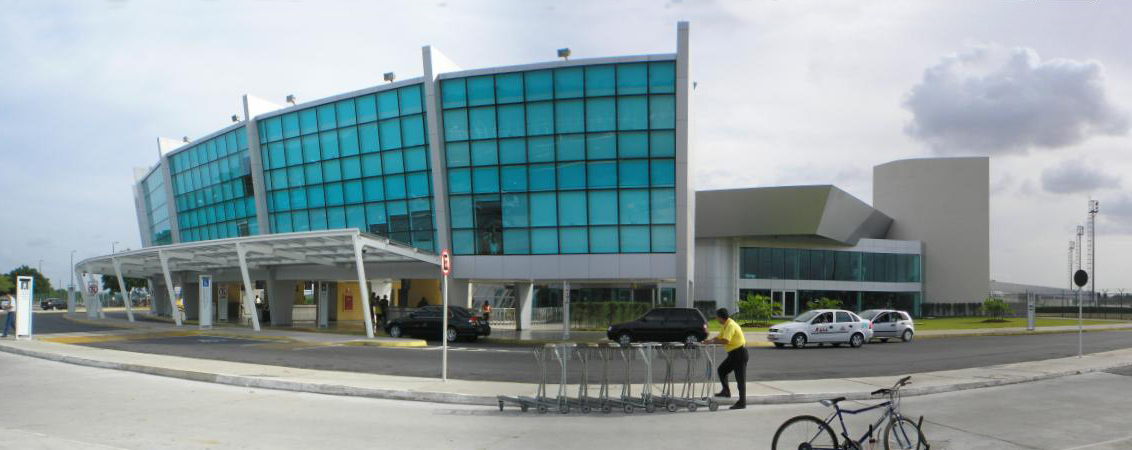
- IATA: JPA; ICAO: SBJP; LID: PB0001

Summary
- Airport type: Public
- Operator: Infraero (1979–2019); AENA (2019–present)
- Serves: João Pessoa
- Location: Santa Rita, Brazil
- Opened: 20 August 1957; 69 years ago
- Time zone: BRT (UTC−03:00)
- Elevation AMSL: 66 m (217 ft)
- Coordinates: 07°08′54″S 034°57′01″W
- Website: www.aenabrasil.com.br/pt/aeroportos/aeroporto-internacional-de-joao-pessoa-presidente-castro-pinto/index.html

Map
- Location in Brazil

Runways
Direction	Length		Surface
Direction	m	ft	Surface
16/24	2,515	8,251	Asphalt

Statistics (2025)
- Passengers: 1,890,382 ▲18%
- Aircraft Operations: 16,554 ▲6%
- Metric tonnes of cargo: 7,460 ▲103%
- Statistics: AENA; Sources: Airport Website, ANAC, DECEA

João Pessoa–Presidente Castro Pinto International Airport (IATA: JPA, ICAO: SBJP) is the international airport serving João Pessoa, located in the municipality of Santa Rita, in the state of Paraíba in Brazil. Since August 2, 1960 the airport is named after João Pereira de Castro Pinto (1863-1944), a lawyer, writer and President of the State of Paraíba (at the time State Governors had the title of President) from 1912 to 1915.

It is operated by AENA.

== History ==
The airport was officially opened on August 20, 1957. Between February 1, 1979 and March 14, 2019 it was administrated by Infraero.

Between 1980 and 1981 Infraero conducted major renovations and enlargements of the runway, taxiways and apron and in 1983 a cargo terminal was opened. In 1985 the new passenger terminal was opened and in 1995 it underwent renovations and enlargements.

Previously operated by Infraero, on March 15, 2019 AENA won a 30-year concession to operate the airport.

== Airlines and destinations ==
Airlines	Destinations
Azul Brazilian Airlines	Belo Horizonte–Confins, Campinas, Recife, São Paulo–Congonhas; Seasonal: Goiânia, Ribeirão Preto, São José do Rio Preto, Uberlândia
Gol Linhas Aéreas	Brasília, Buenos Aires–Ezeiza, Rio de Janeiro–Galeão, Salvador da Bahia, São Paulo–Congonhas, São Paulo–Guarulhos
LATAM Brasil	Brasília, São Paulo–Congonhas, São Paulo–Guarulhos; Seasonal: Rio de Janeiro–Galeão

== Statistics ==
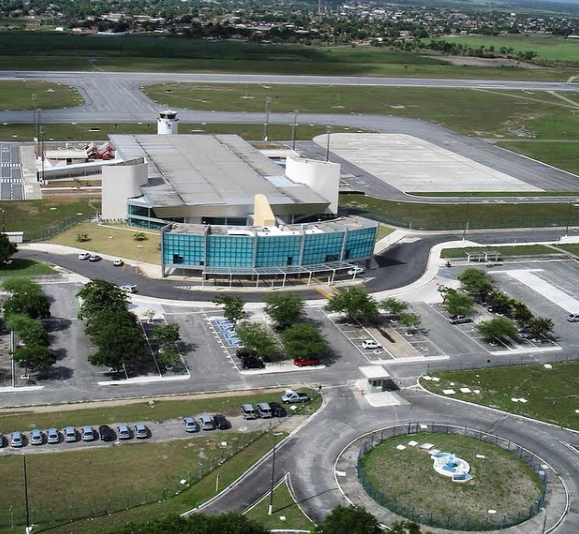
Terminal in 2020

Following are the numbers of passenger, aircraft and cargo movements at the airport, according to Infraero (2007–2019) and AENA (2020–2025) reports:

Year	Passengers	Aircraft	Cargo (t)
2025	1,890,382 ▲18%	16,554 ▲6%	7,460 ▲103%
2024	1,605,805 ▲12%	15,584 ▲17%	3,673 ▲30%
2023	1,431,433 ▲16%	13,302 ▲12%	2,819 ▼3%
2022	1,231,689 ▲19%	11,897 ▲2%	2,897 ▲8%
2021	1,032,908 ▲36%	11,636 ▲40%	2,683 ▲38%
2020	756,992 ▼43%	8,332 ▼35%	1,944 ▼59%
2019	1,336,872 ▼6%	12,797 ▼11	4,695 ▲7%
2018	1,414,896 ▲2%	14,363 ▲7%	4,378 ▲73%
2017	1,387,496 ▼2%	13,373 ▼3%	2,534 ▼14%
2016	1,418,380 ▼3%	13,855 ▼5%	2,930 ▼3%
2015	1,463,315 ▲10%	14,635 ▲10%	3,014 ▲17%
2014	1,327,284 ▲8%	13,292 ▲5%	2,571 ▼16%
2013	1,230,230 ▼2%	12,623 ▼2%	3,044 ▼25%
2012	1,252,559 ▲10%	12,883 ▼3%	4,033 ▲29%
2011	1,142,183 ▲23%	13,332 ▲24%	3,115 ▲29%
2010	926,043 ▲55%	10,743 ▲37%	2,412 ▲25%
2009	598,015 ▲33%	7,831 ▲8%	1,924 ▼1%
2008	448,444 ▼10%	7,277 ▼9%	1,950 ▲19%
2007	500,547	7,976	1,645

== Access ==
The airport is located 12 km (7 mi) from downtown João Pessoa.

== See also ==
- List of airports in Brazil
