= Londrina Airport =

Airport serving Londrina in state of Paraná, Brazil

Londrina–Governador José Richa Airport Aeroporto de Londrina–Governador José Richa

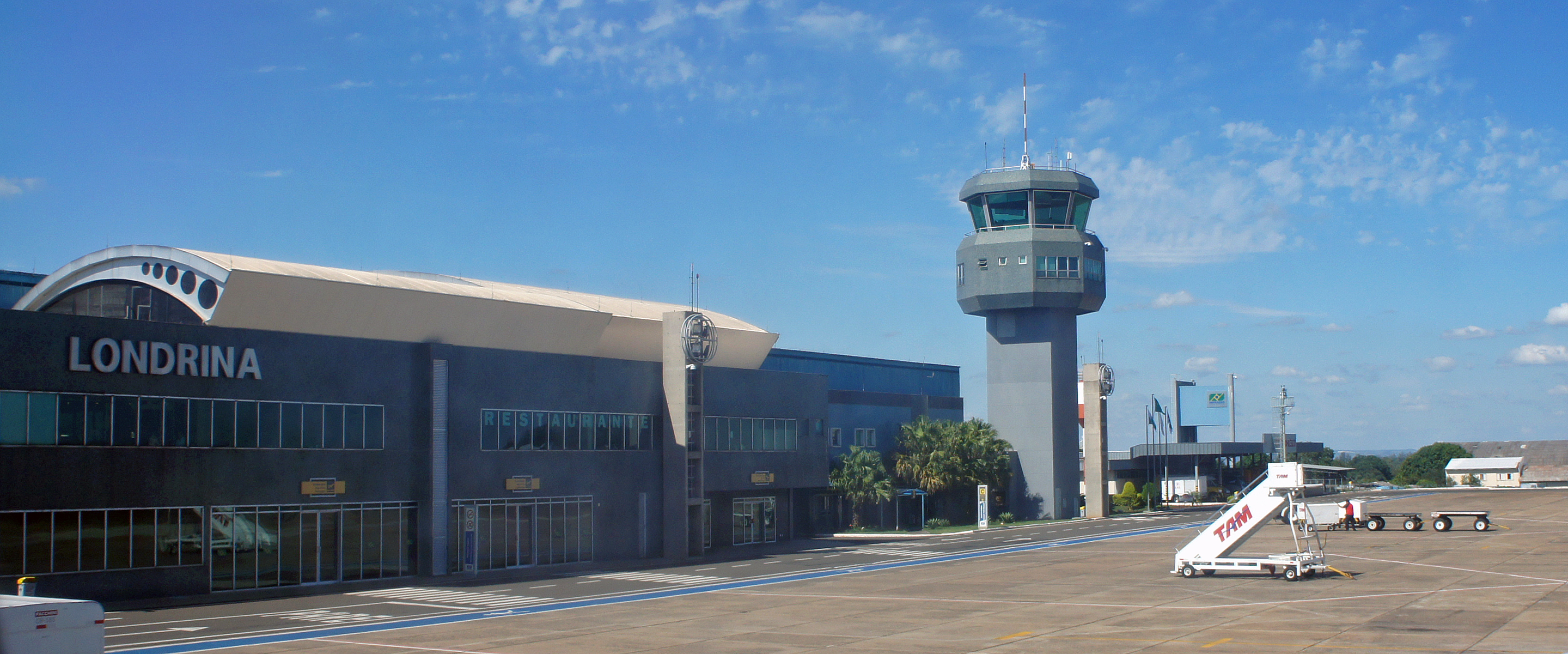
- IATA: LDB; ICAO: SBLO; LID: PR0003

Summary
- Airport type: Public
- Operator: Infraero (1980–2021); Motiva (2021–2026); ASUR (2026–present)
- Serves: Londrina
- Opened: 1936
- Time zone: BRT (UTC−03:00)
- Elevation AMSL: 569 m (1,867 ft)
- Coordinates: 23°19′49″S 051°08′12″W
- Website: aeroportos.motiva.com.br/londrina-pr/

Map
- Location in Brazil LDB (Brazil)

Runways
Direction	Length		Surface
Direction	m	ft	Surface
13/31	2,100	6,890	Asphalt

Statistics (2025)
- Passengers: 697,385 ▼3%
- Aircraft operations: 7,404 ▼55%
- Statistics: Motiva; Sources: Airport Website, ANAC, DECEA

Londrina–Gov. José Richa Airport (IATA: LDB, ICAO: SBLO) is the airport serving Londrina, Brazil. It is named after José Richa (1934–2003), former mayor of Londrina and governor of Paraná.

It is operated by ASUR.

== History ==
The airport was commissioned in 1936, though the runway was unpaved until 1956. In 1958 a new terminal, a project by Remo Veronesi, was opened, and in 2000 it was extensively renovated and enlarged.

Previously operated by Infraero, on April 7, 2021, CCR won a 30-year concession to operate the airport. On April 26, 2025 CCR was rebranded as Motiva.

On November 18, 2025 the entire airports portfolio of Motiva was sold to the Mexican airport operator ASUR. Motiva will cease to operate airports. The transaction was completed on August 31, 2026.

== Airlines and destinations ==
Airlines	Destinations
Azul Brazilian Airlines	Campinas, Curitiba; Seasonal: Porto Seguro
Gol Linhas Aéreas	São Paulo–Congonhas
LATAM Airlines	Curitiba (begins 8 March 2027), São Paulo–Congonhas, São Paulo–Guarulhos

== Accidents and incidents ==
- 13 December 1950: a VASP Douglas C-47A-90-DL registration PP-SPT while on initial climb from Londrina lost engine power, crashed and caught fire. There were 3 ground fatalities.
- 14 September 1969: a VASP Douglas C-47B-45-DK registration PP-SPP operating flight 555 took off from Londrina to São Paulo-Congonhas but due to a feathered propeller, had to return to the origin. While on approach for landing, the aircraft made a sharp left turn and crashed. All 20 passengers and crew died.

== Access ==
The airport is located 2 km (1 mi) southeast from downtown Londrina.

== See also ==
- List of airports in Brazil
