= MVD (disambiguation) =

MVD refers to the Ministry of Internal Affairs of the Russian Federation (Russian: Министерство внутренних дел [МВД], Ministerstvo vnutrennikh del).

MVD may also refer to:

== Medicine ==
- Mitral valve disease, also known as mitral regurgitation or mitral insufficiency
- Marburg virus disease, a disease of humans and other primates caused by marburgviruses
- Microvascular decompression, an operation to relieve the pain caused by trigeminal neuralgia

== Organizations ==
- HC MVD, a Kontinental Hockey League ice hockey team, based Balashikha
- Mississippi Valley Division, a regional command of the U.S. Army Corps of Engineers
- Carrasco International Airport (IATA: MVD), Uruguay's largest airport
- Motor Vehicles Department, an agency under Government of Kerala, responsible motor vehicles law enforcement.
- Motor Vehicle Division, the equivalent of the Department of Motor Vehicles in Arizona and New Mexico, United States
- Ministry of Internal Affairs (Soviet Union), Soviet predecessor to the Russian MVD

== Other uses ==
- MVD Entertainment Group (previously Music Video Distributors, Inc.), a company that releases and distributes music and entertainment
- Most Valuable Danette, an annual award presented on The Dan Patrick Show
- Multivalued dependency, in database theory, a full constraint between two sets of attributes in a relation
