= Greater Natal International Airport =

Commercial airport serving Natal, Rio Grande do Norte, Brazil

Rio Grande do Norte/São Gonçalo do Amarante–Governador Aluízio Alves International Airport Aeroporto Internacional do Rio Grande do Norte/São Gonçalo do Amarante–Governador Aluízio Alves
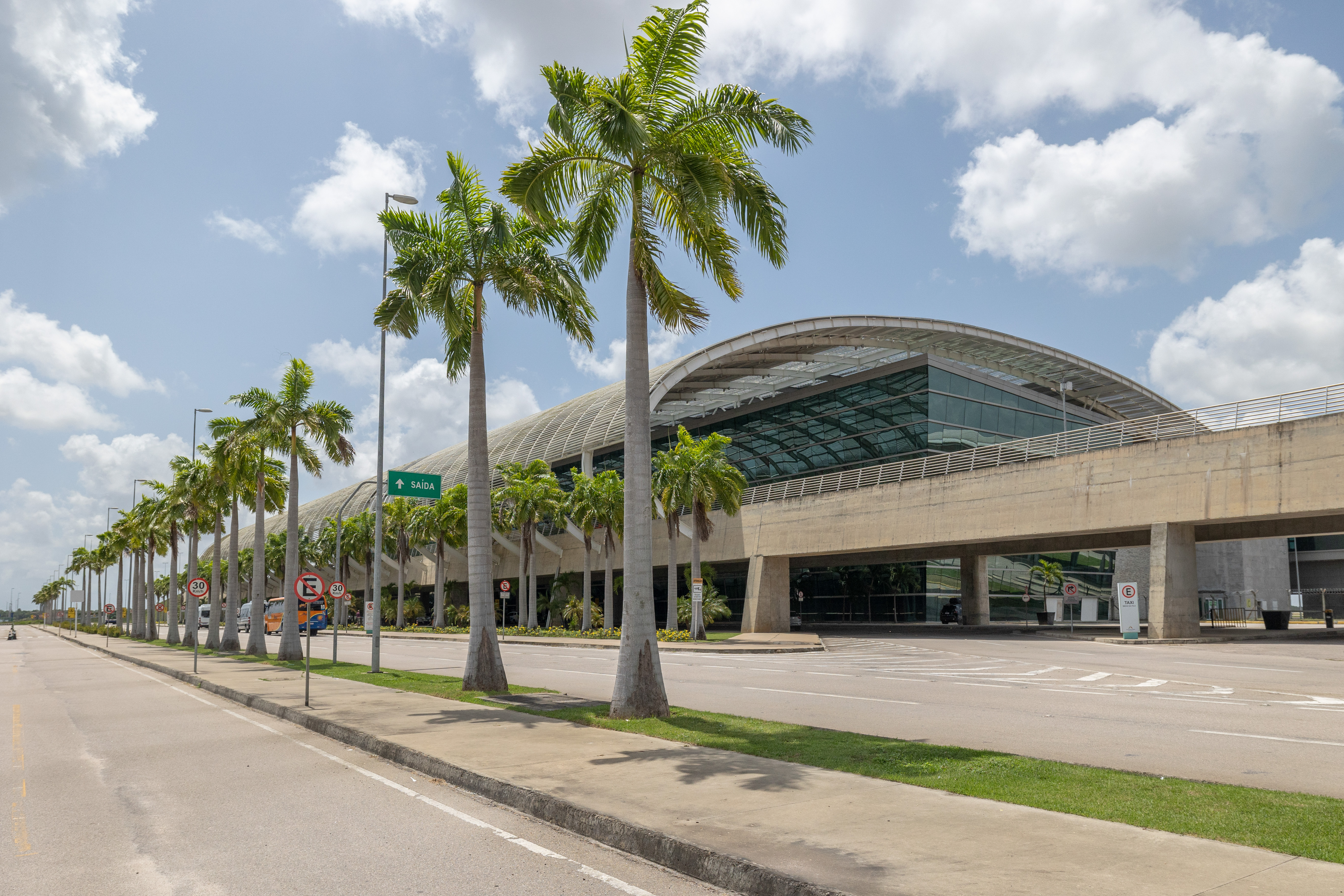
- Landside terminal building in 2022
- IATA: NAT; ICAO: SBSG; LID: RN0001

Summary
- Airport type: Public
- Operator: Inframérica (2011–2023); Zurich Airport Brasil (2023–present)
- Serves: Natal
- Location: São Gonçalo do Amarante, Brazil
- Opened: 9 June 2014; 12 years ago
- Time zone: BRT (UTC−03:00)
- Elevation AMSL: 83 m (272 ft)
- Coordinates: 05°46′08″S 035°21′59″W
- Website: natal-airport.com

Map
- Location in Brazil

Runways
Direction	Length		Surface
Direction	m	ft	Surface
12/30	3,000	9,842	Asphalt

Statistics (2025)
- Passengers: 2,421,540
- Aircraft operations: 17,675
- Statistics: Zurich Airport Brasil; Sources: Airport Website, ANAC, DECEA

Rio Grande do Norte/São Gonçalo do Amarante–Governador Aluízio Alves International Airport (IATA: NAT, ICAO: SBSG) is an international airport serving Natal, located in the municipality of São Gonçalo do Amarante, in the state of Rio Grande do Norte.

The airport is operated by Zurich Airport Brasil.

== History ==
The airport was built to replace Augusto Severo International Airport. In 1998, Infraero started the planning and construction of the airport. In 2011 the concession of the unfinished facility was auctioned and the winner would have to finish its construction, including the terminal building and control tower. The project envisaged an intermodal airport, focusing both on passenger and cargo transportation. The complex was expected to have the highest aircraft traffic in the North East of Brazil.

On May 12, 2011, the National Civil Aviation Agency of Brazil (ANAC) released a document opening the concession of the unfinished airport to private entrepreneurs. The auction to choose the winner took place on August 22, 2011, and the winner was Consortium Inframérica, which is formed by the Brazilian Engineering Group Engevix (50%) and the Argentinean Group Corporación América (50%). The latter operates 52 airports in seven countries. In 2013, it was decreed that the name of the airport would be inspired in part from former governor of the state of Rio Grande do Norte Aluízio Alves.

Consortium Inframérica was given three years to build the passenger and cargo terminals, and was authorized to commercially exploit the facility for 25 years. Differently from other Brazilian airports in the process of privatization, in which the state operator Infraero retained 49% of the shares, in the case of Natal Consortium Inframérica got 100% of the shares and Infraero held no participation. The airport is the first in Brazil operated by a private sector company.

The airport started operations on May 31, 2014 with domestic flights. International operations followed a few days later. The facility was officially opened on June 9, 2014.

On March 10, 2021, it was announced that the National Civil Aviation Agency of Brazil had approved a new concession process for the airport, as per request from Consortium Inframérica made on March 5, 2020. On May 19, 2023, Zurich Airport Brasil won a 30-year concession to operate the airport.

== Airlines and destinations ==
=== Passenger ===
Airlines	Destinations
Azul Brazilian Airlines	Belo Horizonte–Confins, Campinas, Recife, São Paulo–Congonhas; Seasonal: Goiânia, Presidente Prudente, Ribeirão Preto, São José do Rio Preto, Uberlândia
Gol Linhas Aéreas	Brasília, Buenos Aires–Aeroparque (ends 30 January 2027), Rio de Janeiro–Galeão, Salvador da Bahia, São Paulo–Congonhas, São Paulo–Guarulhos; Seasonal: Montevideo
JetSmart Argentina	Buenos Aires–Aeroparque, Buenos Aires–Ezeiza
LATAM Brasil	Brasília, Fortaleza, São Paulo–Congonhas, São Paulo–Guarulhos; Seasonal: Buenos Aires–Ezeiza (begins 15 December 2026); Seasonal charter: Rosario (begins 3 January 2027)
TAP Air Portugal	Lisbon

== Statistics ==
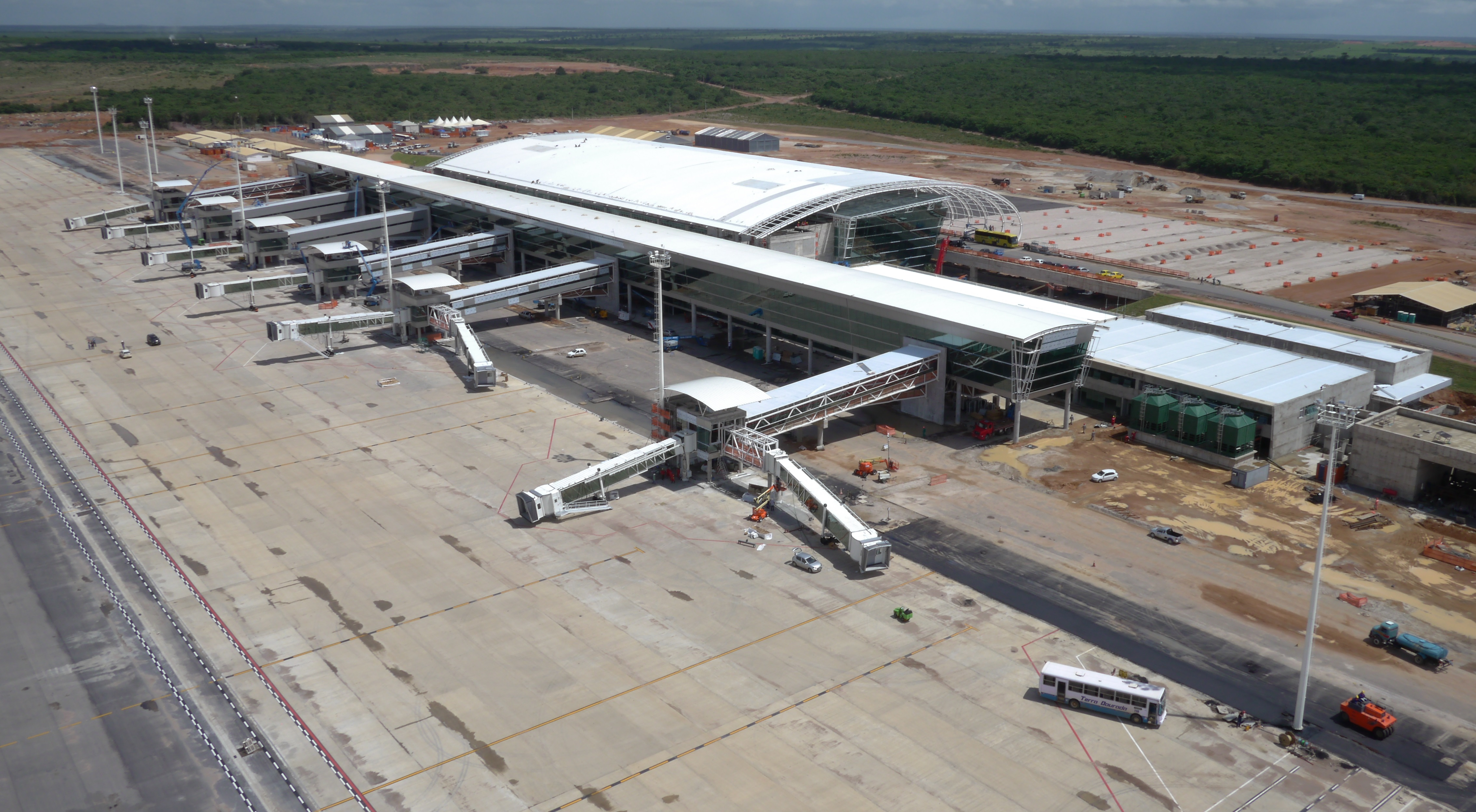
Airport still under construction in 2014

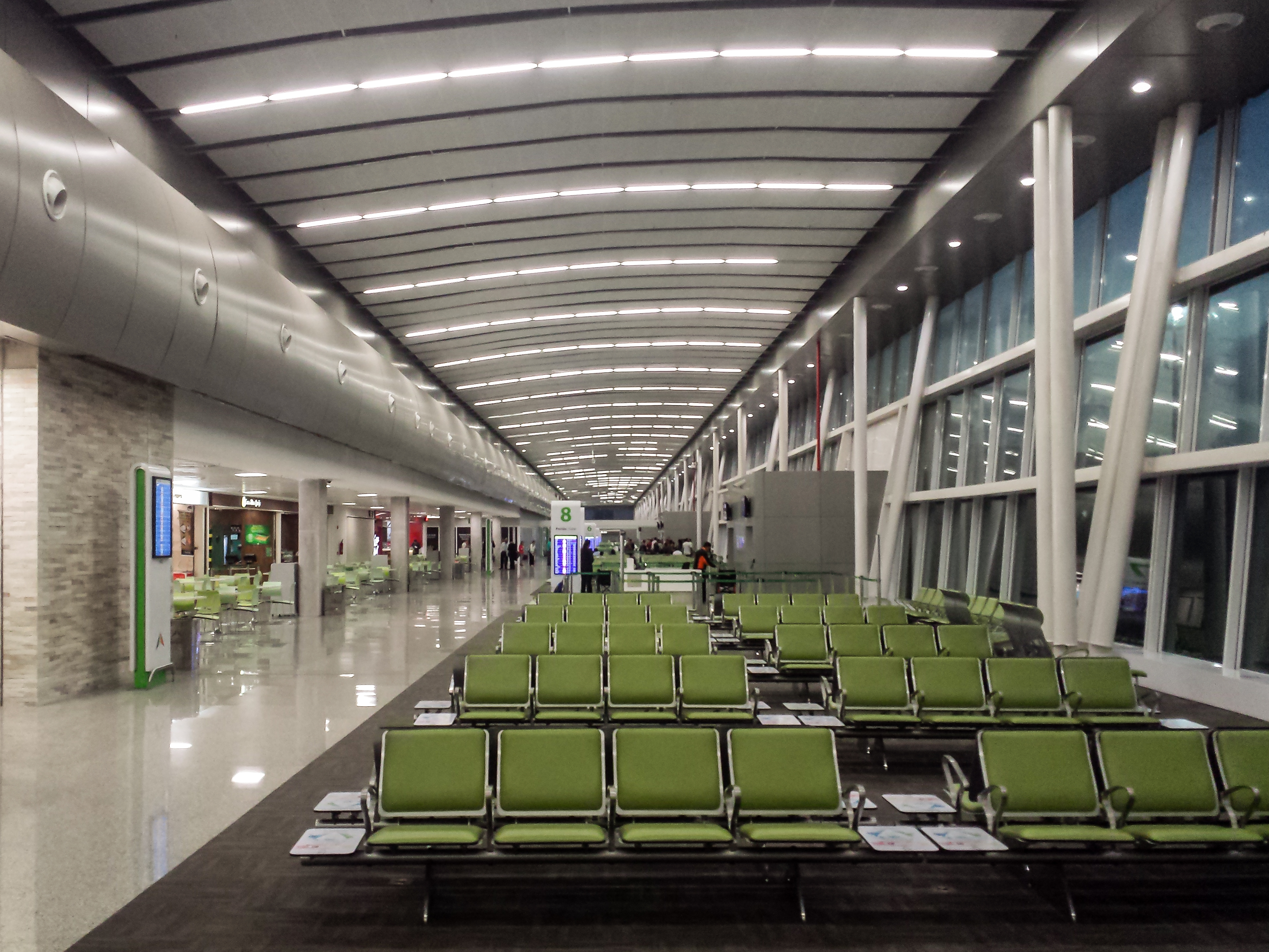
Transit hall in 2015

Following are the number of passenger, aircraft and cargo movements at the airport, according to Inframérica (2014-2022) and Zurich Airport Brasil (2024-2025) reports:

Year	Passenger	Aircraft	Cargo (t)
2025	2,421,540	17,675	
2024^{c}	2,030,084	16,967	
2023^{b}			
2022	2,064,595 ▲14%	16,545 ▲11%	5,065 ▲16%
2021	1,816,362 ▲53%	14,846 ▲51%	4,382 ▼22%
2020	1,185,208 ▼49%	9,852 ▼45%	5,636 ▼57%
2019	2,330,725 ▼4%	17,854 ▼5%	12,981 ▼16%
2018	2,429,389 ▲1%	18,812	15,420 ▲24%
2017	2,403,135 ▲4%	18,835 ▲2%	12,389 ▲3%
2016	2,316,349 ▼10%	18,553 ▼18%	12,077 ▲11%
2015	2,584,355	22,625	10,896
2014^{a}	1,495,724	14,256	4,608

Note:
^{a}: As of May 31, 2014, the day operations started.
^{b}: Neither Inframérica or Zurich Airport Brasil have informed statistics for 2023.
^{c}: Starting at mid-February 2024.

== Access ==
The airport is located 25 km (16 mi) from downtown Natal.

== See also ==
- List of airports in Brazil
