= Ilhéus Jorge Amado Airport =

Ilhéus/Bahia–Jorge Amado Airport Aeroporto de Ilhéus/Bahia–Jorge Amado
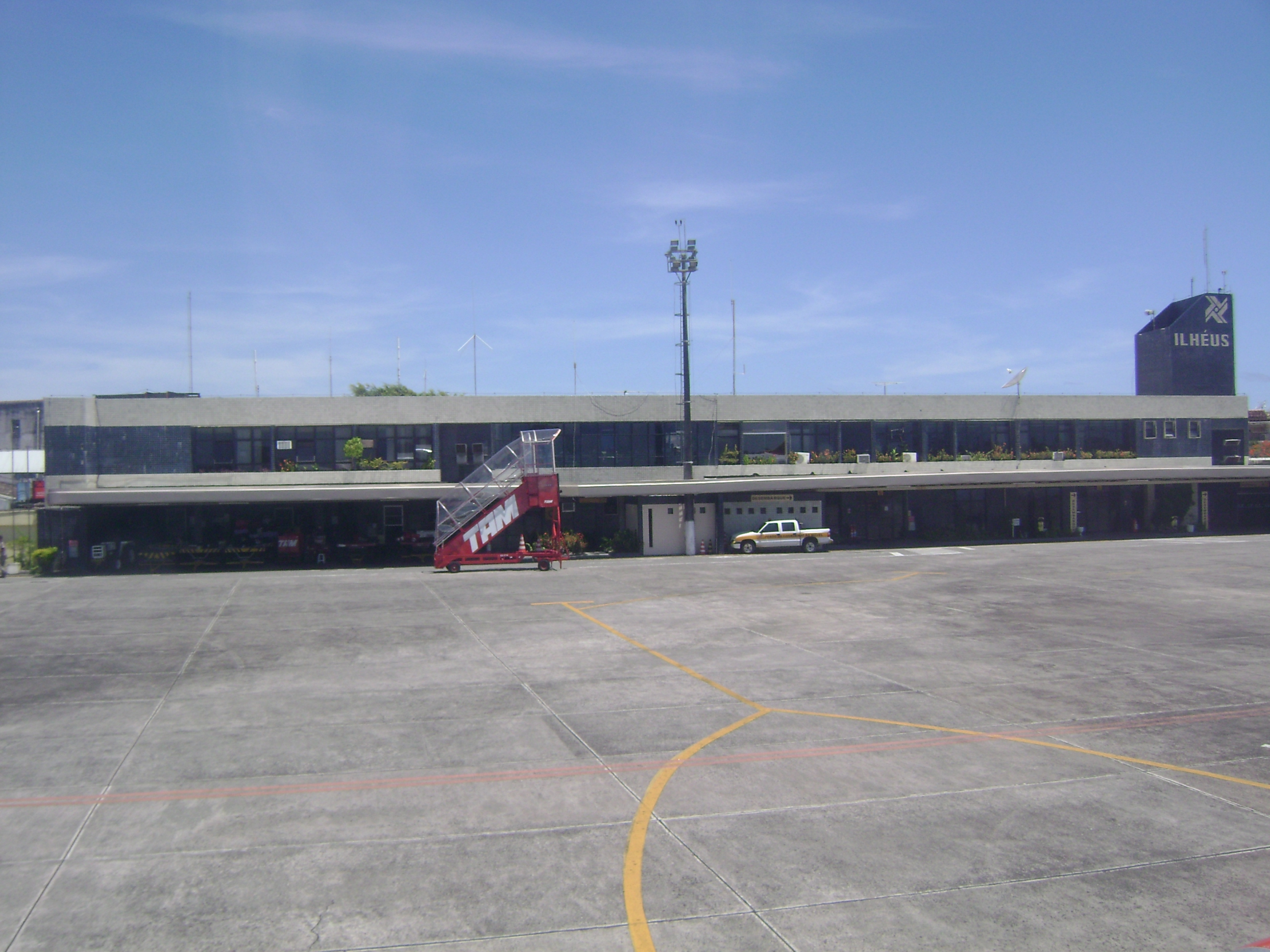
- IATA: IOS; ICAO: SBIL; LID: BA0004

Summary
- Airport type: Public
- Operator: Infraero (1981–2017); State of Bahia (2017–2018); Socicam (2018–present)
- Serves: Ilhéus
- Time zone: BRT (UTC−03:00)
- Elevation AMSL: 4 m (13 ft)
- Coordinates: 14°48′54″S 039°02′00″W
- Website: ilheus-aero.com.br

Map
- Location in Brazil

Runways
Direction	Length		Surface
Direction	m	ft	Surface
11/29	1,577	5,174	Asphalt

Statistics (2025)
- Passengers: 633,806 ▼7%
- Statistics: Secretaria de Turismo; Sources: Airport Website, ANAC, DECEA

Ilhéus/Bahia–Jorge Amado Airport (IATA: IOS, ICAO: SBIL), is the airport serving Ilhéus, Brazil. Since March 12, 2002 it is named after the writer Jorge Amado de Faria (1912–2001), who was born in the nearby city of Itabuna.

It is administrated by Socicam.

== History ==
The history of air transportation in Ilhéus is almost as old as the one of Brazil. In the 1930s, seaplanes of Syndicato Condor used to land at Ilhéus on their routes linking cities of the Brazilian coast. In 1939 the airport, then called Aeroporto do Pontal, was opened. The runway was paved in 1950.

== Airlines and destinations ==
Airlines	Destinations
Azul Brazilian Airlines	Belo Horizonte–Confins, Campinas, Salvador da Bahia; Seasonal: São Paulo–Congonhas
Gol Linhas Aéreas	Rio de Janeiro–Galeão (ends 30 January 2027), São Paulo–Congonhas; Seasonal: Salvador da Bahia
LATAM Brasil	São Paulo–Congonhas, São Paulo–Guarulhos

== Access ==
The airport is located 3 km (2 mi) from downtown Ilhéus.

== See also ==
- List of airports in Brazil
