= Teresina Airport =

Teresina–Senador Petrônio Portella Airport Aeroporto de Teresina–Senador Petrônio Portella

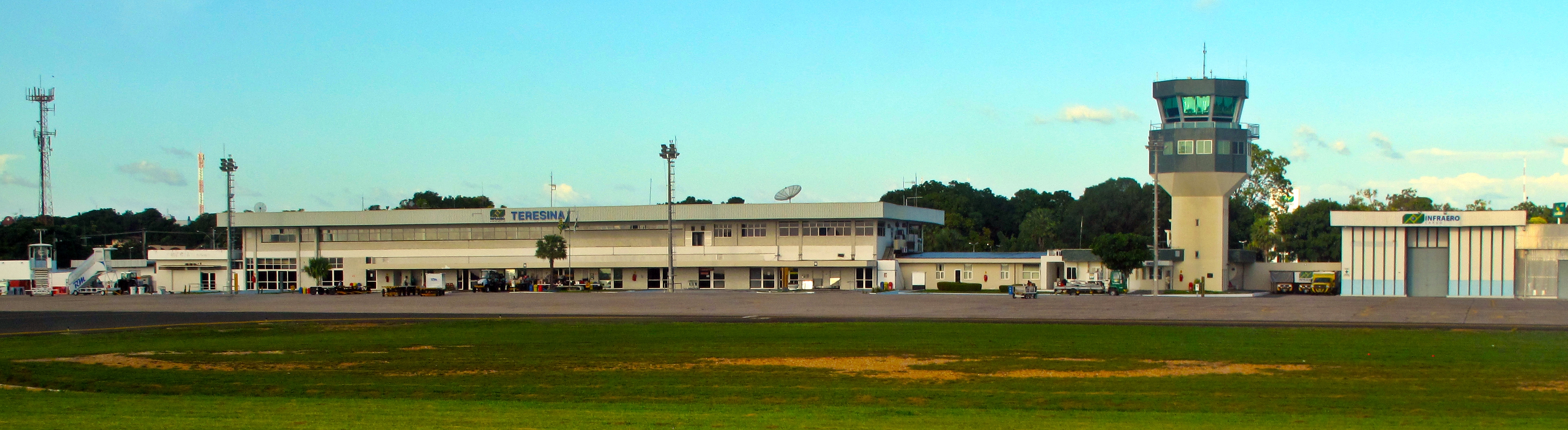
- IATA: THE; ICAO: SBTE; LID: PI0001

Summary
- Airport type: Public
- Operator: Infraero (1975–2021); Motiva (2021–2026); ASUR (2026–present)
- Serves: Teresina
- Opened: September 30, 1967
- Time zone: BRT (UTC−03:00)
- Elevation AMSL: 67 m (220 ft)
- Coordinates: 05°03′38″S 042°49′28″W
- Website: aeroportos.motiva.com.br/teresina-pi/

Map
- Location in Brazil

Runways
Direction	Length		Surface
Direction	m	ft	Surface
02/20	2,200	7,218	Asphalt

Statistics (2025)
- Passengers: 1,092,779 ▲10%
- Aircraft Operations: 11,177
- Statistics: Motiva; Sources: Airport Website, ANAC, DECEA

Teresina–Senador Petrônio Portella Airport (IATA: THE, ICAO: SBTE) is the airport serving Teresina, Brazil. Since December 22, 1999 it is named after Petrônio Portella Nunes (1925–1980) a former mayor of Teresina, governor of Piauí, senator and minister of justice.

It is operated by ASUR.

== History ==
The airport was commissioned on September 30, 1967, and on December 23, 1974, it started being operated by Infraero.

The airport underwent major renovations between 1998 and 2001, including the passenger terminal, runway and the construction of a new control tower.

Previously operated by Infraero, on April 7, 2021 CCR won a 30-year concession to operate the airport. On April 26, 2025 CCR was rebranded as Motiva.

On November 18, 2025 the entire airports portfolio of Motiva was sold to the Mexican airport operator ASUR. Motiva will cease to operate airports. The transaction was completed on August 31, 2026.

== Airlines and destinations ==
=== Passenger ===
Airlines	Destinations
Azul Brazilian Airlines	Belo Horizonte–Confins, Campinas, Parnaíba, Recife
Gol Linhas Aéreas	Brasília, Rio de Janeiro–Galeão, Salvador da Bahia, São Paulo–Guarulhos (ends 30 January 2027)
LATAM Brasil	Brasília, Fortaleza, São Paulo–Congonhas, São Paulo–Guarulhos

=== Cargo ===
Airlines	Destinations
Gol Linhas Aéreas	São Luís, São Paulo–Guarulhos

== Statistics ==
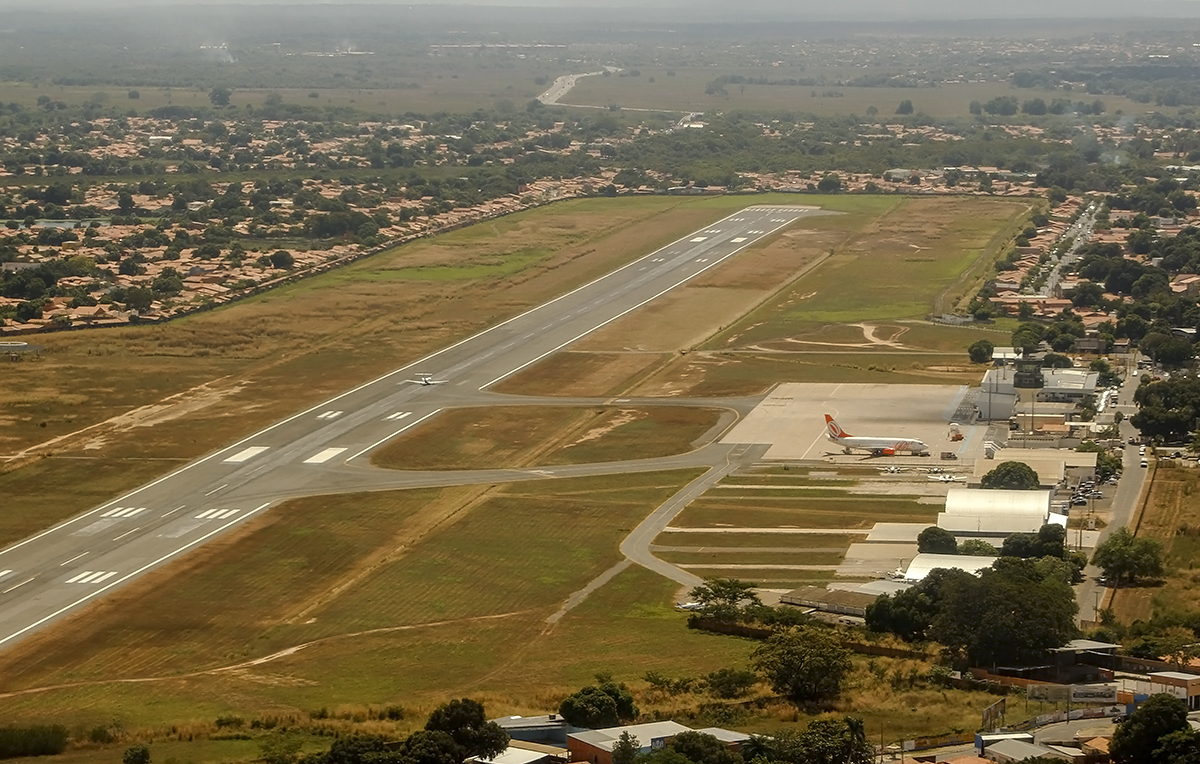
Apron aerial view

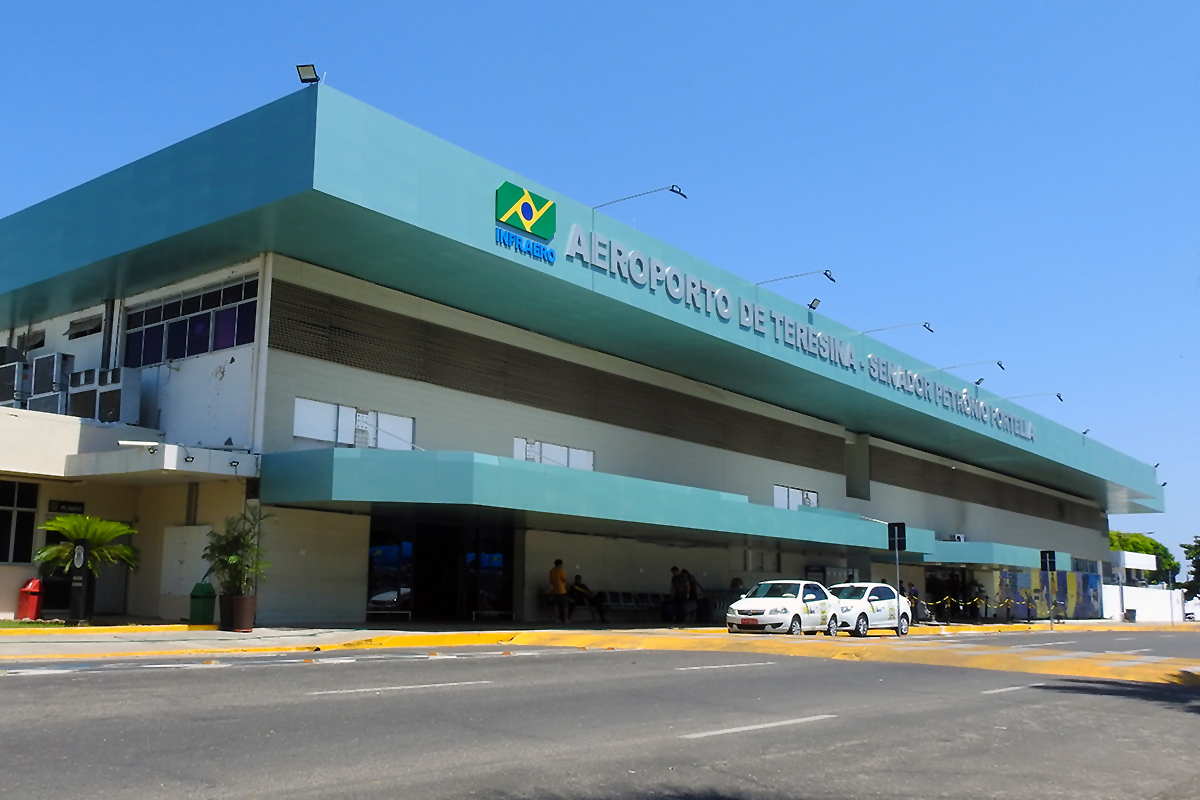
Terminal land side

Following are the number of passenger, aircraft and cargo movements at the airport, according to Infraero (2007-2021) and CCR (2022-2025) reports:

Year	Passenger	Aircraft	Cargo (t)
2025	1,092,779 ▲10%	11,177	
2024	995,955 ▲5%	11,156 ▼14%	
2023	945,217	12,953	
2022^{a}	613,953	9,756	
2021	819,024 ▲35%	11,147 ▲36%	2,271 ▲43%
2020	608,285 ▼14%	8,204 ▼34%	1,588 ▼54%
2019	1,194,020 ▲11%	12,474 ▼10%	3,424 ▲1%
2018	1,073,570 ▼3%	13,823 ▼7%	3,406 ▲27%
2017	1,104,451 ▲2%	14,848 ▼6%	2,679 ▼5%
2016	1,085,974 ▼10%	15,856 ▼13%	2,826 ▼10%
2015	1,209,559 ▲3%	18,193 ▼1%	3,132 ▼6%
2014	1,173,643 ▲11%	18,340 ▲9%	3,328 ▼9%
2013	1,091,242 ▲4%	16,799 ▲1%	3,673 ▼16%
2012	1,044,865 ▼3%	16,570 ▼7%	4,362 ▼28%
2011	1,075,655 ▲35%	17,822 ▲24%	6,081 ▲17%
2010	797,979 ▲43%	14,341 ▲27%	5,182 ▲12%
2009	557,798 ▲20%	11,314 ▼4%	4,621
2008	466,034 ▼4%	11,820 ▲1%	4,622 ▲12%
2007	484,492	11,741	4,116

Note:
^{a}: 2022 series provided by CCR is incomplete, lacking data for the months of January, February and part of March.

== Access ==
The airport is located 5 km (3 mi) from downtown Teresina.

== Gallery ==
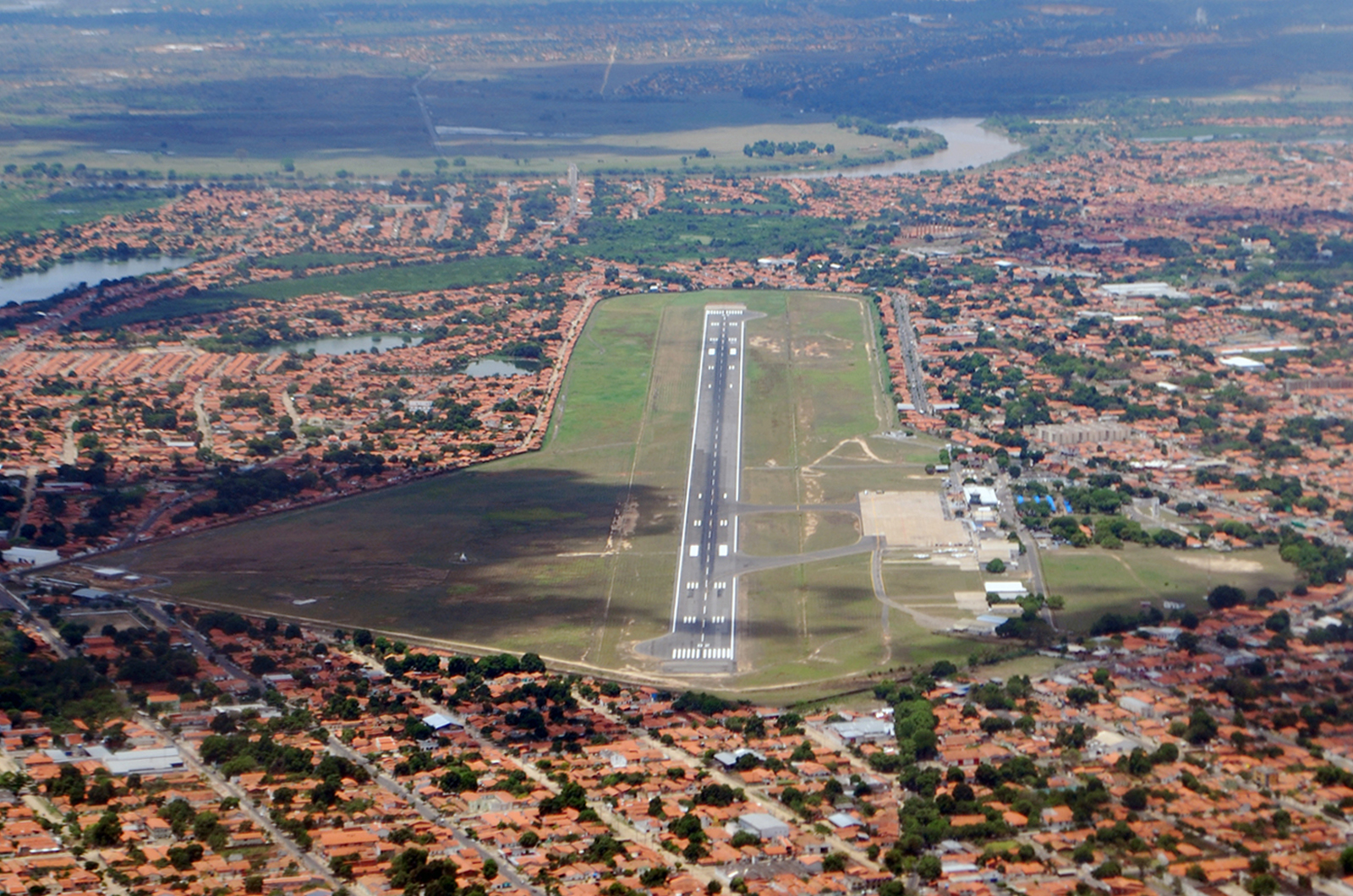
Aerial view

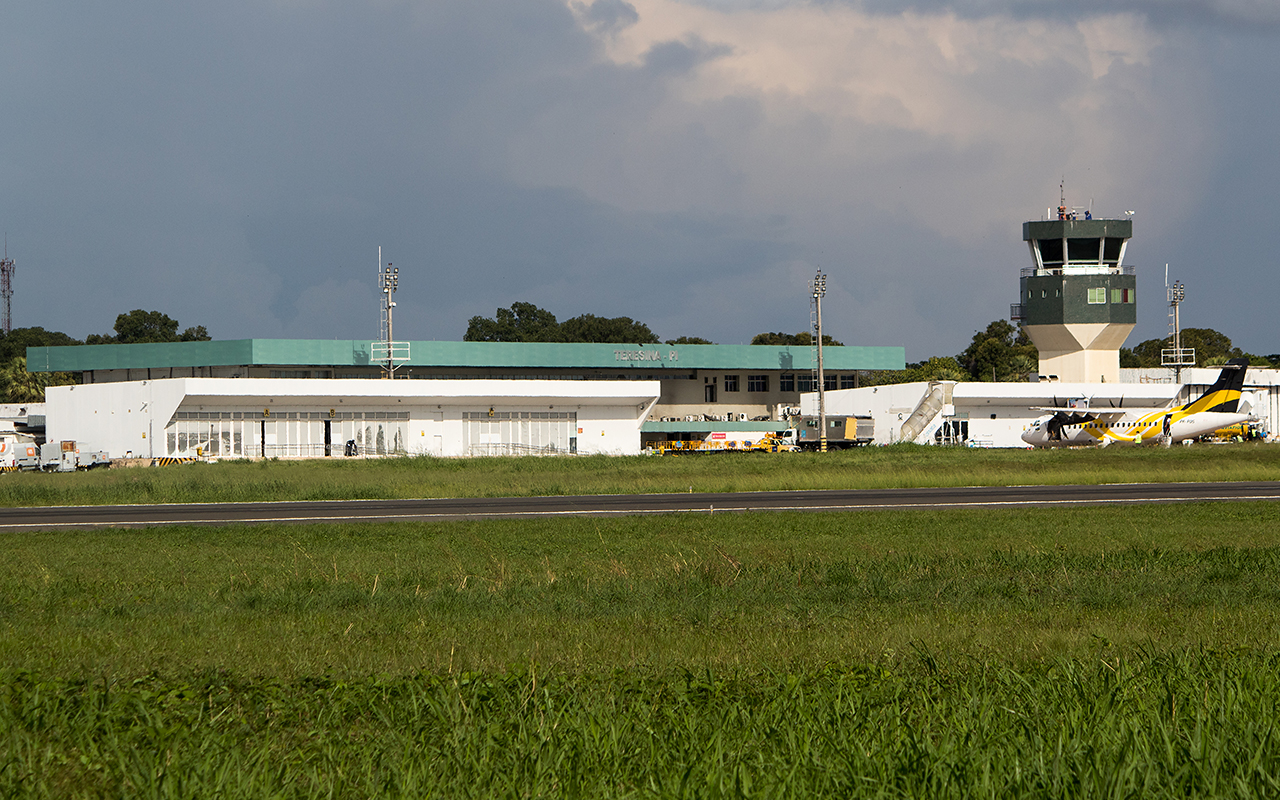
Terminal air side

== See also ==
- List of airports in Brazil
