= Multivariate testing (disambiguation) =

Multivariate testing is multivariate hypothesis testing.

Multivariate testing may also refer to:

- Multivariate statistics
- Multivariate testing in marketing
- A/B testing
