= Uberlândia Airport =

Airport in Brazil

Uberlândia–Tenente Coronel Aviador César Bombonato Airport Aeroporto Uberlândia–Ten. Cel. Av. César Bombonato
- IATA: UDI; ICAO: SBUL; LID: MG0002

Summary
- Airport type: Public
- Operator: Infraero (1980–2022); AENA (2022–present)
- Serves: Uberlândia
- Opened: May 10, 1935
- Time zone: BRT (UTC−03:00)
- Elevation AMSL: 943 m (3,094 ft)
- Coordinates: 18°53′01″S 048°13′31″W

Map
- Location in Brazil UDI (Brazil)

Runways
Direction	Length		Surface
Direction	m	ft	Surface
04/22	2,100	6,890	Asphalt

Statistics (2025)
- Passengers: 1,060,171 ▲2%
- Aircraft Operations: 23,142 ▲7%
- Metric tonnes of cargo: 1,305 ▲20%
- Statistics: AENA; Sources: ANAC, DECEA

Uberlândia–Tenente Coronel Aviador César Bombonato Airport (IATA: UDI, ICAO: SBUL) is the airport serving Uberlândia, Brazil. Since June 7, 2001 the airport has been named after the Uberlândia-born pilot of the Brazilian Air Force César Bombonato (1955–1998), who died in an air crash.

It is operated by AENA.

== History ==
The first flight to the site of the airport was operated on May 10, 1935, but the area was officially designated only on July 21, 1953.

In 1980, the administration of the airport was taken over by Infraero and on June 8, 2001, the name was officially changed to include a tribute to the aviator César Bombonato.

In 2005, the airport terminal was extensively renewed and enlarged. In 2007, the runway was extended.

Previously operated by Infraero, on August 18, 2022, the consortium AENA won a 30-year concession to operate the airport.

On July 7, 2026, a brand new passenger terminal building on the opposite side of the runway was unveiled. It replaced the old facility, which was then closed.

== Airlines and destinations ==
Airlines	Destinations
Azul Brazilian Airlines	Belo Horizonte–Confins, Campinas; Seasonal: Fortaleza, João Pessoa, Maceió, Natal, Porto Seguro, Salvador da Bahia
Gol Linhas Aéreas	São Paulo–Congonhas, São Paulo–Guarulhos (ends 31 January 2027), Rio de Janeiro–Galeão (ends 30 January 2027)
LATAM Brasil	Brasília, São Paulo–Congonhas, São Paulo–Guarulhos

== Accidents and incidents ==
- 28 February 1952: a Panair do Brasil Douglas DC-3A-393 registration PP-PCN flying from Rio de Janeiro-Santos Dumont to Goiânia via Uberlândia. One of the wings struck a tree shortly after the pilot executed a go-around. The flight had been cleared to land at Uberlândia. Of the 31 occupants, 8 died.

== Access ==
The airport is located 9 km (6 mi) from downtown Uberlândia.

== See also ==
- List of airports in Brazil
