= Juazeiro do Norte Airport =

Airport in Brazil

Orlando Bezerra de Menezes Airport Aeroporto Orlando Bezerra de Menezes
- IATA: JDO; ICAO: SBJU; LID: CE0002

Summary
- Airport type: Public
- Operator: Infraero (2002–2019); AENA (2019–present)
- Serves: Juazeiro do Norte
- Time zone: BRT (UTC−03:00)
- Elevation AMSL: 409 m (1,342 ft)
- Coordinates: 07°13′09″S 039°16′10″W
- Website: www.aenabrasil.com.br/pt/aeroportos/aeroporto-de-juazeiro-do-norte-orlando-bezerra-de-menezes/index.html

Map
- Location in Brazil

Runways
Direction	Length		Surface
Direction	m	ft	Surface
13/31	1,940	6,365	Asphalt

Statistics (2025)
- Passengers: 502,525 ▲1%
- Aircraft Operations: 7,081 ▼6%
- Metric tonnes of cargo: 609 ▼17%
- Statistics: AENA; Sources: Airport Website, ANAC, DECEA

Orlando Bezerra de Menezes Airport (IATA: JDO, ICAO: SBJU) is the airport serving Juazeiro do Norte, Brazil. It is named after a local politician and entrepreneur. The airport serves southern Ceará, southeastern Piauí, northeastern Pernambuco, and the sertão of Paraíba.

The airport is operated by AENA.

== History ==
The airport was inaugurated on 15 September 1954 as Cariri Regional Airport. It was administrated by the municipal government of Juazeiro do Norte for several years until it was transferred to the State Government.

Since the eighties it has regularly received flights, starting commercial operations with the airlines VARIG and VASP.

The airport had been operated by Infraero from 2002 until 2019. On 15 March 2019, AENA won a 30-year concession to operate the airport.

== Airlines and destinations ==
Airlines	Destinations
Azul Brazilian Airlines	Campinas; Seasonal: Recife
Gol Linhas Aéreas	São Paulo–Guarulhos
LATAM Brasil	Fortaleza, São Paulo–Guarulhos

== Access ==
The airport is located 6 km (4 mi) from downtown Juazeiro do Norte.

== See also ==
- List of airports in Brazil
