= Porto Seguro Airport =

Porto Seguro International Airport Aeroporto Internacional de Porto Seguro
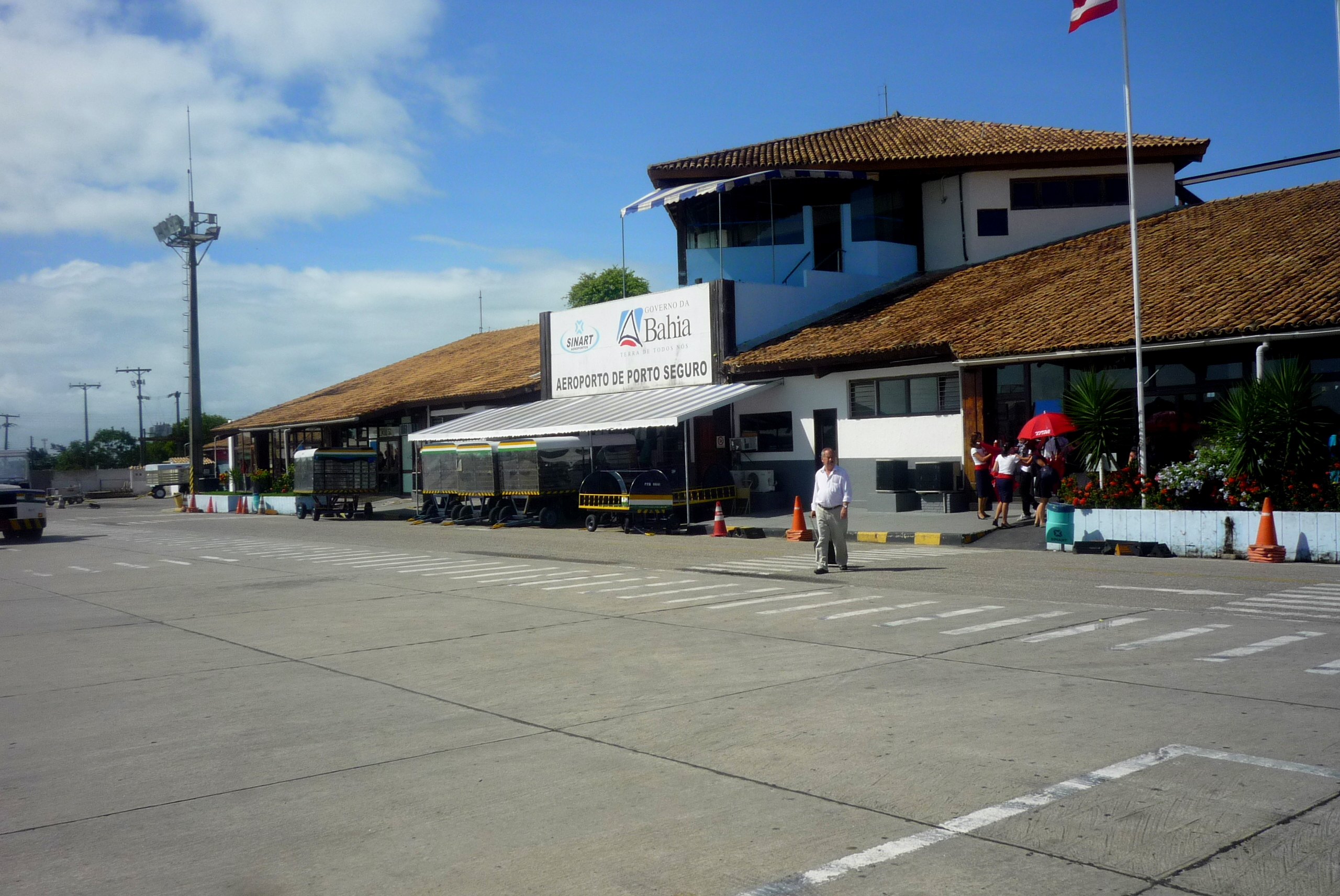
- IATA: BPS; ICAO: SBPS; LID: BA0002

Summary
- Airport type: Public
- Operator: Sinart (2000–present)
- Serves: Porto Seguro
- Time zone: BRT (UTC−03:00)
- Elevation AMSL: 52 m (171 ft)
- Coordinates: 16°26′17″S 039°04′40″W
- Website: aeroportoportoseguro.com.br

Map
- Location in Brazil

Runways
Direction	Length		Surface
Direction	m	ft	Surface
10/28	2,000	6,562	Asphalt

Statistics (2025)
- Passengers: 2,564,297 ▲15%
- Statistics: Secretaria de Turismo; Sources: Airport Website, ANAC, DECEA

Porto Seguro International Airport (IATA: BPS, ICAO: SBPS) is the airport serving Porto Seguro, Brazil.

It is operated by Sinart.

== History ==
The airport was commissioned in 1982 but in 1997 a brand new passenger terminal and apron were opened.

Porto Seguro is one of the most popular tourist destinations in Brazil, served mainly by seasonal and charter flights.

Since March 2000, the airport has been operated by Sinart.

== Airlines and destinations ==
Airlines	Destinations
Aerolíneas Argentinas	Buenos Aires–Aeroparque
Andes Líneas Aéreas	Seasonal charter: Buenos Aires–Ezeiza, Córdoba (AR)
Azul Brazilian Airlines	Belo Horizonte–Confins, Campinas, Goiânia, Presidente Prudente, Ribeirão Preto, Salvador da Bahia, São José do Rio Preto, São Paulo–Congonhas; Seasonal: Londrina, São Paulo–Guarulhos, Uberlândia
Gol Linhas Aéreas	Belo Horizonte–Confins, Rio de Janeiro–Galeão, Salvador da Bahia (ends 31 January 2027), São Paulo–Congonhas, São Paulo–Guarulhos; Seasonal: Brasília, Buenos Aires–Ezeiza
JetSmart Argentina	Seasonal: Buenos Aires–Ezeiza (begins 5 January 2027)
LATAM Brasil	Brasília, Rio de Janeiro–Galeão, São Paulo–Congonhas, São Paulo–Guarulhos; Seasonal: Rio de Janeiro–Santos Dumont

== Statistics ==
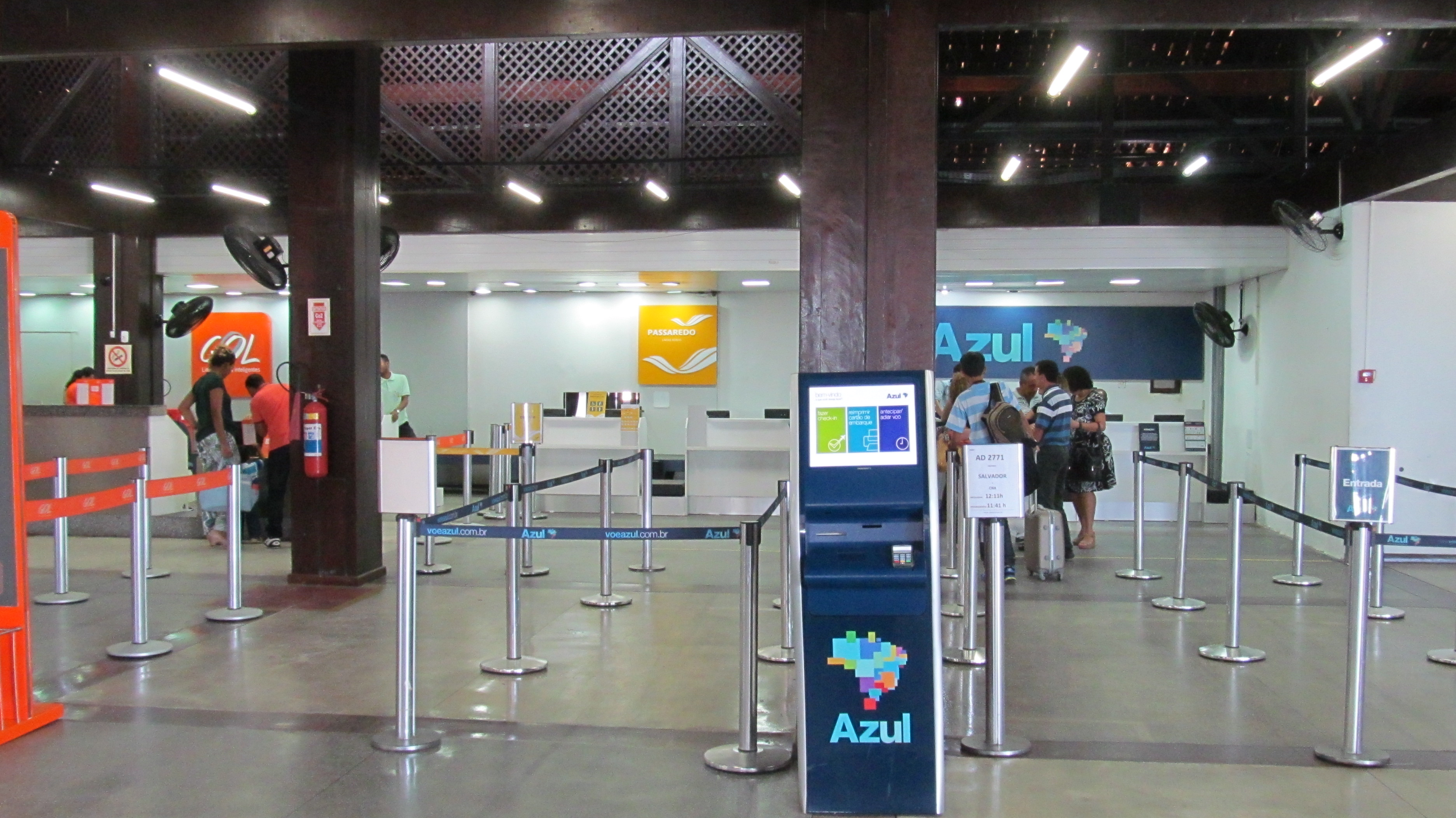
View of check-in area

Following is the number of passenger movements at the airport, according to the Tourism Secretary of the State of Bahia (2007-2025):

Year	Passenger
2025	2,564,297 ▲15%
2024	2,230,605 ▲9%
2023	2,041,617 ▲2%
2022	2,000,543 ▲36%
2021	1,474,352 ▲73%
2020	853,827 ▼55%
2019	1,907,551 ▲8%
2018	1,763,678 ▲2%
2017	1,730,315 ▲8%
2016	1,609,346 ▲9%
2015	1,473,859 ▼4%
2014	1,533,148 ▲13%
2013	1,352,611 ▲8%
2012	1,257,596 ▲3%
2011	1,218,273 ▲9%
2010	1,115,374 ▲27%
2009	876,418 ▲6%
2008	830,366 ▲8%
2007	769,574

== Access ==
The airport is located 2 km (1 mi) from downtown Porto Seguro.

== See also ==
- List of airports in Brazil
