= Navegantes Airport =

Navegantes–Ministro Victor Konder International Airport Aeroporto Internacional de Navegantes–Ministro Victor Konder

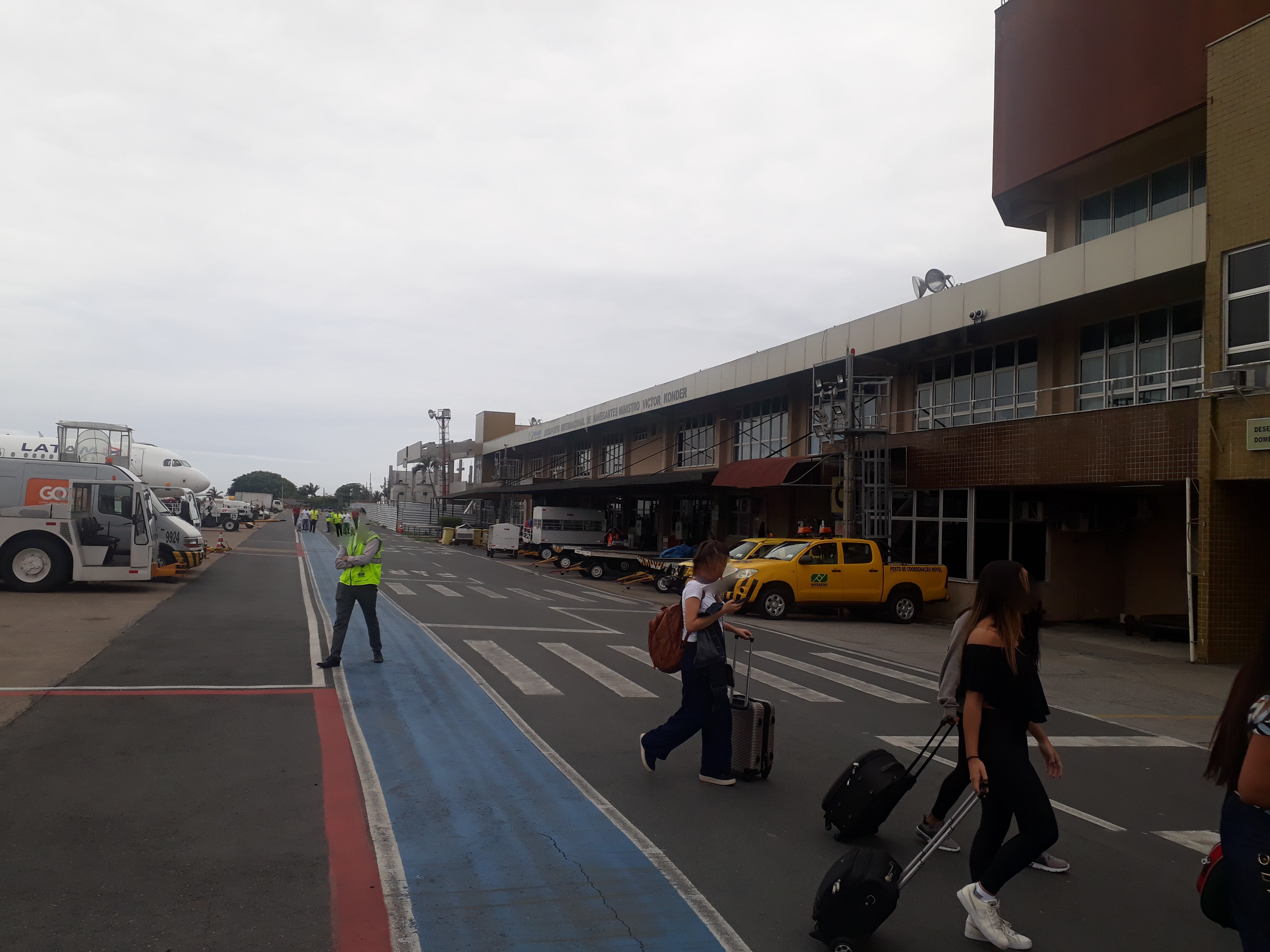
- IATA: NVT; ICAO: SBNF; LID: SC0002

Summary
- Airport type: Public
- Operator: Infraero (1980–2021); Motiva (2021–2026); ASUR (2026–present)
- Serves: Navegantes
- Time zone: BRT (UTC−03:00)
- Elevation AMSL: 5 m (16 ft)
- Coordinates: 26°52′43″S 048°39′03″W
- Website: aeroportos.motiva.com.br/navegantes-sc/

Map
- Location in Brazil

Runways
Direction	Length		Surface
Direction	m	ft	Surface
08/26	1,800	5,906	Asphalt

Statistics (2025)
- Passengers: 2,287,038 ▲15%
- Aircraft Operations: 25,410 ▲10%
- Statistics: Statistics: Motiva; Sources: Airport Website, ANAC, DECEA

Navegantes–Ministro Victor Konder International Airport (IATA: NVT, ICAO: SBNF) is the airport serving Navegantes, Brazil, as well as Itajaí, Balneário Camboriú, and Blumenau. Since June 10, 1959, it is named after the Itajaí-born Victor Konder (1886–1941), Minister of Public Works (1926–1930), whose administration encouraged the birth of Brazilian commercial aviation.

It is operated by ASUR.

== History ==
At the time of its foundation, Navegantes was a district of Itajaí. With its emancipation in 1961, it was necessary to adapt the airport name to its present form. This was done on December 30, 2002, by a presidential decree.

Previously operated by Infraero, on April 7, 2021, CCR won a 30-year concession to operate the airport. On April 26, 2025, CCR was rebranded as Motiva.

On November 18, 2025, the entire airports portfolio of Motiva was sold to the Mexican airport operator ASUR. Motiva will cease to operate airports. The transaction was completed on August 31, 2026.

== Airlines and destinations ==
Airlines	Destinations
Azul Brazilian Airlines	Campinas; Seasonal: Belo Horizonte–Confins, São Paulo–Congonhas
Gol Linhas Aéreas	Rio de Janeiro–Galeão, São Paulo–Congonhas, São Paulo–Guarulhos
LATAM Brasil	São Paulo–Congonhas, São Paulo–Guarulhos; Seasonal: Brasília

== Statistics ==
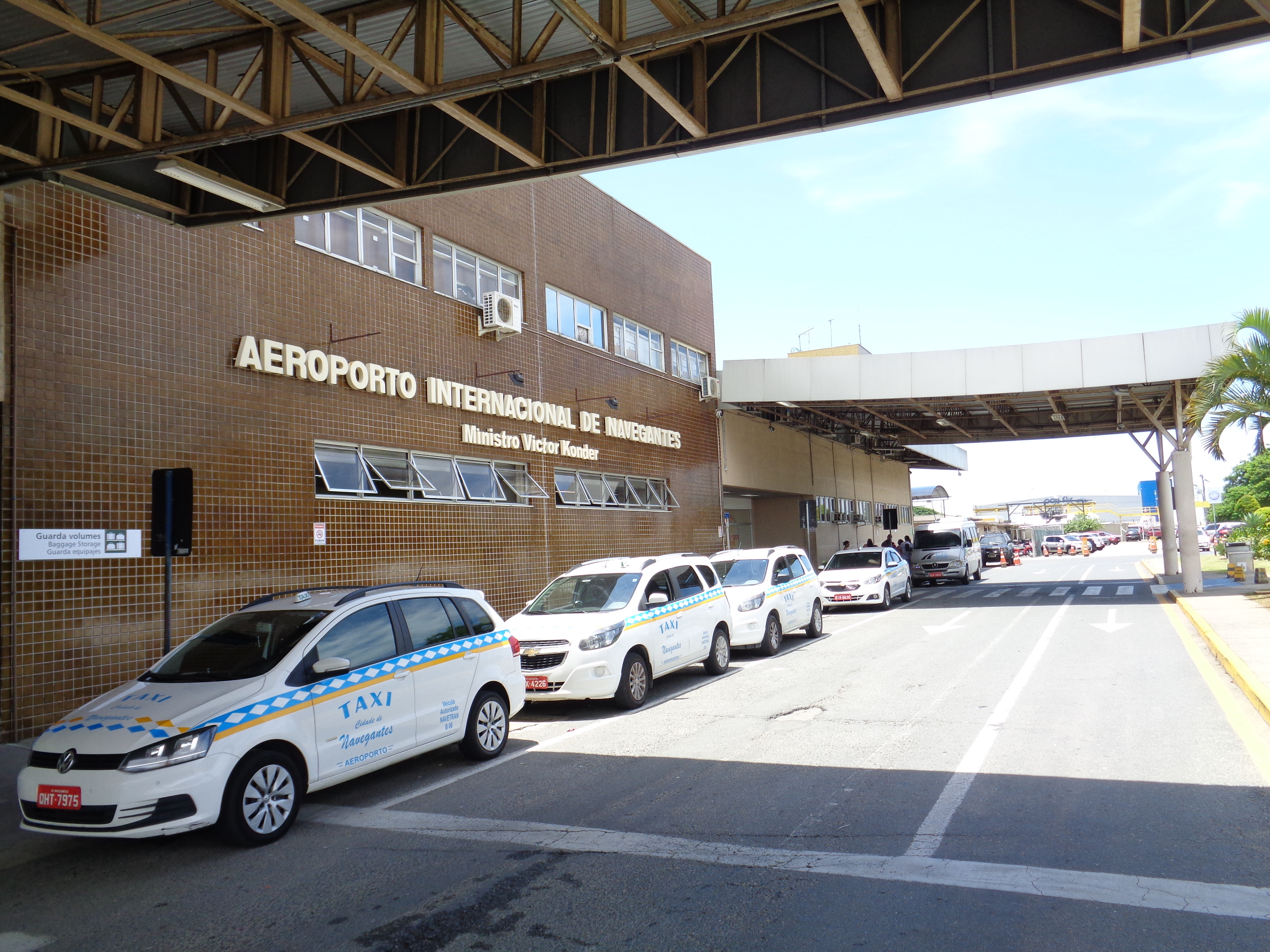
Landside of passenger terminal in 2018

Following are the number of passenger, aircraft and cargo movements at the airport, according to Infraero (2007–2021) and Motiva (2022–2025) reports:

Year	Passenger	Aircraft	Cargo (t)
2025	2,287,038 ▲15%	25,410 ▲10%	
2024	1,996,630 ▼10%	23,114 ▼11%	
2023	2,217,744	25,881	
2022^{a}	1,486,900	19,049	
2021	1,396,981 ▲52%	19,508 ▲39%	3,140 ▲37%
2020	921,153 ▼52%	14,060 ▼38%	2,287 ▼39%
2019	1,929,043 ▲1%	22,787	3,731 ▼11%
2018	1,908,976 ▲20%	22,897 ▲15%	4,171 ▲113%
2017	1,588,921 ▲8%	19,924 ▲3%	1,955 ▼7%
2016	1,471,037 ▼1%	19,273 ▼10%	2,106 ▼18%
2015	1,483,308 ▲10%	21,393 ▲3%	2,567 ▼4%
2014	1,351,557 ▲12%	20,704 ▼12%	2,670 ▲43%
2013	1,203,561 ▼6%	23,517 ▼4%	1,873 ▲8%
2012	1,277,486 ▲9%	24,485 ▲13%	1,732 ▲3%
2011	1,167,898 ▲37%	21,662 ▲35%	1,689 ▲25%
2010	852,487 ▲44%	16,094 ▲33%	1,350 ▲53%
2009	593,900 ▲50%	12,124 ▲4%	884 ▼4%
2008	395,743 ▼6%	11,705 ▲33%	922 ▲13%
2007	419,113	8,806	816

Note:
^{a}: 2022 series provided by CCR is incomplete, lacking data for the months of January, February and part of March.

== Access ==
In relation to their city centers, the airport is located 12 km (7 mi) from Navegantes, 7 km (4 mi) from Itajaí, 20 km (12 mi) from Balneário Camboriú, and 45 km (28 mi) from Blumenau.

== See also ==
- List of airports in Brazil
