= Navegantes =

Brazilian city

- City
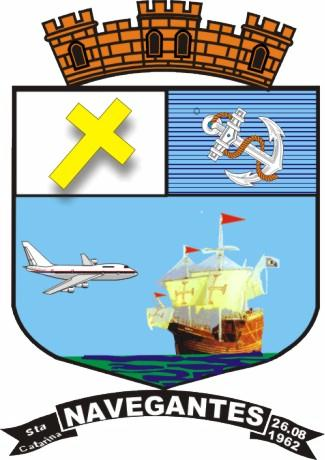
- Flag Coat of arms
- Nickname(s): Navega City, Areia Branca, Navega Beach
- Location of Navegantes

- Location within Brazil
- Coordinates: 26°53′56″S 48°39′14″W
- Country: Brazil
- Region: South
- State: (Santa Catarina (state)) Santa Catarina
- Founded: August 26, 1962

Government
  - Mayor: Liba Fronza (Democrats)

Area
  - Total: 112.0 km^{2} (43.2 sq mi)
- Elevation: 12 m (39 ft)

Population (2024)
  - Total: 93.619
  - Density: 0.8359/km^{2} (2.165/sq mi)
- Time zone: UTC−3 (BRT)
- HDI (2000): 0.774
- Website: www.navegantes.sc.gov.br

Navegantes (Portuguese pronunciation: [naveˈɡɐ̃tʃis], Seafarers) is a coastal and tourist city located in Santa Catarina state, southern Brazil. The population is 93.619 (2024 est.) in an area of 112.0 km².

Ministro Victor Konder International Airport serves the popular beach resort of Balneário Camboriú, and other cities including Itajaí and Blumenau.

== Economy ==
The main activity is fishing industry and ship building. A private port was built in 2007, served by 4 berths (approximately 900m straight) and focused on refrigerated container cargo, due to Santa Catarina State having the biggest meat industry in Brazil. As of 2012, there were 6 cranes, and plans for expansion of the quay.
