= WebJet Linhas Aéreas Econômicas =

Brazilian airline

Webjet Linhas Aéreas Econômicas
IATA	ICAO	Call sign
WH	WEB	WEB-BRASIL
- Founded: 2004
- Ceased operations: 2012 (integrated into Gol Airlines)
- Operating bases: Rio de Janeiro-Galeão; São Paulo–Guarulhos
- Fleet size: 30
- Destinations: 20
- Parent company: Gol Airlines
- Headquarters: Rio de Janeiro, Brazil
- Key people: Constantino de Oliveira Júnior (Chairman); Rogério Ottoni (President and CEO)
- Website: www.webjet.com.br

First logo

WebJet Linhas Aéreas Econômicas S.A. was a low-cost Brazilian airline, based in Rio de Janeiro, which operated from 2005 to 2012. After a succession of owners, it was acquired in July 2011 by Gol Transportes Aéreos, which eventually decided to close it. It operated on a low-cost, all-economy class and domestic-only airline business model.

== History ==
Webjet was founded by Rogério Ottoni in 2004, Webjet planned to start flying the MD-82 leased from Lion Air that was formerly registered PK-LMN which due in 2006. But due to Lion Air Flight 538 disaster, they cancel the MD-80 leased and changed to the 737-300.

Webjet officially started operations on July 12, 2005, with a Boeing 737-300 that formerly operated by Varig and began service from Rio de Janeiro-Galeão to Porto Alegre, Curitiba and Salvador.

On January 17, 2006, it was sold to Jacob Barata Filho and Wagner Abrahão, owners of companies related to tourism and transportation in the State of Rio de Janeiro. The second aircraft was received in November of that year.

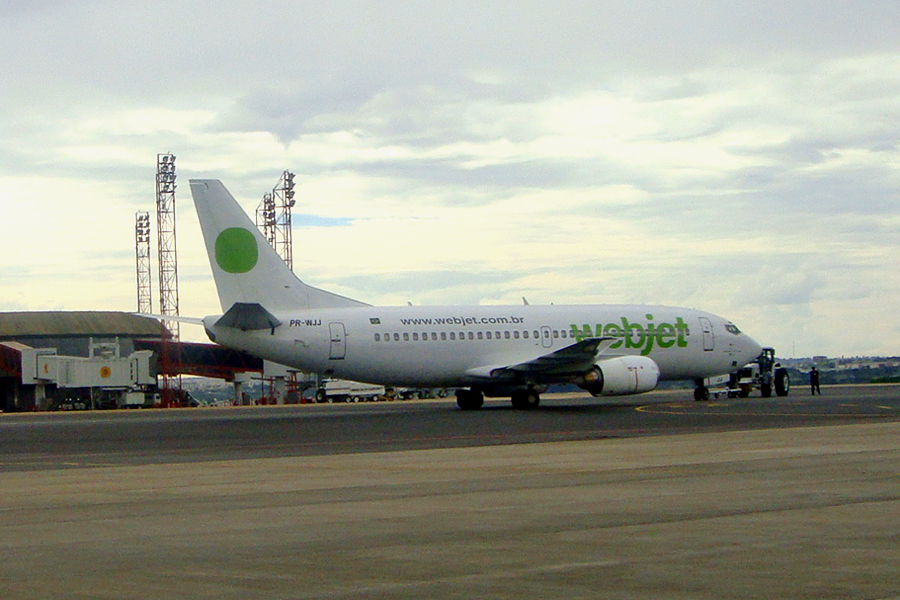
Webjet's Boeing 737-300 taxiing at Presidente Juscelino Kubitschek International Airport, Brasília, Brazil (2009)

On June 25, 2007, Webjet was again sold to CVC Viagens, the biggest Brazilian tour operator. CVC wanted to reduce its dependence on regular carriers, particularly on TAM. In December 2007 the third aircraft was received and since then new aircraft were regularly added to the fleet, increasing destinations and frequencies.

On February 13, 2009, Wagner Ferreira took Paulo Enrique Coco's CEO position. He immediately implemented a few changes to make Webjet more competitive: on March 9, scheduled flights to Ilhéus, Maceió and Porto Seguro ceased and became regular charter destinations; on April 27, flights from Rio de Janeiro-Santos Dumont to Brasília, São Paulo-Guarulhos, and Belo Horizonte-Confins were added, but Webjet still kept operating from Rio de Janeiro-Galeão; a new logo and slogan were unveiled on that same day

On February 11, 2010, Wagner Ferreira left the presidency of Webjet and Julio Rudge Perotti, the Vice-President Operations took over his position. In July 2010, Fernando Sporleder joined the airline as Vice-President Operations from the same position at TAM.

On September 27, 2010, after the airline cancelled more than 50% of its flights scheduled for the day, the National Civil Aviation Agency of Brazil (ANAC) ordered the suspension of ticket sales for 5 days to investigate reasons. After this period, sales and operations resumed as scheduled.

Although in Brazil Webjet informally used the prefix WJ for its flight numbers, officially it had been assigned by IATA the code WH.

In April 2011 it was reported that the owners of CVC, Carlyle Private Equity Fund (63,6%), and Guilherme Paulus (36,4%), were in conversations with TUI AG to possibly sell part of their participation in CVC to the German tour operator. Since CVC was the owner of Webjet, should the transaction go ahead, Webjet would have been directly impacted.

Instead, on July 8, 2011, VRG Linhas Aéreas, owner of the brands Gol and Varig, announced the intention to purchase full control of WebJet Linhas Aéreas. The purchase contract was signed on August 2, 2011. On October 10, 2012 the purchase received its final approval with some operational restrictions from the Brazilian regulatory agency. Both companies continued to operate independently, however it was announced that in 2013 the Webjet brand would cease to the exist and will be completely integrated into Gol. Integration started in October 2012 when sales requested via Webjet's website started to be redirected to Gol's site.

On November 21, 2011, GOL Linhas Aereas announced that in December 2011, the renovation of Webjet's fleet would also start and would be completed within 12-18 months. All Boeing 737-300s would be replaced by Boeing 737-800s.

However, on November 23, 2012, Webjet abruptly ceased operations and all its services were incorporated by Gol, with the loss of 850 jobs, including pilots, cabin crew, airport, and administrative staff. Passengers with Webjet tickets would be rebooked to Gol flights at no extra cost. Webjet's entire fleet was grounded and Gol announced its intention to return all 737-300s to lessors until the end of the first quarter of 2013, while the 737-800s are returned to Gol at the same time.

== Destinations ==
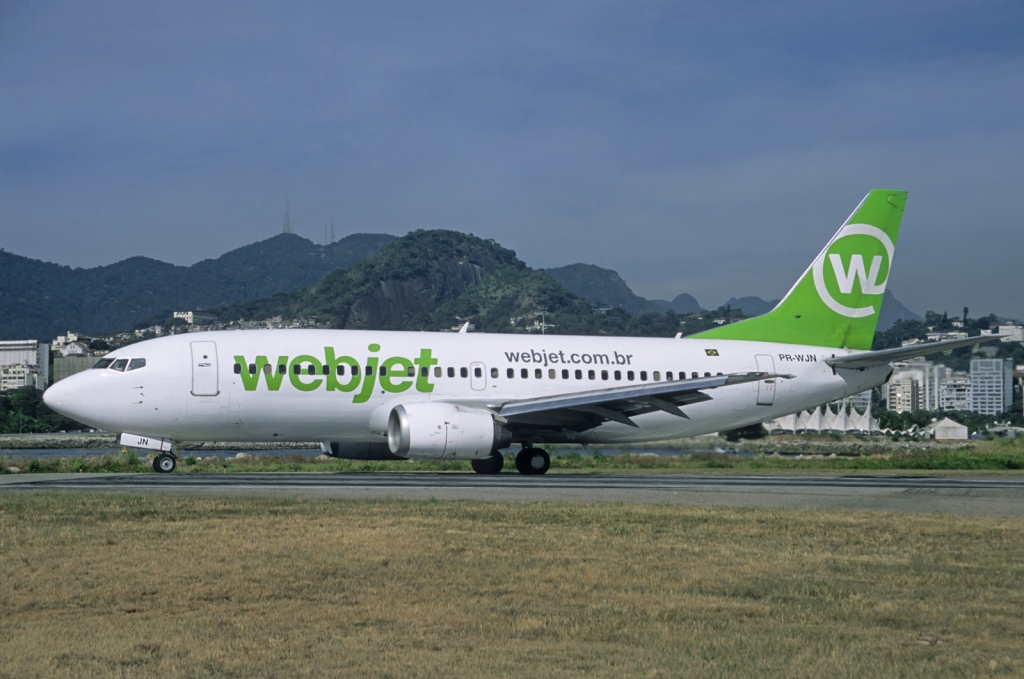
Webjet's Boeing 737-300 with modified colors in 2011

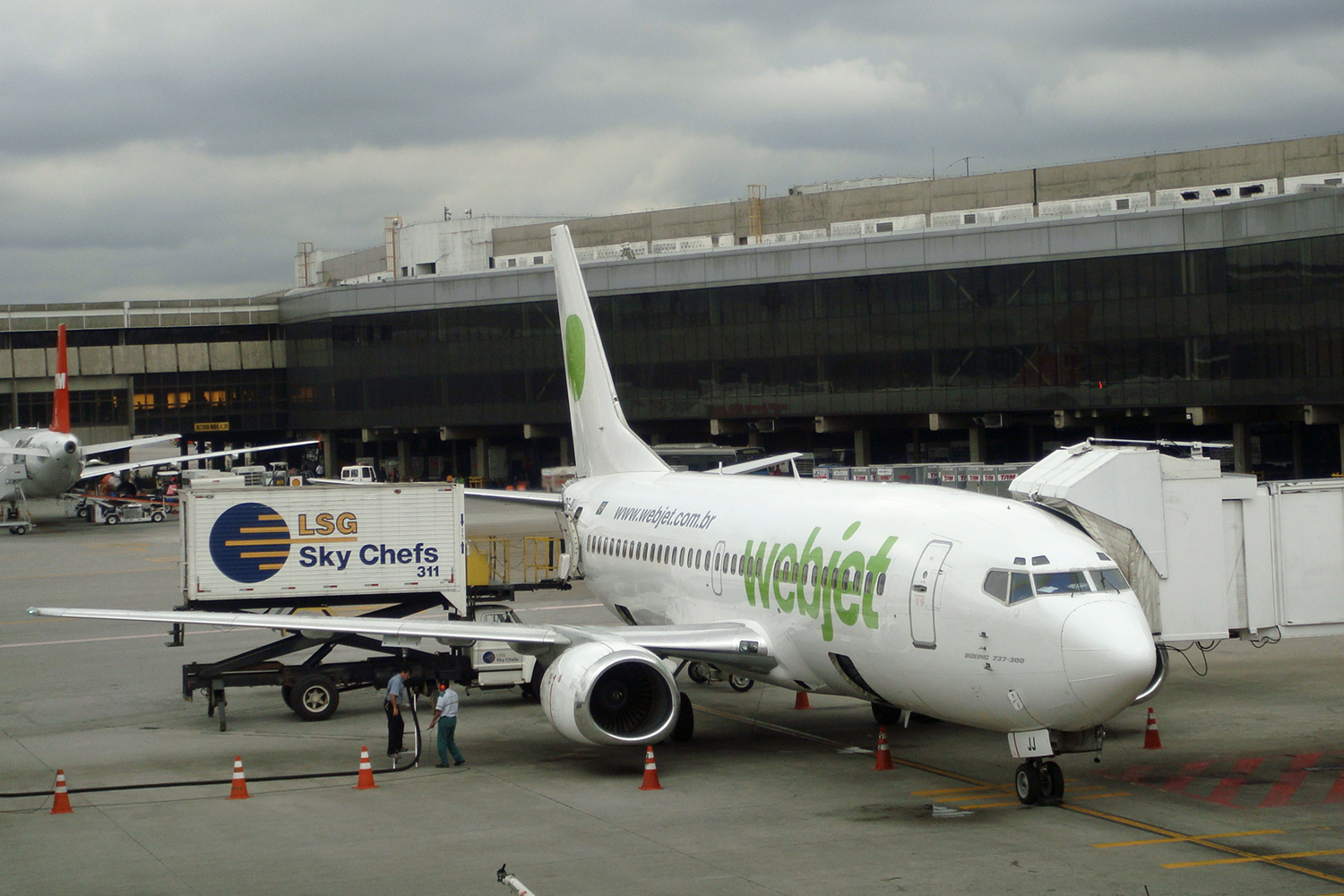
Webjet's Boeing 737-300 being serviced at the gate at Guarulhos International Airport, São Paulo, Brazil (2009)

As of September 2012, Webjet operated scheduled services to the following destinations:

- Belo Horizonte – Confins/Tancredo Neves International Airport
- Brasília – Pres. Juscelino Kubitschek International Airport
- Cuiabá – Marechal Rondon International Airport
- Curitiba – Afonso Pena International Airport
- Florianópolis – Hercílio Luz International Airport
- Fortaleza – Pinto Martins International Airport
- Foz do Iguaçu – Cataratas International Airport
- Goiânia – Santa Genoveva Airport
- Maceió – Zumbi dos Palmares International Airport
- Natal – Augusto Severo International Airport
- Navegantes – Min. Victor Konder International Airport
- Porto Alegre – Salgado Filho International Airport
- Porto Seguro – Porto Seguro Airport
- Recife – Guararapes/Gilberto Freyre International Airport
- Ribeirão Preto – Leite Lopes Airport
- Rio de Janeiro
  - Galeão/Antonio Carlos Jobim International Airport Main Base
  - Santos Dumont Airport
- Salvador da Bahia – Dep. Luís Eduardo Magalhães International Airport
- São Paulo
  - Congonhas Airport
  - Guarulhos/Gov. André Franco Montoro International Airport Base

Terminated destination: Uberlândia

== Fleet ==
As of November 2012, the fleet of Webjet Linhas Aéreas included the following aircraft:

WebJet Linhas Aéreas Econômicas fleet
Aircraft	Total	Orders	Passengers (Y)	Notes
Boeing 737-300	24	0	148	
Boeing 737-800	6	0	184	

== See also ==
- List of defunct airlines of Brazil
