= Gol Linhas Aéreas =

Low-cost airline of Brazil

GOL Linhas Aéreas Inteligentes S.A.

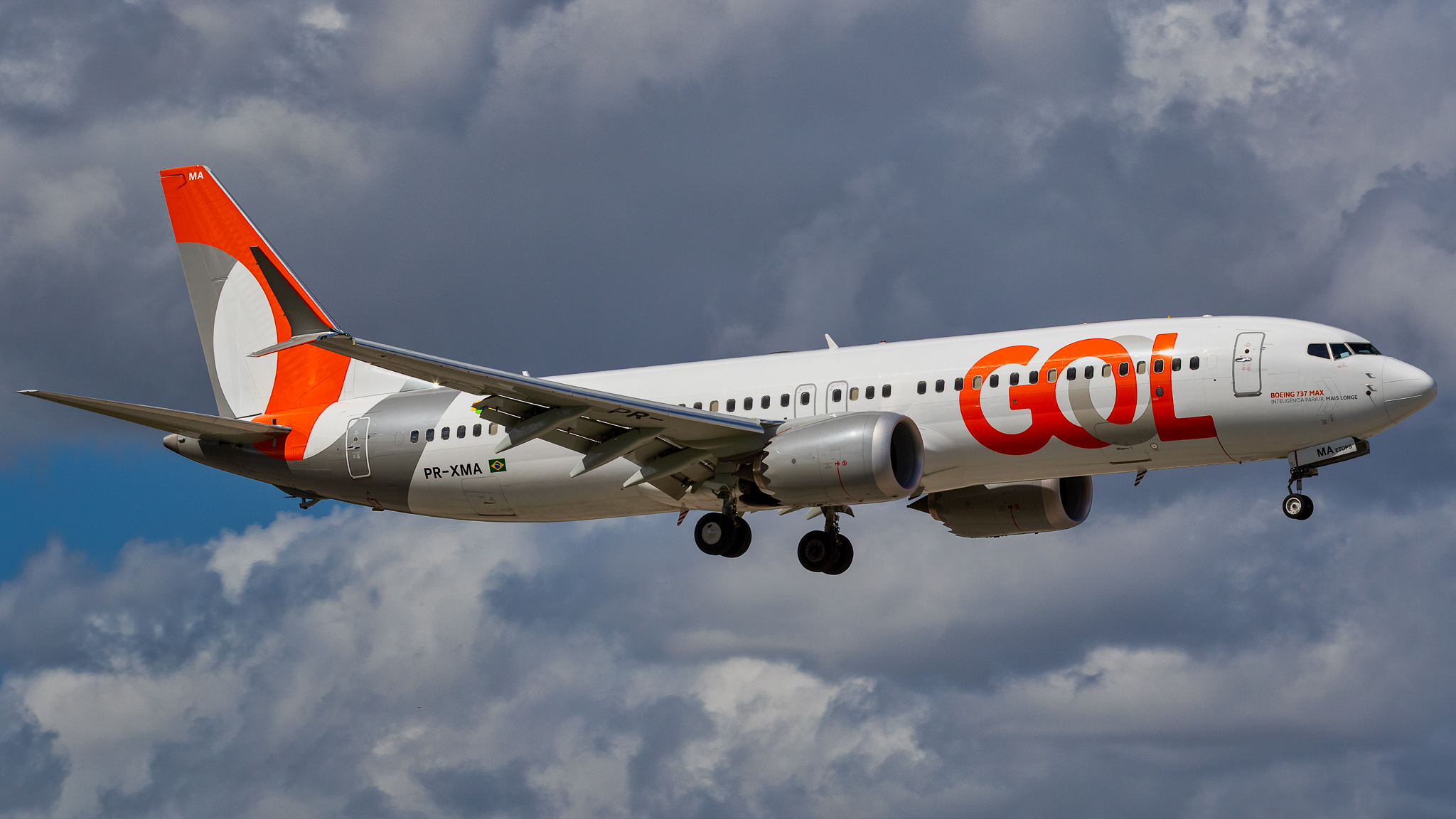
- A Boeing 737 MAX of GOL
IATA	ICAO	Call sign
G3	GLO	GOL
- Founded: 2000; 26 years ago
- Commenced operations: 15 January 2001; 25 years ago
- AOC #: 12,669 - 2 October 2023
- Hubs: Brasília; Rio de Janeiro–Galeão; São Paulo–Congonhas; São Paulo–Guarulhos
- Focus cities: Fortaleza; Rio de Janeiro–Santos Dumont; Salvador da Bahia
- Frequent-flyer program: Smiles
- Fleet size: 145
- Destinations: 79
- Parent company: Abra Group
- Traded as: B3: GOLL4; NYSE: GOL
- Headquarters: Rio de Janeiro, Brazil
- Key people: Celso Ferrer (President & CEO)
- Founders: Constantino de Oliveira Júnior; Constantino de Oliveira Senior
- Revenue: ▲ R$ 7.4 billion (2021)
- Net income: ▼US$ -200.8 million (2018)
- Employees: 13,969 (2021)
- Website: www.voegol.com.br

The airline's previous logo used from 2001-2015

GOL Linhas Aéreas S.A ("GOL Airlines S.A.") is a Brazilian low cost airline based in Rio de Janeiro, Brazil. According to the National Civil Aviation Agency of Brazil (ANAC), between January and December 2019, GOL had 37.7% of the domestic and 3.8% of the international market shares in terms of passenger-kilometers flown, making it the largest domestic and third largest international airline in Brazil.

GOL competes in Brazil and other South American countries primarily with LATAM Brasil and Azul. It also owned the brand Varig between 2007 and 2013, although now that name refers to what is informally known as the "new" Varig, founded in 2006, not to the extinct "old" Varig airline, founded in 1927.

GOL operates a growing domestic and international scheduled network. Its main hubs are São Paulo–Guarulhos International Airport and São Paulo-Congonhas Airport both located São Paulo. Additioanally, GOL mainstain secondary hubs at Rio de Janeiro–Galeão International Airport and Brasilia International Airport. GOL also has focus operations at Rio de Janeiro-Santos Dumont Airport, Salvador Bahia Airport, Fortaleza Airport and Belo Horizonte International Airport. GOL refers to itself as GOL Intelligent Airlines (GOL Linhas Aéreas Inteligentes in Portuguese) as a slogan. The company was traded on the New York Stock Exchange as "GOL Linhas Aéreas Inteligentes S.A." from 2004 to 2024. On April 1, 2026, Gol Linhas Aéreas SA incorporated Gol Linhas Aéreas Inteligentes SA. The latter ceased to exist being replaced by the former.

The company's name is a Portuguese word borrowing from the English word "goal" from association football. The company slogan is Nova GOL. Novos tempos no ar. (in Brazilian Portuguese); New GOL. New times in the air. (in English).

It is informed that the debt of company until final July 2024 totals R$29.1 billion.

== History ==
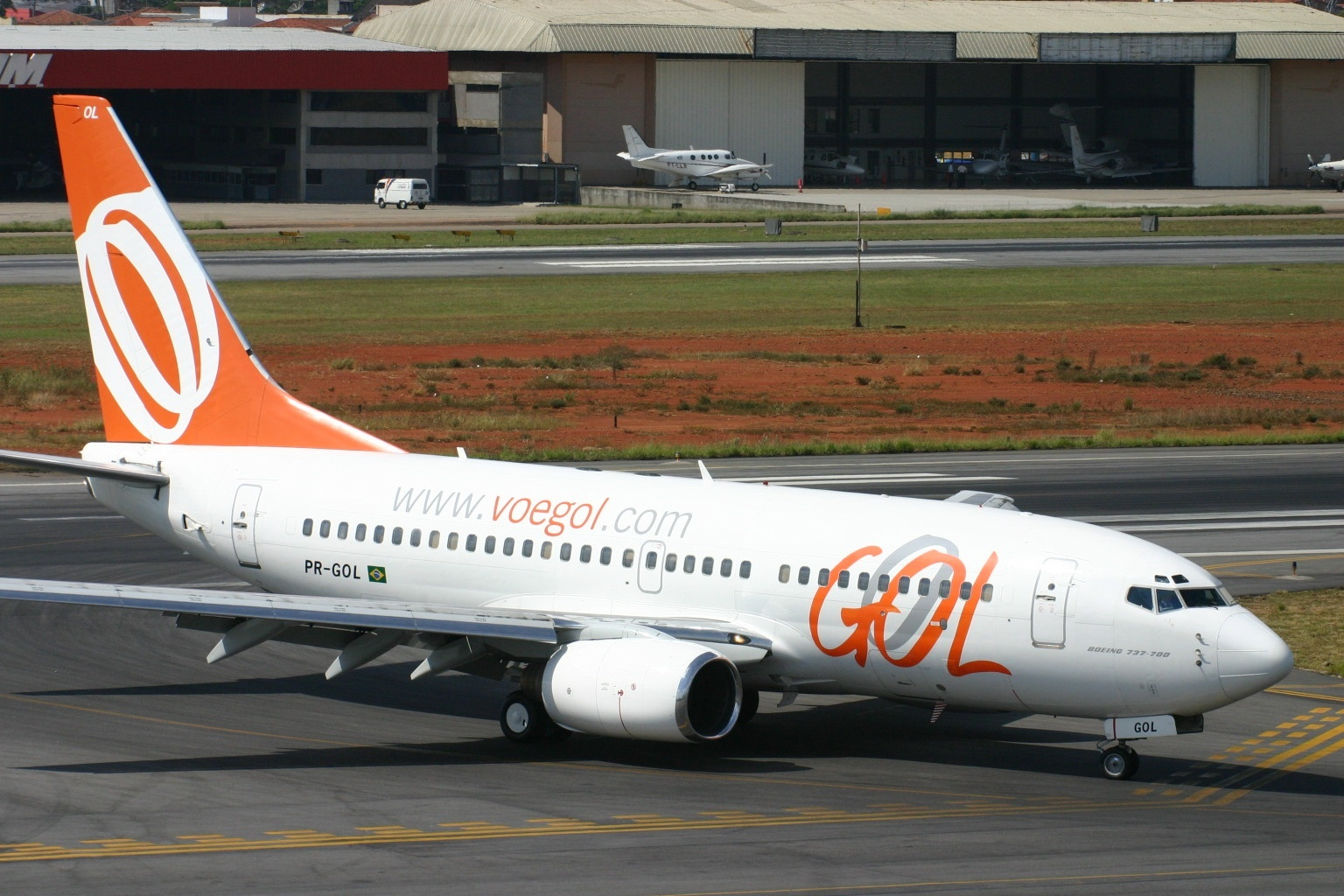
The Boeing 737-700 airplane used in GOL's second commercial flight, showing the company's brand

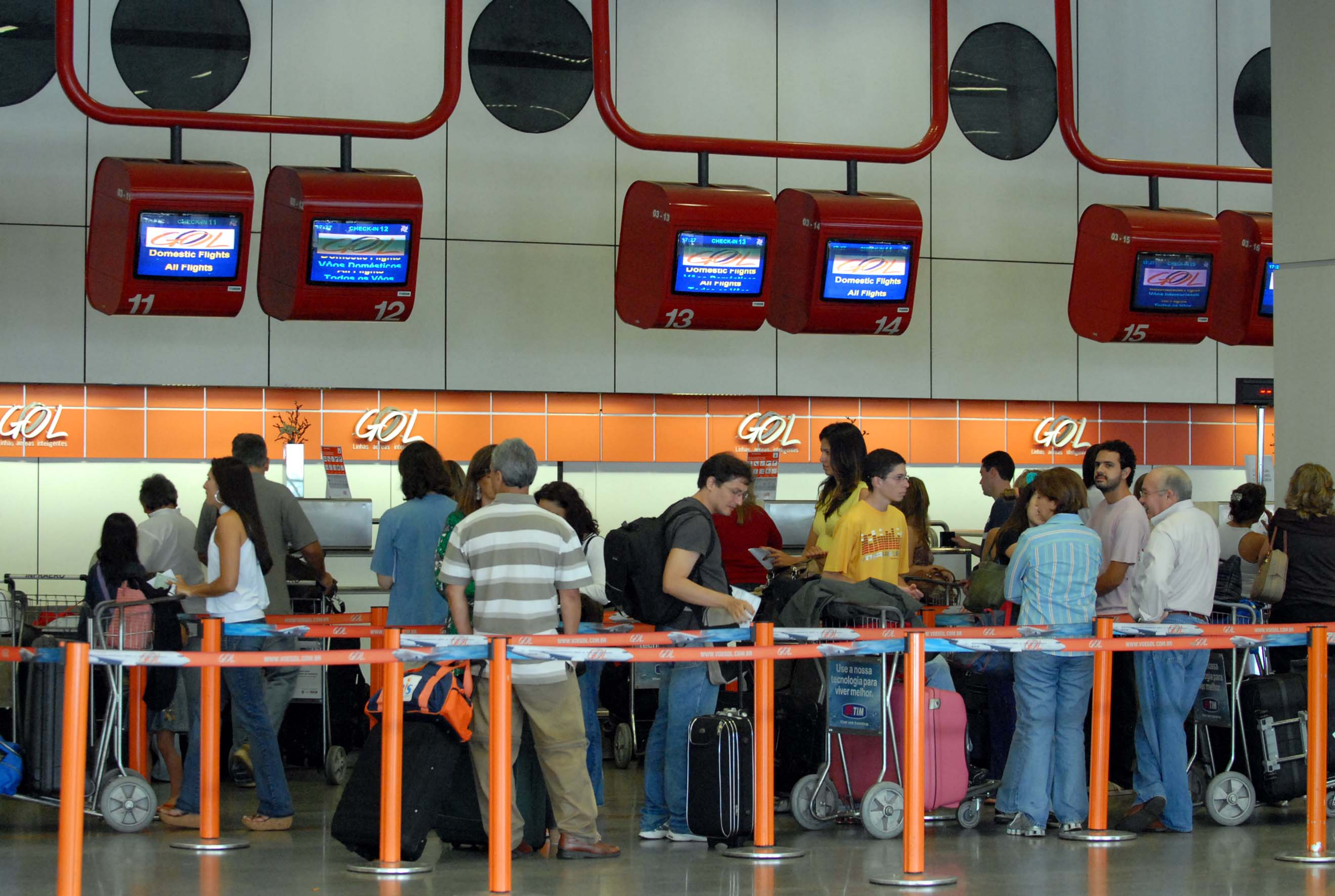
GOL ticket counter at Brasilia International Airport

The airline was established in 2000 as GOL Transportes Aéreos S.A. and started operations on 15 January 2001 with a flight from Brasília to São Paulo. It is a subsidiary of the Brazilian conglomerate Grupo Áurea, based in Minas Gerais state, which has other transportation interests, including Brazil's largest long-distance bus company. Grupo Áurea in turn is owned by the Constantino family. Constantino Júnior was responsible for building the business next to the vice president of the company, David Barioni.

In 2007, GOL was owned by AeroPar Participações (75.5%), Venture (17.6%), American International Group (5.4%) and Air France-KLM (1.5%). The growth in GOL's stock price made the Constantino family a member of the Forbes magazine billionaire list in 2005.

In 2007, GOL was supposed to begin a code-share agreement with TAP Portugal, opening the European market to the Brazilian airline, and the internal Brazilian market to the Portuguese airline (the largest foreign airline in Brazil). Instead, TAP Portugal chose to cooperate with TAM Airlines.

On 24 February 2010, GOL announced it was in "advanced talks" to join the Oneworld alliance, which would allow it to catch up with rival TAM, a recent member of Star Alliance. However, on 6 October 2010, the airline announced a change in position by denying any interest in joining an alliance, preferring to remain independent and to establish a "patchwork of code-sharing agreements.". Following this trend, on 28 September 2011, GOL and Aerolíneas Argentinas announced the intention to implement a codeshare, feeder and frequent flyer programs agreement on a date yet to be announced and pending approval from the governments of Brazil and Argentina.

On 18 March 2010, GOL unveiled the expansion of its maintenance base located at Belo Horizonte/Confins - Tancredo Neves International Airport. Originally opened in 2006 with the capacity to service 60 aircraft per year (mainly Boeing 737 and 767), the expansion allowed GOL to increase the number to 120. GOL later started also using the base to service aircraft from other airlines, and as of 2013, it also serviced airplanes from Azul Brazilian Airlines and Copa Airlines.

On 23 December 2010, GOL Airlines started an operational partnership with Brazilian carrier Passaredo Linhas Aéreas. The agreement was rescinded on 31 July 2014, when Passaredo established a similar interline agreement with TAM Airlines instead.

On 7 December 2011, GOL announced the intention of Delta Air Lines to purchase 3% of its shares. The agreement also includes the creation of mutual code-share flights, alignment of frequent flyer benefits and transfer of GOL's Boeing 767s lease agreements to Delta.

On 1 October 2012, GOL confirmed a firm order of 60 Boeing 737 MAXs. References did not specify the type of MAX aircraft.

On 6 October 2012, GOL started seasonal operations at Miami and Orlando, which are available for Smiles account holders and originated in Brazil only. Technically, they are considered charter flights, although they are not necessarily part of an inclusive tour package; the use of miles or miles plus money is mandatory, as well as a minimum 7-day stay at the destination.

In February 2014, Air France–KLM announced it would invest $100 million in GOL Linhas Aéreas Inteligentes in advance of the 2014 FIFA World Cup and the 2016 Olympics.

Some disagreement exists about whether GOL is a low-cost carrier. In 2014, GOL was ranked the second-best low-cost airline in South America after Azul. GOL refers to itself as a low-cost carrier, but it is increasingly not regarded as such. According to UFRJ specialist Elton Fernandes, "GOL's costs are not very different from those of TAM Airlines. People are accustomed to calling GOL low-cost, but GOL is not that. It is not even low-fare anymore.".

On 26 September 2019, Delta announced that it will exit its minority stake in GOL, following Delta acquiring 20% stake of LATAM Airlines Group.

On 11 May 2022, it was announced that GOL would merge with Avianca to form the Abra Group, which would own both companies.

Celso Ferrer became the CEO of the Brazilian airline 1 July 2022.

In March 2023, GOL reduced frequencies in Fortaleza as well as cancelled the Fortaleza airline's hub.

In January 2024, GOL prepared to file for Chapter 11 bankruptcy, stating that the airline has been struggling with high debt and recently hired Seabury Capital to help it in a broad capital structure review. As a result, the company's shares tumbled as much as 13% or 27% at Ibovespa. On 24 January 2024, GOL sought US$950 million in financing to fund itself during its bankruptcy procedures. On 25 January 2024, GOL declared Chapter 11 bankruptcy in New York to bounce back from high debt costs caused by the COVID-19 pandemic. During the bankruptcy procedure, GOL continued to operate. GOL declared more than US$8.3 billion in debt as well as a summe of more than R$40 billion. Following, Fitch, S&P and Moody downgraded GOL's rating, GOL lied and owes more than R$1.1 billion to the Air Force and admitted it did not paid air navigation fees in Brazil and GOL (GOLL4) studied measures against LATAM for trying to take over planes. According to GOL's lawyers, LATAM had sent letters to the lessors. The Debt with Workers is more than R$1.3 billion. R$420 million in judicial processes in Brazil. Banco do Brasil and Bradesco questioned GOL's DIP Financing guarantees.

In June 2025, Gol exited its bankruptcy with plans to introduce new routes and add more Boeing planes to its fleet.

On April 1, 2026, Gol Linhas Aéreas SA incorporated Gol Linhas Aéreas Inteligentes SA and Gol Investment Brasil SA. The latter 2 entities ceased to exist being replaced by the former.

=== Purchase of Varig ===
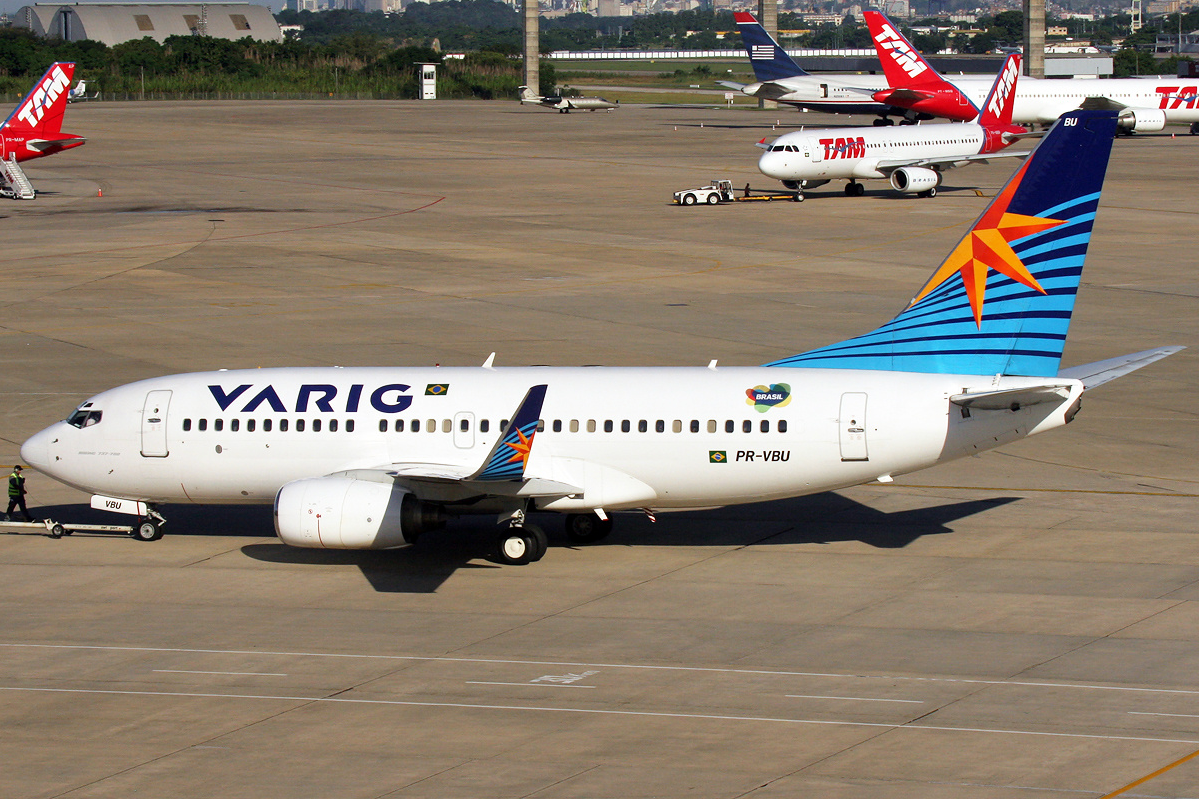
Varig Boeing 737-700

On 28 March 2007, GOL officially purchased part of the assets of VARIG - VRG Linhas Aéreas, informally known as the "new Varig," a new company that owned the Varig brand, for US$320 million from Volo Group and MatlinPatterson Global Opportunities hedge fund. At that time, the "old Varig" was under bankruptcy protection. GOL Linhas Aereas Inteligentes SA posted a first-quarter loss of 3.5 million Reais (2 million US dollars) after revenues of 1.6 billion Reais (one billion US dollars).

GOL announced that the Varig brand would continue doing business operating as such, rather than its official name VRG Linhas Aéreas. The transaction, via its GTI subsidiary, required a US$98 million cash payment, with the balance through the allocation of non-voting shares to VARIG Logística and Volo, which had acquired VARIG in June 2006 for US$24 million. The transaction did not involve the original airline, informally known as "old Varig," which continued to exist until its bankruptcy in mid-2010 under the name Flex Linhas Aéreas.

In 2009, GOL was merged into VRG Linhas Aéreas. VRG Linhas Aéreas thus became an airline that operates two brands: GOL and Varig, although in reality flights are operated only under GOL flight numbers. Initially, the Varig brand operated to medium-haul scheduled and charter international destinations within South America and to the Caribbean with Boeing 737-700s configured in two classes, and to long-haul charter international destinations in North America, Europe and Africa with Boeing 767-300ERs configured in economy only. The latter was also used in wet-lease operations. This scheme was later dropped. The brand GOL operates most of the flights of the network and has aircraft configured in all-economy class, used for scheduled domestic and international operations within South America.

Because of contractual obligations, between 2006 and 2009 the "new Varig" (VRG Linhas Aéreas) was obliged to purchase a minimum of 140 hours/month of services from the "old Varig" (Flex Linhas Aéreas). Therefore, at that time, some of VRG Linhas Aéreas flights operated with GOL flight numbers but were actually flown with chartered aircraft from Flex Linhas Aéreas. The agreement ceased before the bankruptcy of Flex on 20 August 2010.

=== Purchase of Webjet Linhas Aéreas ===
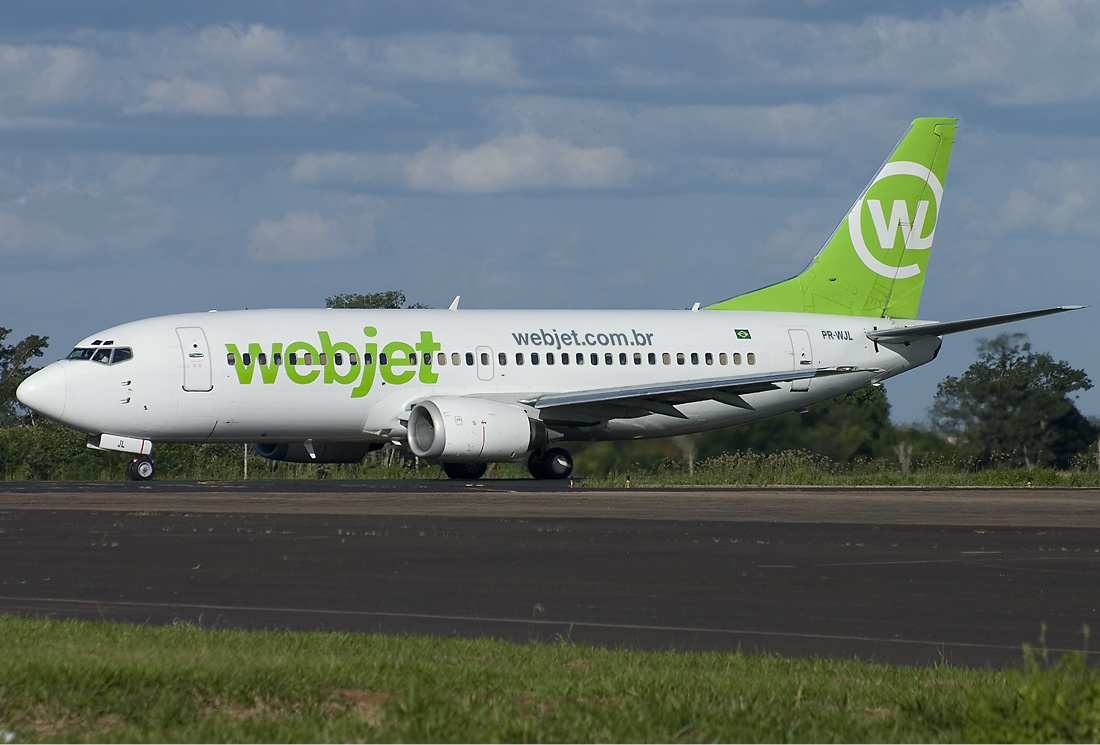
WebJet Linhas Aereas Boeing 737-300

On 9 July 2011, VRG Linhas Aéreas, owner of the brands GOL and Varig, announced the intention to purchase full control of WebJet Linhas Aéreas. The purchase contract was signed on 2 August 2011. On 10 October 2012, the purchase received its final approval with some operational restrictions from the Brazilian regulatory agency. Services were integrated but both companies continued to operate independently for some weeks. Integration started on 17 October 2012 when sales requested via Webjet's web-portal started to be redirected to GOL's site. However, on 23 November 2012, Webjet abruptly ceased to operate and all services were incorporated by GOL. The Webjet brand ceased to exist. GOL also announced its intention to return all of Webjet's Boeing 737-300s to lessors until the end of the first quarter of 2013. There was no mention to the fate of Webjet's 737-800s.

=== Partnership with TwoFlex ===
On 12 April 2019, GOL announced an adapted Essential Air Service partnership with TwoFlex in which the latter would operate feeder services on behalf of GOL in the States of Amazonas, Pará and Mato Grosso using the Cessna 208 Caravan. The flights are marketed by GOL in its reservation platform but operated by TwoFlex and integrated into the network of GOL. This partnership greatly increased the number of GOL destinations in these three States. However, on 14 January 2020, Azul Brazilian Airlines signed an agreement to purchase Twoflex. On 27 March 2020, the Brazilian regulatory bodies gave the nihil obstat to the purchase and sale of flights started on 14 April 2020 thus ending the partnership.

=== Purchase of MAP Linhas Aéreas ===
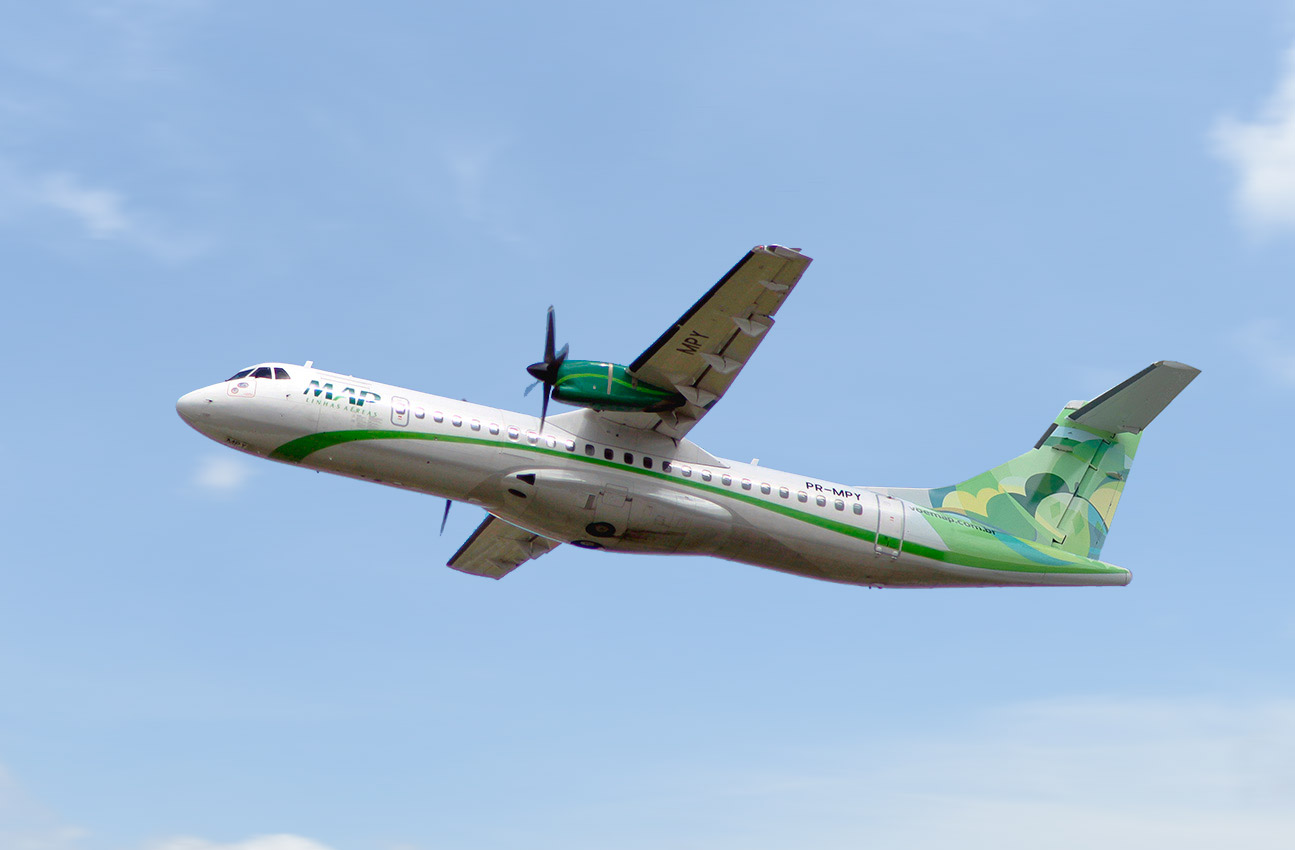
MAP ATR 72

On 8 June 2021, GOL Linhas Aéreas announced the purchase of MAP Linhas Aéreas from Voepass Linhas Aéreas. The transaction included 26 slots at São Paulo–Congonhas Airport belonging to MAP and Voepass. MAP's Amazonian operations and much of its fleet would be transferred to Voepass.

=== Operational agreement with Voepass ===
Between August 2021 and May 2023, GOL and Voepass had an operational agreement in which the latter operated certain routes for the former.

== Corporate affairs ==
The key trends for GOL are (as of the financial year ending 31 December):

	Revenue (R$ b)	Net profit (R$ b)	Number of employees (FTE)	Number of passengers (m)	Passenger load factor (%)	Total number of aircraft	References
2010	6.9	0.21	17,963	28.4	63.6	125	
2011	7.5	−0.75	18,776	32.9	66.7	150	
2012	8.1	−1.5	17,726	39.1	70.2	148	
2013	8.9	−0.72	16,319	36.3	69.9	150	
2014	10.0	−1.1	16,875	39.7	76.9	144	
2015	9.7	−4.2	16,472	38.8	77.2	144	
2016	9.7	1.1	15,261	32.6	77.5	130	
2017	10.3	0.37	14,532	32.5	80.1	119	
2018	11.4	−0.77	15,259	33.4	80.0	121	
2019	13.8	0.17	16,113	36.4	82.0	137	
2020	6.3	−5.9	13,899	16.7	80.1	127	
2021	7.4	−7.1	13,969	18.8	82.0	135	
2022	15.1	−1.5	14,048	27.2	80.0	146	
2023	18.7	−1.2	13,837	30.8	82.0	141	

== Destinations ==
As of October 2025, GOL Linhas Aéreas Inteligentes serves the following destinations:

Country	City	Airport	Notes	Refs.
Argentina	Bariloche	Teniente Luis Candelaria Airport	Terminated	
Argentina	Buenos Aires	Aeroparque Jorge Newbery		
Argentina	Buenos Aires	Ministro Pistarini International Airport		
Argentina	Córdoba	Ingeniero Aeronáutico Ambrosio L.V. Taravella International Airport		
Argentina	Mendoza	Governor Francisco Gabrielli International Airport		
Argentina	Rosario	Islas Malvinas International Airport		
Aruba	Oranjestad	Queen Beatrix International Airport		
Barbados	Bridgetown	Grantley Adams International Airport	Terminated	
Bolivia	Santa Cruz de la Sierra	Viru Viru International Airport		
Brazil	Altamira	Altamira Airport	Terminated	
Brazil	Aracaju	Santa Maria Airport		
Brazil	Araçatuba	Araçatuba Airport		
Brazil	Araguaína	Araguaína Airport	Terminated; Operated by Voepass	
Brazil	Barreiras	Barreiras Airport	Terminated; Operated by Voepass	
Brazil	Bauru	Bauru Airport	Terminated	
Brazil	Belém	Val de Cans International Airport	Focus city	
Brazil	Belo Horizonte	Pampulha – Carlos Drummond de Andrade Airport	Terminated	
Brazil	Belo Horizonte	Tancredo Neves International Airport		
Brazil	Boa Vista	Boa Vista International Airport		
Brazil	Bonito	Bonito Airport		
Brazil	Brasília	Brasília International Airport	Hub	
Brazil	Cabo Frio	Cabo Frio International Airport	Terminated	
Brazil	Caldas Novas	Caldas Novas Airport		
Brazil	Campina Grande	Campina Grande Airport		
Brazil	Campinas	Viracopos International Airport		
Brazil	Campo Grande	Campo Grande International Airport		
Brazil	Carajás (Parauapebas)	Carajás Airport		
Brazil	Cascavel	Regional West Airport		
Brazil	Caxias do Sul	Hugo Cantergiani Regional Airport		
Brazil	Chapecó	Serafin Enoss Bertaso Airport		
Brazil	Cruzeiro do Sul	Cruzeiro do Sul International Airport		
Brazil	Cuiabá	Marechal Rondon International Airport		
Brazil	Curitiba	Afonso Pena International Airport		
Brazil	Dourados	Francisco de Matos Pereira Airport	Terminated	
Brazil	Fernando de Noronha	Fernando de Noronha Airport	Terminated	
Brazil	Florianópolis	Hercílio Luz International Airport		
Brazil	Fortaleza	Pinto Martins – Fortaleza International Airport		
Brazil	Foz do Iguaçu	Foz do Iguaçu International Airport		
Brazil	Goiânia	Santa Genoveva Airport		
Brazil	Ilhéus	Ilhéus Jorge Amado Airport		
Brazil	Imperatriz	Imperatriz Airport	Terminated	
Brazil	Ipatinga	Vale do Aço Regional Airport	Terminated; Operated by Voepass	
Brazil	Jericoacoara	Comte. Ariston Pessoa Regional Airport		
Brazil	João Pessoa	Presidente Castro Pinto International Airport		
Brazil	Joinville	Joinville-Lauro Carneiro de Loyola Airport		
Brazil	Juazeiro do Norte	Orlando Bezerra de Menezes Airport		
Brazil	Juiz de Fora	Zona da Mata Regional Airport		
Brazil	Lençóis	Coronel Horácio de Mattos Airport	Terminated; Operated by Voepass	
Brazil	Londrina	Londrina Airport		
Brazil	Macapá	Macapá International Airport		
Brazil	Maceió	Zumbi dos Palmares International Airport		
Brazil	Manaus	Eduardo Gomes International Airport	Focus city	
Brazil	Marabá	Marabá Airport		
Brazil	Maringá	Maringá Regional Airport		
Brazil	Montes Claros	Montes Claros Airport		
Brazil	Natal	Augusto Severo International Airport	Airport Closed	
Brazil	Natal	Governador Aluízio Alves International Airport		
Brazil	Navegantes	Ministro Victor Konder International Airport		
Brazil	Palmas	Palmas Airport		
Brazil	Passo Fundo	Lauro Kurtz Airport		
Brazil	Paulo Afonso	Paulo Afonso Airport	Terminated; Operated by Voepass	
Brazil	Pelotas	Pelotas International Airport		
Brazil	Petrolina	Petrolina Airport		
Brazil	Porto Alegre	Salgado Filho International Airport		
Brazil	Porto Seguro	Porto Seguro Airport		
Brazil	Porto Velho	Governador Jorge Teixeira de Oliveira International Airport		
Brazil	Presidente Prudente	Presidente Prudente Airport		
Brazil	Recife	Guararapes–Gilberto Freyre International Airport		
Brazil	Ribeirão Preto	Leite Lopes Airport		
Brazil	Rio Branco	Rio Branco International Airport		
Brazil	Rio de Janeiro	Rio de Janeiro–Galeão International Airport	Focus city	
Brazil	Rio de Janeiro	Santos Dumont Airport		
Brazil	Rio Verde	Gal. Leite de Castro Airport	Terminated	
Brazil	Rondonópolis	Maestro Marinho Franco Airport	Terminated; Operated by Voepass	
Brazil	Salvador da Bahia	Deputado Luís Eduardo Magalhães International Airport	Hub	
Brazil	Santa Maria	Santa Maria Airport	Terminated; Operated by Voepass	
Brazil	Santarém	Santarém-Maestro Wilson Fonseca Airport		
Brazil	Santo Ângelo	Sepé Tiaraju Airport		
Brazil	São José dos Campos	São José dos Campos Airport		
Brazil	São José do Rio Preto	Prof. Eribelto Manoel Reino Airport		
Brazil	São Luís	Marechal Cunha Machado International Airport		
Brazil	São Paulo	São Paulo–Congonhas Airport	Hub	
Brazil	São Paulo	São Paulo/Guarulhos International Airport	Hub	
Brazil	Sinop	Sinop Airport		
Brazil	Sorriso	Adolino Bedin Airport	Terminated; Operated by Voepass	
Brazil	Teresina	Teresina Airport		
Brazil	Teixeira de Freitas	9 de maio Airport	Terminated; Operated by Voepass	
Brazil	Uberaba	Uberaba Airport		
Brazil	Uberlândia	Uberlândia Airport		
Brazil	Uruguaiana	Ruben Berta International Airport	Terminated; Operated by Voepass	
Brazil	Vitória	Eurico de Aguiar Salles Airport		
Brazil	Vitória da Conquista	Pedro Otacílio Figueiredo Airport	Airport Closed	
Brazil	Vitória da Conquista	Glauber Rocha Airport		
Chile	Santiago	Arturo Merino Benítez International Airport	Terminated	
Colombia	Bogotá	El Dorado International Airport		
Costa Rica	San José	Juan Santamaría International Airport	Terminated	
Curaçao	Willemstad	Curaçao International Airport	Terminated	
Dominican Republic	La Romana	La Romana International Airport	Terminated	
Dominican Republic	Punta Cana	Punta Cana International Airport		
Dominican Republic	Santo Domingo	Las Américas International Airport	Terminated	
Ecuador	Quito	Mariscal Sucre International Airport	Terminated	
France	Paris	Charles de Gaulle Airport	Begins Q4 2026	
Mexico	Cancún	Cancún International Airport	Terminated	
Paraguay	Asunción	Silvio Pettirossi International Airport		
Perú	Lima	Jorge Chávez International Airport	Terminated	
Portugal	Lisbon	Lisbon Airport		
Suriname	Paramaribo	Johan Adolf Pengel International Airport		
Trinidad and Tobago	Scarborough	Arthur Napoleon Raymond Robinson International Airport	Terminated	
United States	Fort Lauderdale	Fort Lauderdale–Hollywood International Airport	Terminated	
United States	Miami	Miami International Airport		
United States	New York City	John F. Kennedy International Airport		
United States	Orlando	Orlando International Airport		
Uruguay	Montevideo	Carrasco/General Cesáreo L. Berisso International Airport		
Uruguay	Punta del Este	Capitán de Corbeta Carlos A. Curbelo International Airport	Terminated	
Venezuela	Caracas	Simón Bolívar International Airport		

Additionally, GOL operates dedicated executive bus services between São Paulo airports for its passengers and affiliate airlines:

- São Paulo–Congonhas Airport and São Paulo/Guarulhos International Airport

=== Codeshare agreements ===
GOL has codeshare agreements with the following airlines:

- Abaeté Aviação
- Aerolíneas Argentinas
- Aeroméxico
- Air Canada
- Air France
- American Airlines
- Avianca
- Copa Airlines
- KLM
- Royal Air Maroc
- South African Airways
- TAAG Angola Airlines
- Turkish Airlines

== Fleet ==
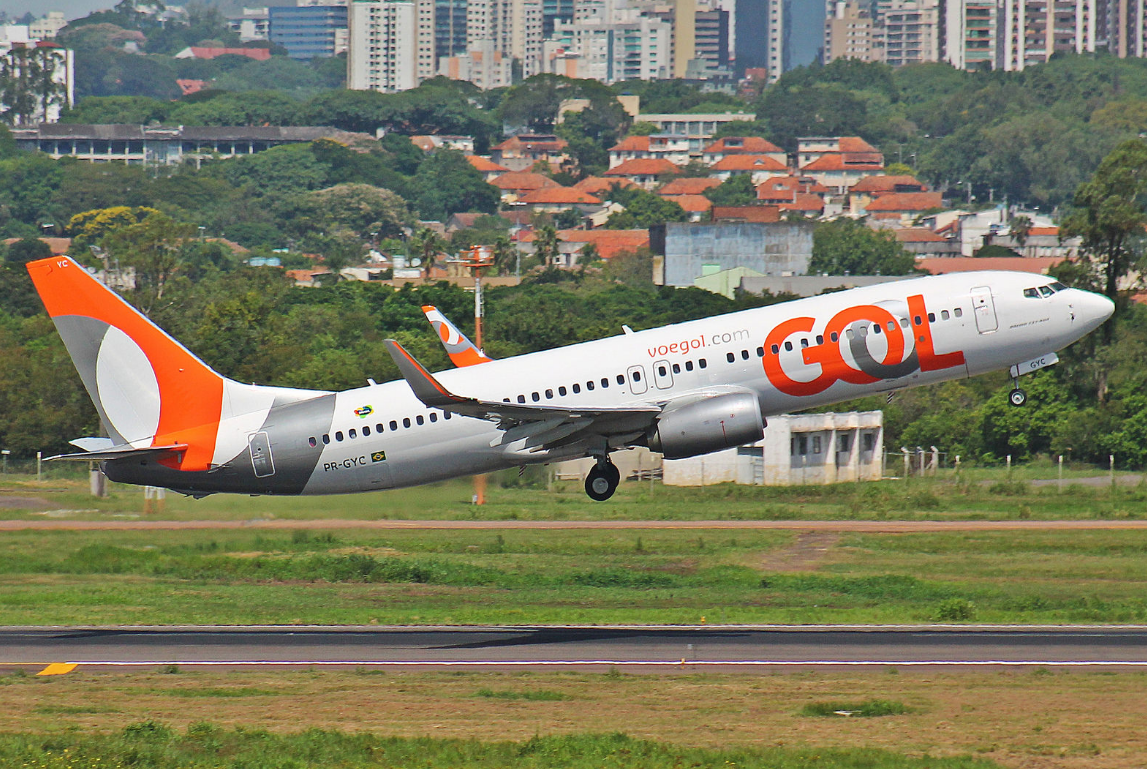
GOL Boeing 737-800

=== Current fleet ===
GOL operated an all-Boeing 737 fleet until 2026, when it ordered five Airbus A330-900:

GOL fleet
Aircraft	In service	Orders	Passengers	Notes
Airbus A330-900	—	5	TBA	Deliveries from 2026 until 2027. To be inherited from Azul Brazilian Airlines.
Boeing 737-700	12	—	138	
Boeing 737-800	65	—	186	One crashed as Flight 1907.
Boeing 737 MAX 8	59	44	186	PR-XMR in sustainability livery.
Boeing 737 MAX 10	—	30	TBA	Orders convertible to the smaller 737 MAX 8 or 737 MAX 9 if GOL is uncertain of 737 MAX 10 type certification.
GOL Cargo fleet
Boeing 737-800BCF	9	—	Cargo	
Total	145	79		

== Airline affinity program ==
Smiles is GOL/Varig's Frequent-flyer program since 20 July 2006. Points can be used for services from GOL/Varig, and partners Aerolíneas Argentinas, Aeromexico, Air Canada, Air Europa, Air France, Alitalia, American Airlines, Avianca, British Airways, Copa Airlines, Emirates, Etihad, Iberia, KLM, Qatar Airways and TAP Air Portugal, including flights, upgrades, holidays, hotel stays and car rentals. Smiles was part of the "new Varig" package bought by GOL, which honored all miles and eventually became its own frequent-flyer program. Previously GOL had no such program.

On a study conducted in 2011, Smiles ranked third among 24 chosen frequent flyer programs, with 97.1% success of requests made.

In 2013, Smiles was spun off as an independent company eventually leading to its IPO at BOVESPA in April 2013.

== Accidents and incidents ==
- On 29 September 2006, Flight 1907 operated by a Boeing 737-800 SFP (Short Field Performance) registered as PR-GTD disappeared from radar while flying over the central-western state of Mato Grosso en route from Manaus to Brasília and Rio de Janeiro-Galeão. The aircraft collided in mid-air with an Embraer Legacy 600 business jet registered N600XL, near the town of Matupá, 470 miles (760 km) south of Manaus. The GOL aircraft broke up in mid-air and crashed in the Amazon rainforest, leaving no survivors among its 154 occupants. The wreckage was found a day later. The Legacy jet landed safely at Cachimbo Airport, part of the Brigadeiro Velloso Test Range of the Brazilian Air Force, with damage to the tail and left winglet. As of 2026, Flight 1907 is the only fatal accident in the airline's history.
- On 29 April 2022, a GOL Linhas Aéreas Boeing 737 registered as PR-GUQ collided with an Azul Brazilian Airlines Embraer E195 while taxiing at Viracopos International Airport after landing from Santos Dumont Airport. Nobody was injured, with damage only caused to the 737's left winglet and the E195's tailcone.
- On 11 February 2025, Gol Transportes Aéreos Flight 1674, operated by a Boeing 737 MAX 8 registered as PS-GPP, collided with a maintenance vehicle while accelerating for takeoff at Rio de Janeiro/Galeão International Airport. The aircraft aborted takeoff and came to a standstill; all passengers disembarked normally and no injuries were reported.

== See also ==
- List of airlines of Brazil
