= Patos de Minas Airport =

Pedro Pereira dos Santos Airport Aeroporto Pedro Pereira dos Santos
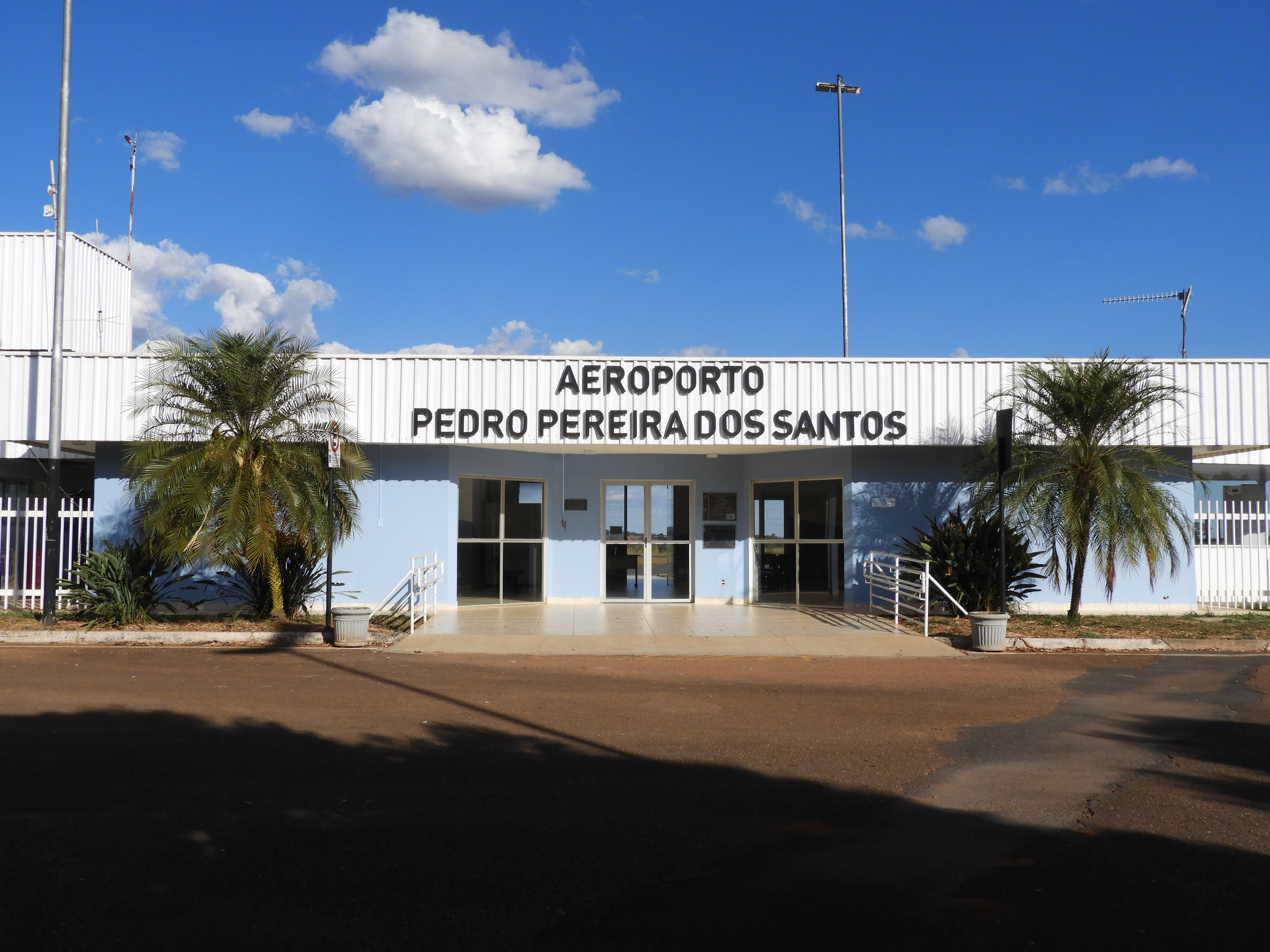
- IATA: POJ; ICAO: SNPD; LID: MG0010

Summary
- Airport type: Public
- Serves: Patos de Minas
- Time zone: BRT (UTC−03:00)
- Elevation AMSL: 852 m (2,795 ft)
- Coordinates: 18°40′20″S 046°29′29″W

Map
- Location in Brazil POJ (Brazil)

Runways
Direction	Length		Surface
Direction	m	ft	Surface
09/27	1,700	5,578	Asphalt
- Sources: ANAC, DECEA

Pedro Pereira dos Santos Airport (IATA: POJ, ICAO: SNPD) is the airport serving Patos de Minas, Brazil.

== History ==
On March 7, 2012, because of safety concerns, the National Civil Aviation Agency of Brazil (ANAC) imposed operational restrictions related to scheduled flights on the airport until irregularities are solved. General aviation operations were not affected.

== Airlines and destinations ==
Airlines	Destinations
Azul Brazilian Airlines	Belo Horizonte–Confins

== Access ==
The airport is located 13 km (8 mi) from downtown Patos de Minas.

== See also ==
- List of airports in Brazil
