= Pedro Otacílio Figueiredo Airport =

Former airport serving Vitória da Conquista, Brazil

Pedro Otacílio Figueiredo Airport Aeroporto Pedro Otacílio Figueiredo
- IATA: ~~VDC~~; ICAO: ~~SBQV~~

Summary
- Airport type: Defunct
- Serves: Vitória da Conquista
- Closed: July 23, 2019
- Elevation AMSL: 915 m (3,002 ft)
- Coordinates: 14°51′49″S 040°51′47″W

Map
- Location in Brazil

Runways
Direction	Length		Surface
Direction	m	ft	Surface
~~15/33~~	~~1,775~~	~~5,823~~	~~Asphalt~~ (closed)
- Sources: World Aero Data, ANAC^{*}IATA code VDC was transferred to Glauber Rocha Airport.

Pedro Otacílio Figueiredo Airport ~~(IATA: VDC, ICAO: SBQV)~~ was the airport that served Vitória da Conquista, Brazil.

== History ==
The airport was operated by Socicam between 2008 and 2019. The facility was decommissioned on July 23, 2019.

The following airlines once served the airport: Azul Brazilian Airlines, Gol Transportes Aéreos, Voepass.

== Accidents and incidents ==
- 6 March 1955: a Real Transportes Aéreos Douglas DC-3/C-53-D-DO registration PP-YPZ crashed during approach to land at Vitória da Conquista. The landing gear was lowered but the undercarriage did not lock. The pilot made an overshoot and during a turn to the left the aircraft struck a pole, crashed and caught fire. Of the 21 passengers and crew aboard, 5 died.
- 9 October 1985: a Nordeste Embraer EMB110C Bandeirante registration PT-GKA operating a cargo flight from Vitória da Conquista to Salvador da Bahia crashed during initial climb from Vitória da Conquista after flying unusually low. The two crew members died.

== Access ==
The airport was located 3 km (2 mi) from downtown Vitória da Conquista.
