= Glauber Rocha Airport =

Glauber Rocha Airport Aeroporto Glauber Rocha
- IATA: VDC; ICAO: SBVC; LID: BA0005

Summary
- Airport type: Public
- Operator: Socicam
- Serves: Vitória da Conquista
- Opened: July 25, 2019
- Time zone: BRT (UTC−03:00)
- Elevation AMSL: 894 m (2,933 ft)
- Coordinates: 14°54′28″S 040°54′53″W
- Website: conquista-aero.com.br

Map
- Location in Brazil

Runways
Direction	Length		Surface
Direction	m	ft	Surface
15/33	2,100	6,890	Asphalt

Statistics (2025)
- Passengers: 402,177 ▼2%
- Statistics: Secretaria de Turismo; Sources: Website, ANAC, DECEA

Glauber Rocha Airport (IATA: VDC, ICAO: SBVC) is the airport serving Vitória da Conquista, Brazil. It was named after the Brazilian Film Director Glauber de Andrade Rocha, who was born in Vitória da Conquista.

It is managed by Socicam.

== History ==
The airport opened on July 25, 2019. It replaced the former airport of Vitória da Conquista, Pedro Otacílio Figueiredo Airport.

== Airlines and destinations ==
Airlines	Destinations
Azul Brazilian Airlines	Belo Horizonte–Confins, Salvador da Bahia
Gol Linhas Aéreas	São Paulo–Guarulhos, Salvador da Bahia
LATAM Brasil	São Paulo–Guarulhos

== Access ==
The airport is located 18 km (11 mi) from downtown Vitória da Conquista.

== See also ==
- List of airports in Brazil
