= SBVC =

SBVC may refer to:

- San Bernardino Valley College, a public community college in San Bernardino, California
- SBVC, the ICAO code for Glauber Rocha Airport, Vitória da Conquista, Brazil
