= Barreiras Airport =

Dom Ricardo Weberberger Airport Aeroporto Dom Ricardo Weberberger
- IATA: BRA; ICAO: SBNR; LID: BA0011

Summary
- Airport type: Public
- Serves: Barreiras
- Time zone: BRT (UTC−03:00)
- Elevation AMSL: 747 m (2,451 ft)
- Coordinates: 12°04′45″S 045°00′34″W

Map
- Location in Brazil

Runways
Direction	Length		Surface
Direction	m	ft	Surface
08/26	1,600	5,249	Asphalt
- Sources: ANAC, DECEA

Dom Ricardo Weberberger Airport (IATA: BRA, ICAO: SBNR) is the airport serving Barreiras, Brazil.

== History ==
The airport was commissioned in 1940 and served as a strategic technical stop on the route Rio de Janeiro-Miami, enabling faster flights as compared with the ones operated via the coast. Furthermore, because of the existence of a river and a railway, fuel was easily transported to the site. During World War II the airport became a United States Air Force Base but after 1945 it returned to its original civil vocation.

== Airlines and destinations ==
Airlines	Destinations
Azul Brazilian Airlines	Belo Horizonte–Confins, Salvador da Bahia

== Access ==
The airport is located 14 km (9 mi) from downtown Barreiras.

== See also ==
- List of airports in Brazil
