= David Barioni =

Brazilian businessman (1958–2025)

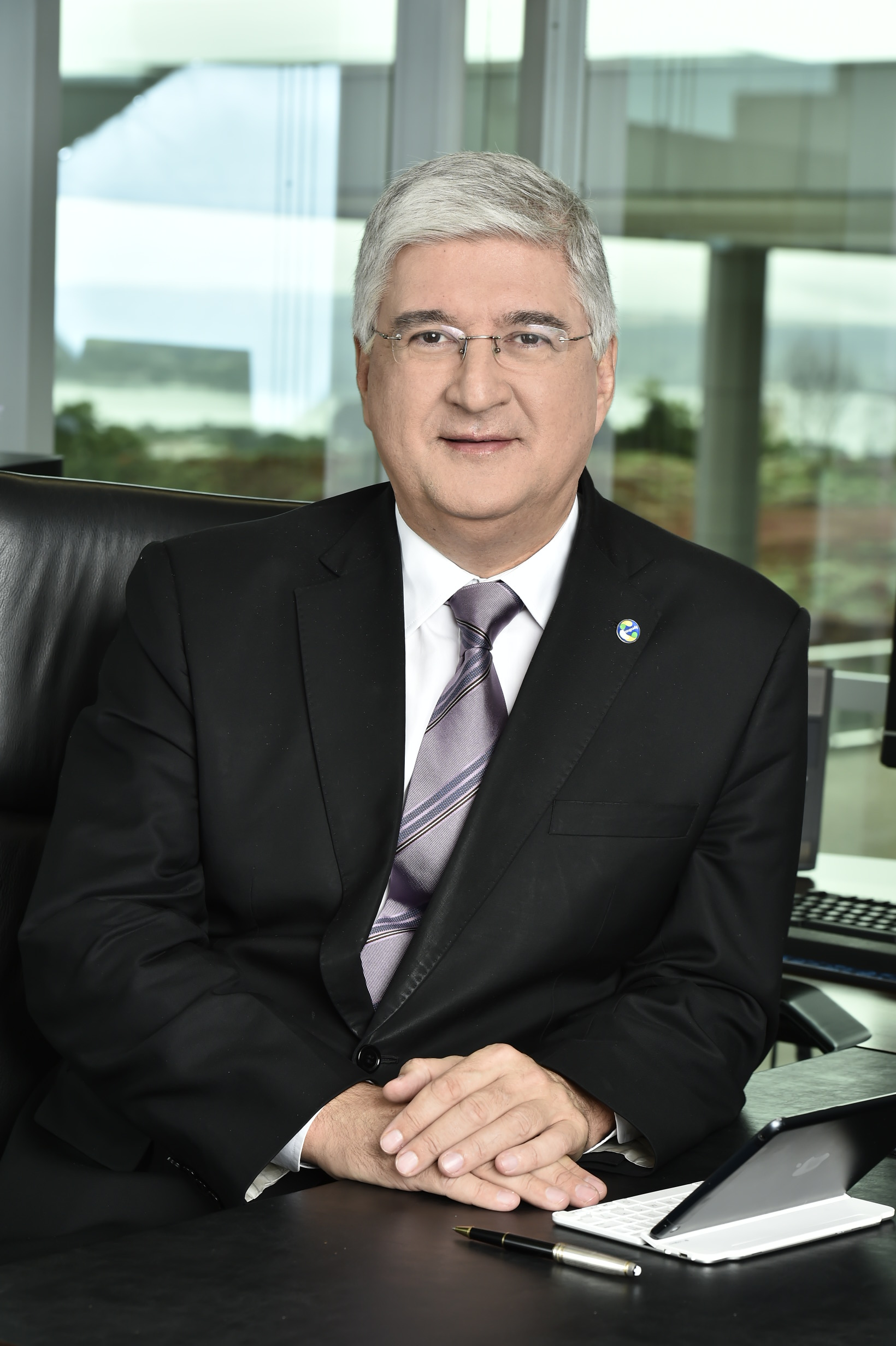
- Born: November 14, 1958; São Paulo, Brazil
- Died: November 25, 2025 (aged 67)
- Occupation: President of Apex-Brasil

David Barioni Neto (November 14, 1958 – November 25, 2025) was a Brazilian businessman. He was CEO (president) of São Paulo Turismo S.A and from August 2018 also Tourism secretary of the city of São Paulo.

Previously, Barioni was CEO of Ageo Terminais Aeroportuários, Apex-Brasil (the Brazilian Trade and Investment Promotion Agency ), Facility Group S.A. and TAM Airlines and also VP of Gol Airlines.

== Career ==
Barioni started his career as a pilot in 1976, at the age of 18. During his career as a pilot, Barioni flew aircraft models such as Boeing 737, MD-11, Boeing 777-300ER and was an Airbus A300 co-pilot.

He was also an instructor and flight security agent accredited by the Center for Investigation and Prevention of Aeronautical Accidents (CENIPA) with a specialization in special cargo and crisis management through International Air Transport Association (IATA). He later graduated with a degree in Business Management through UNIB – Ibirapuera University – SP.

In 1979, Barioni began his career as a co-pilot at VASP (São Paulo Airlines) becoming the company's youngest co-pilot. He later became Commander in 1987.

In 2000, Barioni became vice president of Gol Airlines, a company he helped to build alongside its CEO, Constantino Júnior.

In 2007, he became president of TAM Brazilian Airlines. In his first year in office, the company's gross revenue grew by 10%, compared to the previous year.

In 2009, Barioni left TAM and became counselor and co-host of the TV show called Aprendiz Universitário (The College Apprentice), alongside entrepreneurs João Doria Jr. and Cristiana Arcangeli.

Also in 2010, David Barioni assumed the presidency of the Facility Group, a specialized recruitment consulting firm with branches across Brazil and abroad.

In 2015, he was awarded by President Dilma Rousseff with the official degree of the Rio Branco Order, the highest award in Brazilian diplomacy, which honors individuals, businesses, military corporations, national and foreign civil institutions for their exceptional merits and services.

Also in 2015, he was appointed president of Apex-Brasil, the Brazilian Trade and Investment Promotion Agency, which promotes Brazil's products and services abroad, and attracts foreign investment to Brazil.

He died on November 25, 2025, in São Paulo, a victim of cancer.

=== Other activities ===
- Member of the Consulting Council of the Ayrton Senna Institute (education and technology)
- Counselor of Julio Simões S.A. (logistics)
- Council Member of the Executive MBA Program at Pittsburgh University – South America (education)
- Member of the Superior Strategic Council at FIESP – Industry Federation of the State of São Paulo (retail)
- Independent Counselor of pharmaceutical chain Pague Menos S.A. (retail)
- Member of the Consulting Council at LIDE Master – João Dória Junior Group (communication)
- Member of the Consulting Council at Integral Médica (retail)
- Member of the International Council at Dom Cabral Foundation (education and development)
