= Belo Horizonte International Airport =

Airport in Brazil

Belo Horizonte/Confins–Tancredo Neves International Airport Aeroporto Internacional Belo Horizonte/Confins–Tancredo Neves

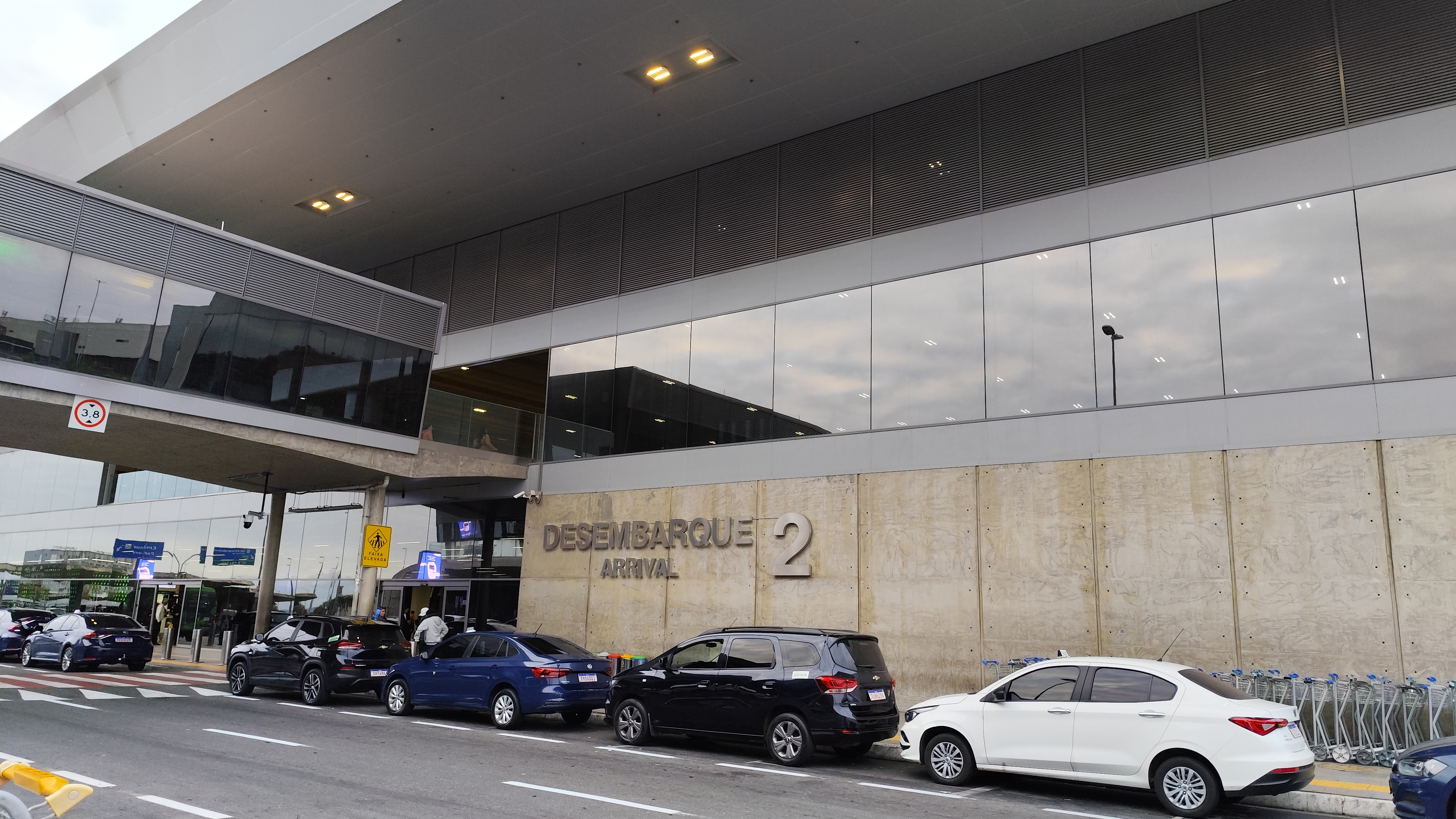
- IATA: CNF; ICAO: SBCF; LID: MG0001

Summary
- Airport type: Public
- Operator: Infraero (1984–2014); BH Airport (2014–present)
- Serves: Belo Horizonte
- Location: Confins, Brazil
- Hub for: Azul Brazilian Airlines
- Focus city for: Gol Transportes Aéreos
- Time zone: BRT (UTC−03:00)
- Elevation AMSL: 829 m (2,720 ft)
- Coordinates: 19°37′28″S 043°58′19″W
- Website: www.bh-airport.com.br/pt-BR

Map
- Location in Brazil CNF (Brazil)

Runways
Direction	Length		Surface
Direction	m	ft	Surface
16/34	3,600	11,811	Asphalt

Statistics (2025)
- Passengers: 13,321,333 ▲8%
- Aircraft operations: 118,306 ▲4%
- Statistics: BH Airport; Sources: Airport Website, ANAC, DECEA

Belo Horizonte/Confins–Tancredo Neves International Airport, formerly called Confins International Airport, (IATA: CNF, ICAO: SBCF) is the primary international airport serving Belo Horizonte, located in the municipality of Confins, in the state of Minas Gerais, Brazil. Since 2 September 1986, the airport is named after Tancredo de Almeida Neves (1910–1985), President-elect of Brazil.

It is operated by BH Airport S.A.

== History ==
The airport was built by Infraero and inaugurated in 1984. Its purpose was to lessen the congestion of the city's original airport, Pampulha Airport, which at the time was operating at 120% of its capacity of 1.3 million passengers per year. It was expected that by 1990, passenger movement at Confins would be nearly 2 million passengers per year. However, it surpassed the 1 million passenger mark only 22 years later. Presently its maximum operational capacity is 22 million passengers per year.

After its inauguration, just a small fraction of the capacity of Confins was used. This was partly due to its distance from downtown Belo Horizonte and, until recently, to the lack of satisfactory transportation alternatives for the pricey (about US$40) taxi rides. The over-crowded Pampulha Airport remained the airport of choice. In order to revert this scenario, in March 2005 the government of the state of Minas Gerais with the support of agencies of the Federal government decided to restrict Pampulha to operations of aircraft with capacity of up to 50 passengers. In the months thereafter, most operations were forced to move to Confins and the airport gained a new momentum. At that time, 130 flights were transferred from Pampulha to Confins, increasing annual passenger flow from 350,000 to around 3.0 million that year.

The problems related to the distance of Confins to downtown Belo Horizonte were lessened by recent projects such as the improvement of the highway that links the city center to the airport (MG-10 highway), part of a larger project called Linha Verde (Green Line), which seeks to reduce the time needed to reach the airport. Another project called the "Industrial Airport" is underway. In this project the government will exempt tax of businesses interested in settling their operations near the airport.

Its cargo facilities have a capacity of handling 18.000 tones (39.682.000 lb) and the warehouse has 6.400 m^{2} (68.889 ft²).

The main maintenance facilities of Gol Airlines are located at this airport.

Responding to critiques to the situation of its airports, on May 18, 2011, Infraero released a list evaluating some of its most important airports according to its saturation levels. According to the list, Confins was considered to be requiring attention, operating between 70% and 85% of its capacity.

=== Recent History ===
On 26 April 2011, it was confirmed that in order to speed-up much needed renovation and upgrade works, private companies would be granted a concession to explore some Infraero airports - among them, in a later phase, Confins. The plan was confirmed on 31 May 2011 and it was added that Infraero would retain 49% of the shares of each privatized airport and that negotiations were expected to be concluded in the first half of 2012.

On 22 November 2013, the Brazilian Government had a bidding process to determine the operator of the airport from 2014 until the next few years. The group Aerobrasil, also known as BH Airport, formed by the Brazilian investment company CCR (75%) and by the Swiss operator Flughafen Zürich AG (25%) won the bid. On April 26, 2025 CCR was rebranded as Motiva.

On 16 September 2015, all international operations were transferred to a new provisional terminal - Terminal 3 while domestic operations remained in Terminal 1.

The construction of Terminal 2 - an extension of Terminal 1 - started in September 2015 and finished in December 2016. It increased the airports capacity to 22 million passengers per year. On 8 December 2016 Terminal 2 was opened for domestic operations and in January 2017 international operations were transferred from Terminal 3. With the transfer of operations, Terminal 3 was closed.

On 31 August 2009, the previous concessionary, Infraero, unveiled a BRL342.3 million (US$180.3 million; EUR126.4 million) investment plan to upgrade Tancredo Neves International Airport, focusing on the preparations for the 2014 FIFA World Cup. The investment was supposed to be distributed as follows:

- Parking. Value 6.8. Completed: July 2010
- Extension of runway, enlargement of apron and cargo terminal, construction of further taxiways. Value 120.0. Completed.
- Renovation of the passenger terminal. Value 215.5.

As of March 2016, only the parking lot and the apron expansion works have been completed. After many successive postponements due to budget cuts and judicial disputes between the airport administration, Infraero, the federal government and the contractors, the lengthening of the runway to 3,600 metres (11,800 ft) was completed in June 2016.

As part of the concession, BH Airport committed itself to construct a new parallel runway with a length of 2,500 metres (8,200 ft), connecting taxiways and service roads as well as a multi-storey car park until 2020.

On November 18, 2025 the entire airports portfolio of Motiva (formerly CCR) was sold to the Mexican airport operator ASUR. Motiva will cease to operate airports. Later, on August 20, 2026, the Swiss operator Flughafen Zürich AG sold its participation on BH Airport to the Mexican airport operator ASUR. As a result, as of August 2026, BH Airport is formed by Asur with 51% and Infraero with 49% of the shares. The transaction with Motiva was completed on August 31, 2026, whereas the one with Flughafen Zürich was still pending government approval.

== Airlines and destinations ==
=== Passenger ===
Airlines	Destinations
Azul Brazilian Airlines	Aracaju, Aracati, Barreiras, Belém, Brasília, Campina Grande, Campinas, Campo Grande, Carajás, Cuiabá, Curitiba, Florianópolis, Fortaleza, Foz do Iguaçu, Goiânia, Governador Valadares, Guanambi, Ilhéus, Imperatriz, Ipatinga, Jericoacoara, João Pessoa, Macapá, Maceió, Manaus, Marabá, Montes Claros, Montevideo, Natal, Orlando, Palmas, Parnaíba, Patos de Minas, Porto Alegre, Porto Seguro, Porto Velho, Recife, Ribeirão Preto, Rio Branco, Rio de Janeiro–Galeão, Rio de Janeiro–Santos Dumont, Salvador da Bahia, Santarém, São José do Rio Preto, São Luís, São Paulo–Congonhas, São Paulo–Guarulhos, Teresina, Uberaba, Uberlândia, Una-Comandatuba, Vitória, Vitória da Conquista; Seasonal: Cabo Frio, Caldas Novas, Curaçao, Fort Lauderdale, Navegantes, Punta del Este (begins 14 December 2026), San Carlos de Bariloche
Azul Conecta	Araxá, Diamantina, Divinópolis, Linhares, Manhuaçu, Paracatu, Rio de Janeiro–Jacarepaguá, São João del-Rei, Varginha; Seasonal: Angra dos Reis (begins 6 February 2027)
Copa Airlines	Panama City–Tocumen
Gol Linhas Aéreas	Brasília, Buenos Aires–Aeroparque, Carajás, Maceió, Porto Seguro, Rio de Janeiro–Galeão, Salvador da Bahia, São Paulo–Congonhas, São Paulo–Guarulhos; Seasonal: Fortaleza, São Luís
LATAM Brasil	Brasília, Fortaleza, Porto Alegre, São Paulo–Congonhas, São Paulo–Guarulhos
LATAM Chile	Santiago de Chile
Sky Airline	Seasonal: Santiago de Chile
TAP Air Portugal	Lisbon

== Statistics ==
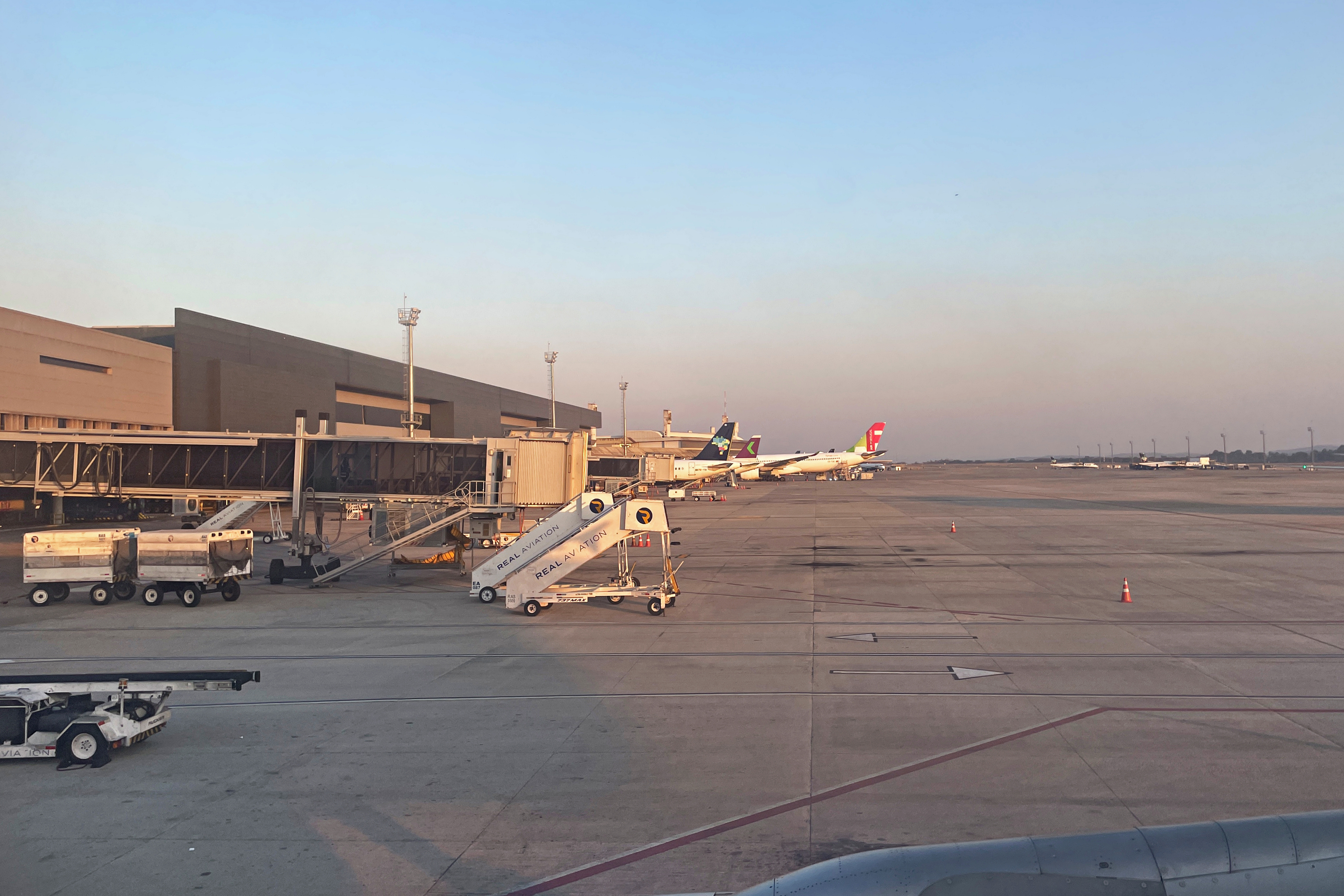
Apron

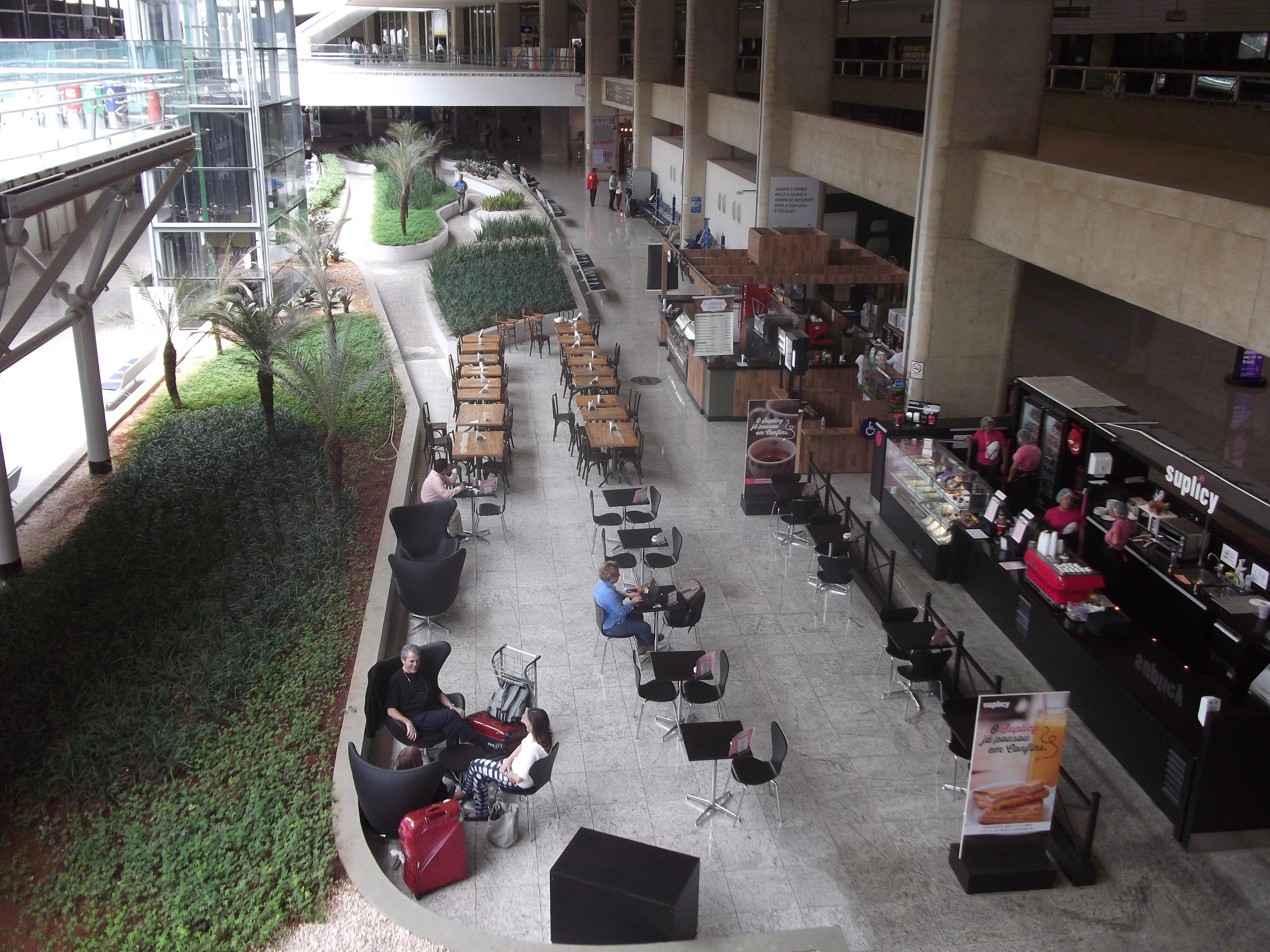
Airport interior

Following are the number of passenger, aircraft and cargo movements at the airport, according to Infraero (2007-July 2014) and BH Airport (August 2014-2025) reports:

Year	Passenger	Aircraft	Cargo (t)
2025	13,321,333 ▲8%	118,306 ▲4%	
2024	12,357,280 ▲18%	114,194 ▲15%	
2023	10,510,245 ▲10%	98,971 ▲9%	
2022	9,537,289 ▲38%	91,206 ▲37%	
2021	6,899,849 ▲43%	66,651 ▲43%	
2020	4,811,942 ▼57%	46,619 ▼54%	
2019	11,119,878 ▲4%	102,269 ▲1%	
2018	10,673,262 ▲5%	101,295 ▲2%	
2017	10,164,077 ▲5%	99,659	
2016	9,638,798 ▼15%	99,422 ▼12%	
2015	11,304,284 ▲4%	113,527 ▼6%	
2014	10,869,036 ▲6%	107,236 ▼2%	
2013	10,301,288 ▼1%	109,257 ▼9%	12,223 ▲18%
2012	10,398,296 ▲9%	120,149 ▲11%	10,337 ▼35%
2011	9,534,987 ▲31%	108,130 ▲27%	16,009 ▲19%
2010	7,261,064 ▲29%	84,851 ▲21%	13,404 ▼20%
2009	5,617,171 ▲16%	70,122 ▲18%	16,826 ▼22%
2008	4,826,193 ▲12%	59,541 ▲16%	21,608 ▲9%
2007	4,316,411	51,226	19,758

== Accidents and incidents ==
- 15 September 2001: a TAM Airlines Fokker 100 registration PT-MRN operating the charter flight 9755, flying from Recife to Campinas-Viracopos, following an uncontrolled engine failure en route to Campinas had 3 cabin windows shattered by fragments of the engine and made an emergency landing at Belo Horizonte-Confins. One passenger was sucked out partly and held by another passenger until the aircraft landed. The passenger did not survive.

== Access ==
The airport is located 44 km (27 mi) north of downtown Belo Horizonte. It is regularly served by buses, taxis and Executive Airport Shuttle Buses. When using buses, transfer to the Belo Horizonte metro is possible.

== See also ==
- List of airports in Brazil
