= Salvador Bahia Airport =

Salvador–Deputado Luís Eduardo Magalhães International Airport Aeroporto Internacional de Salvador–Deputado Luís Eduardo Magalhães
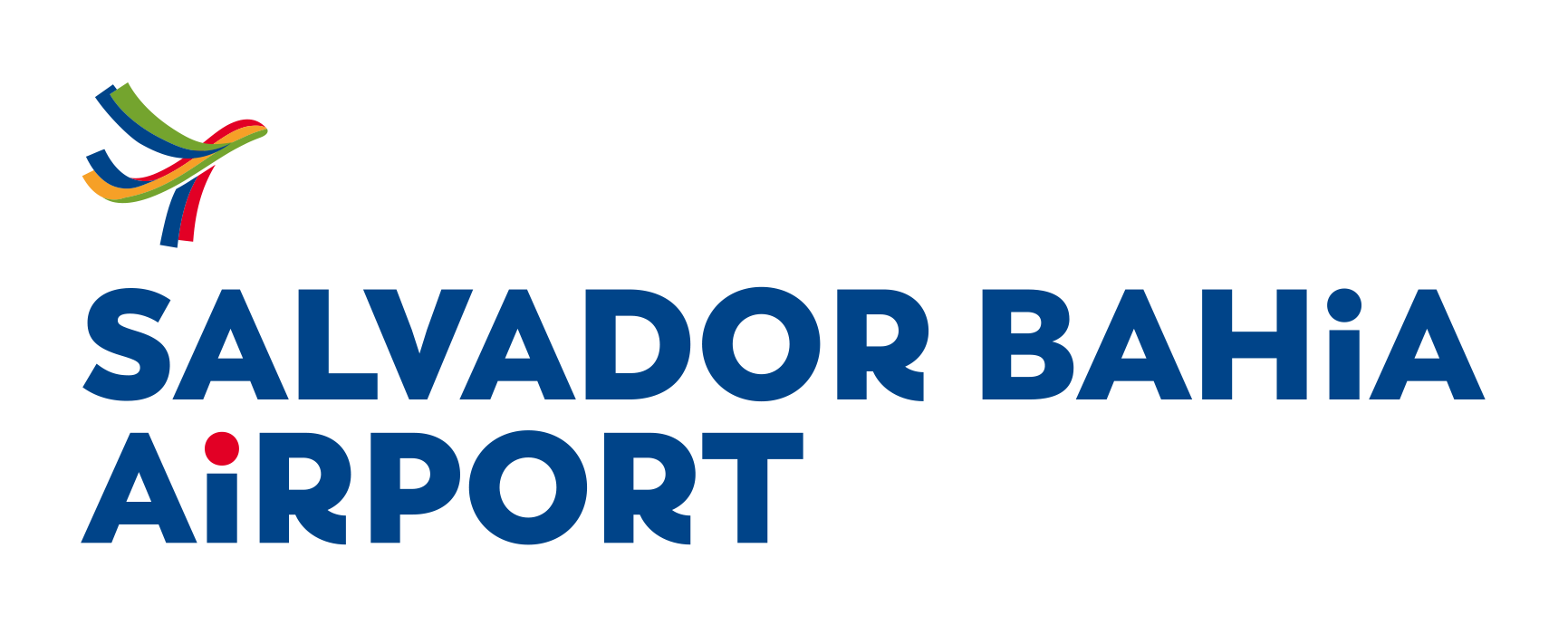

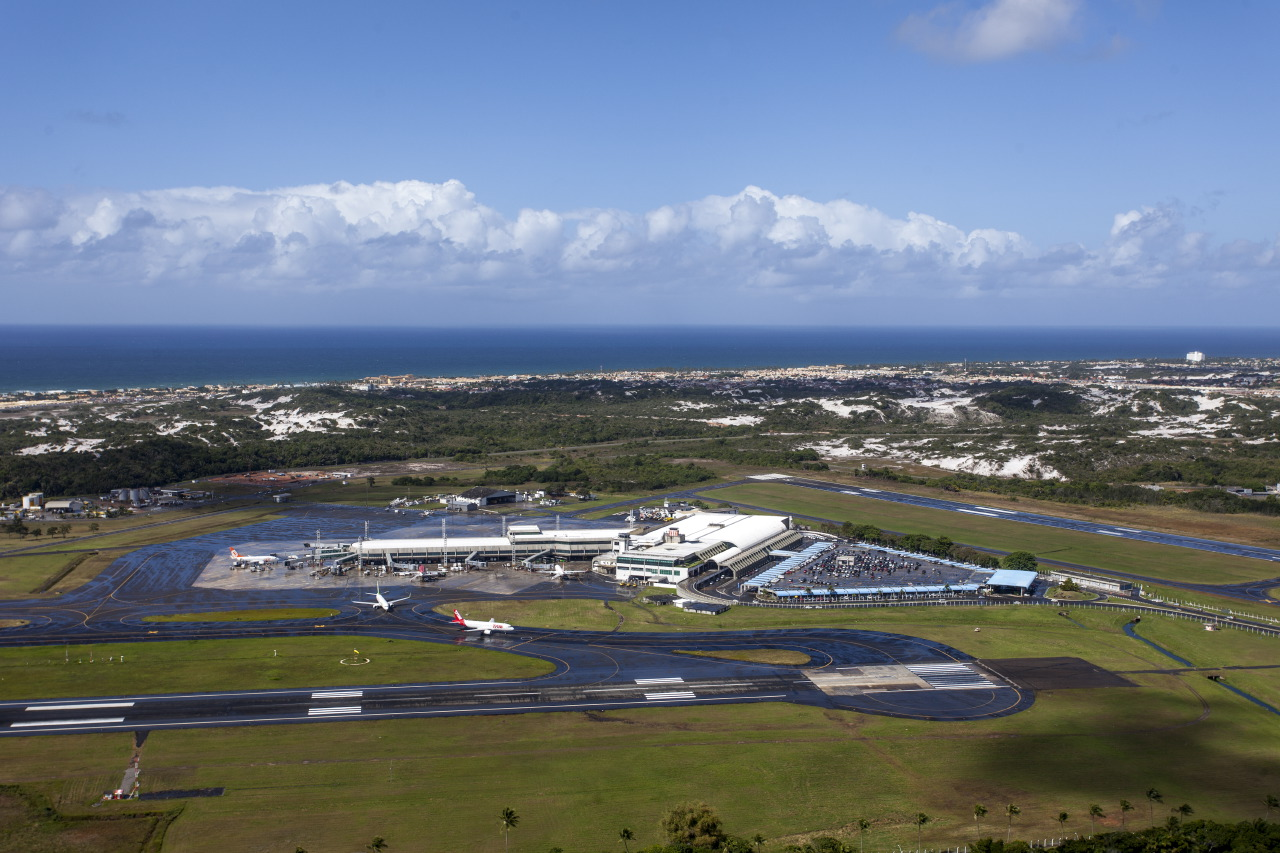
- IATA: SSA; ICAO: SBSV; LID: BA0001

Summary
- Airport type: Public/Military
- Operator: Infraero (1974–2017); Vinci SA (2017–present)
- Serves: Salvador da Bahia
- Opened: 1925
- Hub for: Abaeté Aviação; Gol Linhas Aéreas
- Time zone: BRT (UTC−03:00)
- Elevation AMSL: 20 m (66 ft)
- Coordinates: 12°54′31″S 038°19′21″W
- Website: www.salvador-airport.com.br/pt-br

Map
- Location in Brazil

Runways
Direction	Length		Surface
Direction	m	ft	Surface
10/28	3,003	9,852	Asphalt
17/35	1,518	4,980	Asphalt

Statistics (2025)
- Passengers: 7,186,760 ▼5%
- Aircraft Operations: 82,905 ▲4%
- Statistics: Vinci; Sources: Airport Website, ANAC, DECEA

Salvador–Deputado Luís Eduardo Magalhães International Airport (IATA: SSA, ICAO: SBSV), formerly called Dois de Julho International Airport and known by the trade name Salvador Bahia Airport, is the airport serving Salvador, Brazil. Since 16 June 1998, by Federal Law, the airport is named after Luís Eduardo Magalhães (1955–1998), an influential politician of the state of Bahia.

It is operated by Vinci SA.

Some of its facilities are shared with the Salvador Air Force Base of the Brazilian Air Force.

== History ==
The airport, originally called Santo Amaro do Ipitanga Airport, was established in 1925. In 1941 Panair do Brasil participating in the World War II efforts with the support of the American and Brazilian governments completely rebuilt the facility.

On 20 December 1955, the airport had its name changed for the first time: it became known as Dois de Julho International Airport, celebrating Bahia Independence Day. This is still the name by which the population of Salvador da Bahia call the facility. On 16 June 1998 the airport name was again changed to honor Luís Eduardo Maron Magalhães (1955–1998) an influential politician of the state of Bahia. This second change remains however controversial and there have been attempts to revert it. Since 2017 the concessionary has been using the Trade name Salvador Bahia Airport.

The airport is located in an area of more than 6 million square meters between sand dunes and native vegetation. The lush, bamboo-covered road to the airport has become one of the scenic attractions of Salvador da Bahia.

A brand new passenger terminal was opened in 1998, replacing an original outdated terminal. This new terminal continued to be upgraded and was completed by the end of year 2000. The main terminal, which includes a shopping mall has 69,400 m^{2}, 11 jetways and a capacity to handle 6,000,000 passengers/year. Traffic has been growing at an average of 14% per year.

Responding to critiques to the situation of its airports, on May 18, 2011, Infraero released a list evaluating some of its most important airports according to its saturation levels. According to the list, Salvador da Bahia was considered to be in good situation, operating with less than 70% of its capacity.

Previously operated by Infraero, on 16 March 2017, the concession of the facility was won by Vinci SA, for which it paid R$ 2,35 billions (€ 640 millions). The concession is for a period of 30 years. The new concessionary then planned to duplicate the passenger terminal.

On 26 April 2018, the Aeroporto station on Line 2 of the Salvador subway was opened to the public.

== Airlines and destinations ==
=== Passenger ===
Airlines	Destinations
Abaeté Aviação	Morro de São Paulo
Aerolíneas Argentinas	Buenos Aires–Aeroparque
Air Europa	Madrid
Air France	Paris–Charles de Gaulle
Azul Brazilian Airlines	Aracaju, Barreiras, Belo Horizonte–Confins, Campinas, Guanambi, Ilhéus, Lençóis, Porto Seguro, Recife, Vitória da Conquista; Seasonal: Ribeirão Preto, São Paulo–Congonhas, Uberlândia
Copa Airlines	Panama City–Tocumen
Gol Linhas Aéreas	Aracaju (ends 30 January 2027), Belo Horizonte–Confins, Brasília, Buenos Aires–Aeroparque (ends 31 January 2027), Campina Grande (ends 30 January 2027), Campinas, Curitiba (ends 30 January 2027), Fortaleza, Goiânia, João Pessoa, Maceió, Natal, Petrolina (ends 28 January 2027), Porto Alegre (ends 31 January 2027), Porto Seguro (ends 31 January 2027), Recife, Rio de Janeiro–Galeão, São Luís, São Paulo–Congonhas, São Paulo–Guarulhos, Teresina, Vitória, Vitória da Conquista; Seasonal: Ilhéus
LATAM Brasil	Brasília, Fortaleza, Rio de Janeiro–Galeão, São Paulo–Congonhas, São Paulo–Guarulhos, Santiago de Chile (begins 3 January 2027); Seasonal: Porto Alegre, Rio de Janeiro–Santos Dumont
Sky Airline	Buenos Aires–Ezeiza, Montevideo, Santiago de Chile
TAP Air Portugal	Lisbon

== Statistics ==
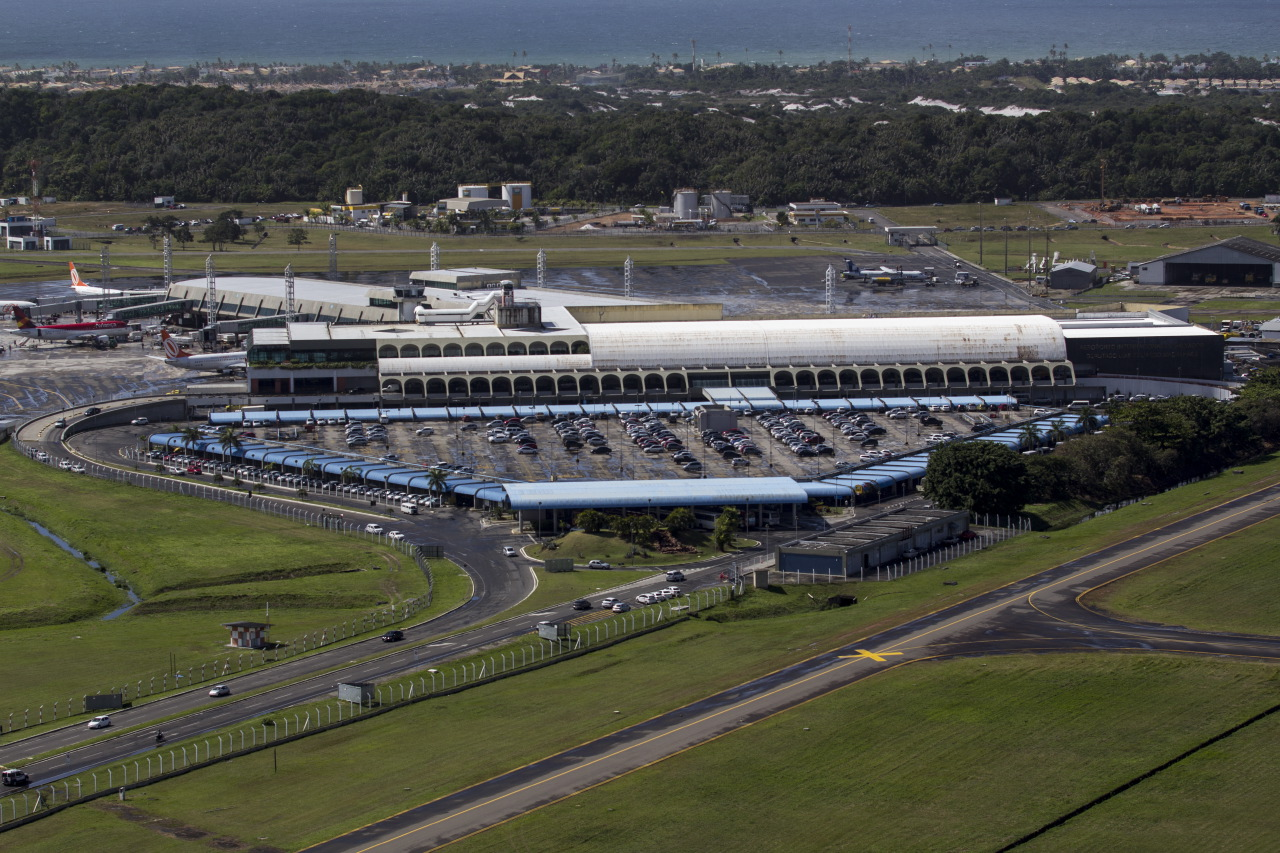
Aerial View

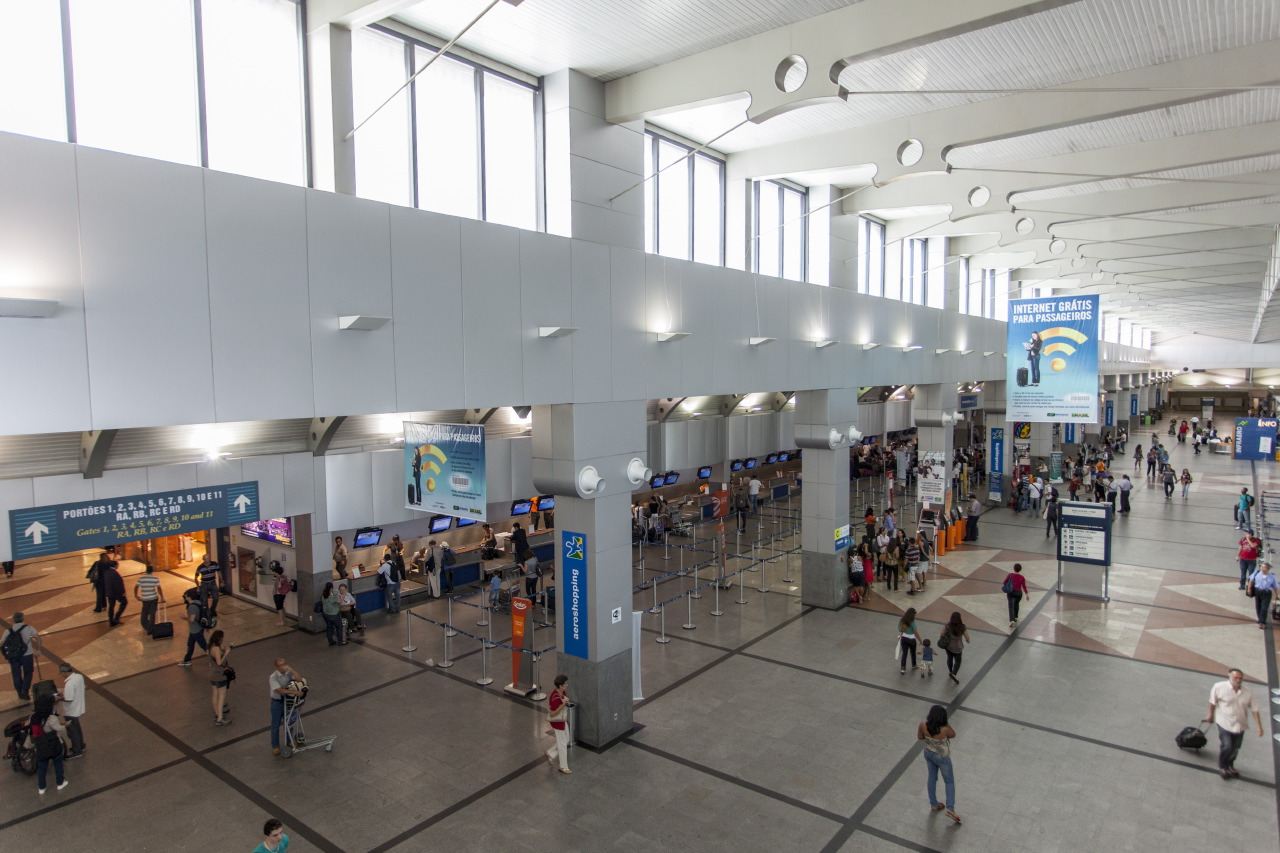
View of check-in area

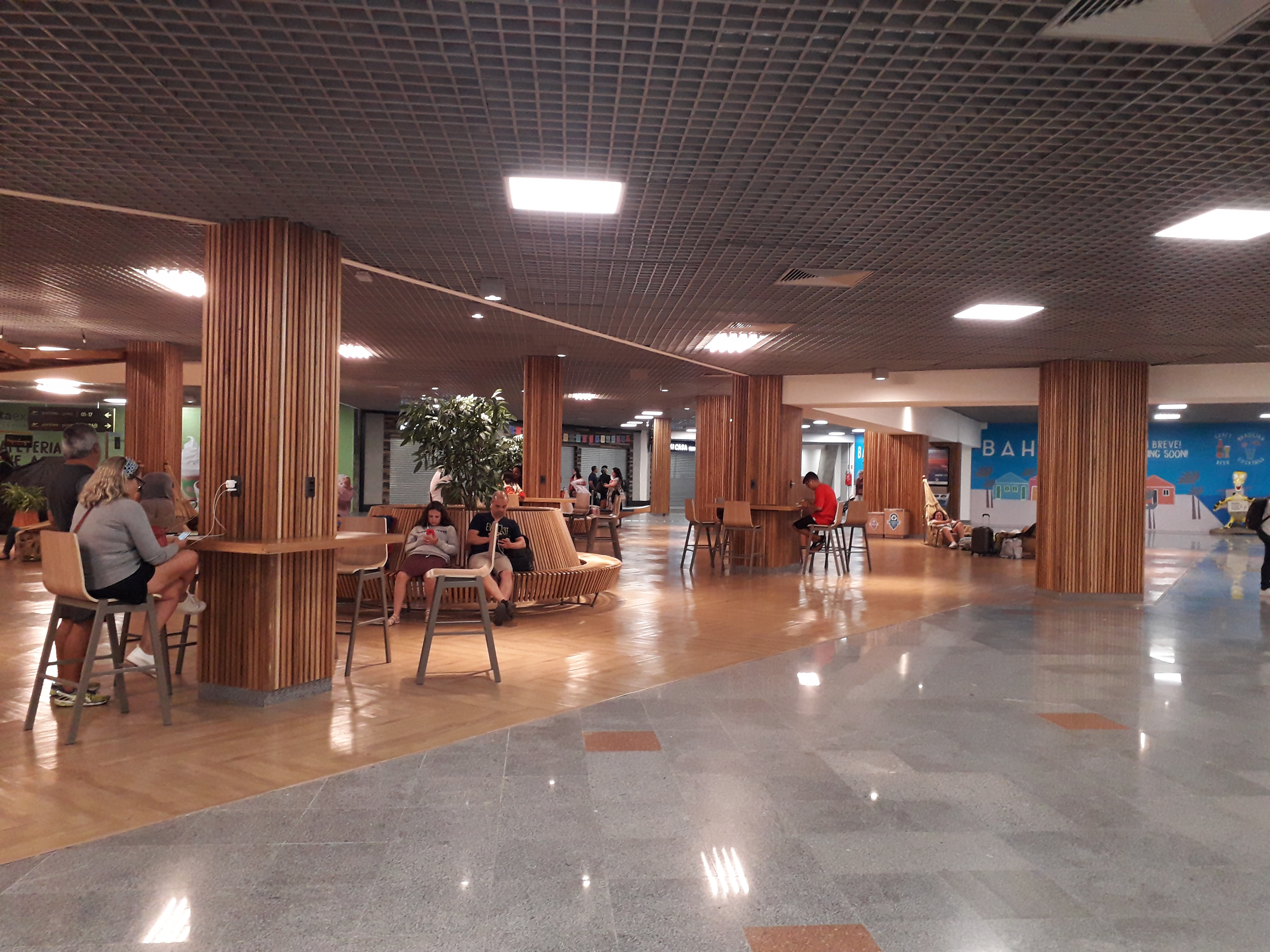
Departure lounge.

Following are the number of passenger, aircraft and cargo movements at the airport, according to Infraero (2007-2017) and Vinci (2018-2025) reports:

Year	Passenger	Aircraft	Cargo (t)
2025	7,186,760 ▼5%	82,905 ▲4%	
2024	7,527,462 ▲3%	79,792 ▲3%	
2023	7,279,788 ▲11%	77,325 ▲2%	
2022	6,552,356 ▲21%	75,886 ▲12%	
2021	5,410,527 ▲44%	67,719 ▲36%	
2020	3,769,130 ▼50%	49,640 ▼37%	
2019	7,537,112	78,355	
2018^{a}	3,976,671	41,421	
2017	7,735,685 ▲3%	76,642 ▼4%	30,055
2016	7,526,358 ▼17%	79,484 ▼18%	29,995 ▲30%
2015	9,047,403 ▼1%	97,139 ▼9%	23,136 ▼29%
2014	9,152,159 ▲7%	107,255 ▼1%	32,754 ▲33%
2013	8,589,663 ▼3%	107,977 ▼11%	24,669 ▼18%
2012	8,811,540 ▲5%	121,587 ▼3%	30,092 ▼51%
2011	8,394,900 ▲9%	125,980 ▲10%	61,880 ▲27%
2010	7,696,307 ▲9%	114,946 ▲12%	48,770 ▲9%
2009	7,052,720 ▲17%	102,211 ▲7%	44,796 ▼23%
2008	6,042,307 ▲2%	95,804 ▲5%	58,148 ▼18%
2007	5,932,461	90,989	71,136

Note:
^{a}: 2018 series provided by Vinci is incomplete, lacking data for the months of January until part of June.

== Accidents and incidents ==
=== Accidents with fatalities ===
- 21 September 1944: A Panair do Brasil Lockheed Model 18 Lodestar registration PP-PBH crashed shortly after take-off from Salvador da Bahia. All 16 occupants died.

== Access ==
The airport is located 28 km (17 mi) north from downtown Salvador da Bahia.

A free shuttle bus runs every 15 minutes from 5am to 1am to Aeroporto station of Salvador subway, which connects to downtown Salvador at Lapa.

== See also ==
- List of airports in Brazil
- Salvador Air Force Base
