= Azul Brazilian Airlines =

Brazilian airline

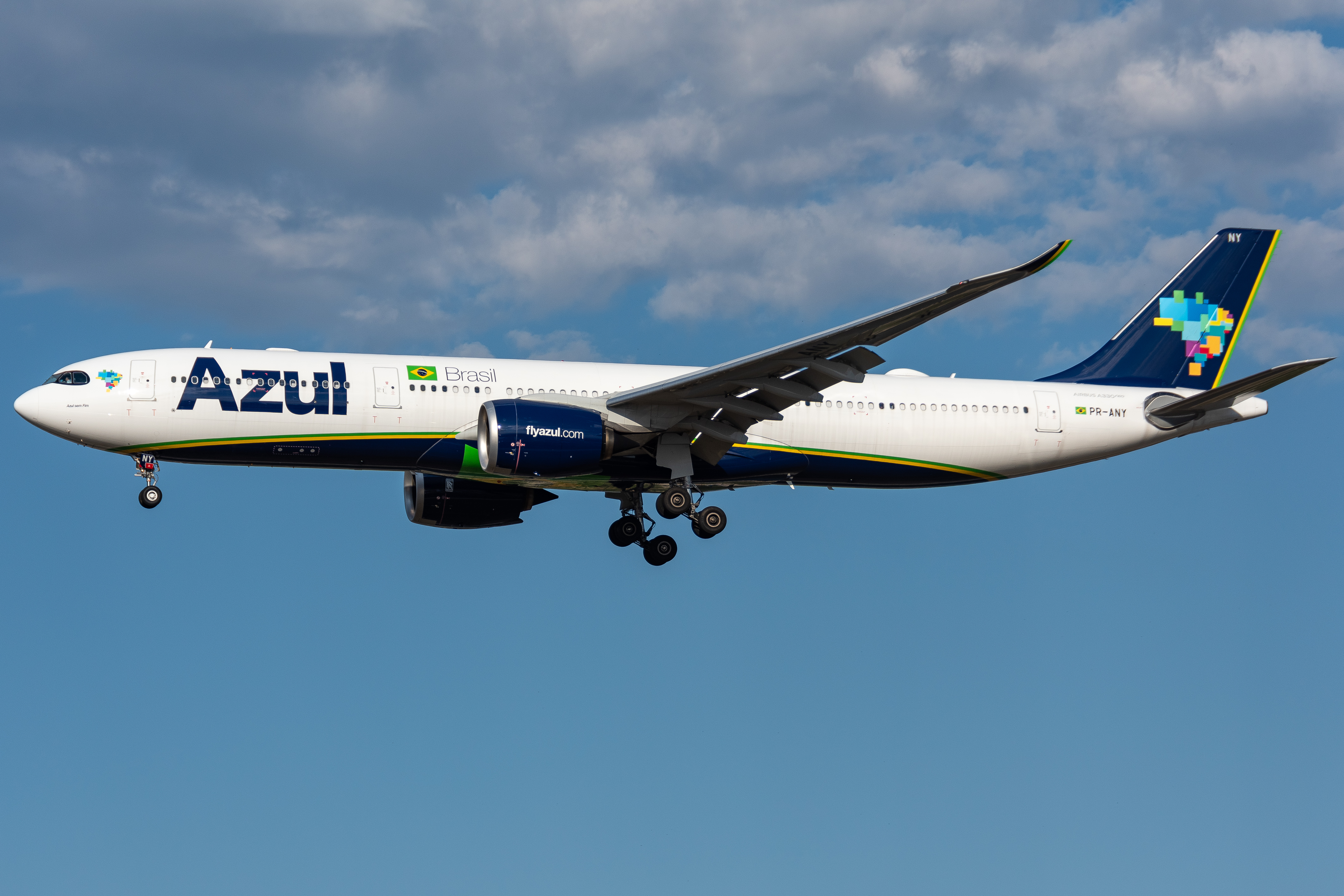
- An Azul Airbus A330neo
IATA	ICAO	Call sign
AD	AZU	AZUL
- Founded: 5 May 2008; 18 years ago
- AOC #: 10,123 – 23 December 2022
- Hubs: Belo Horizonte; Campinas; Recife
- Focus cities: Cuiabá; Curitiba
- Frequent-flyer program: TudoAzul
- Subsidiaries: Azul Conecta; Azul Logística
- Fleet size: 191
- Destinations: 150
- Traded as: B3: AZUL4; NYSE: AZUL
- Headquarters: Barueri, Brazil
- Key people: David Neeleman (Founder and Chairman); Abhi Shah (President); John Rodgerson (CEO)
- Revenue: ▲ R$9.97 billion (2021)
- Operating income: ▲ R$524.9 million (2021)
- Net income: ▼ R$945.7 million (2021)
- Employees: 12,485
- Website: www.voeazul.com.br

Azul Linhas Aéreas Brasileiras S/A (Azul Brazilian Airlines; or simply Azul) is a Brazilian airline headquartered in Barueri, a suburb of São Paulo. The company's business model is to stimulate demand by providing frequent and affordable air service to underserved markets throughout Brazil. The company was named Azul ("Blue" in Portuguese) after a naming contest in 2008, where "Samba" was the other popular name. Azul is a publicly traded company on the Brazilian stock exchange, with the ticker AZUL4. It was established on 5 May 2008 by Brazilian-born David Neeleman (founder of American low-cost airline JetBlue), with a fleet of 76 Embraer 195 jets. The airline began service on 15 December 2008.

According to the Brazilian Civil Aviation Authority (ANAC), between January and December 2019, Azul had 23.5% of the domestic and 5.0% of the international market shares in terms of revenue passenger kilometers (RPK), making it the third largest domestic and second largest international airline in Brazil.

== History ==
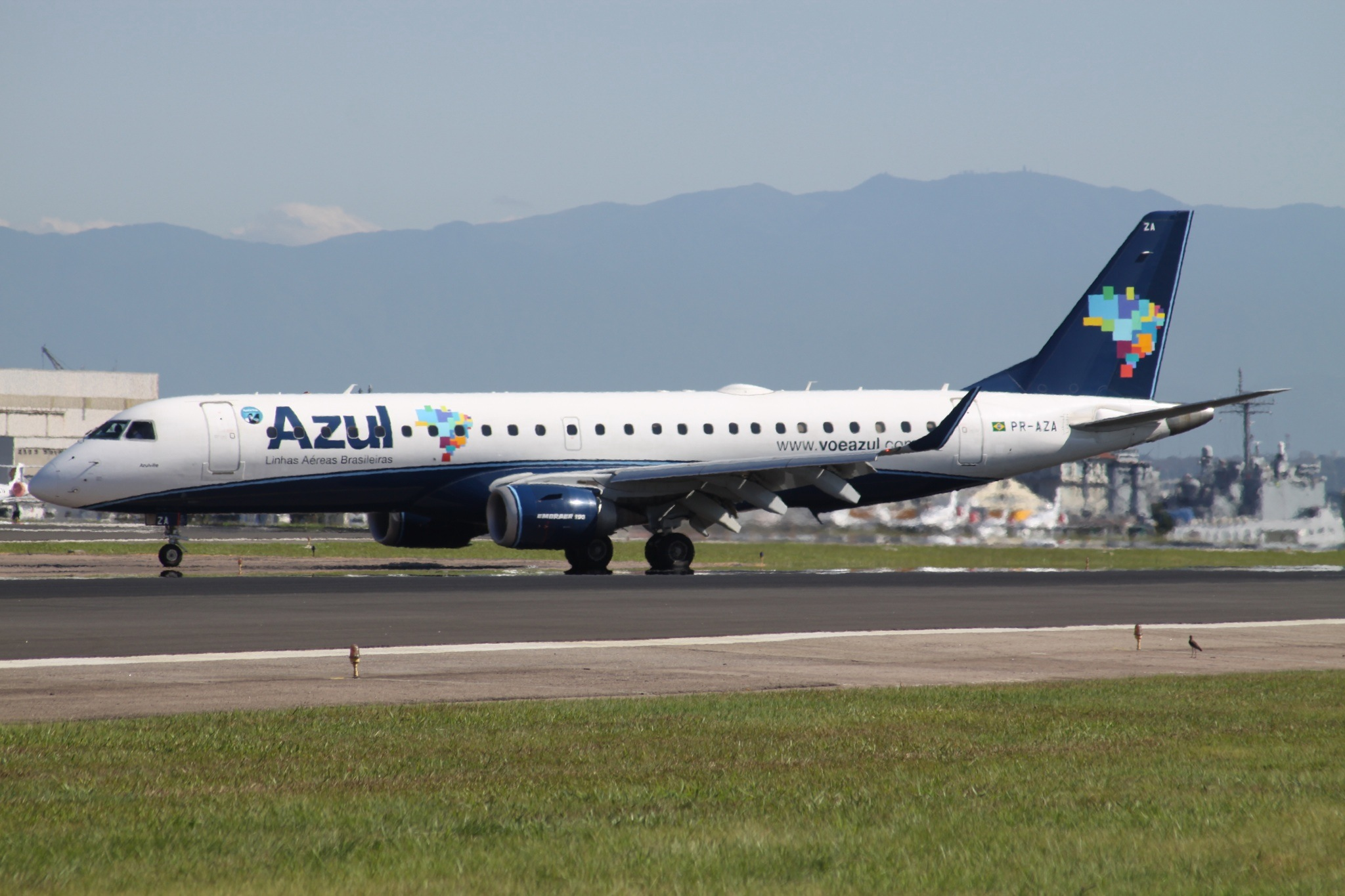
Azul Embraer 190 in Rio de Janeiro

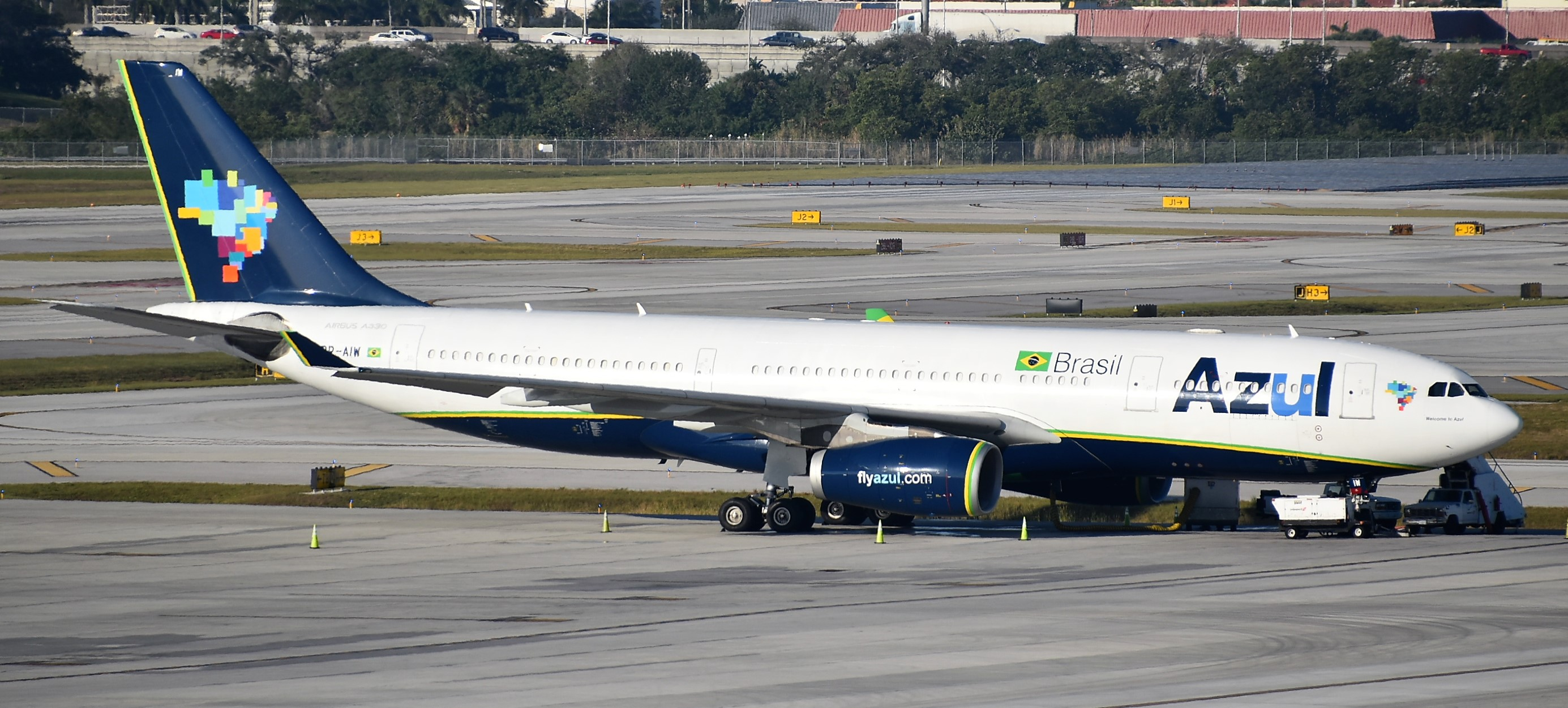
Azul Airbus A330-200 in Fort Lauderdale

=== Foundation and early years ===
Azul Linhas Aéreas Brasileiras S.A. was the fourth airline launched by David Neeleman, after Morris Air, WestJet and JetBlue. Azul inaugurated services in the Brazilian domestic market on 15 December 2008 between Campinas and 3 cities: Rio de Janeiro, Salvador, and Porto Alegre. It launched operations with two Embraer 190 and three Embraer 195 aircraft. Another three aircraft were added in January 2009 to introduce nonstop service from Campinas to both Vitória and Curitiba.

On 28 May 2012, Azul announced the acquisition of TRIP Linhas Aéreas, the largest regional carrier in Brazil. Azul and Trip started comprehensive code-sharing operations on 2 December 2012, with all flights carrying only the IATA code of Azul. On 6 March 2013, Brazilian authorities gave the final approval for the merger with a few restrictions related to code-sharing with TAM Airlines and slot use at Rio de Janeiro–Santos Dumont Airport. On 6 May 2014, the merger was completed with the final approval from Brazilian authorities. That day the brand TRIP ceased to exist and all TRIP assets were transferred to Azul.

While the airline is not currently a full member in an airline alliance, it signed a codeshare agreement with Star Alliance airline United Airlines in January 2014, which made it possible for MileagePlus members to earn points when flying with Azul beginning 1 April 2014.

In December 2014, Azul started its first scheduled international flights, to Fort Lauderdale on 2 December and Orlando on 15 December, both in the United States.

=== Development since 2015 ===
In early 2015, it was announced that Azul had signed a purchase agreement for 35 Airbus A320neo aircraft. It was also to lease a further 28 of the aircraft type. In mid 2015, Azul finalised a deal for 30 Embraer 195-E2 aircraft, including 20 options, first announced at the 2014 Farnborough International Air Show. The first delivery was scheduled for 2020.

On 24 November 2015, it was announced that the Chinese HNA Group, owner of Hainan Airlines, would invest US$450 million in Azul, becoming its largest single shareholder. This follows the US$100 million investment of United Airlines closed in June 2015.

Azul signed a nonbinding deal to buy Avianca Brasil's assets on 11 March 2019, calling for the rehiring of all Avianca Brazil's staff and the merger between the two carriers, with Azul as the surviving brand.

On 14 January 2020, Azul Brazilian Airlines signed an agreement to purchase TwoFlex. On 27 March 2020, the Brazilian regulatory bodies approved the purchase and sale of flights started on 14 April 2020. TwoFlex operates as a feeder airline to Azul.

On May 28, 2025, Azul Brazilian Airlines filed for Chapter 11 bankruptcy after being affected with higher expenses within the last year. The company has plans to shed up to $2 billion in debt, receive $1.6 billion in financing throughout the procedure, and an additional $950 million in financing upon exiting bankruptcy, with bondholders and strategic partners such as American Airlines and United Airlines supporting the restructuring. Azul stated that they plan to exit bankruptcy in the beginning of 2026.

== Corporate affairs ==
The key trends for Azul are (as of the financial year ending 31 December):

	Total revenue (R$ b)	Net profit (R$ b)	Number of employees (FTE)	Number of passengers (m) (Note: "Passenger flight segments")	Passenger load factor (%)	Cities served	Total aircraft (Note: Includes aircraft held under finance and operating leases)	References
2010	0.87	−0.09	2,940			28	27	
2011	1.7	−0.10	4,329			43	49	
2012	2.7	−0.17	8,914			100	124	
2013	5.2	0.02	9,848	19.8	79.1	103	137	
2014	5.8	−0.06	10,501	20.4	79.4	106	153	
2015	6.2	−1.0	10,533	21.7	79.6	102	152	
2016	6.6	−0.12	10,311	20.6	79.7	102	139	
2017	7.7	0.42	10,878	22.0	82.1	104	147	
2018	9.0	−0.63	11,807	23.1	82.3	110	143	
2019	11.4	−2.4	13,189	27.6	83.5	116	166	
2020	5.7	−10.8	12,004	14.7	80.0	112	192	
2021	9.9	−4.2	13,163	23.3	79.2	147	192	
2022	15.9	−0.72	14,247	27.4	79.7	158	212	
2023	18.5	−2.3	16,017	29.2	80.4	162	209	
2024	19.5	−9.1	16,173	30.8	81.6	152	220	

== Destinations ==
In November 2025, Azul and Azul Conecta served 150 destinations in Brazil, Argentina, Curaçao (Netherlands), Paraguay, Portugal, Spain, the United States, and Uruguay plus some other additional locations by means of dedicated executive bus services to the nearest airports.

=== Codeshare agreements ===
Azul has interline agreements and codeshare agreements with the following airlines:

- Air Canada
- Air Europa
- American Airlines
- Emirates
- Ethiopian Airlines
- ITA Airways
- JetBlue Airways
- TAP Air Portugal
- Turkish Airlines
- United Airlines

=== Interline agreements ===
- Aerolíneas Argentinas
- Air Transat
- Copa Airlines
- Etihad Airways
- Hainan Airlines
- Lufthansa
- Singapore Airlines

== Fleet ==
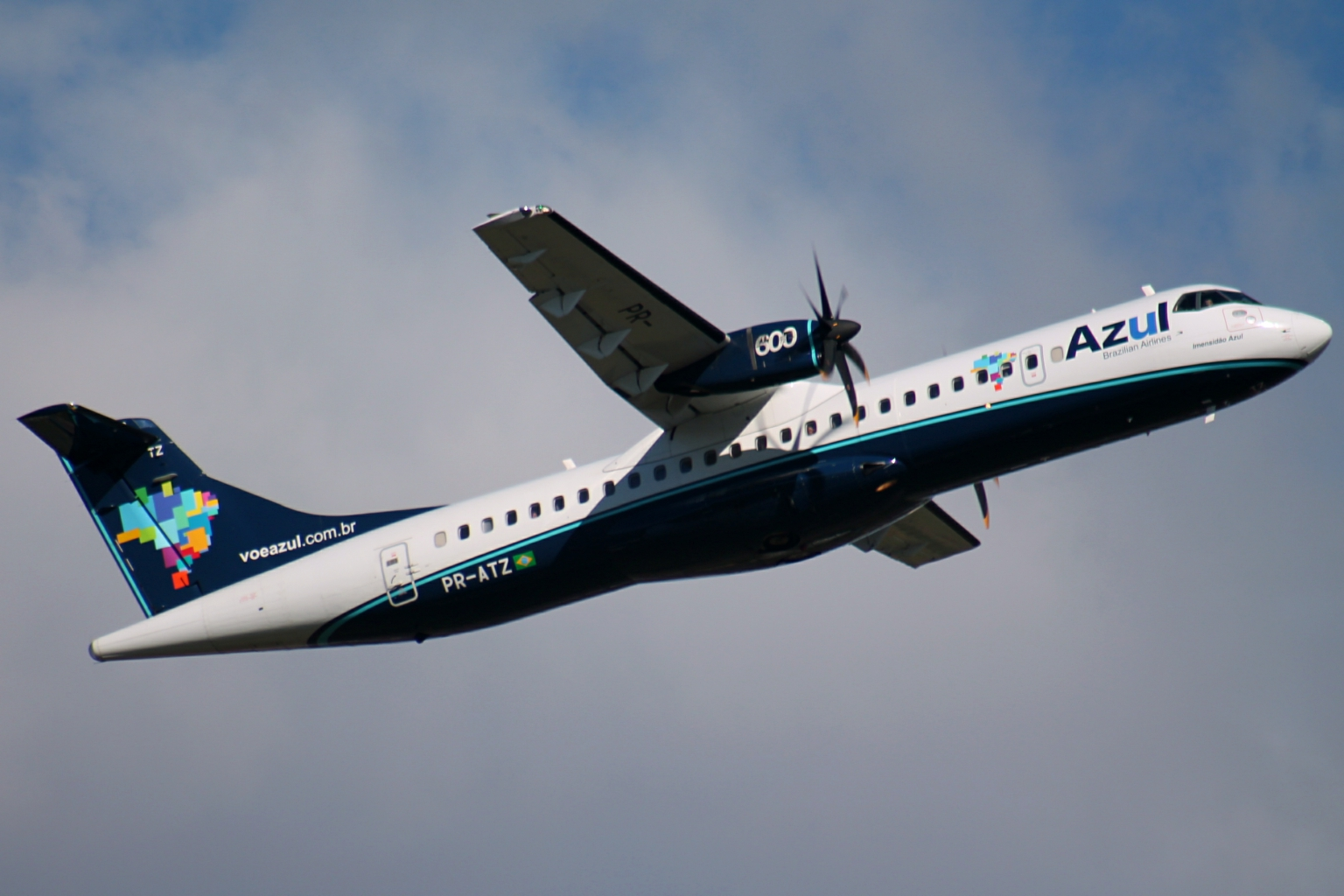
Azul ATR 72-600

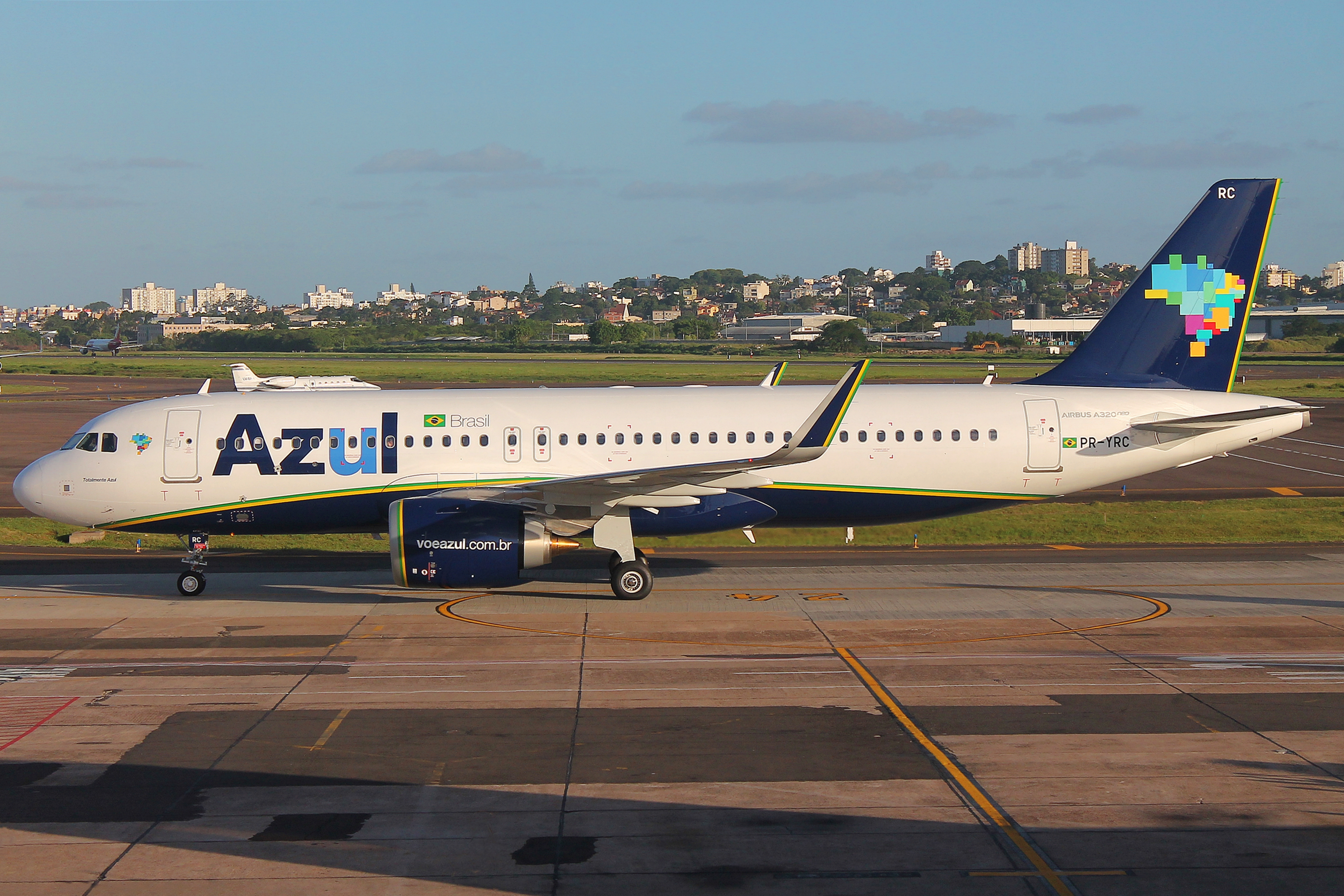
Azul Airbus A320 in Porto Alegre

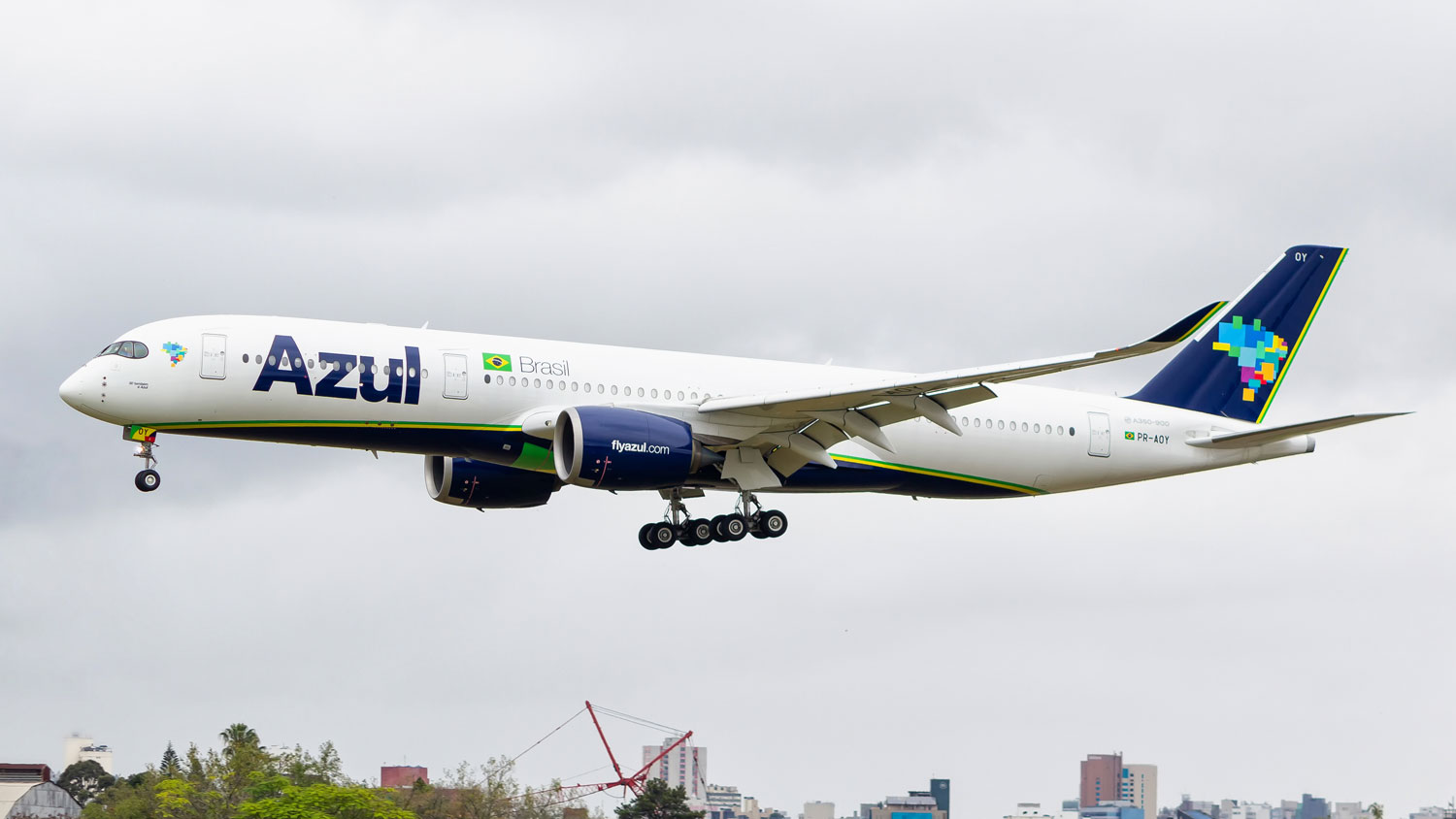
Former Azul Airbus A350

As of November 2026, Azul Brazilian Airlines operates the following aircraft:

Azul Brazilian Airlines fleet
Aircraft	In service	Orders	Passengers				Notes
Aircraft	In service	Orders	B	E+	E	Total	Notes
Airbus A320neo	51	—	—	30	144	174	
Airbus A321neo	6	—	—	42	172	214	
Airbus A330-200	6	4	20	100	151	271	
Airbus A330-200	6	4	35	48	155	238	
Airbus A330-900	2	11	34	96	168	298	
ATR 72-600	40	3	—	—	70	70	
Boeing 767-300ER	1	—	34	—	199	233	Leased form EuroAtlantic Airways
Embraer 195	37	—	—	18	100	118	
Embraer 195-E2	50	25	—	20	116	136	
Azul Logística fleet
Airbus A321-200P2F	4	—	Cargo				
Total	198	43					

== See also ==
- List of airlines of Brazil
