= SBCC =

SBCC may refer to:

Communication

- Social and Behavior Change Communication

Construction

- State Building Code Council, Washington State

Geography

- Santa Barbara City College
- Campo de Provas Brigadeiro Velloso, a military base in Pará, Brazil
  - Cachimbo Airport, the airport at the base

Medicine

- Superficial Basal cell carcinoma (sBcc)
