= List of Brazilian military bases =

The following is a list of military bases in Brazil, sorted by location:

== Air Force ==
=== Air Force Bases ===
Location	State	ICAO	Code	LID	Base name
Anápolis	GO	SBAN	ALA2	GO9001	Anápolis Air Force Base
Belém	PA	SBBE	ALA9	PA0001	Belém Air Force Base
Lago Sul	DF	SBBR	ALA1	DF0001	Brasília Air Force Base
Campo Grande	MS	SBCG	ALA5	MS0001	Campo Grande Air Force Base
Canoas	RS	SBCO	ALA3	RS9002	Canoas Air Force Base
Florianópolis	SC	SBFL	BAFL	SC0001	Florianópolis Air Force Base
Fortaleza	CE	SBFZ	BAFZ	CE0001	Fortaleza Air Force Base
Guarulhos	SP	SBGR	BASP	SP0002	São Paulo Air Force Base
Manaus	AM	SBMN	ALA8	AM9001	Manaus Air Force Base
Parnamirim	RN	SBNT	ALA10	RN9001	Natal Air Force Base
Porto Velho	RO	SBPV	ALA6	RO0001	Porto Velho Air Force Base
Rio de Janeiro	RJ	SBGL	ALA11	RJ0001	Galeão Air Force Base
Rio de Janeiro	RJ	SBSC	ALA12	RJ9003	Santa Cruz Air Force Base
Rio de Janeiro	RJ	SBAF	BAAF	RJ9002	Afonsos Air Force Base
Salvador da Bahia	BA	SBSV	BASV	BA0001	Salvador Air Force Base
Santa Maria	RS	SBSM	ALA4	RS0003	Santa Maria Air Force Base
Santos	SP	SBST	BAST	SP9006	Santos Air Force Base

=== Testing and Training Range ===
Location	State	Facility name
Serra do Cachimbo	PA	Campo de Provas Brigadeiro Velloso

=== Former Air Force Bases ===
Location	State	Code	Base name	Operative	Note
Curitiba	PR		Bacacheri Air Force Base	1942-1980	Became Bacacheri Airport
Recife	PE	BARF	Recife Air Force Base	1941-2024	Became exclusively Recife/Guararapes–Gilberto Freyre International Airport
Rio de Janeiro	RJ		Jacarepaguá Air Force Base	1944-1966	Became Jacarepaguá Airport

== Navy ==
=== Naval Bases and Stations ===
Location	State	Base name
Belém	PA	Val de Cães Naval Base
Itaguaí	RJ	Madeira Island Submarine Base
Ladário	MS	Ladário Fluvial Base
Manaus	AM	Rio Negro Naval Station
Natal	RN	Almte. Ary Parreiras Naval Base
Natal	RN	Natal Naval Base
Niterói	RJ	Almte. Castro e Silva Naval Base
Rio de Janeiro	RJ	Ilha das Flores Naval Infantry Base
Rio de Janeiro	RJ	Ilha do Governador Naval Infantry Base
Rio de Janeiro	RJ	Rio Meriti Naval Infantry Base
Rio de Janeiro	RJ	Navy Arsenal of Rio de Janeiro
Rio de Janeiro	RJ	Rio de Janeiro Naval Base
Rio Grande	RS	Rio Grande Naval Station
Salvador da Bahia	BA	Aratu Naval Base

=== Naval Air Base ===
Location	State	ICAO	Code	LID	Base name
São Pedro da Aldeia	RJ	SBES		RJ9001	São Pedro da Aldeia Naval Air Base
