= Vera Cruz Airport =

Former airport that served Brasília, Brazil

Vera Cruz Airport Aeroporto de Vera Cruz
- Runway of Vera Cruz Airport
- IATA: none; ICAO: none

Summary
- Airport type: Defunct
- Serves: Brasília
- Opened: 1955
- Closed: 3 May 1957
- Coordinates: 15°46′32″S 047°56′27″W

Map
- Location in Brazil

Runways
Direction	Length		Surface
Direction	ft	m	Surface
	8,900	2,700	dirt
- Demolished, no longer operational.

Vera Cruz Airport was the first airport built in Brasília, Brasil. the airport served the construction of Brasília, while Brasília International Airport was not operational.

It was named by José Pessoa, who wanted to baptize the city as Vera Cruz, the first name of Brazil. It was located where later the Integrated Bus and Train Terminal was built.

== History ==
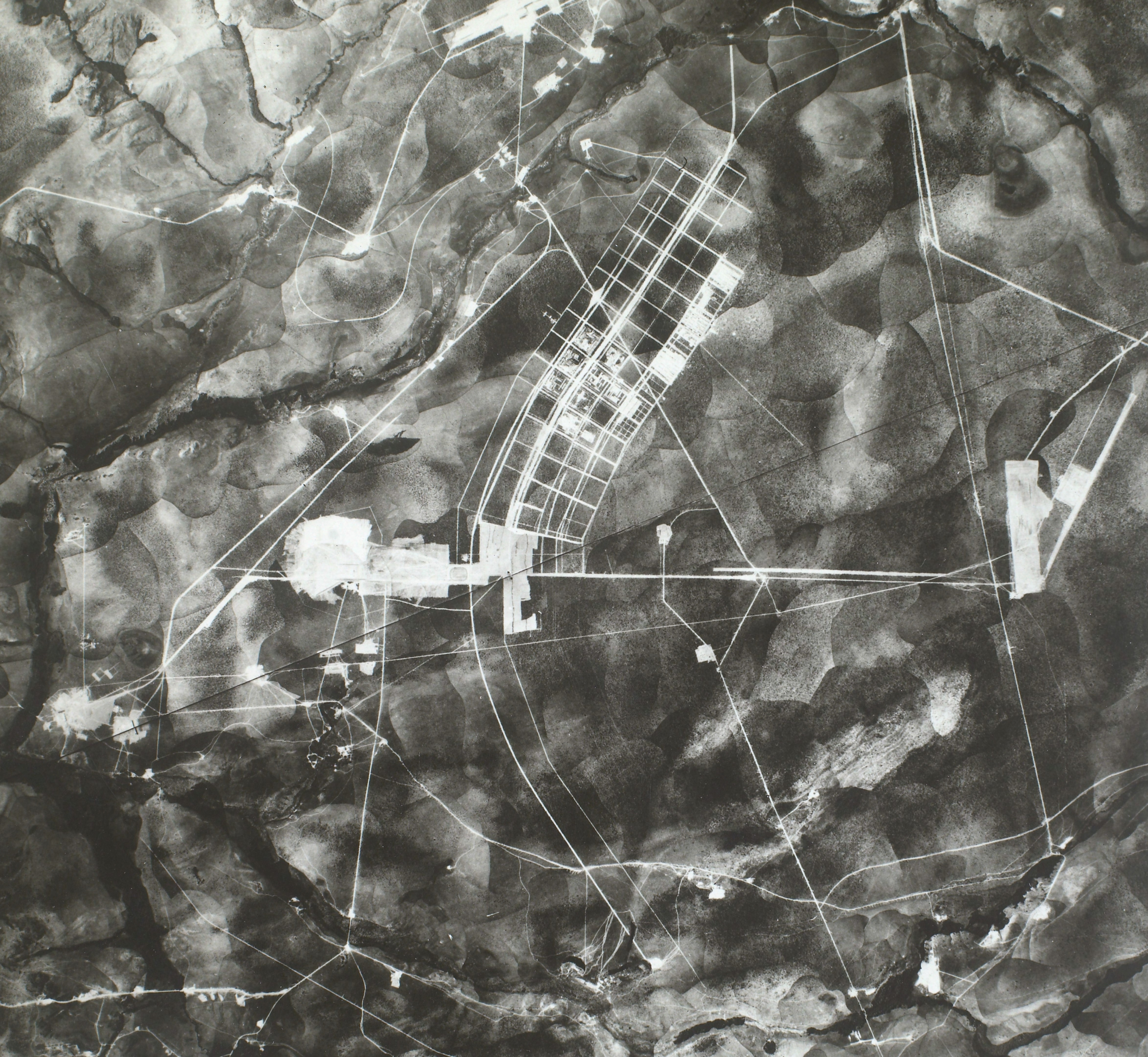
Image taken in 1958. Vera Cruz Airport is to the right, at the end of the line that marks the Monumental Axis.

The airport was built by the then-Vice Governor of Goiás, Bernardo Sayão, at the request of the then-President of the Commission for the Location of the New Federal Capital, Marshal José Pessoa, in 1955. President Juscelino Kubitschek needed to visit the city's construction sites; for this reason, a temporary airport was required, given that the new airport would not be ready until 1957.

The name "Vera Cruz" was also suggested by Marshal José Pessoa, who had hoped to bestow that same name upon the new capital to be established in the region, thereby reviving the name given by the Portuguese navigators. However, the Relocation Law approved by the National Congress and sanctioned by the President on September 19, 1956, changed the name of the future capital to Brasília, rendering the bold white lettering spelling "Vera Cruz" on the airport tarmac obsolete.

The runway was made of dirt and was 2,700 metres (8,900 ft) long. The passenger terminal was a makeshift, cob-wall shack covered with buriti-leaves.

Due to its strategic importance as a gateway to the city, the permanent airport was a priority among the construction projects for the new capital and was one of the first to be completed. With the inauguration of Brasília International Airport on May 3, 1957, Vera Cruz Airport was decommissioned. The Intergrated Bus and Train Terminal was built in 1976 on the site where it once stood, at the western end of the Monumental Axis.

== Accident ==
- 2 February 1957: the only registered accident had the pilot Termosiris Belo and the Novacap representative Augusto Montadon as victims.

== Access ==
The airport was located 10 km (6 mi) northwest of downtown Brasília.
