= Salvador Air Force Base =

Air base of the Brazilian Air Force

- Base Aérea de Salvador
- Salvador da Bahia, Bahia in Brazil

Site information
- Type: Air Force Base
- Code: BASV
- Owner: Brazilian Air Force
- Controlled by: Brazilian Air Force
- Open to the public: No
- Website: www.fab.mil.br/organizacoes/mostra/47/BASE%20A%C3%89REA%20DE%20SALVADOR

Location
- Location in Brazil
- Coordinates: 12°54′31″S 038°19′21″W

Site history
- Built: 1925
- In use: 1942-present

Garrison information
- Current commander: Cel. Av. Ivan Lucas Karpischin

Airfield information
- Identifiers: IATA: SSA, ICAO: SBSV, LID: BA0001
- Elevation: 20 metres (66 ft) AMSL
Runways
Direction	Length and surface
10/28	3,003 metres (9,852 ft) Asphalt
17/35	1,518 metres (4,980 ft) Asphalt

Base Aérea de Salvador – BASV (IATA: SSA, ICAO: SBSV) is a base of the Brazilian Air Force, located in Salvador da Bahia, Brazil.

It shares some facilities with Dep. Luís Eduardo Magalhães International Airport.

== History ==
Salvador Air Force Base was created on 5 November 1942 by Decree no. 4,916.

== Units ==
Since January 2017, there are no permanent flying units assigned to Salvador Air Force Base. Whenever needed, the aerodrome is used as a support facility to other air units of the Brazilian Air Force, Navy, and Army.

=== Former Units ===
March 1947–January 2018: 1st Squadron of the 7th Aviation Group (1°/7°GAv) Orungan. The squadron was moved to Santa Cruz Air Force Base.

== Access ==
The base is located 28 km from downtown Salvador da Bahia.

== Accidents and incidents ==
- 11 July 1952: a Brazilian Air Force Douglas C-47A-35-DL registration FAB-2048 flying from Salvador da Bahia to Rio de Janeiro crashed following an engine fire. Thirteen of the 33 occupants died.
- 21 September 1959: a Brazilian Air Force Lockheed P-15 Neptune registration FAB-7007 operating a Search and Rescue mission for a missing aircraft crashed after take-off. The six occupants died.

== Gallery ==
This gallery displays aircraft that have been based at Salvador Air Force Base. The gallery is not comprehensive.

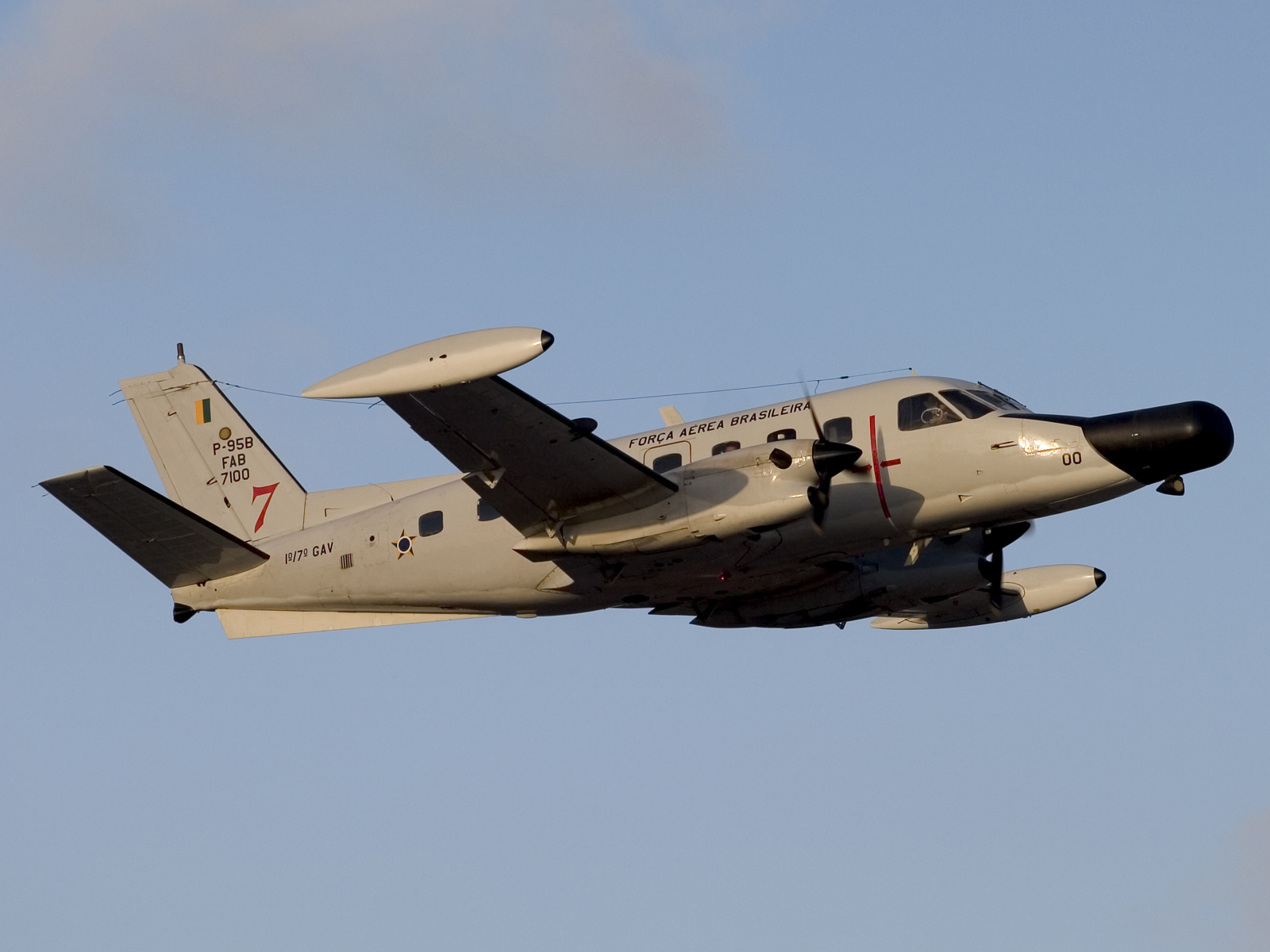
Embraer P-95B Bandeirulha (FAB)

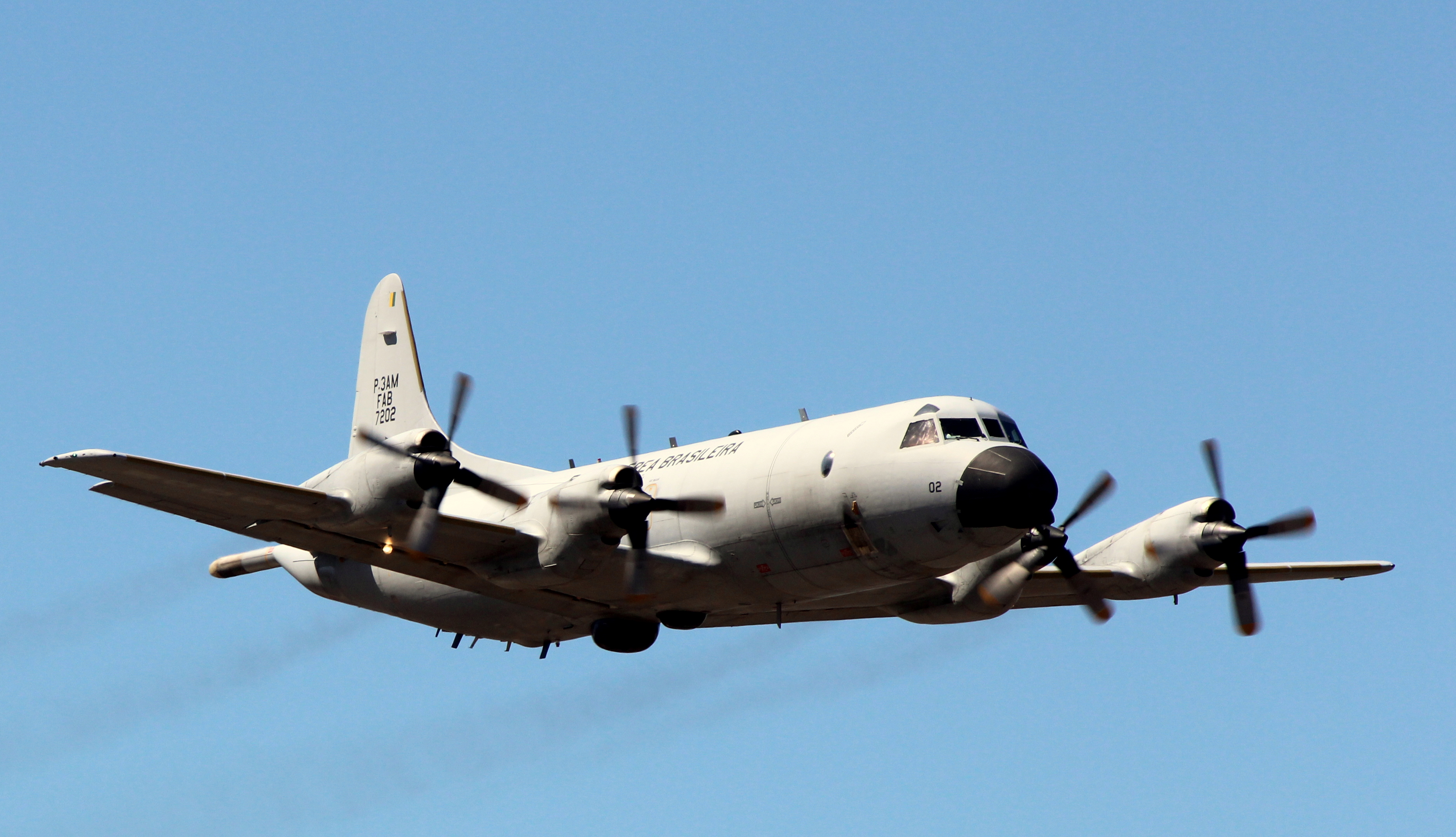
Lockheed P-3AM Orion (FAB)

== See also ==
- List of Brazilian military bases
- Dep. Luis Eduardo Magalhães International Airport
