= Florianópolis Air Force Base =

Air base of the Brazilian Air Force

- Base Aérea de Florianópolis
- Florianópolis, Santa Catarina in Brazil

Site information
- Type: Air Force Base
- Code: BAFL
- Owner: Brazilian Air Force
- Controlled by: Brazilian Air Force
- Open to the public: No
- Website: www.fab.mil.br/organizacoes/mostra/40/BASE%20A%C3%89REA%20DE%20FLORIAN%C3%93POLIS

Location
- Location in Brazil
- Coordinates: 27°40′13″S 048°33′09″W

Site history
- Built: 1923
- In use: 1941-present

Garrison information
- Current commander: Ten. Cel. Av. João Paulo Gomez Lima Da Silva

Airfield information
- Identifiers: IATA: FLN, ICAO: SBFL, LID: SC0001
- Elevation: 5 metres (16 ft) AMSL
Runways
Direction	Length and surface
03/21	1,320 metres (4,331 ft) Concrete
14/32	2,400 metres (7,874 ft) Asphalt

Florianópolis Air Force Base – BAFL (IATA: FLN, ICAO: SBFL) is a base of the Brazilian Air Force, located in Florianópolis, Brazil.

It shares some facilities with Hercílio Luz International Airport.

== History ==
In 1923 the Brazilian Navy created at the present site of the Florianópolis Air Force Base the Center for Air Naval Aviation of Santa Catarina, operating amphibian aircraft.

Between 1927 and 1932, the then known as Campeche Aerodrome was also used by the French aviators of the Compagnie Générale Aéropostale for its operations in Florianópolis. Among them were Jean Mermoz, Antoine de Saint-Exupéry and Henri Guillaumet.

The Air Naval base existed until 1941, when the government changed its jurisdiction to the Brazilian Air Force. It was then that it received its present name.

During World War II the base was dedicated to missions of anti-submarine surveillance in the southern coast of Brazil.

== Units ==
Since January 2017 there are no permanent flying units assigned to Florianópolis Air Force Base. Whenever needed, the aerodrome is used as a support facility to other air units of the Brazilian Air Force, Navy and Army.

Former Units
1972–October 1980: 2nd Squadron of the 10th Aviation Group (2º/10ºGAv) Pelicano. The squadron was moved to Campo Grande Air Force Base.
February 1982–January 2017: 2nd Squadron of the 7th Aviation Group (2º/7ºGAv) Phoenix. The squadron was moved to Canoas Air Force Base.

== Accidents and incidents ==
- June 6, 1949: Brazilian Air Force, a Douglas C-47B-50-DK registration FAB-2023 flying from Florianópolis to Canoas Air Force Base flew into the side of a mountain shortly after take-off and flying into heavy overcast. All 28 passengers and crew died.
- March 13, 1979: Brazilian Air Force, a Grumman SA-16 Albatross registration FAB-6540 crashed in the neighbourhood of Costeira do Pirajuba, near Florianópolis Air Force Base. Five crew members died. The pilot was rescued alive but died a few days later.

== Access ==
The base is located 14 km from downtown Florianópolis.

== Gallery ==
This gallery displays aircraft that have been based at Florianópolis. The gallery is not comprehensive.

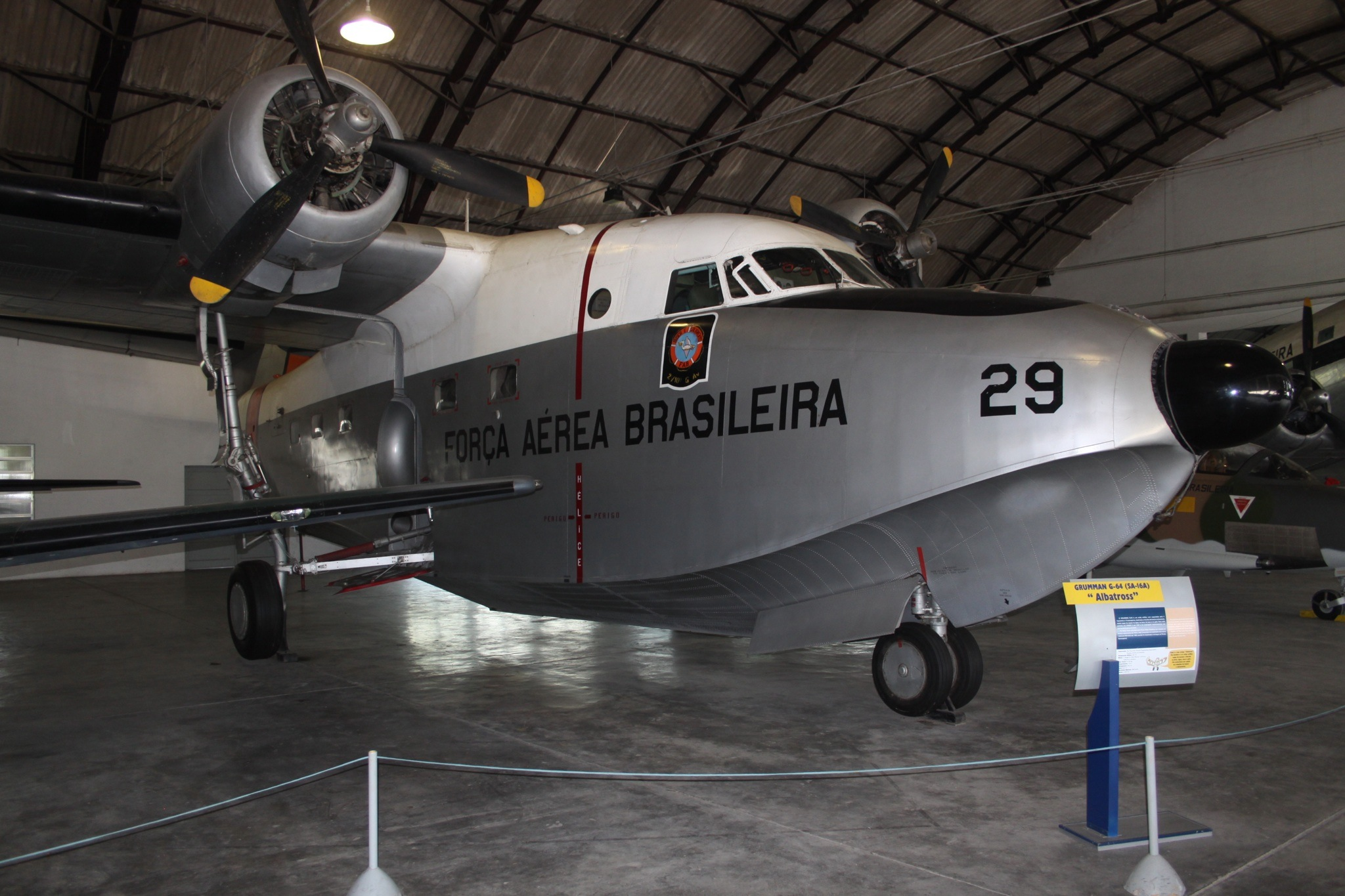
Grumman G-64 Albatross (FAB)

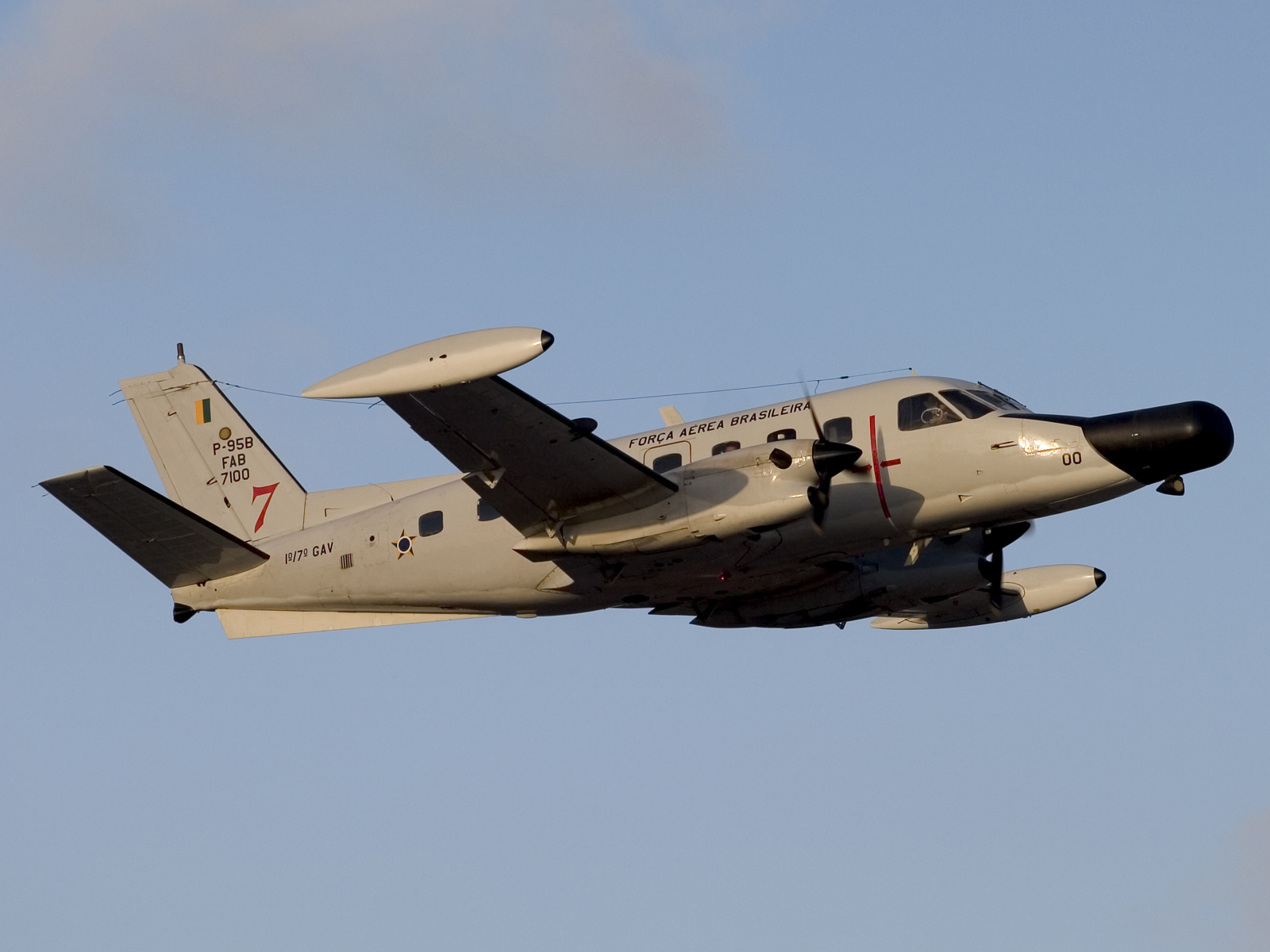
Embraer P-95B Bandeirulha (FAB)

== See also ==
- List of Brazilian military bases
- Hercílio Luz International Airport
