= Brasília International Airport =

International Airport serving Brasília

Brasília–President Juscelino Kubitschek International Airport Aeroporto Internacional de Brasília–Presidente Juscelino Kubitschek

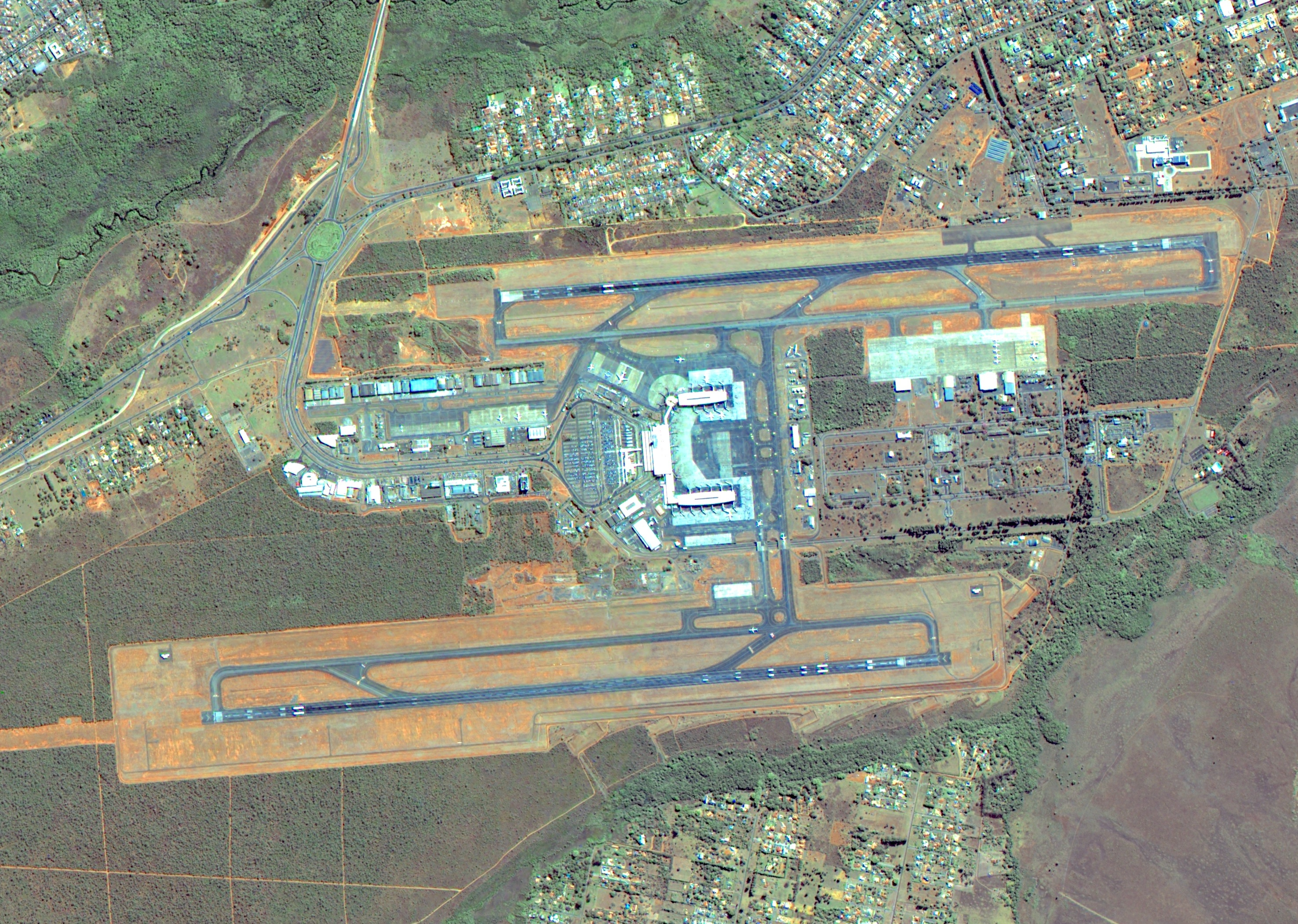
- Satellite view of the airport in 2021
- IATA: BSB; ICAO: SBBR; LID: DF0001

Summary
- Airport type: Public/military
- Operator: Infraero (1973–2012); Inframérica (2012–present)
- Serves: Brasília
- Location: Lago Sul, Brazil
- Opened: 3 May 1957; 69 years ago
- Hub for: Gol Transportes Aéreos; LATAM Brasil
- Time zone: BRT (UTC−03:00)
- Elevation AMSL: 1,066 m (3,497 ft)
- Coordinates: 15°52′16″S 047°55′07″W
- Website: www.bsb.aero

Maps
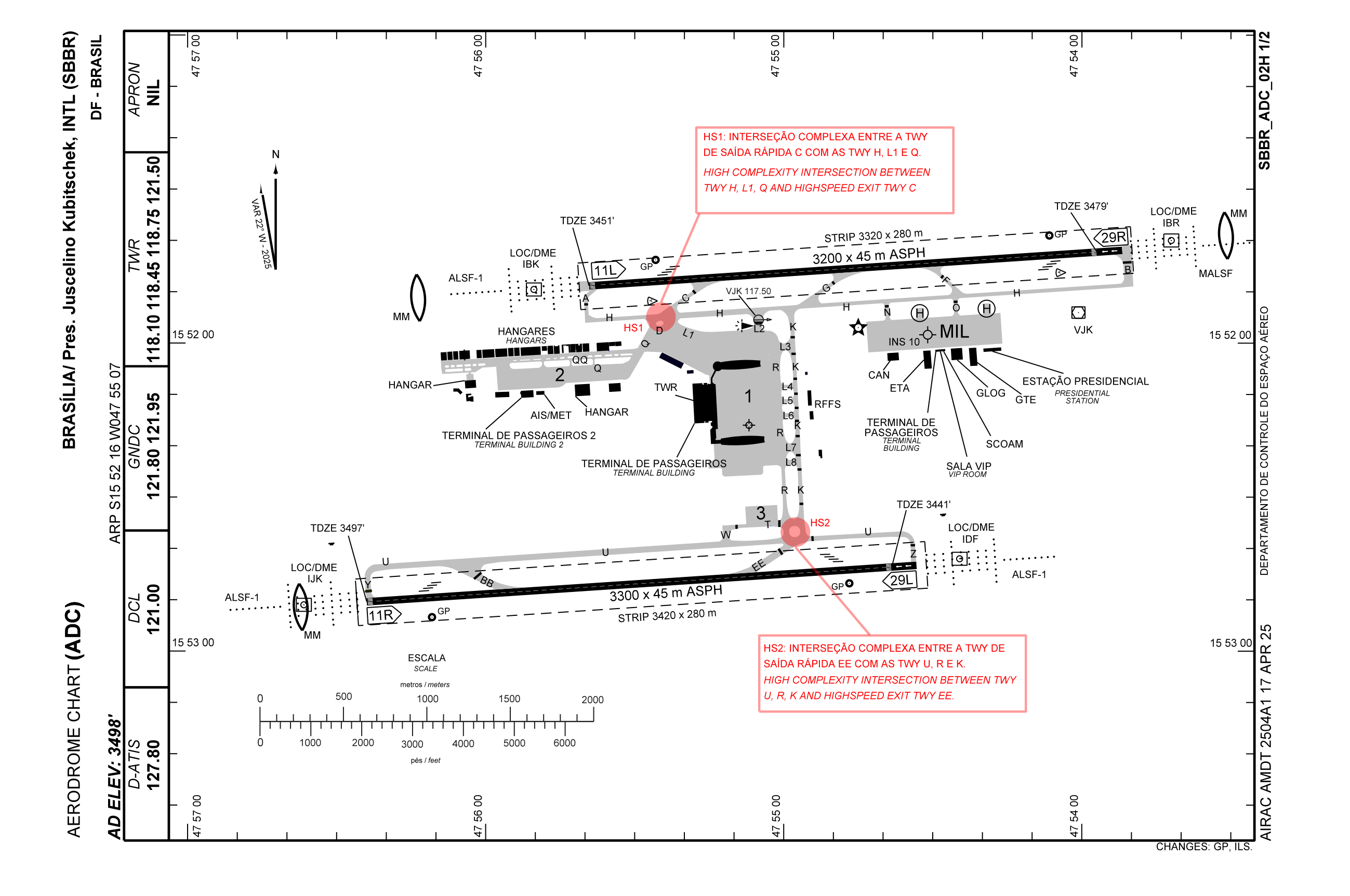
- DECEA airport chart

- Location in the Federal District BSB (Brazil)

Runways
Direction	Length		Surface
Direction	m	ft	Surface
11R/29L	3,300	10,827	Asphalt
11L/29R	3,200	10,499	Asphalt

Statistics (2025)
- Passengers: 16,713,369 ▲10%
- Aircraft Operations: 150,782 ▲7%
- Metric tonnes of cargo: 54,956 ▼1%
- Statistics: Inframérica; Sources: Airport website, ANAC, DECEA

Brasília–President Juscelino Kubitschek International Airport (Portuguese: Aeroporto Internacional de Brasília–Presidente Juscelino Kubitschek) (IATA: BSB, ICAO: SBBR), also known as Brasília International Airport, is the international airport serving Brasília, located in the administrative region of Lago Sul, in the Federal District, 13 kilometers from downtown Brasília. Since April 20, 1999, the airport is named after Juscelino Kubitschek (1902–1976), the 21st President of Brazil. It is operated by Inframerica.

The airport site covers an area of about 2,900 hectares (7,165 acres) of airport property. Some of its facilities are shared with the Brasília Air Force Base of the Brazilian Air Force.

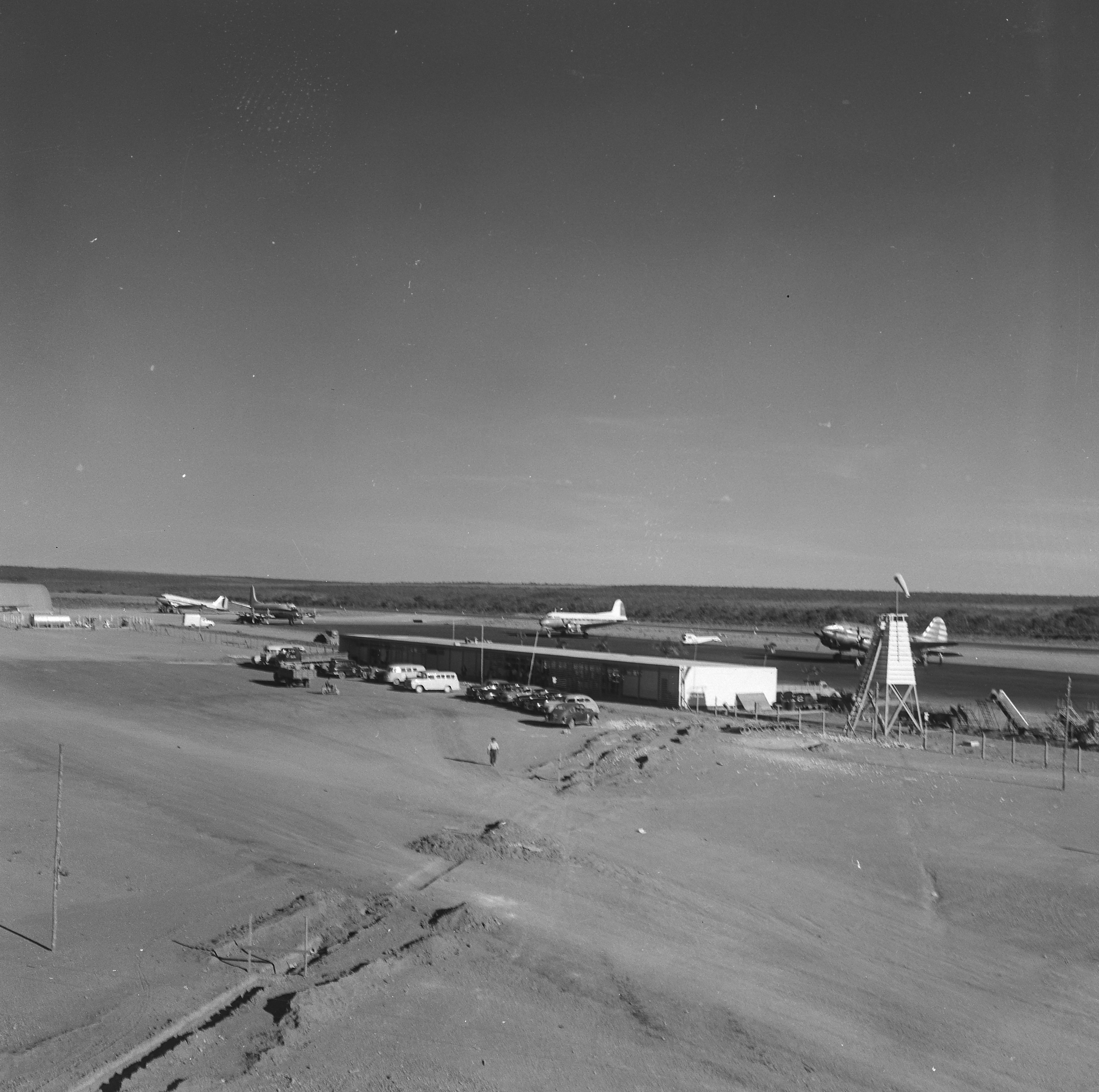
Airport in 1959

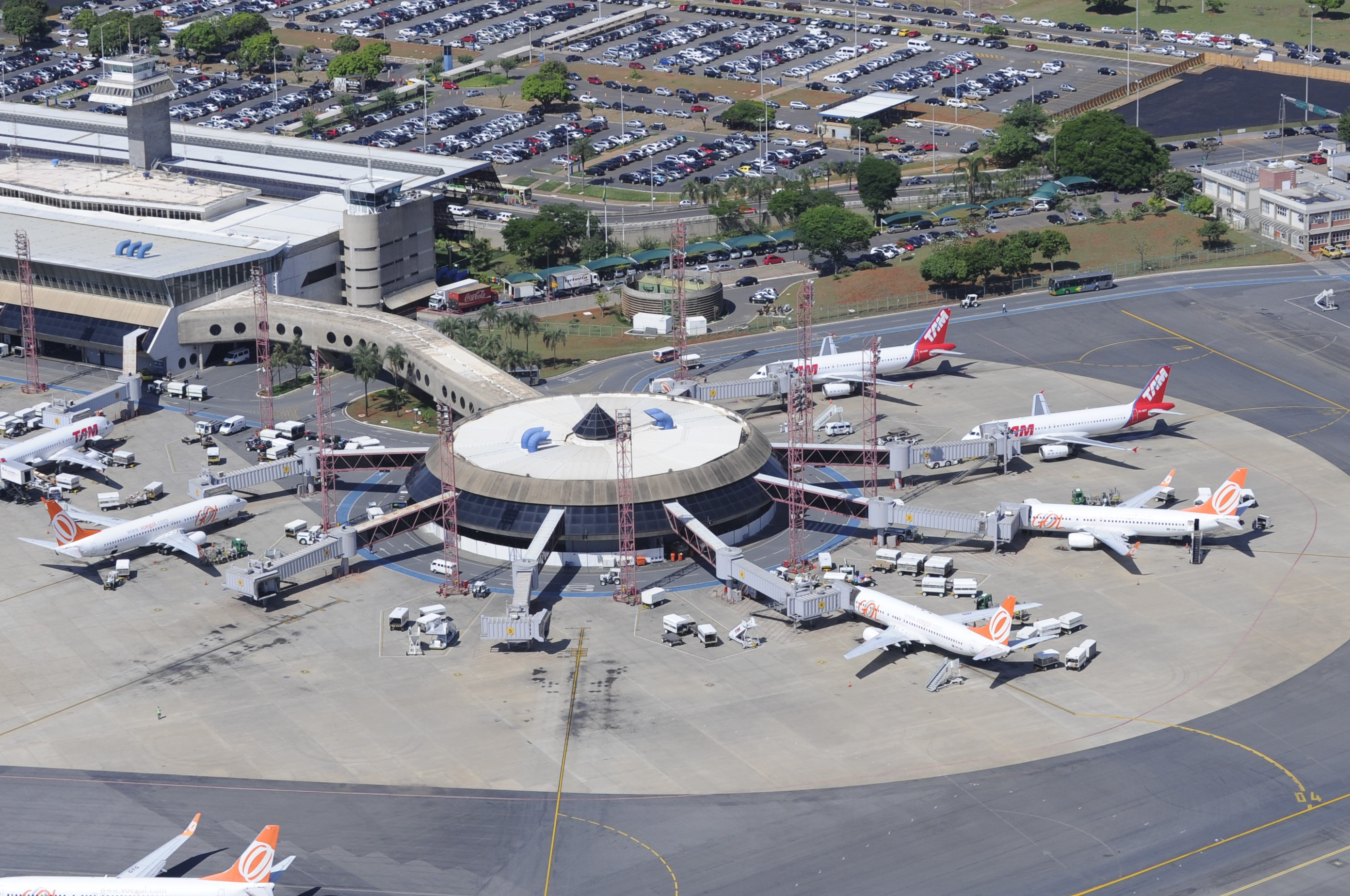
The apron before the expansion

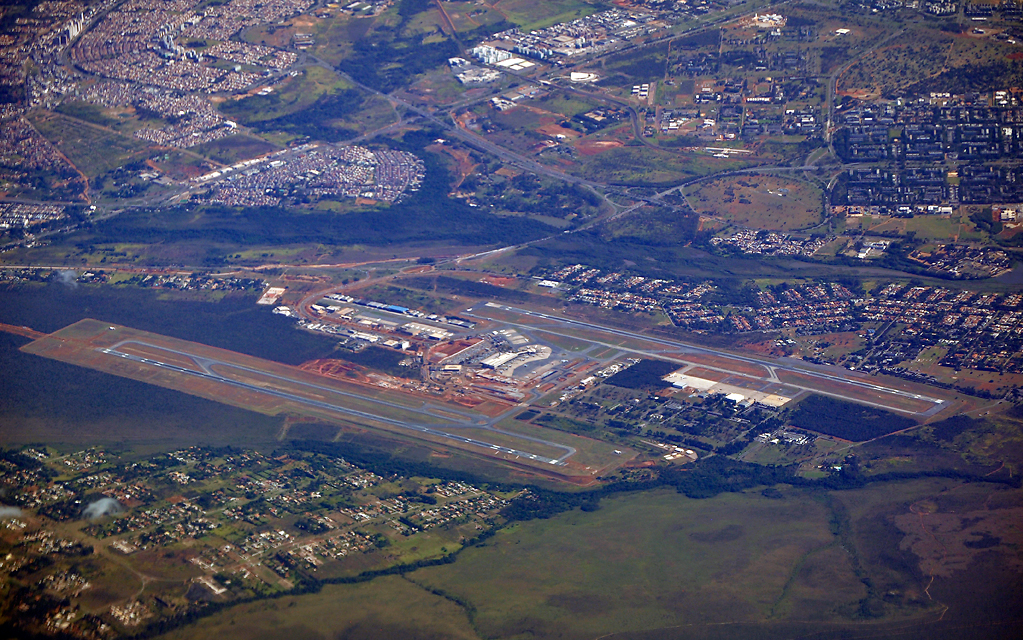
Aerial view in 2014

== History ==
Brasília was only a project when in 1956 President Juscelino Kubitschek landed for the first time in the Central Plateau. Vera Cruz Airport, built in 1955 by the then Deputy-Governor of Goiás, Bernardo Sayão, at the request of the chairman of the location of the New Federal Capital, Marechal José Pessoa, already existed. On 2 October 1955, the airport received the first crew of workers that would build the new capital. This facility was located where today is the Integrated Bus and Train Terminal of Brasília. This facility, however, was only temporary. The relocation to a definitive site had already been identified as a priority and construction work started on 6 November 1956. The work lasted for over six months and required the clearing of an area of 1,334 million square metres (14,360×10^{6} sq ft), 178,500 square metres (1,921,000 sq ft) of earthwork, base-stabilized 40,900 square metres (440,000 sq ft), covering 73,500 square metres (791,000 sq ft), topographical services, positioning and leveling. The runway was designed to have a length of 3,300 metres (10,800 ft) but initially it had only 324 metres (1,063 ft), and was 45 metres (148 ft) wide. The passenger terminal was built of wood. On 2 April 1957, the presidential aircraft landed for the first time at the site, and the official inauguration took place on 3 May 1957. That year, at the same location the Brasília Air Force Base was also commissioned.

In 1965, Oscar Niemeyer proposed a visionary project for Brasília Airport to replace the wooden terminal: circular, with similar outside pillars of Alvorada Palace and subway tunnels to the satellite apron. However, he lost the concession, and due to the 1964 Brazilian coup d'état, the military-government chose to build the project of Tércio Fontana Pacheco, an architect of the Brazilian Air Force Ministry. The airport is thus one of the few important buildings in Brasília that is not related to Niemeyer. This building was opened in 1971.

In 1990, Brasília International Airport underwent its first major renovation and began to gain its present form with a central body and two satellites initially planned, but only one concluded, the west wing. Since 1990, it has been under renovation and expansions, constructed by Camargo Côrrea, following an architectural concept of the architect Sérgio Roberto Parada, with conclusion between 2000 until 2004. The first phase included the construction of an access-viaduct to the passenger terminal and metal cover inaugurated in 1992 and the first circular satellite, inaugurated in 1994, in which its form resembles an ovni disc. In the second phase, the main body of the passenger terminal was refitted to include a shopping-mall and the satellite received nine jetways. In 2005, a second runway was opened.

The former terminal for general aviation originally built in 1988 was again reviewed and transformed into Passenger Terminal 2. It was opened for traffic on 2 August 2010.

On 31 August 2009, Infraero unveiled a BRL514.8 million (US$306.06 million; EUR224.76 million) investment plan to renovate President Juscelino Kubitschek International Airport, focusing on the preparations for the 2014 FIFA World Cup, Brasília being one of the venue cities, and the Summer Olympics in 2016 which were held in Rio de Janeiro, Brazil:

- Enlargement of apron and taxiways (BRL 34.5 million). Completed in April 2013
- Renovation of the existing passenger terminal (BRL 22.5 million). Completed in November 2015
- Enlargement of the passenger terminal (BRL 439 million). Completed in April 2015
- Parking (BRL 18 million). Completed in April 2014

Responding to critiques to the situation of its airports, on May 18, 2011, Infraero released a list evaluating some of its most important airports according to its saturation levels. According to the list, Brasília was considered to be critically saturated, operating above 85% of its capacity.

Following a decision made on 26 April 2011 by the Federal Government for private companies being granted concessions to operate some Infraero airports, on 6 February 2012, the administration of the airport was granted for 25 years to the Consortium Inframérica, formed by the Brazilian Engineering Group Engevix (50%) and the Argentinean Group Corporación América (50%). Infraero, the state-run organization, retains 49% of the shares of the company incorporated for the administration.

Between 2012 and 2014, the consortium INFRAMERICA invested R$1.2 billion: remodeling the terminal, increasing the number of jetways from 13 to 29 and 40 to 70 airplane positions. In April 2014, the South Concourse, which serves domestic flights, was opened. Until April 2014, the terminal was capable of handling 9 million passengers per year, but actually handled around 14 million. With numbers constantly increasing until 2015, with a decline afterwards.

For 2016 until 2022, there were planned investments for the international area, new parking construction, four new hotels in the vicinity, a new business area and other facilities, like a Shopping Mall, but none was realized until middle 2022.

The Brazilian Integrated Air Traffic Control and Air Defense Center section 1 (Cindacta I) is located in the vicinity of the airport.

== Airlines and destinations ==
=== Passenger ===
Airlines	Destinations
Aerolíneas Argentinas	Seasonal: Buenos Aires–Aeroparque
Azul Brazilian Airlines	Belo Horizonte–Confins, Campinas, Recife, São Paulo–Congonhas
Copa Airlines	Panama City–Tocumen
Gol Linhas Aéreas	Aracaju, Araguaína, Belém, Belo Horizonte–Confins, Boa Vista, Bogotá (ends 31 January 2027), Buenos Aires–Aeroparque, Campinas, Cuiabá, Curitiba, Florianópolis, Fortaleza, Goiânia (ends 31 January 2027), João Pessoa, Maceió, Manaus, Marabá, Miami (ends 31 January 2027), Natal, Orlando (ends 31 January 2027), Palmas, Porto Alegre, Porto Velho, Recife, Rio Branco, Rio de Janeiro–Galeão, Rio de Janeiro–Santos Dumont, Salvador da Bahia, São Luís, São Paulo–Congonhas, São Paulo–Guarulhos, Teresina, Vitória; Seasonal: Porto Seguro
LATAM Brasil	Aracaju, Belém, Belo Horizonte–Confins, Boa Vista, Campinas, Campina Grande, Campo Grande, Cuiabá, Curitiba, Florianópolis, Fortaleza, Foz do Iguaçu, Goiânia, João Pessoa, Imperatriz, João Pessoa, Macapá, Maceió, Manaus, Marabá, Natal, Palmas, Porto Alegre, Porto Seguro, Porto Velho, Recife, Ribeirão Preto (begins 22 February 2027), Rio Branco, Rio de Janeiro–Galeão, Rio de Janeiro–Santos Dumont, Salvador da Bahia, Santarém, Santiago de Chile, São José do Rio Preto, São Luís, São Paulo–Congonhas, São Paulo–Guarulhos, Sinop, Teresina, Uberlândia, Vitória; Seasonal: Navegantes
LATAM Perú	Lima
Sky Airline	Seasonal: Santiago de Chile
TAP Air Portugal	Lisbon

=== Destination maps ===
Domestic destinations map
Domestic destinations from Brasília. Red dots represent year-round destinations; green dots represent seasonal destinations; blue dots represent future destinations.

International destinations map
Domestic destinations from Brasília. Red dots represent year-round destinations; green dots represent seasonal destinations; blue dots represent future destinations.

== Statistics ==
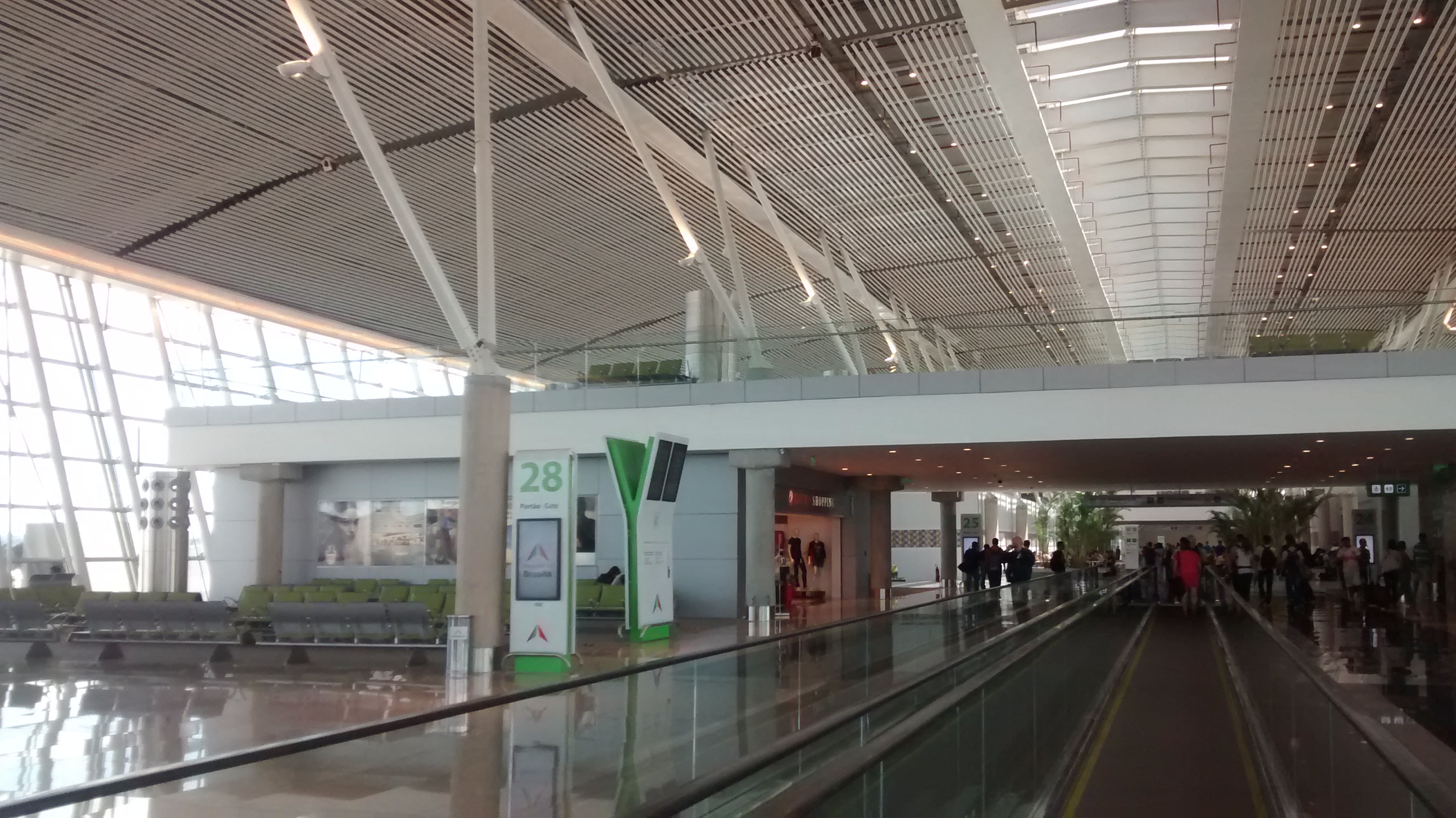
South Concourse of BSB. The concourse is connected to BSB's main terminal and opened in April 2014.

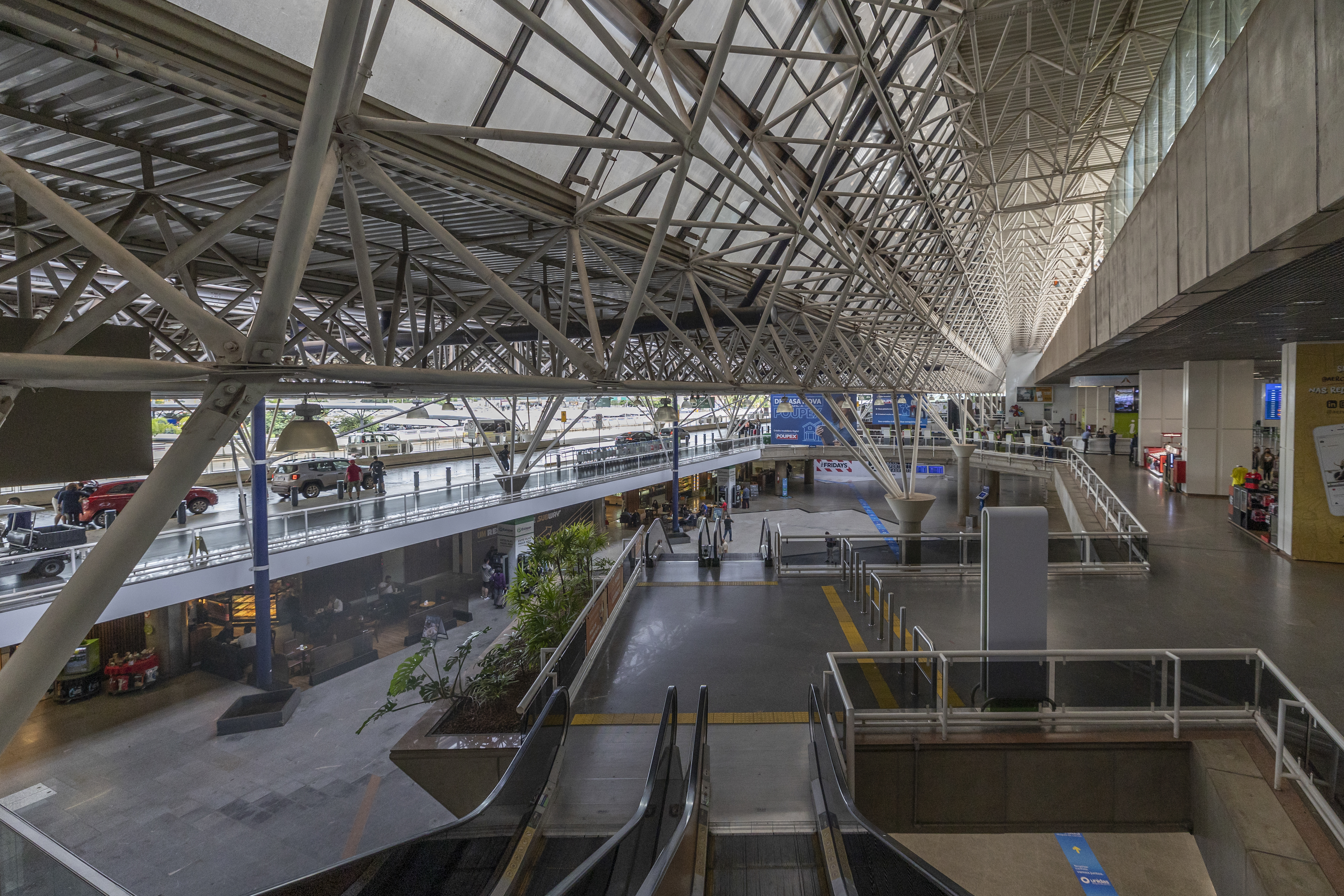
Terminal interior

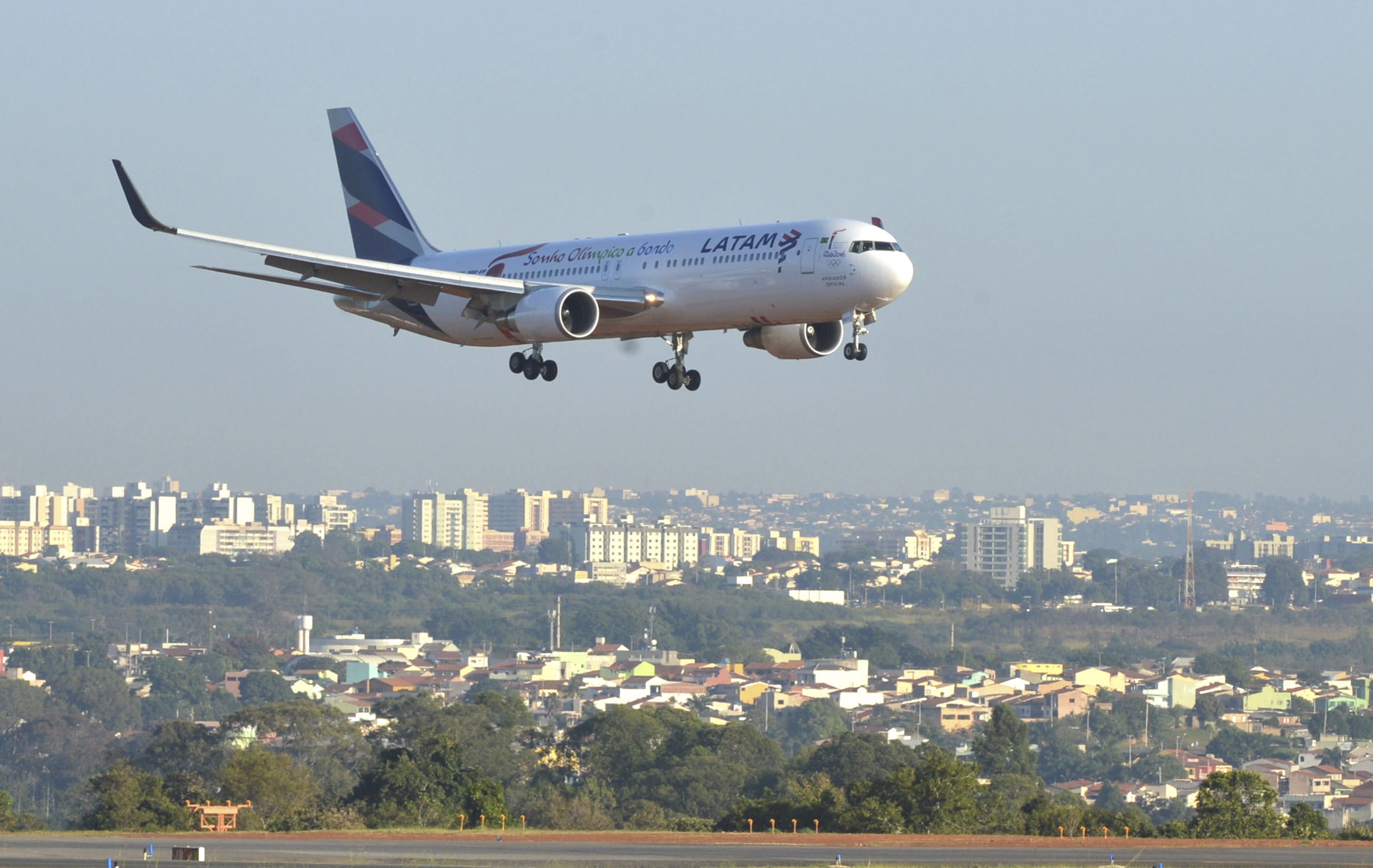
LATAM Brasil aircraft with the Rio 2016 Olympic Torch arriving in Brazil

Following are the number of passenger, aircraft and cargo movements at the airport, according to Infraero (2007-2012) and Inframérica (2013-2025) reports:

Year	Passenger	Aircraft	Cargo (t)
2025	16,713,369 ▲10%	150,782 ▲7%	54,956 ▼1%
2024	15,161,041 ▲2%	140,130	55,778 ▲13%
2023	14,860,880 ▲10%	140,320 ▲11%	49,390 ▲10%
2022	13,471,797 ▲28%	126,432 ▲23%	45,064 ▲7%
2021	10,499,097 ▲34%	102,897 ▲30%	42,203 ▲68%
2020	7,848,297 ▼53%	79,415 ▼45%	25,167 ▼64%
2019	16,727,177 ▼6%	143,772 ▼7%	70,443 ▲35%
2018	17,855,163 ▲6%	153,796 ▲3%	52,219 ▲6%
2017	16,912,680 ▼6%	148,619 ▼8%	49,036 ▲10%
2016	17,947,153 ▼9%	161,167 ▼14%	44,398 ▼4%
2015	19,821,796 ▲9%	186,377 ▲1%	46,337 ▼3%
2014	18,146,405 ▲10%	183,874 ▲2%	47,780 ▼8%
2013	16,489,987 ▲4%	179,656 ▼5%	51,986 ▼16%
2012	15,891,530 ▲3%	188,528 ▼1%	62,055 ▲54%
2011	15,398,737 ▲7%	189,570 ▲8%	40,407 ▲24%
2010	14,347,061 ▲17%	176,326 ▲9%	32,651 ▼35%
2009	12,213,825 ▲17%	162,349 ▲15%	50,388 ▼11%
2008	10,443,393 ▼6%	141,477 ▲12%	56,619 ▼18%
2007	11,119,872	126,853	69,170

Busiest Domestic Routes from BSB 2024
Rank	Airport	Passengers
1	São Paulo–Congonhas	2,416,761
2	São Paulo–Guarulhos	1,182,98
3	Rio de Janeiro–Galeão	788,273
4	Belo Horizonte–Confins	761,351
5	Recife	709,555
6	Salvador da Bahia	629,778
7	Fortaleza	547,459
8	Rio de Janeiro–Santos Dumont	533,561
9	Campinas	507,770
10	Manaus	461,503

== Accidents and incidents ==
- 22 December 1962: a Varig Convair CV-240 registered as PP-VCQ, flying from Belo Horizonte-Pampulha to Brasília descended below the prescribed altitude while on final approach to Brasília, struck trees, skidded and fell to one side. One crew member died.
- 25 April 1970: a VASP Boeing 737-200 in route from Brasília to Manaus-Ponta Pelada was hijacked by a person who demanded to be flown to Cuba. The hijack lasted a day.
- 14 May 1970: a VASP Boeing 737-200 in route from Brasília to Manaus-Ponta Pelada was hijacked by a person who demanded to be flown to Cuba. Duration was one day.
- 22 February 1975: a VASP Boeing 737-200 registered as PP-SMU, in route from Goiânia to Brasília was hijacked by a person who demanded ransom. The hijacker was taken down.
- 25 May 1982: VASP Flight 234, a Boeing 737-2A1 registered as PP-SMY, made a hard landing with nose gear first at Brasília during rainy weather. The gear collapsed and the aircraft skidded off the runway breaking in two. Two passengers out of 118 occupants died.
- 18 March 1991: an Air Conesul Táxi Aéreo Learjet 25 crashed during a nighttime approach 8 km (5mls) from the airport. All four occupants were killed.

== Access ==
The airport is located 13 km (8 mi) from downtown Brasília, in the administrative region of Lago Sul. Regular buses, numbers 102 and 102.1, are frequent and link the airport to the main bus terminal at Rodoviária, from where travelers can catch buses or the subway to other parts of the city. The airport is also served by taxis.

== See also ==
- List of airports in Brazil
- Brasília Air Force Base
