= Brasília Air Force Base =

Air base of the Brazilian Air Force

- Base Aérea de Brasília
- Lago Sul, Federal District in Brazil
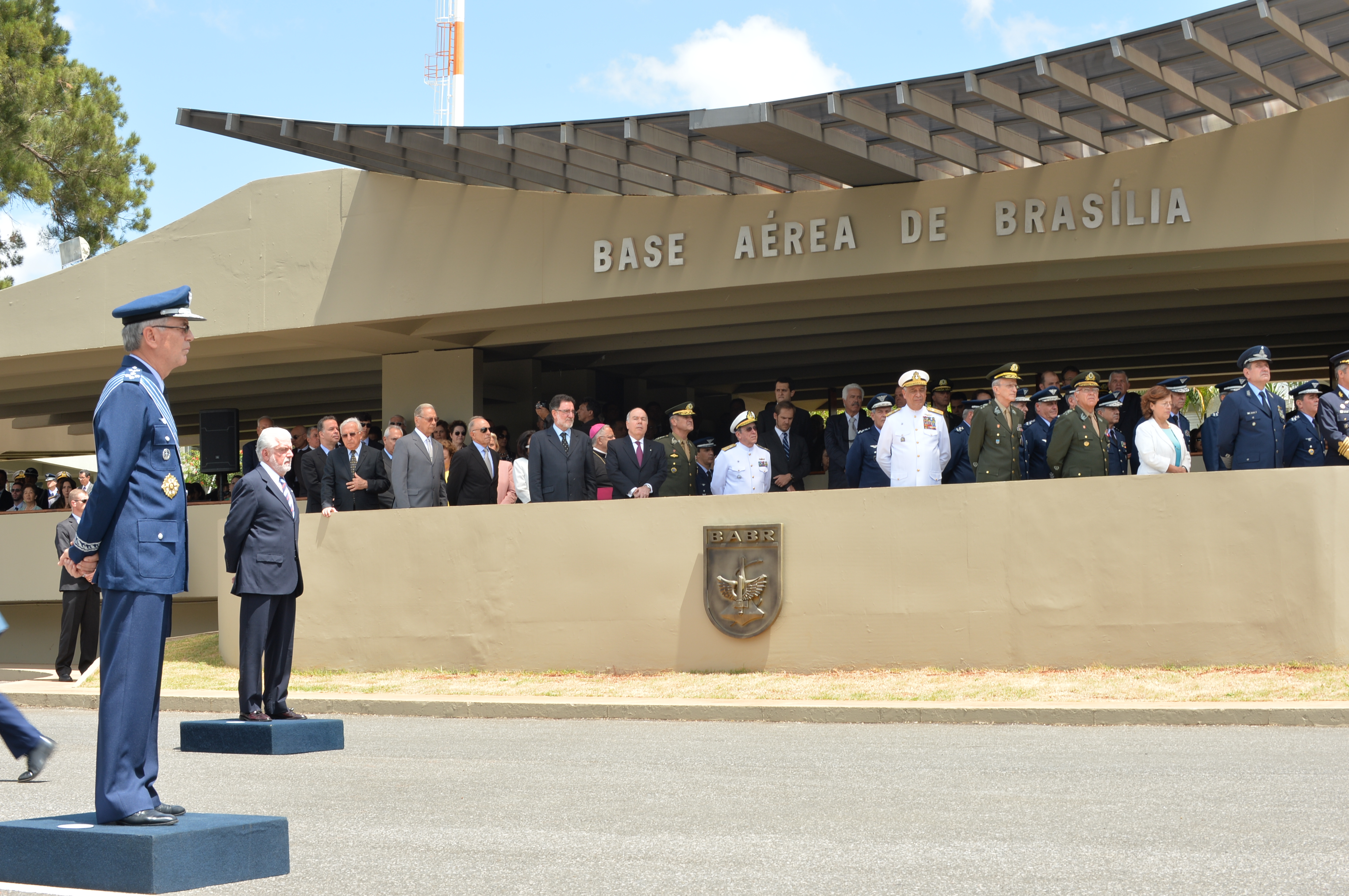
- Ceremony at Brasília in 2015

Site information
- Type: Air Force Base
- Code: ALA1
- Owner: Brazilian Air Force
- Controlled by: Brazilian Air Force
- Open to the public: No
- Website: www.fab.mil.br/organizacoes/mostra/451

Location
- Location in Brazil SBBR (Brazil)
- Coordinates: 15°52′09″S 047°55′15″W

Site history
- Built: 1957
- In use: 1964-present

Garrison information
- Current commander: Brig. José Ricardo de Meneses Rocha
- Occupants: Special Transportation Group; 6th Squadron of Air Transportation

Airfield information
- Identifiers: IATA: BSB, ICAO: SBBR, LID: DF0001
- Elevation: 1,066 metres (3,497 ft) AMSL
Runways
Direction	Length and surface
11R/29L	3,300 metres (10,827 ft) Asphalt
11L/29R	3,200 metres (10,499 ft) Asphalt

Brasília Air Force Base – ALA1 (IATA: BSB, ICAO: SBBR) is a base of the Brazilian Air Force that operates next to the Brasília-President Juscelino Kubitschek International Airport. It was created on December 3, 1963, and is known throughout Brazil for being the base of operations for the Brazilian Presidential Airplane, which is the main aircraft responsible for transporting the President of Brazil.

== History ==
The origin of the Base goes back to 27 November 1957 when President Juscelino Kubitschek signed the decree 42,697 establishing the Brasília Detachment of Air Force Base. However, it was only on 4 December 1963, with Decree 53,077 that Brasília Air Force Base on its own right was created. Dedication took place on 1 January 1964.

== Units ==
The following units are based at Brasília Air Force Base:

- Special Transportation Group (GTE), using the VC-1, the VC-2, the VC-99A/C-99A, the VH-35, and the VH-36 Caracal.
- 6th Squadron of Air Transportation (6°ETA) Guará, using the C-95BM & CM Bandeirante, the C-98A Grand Caravan, the C-97 Brasília, and the U-100 Phenom.

== Access ==
The base is located 11 km from downtown Brasília.

== Gallery ==
This gallery displays aircraft that are or have been based at Brasília Air Force Base. The gallery is not comprehensive.

=== Present aircraft ===
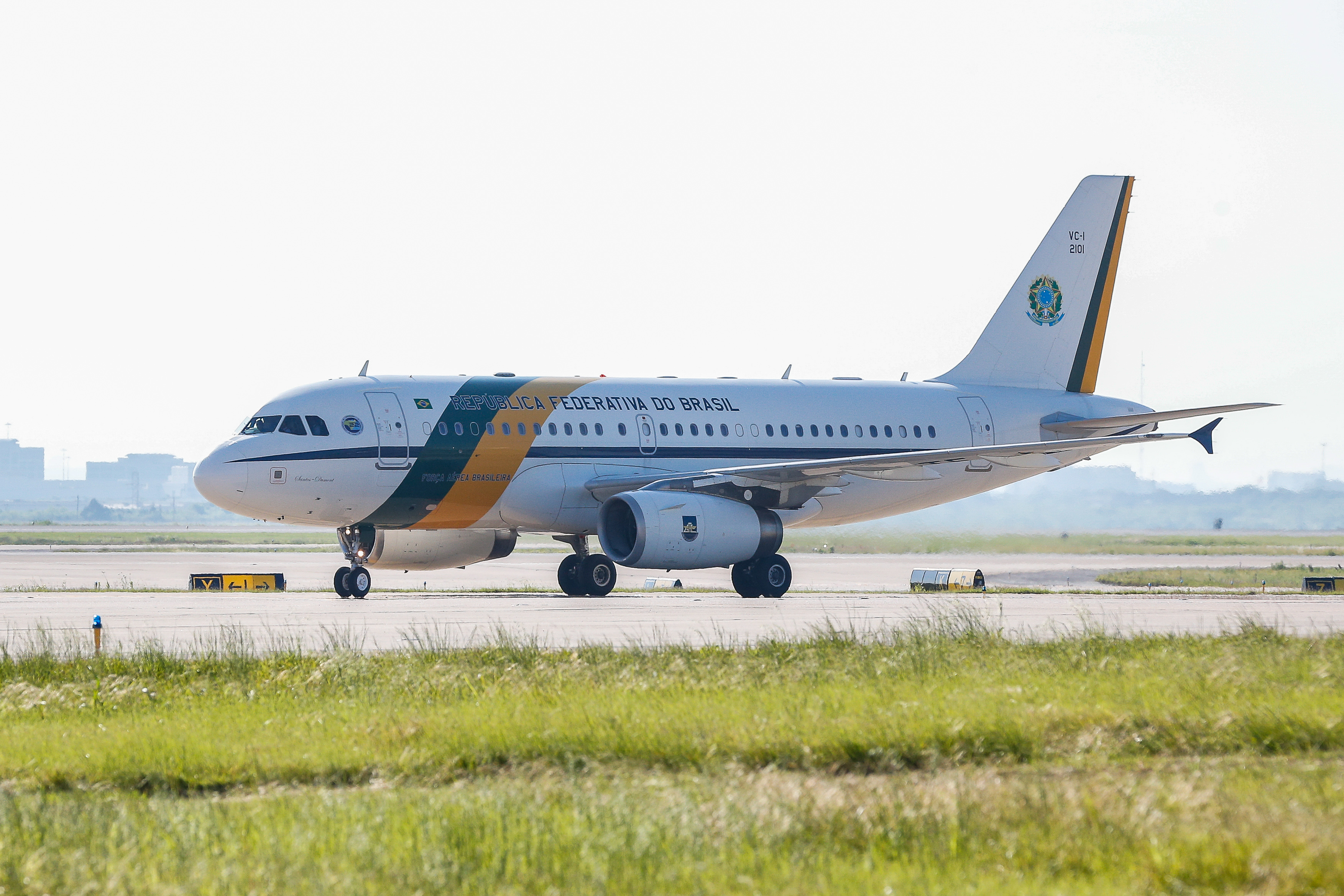
Airbus VC-1

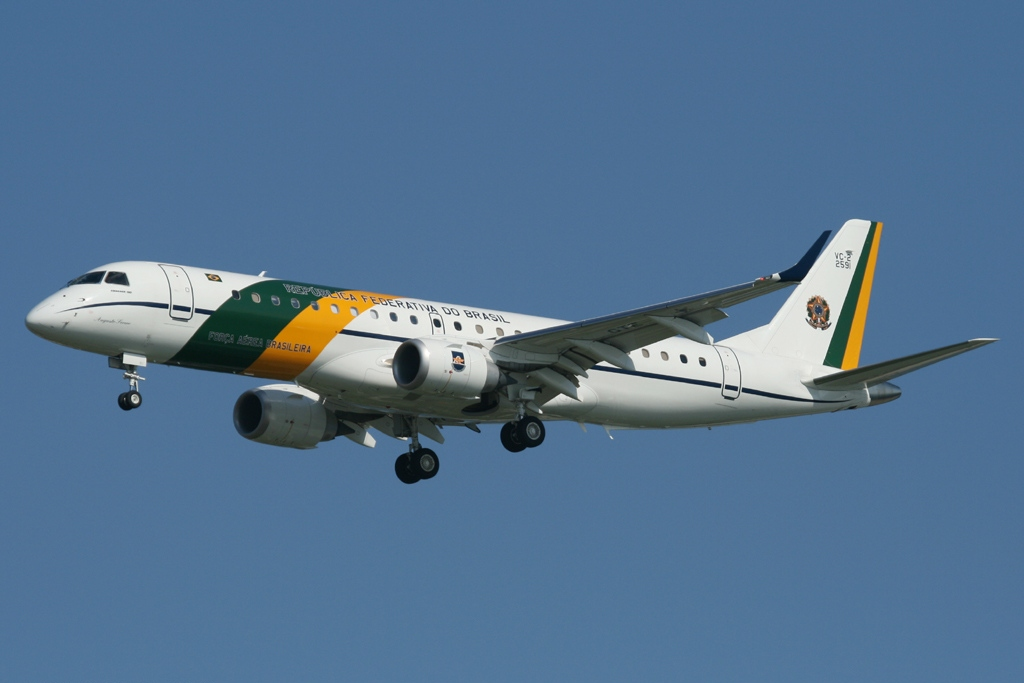
Embraer VC-2

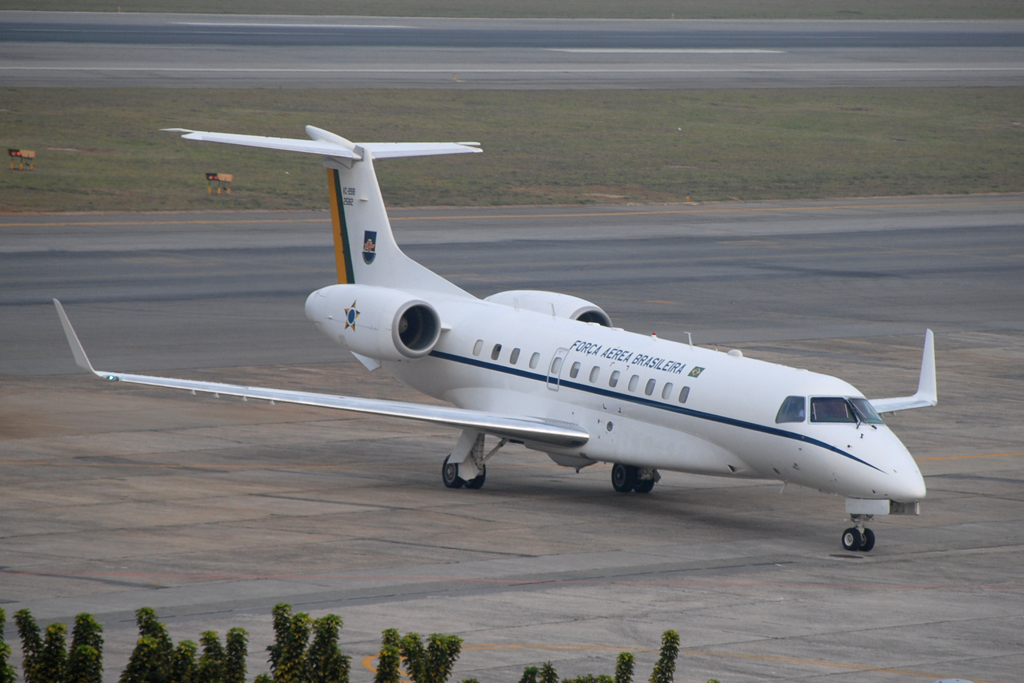
Embraer VC-99A/C-99A

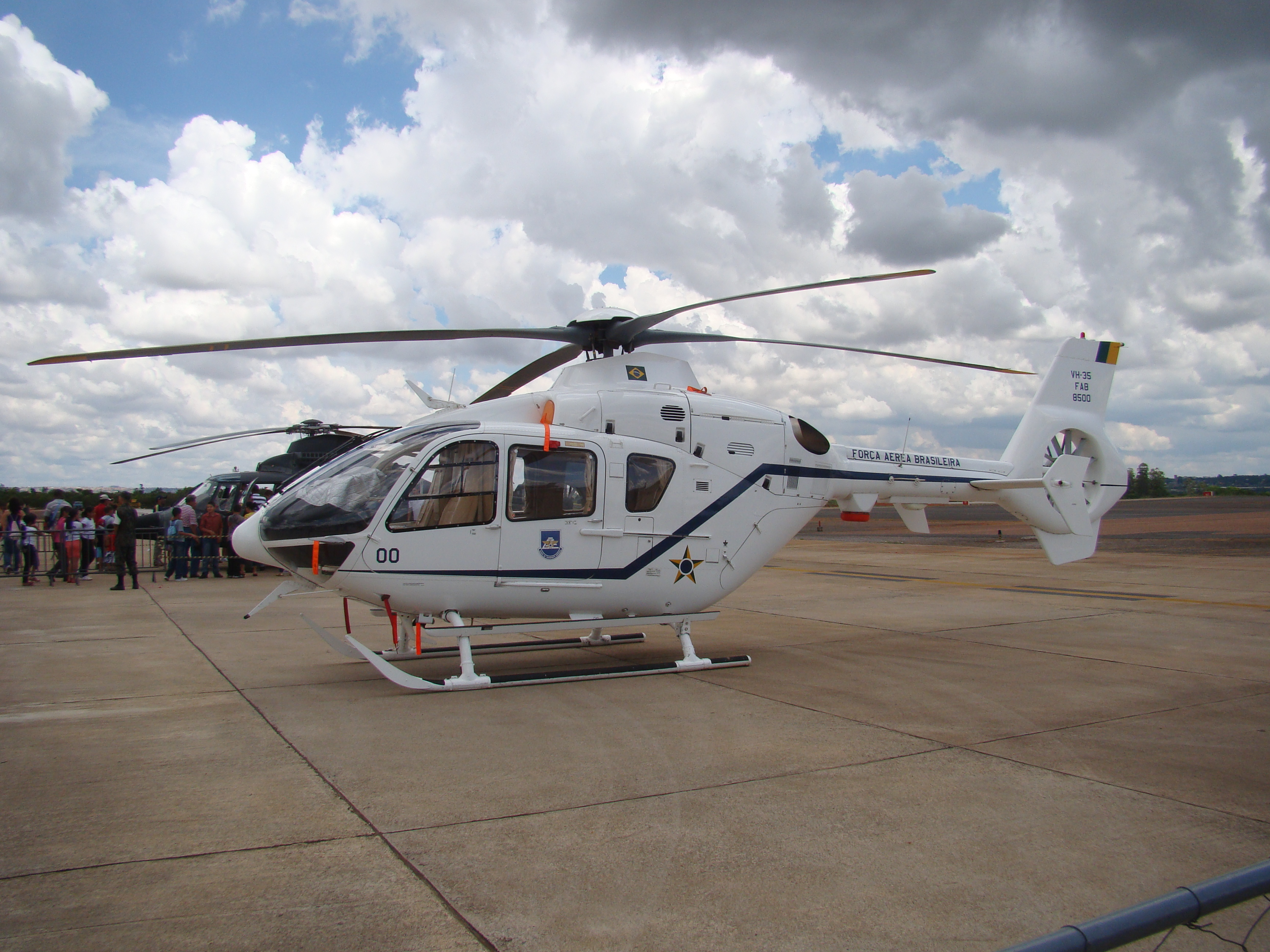
Eurocpter VH-35

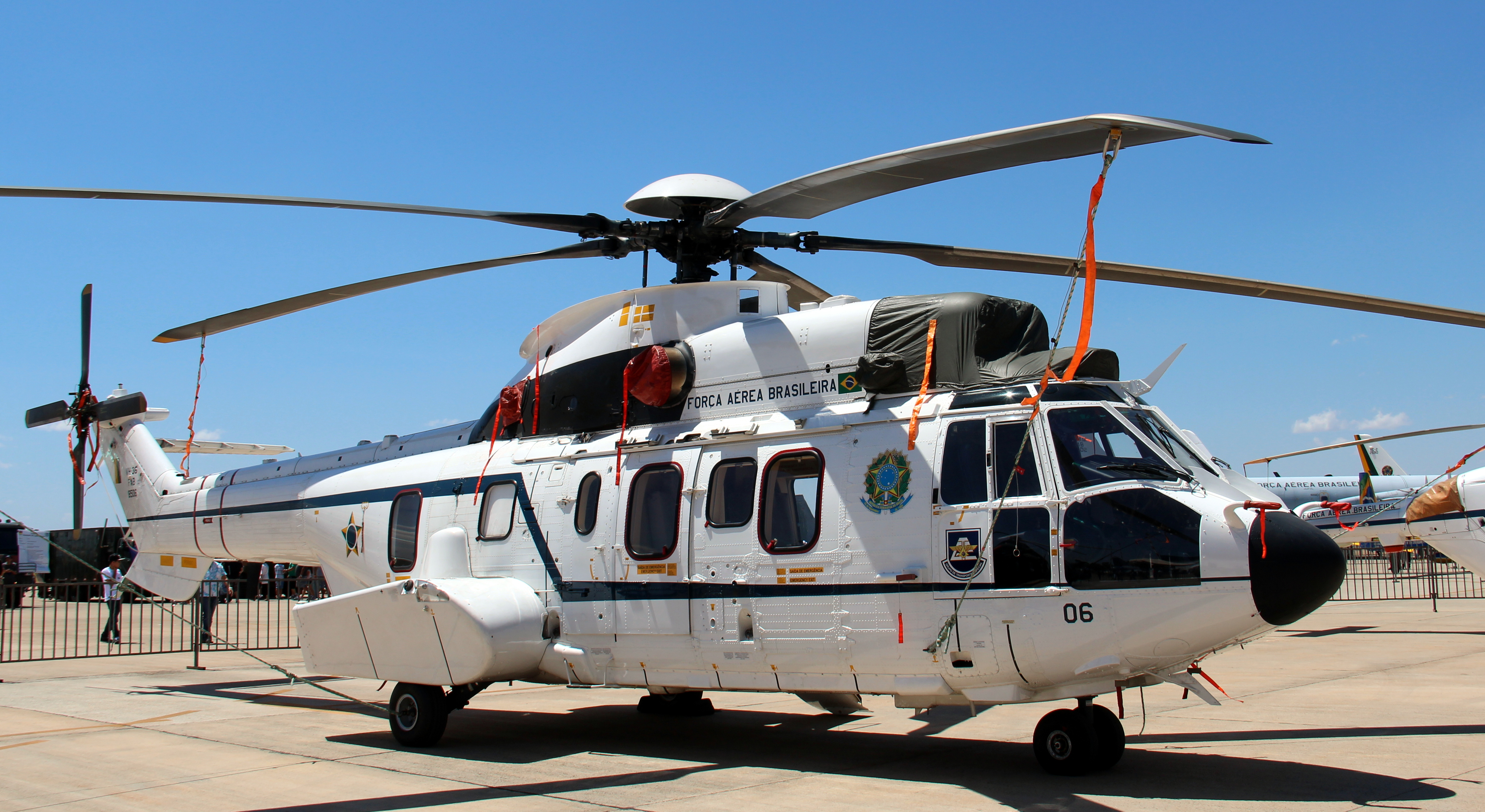
Helibrás VH-36 Caracal

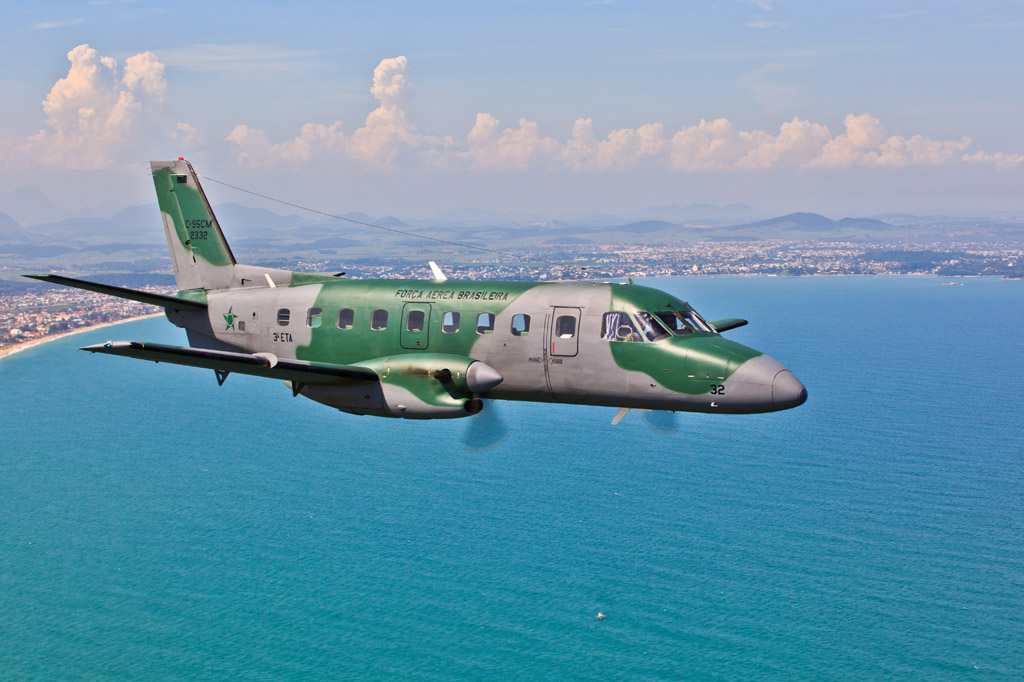
Embraer C-95B Bandeirante

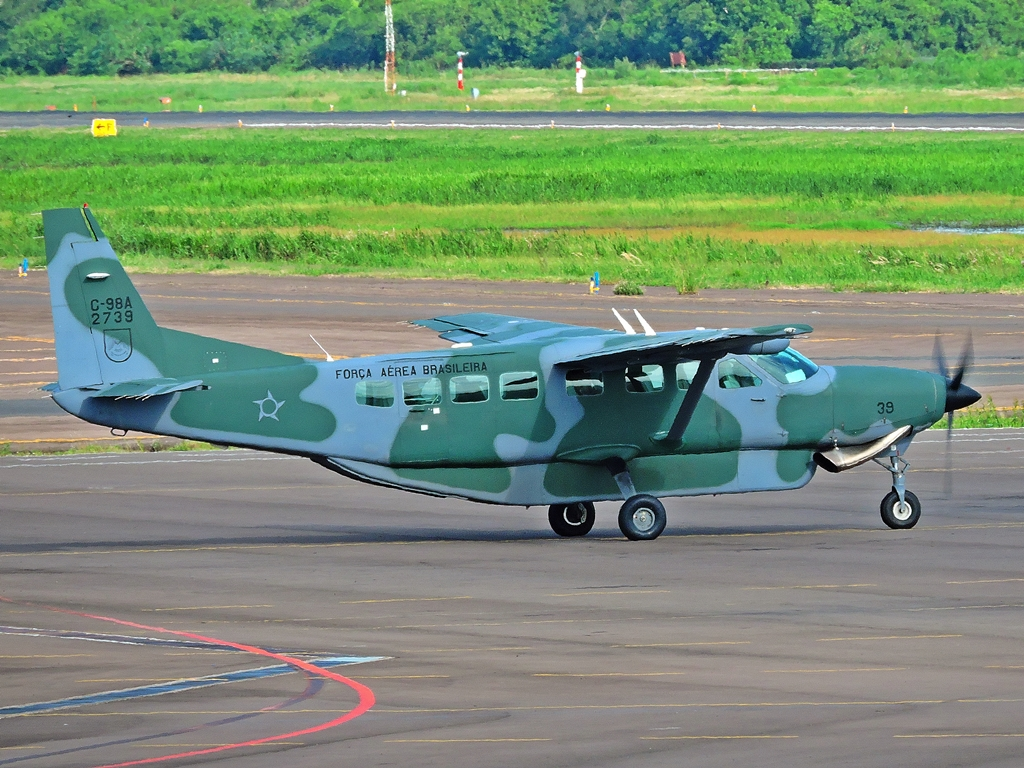
Cessna C-98A Caravan

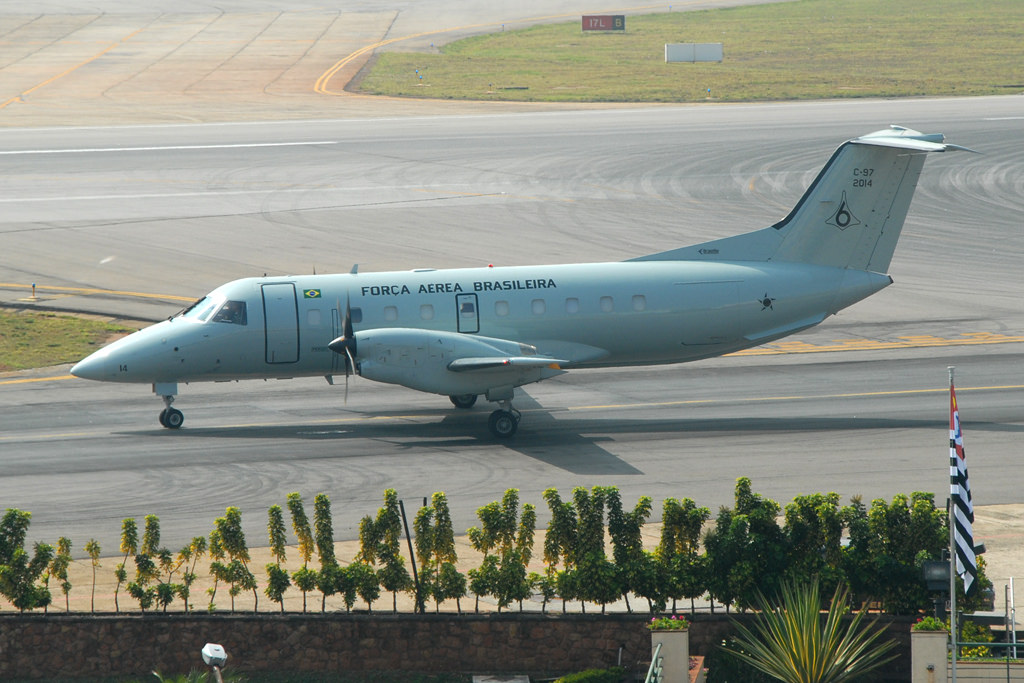
Embraer C-97 Brasília

=== Retired aircraft ===
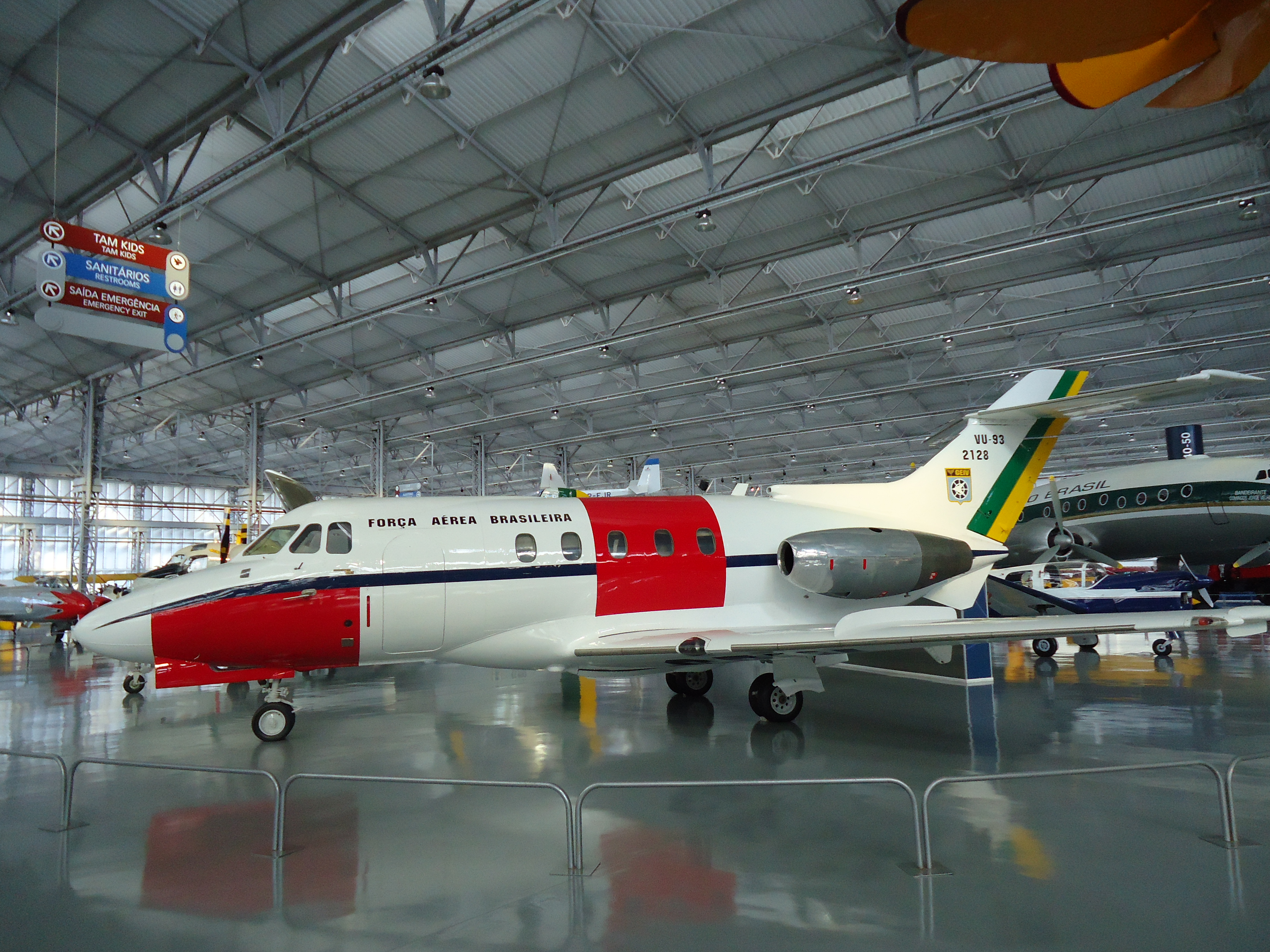
BAe VU-93 Dominie

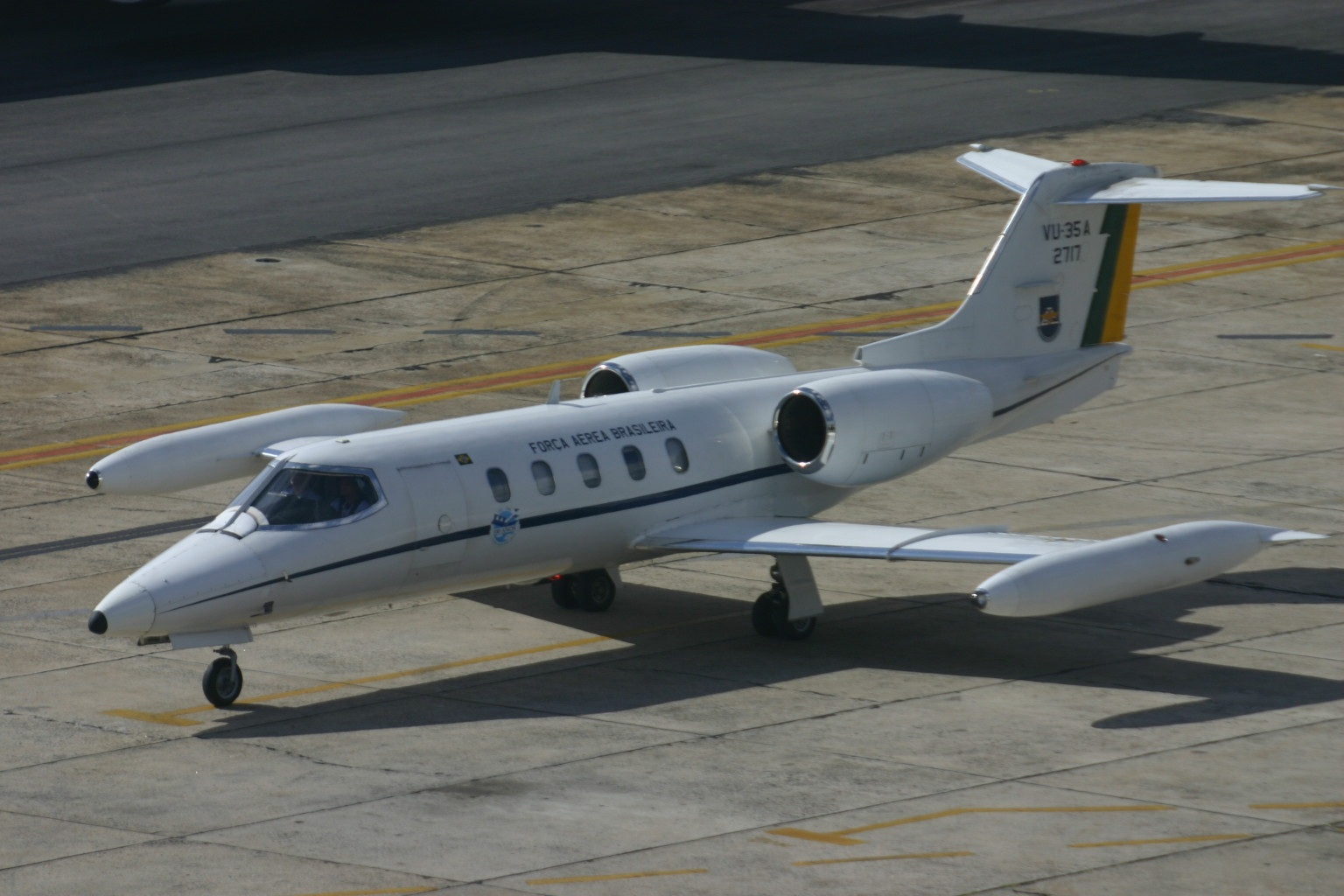
Gates VU-35/U-35 Learjet

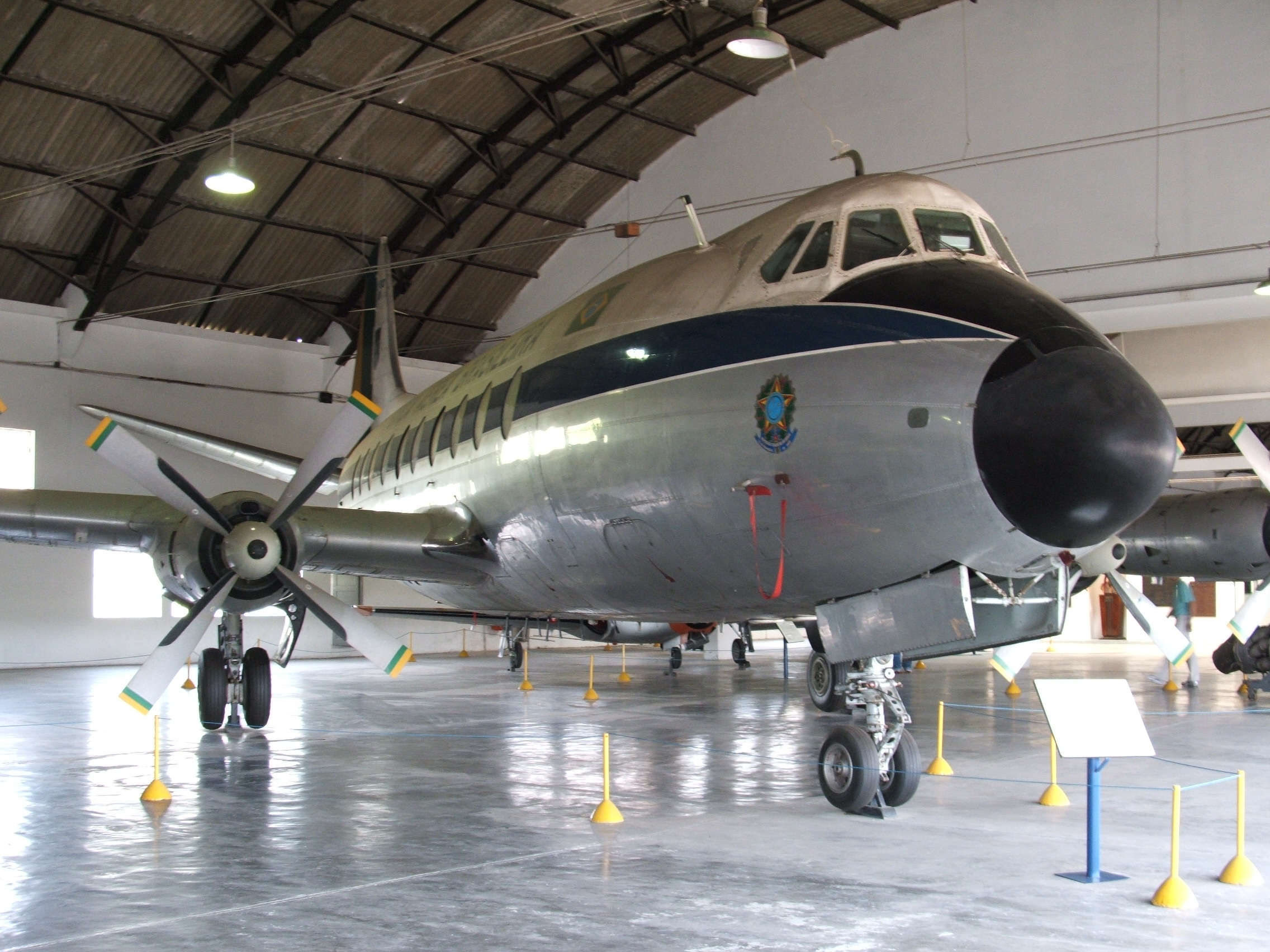
Vickers VC-90 Viscount

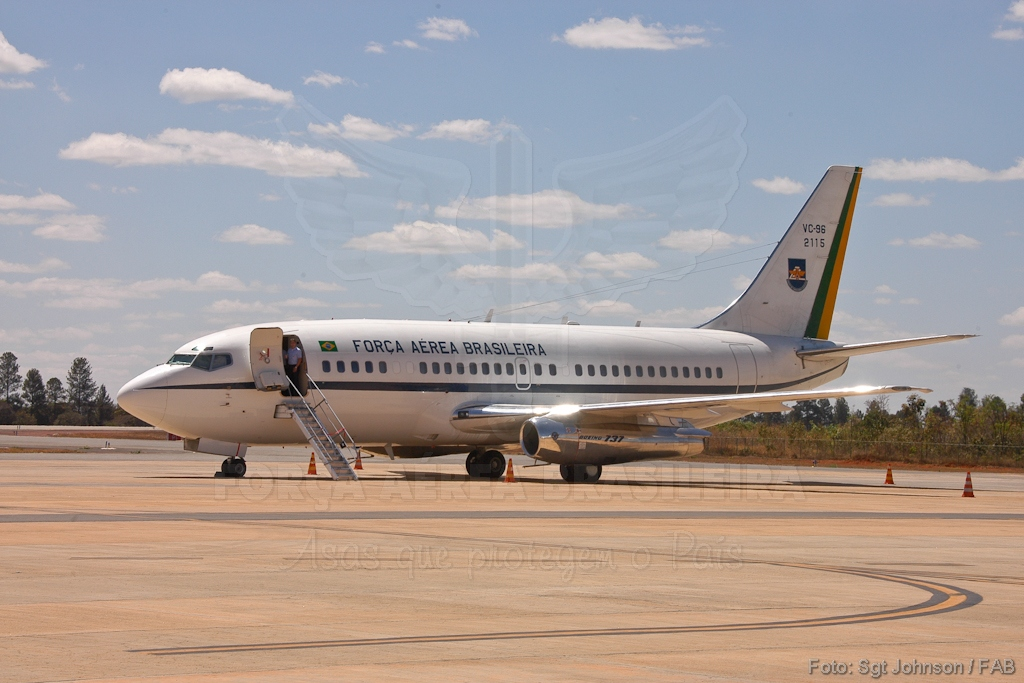
Boeing VC-96

== See also ==
- List of Brazilian military bases
- Brasília–Pres. Juscelino Kubitschek International Airport
