= Cachimbo Airport =

Airport in Pará, Brazil

Cachimbo Airport Aeroporto de Cachimbo
- IATA: none; ICAO: SBCC

Summary
- Airport type: Military: Airport; Testing and training
- Operator: Brazilian Air Force
- Serves: Serra do Cachimbo
- Built: 1950
- In use: 1954–present
- Time zone: BRT (UTC−03:00)
- Elevation AMSL: 537 m (1,762 ft)
- Coordinates: 09°20′02″S 054°57′55″W
- Website: http://www.cpbv.aer.mil.br/

Map
- Location in Brazil

Runways
Direction	Length		Surface
Direction	m	ft	Surface
12/30	2,599	8,527	Asphalt
- Sources: Military Base Website; Brazilian Air Force

Cachimbo Airport (ICAO: SBCC) is the military airport serving Campo de Provas Brigadeiro Velloso, a large Testing and Training complex of the Brazilian Armed Forces located in Serra do Cachimbo (English: Smoking pipe Mountains), in the southern part of the state of Pará, Brazil. It is operated by the Brazilian Air Force.

== History and development ==
The Testing and Training Complex of Campo de Provas Brigadeiro Velloso has an area of 21,588 km^{2} and a perimeter of 653 km. It is within the limits of four municipalities: Altamira, Itaituba, Jacareacanga and Novo Progresso, in an area comparable in size to the Brazilian state of Sergipe.

The airport and the complex have their origins in an airfield opened on September 3, 1950. With the end of World War II, the Brazilian government saw the need for a strategic support facility to the operation of aircraft flying between the Northern Region (location of the Amazon rainforest) and the Southeast Region of Brazil (the locations of Rio de Janeiro and São Paulo), flying on a straight route. Before the construction of the airfield, the link was only possible to be operated with safety following the longer coastline route. The airfield was officially commissioned on January 20, 1954.

In the 1970s studies were made in order to upgrade the facility to a Center for Testing Weapons and Training of the Brazilian Armed Forces, with the purpose of weapons development, bomb tests, experiments, training and maneuvers of national interest. Indeed, on March 7, 1983, the Campo de Testes do Cachimbo (English: Cachimbo Testing Range), subordinated to the Brazilian General Command for Aerospace Technology was created. On January 17, 1995, the name of the complex was changed to Campo de Provas Brigadeiro-do-Ar Haroldo Coimbra Velloso, it was named after the commander who set-up the whole infra-structure of the complex. The name was changed again on July 30, 1997 to Campo de Provas Brigadeiro Velloso.

On August 18, 1979, its new renovated airfield was opened and given the name of Cachimbo Airport. The apron of the airport is large enough for up to 20 small aircraft with full support and maintenance facilities. One unit of the Amazon Surveillance System is also located at the airport.

== Accidents and incidents ==
On 29 September 2006, a damaged executive Embraer Legacy 600 performed an emergency landing at Cachimbo Airport, after having damaged its wing in a mid-air collision with a Gol Transportes Aéreos Boeing 737-800 operating as Flight 1907. The Boeing subsequently crashed in the jungle, killing all 154 people on board.

== Access ==
The airport is located approximately 15 km from highway BR-163.

== See also ==
- List of the busiest airports in Brazil
