= Lago Sul =

- Administrative region
- Região Administrativa de Lago Sul; Administrative Region of Lago Sul
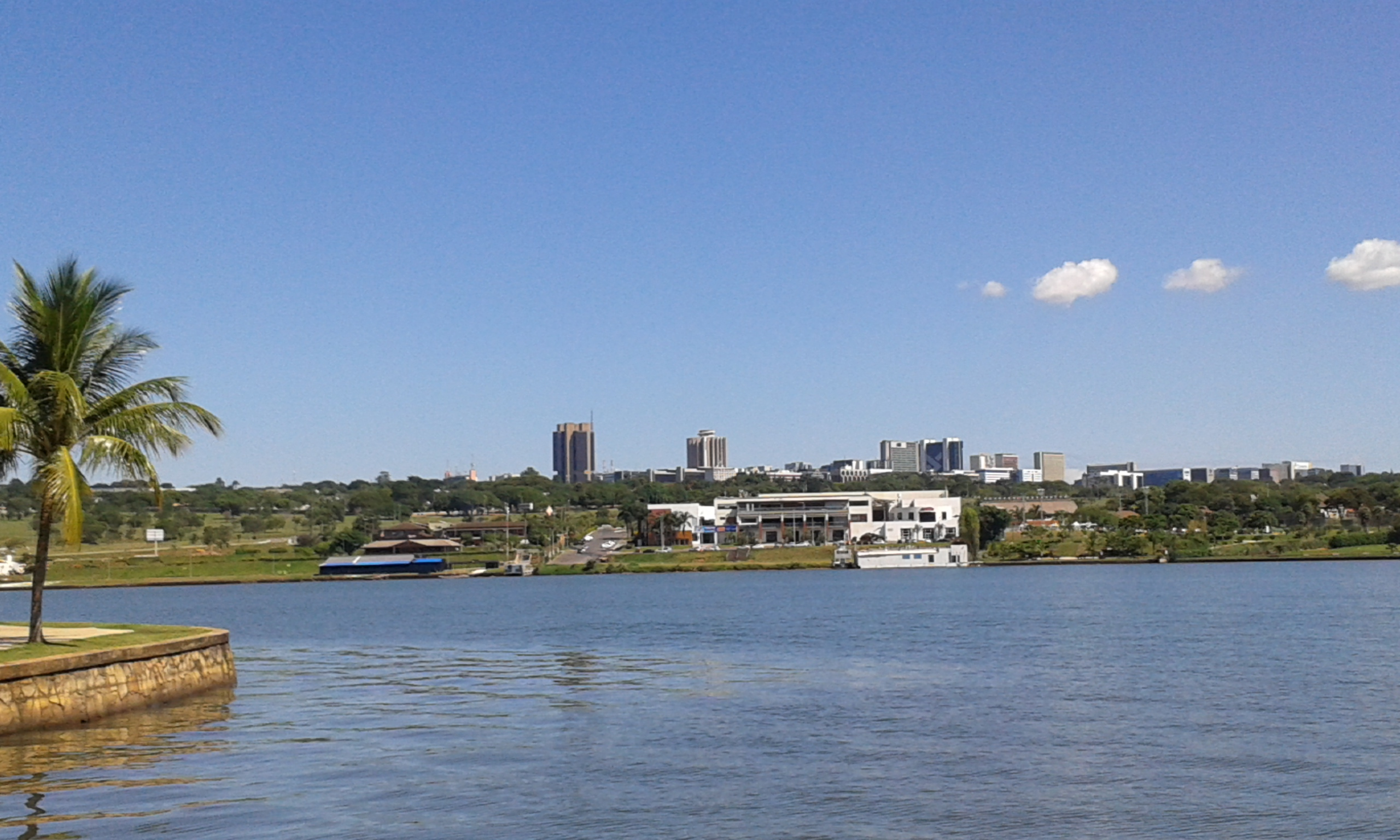
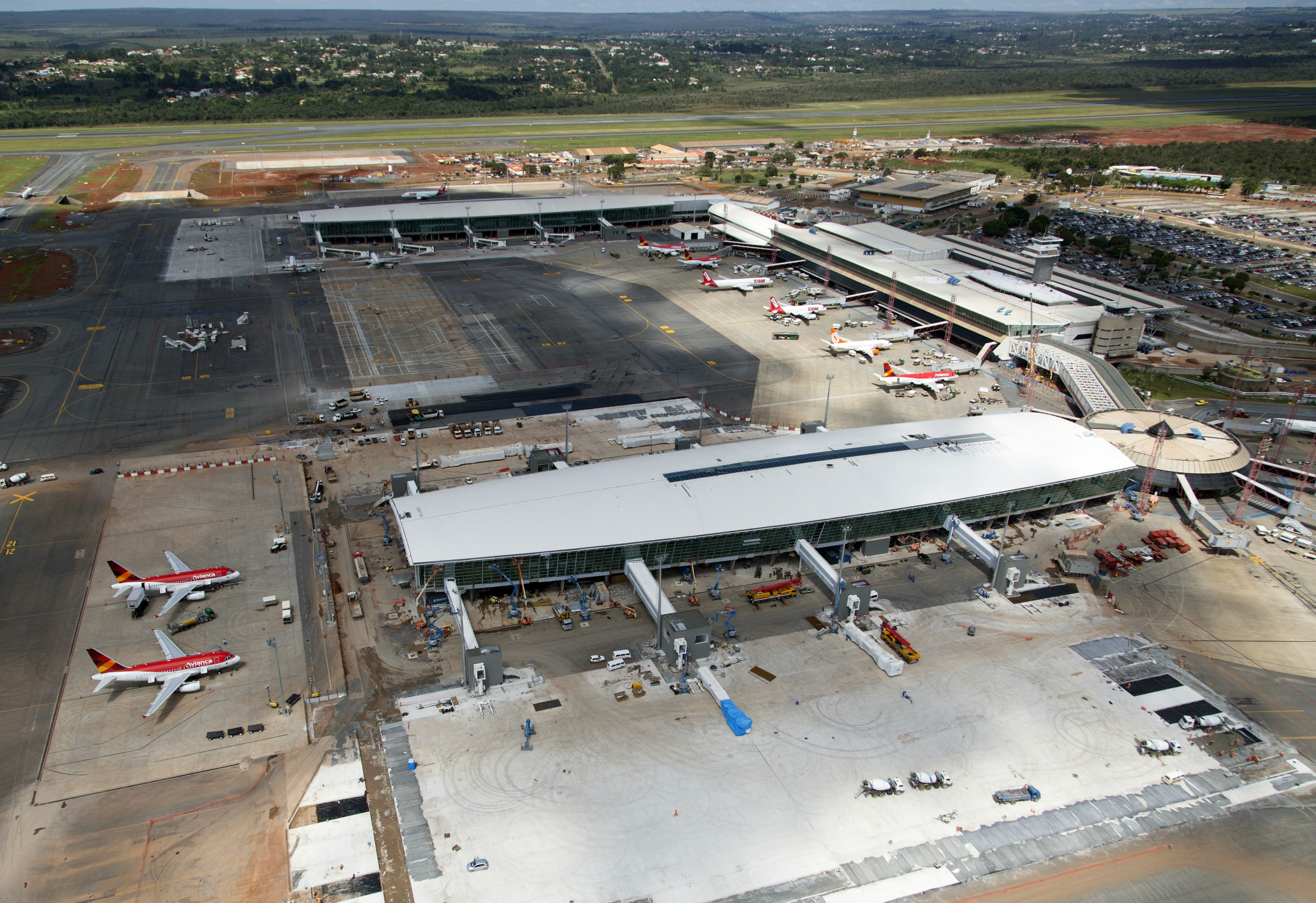
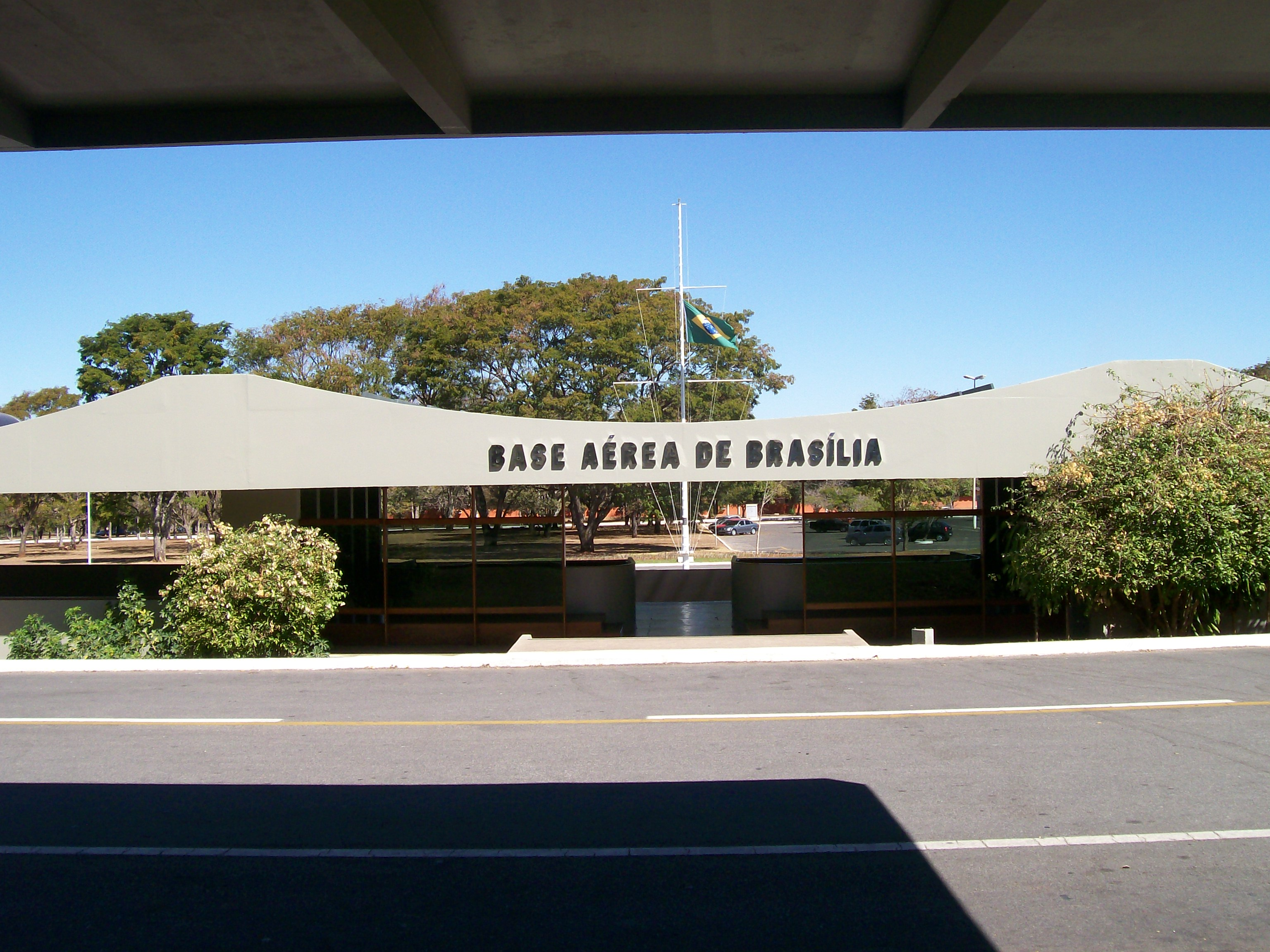
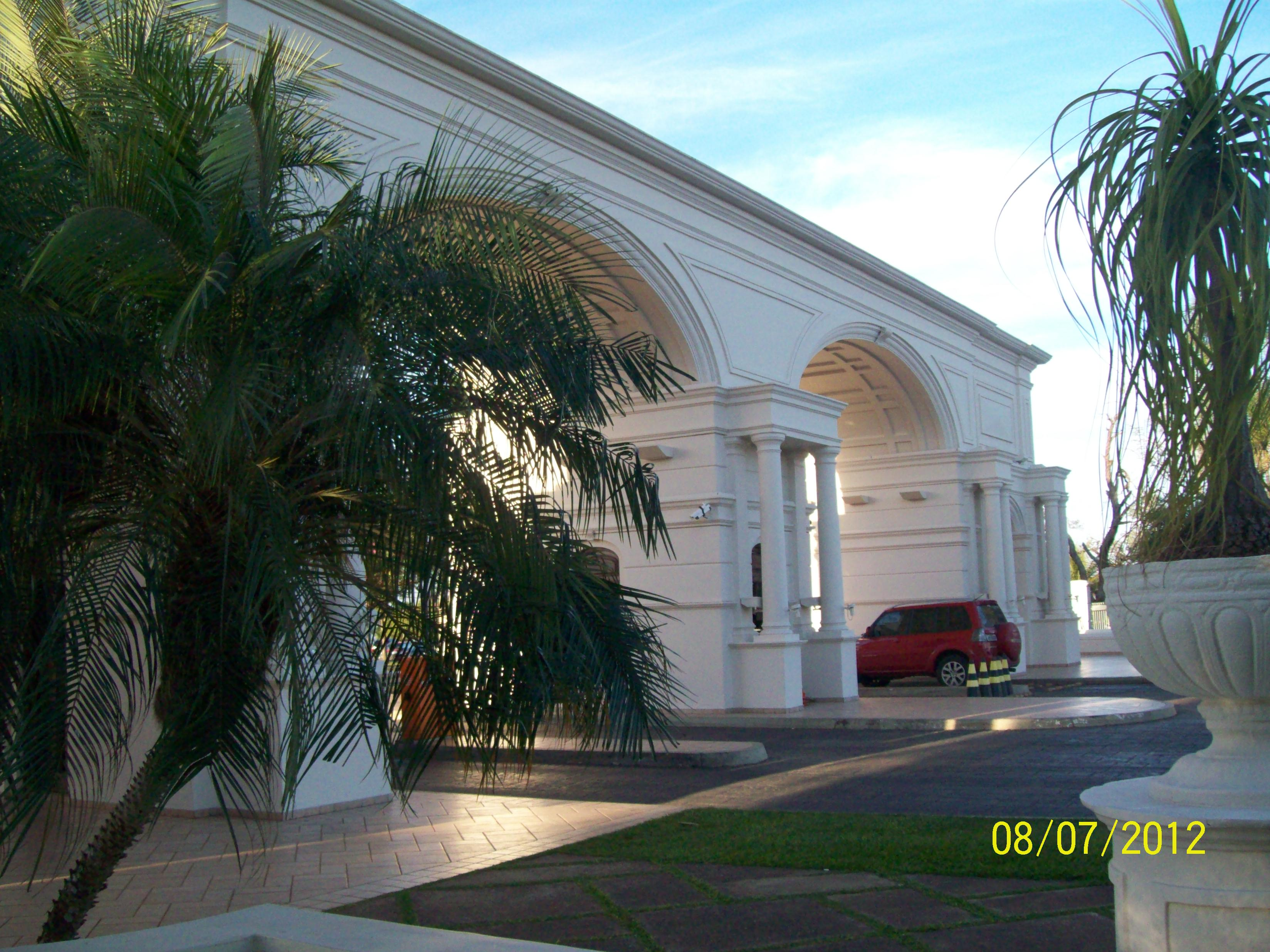
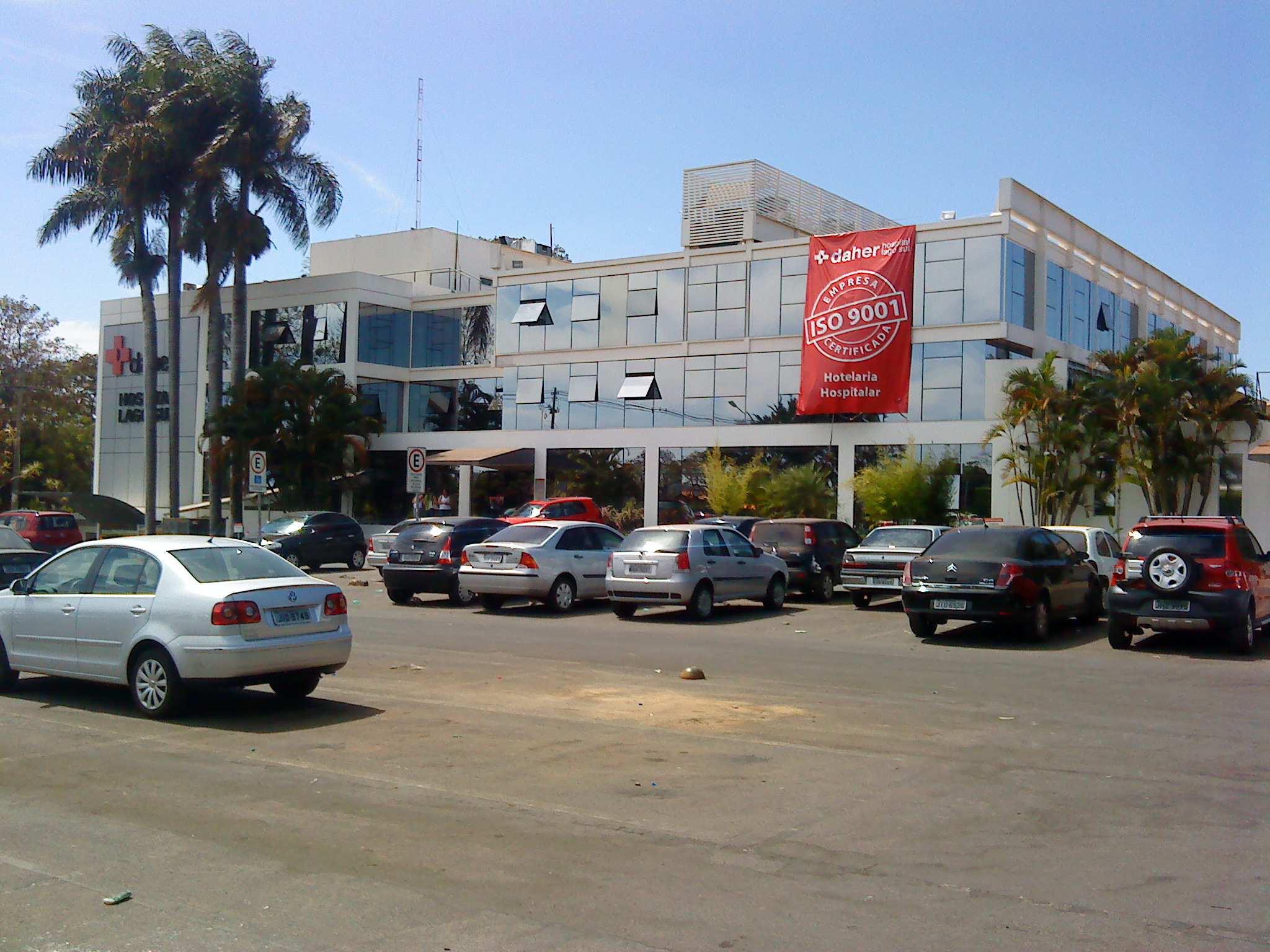
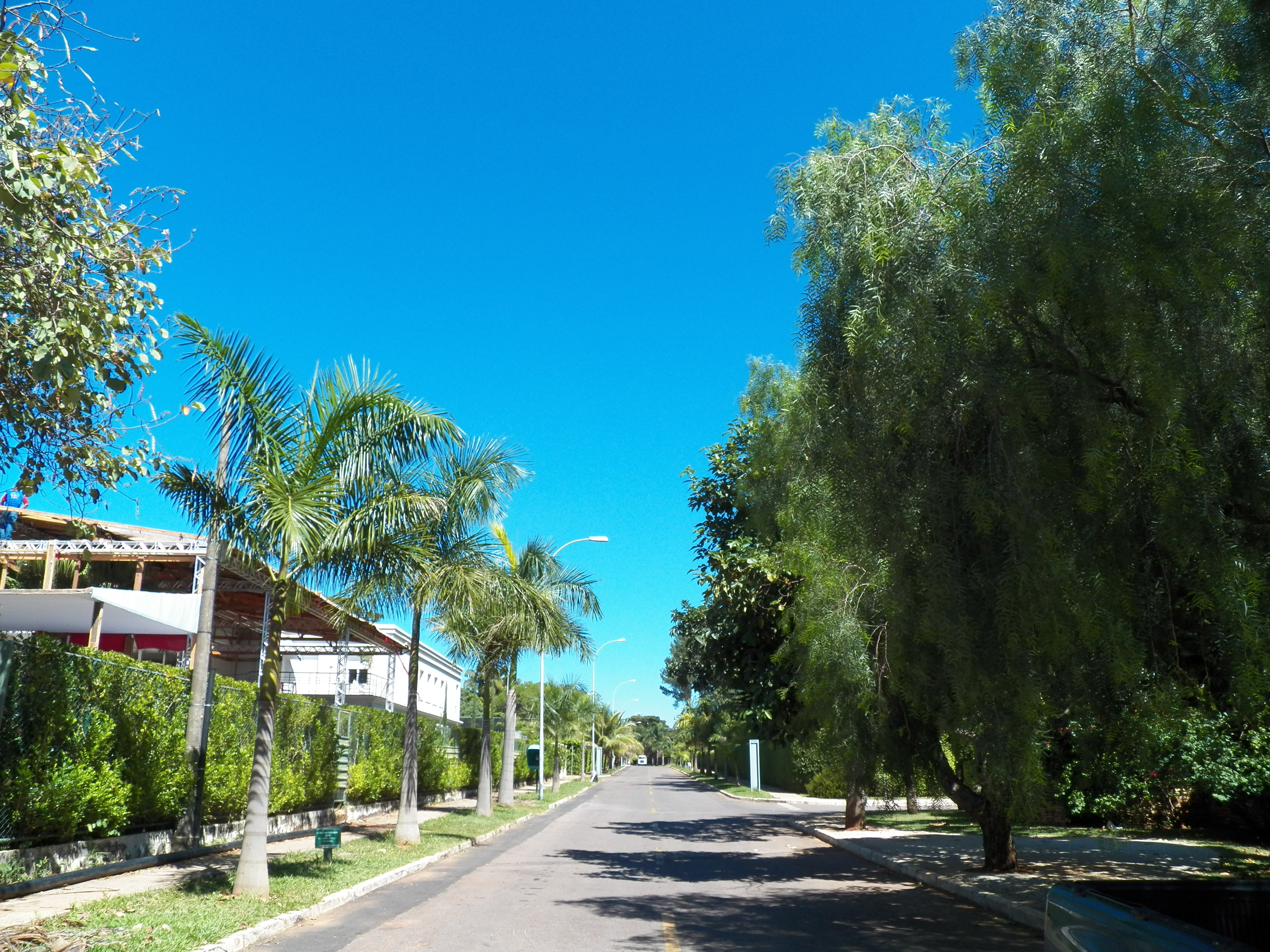
- Clockwise from top: Lake as seen from Lago Sul; Brasília Air Force Base; Daher Hospital; Ministers Peninsula; Pontão; Brasília International Airport

- Location of Lago Sul in the Federal District
- Coordinates: 15°50′34″S 47°52′40″W
- Country: Brazil
- Region: Central-West
- State: Federal District
- Established: 30 August 1960

Government
  - Regional administrator: Rubens Santoro Neto

Area
  - Total: 183.39 km^{2} (70.81 sq mi)

Population
  - Total: 30,175
  - Density: 164.54/km^{2} (426.16/sq mi)
- Time zone: UTC−3 (BRT)
- Area code: +55 61
- Website: www.lagosul.df.gov.br

Lago Sul (Portuguese pronunciation: [ˈla.ɡu ˈsuw]; lit. South Lake) is an administrative region in the Federal District in Brazil. It is located on the south side of the eastern shore of Lake Paranoá, opposite of Brasília and Lago Norte. The Presidente Juscelino Kubitschek International Airport is located in the southwesternmost edge of the region.

== Geography ==
Lago Sul is part of the Brazilian Highlands, with large amounts of cerrado vegetation.

=== Climate ===
Lago Sul has a tropical savanna climate (Aw in the Köppen Classification).

Climate data for Lago Sul (1991–2020, extremes 1961–present)
Month	Jan	Feb	Mar	Apr	May	Jun	Jul	Aug	Sep	Oct	Nov	Dec	Year
Record high °C (°F)	32.6 (90.7)	32.0 (89.6)	32.1 (89.8)	31.6 (88.9)	31.6 (88.9)	31.6 (88.9)	30.8 (87.4)	33.0 (91.4)	35.7 (96.3)	36.4 (97.5)	34.5 (94.1)	33.7 (92.7)	36.4 (97.5)
Mean daily maximum °C (°F)	26.9 (80.4)	27.2 (81.0)	27.0 (80.6)	26.8 (80.2)	26.0 (78.8)	25.3 (77.5)	25.6 (78.1)	27.4 (81.3)	29.1 (84.4)	29.0 (84.2)	27.0 (80.6)	26.8 (80.2)	27.0 (80.6)
Daily mean °C (°F)	21.9 (71.4)	21.9 (71.4)	21.8 (71.2)	21.6 (70.9)	20.3 (68.5)	19.3 (66.7)	19.3 (66.7)	21.0 (69.8)	22.8 (73.0)	23.1 (73.6)	21.7 (71.1)	21.7 (71.1)	21.4 (70.5)
Mean daily minimum °C (°F)	18.3 (64.9)	18.2 (64.8)	18.2 (64.8)	17.7 (63.9)	15.6 (60.1)	14.2 (57.6)	13.9 (57.0)	15.3 (59.5)	17.6 (63.7)	18.5 (65.3)	18.1 (64.6)	18.3 (64.9)	17.0 (62.6)
Record low °C (°F)	12.2 (54.0)	11.0 (51.8)	14.5 (58.1)	10.7 (51.3)	3.2 (37.8)	3.3 (37.9)	1.6 (34.9)	5.0 (41.0)	9.0 (48.2)	10.2 (50.4)	11.4 (52.5)	11.4 (52.5)	1.6 (34.9)
Average precipitation mm (inches)	206.0 (8.11)	179.5 (7.07)	226.0 (8.90)	145.2 (5.72)	26.9 (1.06)	3.3 (0.13)	1.5 (0.06)	16.3 (0.64)	38.1 (1.50)	141.8 (5.58)	253.1 (9.96)	241.1 (9.49)	1,478.8 (58.22)
Average precipitation days (≥ 1.0 mm)	16	14	15	9	3	1	0	2	4	10	17	18	109
Average relative humidity (%)	74.7	74.2	76.1	72.2	65.4	58.8	51.0	43.5	46.4	58.8	74.5	76.0	64.3
Mean monthly sunshine hours	159.6	158.9	168.7	200.8	237.9	247.6	268.3	273.5	225.7	191.3	138.3	145.0	2,415.6
Source 1: Instituto Nacional de Meteorologia
Source 2: Meteo Climat (record highs and lows)

== See also ==
- List of administrative regions of the Federal District
