= Campo de Provas Brigadeiro Velloso =

Combined military base in south Brazil

Brigadeiro Velloso Testing Range Portuguese: Campo de Provas Brigadeiro Velloso
- IATA: none; ICAO: SBCC

Summary
- Airport type: Military
- Operator: Brazilian Air Force
- Location: Novo Progresso, Pará, Brazil
- Built: 24 January 1954
- In use: 1954–present
- Time zone: BRT (UTC−03:00)
- Elevation AMSL: 1,762 ft / 537 m
- Coordinates: 9°20′0″S 54°57′53″W
- Website: fab.mil.br/cpbv

Map

Runways
Direction	Length		Surface
Direction	ft	m	Surface
12L/30R	8,527	2,599	Asphalt

Campo de Provas Brigadeiro Velloso – CPBV (English: Brigadeiro Velloso Testing Range) (ICAO: SBCC) is a large complex of the Brazilian Armed Forces located in Serra do Cachimbo (English: Smoking Pipe Mountains), in the southern part of Pará, Brazil. It is named after Haroldo Coimbra Velloso (1920–1969), an Air Force brigadier and politician who was responsible for the complex's creation.

It includes Cachimbo Airport.

== History ==
Campo de Provas Brigadeiro Velloso has an area of 21,588 km^{2} and perimeter of 653 km within the limits of four municipalities: Altamira, Itaituba, Jacareacanga, and Novo Progresso

The complex has its origins on an airfield opened on January 20, 1954 when the Brazilian Government saw the need for a support facility for aircraft flying between the Northern Region (such as to the Amazon rainforest) and the Southeast Region of Brazil (and to Rio de Janeiro and São Paulo). Before the construction of the airfield travel was only possible by following a much longer coastal route.

In the 1970s work was done in order to upgrade the facility to be a center of weapons testing for Brazilian Armed Forces with the purpose of the development of nuclear weapons. Rumored to have been carried out with technological aid from the Iraqi government, it was initially ordered by military dictator Ernesto Geisel and ran from 1975 to 1990. At its conclusion, the work was characterized by the New York Times as such, "Brazilian physicists have concluded that the military was one or two years away from having the materials - 20 to 35 pounds of weapons-grade enriched uranium - to make a Hiroshima-type bomb."

In 1990 it was decommissioned in a ceremony for media and scientific officials by the then President of Brazil Fernando Collor de Mello who symbolically threw a shovel full of concrete into an over 1,000-ft shaft of steel reinforced concrete which would have been the site of a nuclear detonation had the Brazilians been successful. A week later Fernando Collor de Mello had this to say to the United Nations General Assembly, "Brazil today rejects the idea of any test that implies nuclear explosions, even for peaceful ends''.

The facility now houses accommodations for 240 military personnel and a hospital for not only service members, but the local civilian populace too. In addition, the Brazilian Institute of Environment and Renewable Natural Resources maintains a research facility nearby

== Accidents and incidents ==
- 7 December 1960: a Real Transportes Aéreos Curtiss C-46A-60-CK Commando registration PP-AKF en route from Cuiabá to Manaus-Ponta Pelada crashed in Cachimbo mountains. The No.2 engine failed during the flight, and as altitude was lost the crew began to jettison cargo. But the aircraft continued its descent leading to a crash and subsequent fire, as well as the death of 15 passengers and crew.
- 29 September 2006: a damaged Embraer Legacy 600 performed a successful emergency landing on Cachimbo Airport, after a mid-air collision with a Gol Transportes Aéreos Boeing 737-800, flight 1907. The Boeing subsequently crashed in the jungle killing all 154 people on board.
