= Brava Linhas Aéreas =

Brazilian airline

Brava Linhas Aéreas Ltda.
IATA	ICAO	Call sign
N7	NHG	HELGA
- Founded: 2006
- Ceased operations: 2013
- Operating bases: Porto Alegre
- Fleet size: 3
- Destinations: 9
- Headquarters: Porto Alegre, Brazil
- Key people: Jorge Barouki (Director-President)
- Website: www.voebrava.com.br

Brava Linhas Aéreas Ltda, formerly known as NHT Linhas Aéreas, was a domestic airline based in Porto Alegre, Brazil founded in 2006. The airline has been grounded since late 2013 after the National Civil Aviation Agency of Brazil (ANAC) suspended the company's Transportation Operating Certificate. Jorge Barouki, president of the company, has stated that Brava requested the suspension since the airline no longer had the capital to pay its employees.

According to the National Civil Aviation Agency of Brazil (ANAC) between January and December 2012 Brava (then still operating as NHT) had 0.02% of the domestic market share in terms of passengers-kilometre flown.

== History ==
Originally named NHT Linhas Aéreas, the airline started operations in August 2006 serving cities in Rio Grande do Sul. After expanding services in the states of Paraná, Rio Grande do Sul, and Santa Catarina, on April 9, 2010, NHT was granted much sought-for slots at São Paulo-Congonhas Airport, enabling the airline to start services to the state of São Paulo.

Previously controlled by JMT Holding, which belongs to the family Teixeira, on May 18, 2012, NHT was sold to Group Acauã, belonging to the entrepreneur Jorge Barouki. Whereas JMT will dedicate itself to road transportation, Acauã plans to increase the fleet and open new routes, particularly in the state of Santa Catarina.

As of March 2013 the airline ceased to use its original name NHT Linhas Aéreas and, as part of rebranding strategy, started to use the new name Brava Linhas Aéreas. Plans exist to start using four Embraer EMB 120 Brasília.

By the end of 2013, the airline had been grounded by the National Civil Aviation Agency of Brazil (ANAC) and ceased all flights.

As of July 2019, the airline was reported as being out of business.

== Destinations ==
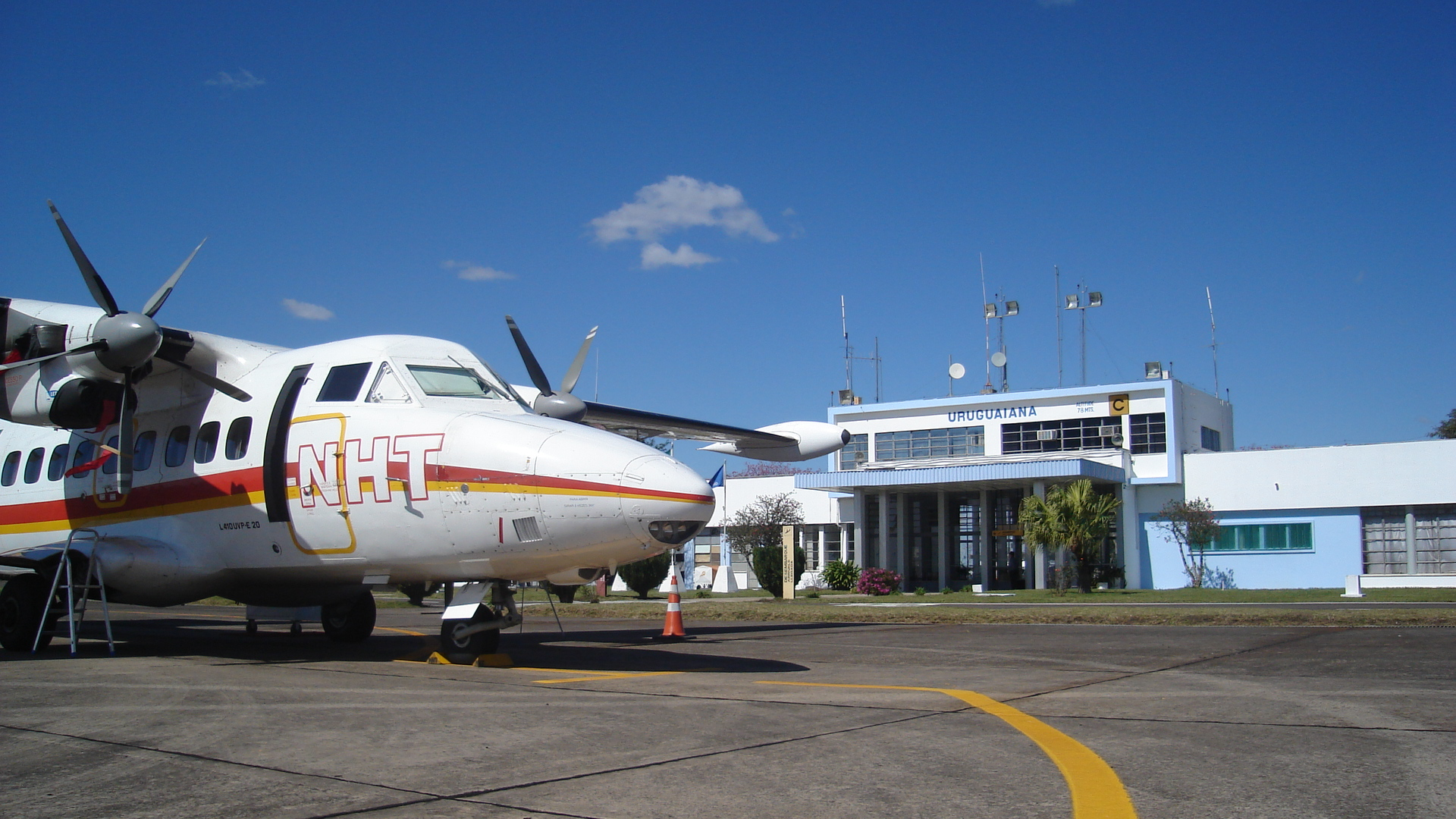
A company LET-410 at Uruguaiana

Logo of the airline when it was called NHT

NHT/Brava Linhas Aéreas operated services to the following destinations:

City	Airport	Notes
Caçador	Carlos Alberto da Costa Neves Airport	
Campinas	Viracopos International Airport	
Chapecó	Serafin Enoss Bertaso Airport	
Concórdia	Olavo Cecco Rigon Airport	
Curitiba	Afonso Pena International Airport	
Erechim	Erechim Airport	
Florianópolis	Hercílio Luz International Airport	
Francisco Beltrão	Paulo Abdala Airport	
Joaçaba	Santa Terezinha Airport	
Lages	Antônio Correia Pinto de Macedo Airport	
Navegantes	Ministro Victor Konder International Airport	
Passo Fundo	Lauro Kurtz Airport	
Pelotas	Pelotas International Airport	
Porto Alegre	Salgado Filho International Airport	
Rio Grande	Rio Grande Airport	
Santa Maria	Santa Maria Airport	
Santa Rosa	Luís Alberto Lehr Airport	
Santo Ângelo	Sepé Tiaraju Airport	
São Carlos	Mário Pereira Lopes Airport	
São Miguel do Oeste	Hélio Wasum Airport	
São Paulo	Congonhas Airport	
Uruguaiana	Ruben Berta International Airport	

== Fleet ==
As of February 2014 the fleet of Brava Linhas Aéreas included the following aircraft:

NHT/Brava Linhas Aéreas fleet
Aircraft	Total	Orders	Passengers (Y)	Introduced	Notes
Let L-410 UVP E-20	2	–	19	2006	–
Embraer EMB 120RT Brasília	1	3	30	2013	–

== Affinity Program ==
Brava Linhas Aéreas has no Frequent Flyer Program.

== See also ==
- List of defunct airlines of Brazil
