= List of airports in Brazil =

Map of Brazil

This is a list of airports in Brazil.

On October 24, 2025, the National Civil Aviation Agency of Brazil listed 498 public and 3,688 private certified aerodromes, and 199 helidecks and 1,526 helipads in Brazil.

== Airports ==
Airport names shown in bold indicate that the airport is served by scheduled services.

City served	State	ICAO	IATA	LID	Airport name	Administrator
Água Boa	MT	SWHP	GGB	MT0006	**Frederico Carlos Müller Airport**	
Alegrete	RS	SSLT	ALQ	RS0022	Gaudêncio Machado Ramos Airport	
Alenquer	PA	SDWQ	ALT	PA0027	Alenquer Airport	
Almeirim	PA	SNYA	GGF	PA0024	**Almeirim Airport**	
Alta Floresta	MT	SBAT	AFL	MT0003	**Piloto Oswaldo Marques Dias Airport**	Aeroeste
Altamira	PA	SBHT	ATM	PA0003	**Altamira Airport**	AENA
Anápolis	GO	SWNS	APS	GO0004	Anápolis Airport	Infraero
Andradina	SP	SDDN		SP0020	Paulino Ribeiro de Andrade State Airport	ASP
Angra dos Reis	RJ	SDAG	GDR	RJ0010	Carmelo Jordão Airport	Angra Aeroportos
Apucarana	PR	SSAP	APU	PR0014	Capitão João Busse Airport	SEIL
Apuí	AM	SWYN	IUP	AM0023	**Apuí Airport**	
Aracaju	SE	SBAR	AJU	SE0001	**Santa Maria International Airport**	AENA
Aracati	CE	SBAC	ARX	CE0004	**Canoa Quebrada Dragão do Mar Regional Airport**	GRU Airport
Araçatuba	SP	SBAU	ARU	SP0009	**Dario Guarita State Airport**	ASP
Araguaína	TO	SWGN	AUX	TO0002	**Araguaína Regional Airport**	GRU Airport
Arapongas	PR	SSOG	APX	PR0027	Alberto Bertelli Airport	SEIL
Arapoti	PR	SSYA	AAG	X	Avelino Vieira Airport	Closed
Araraquara	SP	SBAQ	AQA	SP0012	**Bartholomeu de Gusmão State Airport**	Rede Voa
Araripina	PE	SNAB	JAW	PE0009	**Comte. Mairson C. Bezerra Airport**	GRU Airport
Araxá	MG	SBAX	AAX	MG0008	**Romeu Zema Airport**	
Aripuanã	MT	SSOU	AIR	MT0303	**Aripuanã Airport**	Private
Ariquemes	RO	SJOG	AQM	RO0008	Ariquemes Airport	Infraero
Armação dos Búzios	RJ	SSBZ	BZC	RJ0012	Umberto Modiano Airport	Dix
Arraias	TO	SWRA	AAI	X	Dep. Joaquim Coelho Airport	Closed
Assis	SP	SNAX	AIF	SP0016	Marcelo Pires Halzhausen State Airport	ASP
Avaré / Arandu	SP	SDRR	QVP	SP0028	Comte. Luiz Gonzaga Lutti Regional Airport	Rede Voa
Bagé	RS	SBBG	BGX	RS0010	Comte. Gustavo Kraemer International Airport	ASUR
Barcelos	AM	SWBC	BAZ	AM0017	**Barcelos Airport**	
Barra	BA	SNBX	BQQ	BA0028	Barra Airport	
Barra do Garças	MT	SBBW	BPG	MT0008	**Barra do Garças Airport**	
Barra Grande (Maraú)	BA	SIRI	MUU	BA0096	Barra Grande Airport	Private
Barreiras	BA	SNBR	BRA	BA0011	**Dom Ricardo Weberberger Airport**	
Barreirinha	AM	SJ9A		AM0111	Barreirinha Airport	Private
Barreirinhas	MA	SSRS	BRB	MA0008	Barreirinhas Lençóis Maranhenses Regional Airport	GRU Airport
Barretos	SP	SNBA	BAT	SP0013	**Chafei Amsei State Airport**	ASP
Bauru	SP	SBBU	BAU	SP0017	Comte. João Ribeiro de Barros Airport	Municipality
Bauru / Arealva	SP	SBAE	JTC	SP0010	**Moussa Nakhl Tobias State Airport**	Rede Voa
Belém	PA	SBBE	BEL	PA0001	**Val-de-Cans/Júlio Cezar Ribeiro International Airport**	Novo Norte
Belo Horizonte	MG	SBBH	PLU	MG0003	Pampulha-Carlos Drummond de Andrade Airport	ASUR
Belo Horizonte / Confins	MG	SBCF	CNF	MG0001	**Tancredo Neves International Airport**	BH Airport
Belo Jardim	PE	SNBJ		X	Olegário Franklin Cordeiro Airport	Closed
Blumenau	SC	SSBL	BNU	SC0019	**Quero-quero Airport**	
Boa Vista	RR	SBBV	BVB	RR0001	**Atlas Brasil Cantanhede International Airport**	Vinci SA
Boipeba (Cairu)	BA	SDLO	PBA	BA0074	Fábio Perini Airport	Private
Bom Jesus da Lapa	BA	SBLP	LAZ	BA0037	Bom Jesus da Lapa Airport	
Bonito	MS	SBDB	BYO	MS0004	**Bonito Airport**	
Borba	AM	SWBR	RBB	AM0018	Borba Airport	
Botucatu	SP	SDBK	QCP	SP0019	Tancredo de Almeida Neves Airport	Municipality
Bragança Paulista	SP	SBBP	BJP	SP0036	Arthur Siqueira State Airport	Rede Voa
Brasília – São Sebastião	DF	SIQE		DF0005	Planalto Central Aerodrome	Infracea
Brasília – Lago Sul	DF	SBBR	BSB	DF0001	**Pres. Juscelino Kubitschek International Airport**	Inframérica
Breves	PA	SNVS	BVS	PA0015	**Breves Airport**	
Cabo Frio	RJ	SBCB	CFB	RJ0003	**Cabo Frio International Airport**	Aeropart
Caçador	SC	SBCD	CFC	SC0006	**Dr. Carlos Alberto da Costa Neves Airport**	
Cachoeiro de Itapemirim	ES	SNKI	CDI	ES0006	Raimundo de Andrade Airport	
Cacoal	RO	SSKW	OAL	RO0004	**Capital do Café Airport**	GRU Airport
Cajazeiras	PB	SJZA	CJZ	PB0004	**Pedro Viera Moreira Airport**	
Caldas Novas / Rio Quente	GO	SBCN	CLV	GO0003	**Nelson Ribeiro Guimarães Airport**	Socicam
Camocim	CE	SNWC	CMC	CE0011	Camocim Airport	Visac
Campina Grande	PB	SBKG	CPV	PB0003	**Pres. João Suassuna Airport**	AENA
Campinas	SP	SDAM	CPQ	SP0037	Campo dos Amarais-Pref. Francisco Amaral State Airport	Rede Voa
Campinas	SP	SBKP	VCP	SP0003	**Viracopos International Airport**	Aeroportos Brasil
Campo Grande	MS	SBCG	CGR	MS0001	**Ueze Elias Zahran International Airport**	AENA
Campo Mourão	PR	SSKM	CBW	PR0017	Cel. Geraldo Guias de Aquino Airport	SEIL
Campos dos Goytacazes	RJ	SBCP	CAW	RJ0006	Bartolomeu Lysandro Airport	Infra
Campos Sales	CE	SNCS		CE0009	Campos Sales Regional Airport	Visac
Canarana	MT	SWEK	CQA	MT0024	Canarana Airport	
Canela / Gramado	RS	SSCN	CEL	RS0019	Canela Airport	Infraero
Carajás (Parauapebas)	PA	SBCJ	CKS	PA0006	**Carajás Airport**	AENA
Caratinga / Ubaporanga	MG	SNCT		MG0056	Ubaporanga Airport	
Carauari	AM	SWCA	CAF	AM0007	Carauari Airport	
Caravelas	BA	SBCV	CRQ	X	Caravelas Airport	Closed
Carolina	MA	SBCI	CLN	MA0003	Brig. Lysias Augusto Rodrigues Airport	
Caruaru	PE	SNRU	CAU	PE0004	**Oscar Laranjeira Airport**	Dix
Cascavel	PR	SBCA	CAC	PR0005	**Regional West Airport**	Municipality
Caxias do Sul	RS	SBCX	CXJ	RS0007	**Hugo Cantergiani Regional Airport**	Infraero
Chapecó	SC	SBCH	XAP	SC0003	**Serafin Enoss Bertaso Airport**	Voe XAP
Cianorte	PR	SSCT	GGH	PR0025	Eng. Gastão de Mesquita Filho Airport	SEIL
Coari	AM	SWKO	CIZ	AM0010	Coari Airport	
Conceição do Araguaia	PA	SBAA	CDJ	PA0008	Conceição do Araguaia Airport	
Concórdia	SC	SSCK	CCI	SC0010	Olavo Cecco Rigon Airport	
Confresa	MT	SJHG	CFO	MT0176	Confresa Airport	Private
Cornélio Procópio	PR	SSCP	CKO	PR0015	Francisco Lacerda Junior Airport	SEIL
Correia Pinto / Lages	SC	SNCP	EEA	SC0181	**Planalto Serrano Regional Airport**	Infracea
Corumbá	MS	SBCR	CMG	MS0009	**Corumbá International Airport**	AENA
Crateús	CE	SNWS	JCS	CE0005	Dr. Lúcio Lima Regional Airport	Visac
Criciúma / Forquilhinha	SC	SSIM	CCM	SC0009	**Diomício Freitas Airport**	Infracea
Cruzeiro do Sul	AC	SBCZ	CZS	AC0002	**Cruzeiro do Sul International Airport**	Vinci SA
Cuiabá / Várzea Grande	MT	SBCY	CGB	MT0001	**Mal. Rondon International Airport**	Aeroeste
Curitiba	PR	SBBI	BFH	PR0006	Bacacheri Airport	ASUR
Curitiba / São José dos Pinhais	PR	SBCT	CWB	PR0001	**Afonso Pena International Airport**	ASUR
Diamantina	MG	SNDT	DTI	MG0030	**Juscelino Kubitschek Airport**	
Divinópolis	MG	SNDV	DIQ	MG0015	**Brig. Cabral Airport**	Infraero
Dourados	MS	SBDO	DOU	MS0008	Francisco de Matos Pereira Airport	Infraero
Dracena	SP	SDDR	QDC	SP0021	Muliterno de Dracena State Airport	ASP
Eirunepé	AM	SWEI	ERN	AM0009	Amaury Feitosa Tomaz Airport	
Erechim	RS	SSER	ERM	RS0018	Erechim Airport	DAP
Feijó	AC	SNOU	FEJ	AC0003	Feijó Airport	Deracre
Feira de Santana	BA	SDIY	FEC	BA0013	Gov. João Durval Carneiro Airport	FSA
Fernando de Noronha	PE	SBFN	FEN	PE0003	**Gov. Carlos Wilson Airport**	Dix
Florianópolis	SC	SBFL	FLN	SC0001	**Hercílio Luz International Airport**	Zurich Airport Brasil
Fonte Boa	AM	SWOB	FBA	AM0014	Fonte Boa Airport	
Fortaleza	CE	SBFZ	FOR	CE0001	**Pinto Martins International Airport**	Fraport Brasil
Foz do Iguaçu	PR	SBFI	IGU	PR0002	**Cataratas International Airport**	ASUR
Franca	SP	SIMK	FRC	SP0011	**Ten. Lund Presotto State Airport**	Rede Voa
Francisco Beltrão	PR	SSFB	FBE	PR0021	Paulo Abdala Airport	SEIL
Garanhuns	PE	SNGN	QGP	PE0006	**Garanhuns Airport**	GRU Airport
Gavião Peixoto	SP	SBGP		SP0075	Gavião Peixoto Embraer Section	Embraer
Goiânia	GO	SBNV		GO0002	Aeródromo Nacional de Aviação	
Goiânia	GO	SBGO	GYN	GO0001	**Santa Genoveva International Airport**	ASUR
Governador Valadares	MG	SBGV	GVR	MG0032	**Cel. Altino Machado de Oliveira Airport**	Infraero
Guaíra	PR	SSGY	GGJ	PR0023	**Walter Martins de Oliveira Airport**	SEIL
Guanambi	BA	SNGI	GNM	BA0009	**Isaac Moura Rocha Airport**	Infracea
Guarapari	ES	SNGA	GUZ	ES0007	Guarapari Airport	
Guarapuava	PR	SSGG	GPB	PR0009	Tancredo Thomas de Faria Airport	SEIL
Guaratinguetá	SP	SBGW	GUJ	SP0076	Edu Chaves Airport	Rede Voa
Gurupi	TO	SWGI	GRP	TO0004	Comte. Jacinto Nunes Airport	Infraero
Humaitá	AM	SWHT	HUW	AM0019	Francisco Correa da Cruz Airport	
Iguatu	CE	SNIG	QIG	CE0007	Dr. Francisco Tomé da Frota Airport	Visac
Ijuí	RS	SSIJ	IJU	RS0032	João Batista Bos Filho Airport	DAP
Ilhéus	BA	SBIL	IOS	BA0004	**Jorge Amado Airport**	Socicam
Imperatriz	MA	SBIZ	IMP	MA0002	**Pref. Renato Moreira Airport**	ASUR
Ipatinga / Santana do Paraíso	MG	SBIP	IPN	MG0007	**Vale do Aço Regional Airport**	Infraero
Itacoatiara	AM	SBIC		AM0012	Mariano Arico Barros Airport	
Itaituba	PA	SBIH	ITB	PA0010	**Itaituba Airport**	
Itanhaém	SP	SDIM	JTN	SP0033	Antônio Ribeiro Nogueira Jr. State Airport	Rede Voa
Itaperuna	RJ	SDUN	ITP	RJ0008	Ernani do Amaral Peixoto Airport	Infraero
Itumbiara	GO	SBIT	ITR	GO0035	Francisco Vilela do Amaral Airport	Private
Jaguaruna	SC	SBJA	JJG	SC0005	**Humberto Ghizzo Bortoluzzi Southern Regional Airport**	RDL Aeroportos
Januária	MG	SNJN	JNA	X	Januária Airport	Closed
Jijoca de Jericoacoara / Cruz	CE	SBJE	JJD	CE0003	**Comte. Ariston Pessoa Regional Airport**	Fraport Brasil
Ji-Paraná	RO	SBJI	JPR	RO0005	**José Coleto Airport**	
Joaçaba	SC	SSJA	JCB	SC0014	**Santa Terezinha Airport**	
João Pessoa / Santa Rita	PB	SBJP	JPA	PB0001	**Pres. Castro Pinto International Airport**	AENA
Joinville	SC	SBJV	JOI	SC0004	**Lauro Carneiro de Loyola Airport**	ASUR
Juara	MT	SIZX	JUA	MT0018	Mauro Luiz Frizon Airport	
Juazeiro do Norte	CE	SBJU	JDO	CE0002	**Orlando Bezerra de Menezes Airport**	AENA
Juína	MT	SWJN	JIA	MT0007	**Juína Airport**	
Juiz de Fora	MG	SBJF	JDF	MG0016	Francisco Álvares de Assis Airport	Infraero
Juiz de Fora / Goianá	MG	SBZM	IZA	MG0006	**Pres. Itamar Franco Airport (Zona da Mata)**	Socicam
Jundiaí	SP	SBJD	QDV	SP0031	Comte. Rodolfo Rolim Amaro State Airport	Rede Voa
Juruena	MT	SWJU	JRN	X	Juruena Airport	Closed
Juruti	PA	SNRJ	JRT	PA0103	Juruti Airport	
Lábrea	AM	SWLB	LBR	AM0024	**Lábrea Airport**	
Lages	SC	SBLJ	LAJ	SC0007	**Antônio Correia Pinto de Macedo Airport**	Infracea
Lençóis	BA	SBLE	LEC	BA0006	**Cel. Horácio de Mattos Airport**	GRU Airport
Linhares	ES	SNLN	LHN	ES0002	**Antônio Edson de Azevedo Lima Airport**	Infraero
Lins	SP	SWXQ	LIP	SP0015	Gov. Lucas Nogueira Garcez Airport	Municipality
Londrina	PR	SBLO	LDB	PR0003	**Gov. José Richa Airport**	ASUR
Luziânia	GO	SWUZ		GO0025	Brig. Araripe Macedo Airport	Infraero
Lucas do Rio Verde	MT	SILC	LVR	MT0025	Bom Futuro Airport	Municipality
Macaé	RJ	SBME	MEA	RJ0004	Joaquim de Azevedo Mancebo Airport	Zurich Airport Brasil
Macapá	AP	SBMQ	MCP	AP0001	**Alberto Alcolumbre International Airport**	Novo Norte
Maceió	AL	SBMO	MCZ	AL0001	**Zumbi dos Palmares International Airport**	AENA
Manaus	AM	SBEG	MAO	AM0001	**Eduardo Gomes International Airport**	Vinci SA
Manaus	AM	SWFN		AM0002	Flores Airport	Infraero
Manhuaçu	MG	SNJM	JMA	MG0050	**Elias Breder Airport**	
Manicoré	AM	SBMY	MNX	AM0015	**Manicoré Airport**	
Marabá	PA	SBMA	MAB	PA0004	**João Correa da Rocha Airport**	AENA
Maricá	RJ	SBMI	JMR	RJ0009	Laélio Baptista Airport	Municipality
Marília	SP	SBML	MII	SP0014	**Frank Miloye Milenkovich State Airport**	Rede Voa
Maringá	PR	SBMG	MGF	PR0004	**Sílvio Name Júnior Regional Airport**	SEIL
Matupá	MT	SWXM	MBK	MT0014	Orlando Villas-Bôas Regional Airport	
Maués	AM	SWMW	MBZ	AM0020	**Maués Airport**	
Minaçu	GO	SWIQ	MQH	GO0019	José Caires de Oliveira Airport	Municipality
Monte Alegre	PA	SNMA	MTE	PA0019	Monte Alegre Airport	
Monte Dourado (Almeirim)	PA	SBMD	MEU	PA0009	**Serra do Areão Airport**	
Montes Claros	MG	SBMK	MOC	MG0004	**Mário Ribeiro Airport**	AENA
Morro de São Paulo (Cairu)	BA	SNCL	MXQ	BA0131	**Lorenzo Airport**	Private
Mossoró	RN	SBMS	MVF	RN0002	**Gov. Dix-Sept Rosado Airport**	Infraero
Mucugê	BA	SNQU	CHD	BA0032	Mucugê Airport	
Mucuri	BA	SNMU	MVS	BA0142	Max Feffer Airport	Private
Natal / São Gonçalo do Amarante	RN	SBSG	NAT	RN0001	**Gov. Aluízio Alves International Airport**	Zurich Airport Brasil
Navegantes	SC	SBNF	NVT	SC0002	**Min. Victor Konder International Airport**	ASUR
Nova Mutum	MT	SDNM	NVM	MT0047	Brig. Eduardo Gomes Airport	
Novo Progresso	PA	SJNP	NPR	PA0026	Novo Progresso Airport	
Óbidos	PA	SNTI	OBI	PA0016	Óbidos Airport	
Oeiras	PI	SNOE		PI0008	Oeiras Airport	Esaero
Oiapoque	AP	SBOI	OYK	AP0002	Oiapoque Airport	
Oriximiná	PA	SNOX	ORX	PA0014	Oriximiná Airport	
Ourilândia do Norte	PA	SDOW	OIA	PA0021	**Ourilândia do Norte Airport**	
Ourinhos	SP	SDOU	OUS	SP0023	Jornalista Benedito Pimentel Airport	Municipality
Palmas	TO	SBPJ	PMW	TO0001	**Brig. Lysias Rodrigues International Airport**	ASUR
Paracatu	MG	SNZR	PYT	MG0026	**Pedro Rabelo de Souza Airport**	Infracea
Paragominas	PA	SNEB	JPE	PA0018	**Nagib Demachki Airport**	
Paranaguá	PR	SSPG	PNG	PR0011	Santos Dumont Airport	SEIL
Paranavaí	PR	SSPI	PVI	PR0010	Edu Chaves Airport	Infraero
Paraty	RJ	SDTK	JPY	RJ0011	Paraty Airport	
Parintins	AM	SWPI	PIN	AM0006	**Júlio Belém Airport**	
Parnaíba	PI	SBPB	PHB	PI0002	Pref. Dr. João Silva Filho International Airport	SBPB
Passo Fundo	RS	SBPF	PFB	RS0006	**Lauro Kurtz Airport**	ON8
Pato Branco	PR	SBPO	PTO	PR0018	**Prof. Juvenal Loureiro Cardoso Airport**	SEIL
Patos	PB	SNTS	JPO	PB0005	**Brig. Firmino Ayres Airport**	
Patos de Minas	MG	SNPD	POJ	MG0010	**Pedro Pereira dos Santos Airport**	
Paulo Afonso	BA	SBUF	PAV	BA0007	Paulo Afonso Airport	GRU Airport
Pelotas	RS	SBPK	PET	RS0005	**João Simões Lopes Neto International Airport**	ASUR
Penápolis	SP	SDPN		SP0024	Dr. Ramalho Franco State Airport	ASP
Petrolina	PE	SBPL	PNZ	PE0002	**Sen. Nilo Coelho International Airport**	ASUR
Picos	PI	SNPC	PCS	PI0009	Sen. Helvídio Nunes Regional Airport	Esaero
Pimenta Bueno	RO	SWPM	PBQ	RO0009	**Euflávio Odilon Ribeiro Airport**	
Piracicaba	SP	SDPW	QHB	SP0041	Pedro Morganti Airport	Municipality
Poços de Caldas	MG	SBPC	POO	MG0018	Emb. Walther Moreira Salles Airport	Infraero
Ponta Grossa	PR	SBPG	PGZ	PR0012	Comte. Antonio Amilton Beraldo Airport	SEIL
Ponta Porã	MS	SBPP	PMG	MS0005	**Ponta Porã International Airport**	AENA
Pontes e Lacerda	MT	SWBG	LCB	MT0009	André Antônio Maggi Airport	
Porecatu	PR	SSPK		X	Porecatu Airport	Closed
Porto Alegre	RS	SBPA	POA	RS0001	**Salgado Filho International Airport**	Fraport Brasil
Porto Alegre do Norte	MT	SDH2		MT0662	Porto Alegre do Norte Airport	GRU Airport
Porto de Moz	PA	SNMZ	PTQ	PA0020	**Porto de Moz Airport**	
Porto Nacional	TO	SDPE	PNB	TO0003	Porto Nacional Airport	
Porto Seguro	BA	SBPS	BPS	BA0002	**Porto Seguro International Airport**	Sinart
Porto de Trombetas (Oriximiná)	PA	SBTB	TMT	PA0012	**Porto Trombetas Airport**	MRN S/A
Porto Urucu (Coari)	AM	SBUY	RPU	AM0025	Porto Urucu Airport	Petrobras
Porto Velho	RO	SBPV	PVH	RO0001	**Gov. Jorge Teixeira de Oliveira International Airport**	Vinci SA
Presidente Epitácio	SP	SDEP		SP0052	Geraldo Moacir Bordon State Airport	ASP
Presidente Prudente	SP	SBDN	PPB	SP0005	**Adhemar de Barros State Airport**	ASP
Primavera do Leste	MT	SWPY		MT0023	Primavera do Leste Airport	
Quixadá	CE	SNQX	QXD	CE0010	Quixadá Regional Airport	Visac
Recife	PE	SBRF	REC	PE0001	**Guararapes–Gilberto Freyre International Airport**	AENA
Redenção	PA	SNDC	RDC	PA0030	Redenção Airport	
Registro	SP	SSRG		SP0030	Alberto Bertelli State Airport	Rede Voa
Resende	RJ	SDRS	REZ	RJ0007	Resende Airport	Municipality
Ribeirão Preto	SP	SBRP	RAO	SP0004	**Dr. Leite Lopes State Airport**	Rede Voa
Rio Branco	AC	SBRB	RBR	AC0001	**Plácido de Castro International Airport**	Vinci SA
Rio de Janeiro	RJ	SBGL	GIG	RJ0001	**Galeão–Antonio Carlos Jobim International Airport**	RIOgaleão, AENA
Rio de Janeiro	RJ	SBJR	RRJ	RJ0005	**Jacarepaguá–Roberto Marinho Airport**	Pax Aeroportos
Rio de Janeiro	RJ	SBRJ	SDU	RJ0002	**Santos Dumont Airport**	Infraero
Rio Grande	RS	SJRG	RIG	RS0013	Rio Grande Regional Airport	DAP
Rio Verde	GO	SWLC	RVD	GO0009	Gal. Leite de Castro Airport	
Rondonópolis	MT	SBRD	ROO	MT0004	**Maestro Marinho Franco Airport**	Aeroeste
Salinas	MG	SNSS	IAL	MG0029	Salinas Airport	
Salinópolis	PA	SNSM	OPP	PA0250	**Salinópolis Airport**	Infraero
Salvador da Bahia	BA	SBSV	SSA	BA0001	**Dep. Luís Eduardo Magalhães International Airport**	Vinci SA
Santa Cruz do Sul	RS	SSSC	CSU	RS0029	Luiz Beck da Silva Airport	
Santa Isabel do Rio Negro	AM	SWTP	IRZ	AM0022	Tapuruquara Airport	Municipality
Santa Maria	RS	SBSM	RIA	RS0003	**Santa Maria Airport**	Municipality
Santa Rosa	RS	SSZR	SRA	RS0027	Luís Alberto Lehr Airport	DAP
Santa Terezinha	MT	SWST	STZ	X	Santa Terezinha Airport	Closed
Santana do Araguaia	PA	SD12	CMP	PA0017	Santana do Araguaia Airport	Private
Santana do Livramento / Rivera	RS / RV	SURV	RVY	AD2.13	Pres. Gral. Óscar D. Gestido Binational Airport^{a}	Aeropuertos Uruguay
Santarém	PA	SBSN	STM	PA0002	**Maestro Wilson Fonseca International Airport**	AENA
Santiago	RS	SSST		RS0015	Santiago Airport	
Santo Ângelo	RS	SBNM	GEL	RS0008	**Sepé Tiaraju Regional Airport**	ON8
Santo Antônio do Içá	AM	SWII	IPG	AM0013	Ipiranga Airport	
São Benedito	CE	SWBE	JSB	CE0006	Valfrido Salmito de Almeida Airport	Visac
São Borja	RS	SSSB	JBS	RS0014	São Borja Airport	
São Carlos	SP	SDSC	QSC	SP0029	Mário Pereira Lopes International Airport	Rede Voa
São Félix do Araguaia	MT	SWFX	SXO	MT0022	São Félix do Araguaia Airport	
São Félix do Xingu	PA	SNFX	SXX	PA0013	São Félix do Xingu Airport	
São Gabriel da Cachoeira	AM	SBUA	SJL	AM0003	**São Gabriel da Cachoeira Airport**	
São João del-Rei	MG	SNJR	JDR	MG0034	**Pref. Octávio de Almeida Neves Airport**	Socicam
São José do Rio Preto	SP	SBSR	SJP	SP0006	**Prof. Eribelto Manoel Reino State Airport**	ASP
São José dos Campos	SP	SBSJ	SJK	SP0008	**Prof. Urbano Ernesto Stumpf International Airport**	SJK Airport
São Lourenço	MG	SNLO	SSO	MG0037	Comte. Luiz Carlos de Oliveira Airport	
São Luís	MA	SBSL	SLZ	MA0001	**Mal. Cunha Machado International Airport**	ASUR
São Manuel	SP	SDNO		SP0061	Nelson Garófalo State Airport	Rede Voa
São Miguel do Oeste	SC	SSOE	SQX	SC0015	**Hélio Wasum Airport**	
São Paulo	SP	SBMT	RTE	SP0007	Campo de Marte Airport	Pax Aeroportos
São Paulo	SP	SBSP	CGH	SP0001	**Congonhas–Dep. Freitas Nobre Airport**	AENA
São Paulo / Guarulhos	SP	SBGR	GRU	SP0002	**Gov. André Franco Montoro International Airport**	GRU Airport
São Paulo / São Roque	SP	SBJH	JHF	SP1176	São Paulo Catarina International Executive Airport	JHSF Participações
São Paulo de Olivença	AM	SDCG	OLC	AM0016	Sen. Eunice Michiles Airport	
São Pedro	SP	SDAE		SP0053	Octavio Moura Andrade Airport	Municipality
São Raimundo Nonato	PI	SWKQ	NSR	PI0004	Niède Guidon–Serra da Capivara Regional Airport	GRU Airport
Serra Talhada	PE	SNHS	SET	PE0005	Santa Magalhães Airport	GRU Airport
Sinop	MT	SBSI	OPS	MT0002	**Pres. João Figueiredo Airport**	Aeroeste
Sobral	CE	SN6L	JSO	CE0164	Luciano de Arruda Coelho Regional Airport	Visac
Sobral	CE	SNOB	QBX	CE0013	Cel. Virgílio Távora Lima Airport	
Sorocaba	SP	SDCO	SOD	SP0027	Bertram Luiz Leupolz State Airport	Rede Voa
Sorriso	MT	SBSO	SMT	MT0005	**Adolino Bedin Regional Airport**	Infraero
Tabatinga	AM	SBTT	TBT	AM0005	**Tabatinga International Airport**	Vinci SA
Tangará da Serra	MT	SWTS	TGQ	MT0012	Tangará da Serra Airport	
Tarauacá	AC	SBTK	TRQ	AC0004	José Galera dos Santos Airport	Deracre
Tauá	CE	SDZG	JTA	CE0008	Pedro Teixeira Castelo Airport	Visac
Tefé	AM	SBTF	TFF	AM0004	**Pref. Orlando Marinho Airport**	Vinci SA
Teixeira de Freitas	BA	SNTF	TXF	BA0016	9 de maio Airport	Seinfra
Telêmaco Borba	PR	SSVL	TEC	PR0007	Monte Alegre Airport	SEIL / Klabin S/A
Teófilo Otoni	MG	SNTO	TFL	MG0048	Kemil Kumaira Airport	
Teresina	PI	SBTE	THE	PI0001	**Sen. Petrônio Portella Airport**	ASUR
Toledo	PR	SBTD	TOW	PR0008	Luiz dal Canalle Filho Airport	SEIL
Torres	RS	SSTE	TSQ	RS0011	Torres Airport	Infraero
Três Lagoas	MS	SBTG	TJL	MS0006	Plínio Alarcom Airport	
Tucuruí	PA	SBTU	TUR	PA0007	**Tucuruí Regional Airport**	Esaero
Tupã	SP	SDTP		SP0025	José Vicente Faria Lima State Airport	ASP
Ubatuba	SP	SDUB	UBT	SP0065	Gastão Madeira State Airport	Rede Voa
Uberaba	MG	SBUR	UBA	MG0009	**Mário de Almeida Franco Airport**	AENA
Uberlândia	MG	SBUL	UDI	MG0002	**Ten. Cel. Av. César Bombonato Airport**	AENA
Umuarama	PR	SSUM	UMU	PR0019	Orlando de Carvalho Airport	Infracea
Una	BA	SBTC	UNA	BA0067	**Una-Comandatuba Airport**	Socicam
União da Vitória	PR	SSUV	UVI	PR0034	**José Cleto Airport**	SEIL
Uruguaiana	RS	SBUG	URG	RS0012	**Ruben Berta International Airport**	ASUR
Vacaria	RS	SNEE	VCC	RS0004	Vacaria Airport	
Valença	BA	SNVB	VAL	BA0008	Valença Airport	
Varginha	MG	SBVG	VAG	MG0019	**Maj. Brig. Trompowsky Airport**	
Videira	SC	SSVI	VIA	SC0011	Ângelo Ponzoni Airport	Municipality
Vila Rica	MT	SWVC	VLP	MT0016	Vila Rica Airport	
Vilhena	RO	SBVH	BVH	RO0003	**Brig. Camarão Airport**	GRU Airport
Vitória	ES	SBVT	VIX	ES0001	**Eurico de Aguiar Salles International Airport**	Zurich Airport Brasil
Vitória da Conquista	BA	SBVC	VDC	BA0005	**Glauber Rocha Airport**	Socicam
Votuporanga	SP	SDVG		SP0026	Domingos Pignatari State Airport	ASP
Xinguara	PA	SWSX	XIG	PA0150	Xinguara Municipal Airport	

Note:
^{a}: Since August 14, 2023, SURV is a special case being a binational facility, serving both Brazil and Uruguay.

== Notable former airports ==
City served	State	Airport name	Closure	Notes
Manaus	AM	Ponta Pelada Airport	1976	Became Manaus Air Force Base
Natal / Parnamirim	RN	Augusto Severo International Airport	2014	Became exclusively Natal Air Force Base
Rio de Janeiro	RJ	Bartolomeu de Gusmão Airport	1942	Became Santa Cruz Air Force Base
Rio de Janeiro	RJ	Campo dos Afonsos Airport	1941	Became Afonsos Air Force Base

== Defunct airports ==
City served	State	Airport name	Closed	Notes and present use
Barreirinhas	MA	Old Barreirinhas Airport	2021	Present location of Family Park
Belém	PA	Brig. Protásio de Oliveira Airport	2021	Present location of the City Park
Belo Horizonte	MG	Carlos Prates Airport	2023	
Boa Vista	RR	Old Boa Vista Airport	1973	Became an urbanized area
Brasília	DF	Vera Cruz Airport	1957	Present location of the former Integrated Bus and Train Terminal
Cacoal	RO	Old Cacoal Airport	2009	
Castilho	SP	Urubupungá–Ernesto Pochler Airport	2007	Closed and abandoned
Cuiabá	MT	Campo de Aviação de Cuiabá	1960	Became an urbanized area
Feijó	AC	Alcimar Leitão Airport	2008	Became an urbanized area
Foz do Iguaçu	PR	Iguassú National Park Airport	1974	Became a green area and GRESFI Club
Imperatriz	MA	Old Imperatriz Airport	1973	
Maringá	PR	Dr. Gastão Vidigal Airport	2001	Became an urbanized area
Palmas	TO	Old Palmas Airport	2001	Became an urbanized area
Parintins	AM	Old Parintins Airport	1980	Became an urbanized area including the Bumbódromo
Porto Velho	RO	Caiari Airport	1969	Became an urbanized area
Rio Branco	AC	Pres. Médici International Airport	1999	Became an urbanized area
Rio de Janeiro	RJ	Manguinhos Airport	1961	Became the urbanized area known as Maré neighborhood
Santarém	PA	Old Santarém Airport	1977	Became an urbanized area
São Carlos	SP	Salgado Filho Airport	2002	Became an urbanized area
Vitória da Conquista	BA	Pedro Otacílio Figueiredo Airport	2019	Will become an urbanized area including a Convention Center

== See also ==
- List of airports by ICAO code: S#SB SD SI SJ SN SS SW - Brazil
- List of the busiest airports in Brazil
- Transport in Brazil
