= Azul Conecta =

Brazilian regional airline

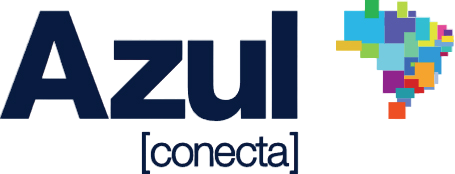
IATA	ICAO	Call sign
2F	ACN	AZUL CONECTA
- Founded: April 1, 2013; 13 years ago
- AOC #: 10,039 - December 14, 2022
- Operating bases: Belém; Belo Horizonte; Campinas; Cuiabá; Curitiba; Manaus; Recife; Santarém
- Frequent-flyer program: TudoAzul
- Fleet size: 27 (as of April 2024)
- Destinations: 50 (as of October 2025)
- Parent company: Azul Brazilian Airlines
- Headquarters: Jundiaí, Brazil
- Key people: Antônio Flávio Costa (President)
- Website: www.voeazul.com.br

Azul Conecta (stylized as Azul [Conecta]), formerly known as TwoFlex Aviação Inteligente, is a Brazilian domestic and subregional airline headquartered in Jundiaí, São Paulo, established in 2013. It is a subsidiary of Azul Brazilian Airlines, operating feeder and cargo flights connecting cities in the interior of Brazil to the parent company's hubs.

== History ==
=== Establishment ===
Azul Conecta was formed as TwoFlex on April 1, 2013, as a result of the merger of Two Táxi Aéreo and Flex Aero Táxi Aéreo.

Between August 2016 and June 2019, TwoFlex operated wet lease flights on behalf of Voe Minas Gerais, a state-run project that connected cities within the State of Minas Gerais to the State capital Belo Horizonte. TwoFlex was the only operator for the duration of this program, which was discontinued on June 30, 2019.

=== TwoFlex Aviação Inteligente (2017-2020) ===
In November 2017, Twoflex was granted rights to operate regular feeder passenger flights connecting smaller locations to main cities in all Brazilian territory. At the time, this authorization led to the increase of services provided by Voe Minas Gerais.

Being authorized to operate feeder services nationwide, on April 12, 2019, TwoFlex announced an adapted Essential Air Service partnership with GOL Linhas Aéreas in which TwoFlex would operate feeder services on behalf of Gol in the States of Amazonas, Pará and Mato Grosso. Following the same trend, flights to six locations in Rio Grande do Sul and eleven in Paraná were confirmed.

Another consequence of this authorization was being allowed to bid for slots at São Paulo–Congonhas Airport. On August 14, 2019, the National Civil Aviation Agency of Brazil confirmed that TwoFlex was granted 14 slots at Congonhas but can only operate using the auxiliary runway 17L/35R. TwoFlex plans to connect São Paulo-Congonhas with three cities in São Paulo State and one in Rio de Janeiro State.

=== Acquisition by Azul Brazilian Airlines (2020-present) ===
On 14 January 2020, Azul Brazilian Airlines signed an agreement to purchase Twoflex. On March 27, 2020, the Brazilian regulatory bodies gave its full permission (nihil obstat) to the purchase and sale of flights started on April 14, 2020. On 11 August 2020, the airline was rebranded as Azul Conecta to reflect its partnership with Azul Brazilian Airlines. It operates feeder services to bases of Azul.

On May 28, 2025, Azul Brazilian Airlines filed for Chapter 11 bankruptcy after being affected with higher expenses within the last year. The company has plans to shed up to $2 billion in debt, receive $1.6 billion in financing throughout the procedure, and an additional $950 million in financing upon exiting bankruptcy, with bondholders and strategic partners such as American Airlines and United Airlines supporting the restructuring. Azul stated that they plan to exit bankruptcy in the beginning of 2026.

== Destinations ==
As of October 2025, Azul Conecta serves 50 destinations in Brazil, feeding services of its sister company Azul Brazilian Airlines using its platform and operated by Azul Conecta:

Base
Future
Terminated

City	Airport	Notes
Água Boa	Água Boa Airport	
Alegrete	Gaudêncio Machado Ramos Airport	Terminated
Alenquer	Alenquer Airport	Terminated
Almeirim	Almeirim Airport	
Altamira	Altamira Airport	Terminated
Angra dos Reis	Carmelo Jordão Airport	Terminated
Apucarana	Capt. João Busse Airport	Terminated
Apuí	Apuí Airport	Terminated
Aracati	Dragão do Mar Regional Airport	Terminated
Araraquara	Bartholomeu de Gusmão Airport	
Araripina	Comandante Mairson Rodrigues Bezerra Airport	
Arapongas	Alberto Bertelli Airport	Terminated
Araxá	Romeu Zema Airport	Terminated
Aripuanã	Aripuanã Airport	
Ariquemes	Ariquemes Airport	Terminated
Armação dos Búzios	Umberto Modiano Airport	Terminated
Bagé	Comandante Gustavo Kraemer International Airport	Terminated
Barcelos	Barcelos Airport	Terminated
Barra do Garças	Barra do Garças Airport	
Barreirinhas	Barreirinhas Airport	Terminated
Barretos	Chafei Amsei Airport	
Bauru / Arealva	Moussa Nakhl Tobias Airport	Terminated
Belém	Val-de-Cans International Airport	HUB
Belo Horizonte	Tancredo Neves International Airport	HUB
Blumenau	Quero-quero Airport	Terminated
Borba	Borba Airport	
Breves	Breves Airport	
Cajazeiras	Pedro Vieira Moreira Airport	
Campinas	Viracopos International Airport	HUB
Campo Mourão	Cel. Geraldo Guias de Aquino Airport	Terminated
Campos dos Goytacazes	Bartolomeu Lysandro Airport	Terminated
Canela	Canela Airport	Terminated
Carajás (Parauapebas)	Carajás Airport	
Caruaru	Oscar Laranjeiras Airport	Terminated
Cianorte	Eng. Gastão Mesquita Airport	Terminated
Coari	Coari Airport	
Confresa	Confresa Airport	Terminated
Cornélio Procópio	Francisco Lacerda Jr. Airport	Terminated
Crateús	Dr. Lúcio Lima Airport	Terminated
Cuiabá	Marechal Rondon International Airport	HUB
Curitiba	Afonso Pena International Airport	HUB
Divinópolis	Divinópolis Airport	
Erechim	Erechim Airport	Terminated
Fortaleza	Pinto Martins International Airport	Terminated
Franca	Ten. Lund Presotto Airport	
Francisco Beltrão	Paulo Abdala Airport	Terminated
Garanhuns	Garanhuns Airport	
Goiânia	Santa Genoveva International Airport	
Guaíra	Walter Martins de Oliveira Municipal Airport	
Guanambi	Isaac Moura Rocha Airport	Terminated
Guarapari	Guarapari Airport	Terminated
Iguatu	Dr. Francisco Tomé da Frota Airport	Terminated
Itaituba	Itaituba Airport	Terminated
Itanhaém	Antônio Ribeiro Nogueira Jr. Airport	Terminated
Jijoca de Jericoacoara	Comte. Ariston Pessoa Regional Airport	Terminated
Ji-Paraná	José Coleto Airport Airport	
Juína	Juína Airport	
Juiz de Fora	Pres. Itamar Franco Airport	Terminated
Jundiaí	Comte. Rolim Adolfo Amaro State Airport	Terminated
Juruti	Juruti Airport	
Lábrea	Lábrea Airport	
Linhares	Antônio Edson de Azevedo Lima Regional Airport	
Macaé	Joaquim de Azevedo Mancebo Airport	Terminated
Macapá	Alberto Alcolumbre International Airport	Terminated
Manaus	Eduardo Gomes International Airport	HUB
Manhuaçu	Elias Breder Airport	
Manicoré	Manicoré Airport	
Marília	Frank Miloye Milenkovich Airport	Terminated
Maués	Maués Airport	
Monte Alegre	Monte Alegre Airport	
Monte Dourado (Almeirim)	Serra do Areão Airport	
Mossoró	Gov. Dix-Sept Rosado Municipal Airport	Terminated
Natal	Governador Aluízio Alves International Airport	Terminated
Oriximiná	Oriximiná Airport	
Ourilândia do Norte	Ourilândia do Norte Airport	
Paracatu	Pedro Rabelo de Souza Airport	
Paragominas	Nagib Demachki Airport	
Paranaguá	Santos Dumont Airport	Terminated
Paranavaí	Edu Chaves Airport	Terminated
Paraty	Paraty Airport	Terminated
Parintins	Júlio Belém Airport	Terminated
Parnaíba	Prefeito Dr. João Silva Filho International Airport	Terminated
Passo Fundo	Lauro Kurtz Airport	Terminated
Pato Branco	Juvenal Loureiro Cardoso Airport	Terminated
Patos	Brigadeiro Firmino Ayres Airport	
Patos de Minas	Pedro Pereira dos Santos Airport	Terminated
Pimenta Bueno	Euflávio Odilon Pinheiro Airport	
Porto Alegre	Salgado Filho Porto Alegre International Airport	Terminated
Porto de Moz	Porto de Moz Airport	
Porto Trombetas (Oriximiná)	Porto Trombetas Airport	
Porto Velho	Governador Jorge Teixeira de Oliveira International Airport	
Recife	Gilberto Freyre International Airport	HUB
Rio Grande	Gustavo Cramer Airport	Terminated
Rio de Janeiro	Jacarepaguá–Roberto Marinho Airport	
Rio de Janeiro	Santos Dumont Airport	Terminated
Salinas	Salinas Airport	Terminated
Salinópolis	Salinópolis Airport	
Salvador da Bahia	Deputado Luís Eduardo Magalhães International Airport	
Santa Cruz do Sul	Luiz Beck da Silva Airport	Terminated
Santa Isabel do Rio Negro	Tapuruquara Airport	
Santa Rosa	Luís Alberto Lehr Airport	Terminated
Santana do Livramento / Rivera	Pres. Gral. Óscar D. Gestido International Airport^{a}	Terminated
Santarém	Maestro Wilson Fonseca Airport	HUB
São Benedito	Walfrido Salmito de Almeida Airport	Terminated
São Borja	São Borja Airport	Terminated
São Félix do Araguaia	São Félix do Araguaia Airport	Terminated
São Luís	Marechal Cunha Machado International Airport	Terminated
São Paulo	Congonhas Airport	Terminated
Serra Talhada	Santa Magalhães Airport	Terminated
Sobral	Cel. Virgílio Távora Airport	Terminated
Sobral	Luciano de Arruda Coelho Airport	Terminated
Tangará da Serra	Tangará da Serra Airport	Terminated
Tauá	Pedro Teixeira Castelo Airport	Terminated
Tefé	Pref. Orlando Marinho Airport	Terminated
Telêmaco Borba	Telêmaco Borba-Monte Alegre Airport	Terminated
Teófilo Otoni	Kemil Kumaira Airport	Terminated
Torres	Torres Airport	Terminated
Tucuruí	Tucuruí Airport	
Ubatuba	Gastão Medina Airport	Terminated
Umuarama	Orlando de Carvalho Airport	Terminated
União da Vitória	José Cleto Airport	
Vacaria	Vacaria Airport	Terminated
Varginha	Major-Brigadeiro Trompowsky Airport	
Vilhena	Brigadeiro Camarão Airport	Terminated

a.Although Santana do Livramento (Brazil) is the destination listed, because of operational reasons flights operated at Rivera International Airport located in the twin city Rivera, Uruguay.

== Fleet ==
As of April 2024, Azul Conecta operates the following aircraft:

Azul Conecta fleet
Aircraft	In service	Orders	Passengers	Note
Cessna 208A Caravan	2	—	9	TwoFlex cs
Cessna 208B Grand Caravan	12	—	9	—
Cessna 208B Grand Caravan EX	9	—	9	—
Cessna 208B Super Cargomaster	3	—	Cargo	opby Azul Conecta Cargo
TOTAL	26	—		

== Airline affinity program ==
Azul Conecta accrue benefits as per Azul Brazilian Airlines Frequent Flyer Program program Tudo Azul.

== Accidents and incidents ==
- 16 September 2019: Cessna 208 Caravan registration PT-MHC operating a flight from Manaus to Maués crashed in a wooded area on takeoff. All ten on board survived the accident. Thunderstorms were present in the area around the time of departure. The aircraft was damaged beyond repair.
- 5 May 2024: Cessna 208 Caravan registration PS-CNB was stuck at Salgado Filho Porto Alegre International Airport after the apron and runways were flooded during the 2024 Rio Grande do Sul floods. On 22 June 2024, the aircraft was flown to the airline maintenance base at Jundiaí Airport.

== See also ==
- List of airlines of Brazil
