= Departamento Aeroportuário (RS) =

Departamento Aeroportuário (DAP) (English: Department of Airports) is the department of aviation of the state of Rio Grande do Sul in Brazil. DAP is part of the Secretaria de Transportes do Governo do Estado do Rio Grande do Sul (English: Transportation Secretariat of the State of Rio Grande do Sul), and is responsible for the operation of seven public airports within the state, in accordance to directives from the National Civil Aviation Agency of Brazil (ANAC).

It was created on January 30, 1950.

== List of airports administered by DAP ==
The following airports are administered by DAP:

- Carazinho
- Erechim – Erechim Airport
- Ijuí – João Batista Bos Filho Airport
- Rio Grande – Rio Grande Regional Airport
- Santa Rosa – Luís Alberto Lehr Airport

== List of airports once managed by DAP ==
The following airports were once managed by DAP:

- Caxias do Sul – Hugo Cantergiani Airport (Campo dos Bugres Airport)
- Passo Fundo – Lauro Kurtz Airport
- Santo Ângelo – Sepé Tiaraju Airport
- Torres – Torres Airport

== See also ==
- List of airports in Brazil
