= PFB =

PFB or pfb may refer to:

- Perfluorobutane, a fluorocarbon gas
- Printer Font Binary, a binary PostScript font file
- Pseudofolliculitis barbae, a medical term for persistent inflammation caused by shaving
- Lauro Kurtz Airport (IATA code), near Passo Fundo, Brazil
