= CXJ =

CXJ may refer to:

- CXJ (airline), a defunct Chinese airline
- CXJ (airport), a Brazilian public airport
