= Planalto Serrano Regional Airport =

Planalto Serrano Regional Airport Aeroporto Regional do Planalto Serrano
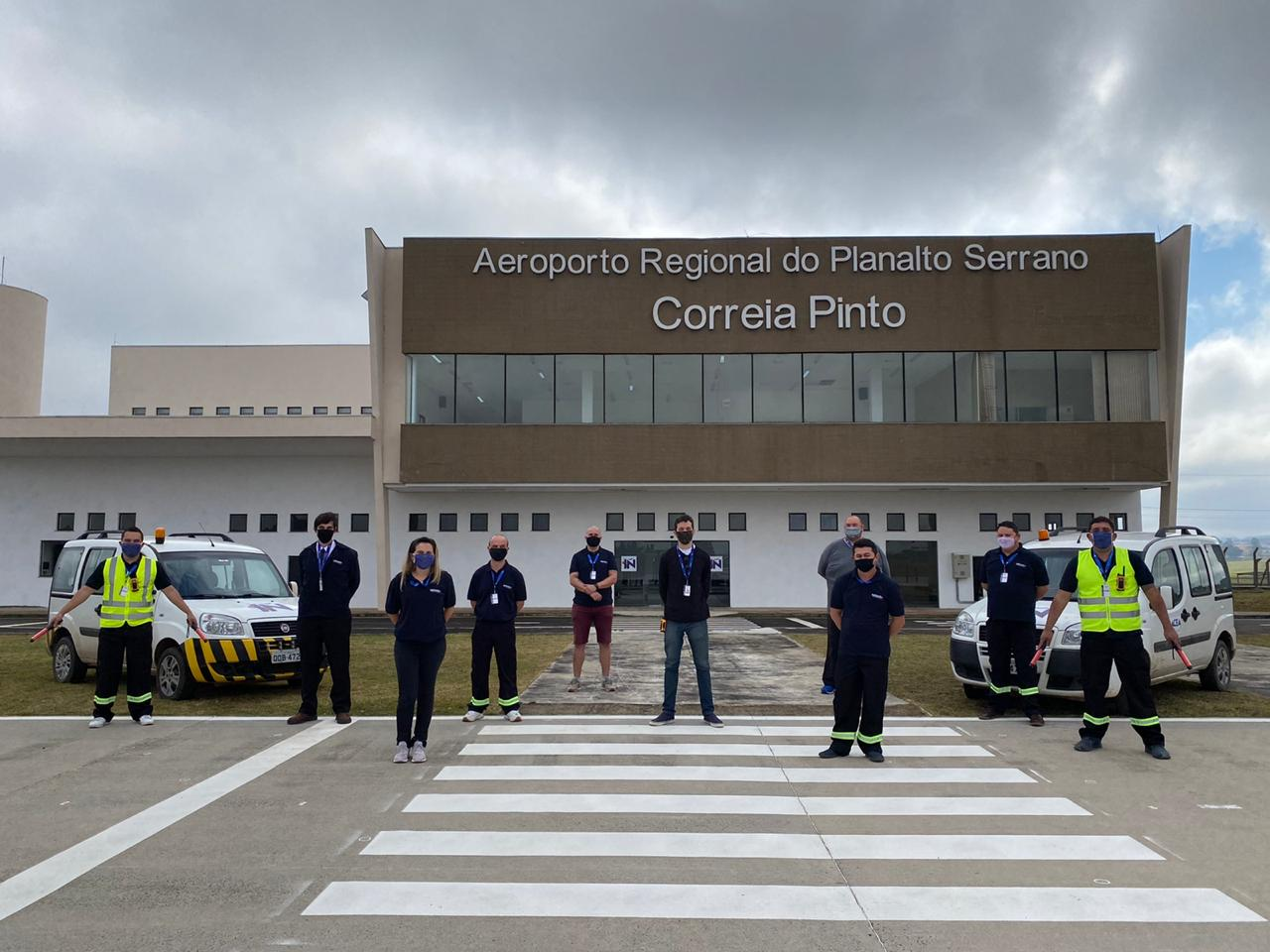
- IATA: EEA; ICAO: SNCP; LID: SC0181

Summary
- Airport type: Public
- Operator: Infraero (2018–2020); Infracea (2020–present)
- Serves: Correia Pinto, Lages
- Time zone: BRT (UTC−03:00)
- Elevation AMSL: 880 m (2,890 ft)
- Coordinates: 27°38′03″S 050°21′30″W

Map
- Location in Brazil

Runways
| Direction | Length | | Surface |
| Direction | m | ft | Surface |
|---|---|---|---|
| 09/27 | 1,802 | 5,912 | Asphalt |
- Sources: ANAC, DECEA

Planalto Serrano Regional Airport (IATA: EEA, ICAO: SNCP) is the airport serving Correia Pinto and Lages, Brazil.

It is operated by Infracea.

== History ==
The airport was managed by contract by Infraero between January 18, 2018 and July 20, 2020, when administration was taken over by Infracea.

== Airlines and destinations ==
| Airlines | Destinations |
|---|---|
| Azul Conecta | Florianópolis, São Miguel do Oeste |
| Gol Linhas Aéreas | São Paulo–Congonhas |

== Access ==
The airport is located 7 km (4 mi) from downtown Correia Pinto and 28 km (17 mi) from downtown Lages.

== See also ==
- List of airports in Brazil
