= QGP =

QGP may refer to:

- Quark–gluon plasma, in physics
- Garanhuns Airport (IATA code), Brazil
- QGP, a Q code for radio services
