= Blumenau Airport =

Quero-quero Airport Aeroporto Quero-quero
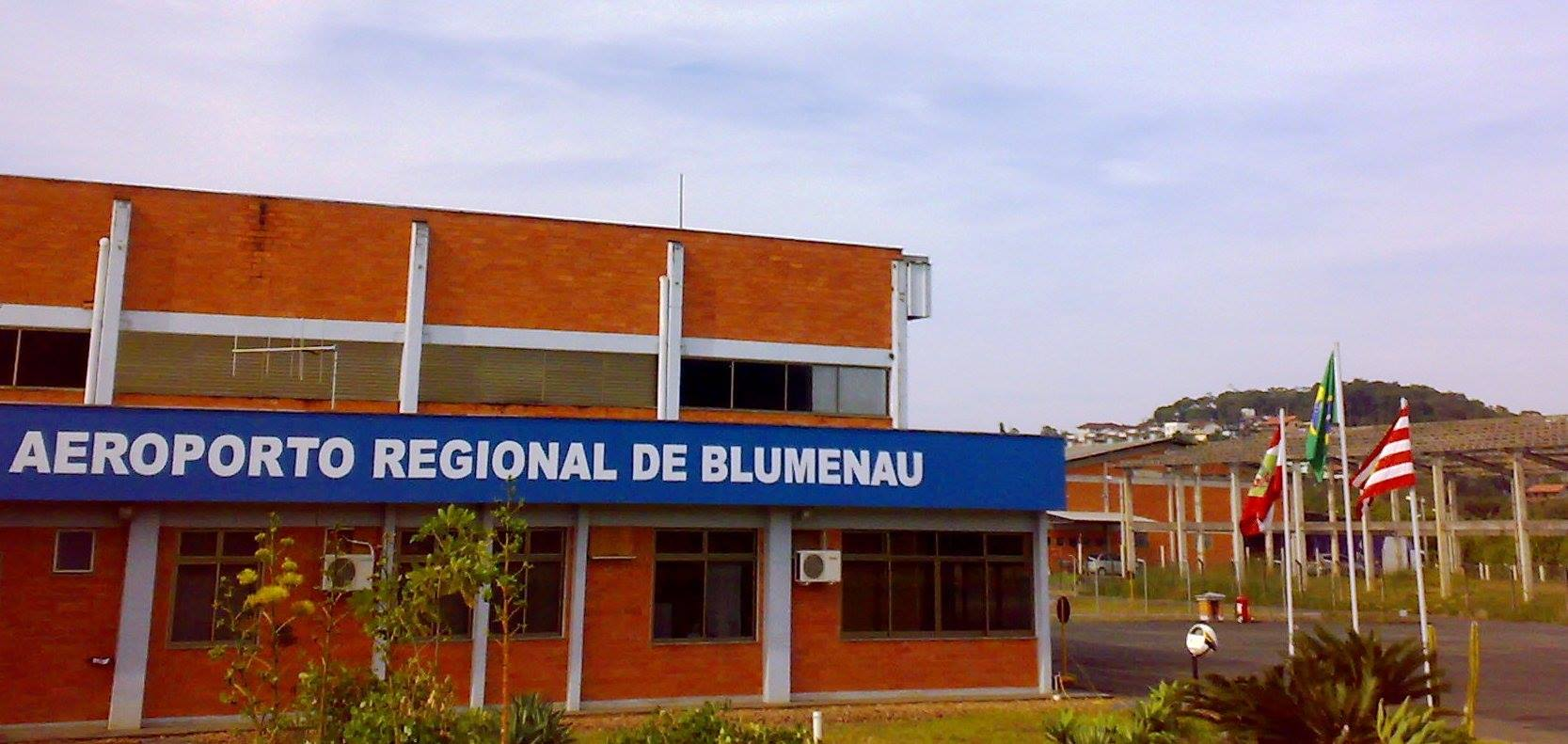
- IATA: BNU; ICAO: SSBL; LID: SC0019

Summary
- Airport type: Public
- Serves: Blumenau
- Time zone: BRT (UTC−03:00)
- Elevation AMSL: 18 m (59 ft)
- Coordinates: 26°49′54″S 049°05′37″W

Map
- Location in Brazil

Runways
Direction	Length		Surface
Direction	m	ft	Surface
18/36	1,450	3,543	Asphalt
- Sources: ANAC, DECEA

Quero-quero Airport (IATA: BNU, ICAO: SSBL), is the airport serving Blumenau, Brazil. It is named after a bird found in the area: Vanellus chilensis (Southern lapwing).

== Airlines and destinations ==
Airlines	Destinations
Azul Conecta	Florianópolis

== Access ==
The airport is located 13 km (8 mi) from downtown Blumenau.

== See also ==
- List of airports in Brazil
