= Picos Airport =

Airport serving Picos, Brazil

Sen. Helvídio Nunes Regional Airport Aeroporto Regional Sen. Helvídio Nunes
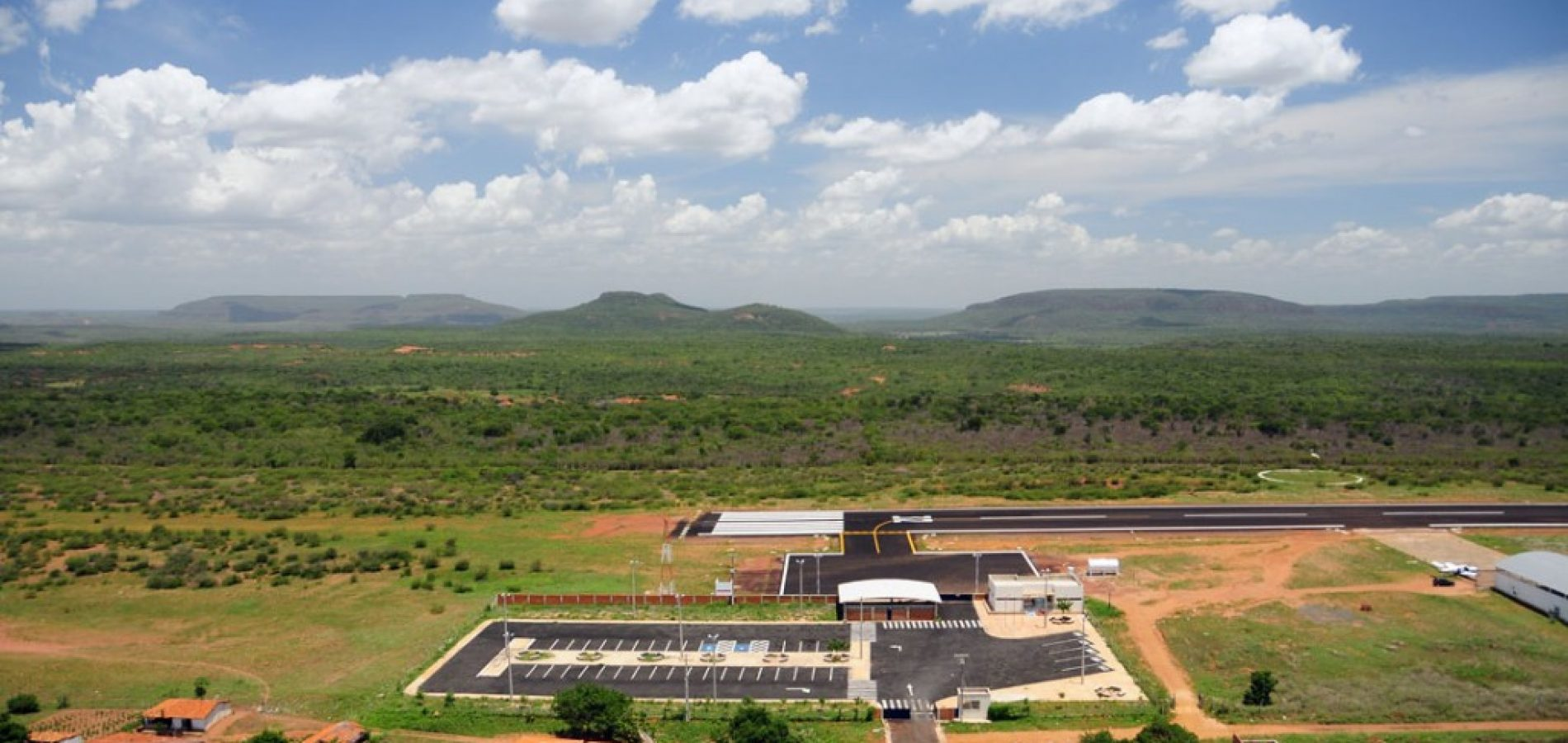
- IATA: PCS; ICAO: SNPC; LID: PI0009

Summary
- Airport type: Public
- Operator: Esaero
- Serves: Picos
- Time zone: BRT (UTC−03:00)
- Elevation AMSL: 335 m (1,099 ft)
- Coordinates: 07°03′41″S 041°31′33″W
- Website: grupotw8.aero/aeroporto-regional-de-picos-ggs/

Map
- Location in Brazil

Runways
Direction	Length		Surface
Direction	m	ft	Surface
14/32	1,641	5,384	Asphalt
- Sources: Airport Website, ANAC, DECEA

Sen. Helvídio Nunes Regional Airport (IATA: PCS, ICAO: SNPC) is the airport serving Picos, Brazil. The airport is named after Helvídio Nunes de Barros (1925–2000), former mayor of Picos, governor of Piauí and Senator.

It is operated by Esaero.

== History ==
In 2011 the airport was renovated.

== Access ==
The airport is located 8 km (5 mi) from downtown Picos.

== See also ==
- List of airports in Brazil
