= Oeiras Airport =

Oeiras Airport Aeroporto de Oeiras
- IATA: none; ICAO: SNOE; LID: PI0008

Summary
- Operator: Esaero
- Serves: Oeiras
- Opened: January 23, 2022
- Time zone: BRT (UTC−03:00)
- Elevation AMSL: 266 m / 873 ft
- Coordinates: 07°01′06″S 042°10′02″W

Map
- Location in Brazil

Runways
Direction	Length		Surface
Direction	m	ft	Surface
12/30	1,200	3,937	Asphalt
- Sources: ANAC, DECEA

Oeiras Airport (ICAO: SNOE) is the airport serving Oeiras, Brazil.

It is operated by Esaero.

== History ==
In February 2011 plans for the construction of a passenger terminal at Oeiras Airport were announced. On January 23, 2022 the facility was dedicated.

== Airlines and destinations ==
No scheduled flights operate at this airport.

== Access ==
The airport is located 7 km (4 mi) from downtown Oeiras.

== See also ==
- List of airports in Brazil
