= São Miguel do Oeste Airport =

Hélio Wasum Airport Aeroporto Hélio Wasum
- IATA: SQX; ICAO: SSOE; LID: SC0015

Summary
- Airport type: Public
- Serves: São Miguel do Oeste
- Time zone: BRT (UTC−03:00)
- Elevation AMSL: 665 m (2,182 ft)
- Coordinates: 26°46′52″S 053°30′12″W

Map
- Location in Brazil

Runways
Direction	Length		Surface
Direction	m	ft	Surface
17/35	1,260	4,134	Asphalt
- Sources: ANAC, DECEA

Hélio Wasum Airport (IATA: SQX, ICAO: SSOE) is the airport serving São Miguel do Oeste, Brazil.

== History ==
The airport was opened in 1960.

== Airlines and destinations ==
Airlines	Destinations
Azul Conecta	Correia Pinto, Florianópolis

== Access ==
The airport is located 8 km (5 mi) from downtown São Miguel do Oeste.

== See also ==
- List of airports in Brazil
