= Vini (footballer) =

Brazilian footballer (born 1984)

Personal information
- Full name: Vinicius Frasson
- Date of birth: August 31, 1984 (age 42)
- Place of birth: São Miguel do Oeste, Brazil
- Height: 1.83 m (6 ft 0 in)
- Position: Striker

Youth career
- 2000–2003: SER Caxias
- 2003–2004: Avaí FC

Senior career*
Years	Team	Apps	(Gls)
2005	FCK Salamat	11	(3)
2006	AC Allianssi	0	(0)
2007	Racing Club Portuense	0	(0)
2008	ASD Manzanese	6	(1)
2009	Lohjan Pallo	24	(6)
2010–2011	FC Futura	45	(30)
2011	MyPa	11	(1)
2013	Metropolitano	4	(0)
2014	FC Futura	10	(2)
- * Club domestic league appearances and goals as of 2 August 2024

Vinicius Frasson (born August 31, 1984 in São Miguel do Oeste), is an Italian Brazilian former footballer.
