= Caçador Airport =

Dr. Carlos Alberto da Costa Neves Airport Aeroporto Dr. Carlos Alberto da Costa Neves
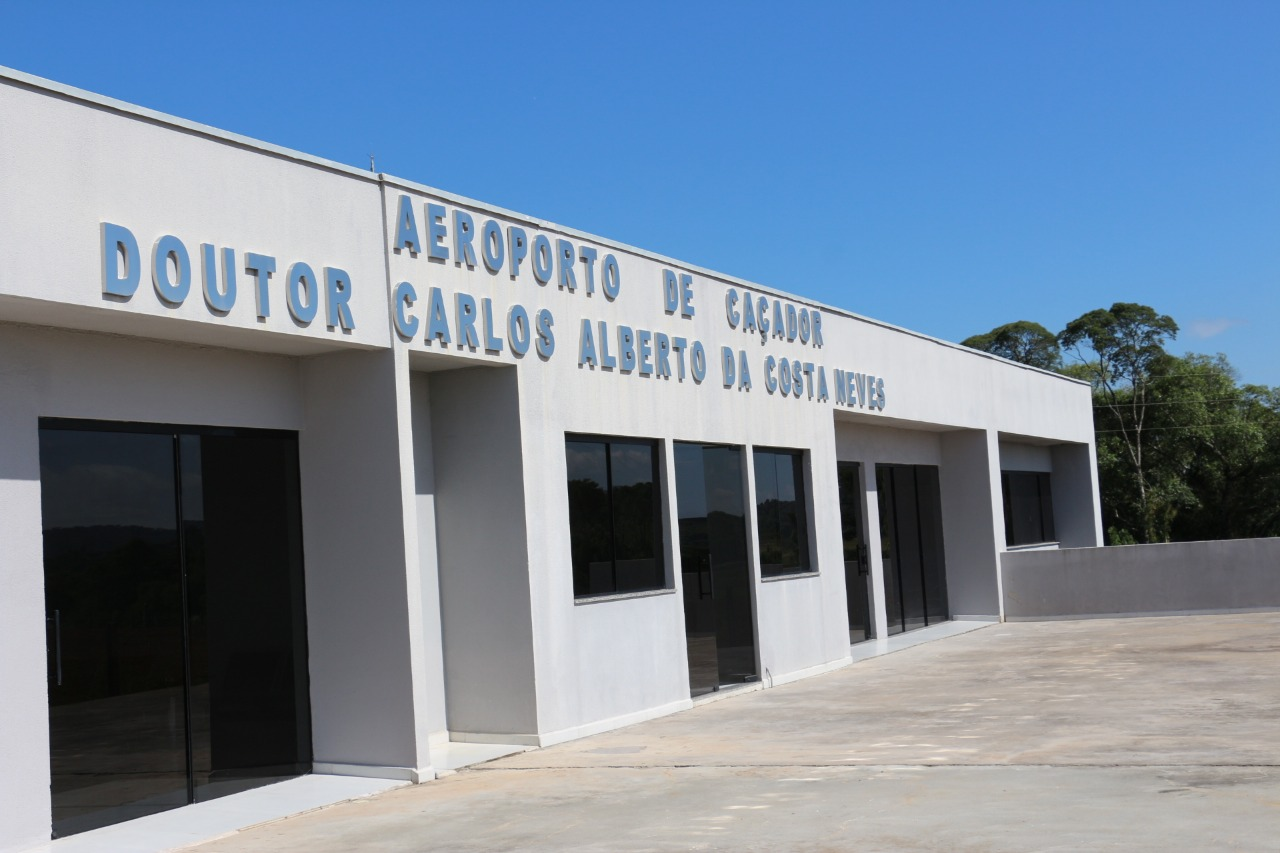
- IATA: CFC; ICAO: SBCD; LID: SC0006

Summary
- Airport type: Public
- Serves: Caçador
- Time zone: BRT (UTC−03:00)
- Elevation AMSL: 1,029 m (3,376 ft)
- Coordinates: 26°47′17″S 050°56′24″W

Map
- Location in Brazil

Runways
Direction	Length		Surface
Direction	m	ft	Surface
02/20	1,873	6,145	Asphalt
- Sources: ANAC, DECEA

Dr. Carlos Alberto da Costa Neves Airport (IATA: CFC, ICAO: SBCD) is the airport serving Caçador, Brazil.

== Airlines and destinations ==
Airlines	Destinations
Azul Conecta	Florianópolis

== Access ==
The airport is located 9 km (6 mi) east from downtown Caçador.

== See also ==
- List of airports in Brazil
