= Lages Airport =

Antônio Correia Pinto de Macedo Airport Aeroporto Antônio Correia Pinto de Macedo
- IATA: LAJ; ICAO: SBLJ; LID: SC0007

Summary
- Airport type: Public
- Operator: Infracea
- Serves: Lages
- Time zone: BRT (UTC−03:00)
- Elevation AMSL: 934 m (3,064 ft)
- Coordinates: 27°46′56″S 050°16′54″W

Map
- Location in Brazil

Runways
Direction	Length		Surface
Direction	m	ft	Surface
17/35	1,532	5,026	Asphalt
- Sources: ANAC, DECEA

Antônio Correia Pinto de Macedo Airport (IATA: LAJ, ICAO: SBLJ), formerly called Guarujá Federal Airport is the airport serving Lages, Brazil.

It is operated by Infracea.

== Airlines and destinations ==
Airlines	Destinations
Azul Conecta	Florianópolis

== Accidents and incidents ==
- 18 May 1997: During celebrations marking the 55th anniversary of the Lages Flying Club, at around 5:10 PM, two aircraft collided in mid-air, killing all 12 people on board as well as one person on the ground. The aircraft PT-ISM Cessna 182 Skylane was taking off to drop two skydivers as part of the celebrations, while the aircraft PT-IJA, a Cessna 310 was making a low pass over the crowd, to the right of the centerline of the active runway. Subsequently, the pilot of the PT-IJA executed a sharp recovery maneuver, colliding with the PT-ISM, which was climbing along the takeoff path at an altitude of approximately 500 feet. Both aircraft were destroyed, and the eight occupants of the PT-IJA and the four occupants of the PT-ISM died at the scene.
- 2 April 2010: during a performance by the Smoke Squadron celebrating the anniversary of Lages Airport, an Embraer EMB-312 Tucano T-27 aircraft crashed to the left of the threshold of runway 35. The crash occurred while the pilot was performing a Stall turn maneuver followed by a spin and a solo Lomcovak, resulting in the death of 33-year-old Captain Anderson Amaro Fernandes. Six months after the accident, on October 11, 2010, the Smoke Squadron returned to Lages to conclude its performance and pay tribute to the captain who had died in the crash. On that day, an airport hangar was named after the deceased pilot in his honor.

== Access ==
The airport is located 6 km (4 mi) from downtown Lages.

== See also ==
- List of airports in Brazil
