= Aeródromo Nacional de Aviação =

National Aviation Aerodrome Aeródromo Nacional de Aviação
- IATA: none; ICAO: SBNV; LID: GO0002

Summary
- Airport type: Public
- Serves: Goiânia
- Time zone: BRT (UTC−03:00)
- Elevation AMSL: 833 m / 2,733 ft
- Coordinates: 16°37′32″S 049°20′58″W

Map
- Location in Brazil

Runways
Direction	Length		Surface
Direction	m	ft	Surface
14/32	1,100	3,609	Asphalt
- Sources: ANAC, DECEA

National Aviation Aerodrome (ICAO: SBNV) is an aerodrome in Goiânia, Brazil.

== History ==
The aerodrome dedicated to general aviation.

== Airlines and destinations ==
No scheduled flights operate at this aerodrome.

== Access ==
The aerodrome is located 14 km (9 mi) from downtown Goiânia.

== See also ==
- List of airports in Brazil
