= Ijuí Airport =

Airport in Brazil

João Batista Bos Filho Airport Aeroporto João Batista Bos Filho
- IATA: IJU; ICAO: SSIJ; LID: RS0032

Summary
- Airport type: Public
- Operator: DAP
- Serves: Ijuí
- Time zone: BRT (UTC−03:00)
- Elevation AMSL: 365 m / 1,197 ft
- Coordinates: 28°22′07″S 053°50′47″W

Map
- Location in Brazil IJU (Brazil)

Runways
Direction	Length		Surface
Direction	m	ft	Surface
18/36	1,280	4,199	Asphalt
- Sources: ANAC, DECEA

João Batista Bos Filho Airport (IATA: IJU, ICAO: SSIJ) is the airport serving Ijuí, Brazil.

It is operated by DAP.

== Airlines and destinations ==
No scheduled flights operate at this airport.

== Access ==
The airport is located 8 km (5 mi) from downtown Ijuí.

== See also ==
- List of airports in Brazil
