= Isa Souza =

Brazilian and American television chef

- Born: January 26, 1975 (age 51); Santa Rosa, Brazil
- Education: The French Culinary Institute
- Culinary career
- Cooking style: American, Italian, Thai and Tunisian
- Television show
- "Isa Vida y Sabor"
- Website: chefisasouza.com

Isa Souza is a Brazilian and American chef and former lawyer best known for her work on the show Isa Vida y Sabor.

== Education ==
Souza was born in Santa Rosa. She first worked as a lawyer, graduating from Unijui and working in Porto Alegre. After obtaining a MA in Law she practiced in countries like Italy and Spain. However, she was unable to practice after moving to Miami due to regulations for lawyers in the United States and decided to become a chef instead. She later studied at the French Culinary Institute, graduating after the first season of the show, learning techniques from Master Chefs Herve Malivert and Dave Arnold.

== Career ==
Her career has allowed her to participate in different events and productions. She intended to begin a pasta boutique, before being tapped by a producer for the TV show Isa Vida y Sabor, which was released in both the United States and El Salvador and ran for multiple seasons. It was aired in Spanish, despite her being Brazilian with a first language of Portuguese. In 2013 she wrote the book Isa Vida y Sabor to share some of her recipes and techniques with a broader audience. Her recipes sought to provide healthy and easy options. She also ran a blog.
