= Nova Mutum Airport =

Brig. Eduardo Gomes Airport Aeroporto Brig. Eduardo Gomes
- IATA: NVM; ICAO: SDNM; LID: MT0047

Summary
- Airport type: Public
- Serves: Nova Mutum
- Time zone: BRT−1 (UTC−04:00)
- Elevation AMSL: 430 m (1,410 ft)
- Coordinates: 13°49′16″S 056°02′19″W

Map
- Location in Brazil

Runways
Direction	Length		Surface
Direction	m	ft	Surface
05/23	1,541	5,056	Asphalt
- Sources: ANAC, DECEA

Brig. Eduardo Gomes (IATA: NVM, ICAO: SDNM), is the airport serving Nova Mutum, Brazil.

== Access ==
The airport is located 7 km (4 mi) from downtown Nova Mutum.

== See also ==
- List of airports in Brazil
