= Maués Airport =

Maués Airport Aeroporto de Maués
- IATA: MBZ; ICAO: SWMW; LID: AM0020

Summary
- Airport type: Public
- Serves: Maués
- Time zone: BRT−1 (UTC−04:00)
- Elevation AMSL: 21 m (69 ft)
- Coordinates: 03°22′19″S 057°43′29″W

Map
- Location in Brazil

Runways
Direction	Length		Surface
Direction	m	ft	Surface
01/19	1,200	3,937	Asphalt
- Sources: ANAC, DECEA

Maués Airport (IATA: MBZ, ICAO: SWMW) is the airport serving Maués, Brazil.

== Airlines and destinations ==
Airlines	Destinations
Azul Conecta	Manaus

== Access ==
The airport is located 2 km (1 mi) from downtown Maués.

== See also ==
- List of airports in Brazil
