= Torres Airport (Brazil) =

Torres Airport Aeroporto de Torres

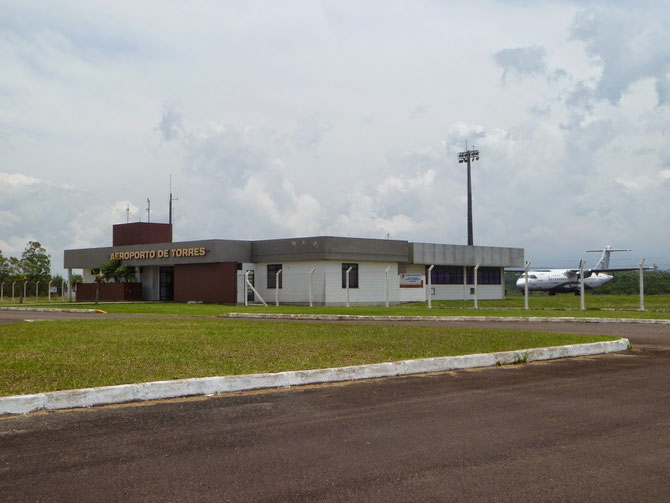
- IATA: TSQ; ICAO: SSTE; LID: RS0011

Summary
- Airport type: Public
- Operator: DAP (?–2024); Infraero (2024–present)
- Serves: Torres
- Time zone: BRT (UTC−03:00)
- Elevation AMSL: 9 m (30 ft)
- Coordinates: 29°24′54″S 049°48′36″W
- Website: www4.infraero.gov.br/aeroporto-de-torres/

Map
- Location in Brazil TSQ (Brazil)

Runways
| Direction | Length | | Surface |
| Direction | m | ft | Surface |
|---|---|---|---|
| 06/24 | 1,507 | 4,944 | Asphalt |

Statistics (2025)
- Passengers: 7,512
- Aircraft Operations: 4,217
- Statistics: Infraero; Sources: Airport Website, ANAC, DECEA

Torres Airport (IATA: TSQ, ICAO: SSTE), formerly SBTR, is the airport serving Torres, Brazil.

It is operated by Infraero.

== History ==
On July 14, 2024 the State of Rio Grande do Sul signed a contract of operation with Infraero. Previously the airport was operated by DAP.

== Access ==
The airport is located 15 km (9 mi) from downtown Torres.

== See also ==
- List of airports in Brazil
