= São Carlos International Airport =

Mário Pereira Lopes State Airport Aeroporto Estadual Mário Pereira Lopes
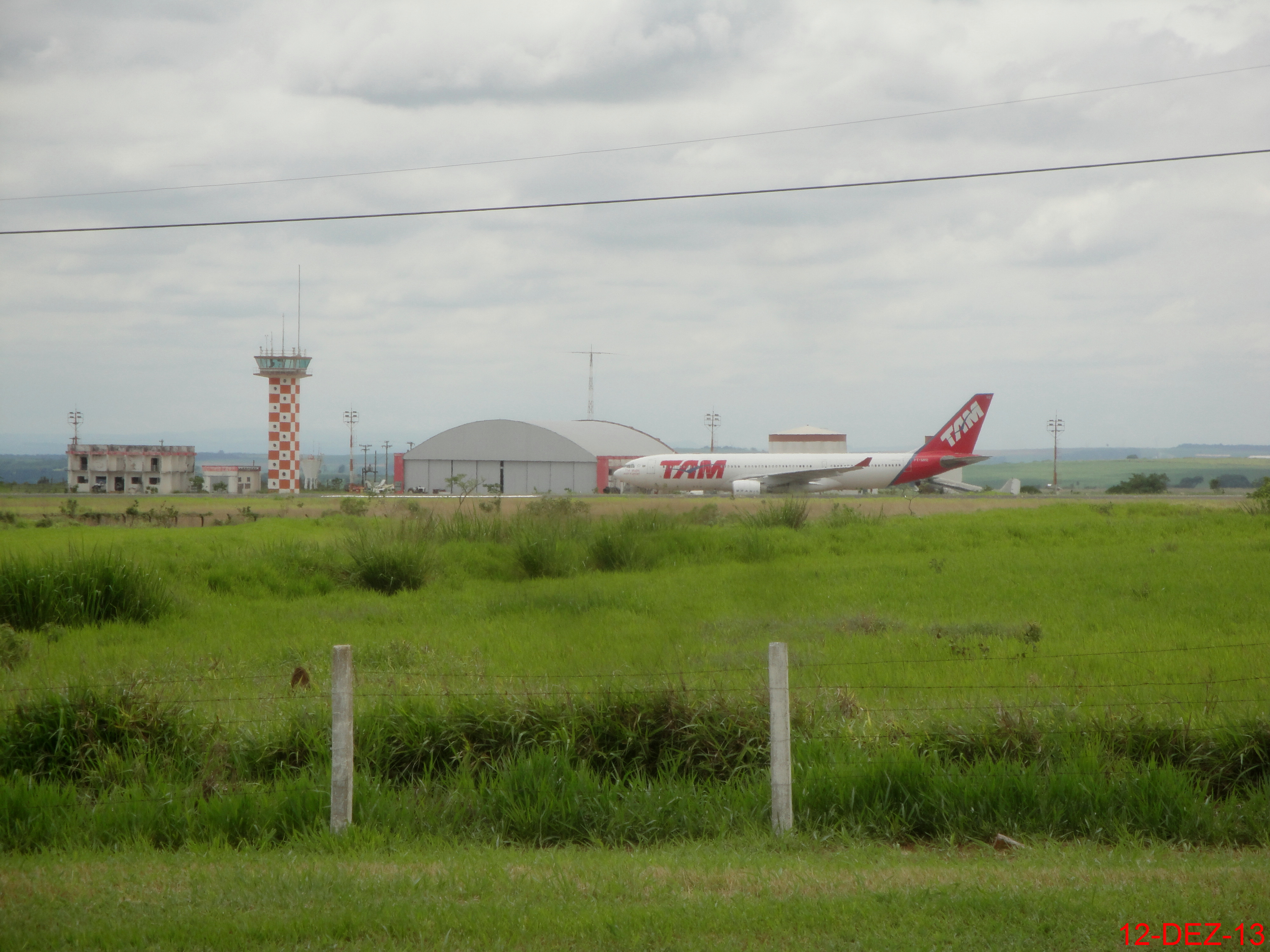
- IATA: QSC; ICAO: SDSC; LID: SP0029

Summary
- Airport type: Public
- Operator: DAESP (2001–2021); Rede Voa (2021–present)
- Serves: São Carlos
- Time zone: BRT (UTC−03:00)
- Elevation AMSL: 807 m (2,648 ft)
- Coordinates: 21°52′35″S 047°54′12″W
- Website: redevoa.com.br/nossos-aeroportos/aeroporto-mario-pereira-lopes-sao-carlos-sp/

Map
- Location in Brazil QSC (Brazil)

Runways
Direction	Length		Surface
Direction	m	ft	Surface
02/20	1,620	5,315	Asphalt

Statistics (2019)
- Passengers: 126 ▼70%
- Aircraft Operations: 1,056 ▼17%
- Statistics: DAESP; Sources: Airport Website, ANAC, DECEA

Mário Pereira Lopes State Airport (IATA: QSC, ICAO: SDSC) is the airport serving São Carlos, Brazil.

It is operated by Rede Voa.

== History ==
The airport was built in the 1970s as a private aerodrome of a Brazilian tractor manufacturer. In 1995 the factory went bankrupt and, as a consequence, its administration was taken over by DAESP in 2001. DAESP renovated and modernized all facilities.

On December 1, 1997, the facility was internationalized albeit with restrictions: only maintenance ferry flights are permitted with previous arrangements set with the National Civil Aviation Agency of Brazil.

Taking advantage of its international status TAM Airlines (now LATAM Brasil) acquired the old tractor plant and after a complete renovation installed one of its maintenance centers on the site. This facility provides services to not only LATAM but also other airlines.

In 2002, with the closure of the former São Carlos Airport (ICAO: SDZC), which was closer to town, the resident São Carlos Aero Club was transferred to Mário Pereira Lopes Airport.

Close to the maintenance center was located the TAM Museum which housed a big collection of vintage aircraft. On February 2, 2016, the museum was closed and on May 18, 2018, it was announced that it would be relocated close to the Brazilian Aerospace Memorial at São José dos Campos Airport, near the Embraer plant. However, this never happened. Eventually it was announced that the museum would reopen in May 2023 at its original location in São Carlos.

Previously operated by DAESP, on July 15, 2021, the concession of the airport was auctioned to Rede Voa.

== Access ==
The airport is located 14 km (9 mi) from downtown São Carlos.

== See also ==
- List of airports in Brazil
