= Santo Ângelo Airport =

Sepé Tiaraju Regional Airport Aeroporto Regional Sepé Tiaraju
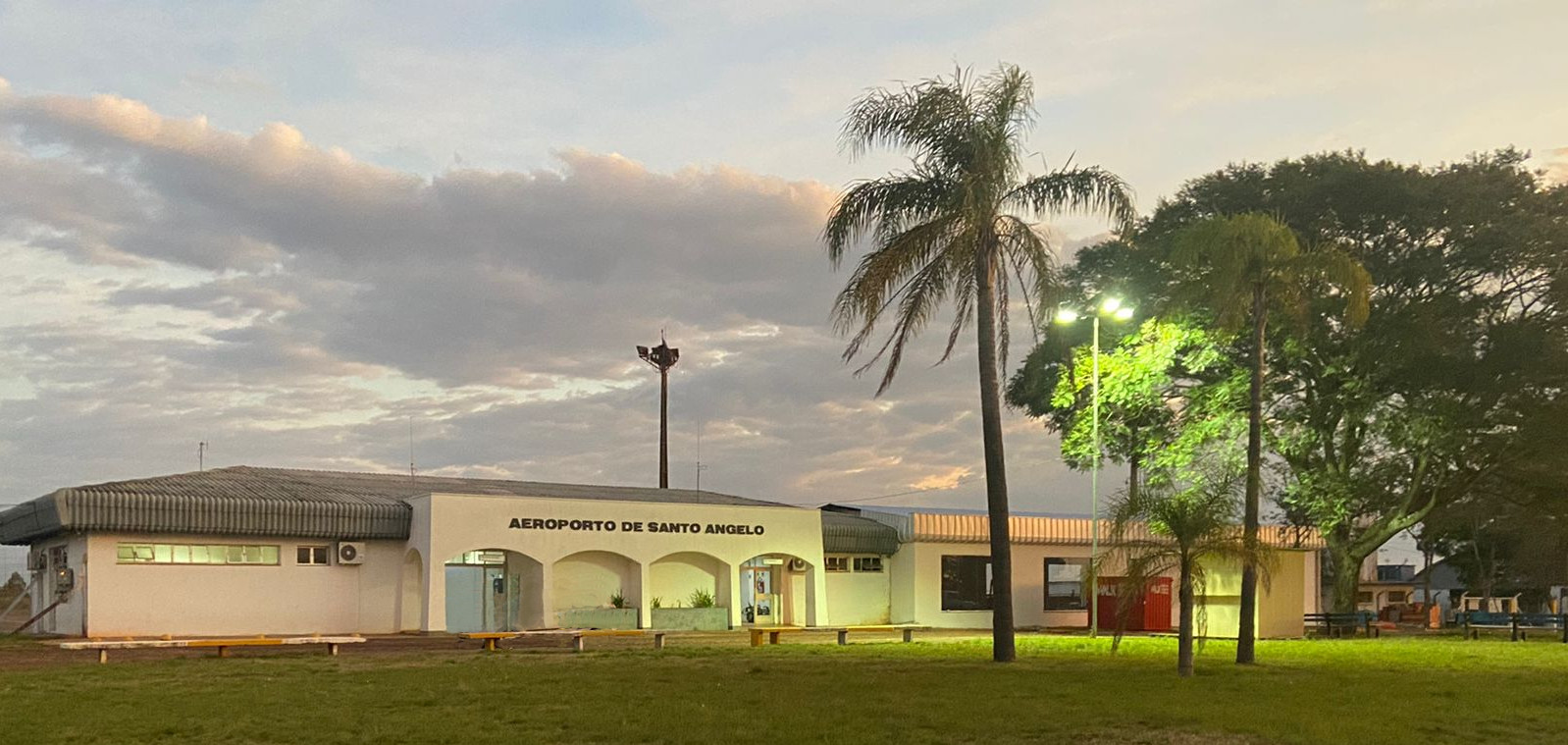
- Terminal landside view in 2022
- IATA: GEL; ICAO: SBNM; LID: RS0008

Summary
- Airport type: Public
- Operator: DAP (?–2022); Infraero (2022–2025); ON8 (2025–present)
- Serves: Santo Ângelo
- Time zone: BRT (UTC−03:00)
- Elevation AMSL: 322 m (1,056 ft)
- Coordinates: 28°16′54″S 054°10′06″W
- Website: aeroportosantoangelo.com.br

Map
- Location in Brazil GEL (Brazil)

Runways
Direction	Length		Surface
Direction	m	ft	Surface
12/30	1,625	5,331	Asphalt

Statistics (2025)
- Passengers: 61,158 ▼4%
- Aircraft Operations: 1,979 ▲10%
- Metric tonnes of cargo: 66 ▲14%
- Statistics: Infraero; Sources: Airport Website, ANAC, DECEA

Sepé Tiaraju Regional Airport (IATA: GEL, ICAO: SBNM) is the airport serving Santo Ângelo, Brazil. It is named after Sepé Tiaraju (c. 1723 – 7 February 1756), a Guaraní warrior who led the Guaraní forces in the Guaraní War in Misiones Orientales.

It is managed by ON8.

== History ==
On October 10, 2022 the State of Rio Grande do Sul signed a contract of operation with Infraero. Previously the airport was operated by DAP.

On September 26, 2025 ON8 (part of ECB Group) won a 30-year concession to operate the airport.

== Airlines and destinations ==
Airlines	Destinations
Azul Brazilian Airlines	Porto Alegre

== Access ==
The airport is located 8 km (5 mi) from downtown Santo Ângelo.

== See also ==
- List of airports in Brazil
