= Correia Pinto =

- Municipality
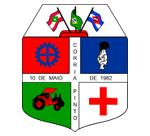
- Flag Coat of arms

- Location in Brazil
- Coordinates: 27°35′S 50°24′W
- Country: Brazil
- Region: South
- State: Santa Catarina
- Mesoregion: Serrana

Population (2020)
  - Total: 12,553
- Time zone: UTC -3

Correia Pinto is a municipality in the state of Santa Catarina in the South region of Brazil. It was created in 1982 out of the existing municipality of Lages.

The city is served by Planalto Serrano Regional Airport.

== See also ==
- List of municipalities in Santa Catarina
