= Concórdia Airport =

Olavo Cecco Rigon Airport Aeroporto Olavo Cecco Rigon
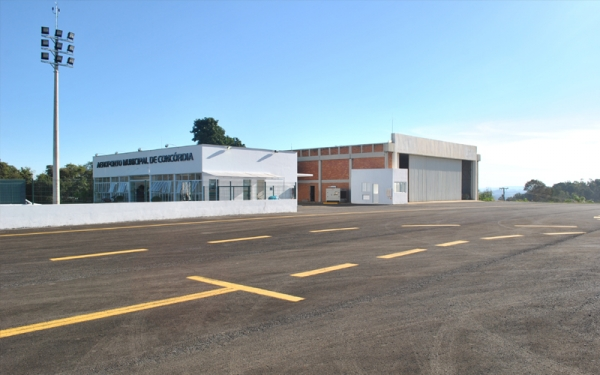
- IATA: CCI; ICAO: SSCK; LID: SC0010

Summary
- Airport type: Public
- Serves: Concórdia
- Time zone: BRT (UTC−03:00)
- Elevation AMSL: 751 m (2,464 ft)
- Coordinates: 27°10′50″S 52°03′04″W

Map
- Location in Brazil

Runways
Direction	Length		Surface
Direction	m	ft	Surface
15/33	1,480	4,856	Asphalt
- Sources: ANAC, DECEA

Olavo Cecco Rigon Airport (IATA: CCI, ICAO: SSCK) is the airport serving Concórdia, Brazil.

== History ==
The runway sits atop a ridge with dropoffs on all sides. The terrain in all quadrants is hilly, with ridges and ravines.

The Chapecó VOR-DME (Ident: XPC) is located 32.7 nautical miles (61 km) west of the airport.

The airport underwent major renovation in 2013.

== Accidents and incidents ==
- 6 September 1961: Real Transportes Aéreos, a Douglas C-47-DL registration PP-AVL belonging to Aerovias Brasil, while on visual approach under adverse conditions to Concórdia crashed into a hill 1,500m short of the runway. Three crew members died.

== Access ==
The airport is located 6 km (4 mi) north from downtown Concórdia.

== See also ==
- List of airports in Brazil
