= Caxias do Sul Airport =

Airport in Brazil

Hugo Cantergiani Regional Airport Aeroporto Regional Hugo Cantergiani
- IATA: CXJ; ICAO: SBCX; LID: RS0007

Summary
- Airport type: Public
- Operator: DAP (?–2022); Caxias do Sul (2022–2026); Infraero (2026–present)
- Serves: Caxias do Sul
- Time zone: BRT (UTC−03:00)
- Elevation AMSL: 754 m (2,474 ft)
- Coordinates: 29°11′53″S 051°11′12″W

Map
- Location in Brazil CXJ (Brazil)

Runways
Direction	Length		Surface
Direction	m	ft	Surface
15/33	1,670	5,479	Asphalt
- Sources: ANAC, DECEA

Hugo Cantergiani Regional Airport (IATA: CXJ, ICAO: SBCX), formerly called Campo dos Bugres Airport, is the airport serving Caxias do Sul, Brazil.

It is operated is managed by Infraero.

== History ==
Commissioned in March 1941, Caxias do Sul Airport has followed the evolution of aeronautics in the last eight decades. In addition to the runway, previously located in the current "Cinquentenário" neighborhood, the Caxias do Sul Aeroclube appeared in February of that year, with the objective of training pilots. The ceremony was attended by journalist Assis Chateaubriand, who launched the National Aviation Campaign, a project that provided tools for aviation schools.

According to researcher Roberto Grazziotin, the airport moved to "Salgado Filho" neighborhood in 1954.

In 1972, with the intention of welcoming President Médici, a 1,500-meter runway was paved. However, the strong momentum was triggered in 1987, when the airport improved and the State began the work of installing instruments and expanding the landing / takeoff runway from 1500 m to 2000 m, as well as the passenger terminal for the installation of the line. between Caxias / São Paulo.

Previously operated by DAP with participation of the Municipality of Caxias do Sul, on August 26, 2022 the concession of the facility was transferred entirely to the Municipality. On October 9, 2026 the concessionary changed once again, this time to Infraero.

== Airlines and destinations ==
Airlines	Destinations
Azul Brazilian Airlines	Campinas
Gol Linhas Aéreas	São Paulo–Congonhas, São Paulo–Guarulhos
LATAM Brasil	São Paulo–Congonhas, São Paulo–Guarulhos

== Access ==
The airport is located 8 km (5 mi) from downtown Caxias do Sul.

== See also ==
- List of airports in Brazil
