= Garanhuns Airport =

Garanhuns Airport Aeroporto de Garanhuns
- IATA: QGP; ICAO: SNGN; LID: PE0006

Summary
- Airport type: Public
- Operator: GRU Airport (2025–Present)
- Serves: Garanhuns
- Time zone: BRT (UTC−03:00)
- Elevation AMSL: 759 m (2,490 ft)
- Coordinates: 08°50′04″S 36°28′17″W

Map
- Location in Brazil

Runways
Direction	Length		Surface
Direction	m	ft	Surface
16/34	1,259	4,131	Asphalt
- Sources: ANAC, DECEA

Garanhuns Airport (IATA: QGP, ICAO: SNGN) is the airport serving Garanhuns, Brazil.

It is managed by GRU Airport.

== History ==
On November 27, 2025, GRU Airport won the concession to operate the airport.

== Airlines and destinations ==
Airlines	Destinations
Azul Conecta	Recife

== Access ==
The airport is located 7 km (4 mi) from downtown Garanhuns.

== See also ==
- List of airports in Brazil
