= Ijuí =

Municipality of Rio Grande do Sul, Brazil

- Municipality
- O Município de Ijuí; The Municipality of Ijuí
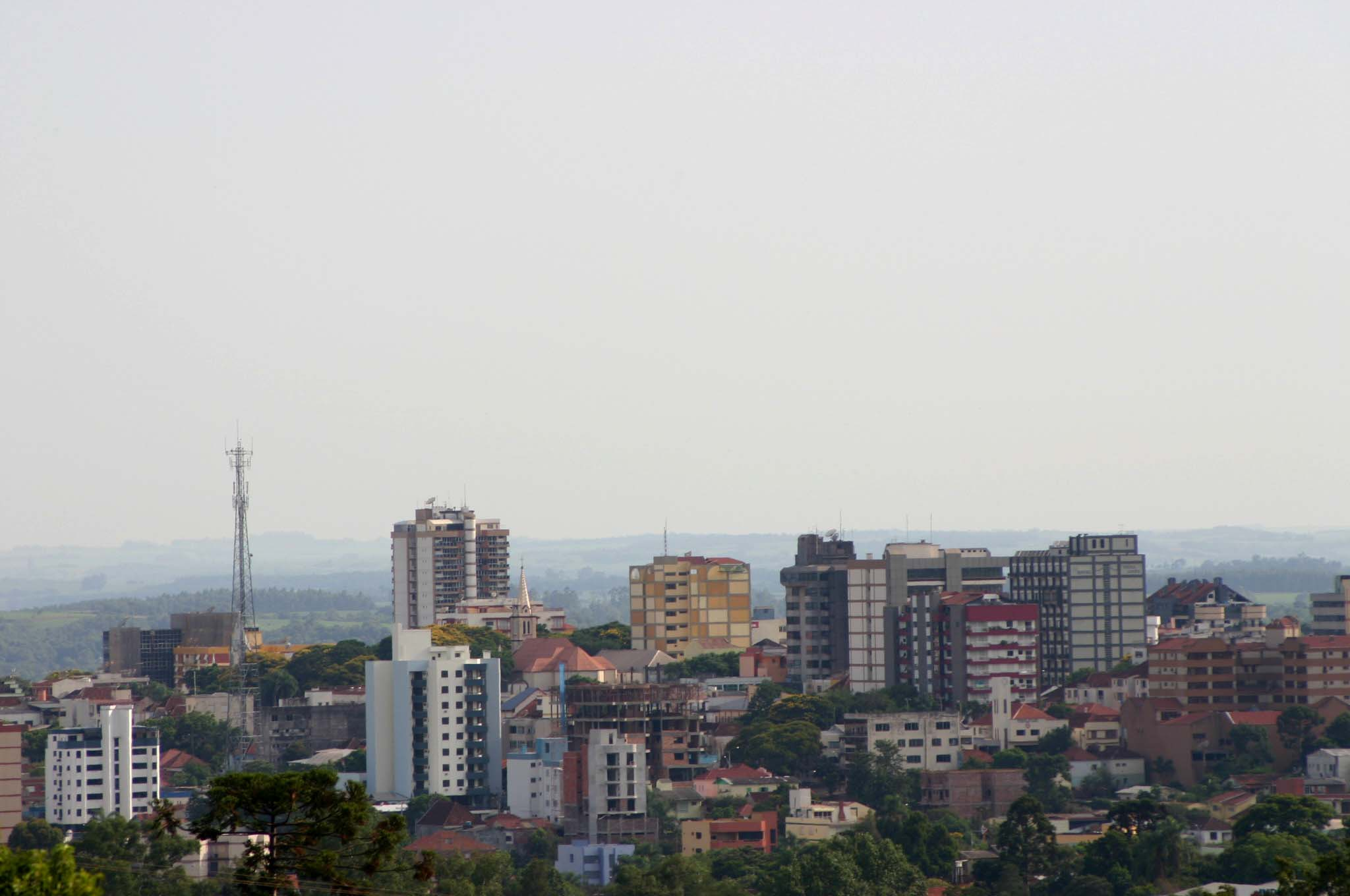
- Partial view of the city's skyline

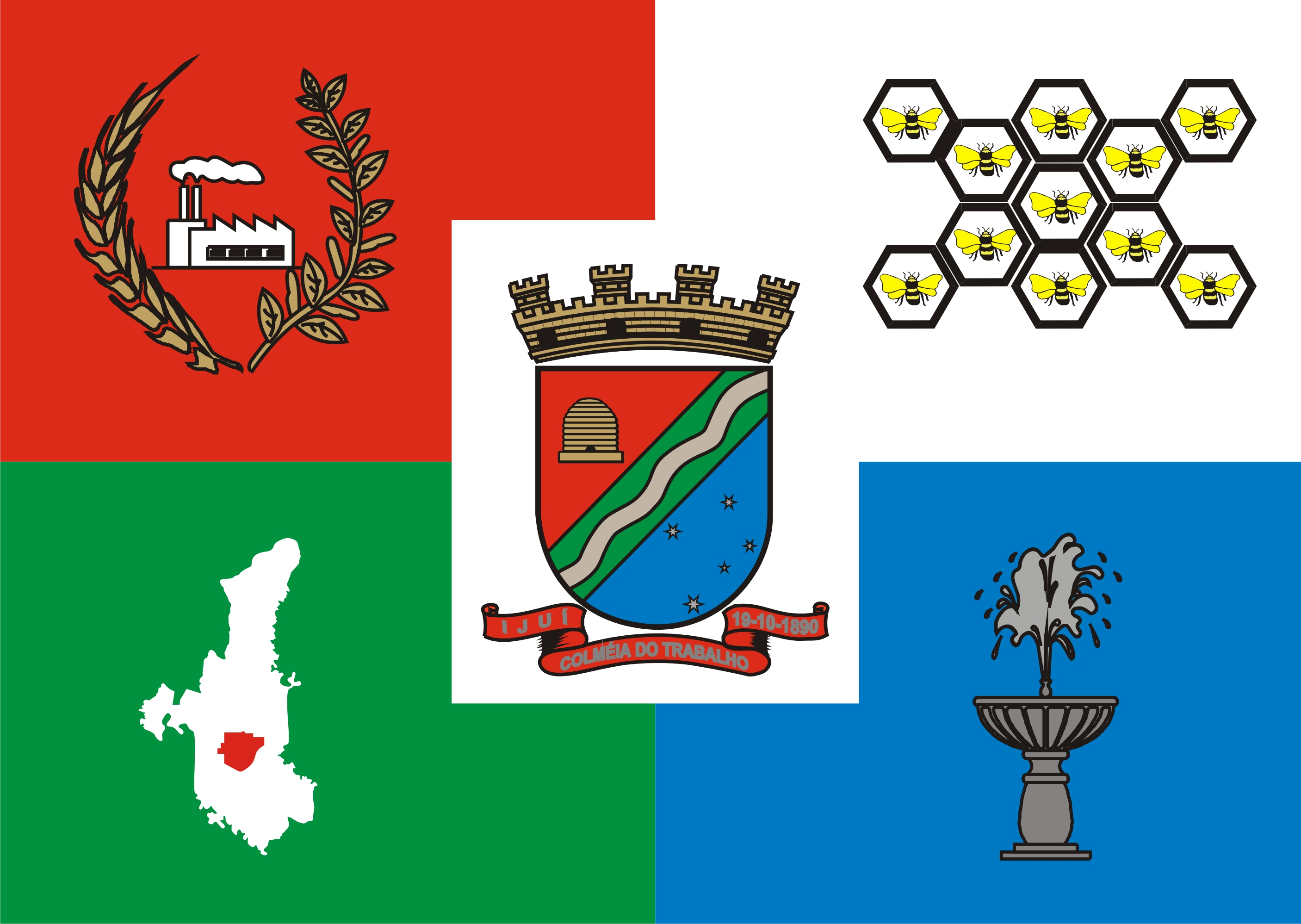
- Flag Coat of arms
- Nicknames: "Terra das Culturas Diversificadas" "Portal das Missões" "Capital da Cultura" "Colméia do Trabalho"

- Location in Brazil
- Coordinates: 28°23′16″S 53°54′54″W
- Country: Brazil
- State: Rio Grande do Sul
- Mesoregion: Mesorregião do Noroeste Rio-Grandense
- Microregion: Microrregião de Ijuí
- Founded: October 19, 1890

Government
  - Mayor: Andrei Cossetin Sczmanski (PP)

Area
  - Total: 689.12 km^{2} (266.07 sq mi)
- Elevation: 328 m (1,076 ft)

Population (2020)
  - Total: 83,764
  - Density: 121.55/km^{2} (314.82/sq mi)
- Demonym: Ijuiense
- Time zone: UTC-3 (UTC−3)
  - Summer (DST): UTC-2 (UTC−2)
- Postal Code: 98700-000
- Area code: +55 55
- Website: http://www.ijui.rs.gov.br/

Ijuí (Portuguese pronunciation: [iʒu'i]) is a Brazilian municipality of Rio Grande do Sul, situated 395 kilometres (245 mi) from the state capital, Porto Alegre. In 2020 its population was 83,764, making it the third most populous city of the Missões region, behind Passo Fundo and Erechim.

== Demographics ==
The town is known as "The Land of Diversified Cultures", and since 2021 was recognized as the "Ethnic National Capital" due to the various nationalities of its founding immigrants, notably from Italy, Germany, Austria, Netherlands, Sweden, Poland, Latvia, and others.

The city hosts biannually the folk fest Expofest Ijuí typically in October.

Ijuí has a variable daily population of approximately 100,000 people, being an important regional centre.

== Infrastructure ==
Ijuí is a university town with major health services, containing one of the best hospitals away from the state capital, the Ijuí Charity Hospital (Portuguese: Hospital de Caridade de Ijuí).

The city is served by João Batista Bos Filho Airport.

== Sport ==
EC São Luiz is the local professional football team.

== Notable people ==
- Dunga - Former coach of the Brazil National Football Team and former player
- Krisiun - Death Metal band
- Felipe Mattioni Rohde - Football player of Espanyol
- Paulo César Baier - Football player
- Alexandre Hocevar - tennis player
- Marcos Hocevar - tennis player
- Andressa Urach - model

== See also ==
- List of municipalities in Rio Grande do Sul
