= São Miguel do Oeste =

- Municipality
- Municipality of São Miguel do Oeste
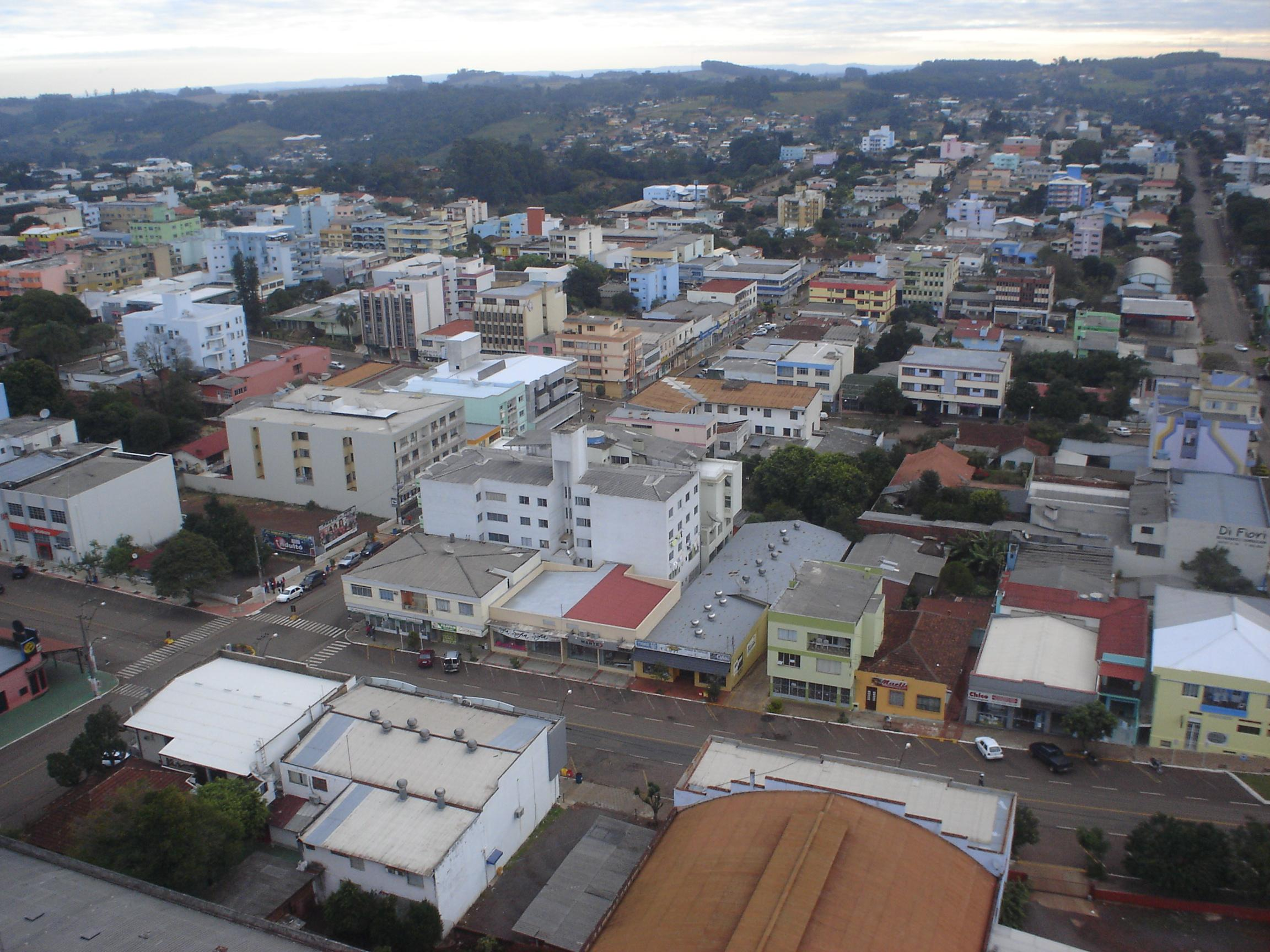
- Church "São Miguel Arcanjo"

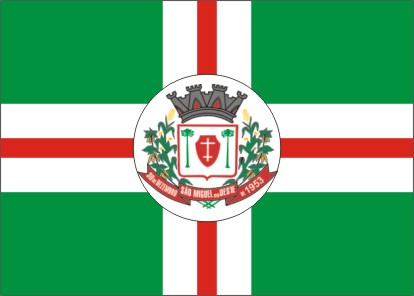
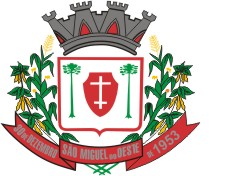
- Flag Coat of arms
- Nickname: "São Miguel"
- Location of São Miguel do Oeste
- Coordinates: 26°43′51″S 53°30′55″W
- Country: Brazil
- Region: South
- State: Santa Catarina
- Founded: February 15, 1954

Government
  - Mayor: Wilson Trevisan (PSD)

Area
  - Total: 234.202 km^{2} (90.426 sq mi)
- Elevation: 720 m (2,360 ft)

Population (2022)
  - Total: 44,330
  - Density: 189.3/km^{2} (490/sq mi)
- Time zone: UTC-3 (UTC-3)
  - Summer (DST): UTC-2 (UTC-2)
- CEP: 89900-000
- HDI (2010): 0.801 – high

São Miguel do Oeste is a Brazilian municipality in the state of Santa Catarina, in the southern region of Brazil, 655 km from the state capital, Florianópolis. Its population in 2022, according to the Brazilian Institute of Geography and Statistics Demographic Census, was 44 330 inhabitants.

Considered the capital of the extreme west of Santa Catarina, it is the largest city in the state of Santa Catarina close to the border with Argentina, polarizing important health, security and education bodies and institutions. It is widely used as a stopping point for Argentine, Paraguayan and Chilean tourists visiting the beaches of Santa Catarina or by Brazilians on their way to the Iguazu Falls.

The city was founded on 15 February 1954 by immigrants from the Brazilian state of Rio Grande do Sul, descendants of Italian and German. The name of the city is a blend of its patron saint, São Miguel Arcanjo, and the name of the district that led the city, West Village (Vila Oeste).

The city is served by Miguel Wasum Airport.

== Notable people ==
- Vini (born 1984), Italian Brazilian footballer

== Climate ==
Climate data for São Miguel do Oeste, elevation 700 m (2,300 ft), (1976–2005)
Month	Jan	Feb	Mar	Apr	May	Jun	Jul	Aug	Sep	Oct	Nov	Dec	Year
Record high °C (°F)	36.0 (96.8)	33.2 (91.8)	34.0 (93.2)	32.2 (90.0)	29.8 (85.6)	27.8 (82.0)	29.0 (84.2)	33.2 (91.8)	34.4 (93.9)	33.6 (92.5)	35.0 (95.0)	34.6 (94.3)	36.0 (96.8)
Mean daily maximum °C (°F)	28.6 (83.5)	27.7 (81.9)	26.9 (80.4)	24.3 (75.7)	20.9 (69.6)	19.1 (66.4)	19.0 (66.2)	21.8 (71.2)	22.2 (72.0)	24.6 (76.3)	26.8 (80.2)	28.4 (83.1)	24.2 (75.5)
Daily mean °C (°F)	23.5 (74.3)	22.8 (73.0)	21.9 (71.4)	19.4 (66.9)	16.3 (61.3)	14.6 (58.3)	14.2 (57.6)	16.8 (62.2)	17.3 (63.1)	19.6 (67.3)	21.5 (70.7)	23.4 (74.1)	19.3 (66.7)
Mean daily minimum °C (°F)	19.4 (66.9)	18.9 (66.0)	18.0 (64.4)	15.7 (60.3)	12.7 (54.9)	11.2 (52.2)	10.3 (50.5)	12.5 (54.5)	13.2 (55.8)	15.4 (59.7)	16.8 (62.2)	19.0 (66.2)	15.3 (59.5)
Record low °C (°F)	11.0 (51.8)	10.6 (51.1)	7.4 (45.3)	2.2 (36.0)	4.0 (39.2)	2.0 (35.6)	−3.0 (26.6)	−3.0 (26.6)	2.0 (35.6)	2.0 (35.6)	5.2 (41.4)	10.4 (50.7)	−3.0 (26.6)
Average precipitation mm (inches)	168.0 (6.61)	154.0 (6.06)	146.0 (5.75)	132.0 (5.20)	145.0 (5.71)	145.0 (5.71)	128.0 (5.04)	101.0 (3.98)	173.0 (6.81)	219.0 (8.62)	156.0 (6.14)	170.0 (6.69)	1,837 (72.32)
Average relative humidity (%)	75	79	78	79	78	80	74	70	72	74	69	70	75
Mean monthly sunshine hours	216	188	200	174	165	130	160	170	151	167	210	190	2,121
Source 1: Empresa Brasileira de Pesquisa Agropecuária (EMBRAPA)
Source 2: Climatempo (precipitation)
