= Santa Rosa Airport (Brazil) =

Luís Alberto Lehr Airport Aeroporto Luís Alberto Lehr
- IATA: SRA; ICAO: SSZR; LID: RS0027

Summary
- Airport type: Public
- Operator: DAP
- Serves: Santa Rosa
- Opened: December 8, 1957
- Time zone: BRT (UTC−03:00)
- Elevation AMSL: 309 m (1,014 ft)
- Coordinates: 27°54′32″S 054°31′20″W

Map
- Location in Brazil SRA (Brazil)

Runways
Direction	Length		Surface
Direction	m	ft	Surface
07/25	1,200	3,937	Asphalt
- Sources: ANAC, DECEA

Luís Alberto Lehr Airport (IATA: SRA, ICAO: SSZR) is the airport serving Santa Rosa, Brazil.

It is operated by DAP.

== History ==
The airport was commissioned on December 8, 1957.

== Access ==
The airport is located 6 km (4 mi) southwest from downtown Santa Rosa.

== See also ==
- List of airports in Brazil
