= Erechim Airport =

Erechim Airport Aeroporto de Erechim
- IATA: ERM; ICAO: SSER; LID: RS0018

Summary
- Airport type: Public
- Operator: DAP
- Serves: Erechim
- Time zone: BRT (UTC−03:00)
- Elevation AMSL: 761 m (2,497 ft)
- Coordinates: 27°39′48″S 052°16′19″W

Map
- Location in Brazil ERM (Brazil)

Runways
Direction	Length		Surface
Direction	m	ft	Surface
14/32	1,280	4,199	Asphalt
- Sources: ANAC, DECEA

Erechim Airport (IATA: ERM, ICAO: SSER) is the airport serving Erechim, Brazil.

It is operated by DAP.

== History ==
In 2010, the entire airport complex received major investments, including renovation of the runway and of the terminal building.

== Access ==
The airport is located 2 km (1 mi) from downtown Erechim.

== See also ==
- List of airports in Brazil
