= Rio Grande Airport =

Airport in Brazil

Rio Grande Regional Airport Aeroporto Regional de Rio Grande
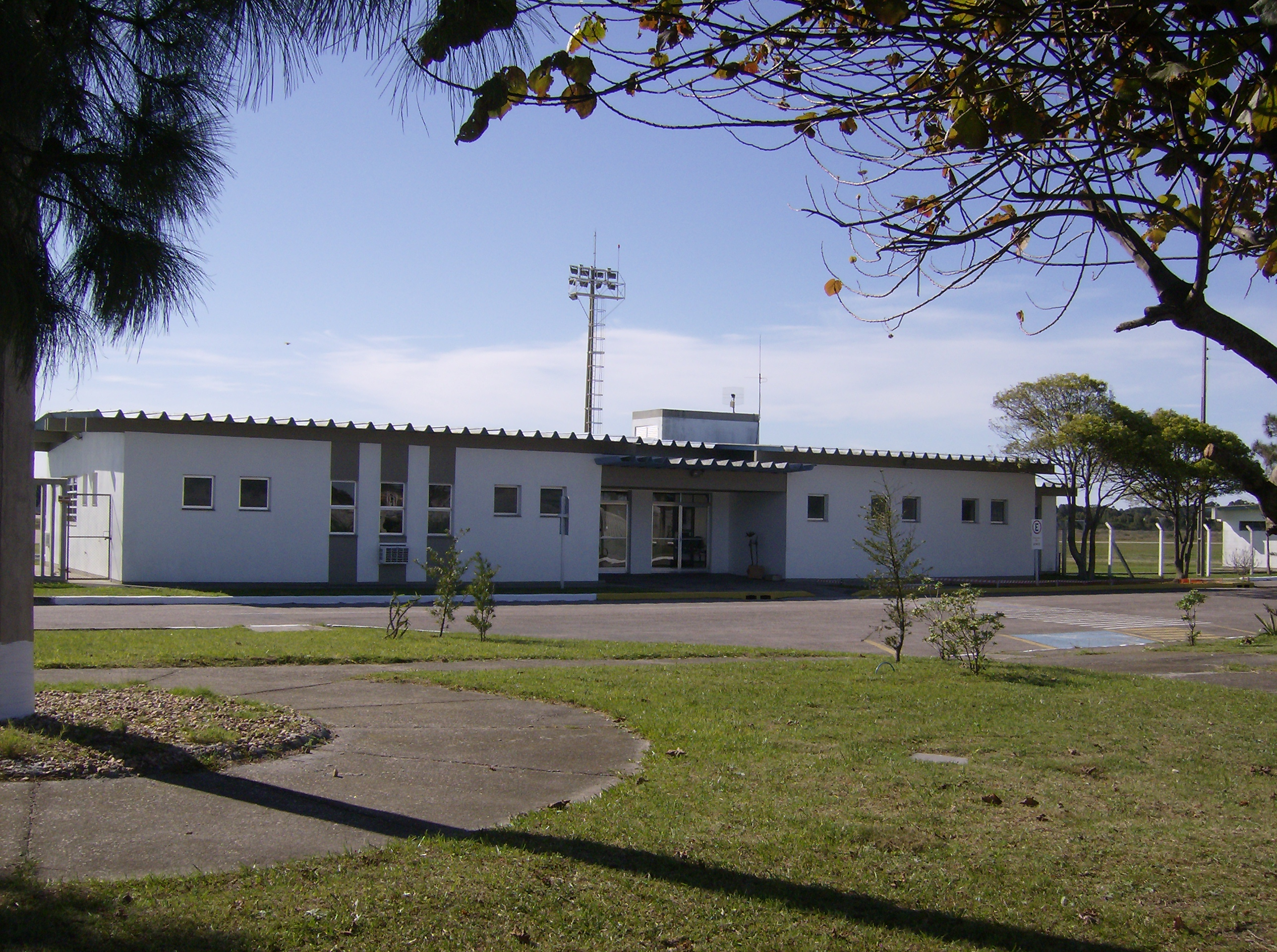
- IATA: RIG; ICAO: SJRG; LID: RS0013

Summary
- Airport type: Public
- Operator: DAP
- Serves: Rio Grande
- Time zone: BRT (UTC−03:00)
- Elevation AMSL: 6 m (20 ft)
- Coordinates: 32°05′01″S 052°10′04″W

Map
- Location in Brazil RIG (Brazil)

Runways
Direction	Length		Surface
Direction	m	ft	Surface
06/24	1,900	6,234	Asphalt
- Sources: ANAC, DECEA

Rio Grande Regional Airport (IATA: RIG, ICAO: SJRG), formerly SBRG, also known as Gustavo Cramer Airport, is the airport serving Rio Grande, Brazil.

It is operated by DAP.

== Access ==
The airport is located 9 km (6 mi) from downtown Rio Grande.

== See also ==
- List of airports in Brazil
