= Concórdia =

- Municipality
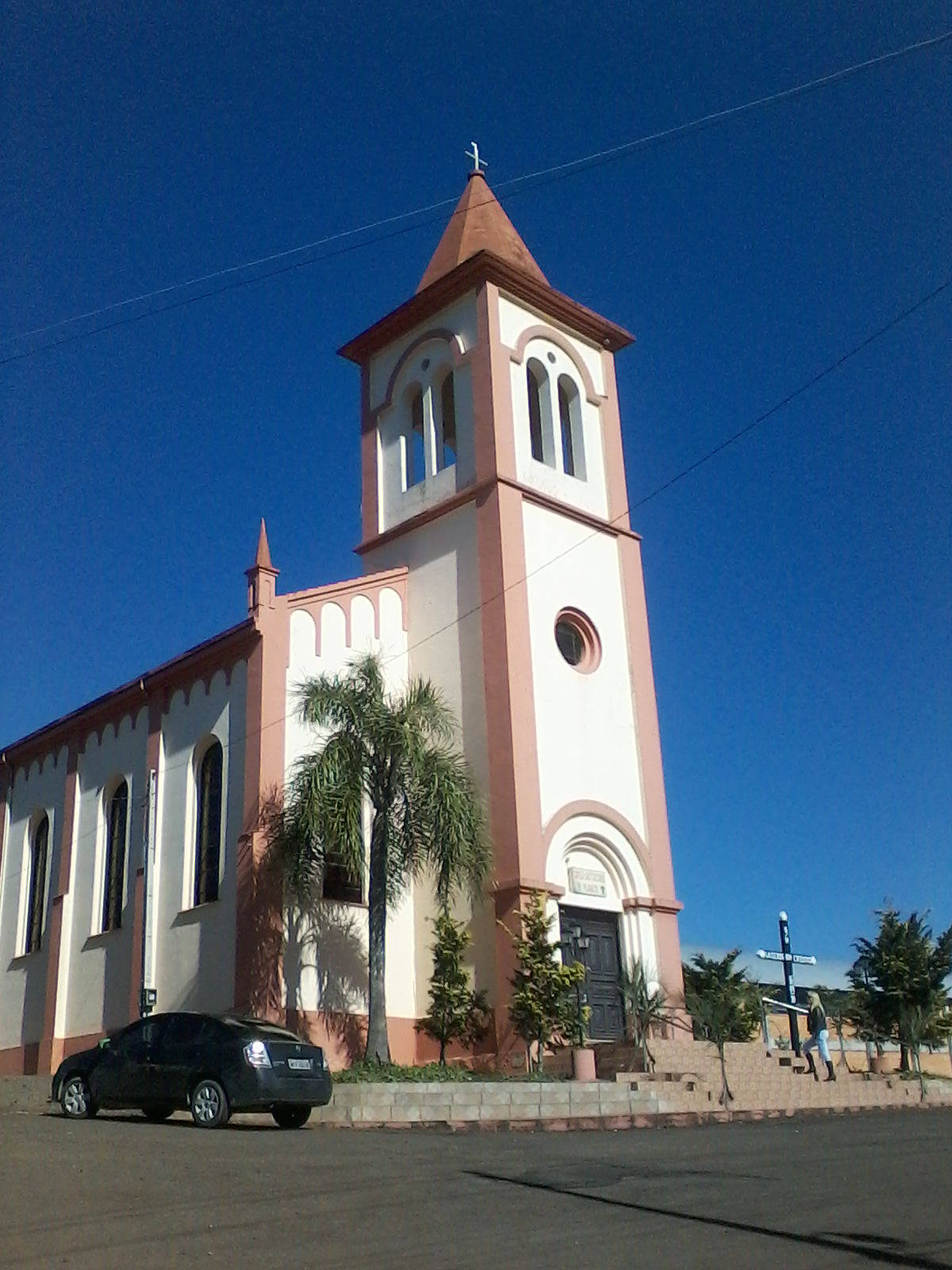

- Flag Coat of arms

- Location in Santa Catarina state

- Location in Brazil
- Coordinates: 27°14′02″S 52°01′40″W
- Country: Brazil
- Region: South
- State: Santa Catarina
- Mesoregion: Oeste Catarinense
- Microregion: Concórdia

Government
  - Mayor: Rogério Luciano Pacheco (PSDB)

Area
  - Total: 799.88 km^{2} (308.84 sq mi)
- Elevation: 550 m (1,800 ft)

Population (2020)
  - Total: 75,167
  - Density: 93.973/km^{2} (243.39/sq mi)
- Time zone: UTC-03:00 (BRT)
  - Summer (DST): UTC-02:00 (BRST)
- Website: www.concordia.sc.gov.br

Concórdia is a city in the Brazilian state of Santa Catarina. It was founded by colonizers of the State of Rio Grande do Sul, basically descendants of Italians and Germans, who immigrated to Brazil in the 19th century. It is located 480 km west of Florianópolis. The population is 75,167 (2020 est.) in an area of 799.88 km².

The city is served by Olavo Cecco Rigon Airport.

The municipality contains the 741 hectares (1,830 acres) Fritz Plaumann State Park, created in 2003.

The city is also founding place to Sadia, one of the largest meat manufacturers in Brazil, as well as Coopercarga, a large cargo transportation company.
