= Arealva =

Municipality in the state of São Paulo in Brazil

- Municipality
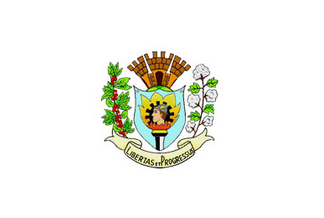
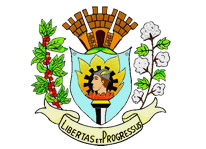
- Flag Coat of arms

- Location in São Paulo state

- Location in Brazil
- Coordinates: 22°1′43″S 48°54′40″W
- Country: Brazil
- Region: Southeast
- State: São Paulo

Area
  - Total: 505 km^{2} (195 sq mi)

Population (2020)
  - Total: 8,613
  - Density: 17.1/km^{2} (44.2/sq mi)
- Time zone: UTC−3 (BRT)

Arealva is a city in the state of São Paulo in Brazil. The population is 8,613 (2020 est.) in an area of 505 km^{2}. The elevation is 445 m.

The Bauru-Arealva Airport (official name Moussa Nakhl Tobias State Airport) located at Arealva also serves the adjoining city of Bauru.

== History ==
The municipality was created by state law in 1948.

Map of the state of São Paulo (1948).

== Demographics ==
Historical population (municipality)
Year	Population	%±
1950	8,201	—
1960	7,681	−6.3%
1970	6,519	−15.1%
1980	6,788	4.1%
1991	6,892	1.5%
2000	7,244	5.1%
2010	7,841	8.2%
2022	8,130	3.7%

== Media ==
In telecommunications, the city was served by Companhia de Telecomunicações do Estado de São Paulo until 1973, when it began to be served by Telecomunicações de São Paulo. In July 1998, this company was acquired by Telefónica, which adopted the Vivo brand in 2012.

The company is currently an operator of cell phones, fixed lines, internet (fiber optics/4G) and television (satellite and cable).

== See also ==
- List of municipalities in São Paulo
