= Lauro Kurtz Airport =

Airport in Rio Grande do Sul, Brazil

Lauro Kurtz Airport Aeroporto Lauro Kurtz
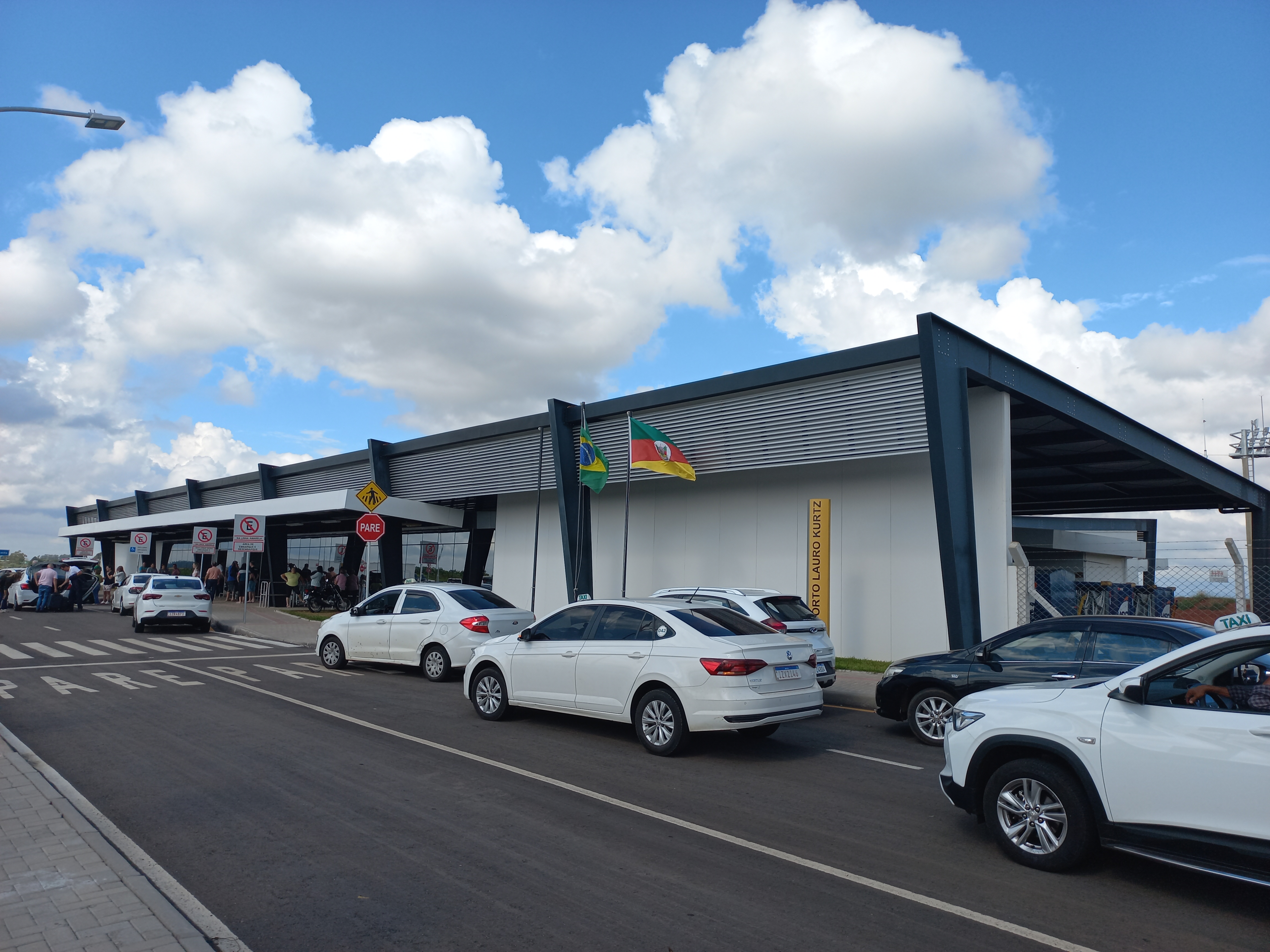
- Terminal landside view in 2023
- IATA: PFB; ICAO: SBPF; LID: RS0006

Summary
- Airport type: Public
- Operator: DAP (?–2022); Infraero (2022–2025); ON8 (2025–present)
- Serves: Passo Fundo
- Time zone: BRT (UTC−03:00)
- Elevation AMSL: 725 m (2,379 ft)
- Coordinates: 28°14′39″S 052°19′42″W
- Website: aeroportopassofundo.com.br

Map
- Location in Brazil PFB (Brazil)

Runways
Direction	Length		Surface
Direction	m	ft	Surface
09/27	1,680	5,512	Asphalt

Statistics (2025)
- Passengers: 247,873 ▼13%
- Aircraft Operations: 4,490 ▼13%
- Metric tonnes of cargo: 623 ▲20%
- Statistics: Infraero; Sources: Airport Website, ANAC, DECEA

Lauro Kurtz Airport (IATA: PFB, ICAO: SBPF) is the airport serving Passo Fundo, Brazil. Since June 5, 1959 it is named after Lauro Ignacio Kurtz (1917-1949), sometimes also written Kortz, a pilot of the airline SAVAG, killed on an air-crash in 1949.

It is managed by ON8.

== History ==
The airport was renovated in 2007. In January 2021 the airport was closed for the renovation of the runway and construction of a new terminal. It was re-opened on April 8, 2022.

On April 4, 2022, the State of Rio Grande do Sul signed a contract of operation with Infraero. Previously the airport was operated by DAP.

On September 26, 2025 ON8 (part of ECB Group) won a 30-year concession to operate the airport.

== Airlines and destinations ==
Airlines	Destinations
Azul Brazilian Airlines	Campinas
Gol Linhas Aéreas	São Paulo–Guarulhos
LATAM Brasil	São Paulo–Guarulhos

== Accidents and incidents ==
- 1 July 1963: a Varig Douglas C-47B-20-DK registration PP-VBV flying from Porto Alegre and Carazinho to Passo Fundo collided with trees on high ground and crashed shortly before arriving in Passo Fundo. Of the 18 passengers and crew aboard, 15 died.

== Access ==
The airport is located 13 km (8 mi) from downtown Passo Fundo.

== See also ==
- List of airports in Brazil
