= Santa Rosa, Rio Grande do Sul =

Municipality in Rio Grande do Sul, Brazil

Coordinates: 27.867°S 54.467°W

Santa Rosa
- Municipality
- Municipality of Santa Rosa
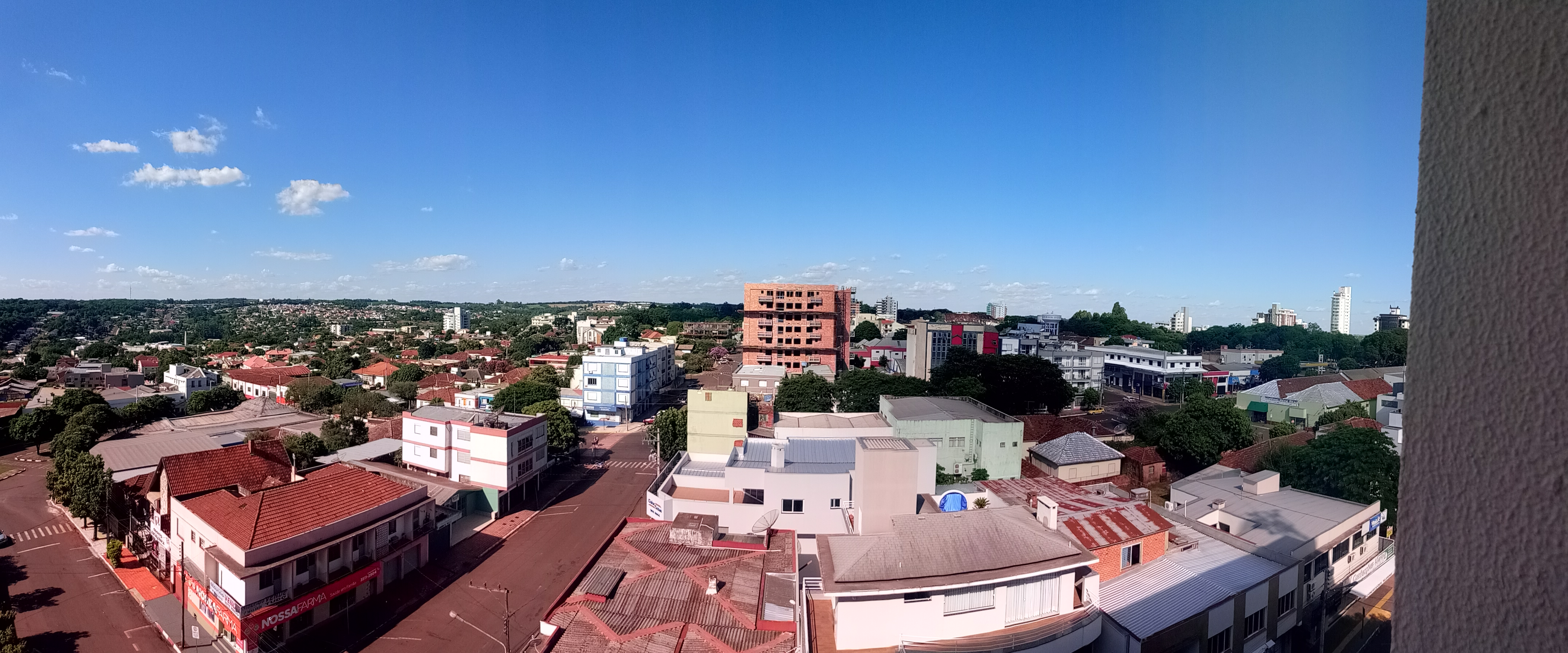

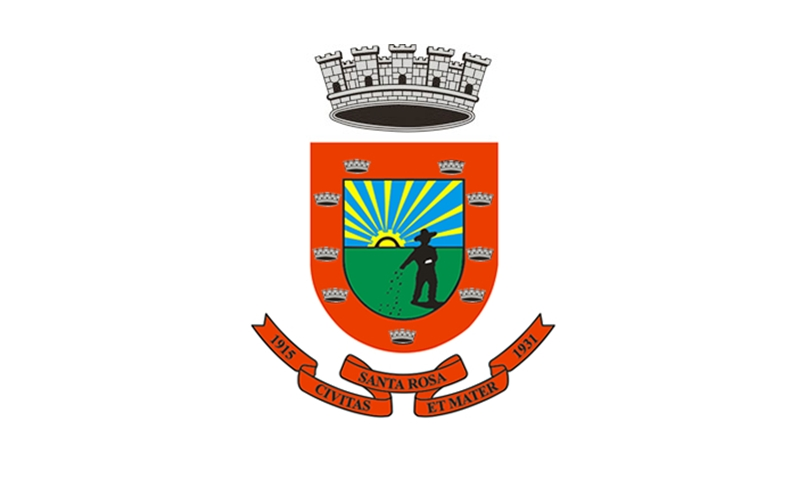
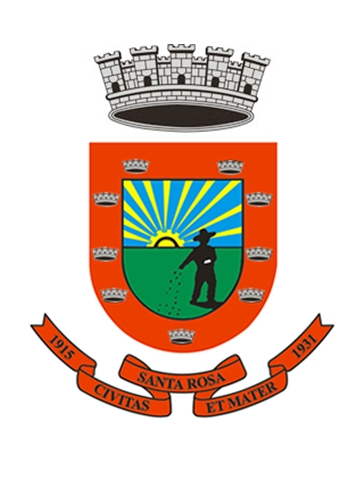
- Flag Coat of arms

- Location in Rio Grande do Sul
- Country: Brazil
- State: Rio Grande do Sul
- Region: South
- Founded: 10 August 1931

Government
  - Mayor: Anderson Mantei (PP)

Area
  - Total: 489.798 km^{2} (189.112 sq mi)
- Elevation: 277 m (909 ft)

Population (2022)
  - Total: 77,519
  - Density: 158.27/km^{2} (409.91/sq mi)
- Demonym: santa-rosense
- Time zone: UTC−3 (BRT)
- Postal Code: 98780-001 to 98798-970
- HDI (2010): 0.769 – high
- Website: santarosa.rs.gov.br

Santa Rosa is a municipality in the Brazilian state of Rio Grande do Sul, located at latitude 27º52'15" and longitude 54º28'53" at a height of 277 meters above sea level. It has an area of 488.42 km^{2}. Its estimated population is 73,575 (2020). It is known as the "National Cradle of Soybeans".

== History ==
Santa Rosa was created as a colony of European immigrants in 1915, mainly Italians, Germans and Russians. The German dialect traditionally spoken in the region is Riograndenser Hunsrückisch.

== Geography ==
=== Climate ===
Climate data for Santa Rosa, Rio Grande do Sul, elevation 330 m (1,080 ft), (1976–2005)
Month	Jan	Feb	Mar	Apr	May	Jun	Jul	Aug	Sep	Oct	Nov	Dec	Year
Record high °C (°F)	35.8 (96.4)	34.5 (94.1)	33.5 (92.3)	32.5 (90.5)	29.2 (84.6)	27.5 (81.5)	27.7 (81.9)	30.7 (87.3)	32.2 (90.0)	34.3 (93.7)	35.2 (95.4)	36.0 (96.8)	36.0 (96.8)
Mean daily maximum °C (°F)	31.3 (88.3)	30.3 (86.5)	29.2 (84.6)	26.2 (79.2)	22.6 (72.7)	20.1 (68.2)	20.2 (68.4)	22.4 (72.3)	23.5 (74.3)	26.9 (80.4)	29.1 (84.4)	31.3 (88.3)	26.1 (79.0)
Daily mean °C (°F)	25.8 (78.4)	25.0 (77.0)	23.8 (74.8)	21.0 (69.8)	17.7 (63.9)	15.5 (59.9)	15.4 (59.7)	17.2 (63.0)	18.1 (64.6)	21.3 (70.3)	23.3 (73.9)	25.4 (77.7)	20.8 (69.4)
Mean daily minimum °C (°F)	20.2 (68.4)	19.7 (67.5)	18.5 (65.3)	15.9 (60.6)	12.7 (54.9)	10.9 (51.6)	10.6 (51.1)	12.0 (53.6)	12.8 (55.0)	15.7 (60.3)	17.6 (63.7)	19.6 (67.3)	15.5 (59.9)
Record low °C (°F)	14.3 (57.7)	14.4 (57.9)	12.4 (54.3)	8.2 (46.8)	4.6 (40.3)	2.0 (35.6)	1.8 (35.2)	3.2 (37.8)	4.3 (39.7)	8.3 (46.9)	10.6 (51.1)	13.6 (56.5)	1.8 (35.2)
Average precipitation mm (inches)	142.0 (5.59)	146.0 (5.75)	122.3 (4.81)	159.5 (6.28)	147.3 (5.80)	146.0 (5.75)	115.7 (4.56)	111.9 (4.41)	152.2 (5.99)	202.8 (7.98)	144.3 (5.68)	135.1 (5.32)	1,725.1 (67.92)
Average relative humidity (%)	76	78	80	81	75	81	75	73	75	68	65	71	75
Mean monthly sunshine hours	236	213	219	177	168	142	165	174	175	205	220	246	2,340
Source: Empresa Brasileira de Pesquisa Agropecuária (EMBRAPA)

== Transportation ==
The city is served by Luís Alberto Lehr Airport.

== Events ==
- Soybean National Fair (Fenasoja)
- South American Nativist Music Festival (Musicanto)
- State Meeting of horticulture (Hortigranjeiros)
- Dance in Santa Rosa Festival
- Festival of Ethnic Groups
- Piggy in Roller Feast
- Cruzeiro Neighborhood Community Fair (EXPOCruzeiro)
- Oktoberfest
- Student Song Festival (Canto Livre)
- Santa Rosa Shows Gramado

== Economy ==
In agriculture, the city has the largest dairy basin in Rio Grande do Sul, providing, together with pig farming, raw materials for agro-industries. The city has a large production of soybeans, yerba mate, as well as vegetables and colonial products. In industry, the city has a strong metal-mechanical hub, manufacturing parts, machines and agricultural implements, with companies such as AGCO and John Deere. Around 66% of Brazilian harvesters are produced in the city.

== Notable residents ==
- Xuxa, popular Brazilian celebrity
- Isa Souza, television chef
- Cláudio Taffarel, Brazilian World Cup winning goalkeeper
- Luís Carlos Winck, football player
- Deonise, handball player, World Champion

== See also ==
- List of municipalities in Rio Grande do Sul
