= 2023 Manaus Aerotáxi Embraer Bandeirante crash =

Fatal airplane crash in Brazil

2023 Manaus Aerotaxi Embraer EMB-110 Bandeirante crash
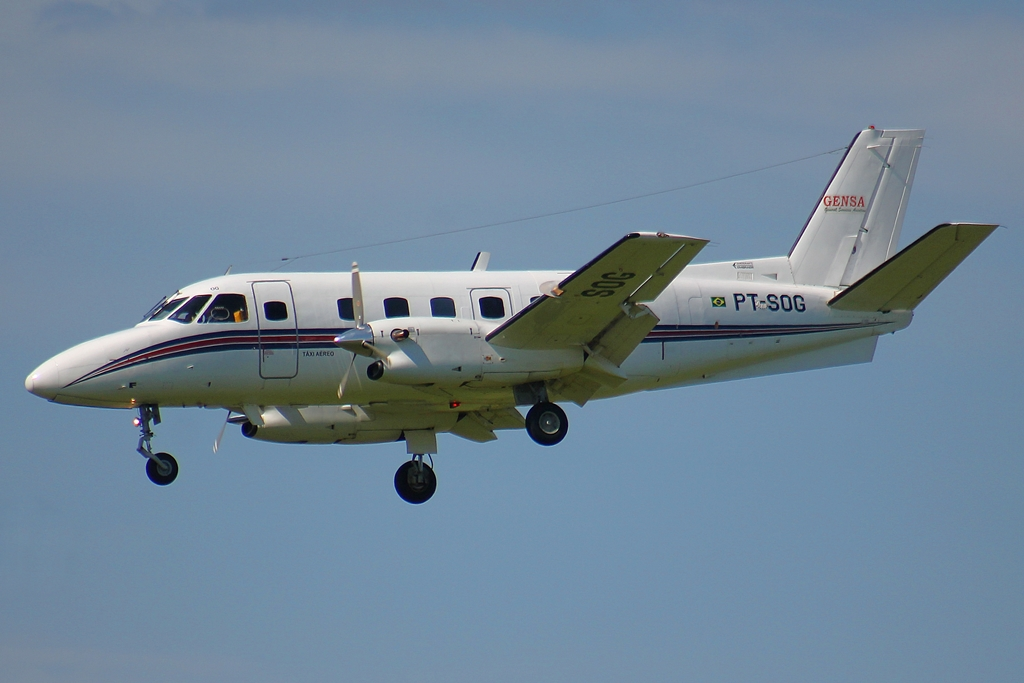
- PT-SOG, the aircraft involved in the accident in 2015, while still operated by its previous operator, Gensa.

Accident
- Date: 16 September 2023
- Summary: Crashed on approach, under investigation
- Site: Barcelos Airport, Barcelos, Amazonas, Brazil

Aircraft
- Aircraft type: Embraer EMB 110 Bandeirante
- Operator: Manaus Aerotáxi
- Registration: PT-SOG
- Flight origin: Eduardo Gomes International Airport
- Destination: Barcelos Airport
- Occupants: 14
- Passengers: 12
- Crew: 2
- Fatalities: 14
- Survivors: 0

On 16 September 2023, an Embraer 110 Bandeirante of Manaus Aerotáxi crashed on approach. The crash occurred as the aircraft was attempting to land at Barcelos Airport while performing a go-around, killing all 14 occupants on board. All the occupants on board were tourists going to a fishing competition in Rio Negro.

== Background ==
The accident took place during the high rainy season.

Barcelos is known for ecotourism activities, particularly fishing, and it is one of the main sport fishing destinations in Brazil.

== Accident ==
The aircraft was on final approach after an aborted landing and an attempt to go-around in heavy rain and bad weather conditions when it crashed into an embankment short of the runway. All the occupants on board the aircraft died. There was no post-crash fire.

Early reports stated that American citizens were among the victims; later reports stated that all the passengers were Brazilians.

Due to the bad weather, other airplanes that approached the airport at around the same time returned to Manaus.

== Aircraft ==
The aircraft involved in the accident was an Embraer 110 Bandeirante with registration PT-SOG, built in 1991 with serial number 110490.

The EMB-110P1 is powered by two PT6A-34 turboprop engines produced by Canadian manufacturer Pratt & Whitney Canada.

== Investigation ==
An investigation is launched into the cause of the accident. The bodies were taken to Manaus for formal identification.
