= Asas =

Asas or ASAS may refer to:

- Asas language, a Rai Coast language spoken in Madang Province, Papua New Guinea
- All Sky Automated Survey, a star-survey project
- American Society of Animal Science, a livestock and meat science organisation
- Asas de Portugal, a flight demonstration team of the Portuguese Air Force
- Autonomous Soil Assessment System by Mission Control Space Services
- Asas Linhas Aéreas, a defunct Airline of Brazil
