= Sideral Linhas Aéreas =

Brazilian airline

Sideral
IATA	ICAO	Call sign
0S	SID	SIDERAL
- Founded: June 22, 2009; 17 years ago
- Commenced operations: March 13, 2011; 15 years ago
- AOC #: 8,905 – August 22, 2022
- Operating bases: Afonso Pena International Airport
- Fleet size: 20
- Destinations: 14 (as of November 2024)
- Parent company: Grupo Econômico Expresso Adorno
- Headquarters: São José dos Pinhais, Brazil
- Key people: Paulo Adorno (Owner); Juliana Adorno (Owner)
- Employees: 230
- Website: siderallinhasaereas.com.br

Sideral Linhas Aéreas, formerly known as Sideral Air Cargo, is a Brazilian cargo and passenger charter airline headquartered in São José dos Pinhais, located in the Greater Curitiba, Paraná. It was established in 2009 as a subsidiary of Grupo Econômico Expresso Adorno.

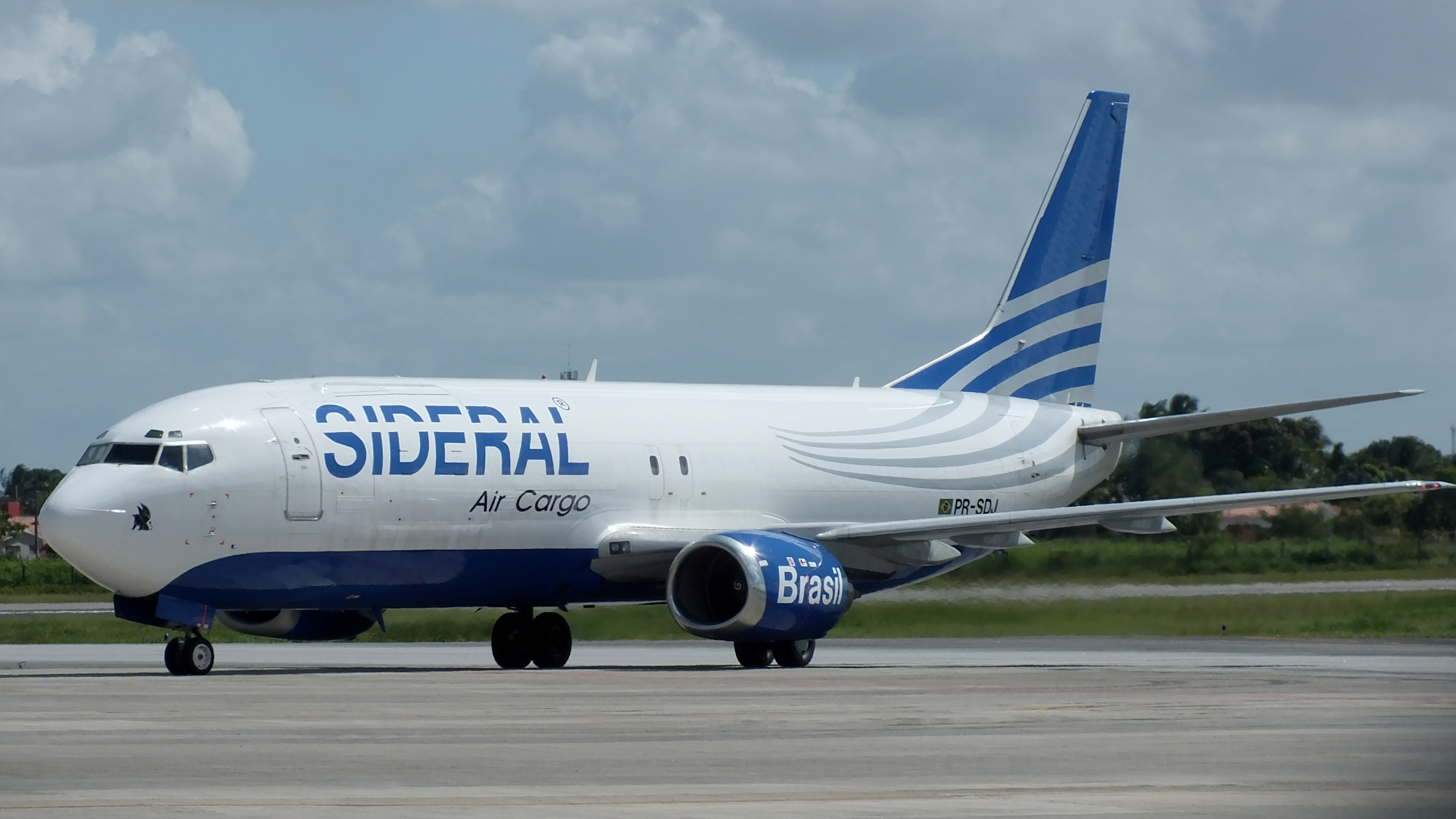
Sideral Linhas Aéreas Boeing 737-400SF reg. PR-SDJ

According to the National Civil Aviation Agency of Brazil (ANAC), between January and December 2023, Sideral Linhas Aéreas carried 16,462 passengers on charter flights and had 0.1% of the domestic market share in terms of revenue passenger kilometers (RPK), making it the seventh largest domestic airline, while transporting 48.7 thousand tons of cargo and had 37.1% of the domestic market share in terms of revenue tonne kilometer (RTK), making it the second largest cargo airline in Brazil.

== History ==
=== Establishment ===
Sideral Linhas Aéreas was founded in 2009 by the Grupo Econômico Expresso Adorno, a holding made up of nine intermodal transport companies headquartered in São José dos Pinhais, Paraná, with the aim of initially operating in the transport of cargo and air parcels.

==== 2010s ====
The new cargo airline received its first aircraft, the Boeing 737-300SF registration PR-SDL (MSN 24060) on August 31, 2010, becoming the first Brazilian airline to operate the cargo variant of the Boeing 737-300. On December 8, 2010, the aircraft performed its first certification flight for Sideral, taking off from its base of operations at Afonso Pena International Airport, in Curitiba, towards Porto Alegre, where it was unable to land and diverted to Florianópolis.

Sideral received its air operator's certificate (CHETA, in Portuguese) from the National Civil Aviation Agency of Brazil (ANAC) in February 2011. Its first commercial flight took place on March 13, 2011, when the Boeing 737 took off from São Paulo Guarulhos International Airport to Salvador da Bahia operating a flight on behalf of ABSA Cargo (now LATAM Cargo Brasil).

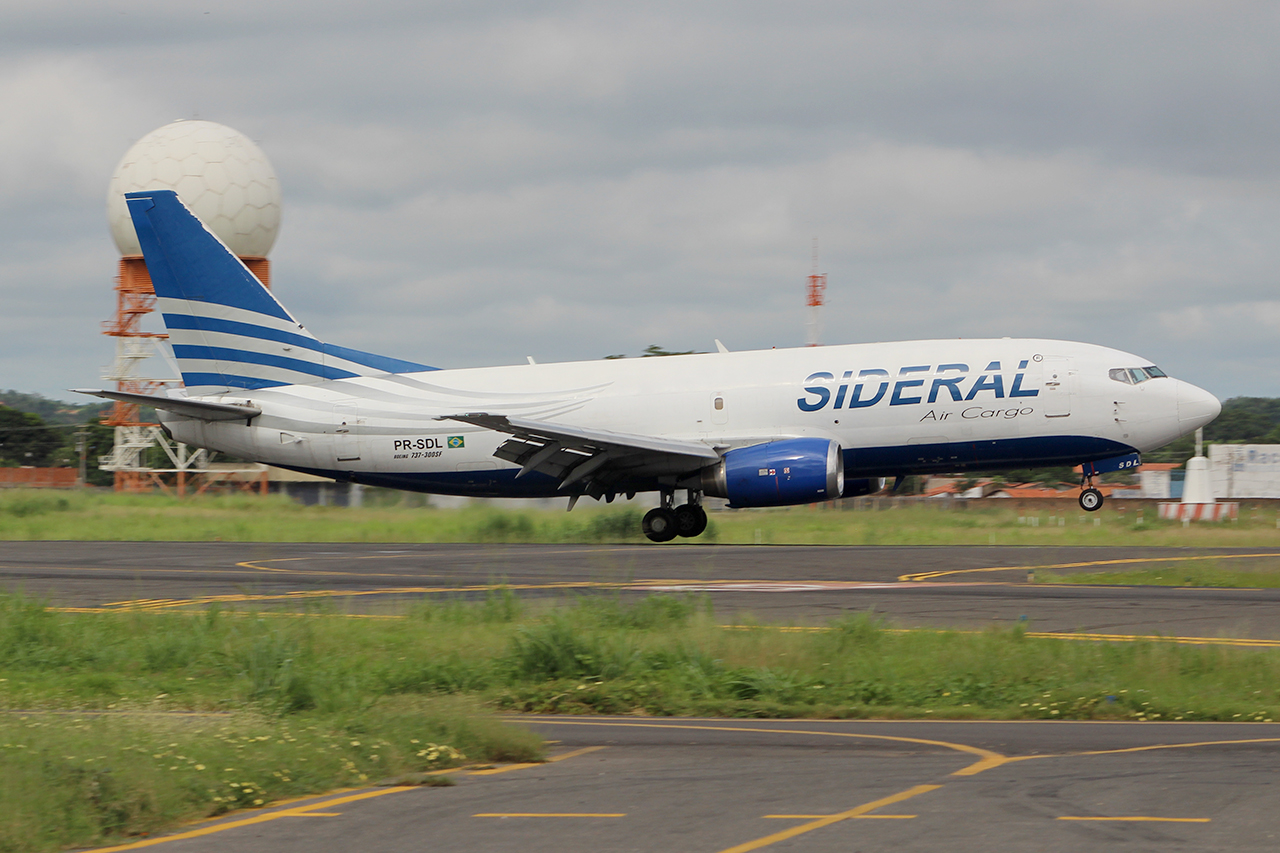
Sideral Linhas Aéreas Boeing 737-300SF reg. PR-SDL taking off from Teresina

=== First years (2011-2017) ===
In the same year, it obtained contracts with the Brazilian government to carry out nightmail flights on behalf of the Brazilian Post and Telegraph Company (ECT), also known as Correios, in the Night Postal Network (RPN), a postal service that allows cargo to be sent to destinations in less than 24 hours, in addition to cargo transportation services in general. In April 2013, Sideral received its second plane, a Boeing 737-400SF, and between January 2014 and November 2015, it added four more cargo planes to the fleet to meet Correios' growing demand for the transport of parcels.

In December 2015, it received its first plane capable of carrying passengers, a Boeing 737-300QC (Quick Change) and in the following months, it added four more Boeing 737 Classic, reaching the milestone of 10 planes in the fleet. In early 2017, to reinforce cargo transport capacity and high demand, Sideral acquired two Boeing 727-200F registrations PR-IOB (MSN 22983) and PR-IOC (MSN 22984), in addition to the 737-400SF PP-WSA (MSN 25375) from RIO Linhas Aéreas, which had recently suspended its operations.

=== Passenger charter flights (2017-2023) ===
On April 11, 2017, it received its first passenger-only plane, also a 737-300, creating speculation that it could enter the regular passenger transport market. On December 7, Sideral carried out an approval flight for (ANAC) to obtain authorization to transport passengers, further increasing speculation about regular passenger transport, but days later, on December 18, it announced that it would begin offer passenger charter flights.

The first passenger flight took place on the afternoon of May 8, 2018, a Tuesday, when the Boeing 737-300 registration PR-SDW (MSN 27273) took off from Afonso Pena International Airport towards Rosario, Argentina, fulfilling flight 9602 with the football team Brazilian Club Athletico Paranaense on board. Later, it incorporated two Boeing 737-500 with a 52-seat VIP configuration to offer charter flights for football teams in Brazil and other South American countries, offering a superior product compared to other aircraft from other airlines available on the market.

==== 2020s ====
On November 3, 2020, the airline announced a partnership with Brazil's MercadoLivre, the biggest online marketplaces dedicated to e-commerce and online auctions in Latin America, for the dedicated operation of cargo planes on behalf of Meli Air, launched as a virtual airline. Initially, the agreement included the operation of four Boeing 737 planes painted in the new airline's yellow colors, with the first plane, registration PR-SDM, being presented on the same day.

On June 30, 2022, the Brazilian Association of Airlines (ABEAR) announced Sideral Linhas Aéreas as the newest associate member, becoming the seventh Brazilian airline to join the association, along with Abaeté Aviação, Azul Linhas Aéreas, GOL Linhas Aéreas, LATAM Airlines, LATAM Cargo Brasil (formerly ABSA Cargo), RIMA Aviação and VOEPASS Linhas Aéreas.

In September 2022, just before completing two years of partnership, Sideral Linhas Aéreas and Mercado Livre ended their commercial relations after the online commerce company signed a strategic agreement with GOL Linhas Aéreas for the exclusive and dedicated operation of a fleet of Boeing 737-800BCF on behalf of Meli Air.

On October 14, 2022, it received its first passenger Boeing 737-800, its first Boeing 737 Next Generation and its 17th aircraft. As of February 2024, the Sideral Linhas Aéreas is the third largest global operator of the Boeing 737 Classic, with 16 aircraft of this generation in operation, behind only the American iAero Airways (28) and the Chinese SF Airlines (17).

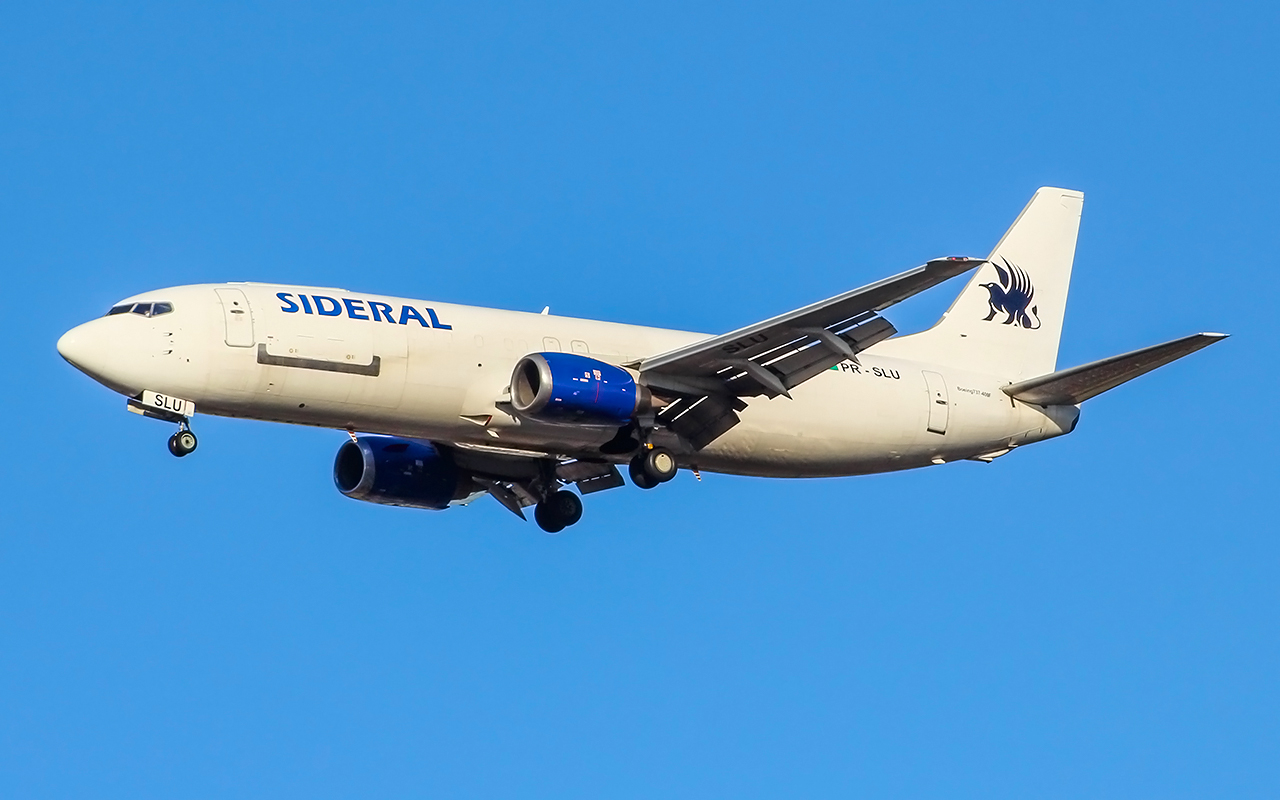
Sideral Linhas Aéreas Boeing 737-400SF

=== Plans for international expansion (2023-present) ===
On December 18, 2023, the airline submitted to the US Department of Transportation (DOT) a request to grant a Foreign Air Carrier Permit (FACP) based on the Open Skies Agreement signed between Brazil and the United States, for the transportation of both passengers and air cargo between the two countries. In the document to the regulatory body, Sideral signaled the signing of a Letter of Intent (LOI) to acquire two Boeing 777-200LRF (Freighter) to transport cargo between Brazil and China and which began the process to obtain IATA Operational Safety Audit (IOSA) certification.

In terms of US operations, Sideral initially aims to operate between 10 and 12 charter flights on behalf of sports teams, musical acts and other organizations in the first year of operations. It will earmark its only passenger Boeing 737-800, registration PR-SLA (MSN 28628), for its operations between Brazil and the United States. The airline also plans to buy one or more Boeing 737 converted firefighting aircraft to operate missions in the Amazon region, part of the "Sideral Moving Forward" strategy based on the carrier's ambition to "construct new paths" and grow in a "structured and sustainable" manner.

==== Partnership with São Paulo Futebol Clube ====
On January 22, 2024, Sideral signed an agreement with the professional football team São Paulo Futebol Clube, that plays in the top tier of the Brazilian football league system, to transport the team's players and technical staff during national and international matches for a period of two seasons. The agreement initially foresees the operation of the Boeing 737-800 Next Generation with a team sticker and from April 2024, a customized Boeing 737-700 (MSN 30651) fully configured with executive seats that is being prepared at Tucson International Airport in the United States.

The agreement reached between São Paulo and Sideral provides for 28 flights (round trip) per season, totaling 56 operations at the end of the two-year contract. Furthermore, with the arrival in April of the new Boeing, which will have a 64-seat configuration and will be dedicated to the São Paulo team, the club will have the right to explore the painting of the aircraft with its commercial partners, which could generate a new source of revenue.

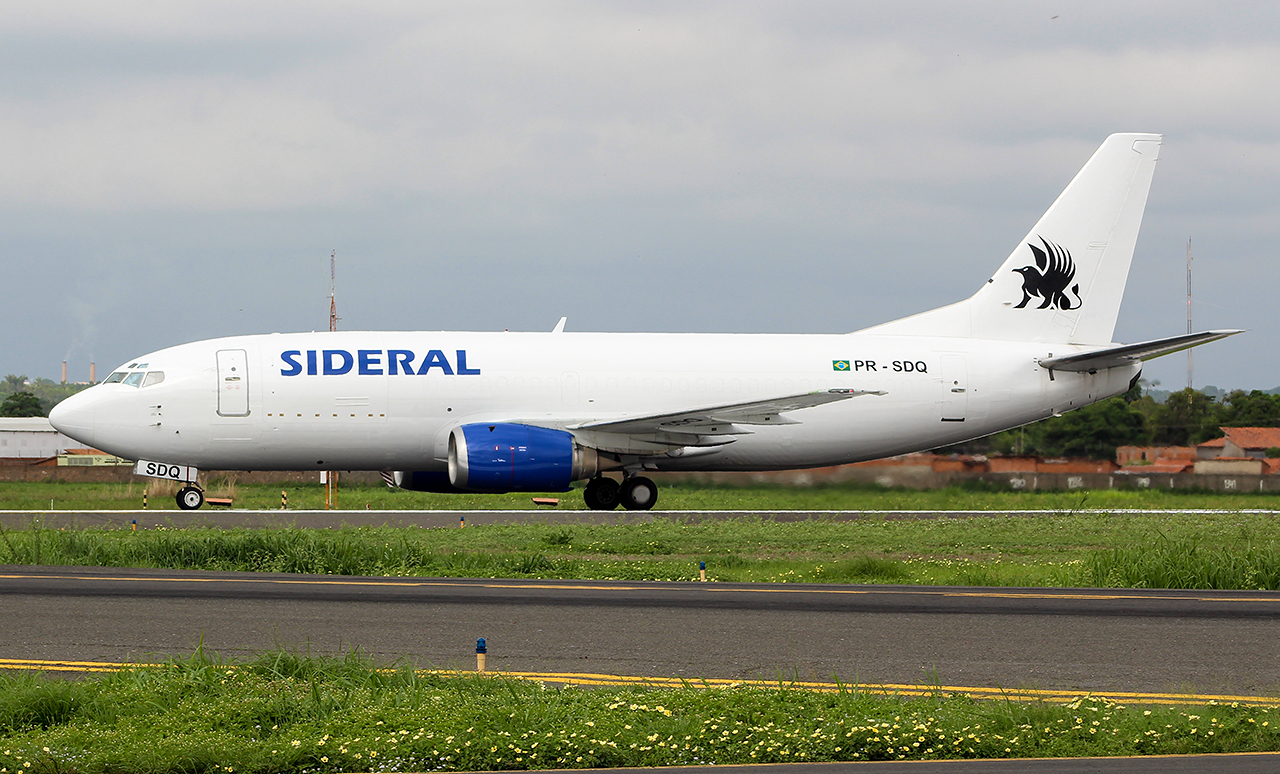
Sideral Linhas Aéreas Boeing 737-300BDSF reg. PR-SDQ taxiing in Teresina

==== Future ====
On February 13, 2024, the US DOT granted Sideral Linhas Aéreas FACP authorization for the airline, allowing it to carry out charter flights of both passengers and cargo from Brazil or with a stopover in Brazil to the United States through an intermediate point or to another point with a stopover in the United States.

Sideral said that for the year 2024, it has secured six conversion slots with US-based Aeronautical Engineers Inc. (AEI) for Boeing 737-800SF aircraft, which are expected to be converted from passenger to cargo version. The airline indicated that it has already acquired four aircraft of the variant, one of which is already converted and ready for delivery, while the other is still on the conversion line and should soon be ready to join the fleet. In addition, it also plans to incorporate a third Boeing 737-500 (MSN 25065) in executive configuration to serve the charter flight market for football teams, travel agencies and the corporate market, in addition to its first 737-700 which should reinforce its passengers' fleet.

== Destinations ==
Sideral Linhas Aéreas has the following operating bases (as of November 2024):

Base
Future
Terminated

Sideral Linhas Aéreas destinations
State	City	Airport	Notes
Amazonas
Amazonas	Manaus	Eduardo Gomes International Airport	—
Bahia
Bahia	Salvador da Bahia	Deputado Luís Eduardo Magalhães International Airport	—
Ceará
Ceará	Fortaleza	Pinto Martins International Airport	—
Distrito Federal
Distrito Federal	Brasília	President Juscelino Kubitschek International Airport	—
Goiás
Goiás	Goiânia	Santa Genoveva International Airport	—
Maranhão
Maranhão	São Luís do Maranhão	Marechal Cunha Machado International Airport	—
Mato Grosso do Sul
Mato Grosso do Sul	Campo Grande	Campo Grande International Airport	—
Minas Gerais
Minas Gerais	Belo Horizonte	Confins–Tancredo Neves International Airport	—
Pará
Pará	Belém	Val-de-Cans International Airport	—
Paraná
Paraná	Curitiba	Afonso Pena International Airport	HUB
Pernambuco
Pernambuco	Recife	Guararapes–Gilberto Freyre International Airport	—
Piauí
Piauí	Teresina	Senador Petrônio Portella Airport	—
Rio de Janeiro
Rio de Janeiro	Rio de Janeiro	Galeão–Antonio Carlos Jobim International Airport	—
São Paulo
São Paulo	São Paulo	Guarulhos Internacional Airport	—

== Fleet ==
=== Current fleet ===
As of August 2025, Sideral Linhas Aéreas operates the following aircraft:

Sideral Linhas Aéreas fleet
Aircraft	In service	Orders	Passengers			Notes
Aircraft	In service	Orders	J	Y	Total	Notes
Boeing 737-300	2	—	—	144	144	—
Boeing 737-500	2	1	52	—	52	All in J configuration for VIP charter flights
Boeing 737-700	1	—	64	—	64	—
Boeing 737-800	1	—	—	189	189	—
Sideral Linhas Aéreas Cargo fleet
Boeing 737-300BDSF	2	—	Cargo			—
Boeing 737-300QC	2	—	Cargo			Quick Change for 144 Y seats
Boeing 737-300SF	2	—	Cargo			—
Boeing 737-400SF	7	—	Cargo			Three aircraft opf Correios with cs
Boeing 737-800SF	1		Cargo			TBD std in Dothan for Cargo conversion
Total	20	2				

=== Former fleet ===
With the exception of the two Boeing 727-200F acquired from RIO Linhas Aéreas, which operated for a period of two years and later sold to other airlines, the other two aircraft that were part of the Sideral Linhas Aéreas fleet never entered commercial operation. The ATR 42-300 registration PT-MFE (MSN 295), acquired from Total Linhas Aéreas, remained on the ground and was later sold to its last operator, MAP Linhas Aéreas.

The Boeing 737-300 registration PR-CID (MSN 25033) was acquired from Clube Náutico Água Limpa after eight years in storage and unairworthy at Prof. Eribelto Manoel Reino Airport. Later, mechanics from Sideral Linhas Aéreas went to São José do Rio Preto, in São Paulo, to prepare it for the special ferry flight authorized by ANAC, carried out at low altitude and with the landing gear extended, to the company's headquarters in Afonso Pena International Airport, where it remains stored to this day without the engines. According to sources close to the airline, it was acquired to be cannibalized and serve as a source of spare parts.

Retired Sideral Linhas Aéreas fleet
Aircraft	Total	Years of operation	Note
ATR 42-300	1	2015-2016	Never entered service, transferred to MAP Linhas Aéreas
Boeing 727-200F	2	2017-2019	Sold to Air Class Líneas Aéreas and Asas Linhas Aéreas
Boeing 737-300	1	2022-2022	Never entered service and std in Curitiba
Total	4		

== See also ==
- List of airlines of Brazil
