= Cenipa =

Cenipa can refer to:

- Centro de Investigação e Prevenção de Acidentes Aeronáuticos, investigates aviation incidents in Brazil
- A species of Canidae
