= 2009 Manaus Aerotáxi Embraer Bandeirante crash =

Aviation accident in Brazil

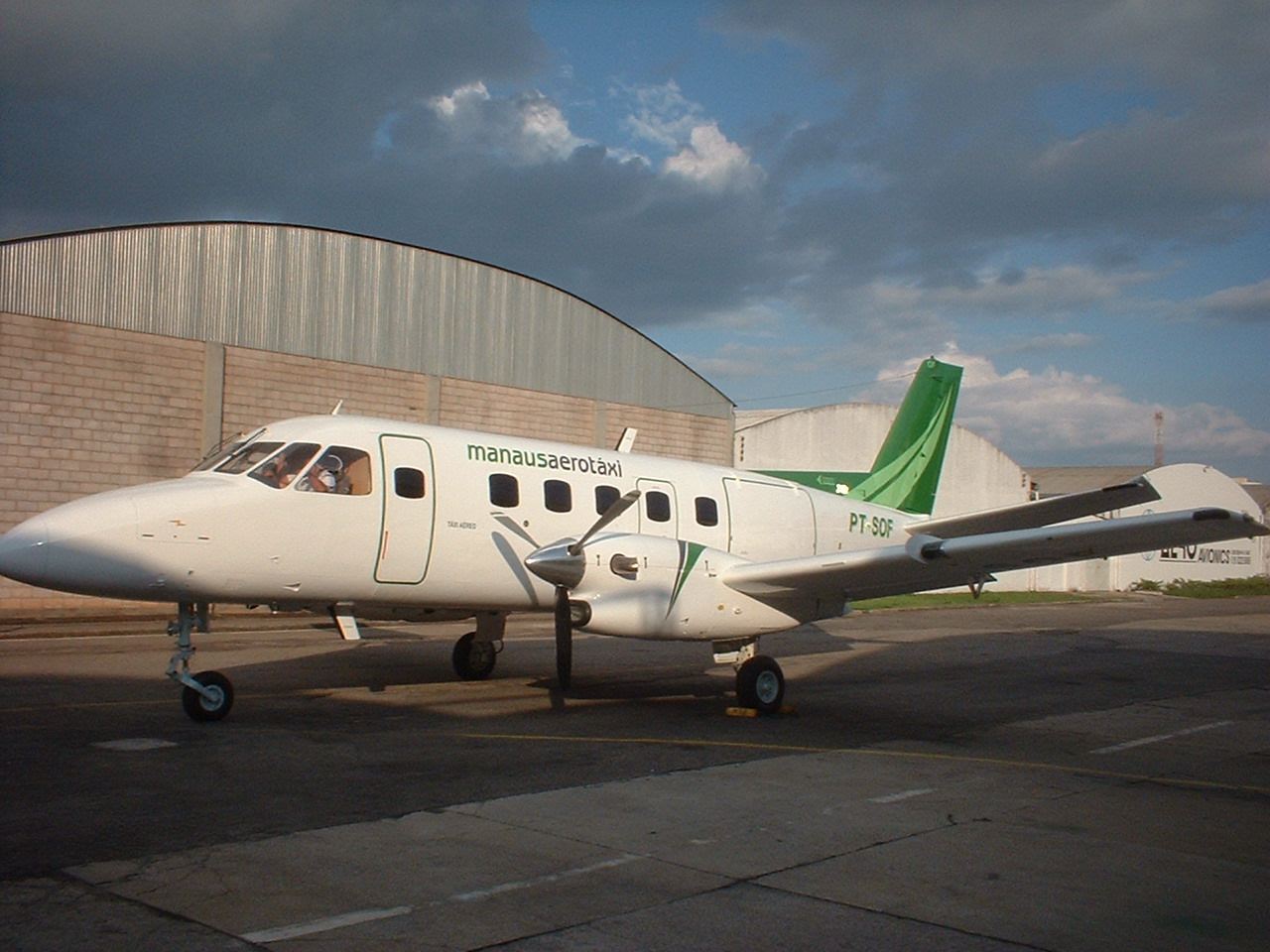
- A Manaus Aerotáxi Embraer EMB 110 Bandeirante similar to accident aircraft

Accident
- Date: February 7, 2009
- Summary: Overloading
- Site: Manacapuru River; 3°15′33″S 60°40′19″W

Aircraft
- Aircraft type: Embraer EMB-110P1 Bandeirante
- Operator: Manaus Aerotáxi
- Registration: PT-SEA
- Flight origin: Coari, Brazil
- Destination: Manaus, Brazil
- Occupants: 28
- Passengers: 26
- Crew: 2
- Fatalities: 24
- Injuries: 4
- Survivors: 4

The crash of an Embraer EMB-110P1 Bandeirante owned and operated by Manaus Aerotáxi occurred in the state of Amazonas in Brazil on February 7, 2009. At 13:50 local time, a Manaus Aerotáxi Embraer EMB-110P1 Bandeirante twin turboprop, registration PT-SEA, operating as an air taxi flight from Coari (SWKO) to Manaus (SBEG), crashed into the Manacapuru River about 80 kilometers (50 mi) southwest of its destination, killing the two crew and 22 of the 26 passengers on board. The four surviving passengers, who were seated in the rear, managed to escape the sinking plane and swim safely to shore. Among the passengers were eight small children of whom one survived, and a family of 17, two of whom survived.

== Crash ==
The Embraer EMB-110P1 Bandeirante twin turboprop aircraft, registration PT-SEA and serial number 110352, was carrying twenty-eight people, though it was certificated for twenty-one. Shortly before the crash, the pilot reportedly attempted to turn back to Coari due to heavy rainfall, but then had to make an emergency landing at an abandoned runway of the city of Manacapura. Survivors said they saw one of the airplane's propellers stop rotating before the crash.

The plane plunged into the river at a point about 500 meters from the abandoned runway, and 20 minutes away from its intended destination Manaus, and it submerged to a depth of about five to seven meters. The four survivors (three adults and one nine-year-old child), who were sitting at the rear of the plane, managed to open an emergency exit and reach the surface; they did not suffer major injuries.

Nearly forty rescue workers, including nine scuba divers and civil defense officials, spent the night searching through the jungle for survivors. Rescue crews were able to recover all twenty-four bodies; all deaths were attributed to drowning. The victims were fifteen adult passengers, seven children, and the two crew members.

The newspaper Folha de S.Paulo reported that the plane was packed with members of one family on their way to Manaus to celebrate the birthday of a relative. Fifteen of the fatal victims and two survivors belonged to this family. Paulo Roberto Pereira, a spokesman for the charter company involved, initially misreported the number of people on board, saying that there had been twenty-two passengers and two crew members aboard but later increased that figure to twenty-six passengers and two crew members.

== Investigation ==
Brazil's Aeronautical Accidents Investigation and Prevention Center (CENIPA) investigated the crash, and issued its final report on July 30, 2010. CENIPA concluded that the twin engine turboprop aircraft took off overweight, and its left engine failed while en route. Unable to maintain level flight on a single engine in its overweight condition, the aircraft crashed while attempting to execute an emergency landing.

According to CENIPA, the aircraft departed Coari weighing 549.7 kg above its maximum certificated takeoff weight, with 28 persons on board, including two crew and 26 passengers, while the aircraft was certificated for a maximum of two crew and 19 passengers. There were only 18 passenger seats installed in the aircraft, so eight passengers traveled as "lap children", a situation CENIPA called "inconsistent with reality" (situação que não condizia com a realidade). CENIPA noted that when the pilot in command contacted Amazonic Center air traffic control by radio, he reported 20 persons on board, instead of the actual 28.
