= São Paulo plane crash =

São Paulo plane crash can refer to any of the following plane crashes which occurred in São Paulo, Brazil:

- Voepass Linhas Aéreas Flight 2283, which occurred on August 9, 2024.
- TAM Airlines Flight 3054, which occurred on July 17, 2007
- TAM Transportes Aéreos Regionais Flight 402, which occurred on October 31, 1996
