= Manaus Aerotáxi =

Brazilian air taxi airline

IATA	ICAO	Call sign
—	—	—
- Founded: April 1998; 28 years ago
- AOC #: 7,878 - April 27, 2022
- Hubs: Eduardo Gomes International Airport
- Fleet size: 4 (as of April 2024)
- Parent company: MAP Aviação
- Headquarters: Manaus, Brazil
- Key people: Alexandre da Silva Nascimento (President); Fábner Louzada Depizzol (COO)
- Founder: Marcos J. Pacheco
- Website: www.manausaerotaxi.com.br

Manaus Aerotáxi is a non-scheduled airline and air taxi company headquartered in Manaus, Brazil, specializing in charter flights and air medical services certified by the National Civil Aviation Agency (ANAC) under the Brazilian Civil Aviation Regulations (RBAC) No. 135.

Founded in 1998, the company has contracts with the Brazilian Ministry of Defense to transport passengers, cargo and medevac to serve riverside communities in the Legal Amazon region.

== History ==
=== Establishment ===
Manaus Aerotáxi was founded in April 1998 by pilot Marcos J. Pacheco, focused on transporting passengers and cargo through the interior of Amazonas, where several cities and communities are inaccessible by land, being possible only through the waterway or air, the latter considered an essential service.

In 2009, the airline was certified by ANAC to provide air medical services.

==== MAP Linhas Aéreas ====
On May 18, 2011, Manaus Aerotáxi founded MAP Linhas Aéreas, a regional airline focused on regular air transport of passengers and cargo in the Brazilian Amazon region. MAP's name is the acronym for Manaus Aerotáxi Participações, the corporate name of its parent company. Subsequently, the two companies became part of the economic group MAP Aviação Eduardo Gomes International Airport, in Manaus, the airline's headquarters.

On October 1, 2014, Manaus Aerotáxi became a contractor for the Brazilian Ministry of Defense, leasing four turboprops aircraft to transport cargo of interest to the Regional Works Commission of the 12th Military Region, linked to the Brazilian Army, based in Manaus.

On August 21, 2019, the economic group MAP Aviação, which controls Manaus Aerotáxi, and MAP Linhas Aéreas, announced the sale of 100% of its shareholding in the regional airline MAP to Passaredo Linhas Aéreas, which on the same day announced its rebranding to VOEPASS Linhas Aéreas.

==== New visual identity ====
As of September 2020, Manaus Aerotáxi started to adopt a new visual identity on its aircraft, in the colors blue, white and gray, replacing the green color previously used. The first plane to receive the new livery was the Cessna 208B Grand Caravan registration PR-MNS (MSN 208B2065), on September 14, 2020. The airline's logo was also updated, becoming blue and gray, accompanied by the slogan "Da Amazônia para o Brasil" (From the Amazon to Brazil, in English).

== Aviation services ==
In addition to non-scheduled and air taxi flights, Manaus Aerotáxi also offers fixed-base operator (FBO) aeronautical services such as fueling, hangaring, handling, tie-down, parking and aircraft maintenance both in its hangar at Eduardo Gomes International Airport, in Manaus, and also located at Val-de-Cans/Júlio Cezar Ribeiro International Airport, in Belém, Pará, providing support services to general aviation operators at a public-use airport.

== Fleet ==
=== Current fleet ===
As of April 2024 the fleet of Manaus Aerotáxi included the following aircraft:

Manaus Aerotáxi fleet
Aircraft	Total	Orders	Passengers	Notes
Cessna 208 Caravan Amphibian	1	—	8	—
Cessna 208B Grand Caravan	1	—	9	—
Cessna 650 Citation III	1	—	9	Replaced one of the same model
Embraer EMB 110C Bandeirante	1	—	15	—
TOTAL	4	—		

=== Former fleet ===
Manaus Aerotáxi formerly operated the following aircraft:

Retired Manaus Aerotáxi fleet
Aircraft	Total	Introduced	Retired	Notes
Bombardier Learjet 45	1	2010	2022	—
Embraer EMB 110P1 Bandeirante	3	2001	2023	Two lost in accidents
Embraer EMB 121 Xingú	1	2006	2011	—
Rockwell 690B Turbo Commander	3	2007	2011	—

== Accidents and incidents ==
- On February 7, 2009, the Embraer EMB 110P1 Bandeirante registration PT-SEA, operating an air taxi flight between Coari and Manaus with 26 passengers and 2 crew, disappeared from radars 20 minutes before landing. The wreckage of the plane was later located by Brazilian Air Force (FAB) search and rescue teams in the Manacapuru River, about 80 kilometers (50 miles) southwest of the Amazonian capital. The two crew and 22 of the 26 passengers on board died.
- On September 16, 2023, during the beginning of the fishing season in the Amazon, the Embraer EMB 110P1 Bandeirante registration PT-SOG, operating a charter flight carrying two crew members and 12 tourists from different regions of Brazil between Manaus and Barcelos for sport and recreational fishing in the Rio Negro, crashed during a failed go-around attempt in heavy rain at Barcelos Airport. All 14 passengers and crew died.

== See also ==
- GENSA
- MAP Linhas Aéreas
- List of airlines of Brazil
