= MAP Linhas Aéreas =

Brazilian domestic airline

IATA	ICAO	Call sign
7M	PAM	MAP AIR
- Founded: May 18, 2011; 15 years ago
- Commenced operations: March 4, 2013; 13 years ago
- Ceased operations: 24 June 2025
- Operating bases: Eduardo Gomes International Airport
- Fleet size: 3
- Parent company: Voepass Linhas Aéreas
- Headquarters: Manaus, Brazil
- Founder: Marcos J. Pacheco
- Website: www.voepass.com.br

MAP Linhas Aéreas was a Brazilian domestic airline headquartered in Manaus, Amazonas. Founded in 2011, the airline was authorized to operate regular and non-regular charter flights within Brazil. According to the National Civil Aviation Agency of Brazil (ANAC), between January and December 2023, MAP carried 117,912 passengers and had a domestic market share (RPK) of 0.1%, making it the fifth largest airline in Brazil.

== History ==
=== Establishment 2010s ===
Founded in Manaus, Brazil, on May 18, 2011, the name of MAP Linhas Aéreas is the acronym of the first letters of the name of its founding company, Manaus Aerotáxi Participações, an air taxi and non-scheduled airline based at Eduardo Gomes International Airport. The airline was founded due to the lack of air connectivity in the Brazilian Amazon region, where air transport plays an important role in connecting small cities to urban centers.

MAP Linhas Aéreas received its air operator's certificate (CHETA, in Portuguese) from the National Civil Aviation Agency of Brazil (ANAC) on August 14, 2012 for regular operations. That same year, it received its first three ATR 42-300 turboprop aircraft, registrations PR-MPN (MSN 020), PR-MPO (MSN 091) and PR-TTF (MSN 021), all acquired from TRIP Linhas Aéreas. With the exception of the first two, the last one received never went into operation, serving as a source of spare parts to keep the other two active.

=== 2013-2019 ===
On March 4, 2013, connected Manaus with Parintins and Lábrea, in Amazonas. In the third quarter of 2013, MAP added two ATR 72-200s to the fleet, ending the year with four aircraft.

In the first half of 2014, the airline began its regional expansion, starting flights to Carauari, in Amazonas and later, on August 11, to Santarém, Itaituba, Altamira and Belém, in Pará. It also added a third ATR 72-200 to the fleet, through a commercial agreement signed with STAR Consultoria Aeronáutica, owner of the plane registration PP-STY (MSN 367).

On March 30, 2015, began flights to Porto Velho, Rondônia, followed by Manicoré, Humaitá, Barcelos, Coari, Eirunepé, São Gabriel da Cachoeira and Tefé. The following year, it added Porto Trombetas and Tabatinga to its network of Amazonian destinations.

On October 9, 2016, presented a visual identity and aircraft livery, with the aim of displaying a more Amazonian tone, in line with its operations. The main change was in the tail of the planes, which instead of displaying the company's logo, started to adopt a design that incorporates elements from the North Region, including buildings such as the Amazon Theatre and the Ver-o-Peso Market, in addition to the flora, the fauna, cuisine and rivers of the Amazon.

On April 5, 2017, flights were announced for the "Rota da Soja" (Soy Route) in June, flying to Sorriso and Alta Floresta, in Mato Grosso. Due technical and logistical reasons, flights were not started. In mid-September, it announced a destination and fleet expansion plan for 2018, considering launching flights to several destinations in the Northeast Region, in addition to international flights in South America, in neighboring countries in the North of Brazil.

On December 18, 2017, received the IOSA (IATA Operational Safety Audit) certification, the most important safety and quality certificate in aviation.

On February 14, 2019, received its third ATR-72 aircraft, registration PR-MPW (MSN 682), announcing its expansion plan by increasing the frequency of flights to existing destinations and expressing its intention to fly to its first international destination, the city of Puerto Maldonado, in Peru.

=== Acquisition by Passaredo Linhas Aéreas (2019-2025) ===
==== The fight for slots in São Paulo Congonhas Airport ====
On July 27, 2019, after the bankruptcy of Avianca Brasil, the main Brazilian airlines began a dispute to obtain the valuable slots (landing and take-off times) left by it at Congonhas Airport, located in the heart of the city of São Paulo, the second largest busiest airport in Brazil by passengers number. MAP expressed its interest in obtaining them and entered the dispute against Azul Brazilian Airlines, GOL Linhas Aéreas Inteligentes, LATAM Airlines, TwoFlex (now Azul Conecta) and Passaredo Linhas Aéreas (now VOEPASS Linhas Aéreas) for the 41 slots in Congonhas.

On August 1, 2019, ANAC completed the provisional distribution process of Avianca Brasil's 41 daily departure and arrival times (slots) to operate on the main runway at Congonhas Airport, in São Paulo, with MAP obtaining 12 of them, behind Azul (15 slots) and Passaredo (14 slots).

On August 21, 2019, targeting the slots in São Paulo Congonhas Airport, Passaredo Linhas Aéreas (VOEPASS Linhas Aéreas) announced the acquisition of 100% control of MAP Linhas Aéreas, jointly holding 26 pairs of slots. Despite the acquisition, the airlines would continue to coexist. In September, together, they started flights from Congonhas to Ribeirão Preto, Bauru, Marília and Araçatuba, in São Paulo, Dourados, in Mato Grosso do Sul, Uberaba, in Minas Gerais and Macaé, in Rio de Janeiro.

==== 2020s ====
On March 18, 2020, due to the outbreak of the COVID-19 pandemic, MAP Linhas Aéreas suspended all its commercial flights with immediate effect, at least until March 22, when it planned to resume flights. However, two days later, on March 20, he announced that the suspension would be indefinite, maintaining only its chartered flights for Petrobras. After three months of suspension, on July 3, 2020, MAP Linhas Aéreas resumed its flights to 10 cities in the Amazon region, whose air transport is considered essential due to the lack of access by land.

==== Attempted acquisition by GOL Linhas Aéreas ====
On June 8, 2021, aiming to expand its presence at Congonhas Airport and reinforce operations in the interior of the Amazon, GOL Linhas Aéreas formalized an agreement with VOEPASS Linhas Aéreas for the acquisition of MAP Linhas Aéreas for R$28 million (US$5.6 million), in addition to assuming the airline's financial commitments, at the time valued at R$100 million (US$20.1 million), subject to government approval.

On January 3, 2022, Brazil's national competition regulator CADE (Administrative Council for Economic Defense) approved without restrictions the acquisition of MAP by GOL Linhas Aéreas. At the time, according to the president of GOL, Paulo Kakinoff, MAP Linhas Aéreas would be absolved by GOL Linhas Aéreas and the brand would cease to exist.

On April 26, 2023, the ew president of GOL Linhas Aéreas, Celso Guimarães Ferrer, informed that the acquisition had not been completed, the reason was a new decree published by the Brazilian government at the end of 2022, which allowed airlines could sell their slots, without the need for an M&A (merger and acquisition) transition. Thus, the airline was studying the purchase of slots from VOEPASS Linhas Aéreas and no longer the operations of MAP Linhas Aéreas.

==== Recent ====
Until April 29, 2024, the air operator's certificate, brand, crew, two ATR 42-500 and one ATR 72-500 turboprops registered in the name of MAP Linhas Aéreas, remained in operation from its base in Eduardo Gomes International Airport. The first plane, registration PR-PDP (MSN 581), fulfilled contract no. 5900.0111285.19.2 for Petrobras and flew to Carauari and Porto Urucu. The second, PR-PDS (MSN 561), operated on an interchange basis with VOEPASS carrying out flights in the Northeast Region through a commercial agreement with LATAM Airlines. The third, PR-PDT (MSN 771), was operating flights for VOEPASS Linhas Aéreas.

On March 11, 2025, the National Civil Aviation Agency of Brazil suspended all operations of MAP and parent company Voepass due to management issues. On April 23, 2025, Voepass filed for bankruptcy protection, blaming financial woes caused by LATAM Airlines, reporting about 209.2 million reais ($36.78 million) in debt caused by the Flight 2283 crash.

== Fleet ==
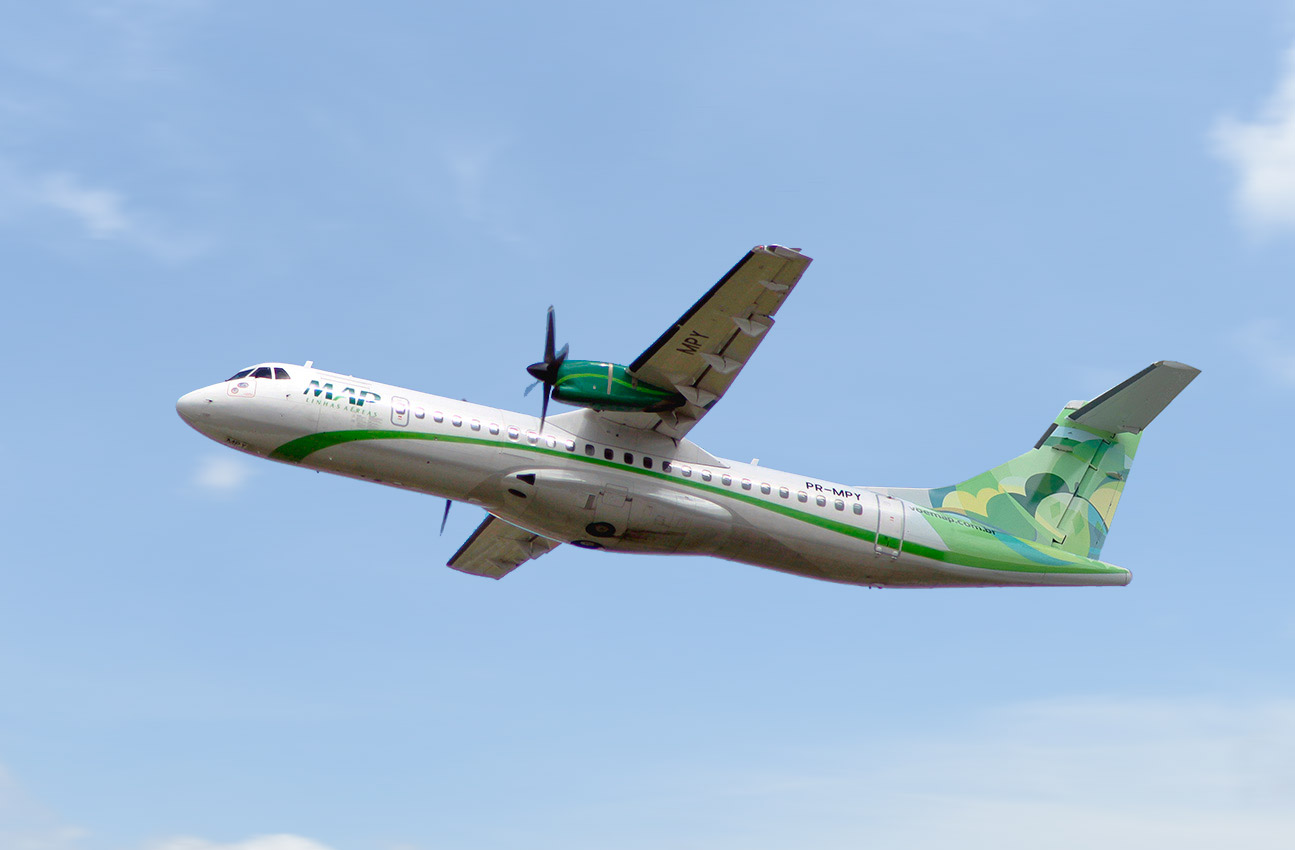
MAP Linhas Aéreas ATR 72-500

As of August 2025, MAP Linhas Aéreas operated the following aircraft:

MAP Linhas Aéreas fleet
Aircraft	Out of service	Orders	Passengers	Note
ATR 42-500	2	—	42	Aircraft abandoned in Manaus
ATR 72-500	1	—	—	Aircraft abandoned in Manaus
TOTAL	3	—		

=== Former fleet ===
Throughout its history, eight turboprops from the Franco-Italian aircraft manufacturer ATR had been part of MAP Linhas Aéreas, six of them owned by the airline and two leased that were returned to their owners. The ATR 42-300s turboprops registrations PR-MPN (MSN 020) and PR-MPO (MSN 091) are unairworthy and abandoned on a lawn in front of apron 4 at Eduardo Gomes International Airport; the other two, registrations PR-TTF (MSN 021) and PT-MFE (MSN 295), were dismantled and removed from the airport.

The ATR 72-200 registration PR-MPZ (MSN 523), unairworthy, is abandoned and resting on trestles in the hangar of Manaus Aerotáxi in Eduardo Gomes International Airport, while the PR-MPY (MSN 519), also unairworthy, is at the VOEPASS Linhas Aéreas maintenance center (MRO) in Dr. Leite Lopes Airport.

Retired MAP Linhas Aéreas fleet
Aircraft	Total	Years of operation	Note
ATR 42-300	4	2012-2019	dbr and std in Manaus
ATR 42-300	4	2012-2017	wfu and std in Manaus
ATR 42-300	4	2012-2012	wfu, std and broken up in Manaus
ATR 42-300	4	2016-2020	wfu, to be preserved as a hotel
ATR 72-200	3	2014-2015	lsd STAR Consultoria Aeronáutica
ATR 72-200	3	2013-2019	wfu and std in Manaus
ATR 72-200	3	2013-2020	wfu and std in Ribeirão Preto
ATR 72-500	1	2018-2020	ret ATRiam Capital
TOTAL	8		

== Accidents and incidents ==
According to data from The Aviation Herald and Aviation Safety Network, since the beginning of its operations in 2013, MAP Linhas Aéreas has recorded only one accident and one serious incident, but without any serious injuries or fatalities.

- On June 15, 2019, the ATR 42-300 registration PR-MPN (MSN 020), performing flight PAM-5914 that took off from Manaus to Carauari with 34 passengers and four crew, was climbing out when the crew needed to decide to return to the capital of Amazonas, performing a belly landing at Eduardo Gomes International Airport after suffering an electrical failure. Only two passengers suffered minor injuries during the evacuation and the turboprop was damaged beyond repair.
- On September 16, 2019, the ATR 72-200 registration PR-MPY (MSN 519), performing flight PAM-5913 from Itaituba to Manaus with 39 passengers and four crew members, had to return to the aerodrome of origin after the runway at Eduardo Gomes International Airport was closed due to an incident with another aircraft. During the final approach at Itaituba Airport, the left engine went out, followed by the right engine shortly after landing. According to the initial report from the Brazilian Aeronautical Accidents Investigation and Prevention Center (CENIPA), the serious incident was classified as a out of fuel. On December 29, 2023, CENIPA released the final report of the investigation, concluding that the out of fuel was caused by a failure that was not identified by the maintenance team and crew in the turboprop's fuel system, which led to the indication system of aircraft fuel not working properly, causing discrepancies between the amount shown on the cockpit indicators and the amount of fuel present in the tanks.

== See also ==
- Manaus Aerotáxi
- List of defunct airlines of Brazil
