= Gensa =

Brazilian regional airline

GENSA
IATA	ICAO	Call sign
-	GEN	GENSA-BRASIL
- Founded: 1996; 30 years ago (as GSA-Globo Serviços & Aerotáxi)
- Ceased operations: April 2019; 7 years ago
- Hubs: Campo Grande International Airport
- Fleet size: 3 (at the time of suspension)
- Headquarters: Campo Grande, Brazil
- Key people: Luswagner Alexandre Silva (CEO)
- Founder: Marcos Ferreira Sampaio
- Website: www.voegensa.com.br

GENSA (acronym for General Serviços Aéreos), was a regional airline and air taxi headquartered in Campo Grande, Brazil. It was founded in 1996 in São Paulo and remained in operation until April 2019, offering air taxi services and charters with its only plane.

== History ==
=== GSA-Globo Serviços & Aerotáxi (1996-1999) ===
==== Establishment ====
GENSA's history dates back to 1996, when it was founded in São Paulo as GSA-Globo Serviços & Aerotáxi, an air taxi company focused on charter flights for travel agencies and corporate flights, using an Embraer EMB 110 Bandeirante, registration PT-SOG (MSN 110490), with the main partner being company Charmclubs Brasil, owned by businessman Marcos Ferreira Sampaio, founder and owner of Pantanal Linhas Aéreas.

With the change of Pantanal Linhas Aéreas operations to the southeast region of Brazil in May 1997, GENSA moved its headquarters to Campo Grande, in Mato Grosso do Sul, where it inherited all the infrastructure left by the airline, taking over flights to Dourados and Ponta Porã using its only plane and later, incorporating a second Embraer EMB 110 Bandeirante "borrowed" by Pantanal.

In 1998, it suspended all regular routes previously operated by Pantanal, returned the second plane that had been incorporated a year earlier and transferred its only Embraer Bandeirante to Pampulha Airport, in Belo Horizonte, Minas Gerais, to fulfill a transport contract signed with the Italian manufacturer FIAT.

=== General Serviços Aéreos (1999-2019) ===
With the end of the contract with FIAT in 1999, GSA-Globo Serviços & Aerotáxi requested authorization from the National Civil Aviation Agency of Brazil (ANAC) for non-scheduled passenger and cargo flights, and to change its name to GENSA (General Serviços Aéreos), becoming a supplementary transport airline, qualifying to be outsourced to fulfill a contract between Pantanal and Petrobras to transport workers between Manaus and the oil and natural gas province of Porto Urucu. The contract with Petrobras ended at the end of 2000 and at the beginning of the following year, GENSA suspended its operations until the end of 2002 to carry out a heavy maintenance process (C-Check) on its only aircraft.

During this period, GENSA transferred its headquarters to São Paulo, returning again to Mato Grosso do Sul in 2002 to restart its operations connecting Corumbá and Rondonópolis to Campo Grande from November 17, 2002.

The airline's intention was to increase the number of destinations in Mato Grosso do Sul and expand to Mato Grosso with the arrival of another EMB 110 Bandeirante, registration PT-SHN (MSN 110460), and plans to incorporate four Embraer EMB 120 Brasilia into the fleet. During this period, the airline also started flying to Alta Floresta, Bonito, Cuiabá, Juína, Matupá, Nova Mutum, Sapezal and Sinop.

However, with the resumption of Passaredo Linhas Aéreas flights in Mato Grosso, GENSA changed its plans and returned to being a charter and non-scheduled cargo airline in 2005. In 2007, it was still planning its return to regular flights and charter flights with EMB 120 Brasilia aircraft; two aircraft, registrations PR-GSA (MSN 120119) and PR-GSB (MSN 120127), were even delivered to the airline in 2008, but never flew and are still today stored at Campo Grande International Airport. The airline then started to offer air taxi services using its two EMB 110 Bandeirante.

==== Voe Canelinha ====
In 2015, GENSA tried again to return to the air market with domestic flights, operating a regular route between Porto Alegre and Canela, a tourist city located in the Serra Gaúcha, in Rio Grande do Sul. The initiative called "Voe CaneLinha" was a partnership with Opções Turismo to connect the capital to the tourism hub in the interior, with six daily flights. The project would last a few weeks until operations were suspended due to maintenance problems with its only active aircraft.

On October 17, 2016, GENSA tried again to launch its flights in Rio Grande do Sul, this time through a partnership with Air Sul Viagem Aérea, expanding services and the number of destinations, with flights also to Bento Gonçalves, with the aircraft receiving the livery from Air Sul. However, at the end of the same year, flights were canceled due to lack of demand.

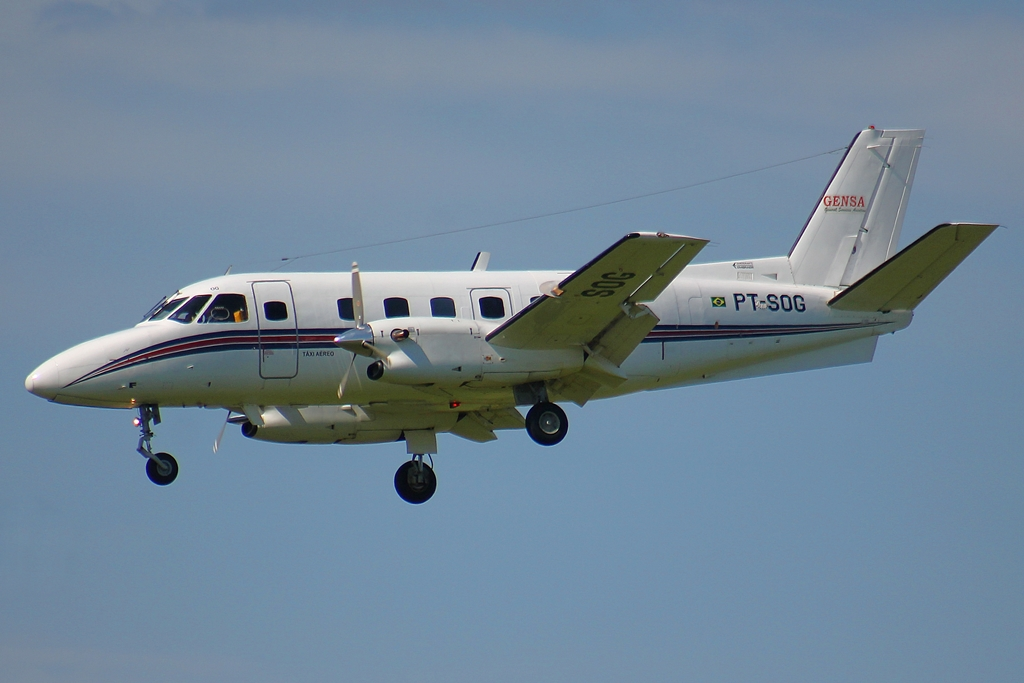
EMB 110 Bandeirante registration PT-SOG during approach to landing in Porto Alegre

==== Voa Piauí ====
In July 2017, GENSA was hired by TWfly Turismo to participate in the "Voe Piauí" initiative, launched by the Piauí state government to promote air connectivity between the capital Teresina and tourist cities on the coast and interior, such as Picos, São Raimundo Nonato and Parnaíba. However, on November 28, 2017, it suspended all flights due to scheduled maintenance (1C-Check) of the EMB 110 Bandeirante PT-SOG.

At the end of 2017, GENSA transferred its only plane to Eduardo Gomes International Airport, in Manaus, starting to operate in partnership with Manaus Aerotáxi. In April 2019, the company definitively suspended its operations and sold the EMB 110 Bandeirante registration PT-SOG to Manaus Aerotáxi which, on 16 September 2023, suffered a fatal accident during a failed go-around procedure Barcelos Airport, transporting 12 tourists who would do sport fishing in the Amazonas and two pilots; there were no survivors.

== Destinations ==
Throughout its history, GENSA has operated in the following destinations:

Base
Future
Terminated

GENSA (General Serviços Aéreos) Destinations:
State	City	Airport	Notes
(Amazonas (Brazilian state)) Amazonas
(Amazonas (Brazilian state)) Amazonas	Manaus	Eduardo Gomes International Airport	Charter opf Petrobras
(Amazonas (Brazilian state)) Amazonas	Porto Urucu	Porto Urucu Airport	Charter opf Petrobras
Mato Grosso
Mato Grosso	Alta Floresta	Piloto Osvaldo Marques Dias Airport	
Mato Grosso	Cuiabá	Marechal Rondon International Airport	
Mato Grosso	Juína	Juína Airport	
Mato Grosso	Matupá	Orlando Villas-Bôas Regional Airport	
Mato Grosso	Nova Mutum	Brig. Eduardo Gomes Airport	
Mato Grosso	Rondonópolis	Maestro Marinho Franco Airport	
Mato Grosso	Sapezal	Fazenda Tucunaré Airport	
Mato Grosso	Sinop	Presidente João Figueiredo Airport	
Mato Grosso	Tangará da Serra	Tangará da Serra Airport	
Mato Grosso do Sul
Mato Grosso do Sul	Bonito	Bonito Airport	
Mato Grosso do Sul	Campo Grande	Campo Grande International Airport	HUB
Mato Grosso do Sul	Corumbá	Corumbá International Airport	
(Paraná (state)) Paraná
(Paraná (state)) Paraná	Foz do Iguaçu	Cataratas International Airport	
Piauí
Piauí	Parnaíba	Pref. Dr. João Silva Filho Airport	opf Voe Piauí
Piauí	Picos	Sen. Helvídio Nunes Airport	opf Voe Piauí
Piauí	São Raimundo Nonato	Serra da Capivara Airport	opf Voe Piauí
Piauí	Teresina	Senador Petrônio Portella Airport	opf Voe Piauí
Rio Grande do Sul
Rio Grande do Sul	Bento Gonçalves	Bento Gonçalves Airport	opf Air Sul
Rio Grande do Sul	Canela/Gramado	Canela Airport	opf Voe CaneLinha
Rio Grande do Sul	Porto Alegre	Salgado Filho International Airport	opf Voe CaneLinha

== Fleet ==
At the time of suspension of operations in April 2019, the GENSA fleet consisted of the following aircraft:

GENSA (General Serviços Aéreos) fleet
Aircraft	Total	Orders	Passengers	Notes
Embraer EMB 110 Bandeirante	1	—	18	Sold to Manaus Aerotáxi in 2019
Embraer EMB 120 Brasilia	2	—	30	All std in Campo Grande

== See also ==
- Manaus Aerotáxi
- Pantanal Linhas Aéreas
- List of airlines of Brazil
