= Manacapuru River =

Coordinates: 3°15′00″S 60°41′30″W

Location
- Country: Brazil

Physical characteristics
- Source
  - location: Amazonas state
- Mouth
  - location: Amazon River (Solimões section)
- Discharge
  - average: 550 m^{3}/s (19,000 cu ft/s)

Manacapuru River is a river of Amazonas state in north-western Brazil. It flows into the Amazon River (Solimões section) at the city of Manacapuru, about 80 km (50 mi) upstream (west) from Manaus. Parts of the river are very broad, appearing as elongated lakes, with the uppermost known as Lago Grande de Manacapuru ("Large Manacapuru Lake") and the lowermost, near where it merges into the Amazon, as Lago Manacapuru ("Lake Manacapuru"). On February 7, 2009, a plane crashed at the river. 24 of the 28 people on board were killed.

== See also ==
- List of rivers of Amazonas
