= Mission Control Space Services =

Canadian aerospace company

- Industry: Aerospace; Artificial Intelligence
- Founded: March 2015
- Founder: Ewan Reid
- Headquarters: 162 Elm Street West; Ottawa, Ontario; K1R 6N5
- Services: Robotics, Autonomous Vehicles, Planetary Rovers, STEM Education & Outreach
- Website: missioncontrolspaceservices.com

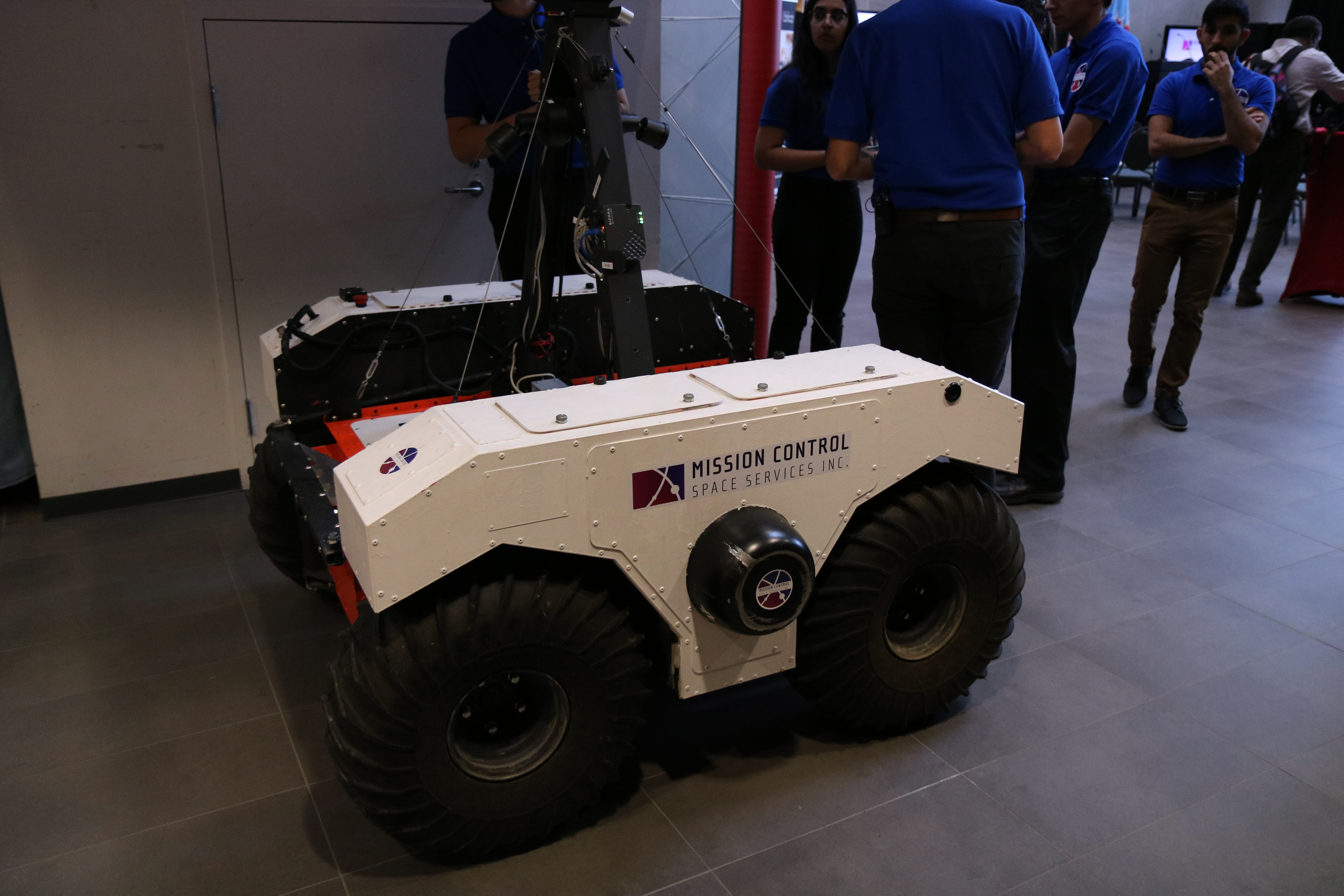
Mission Control Space Service space rover prototype

== Introduction ==
Mission Control Space Services (Mission Control) is a Canadian company that focuses on developing advanced software for space, including AI.

== About ==
Mission Control was founded in 2015 by Ewan Reid. Located in Ottawa, Ontario, is an 8200 square foot facility, including two laboratories, an Orbital Autonomy Lab for autonomous on-orbit robotic operations, a 4000 square foot lunar analogue terrain facility and more. Mission Control was the first in the world to deploy deep learning AI in lunar orbit

== History ==
2015 - Mission Control won its first contract with the Canadian Space Agency to develop ASAS: the Autonomous Soil Assessment System.

2018/2019 - Mission Control secured funding from the Canadian Space Agency through their Lunar Exploration Accelerator Program (LEAP) for the development of an operations and autonomy framework for upcoming lunar exploration missions. Mission Control's Spacefarer software was prepared to help guide the Rashid Lunar Rover, a component of the Emirates Lunar Mission, scheduled to launch on a SpaceX Falcon 9 rocket in 2022.

2023 - M1 of the Emirates Lunar Mission did not successfully land. Although this was upsetting for the Mission Control team, the company is now the first organization in the world to deploy deep-learning Artificial Intelligence (AI) in lunar orbit.
