= Asas Linhas Aéreas =

Brazilian cargo airline

ASAS Linhas Aéreas
IATA	ICAO	Call sign
—	CEU	ASAS AIR
- Founded: 2020; 6 years ago
- Ceased operations: 2020, never flew carrying cargo
- Hubs: São José dos Campos Airport
- Fleet size: 1
- Headquarters: São José dos Campos, Brazil
- Key people: Orlando Menezes Silva (CEO); José Antônio Baptista (COO); Hélio Oliveira (CMO)
- Founders: Orlando Menezes Silva
- Website: www.voeasas.com

Asas Linhas Aéreas, stylized as ASAS Linhas Aéreas, was a Brazilian startup cargo airline headquartered in São José dos Campos, São Paulo. The airline was founded in 2020 and is currently in the final phase of certification with the National Civil Aviation Agency of Brazil (ANAC).

== History ==
=== Background ===
The process of creating the new airline dates back to 2016, when a group of former employees from several Brazilian airlines, such as Varig and VASP, led by Orlando Menezes Silva, decided to create ASAS Linhas Aéreas to enter the Brazilian domestic market. The process, however, remained dormant until mid-2019, when it moved forward again, transferring its headquarters to São José dos Campos, in São Paulo.

=== Establishment ===
The creation of ASAS Linhas Aéreas began to take shape in May 2020, when the new airline announced the hiring of pilots with experience in the Boeing 727. Later, in June, it registered with the ANAC the aeronautical registration and ownership of its first plane, the Boeing 727-200F reg. PR-IOC (MSN 22984), previously operated by Rio Linhas Aéreas and Sideral Linhas Aéreas.

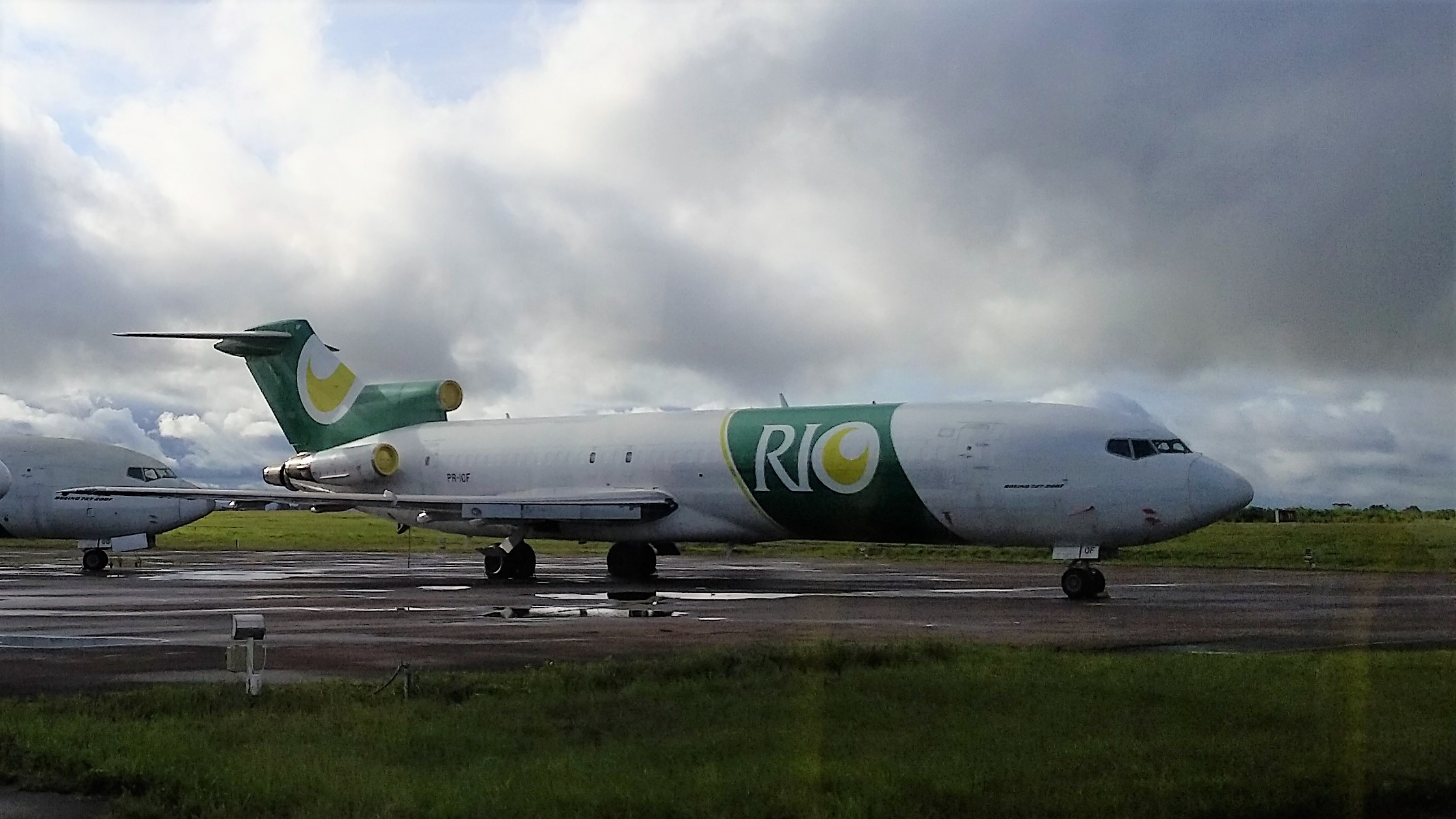
Former RIO Linhas Aéreas Boeing 727-200F stored in Curitiba

On January 7, 2021, the chief executive officer (CEO) of ASAS Linhas Aéreas, Orlando Menezes Silva, accompanied by the pilot José Antônio Baptista, chief operating officer (COO), and Hélio Oliveira, chief maintenance officer (CMO), officially presented the project to create the newest Brazilian cargo airline. According to them, the airline's intention was to begin operations in March of the same year, as soon as its first Boeing 727 was airworthy again and ready to return to the skies after completing a heavy maintenance process (C-Check).

Between January 15 and November 9, 2021, the aircraft remained undergoing maintenance at Afonso Pena International Airport, in Curitiba, where it had been stored for a few years after the bankruptcy of its owner. The entire maintenance process was shared by ASAS Linhas Aéreas through its social networks, updating the public on the progress of work on the Boeing 727, given the great expectation of seeing it fly again.

==== Partnership with Americanas ====
In October 2021 ASAS Linhas Aéreas entered into a partnership with the Brazilian holding company Americanas, one of the largest retail and e-commerce companies in the country, to transport goods between distribution centers in São Paulo, Recife and Salvador da Bahia, from the hub at São José dos Campos Airport. To celebrate the partnership, the first ASAS Boeing 727, which was in Curitiba in the final phase of maintenance, received a special livery with the retailer's logo.

On November 9, 2021, the Boeing 727 registration PR-IOC in Americanas livery was officially delivered to ASAS Linhas Aéreas, flying between Curitiba and the airline's headquarters in São José dos Campos, where it was received with a water salute in an event that was attended by airline and retailer executives, press and local authorities. At the time, the airline presented its plans to incorporate two more aircraft of the model during 2022, including the possibility of one of them being configured in the passenger version for charter flights.

On November 30, 2021, the company changed plans and decided to send the Boeing 727 for heavy maintenance (5C-Check) and painting in the JH Aviation hangar located at Brasília International Airport. Initially, the airline's intention was to carry it out in São José dos Campos, at DIGEX MRO, but due to the high demand for maintenance and painting of other aircraft, the process would take longer than expected.

==== Problems and delays with Boeing 727 maintenance ====
The Boeing 727 reg. PR-IOC remained parked for around six months in one of the remote positions on the apron at Brasília International Airport, waiting for maintenance work to begin, which included complete disassembly, starting only in May 2022. The initial forecast was that the process would last around two months, but it constantly suffered from delays.

In February 2023, without having completed the maintenance work, the aircraft was removed from the hangar with parts removed, according to ASAS Linhas Aéreas, due to non-compliance with the contract by the company contracted for the maintenance service. Since June 2023, the aircraft has remained abandoned in Brasília, with parts removed and the engines covered with plastic; its future is completely uncertain, but according to experts, it is unlikely that, given such conditions, it will be able to fly again.

To further complicate the situation for ASAS Linhas Aéreas, its partner Americanas announced the discovery of accounting "inconsistencies" of 20 billion reais ($3.88 billion) on their balance sheet, creating an unprecedented crisis in the Brazilian retail sector. After the incident, the company CEO Sergio Rial resigned, with the company filing for bankruptcy on January 19, 2023. On January 25, 2023, Americanas declared bankruptcy in the United States, starting a recovery plan to renegotiate its debts with creditors and restructure its business model, which did not include maintaining the partnership with the airline.

==== Change of plans ====
On January 5, 2024, after uncertainty about its future due to problems with the maintenance of its unique airplane B727 and the bankruptcy of its main partner, ASAS Linhas Aéreas appeared to have changed its plans and strategy to possibly begin its operations, which never happened. Through the Brazilian Aeronautical Registration (RAB) system, the airline reserved the PS-WIN registration for a Boeing 737-300SF (MSN 27713). In addition to the aforementioned Boeing 737 Classic, the airline also had a PS-OMS registration reservation, the initial of its founder's name, Orlando Menezes Silva, for another Boeing 727-200F, serial number 22462. Other plans were not realistic and were abandoned.

The unique B727 is still abandoned at Coordinates 15°52'8.53"S 47°56'0.50"W and never flown carrying cargo or in business.

== Fleet ==
As of August 2025, Asas Linhas Aéreas operates the following aircraft:

ASAS Linhas Aéreas Fleet
Aircraft	Out Service	Orders	Passengers	Note
Boeing 727-200F	1		Cargo	Stored at Brasília International Airport
TOTAL	1		Cargo	

== See also ==
- List of defunct airlines of Brazil
