= Voepass =

Brazilian airline (1995–2025)

VOEPASS Linhas Aéreas
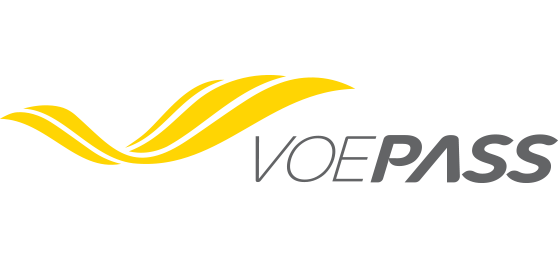
IATA	ICAO	Call sign
2Z	PTB	PASSAREDO
- Founded: 1995; 31 years ago
- Commenced operations: July 3, 1995; 31 years ago
- Ceased operations: June 24, 2025; 15 months ago
- Hubs: Ribeirão Preto
- Subsidiaries: MAP Linhas Aéreas
- Fleet size: 10 (as of May 2025)
- Destinations: none
- Headquarters: Ribeirão Preto, Brazil
- Key people: José Luiz Felício Filho (CEO & President)
- Founders: José Luiz Felício
- Employees: few (as of May 2025)
- Website: web.archive.org/web/20230111215452/https://www.voepass.com.br/empresa/site/

Voepass Linhas Aéreas, stylized as VOEPASS Linhas Aéreas, was an airline based in Ribeirão Preto, São Paulo, Brazil. It was formed by Passaredo Linhas Aéreas and MAP Linhas Aéreas. It operated regional services in Brazil. Its main base was Leite Lopes Airport, Ribeirão Preto. According to the National Civil Aviation Agency (ANAC), between January and December 2023, VOEPASS Linhas Aéreas carried 737,928 passengers and had 0.3% of the domestic market share of revenue passenger kilometres (RPK), making it the fourth-largest domestic airline in Brazil. On March 11, 2025, Brazilian National Civil Aviation Agency (ANAC) suspended all operations due to "non-conformities related to the company's management systems provided for in regulations." This was announced in a Press Release on ANAC's webpage. On March 12, 2025, LATAM Airlines terminated its codeshare agreement. Brazil's Ministry of Justice and Public Security issued a press release stating that the decision was taken after the company failed to correct flaws in its management systems and comes months after a fatal accident in Vinhedo-SP.

On June 24, 2025, the Brazilian National Civil Aviation Agency (ANAC) made the decision to permanently revoke the airline's Air Operator Certificate (AOC), effectively grounding the company and leading to its immediate shutdown. The reason for the decision was cited as repeated safety violations and systemic failures.

== History ==
=== Passaredo Transportes Aéreos (1995–2002) ===
==== Establishment ====
Oldest Passaredo logo

Founded by businessman José Luiz Felício, owner of the bus company Viação Passaredo and father of the airline's current president, José Luiz Felício Filho, Passaredo Transportes Aéreos began operations on July 3, 1995, with two Embraer EMB-120 Brasília, connecting cities such as Ribeirão Preto, Teresina, Goiânia, Brasília, São Paulo, Curitiba, São José dos Campos, Belo Horizonte and Vitória da Conquista. With the success of the flights, the company leased a third plane of the same model to reinforce its operations.

In 1997, Passaredo introduced into service a twin-aisle Airbus A310-300 with capacity for 244 passengers, becoming the first Brazilian airline to operate it, followed by a second aircraft to operate on domestic tourist charter flights to destinations in the Northeast and international in the Caribbean.

Incorporated two ATR-42-300 turboprops to modernize and expand its fleet, replacing its three Embraer aircraft. Short after, they were returned to leasing companies less than two years after being put into operation, due to the "Samba Effect", a financial crisis that affected Brazil in 1999 and resulted in a strong devaluation of the real, the national currency.

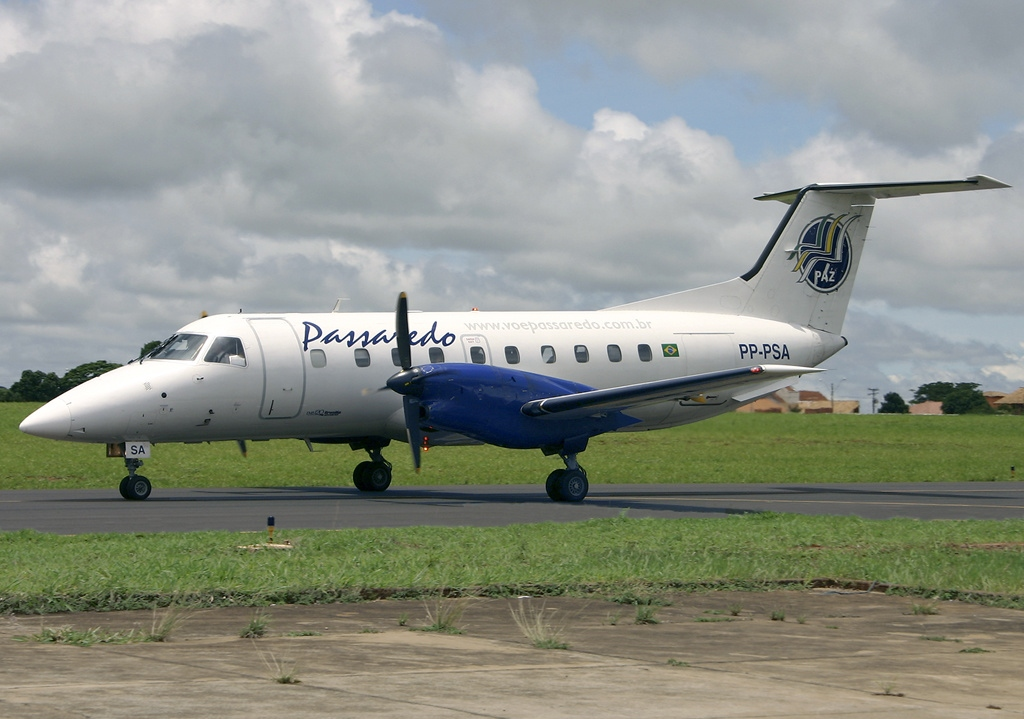
Embraer EMB-120 Brasília reg. PP-PSA, the first Passaredo aircraft, in 2006

==== 2000s ====
On April 4, 2002, due to financial difficulties, Passaredo announced the suspension of all its flights with immediate effect for an indefinite period, grounding its fleet made up solely of the two Embraer aircraft acquired in 1997.

=== Return to Passaredo Linhas Aéreas (2004–2019) ===
In March 2004, the airline split from the Passaredo Group, owner of Viação Passaredo. The airline returned to operations under the name Passaredo Linhas Aéreas, with one of the two EMB-120 Brasília aircraft that had been grounded two years earlier. Some time later, the second plane was reactivated and another four Brasília were incorporated into the fleet, which began to be replaced by Embraer jets from April 2009.

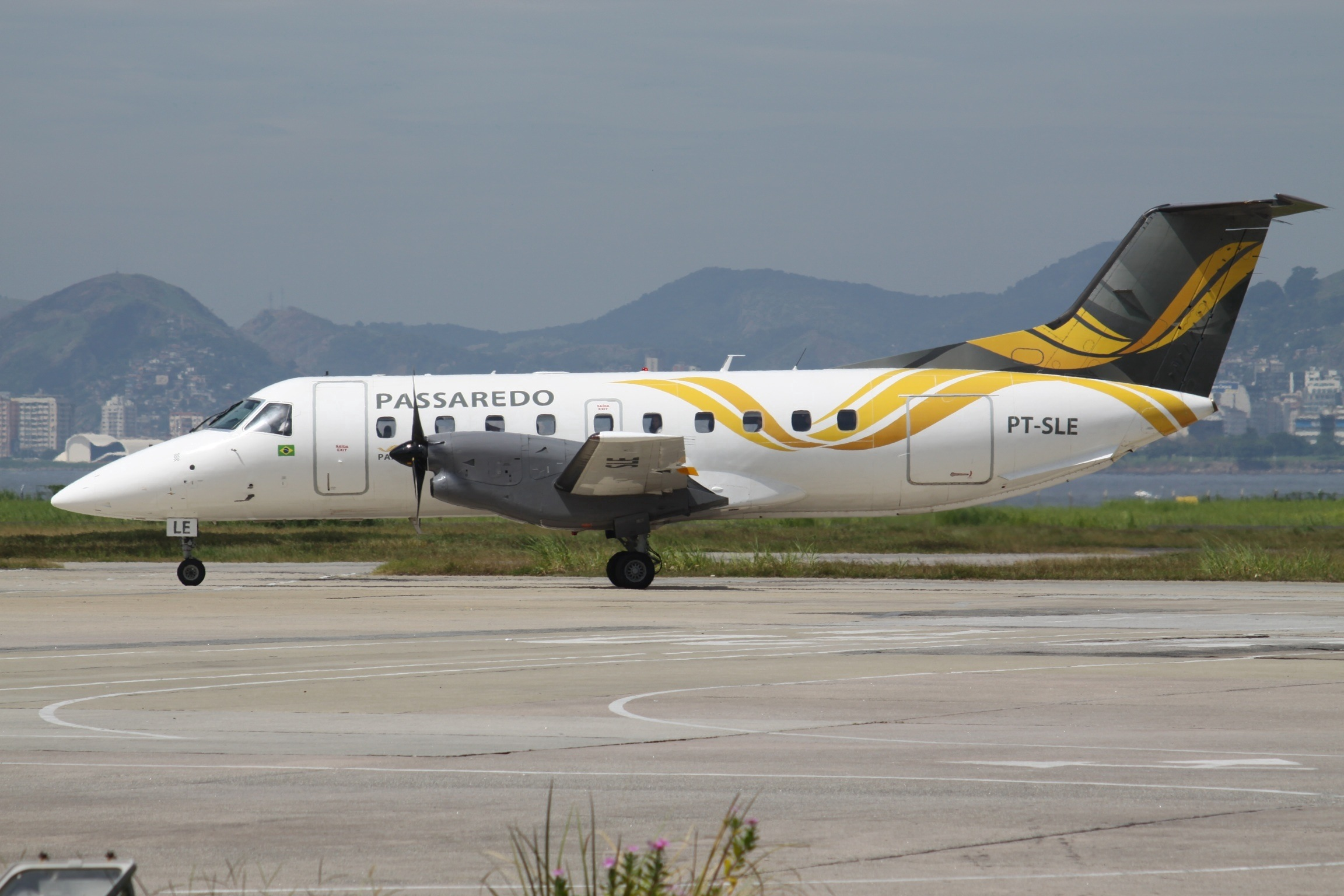
PT-SLE showing Passaredo's new visual identity in 2008

In 2008, Passaredo revealed a different visual identity and an ambitious route plan and fleet expansion, announcing the acquisition of five Embraer ERJ-145, with a capacity for 50 seats. The second-hand planes were leased directly from Embraer, with the first delivery scheduled for April 2009.

In 2009, Passaredo opened routes to Rio de Janeiro, São Paulo, Porto Alegre, Palmas, Bauru, Marília, Barreiras, Presidente Prudente, Goiânia and Recife. With this, the company more than doubled the number of seats available and consolidated itself as the second largest regional company in Brazil.

==== 2010s ====
In 2010, the airline received an ERJ-135 to expand its network. On April 29, 2011, it retired the last three EMB-120 turboprops, but stopped flying to Marília, Bauru and Presidente Prudente, claiming that the ERJ-145s were too large for the demand on these routes.

From 2010 until 2014, Passaredo had an operational partnership with GOL Linhas Aéreas, replacing an earlier similar agreement with TAM Airlines (LATAM Airlines). In 2014, re-established an operational partnership with TAM (LATAM).

On May 23, 2012, Passaredo acquired 10 ATR 72-600 aircraft, with the option to purchase ten more. Started operations of the first of six ATR 72-500 leased.

Passaredo applied to the Commercial Bankruptcy and Reorganization Court in Ribeirão Preto on October 19, 2012, for the commencement of "judicial reorganization" proceedings pursuant to the New Bankruptcy and Restructuring Law of Brazil (Law 11.101). Operations continue as normal.

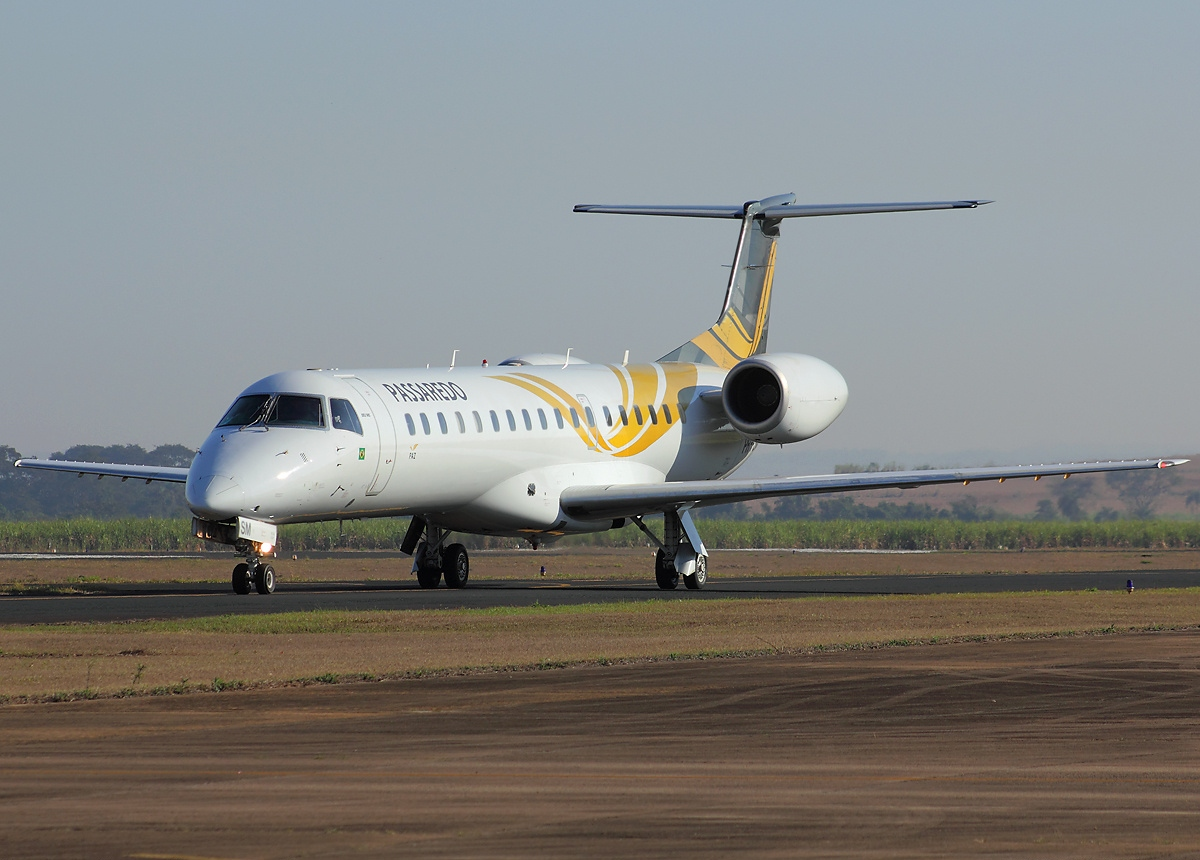
Embraer ERJ-145 reg. PR-PSM taxiing in August 2011

After filed for bankruptcy protection, the airline retired the Embraer regional jets due to the high cost of operation and maintenance, standardizing its fleet with ATR 72 turboprops, for being more economical with great seating capacity and suitable for operations at airports with limited infrastructure.

In the year 2014, along with Avianca Brasil, Passaredo was considered the safest of Brazil in a ranking of AirlineRatings.com, receiving seven star rating. The staff evaluated 449 airlines to security criteria. A total of 149 evaluated airlines got seven stars, the highest score.

==== Partnership with GOL Linhas Aéreas ====
In January 2017, Passaredo re-established operational partnership with GOL Linhas Aéreas. The airline maintained partnership with LATAM.

On July 3, 2017, company was sold to Viação Itapemirim and on August 24 emerges from bankruptcy, but on September 11, 2017, resigned the sale to Itapemirim for breach of contract.

=== Rebranding to VOEPASS Linhas Aéreas (2019–2024) ===
In June 2019, GOL Linhas Aéreas and Passaredo expanded their commercial relationship through a Capacity Purchase Agreement (CPA), with the airline operating regional flights on behalf of GOL, initially connecting the hub at Brasília International Airport with São José do Rio Preto, Araguaína and Barreiras. Over the years, the agreement was expanded, with Passaredo operating up to 14 destinations on flights marketed exclusively by GOL, but operated by Passaredo planes and crew.

==== Acquisition of MAP Linhas Aéreas ====
On August 21, 2019, Passaredo purchased MAP Linhas Aéreas, including 12 slots at São Paulo Congonhas Airport granted to MAP on August 14. Passaredo was granted 14 slots, to build its own network, focusing on markets underserved. Both companies operated independently but were merged. On the same day Passaredo also announced the change of its name to VOEPASS Linhas Aéreas.

==== 2020s ====
On June 8, 2021, GOL Linhas Aéreas purchased MAP Linhas Aéreas from VOEPASS for R$120 million (US$25.4 million). Transaction included 26 slots at São Paulo Congonhas Airport belonging to MAP and VOEPASS.

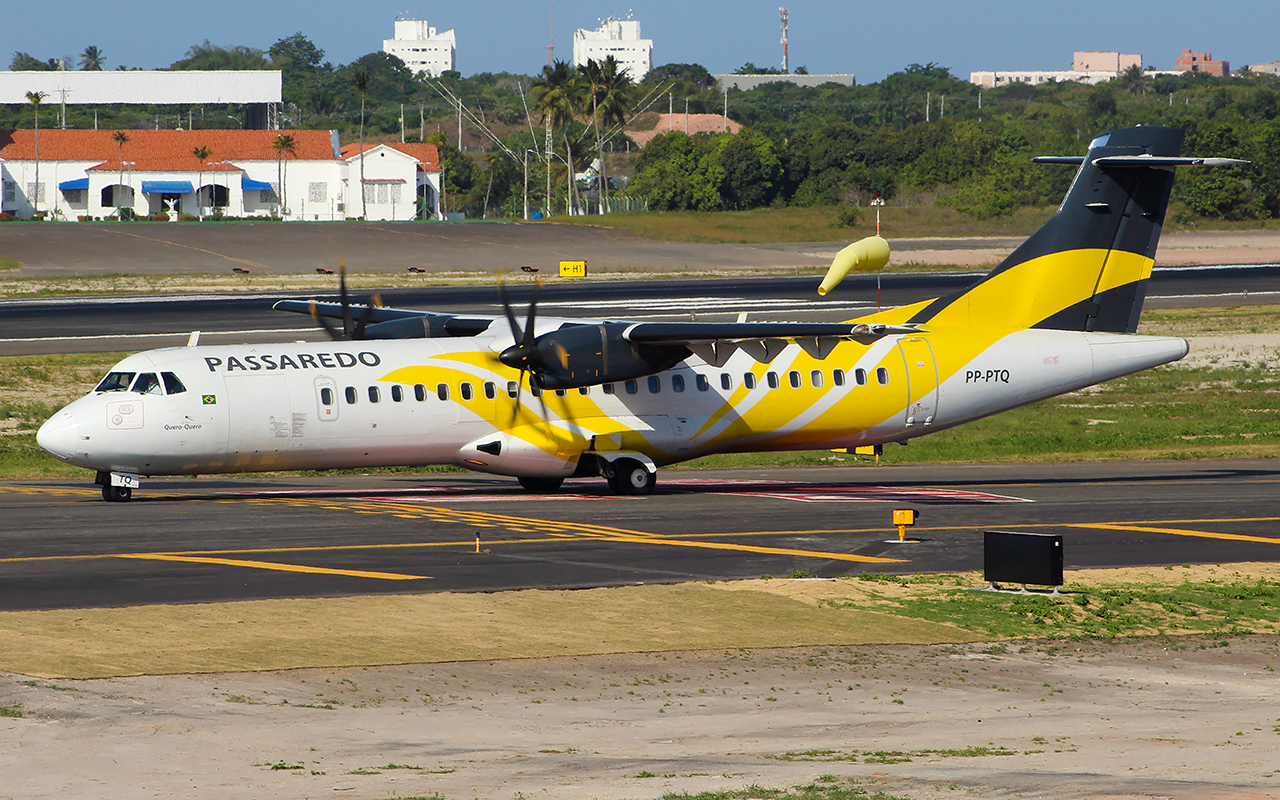
Passaredo's ATR 72-500 taxiing for takeoff in Salvador

On November 3, 2022, the airline became a member of the International Air Transport Association. Two days later, on November 5, 2022, it joined the Latin American & Caribbean Air Transport Association (ALTA).

In April 2023, after ANAC released a new regulatory model the previous year that allowed airlines to sell slots without the need for an M&A agreement, GOL reversed its agreement to acquire MAP Linhas Aéreas, acquiring only the slots at São Paulo Congonhas Airport. Thus, VOEPASS continued to hold all MAP operations, including its air operator certificate, fleet and routes in Manaus.

In April 2023, GOL Linhas Aéreas and VOEPASS finalized their commercial agreements (CPA) effective May 9, 2023, resulting in the suspension of numerous destinations operated by VOEPASS. Between June 2019 and April 2023, the regional airline served up to 14 destinations on behalf of GOL in all regions of Brazil. On the same day, the company announced the expansion of a codeshare agreement with LATAM Airlines.

==== Partnership with LATAM Airlines ====
On April 11, 2023, LATAM Airlines started ticket sales to 13 regional destinations operated by VOEPASS, namely Ipatinga, Barreiras, Feira de Santana, Valença, Paulo Afonso, Teixeira de Freitas, Lençóis, Fernando de Noronha, Uruguaiana, Santa Maria, Pelotas, Santo Ângelo and Aracati, in addition to Coari, Carauari, Parintins, Itaituba and Parnaíba, operated by MAP Linhas Aéreas on behalf of VOEPASS.

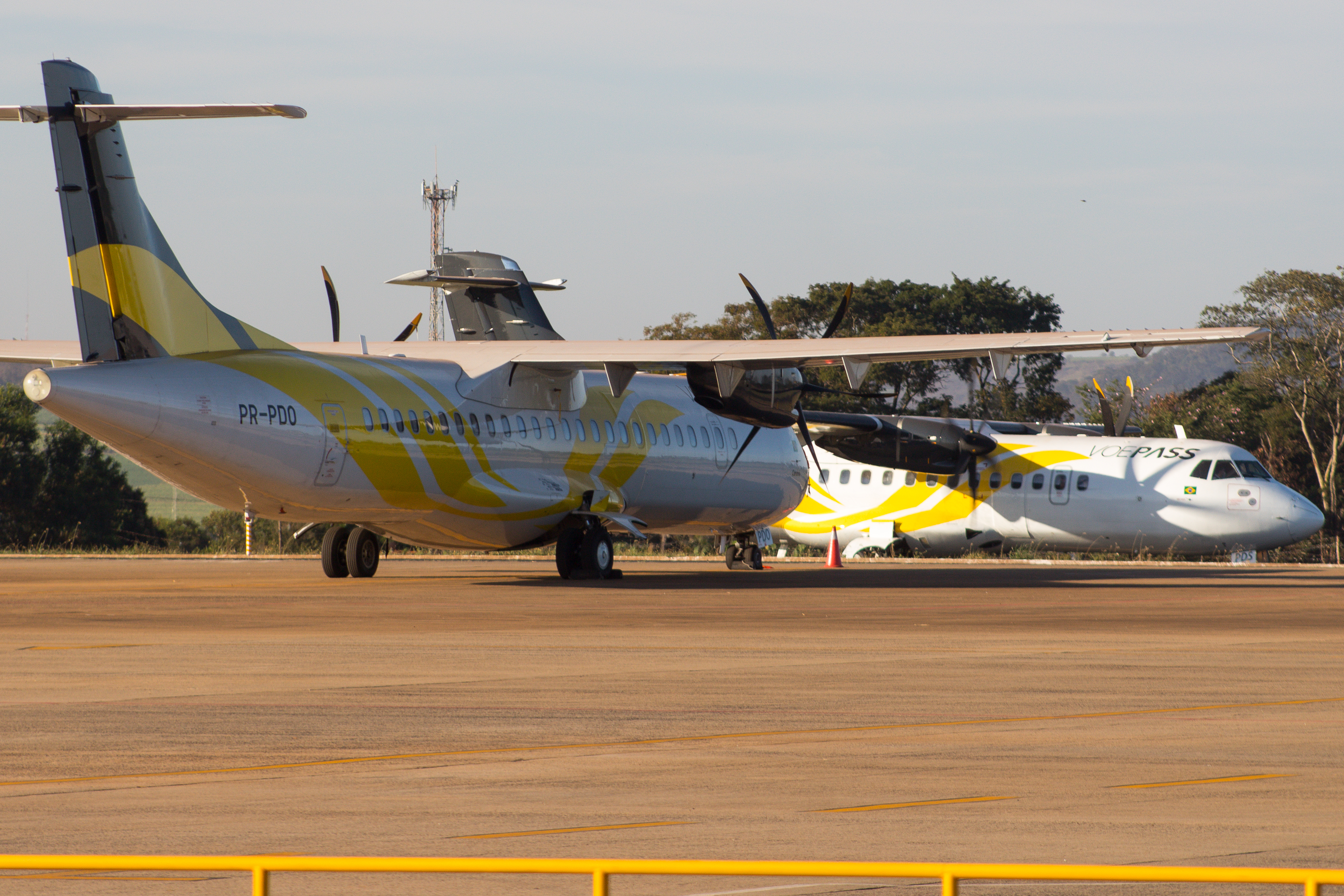
ATR 72-600 reg. PR-PDO with the new commercial name VOEPASS after rebranding

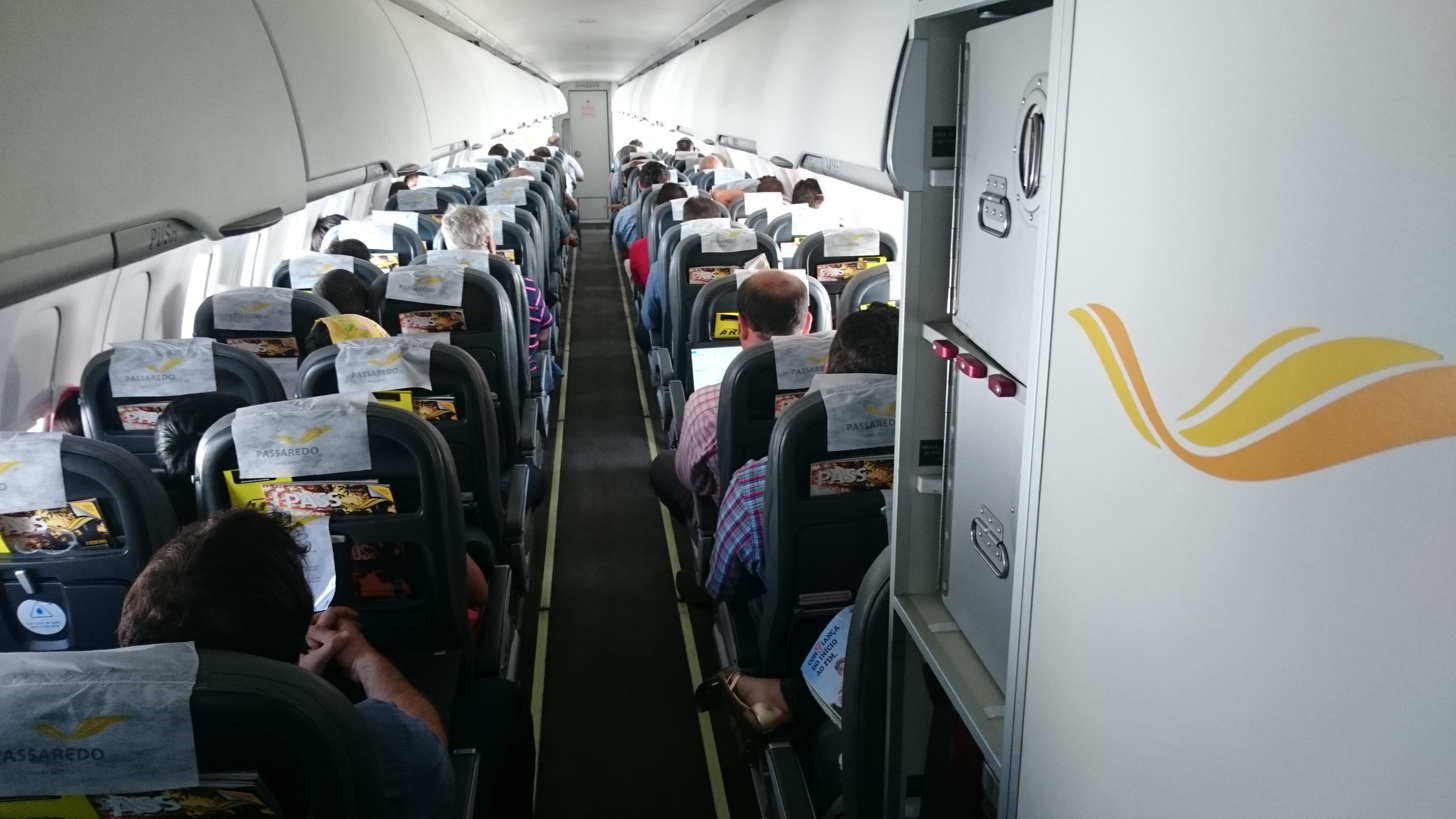
Passenger cabin of a Passaredo ATR 72-600

On September 20, 2023, tour operator CVC announced an exclusive partnership with VOEPASS Linhas Aéreas to launch exclusive flights from Belo Horizonte/Confins, Uberlândia, Rio de Janeiro/Santos Dumont, São José do Rio Preto, Bauru, Vitória and Brasília, mainly heading to destinations in the Northeast region, such as Porto Seguro, Ilhéus and Ilha de Comandatuba, in addition to Caldas Novas, the largest hydro-thermal resort in the world. VOEPASS Linhas Aéreas forecasts the availability of 70 thousand seats between December 2023 and February 2024; the operation will also continue for the following 12 months, with availability until March 2025, the airline said.

On February 21, 2024, launched six destinations from March 31, namely Cascavel, Caxias do Sul, Florianópolis, Maringá, Presidente Prudente and Rio Verde. The flights were sold by the airline itself and also through LATAM Airlines sales channels, operated through code-share between the two companies.

==== Acquisition by LATAM Airlines not realized ====
On March 14, 2024, the Fortaleza-based newspaper Diário do Nordeste announced, citing airline industry sources, that LATAM Airlines had acquired VOEPASS Linhas Aéreas to expand its operations in secondary and regional markets. The acquisition announcement, according to the newspaper, would be made by the two airlines during a Brazilian government event to launch a regional aviation incentive program. Rumors increased with the publication of a Concentration Act in the Official Diary of the Union (DOU), the official journal of the federal government of Brazil, requested by the airlines, of an operation such as "acquisition of shares without acquisition of control". Later, LATAM Airlines went public to clarify the information, signalling that it had not acquired the regional airline, but that it submitted to the Administrative Council for Economic Defense (CADE), a Brazilian antitrust body, the request to carry out a support operation financial support to VOEPASS Linhas Aéreas to optimize its slots to expand flight and destination options in the Brazilian airline market, with a possible future minority stake in VOEPASS just as one of the guarantee options for this operation. The giant Latin American airline, but did not provide details on how this support provided and how slots optimized. Details about the operation later emerged, according to the documents sent to CADE, VOEPASS Linhas Aéreas exchanged ten pairs of airport slot (landing and takeoff times) at Congonhas Airport, in São Paulo, during peak hours, for ten pairs of LATAM Airlines slots at the same terminal, however, at less busy times. In return, VOEPASS issued convertible debentures (debt securities), which, together with purchase options, provided LATAM with the right to convert its investment into up to 30% of the shares of VOEPASS and its subsidiary MAP Linhas Aéreas.

=== Suspended ===
Following the crash of Flight 2283 on August 9, 2024, Voepass came under the scrutiny of the media and public opinion. As a result, it began a restructuring process throughout its operational structure, from the reformulation of the flight network and the suspension of destinations, to the change of executives. On September 25, 2024, after several questions related to maintenance problems reported, VOEPASS laid off directors of Operational Safety, Maintenance and Operations. The company's president and co-founder, José Luiz Felício Filho, assumed as chief executive officer (CEO) and Chief Operating Officer (COO), while Eduardo Busch, former CEO, assumed the position of Chief Legal Officer (CLO). Subsequently, less than a month later, Busch was fired from the airline. On November 7, 2024, VOEPASS suspended to sale tickets to its own destinations through its website, launching a route network that only included destinations sold exclusively by LATAM Airlines through a Capacity Purchase Agreement (CPA), in addition to its contract for the transportation of employees of the state-owned company Petrobras in the state of Amazonas. On March 11, 2025, the National Civil Aviation Agency of Brazil suspended all operating license of Voepass, citing the airline's "inability to solve irregularities identified during the supervision, as well as the violation of previously established conditions for the continuity of the operation within the required safety standards". The National Civil Aviation Agency (ANAC) had applied R$4.4 million in fines against Voepass since 2014. However, the company had only paid R$123 thousand, which corresponded to 2.79% of the total applied, 255 fines were issued. On April 14, 2025, most of its employees were laid off. On April 23, 2025, Voepass filed for bankruptcy protection, blaming financial woes caused by LATAM Airlines, reporting about 209.2 million reais ($36.78 million) in debt caused by the Flight 2283 crash.

On 30 April 2025 Union requested in Justice freezing of Voepass assets to ensure payment of severance pay. It is important to notice that according to the Brazilian legal system (and The Federal Reorganization & Bankruptcy Law), VOEPASS remains in business. Its bankruptcy protection ("concordata" in Portuguese) means time for reorganization. If unsuccessful in this first phase, a full bankruptcy is likely be declared "de officio" by the Federal Judge currently presiding over the case. In Brazil, a "de officio" decision refers to a judicial decision made by a presiding judge acting under a duty or responsibility, rather than at the request or initiative of a party involved in the case. The airline eventually ceased operations on 24 June 2025.

== Fleet ==
=== Current fleet ===
The airline's fleet was made up exclusively of turboprop aircraft from the Italian-French manufacturer ATR. All aircraft are named after birds of the Brazilian fauna. VOEPASS Linhas Aéreas' fleet consists of the following aircraft (as of May 2025):

VOEPASS Linhas Aéreas Fleet
Aircraft	Out of Service	Orders	Passengers	Note
ATR 42-500	2	—	48	All opby MAP Linhas Aéreas
ATR 72-500	8	—	68	Reg. PR-PDT opby MAP Linhas Aéreas
ATR 72-500	8	—	72	Reg. PR-PDT opby MAP Linhas Aéreas
ATR 72-500	8	—	74	Reg. PR-PDT opby MAP Linhas Aéreas
TOTAL	10	—		

=== Gallery ===
Once VOEPASS

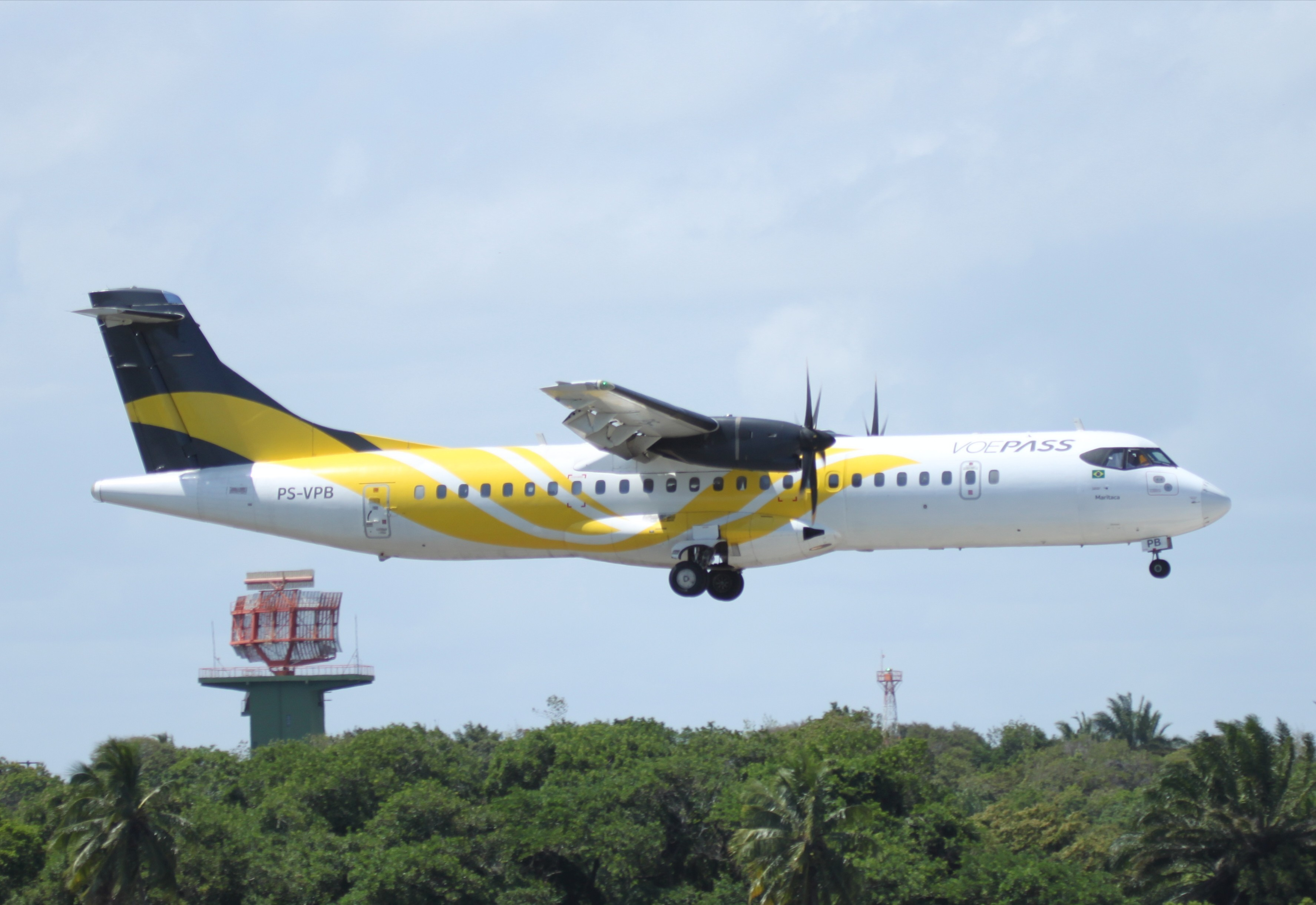
ATR 72-500
This aircraft would later be involved in an accident as Flight 2283.

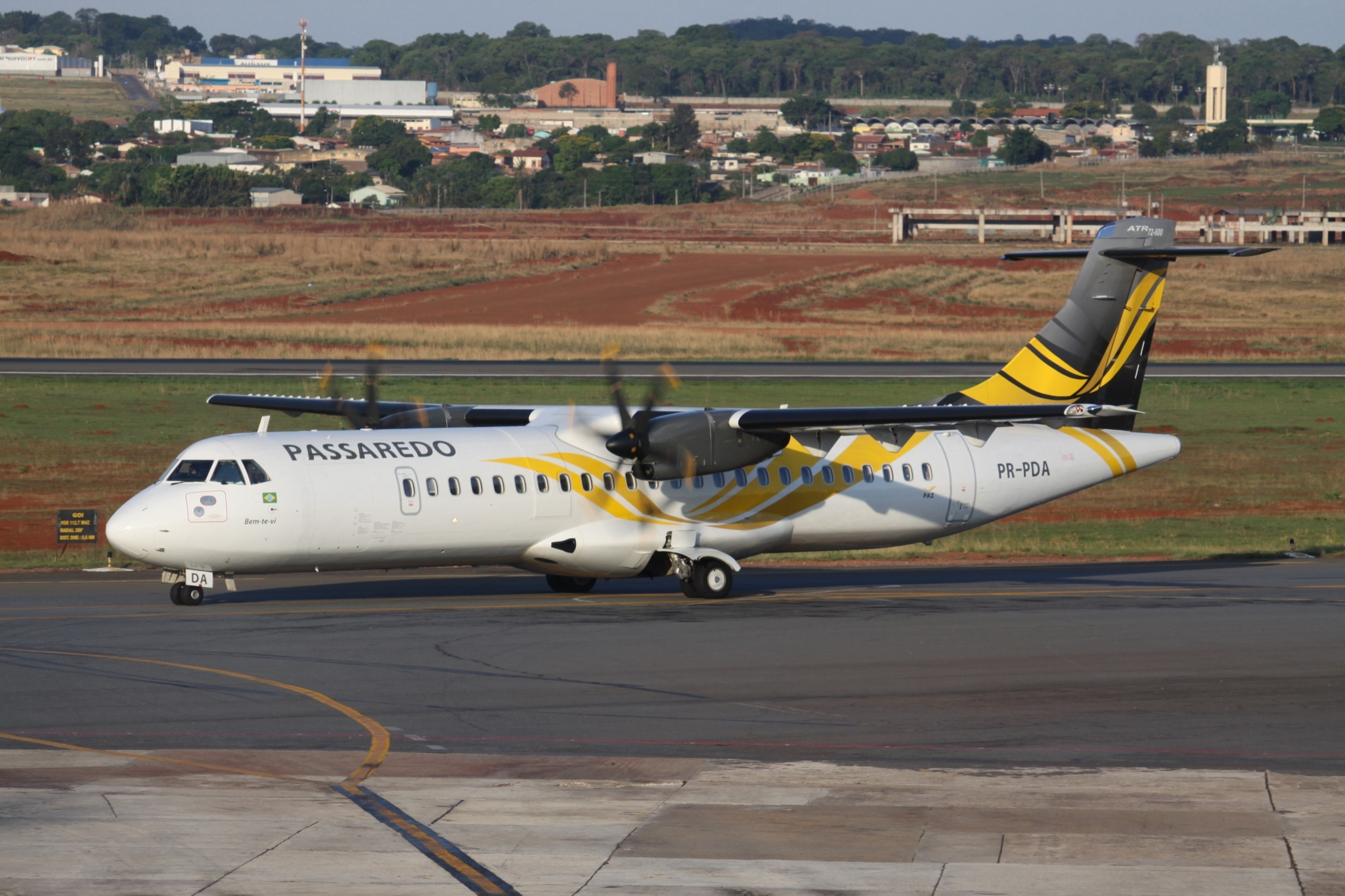
ATR 72-600

=== Former fleet ===
Retired VOEPASS Linhas Aéreas Fleet
Aircraft	Total	Years of operation	Note
Embraer EMB 120ER Brasília	7	1995–2011	
Airbus A310	2	1997–1999	
ATR 42–300	2	1999–2000	
ATR 72–500	1	2022 - 2024	Crashed as Flight 2283
ATR 72-600	4	2022 - 2025	All Returned to England for Lessor
Embraer ERJ 135	1	2009–2010	
Embraer ERJ 145	15	2009–2013	

== Accidents and incidents ==
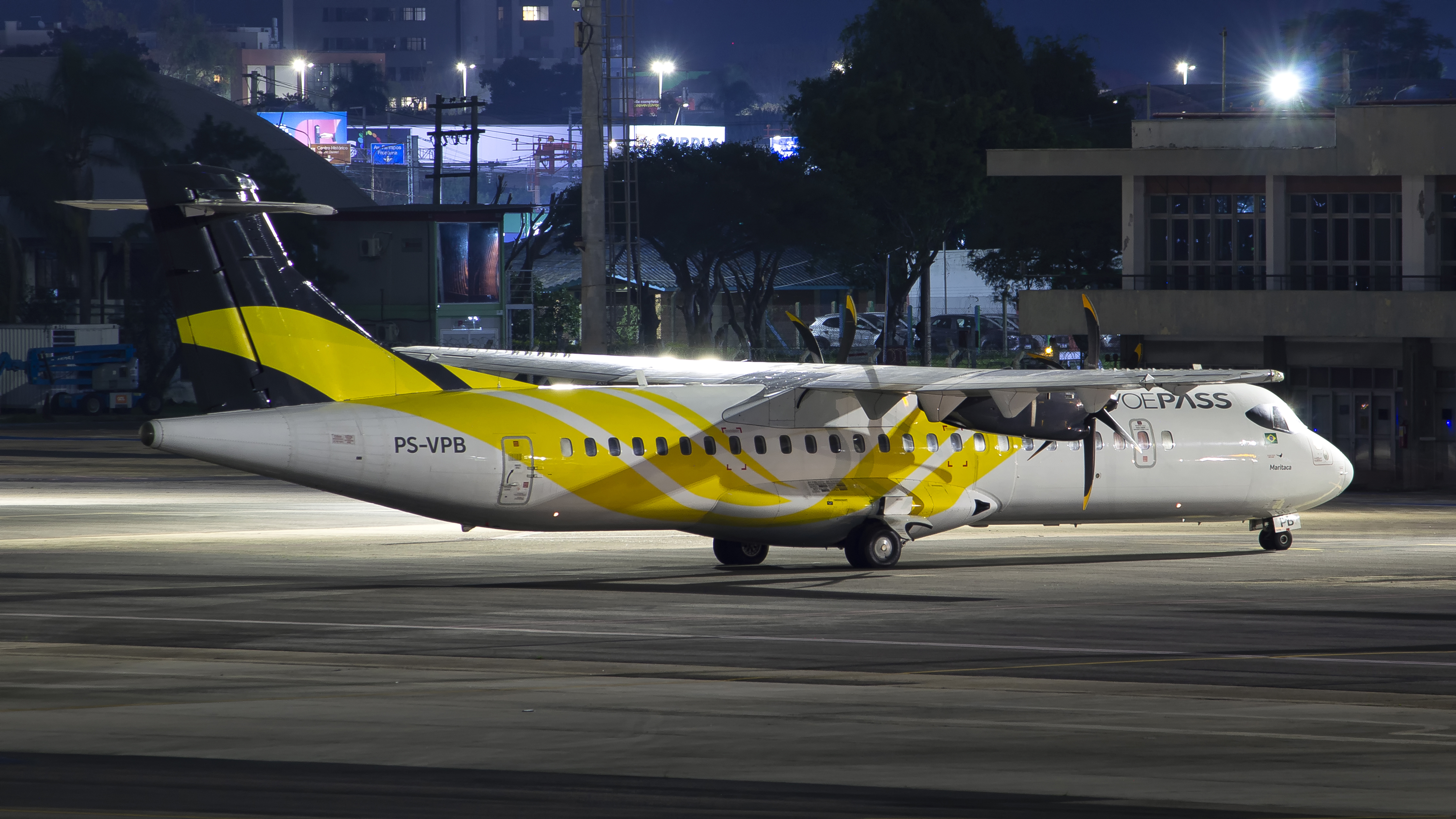
PS-VPB, the aircraft that crashed operating Flight 2283

- On August 25, 2010, Passaredo Linhas Aéreas Flight 2231, operated by an Embraer ERJ-145, crashed on approach to Vitória da Conquista, Bahia. The plane landed short of the runway and the crew lost control, severely damaging the aircraft before it came to a stop away from the runway. Two of the twenty-seven people on board were injured. The airline said the plane was unable to lower landing gear, although observers said the landing gear was down while the aircraft was landing.
- On August 9, 2024, Voepass Flight 2283, operated by an ATR 72-500 (registered as PS-VPB), crashed in the municipality of Vinhedo, São Paulo. All 58 passengers and 4 crew members aboard died. The flight was en route from Cascavel to São Paulo–Guarulhos.The preliminary report from Brazil's Centre for Research and Prevention of Aeronautical Accidents (CENIPA), suggests that a buildup of ice on the plane could have been a significant factor in the crash.

== See also ==
- List of defunct airlines of Brazil
