= Barcelos Airport =

Barcelos Airport Aeroporto de Barcelos
- IATA: BAZ; ICAO: SWBC; LID: AM0017

Summary
- Airport type: Public
- Serves: Barcelos
- Time zone: BRT−1 (UTC−04:00)
- Elevation AMSL: 34 m / 112 ft
- Coordinates: 00°58′52″S 062°55′10″W

Map
- Location in Brazil

Runways
Direction	Length		Surface
Direction	m	ft	Surface
09/27	1,500	4,921	Asphalt
- Sources: ANAC, DECEA

Barcelos Airport (IATA: BAZ, ICAO: SWBC) is the airport serving Barcelos, Brazil.

== Airlines and destinations ==
Airlines	Destinations
Azul Conecta	Manaus

== Accidents and incidents ==
- 16 September 2023: the Manaus Aerotáxi Embraer EMB 110 Bandeirante registration PT-SOG, flying from Manaus to Barcelos crashed upon landing in Barcelos after an aborted landing and an attempt to go-around in heavy rain and bad weather conditions. All 14 passengers and crew died.

== Access ==
The airport is located 2 km (1 mi) from downtown Barcelos.

== See also ==
- List of airports in Brazil
