= Aeronautical Accidents Investigation and Prevention Center =

Brazilian Air Force government agency unit

- Centro de Investigação e Prevenção de Acidentes Aeronáuticos
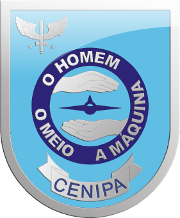

Agency overview
- Formed: 19 November 1971; 54 years ago
- Jurisdiction: Government of Brazil
- Headquarters: SHIS - QI 05, St. de Área Especial Sul, 12 Brasília, Federal District, Brazil
- Agency executive: Lt. Bgd. of the Air Marcelo Moreno, Chairman
- Parent department: Brazilian Air Force
- Website: www2.fab.mil.br/cenipa/

The Aeronautical Accidents Investigation and Prevention Center (Brazilian Portuguese: Centro de Investigação e Prevenção de Acidentes Aeronáuticos, CENIPA) is a unit of the Brazilian Air Force that investigates aviation accidents and incidents in Brazil. It is headquartered in Brasília.

Space accidents are investigated by the Space Activities Accident Investigation and Prevention System (Brazilian Portuguese: Sistema de Investigação e Prevenção de Acidentes em Atividades Espaciais, SIPAE).

== See also ==
- Gol Transportes Aéreos Flight 1907
- TAM Airlines Flight 3054
- 2009 Manaus Aerotáxi Embraer Bandeirante crash
- Noar Linhas Aéreas Flight 4896
- Voepass Flight 2283
