= Rico Linhas Aéreas =

Brazilian regional airline

IATA	ICAO	Call sign
C7	RLE	RICO
- Founded: 1 November 1996
- Ceased operations: 1 June 2010
- Hubs: Eduardo Gomes International Airport
- Headquarters: Manaus, Brazil
- Key people: Átila Yurtsever, Bastian Bartoli, Metin Yurtsever, Omer Yurtsever

Rico Linhas Aéreas S/A was a Brazilian regional airline with its headquarters at Eduardo Gomes International Airport in Manaus, Brazil. It was authorized to operate scheduled passenger and cargo services in the Amazon region.

== History ==
=== Origins ===
Rico Linhas Aéreas was authorized to operate as a regional carrier in 1996, but its history is much older, beginning with Munur Yurtsever, a fighter pilot born in Skopje, then part of Yugoslavia. Due to political reasons he migrated to Turkey and looking for better opportunities he moved to Brazil. In 1957 he established himself in Nova Xavantina, Mato Grosso. The locals, not being able to pronounce his name, nicknamed him Mickey.

In Nova Xavantina he worked as an airplane mechanic but in no time bought an aircraft and started to fly in the region. The operations consisted of transportation of cargo to gold-mining locations of the region using small aircraft. In 1965 and the business partner Apolonildo Brito started a small charter and air taxi company called Táxi Aéreo Rondônia, specialized in flying to gold-mining centers of Rondônia and headquartered in Porto Velho. During the construction of the Trans-Amazonian highway, the company changed its headquarters to Manaus, and provided air services to the big construction companies that were building the highway. The partnership ended in 1969 and on the same year Yurtsever created RICO – Rondônia Indústria e Comércio Air Taxi. In 1980 RICO merged with Táxi Aéreo Rondônia and RICO Táxi Aéreo was born.

From 1974 to 1986 RICO Táxi Aéreo maintained a contract with Petrobras to provide air-transportation while it was searching for oil and natural gas in the Amazonian region. At that time, RICO operated 51 Douglas DC-3s being the largest private operator of this type of aircraft in the world at that time.

On November 1, 1996, while maintaining its independent air taxi operations, the owners of RICO Táxi Aéreo created Rico Linhas Aéreas,a regional scheduled airline.

=== Regional Airline ===
In 2005 Rico Linhas Aéreas was the largest regional carrier in Brazil serving Acre, Amazonas, Pará, and Rondônia.

However the 2008 economic crisis forced Rico to dramatically downsize its operations: between January and September 2008, Rico cancelled 90% of its operations reducing its participation to 0.02% of the market, operating only within the state of Amazonas.

Rico Linhas Aéreas temporarily suspended all scheduled flights as of 1 June 2010 for a major operational restructuring. Charter operations however continued. On 7 June 2011 the National Civil Aviation Agency of Brazil revoked its operational license. RICO Táxi Aéreo however remained operative.

== Destinations ==
Rico Linhas Aéreas operated services to the following destinations:

State	City	Airport	Notes	Refs
Pará	Altamira	Altamira Airport		
Amazonas	Barcelos	Barcelos Airport		
Pará	Belém	Val-de-Cans/Júlio Cezar Ribeiro International Airport		
Roraima	Boa Vista	Atlas Brasil Cantanhede International Airport		
Amazonas	Boca do Acre			
Amazonas	Borba	Borba Airport		
Amazonas	Carauari	Carauari Airport		
Amazonas	Coari	Coari Airport		
Rondônia	Costa Marques			
Acre	Cruzeiro do Sul	Cruzeiro do Sul International Airport		
Amazonas	Eirunepé	Amaury Feitosa Tomaz Airport		
Amazonas	Fonte Boa	Fonte Boa Airport		
Rondônia	Guajará-Mirim			
Amazonas	Humaitá	Francisco Correa da Cruz Airport		
Pará	Itaituba	Itaituba Airport		
Amazonas	Lábrea	Lábrea Airport		
Amazonas	Manaus	Eduardo Gomes International Airport		
Amazonas	Manicoré	Manicoré Airport		
Amazonas	Maués	Maués Airport		
Amazonas	Novo Aripuanã			
Amazonas	Parintins	Júlio Belém Airport		
Rondônia	Porto Velho	Gov. Jorge Teixeira de Oliveira International Airport		
Acre	Rio Branco	Plácido de Castro International Airport		
Amazonas	Santa Isabel do Rio Negro	Tapuruquara Airport		
Pará	Santarém	Maestro Wilson Fonseca Airport		
Amazonas	Santo Antônio do Içá	Ipiranga Airport		
Amazonas	São Gabriel da Cachoeira	São Gabriel da Cachoeira Airport		
Amazonas	São Paulo de Olivença	Sen. Eunice Michiles Airport		
Amazonas	Tabatinga	Tabatinga International Airport		
Acre	Tarauacá	João Galera dos Santos Airport		
Amazonas	Tefé	Pref. Orlando Marinho Airport		
Amazonas	Vila Bittencourt			

== Fleet ==
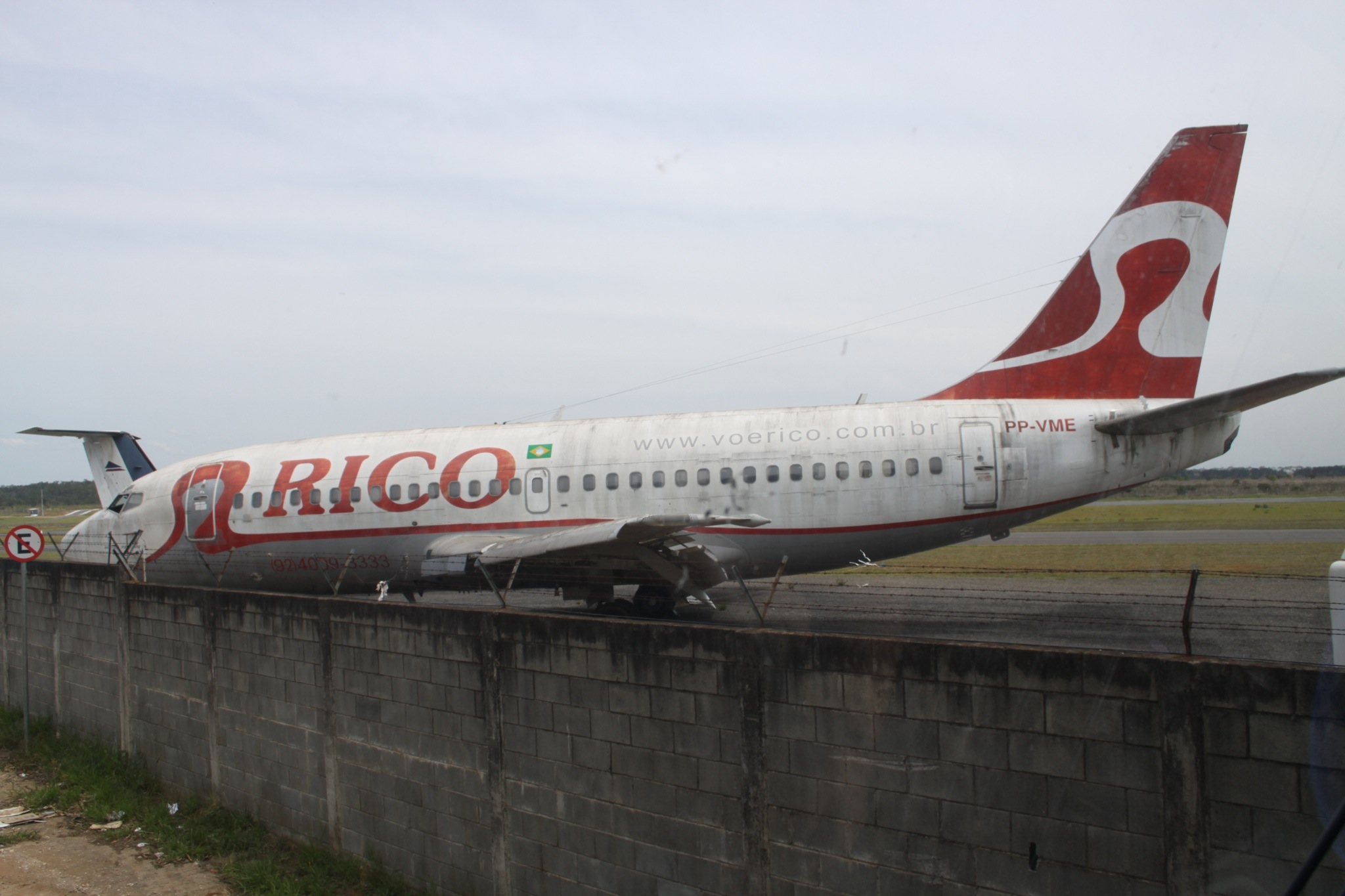
Boeing 737-200

Rico Linhas Aéreas fleet included the following aircraft:

Rico Linhas Aéreas historical fleet
Aircraft	Total	Years of operation	Notes
Embraer EMB 110 Bandeirante	5	1996–2010	
Embraer EMB 120 Brasília	7	1997–2010	
Boeing 737-200	3	2003–2010	
Boeing 737-300QC	1	2006–2007	

== Accidents and incidents ==
- 30 August 2002: flight 4823 operated by the Embraer EMB 120ER Brasília registration PT-WRQ, en route from Cruzeiro do Sul and Tarauacá to Rio Branco crashed on approach to Rio Branco during a rainstorm, 1.5 km short of the runway. Of the 31 passengers and crew aboard, 23 died.
- 14 May 2004: flight 4815 operated by the Embraer EMB 120ER Brasília registration PT-WRO, en route from São Paulo de Olivença and Tefé to Manaus crashed in the forest at about 18 nm from Manaus. All 33 passengers and crew died.

== See also ==
- RICO Táxi Aéreo
- List of defunct airlines of Brazil
