= Tonantins =

Municipality in Amazonas, Brazil

- Municipality
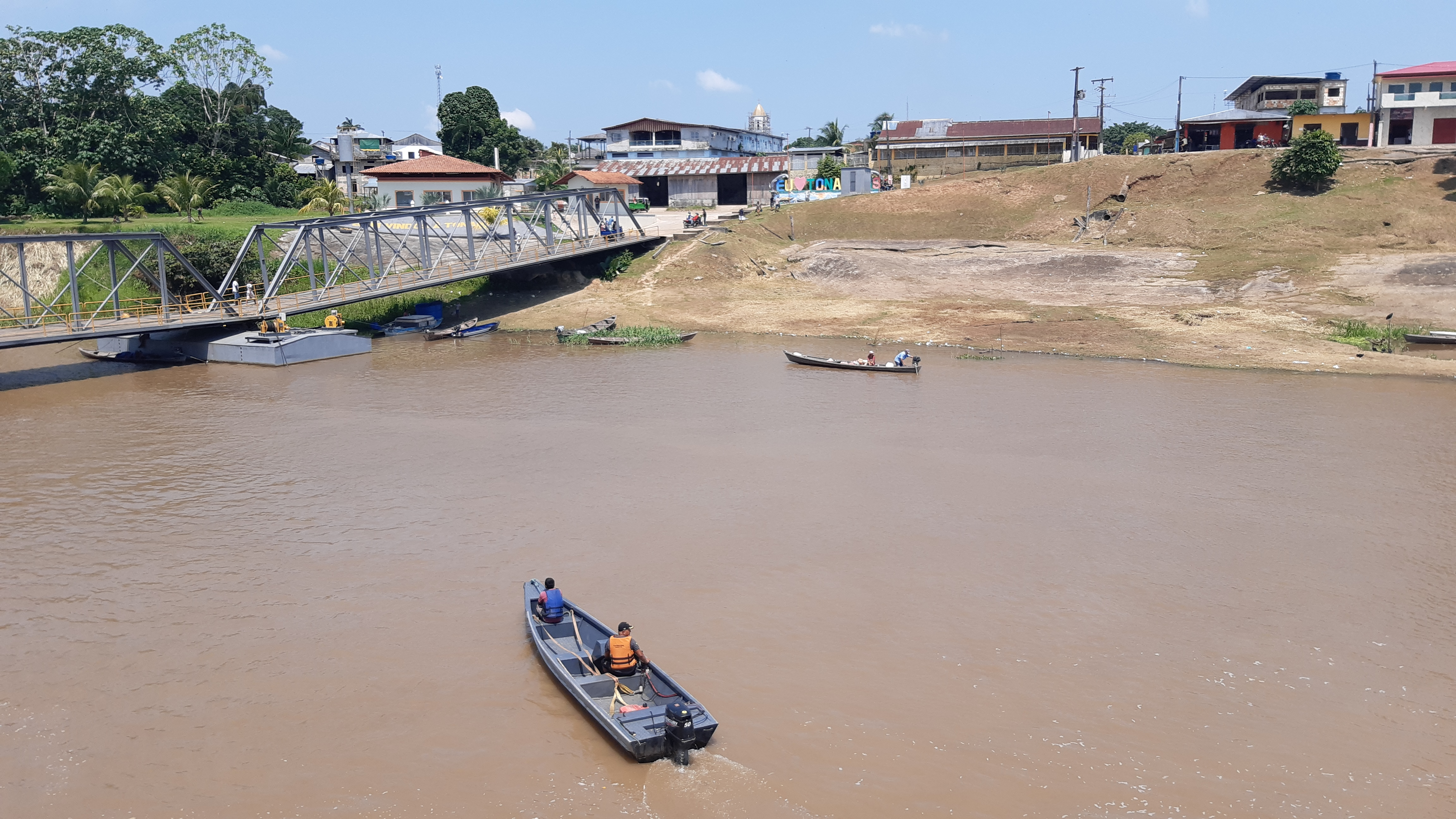
- Tonantins river port in 2024

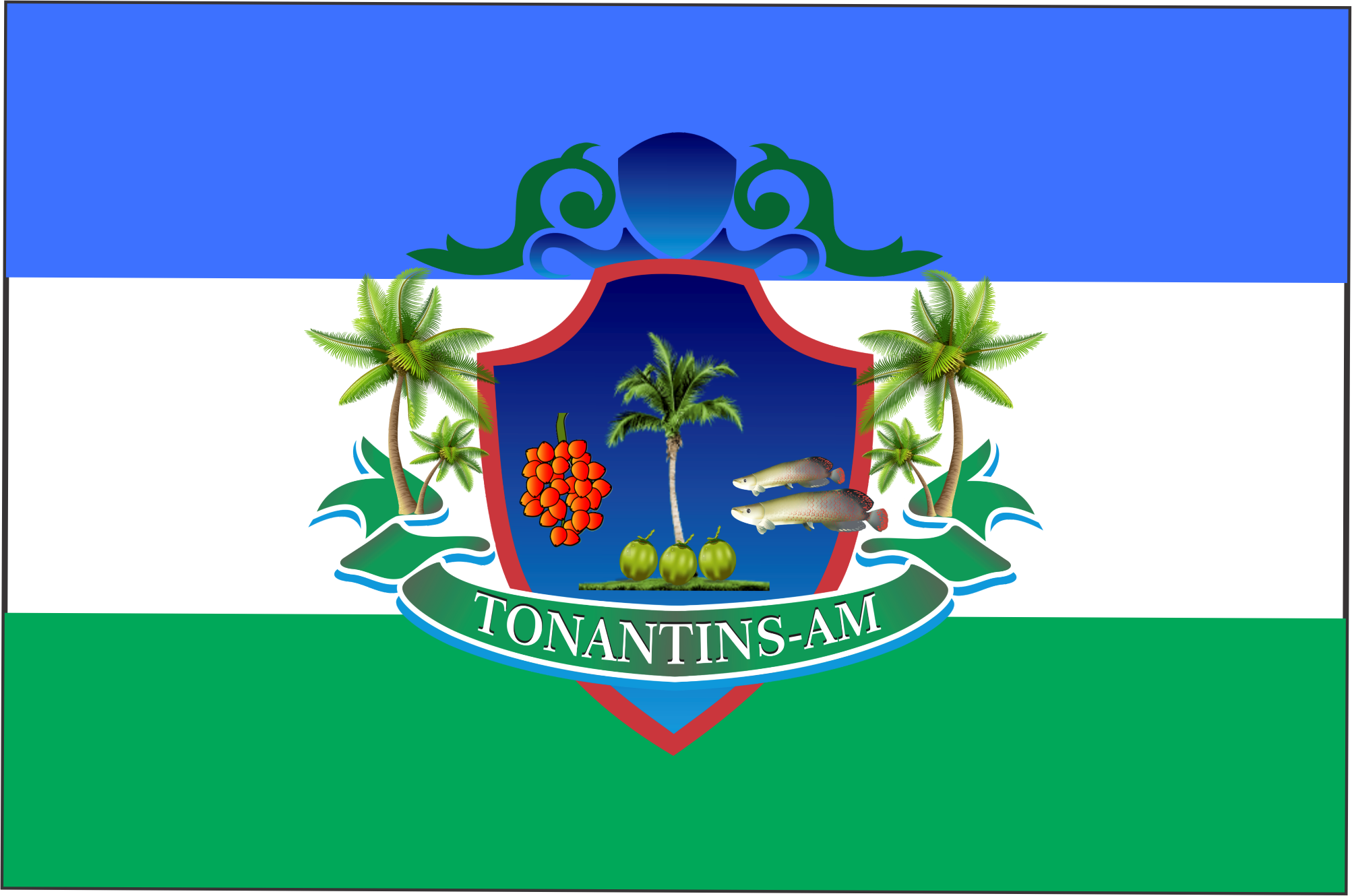
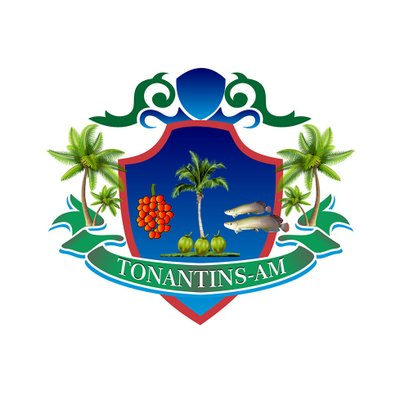
- Flag Coat of arms

- Location of the municipality inside Amazonas

- Location in Brazil
- Coordinates: 2°52′22″S 67°48′7″W
- Country: Brazil
- Region: North
- State: Amazonas

Area
  - Total: 6,446 km^{2} (2,489 sq mi)
- Elevation: 62 m (203 ft)

Population (2020)
  - Total: 18,897
- Time zone: UTC−04:00 (AMT)
- Area code: +55 97
- Demonym: Tonantinense

Tonantins is a municipality in the state of Amazonas in north-western Brazil. Its population was 18,897 as of 2020, all of which were Brazilians. It is on the Amazon River and is 867 km upstream (west) of Manaus, the state capital. The municipality is directly east of and overlaps parts of the Jutaí-Solimões Ecological Station. It is only accessible via boat.

== Geography ==
=== Climate ===
The temperature is almost always between 23 degrees Celsius (74 degrees Fahrenheit) and 31 degrees Celsius (87 degrees Fahrenheit). It is a rainforest humid climate, and the rainy season lasts 8.5 months per year, from mid-October to June.

== Economy ==
The primary economy is subsistence agriculture. The main product is cassava (yuca), followed by beans, rice, and corn.

== History ==
Around 1754, the Spaniards continued to penetrate the western Amazon rainforest, which worried the Portuguese colonial government. In the region of the Putumayo River, with the help of the Franciscans, they had already established several villages and tried to create a fort at the mouth of the river, near the Amazon River. The river had belonged to Spain until then, by virtue of the Treaty of Madrid, but the Spanish wanted to recover at all costs the lost positions, neglecting the Treaty of 1750.

In 1766 they left the fort and went to the river Napo, facing the difficulties of communication with the Papal Post Office and the tropical climate. In 1768 the position, abandoned by the Spanish, was taken by soldiers of the Portuguese captain, who by order of the Governor of the colonial state of the Grão-Pará and Rio Negro, Fernando da Costa de Ataíde Teive, was named Fort of São Fernando do Içá.

New expeditions followed when Colonel Joaquim Tinoco Valente, governor of the Grão-Pará and Rio Negro, became captain; João Pereira Caldas, who was also military, was Xavier de Sampaio's spokesman. The commander of the war expeditions against the invaders was Captain Felipe Sturn.

On October 1, 1777, Portugal and Spain reinstated restrictions in the South American colonies, keeping the 1777 Treaty of Saint Idelfonso in force. In this treaty, the boundaries of the Amazon range from the Madeira River to the central Mamoré River, to the mouth of the Madeira, and straight to the bank of the Javari River, bounded by the Amazon River.

The first village of Tonantins was founded by the Carmelite missionary Frei Matias Diniz, who was settled by the Caiuvicenas natives, and murdered by rival indigenous from a tribe called Tonantins, which gives the name of the municipality and where today it is known as the district of São Francisco.

The village was reborn between 1774 and 1775 by a Lord called Sampaio, who gathered with him the indians of the Caiuvicenas, Passés and Tikunas tribes. On the way, they were catechized by others who came on expeditions, thus building churches and a school.

=== Historical chronology ===
The permanent settlement dates to 1814, when a church was established on the bank of the river. The settlement was originally part of Tefé. On December 1, 1938, Tonantins was made a part of São Paulo de Olivença. On December 19, 1955, Tonantins was made a part of Santo Antônio do Içá. On December 10, 1981, it was separated to form its own jurisdiction. Tonantins was officially incorporated on July 2, 1985.

== In popular culture ==
In 2017, Tonantins was featured in the television show 90 Day Fiancé as the hometown of Karine Martins, one of the cast members.
