= Rico Linhas Aéreas Flight 4823 =

2002 aviation accident

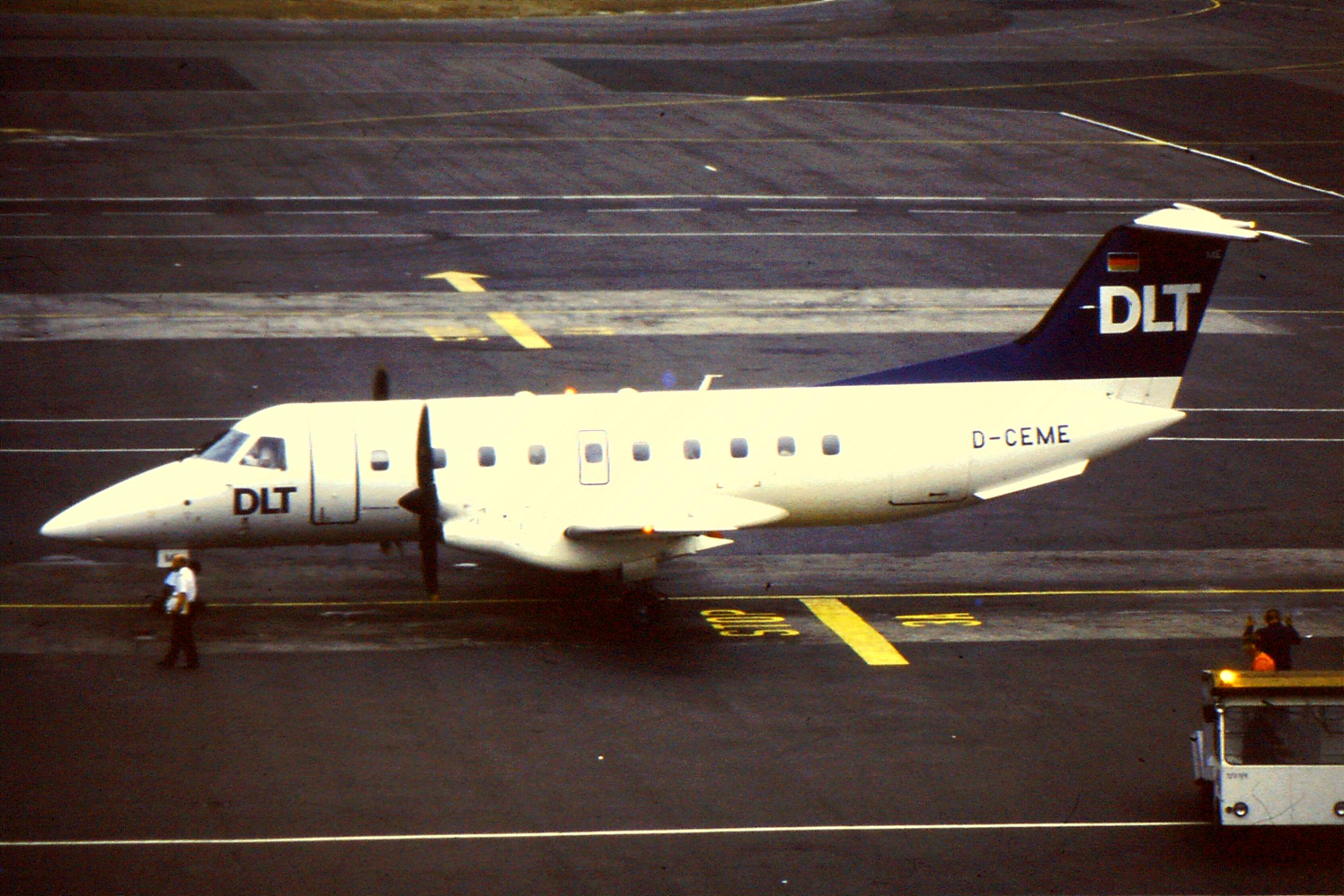
- The aircraft involved in the accident in 1989 while still in service with DLT.

Accident
- Date: 30 August 2002
- Summary: Controlled flight into terrain in inclement weather
- Site: near Rio Branco International Airport, Rio Branco, Brazil

Aircraft
- Aircraft type: Embraer EMB 120 Brasilia
- Operator: Rico Linhas Aéreas
- ICAO flight No.: RLE4823
- Call sign: RICO 4823
- Registration: PT-WRQ
- Flight origin: Cruzeiro do Sul International Airport
- Stopover: Tarauacá Airport
- Destination: Rio Branco International Airport
- Occupants: 31
- Passengers: 28
- Crew: 3
- Fatalities: 23
- Injuries: 8
- Survivors: 8

Rico Linhas Aéreas Flight 4823 was a short haul domestic Brazilian flight from Cruzeiro do Sul and Tarauacá to Rio Branco. On 30 August 2002, the Embraer EMB 120 Brasilia, registration PT-WRQ, flying the route crashed in heavy rain. Of the 31 aboard, 23 were killed, including all three crew members, and 20 of the 28 passengers.

== Accident ==
As the EMB 120 was on approach to Rio Branco, ground controllers granted the flight crew permission to land. The aircraft then entered a rainstorm and shortly after impacted with the ground tail first, 1.5 kilometres (0.93 mi; 0.81 nmi) from the airport. The fuselage broke into three sections and a fire broke out, damaging the airplane beyond repair.
