= Apuí Táxi Aéreo =

Brazilian subregional airline and air taxi company

IATA	ICAO	Call sign
Q1	CQB	APUÍ
- Founded: August 1, 1996; 29 years ago
- Commenced operations: April 30, 2024; 2 years ago (as a regional airline)
- AOC #: 10,216 - January 9, 2023
- Hubs: Eduardo Gomes International Airport
- Fleet size: 2 (as of July 2024)
- Destinations: 3 (as of July 2024)
- Headquarters: Manaus, Brazil
- Website: www.voeapui.com.br

Apuí Táxi Aéreo is a Brazilian subregional airline and air taxi company headquartered in Manaus, Amazonas, which offers scheduled and non-scheduled passenger and cargo flights.

Although the company had been founded in 1996 as an air taxi, it was not authorized to operate scheduled flights until 2024, when it was certified by the National Civil Aviation Agency (ANAC) under the Brazilian Civil Aviation Regulations (RBAC) No. 135.

== History ==
=== Establishment (1996-2002) ===
The history of Apuí Táxi Aéreo dates back to 1996, when the traditional Marmentini family, one of the pioneers of agribusiness in the southern region of Amazonas after migrating from Paraná, decided to create an air taxi company to meet the needs of the municipality of Apuí, whose Territorial extension is greater than that of some Brazilian states and European countries, which would become the largest agricultural province in the state.

Initially, its fleet was made up of small aircraft, including the Embraer EMB 810 Seneca, a Brazilian version of the Piper Seneca produced under license from the North American Piper Aircraft. On August 23, 2000, Apuí Taxi Aéreo received its first Embraer EMB 110 Bandeirante, registration PT-ODJ (MSN 110034).

=== Systematic Air Link (2002-2013) ===
On November 6, 2002, Apuí received its Air Operator Certificate (CHETA, in Portuguese) from the former Department of Civil Aviation (DAC), today ANAC, under the Brazilian Civil Aviation Regulation (RBAC) No. 119, to carry out flights in the Systematic Air Link (LAS) modality, which at the time of its existence was a domestic air service equivalent to the regular air service, carried out by duly certified air taxi companies with aircraft with up to 30 seats, establishing the Eduardo Gomes International Airport, in Manaus, as its base of operations. Still in 2002, added the second EMB 110 Bandeirante, registration PT-ODY (MSN 110039), to the fleet.

In 2003, Apuí received certification from DAC to carry out aeronautical maintenance on its own fleet of EMB 110 Bandeirante and third parties, as well as inspection and some types of maintenance on Pratt & Whitney Canada PT6A-27 engines.

In July 2004, the airline incorporated its first EMB 110P1 Bandeirante, registration PT-OCW (MSN 110273), followed by two more aircraft, registrations PT-GKX (MSN 110129) and PT-GKE (MSN 110096), delivered until December 2005. At the end of 2005, Apuí offered systematic regular flights between Manaus, Apuí, Iauaretê, São Gabriel da Cachoeira and Manicoré, in addition to non-scheduled flights and air taxis to several other cities in the Amazonas region.

In 2007, Apuí added another EMB 110P1 Bandeirante, registration PT-LRR (MSN 110315), totaling six aircraft in the fleet; however, over time, most of them remained grounded due to maintenance problems, with the airline going into decline after 2008.

==== Safety concerns ====
On June 5, 2013, the General Aviation Operations Management (GOAG) of the National Civil Aviation Agency (ANAC) announced the suspension of Apuí Táxi Aéreo's CHETA (air operator certificate) after identifying irregularities in the airline's operations. The precautionary suspension would remain until the irregularities identified and pointed out to the airline through the administrative process opened by the agency were resolved.

=== Beechcraft Baron crash and crisis (2013-2017) ===
On July 16, 2013, just over a month after the suspension of CHETA due to concerns about the safety of its operations, Apuí Táxi Aéreo returned to the newspaper headlines after the Beechcraft 58 Baron registration PR-OKK, leased by the airline of a third operator to carry out an air taxi flight with employees of a state agency of the Amazonas government to the municipality of Apuí, crashing shortly after taking off from Eduardo Gomes International Airport, in Manaus, with a pilot and six passengers on board; there were no survivors.

Apuí came under public scrutiny and the investigation conducted by the Aeronautical Accidents Investigation and Prevention Center (CENIPA) of the Brazilian Air Force (FAB) discovered that the leased plane was registered in the name of Cotrap (Constructora e Transportadora Pioneiro), a company belonging to the owners of the airline, and which was not authorized to conduct passenger flights, only private flights. Furthermore, the investigation uncovered a series of irregularities and violations of aviation safety standards by the airline and its administrators that resulted in the accident, resulting in the opening of a criminal case.

Tarnished by the accident, on August 15, 2013, through Ordinance No. 2,095/2013 published in the Diário Oficial da União (DOU), the official journal of the federal government of Brazil, Apuí Táxi Aéreo recovered its CHETA, according to ANAC, after demonstrating that it adopted measures to mitigate the irregularities found in June and which led to the precautionary suspension. The company resumed its operations, however, with non-scheduled flights and air taxi services.

On June 13, 2017, the airline's administrators were denounced by the Federal Public Prosecutor's Office of Amazonas for violating the safety of air transport, a crime provided for in article 261 of the Brazilian Penal Code. On December 14, the court ordered Apui Táxi Aéreo, Cotrap and its administrators (the same as the airline) to pay compensation of R$1.5 million to the families of the victims.

=== Linha Aérea Redentora (2017-2018) ===
In April 2017, a virtual airline based in Belo Horizonte, called Linha Aérea Redentora, popularly known as "A Redentora", according to its creator, in honor of Isabel, Princess Imperial of Brazil, announced the launch of regional flights within the state of Minas Gerais from the 15th of May of the same year, operated by Apuí Táxi Aéreo. According to the airline, initially, it would offer flights between Brasília and Pampulha Airport with stops in the Minas Gerais municipalities of Paracatu and Patos de Minas, with future plans to launch new destinations, such as Juiz de Fora and Cabo Frio, in Rio de Janeiro.

On May 15, 2017, with flights operated by Apuí Táxi Aéreo, Linha Aérea Redentora began operations in Minas Gerais, flying between Brasília, Paracatu, Patos de Minas and Belo Horizonte with three weekly flights. The company also announced its intention to fly to two more destinations, Manhuaçu (Minas Gerais) and Guarapari (Espírito Santo), in addition to increasing the frequency of current routes in the near future.

However, after two weeks of operations, flights were suspended indefinitely suddenly and without any official explanation from the virtual airline. But later, according to Wilson Pessoa Carvalho, creator of Linha Aérea Redentora, the reason for the suspension of flights was the seizure of the EMB 110 Bandeirante of Apuí Táxi Aéreo at Pampulha Airport, according to him, due to an episode classified as "political ill will". After the episode, the plane was released and returned to operating charter and air taxi flights, returning to its base of operations at Eduardo Gomes International Airport, in Manaus.

=== Resumption of regular flights (2018-2024) ===
On August 17, 2018, Apuí Taxi Aéreo ratified its air operator certificate under RBAC No. 119, once again having permission to carry out flights in the Systematic Air Link (LAS) modality. With a fleet now made up of two EMB 110 Bandeirante, Apuí has resumed its commercial flights between Manaus, Apuí and Manicore.

On December 3, 2021, after changes that occurred in Brazilian aeronautical regulations, which extinguished the Systematic Air Link modality and types of operations provided for in RBAC No. 119, starting to allow air taxi companies with aircraft with up to 19 seats to sell individual air tickets reorganized under RBAC No. 135 on certain rules, Apuí reorganized and was recertified by ANAC, allowing it to carry out non-scheduled flights and air taxi services. On January 9, 2023, the agency concluded a process of verifying the maintenance of Apuí's technical and operational conditions under the new rules, certifying that the company complied with them satisfactorily.

On May 8, 2023, under the new modality of offering flights as an air taxi and after ANAC certified the runway at Barreirinha Airport for the embarkation and disembarkation of passengers, Apuí Táxi Aéreo began a weekly flight on Mondays between Manaus and Barreirinha. Flights were subsequently suspended indefinitely. However, it normally maintained its flights between Manaus, Apuí and Manicore.

==== Request for scheduled commercial flights ====
On May 21, 2023, Apuí Táxi Aéreo formally requested National Civil Aviation Agency of Brazil (ANAC) for a meeting to formalize its request for authorization to carry out regular operations through an amendment to the Operational Specifications (EO) under RBAC No. 135, thus beginning its process to become a regional airline. Following the guidelines of the International Civil Aviation Organization (ICAO), the certification process for a new airline in Brazil is divided into five phases.

On January 26, 2024, Apuí successfully and satisfactorily completed all steps to obtain authorization for regular operations, carrying out verification flights with ANAC inspectors on board between November 22, 23, 26 and 28, in addition of the last one, carried out on December 20th, totaling 13 hours and 55 minutes in five flights (and ten sections) between the airports of Apuí, Barcelos, Coari, Manaus and Manicoré.

=== Transformation into a regional airline (2024-present) ===
On March 4, 2024, Apuí Táxi Aéreo obtained authorization to carry out regular operations under the terms of the Operational Specifications (EO) contained in its RBAC No. 135 certification, being able to initially use its fleet of Embraer EMB 110 Bandeirante on regular commercial flights between Manaus, Apuí and Manicoré, becoming the newest Brazilian regional airline. The process carried out by Apuí is similar to that used by Abaeté Aviação, which since 2020 has also become a regional airline through this same certification process.

==== Inaugural flight ====
Apuí Táxi Aéreo's inaugural flight as a regional airline took place on the morning of April 30, 2024, when flight Q1-0001 took off from Eduardo Gomes International Airport bound for Apuí Airport, popularly known as Prainha Airport. After stopping to disembark and board passengers in Apuí, the plane took off towards Manicoré Airport on flight Q1-0002, returning directly to Manaus as Q1-0003.

== Destinations ==
As of April 2024, Apuí Táxi Aéreo operated scheduled services to the following destinations in Brazil:

Base
Future
Terminated

Apuí Táxi Aéreo destinations
State	City	Airport	Notes
Amazonas
Amazonas	Apuí	Prainha Airport	Started April 30, 2024
Amazonas	Manaus	Eduardo Gomes International Airport	HUB
Amazonas	Manicoré	Manicoré Airport	Started April 30, 2024

== Fleet ==
As of April 2024, the fleet of Apuí Táxi Aéreo includes the following aircraft:

Apuí Táxi Aéreo fleet
Aircraft	In service	Orders	Passengers	Note
Embraer EMB 110P Bandeirante	2	—	15	PT-GKX std in Manaus
TOTAL	2	—		

== See also ==
- Abaeté Aviação
- List of airlines of Brazil
