= Rico Linhas Aéreas Flight 4815 =

2004 aviation accident in Brazil

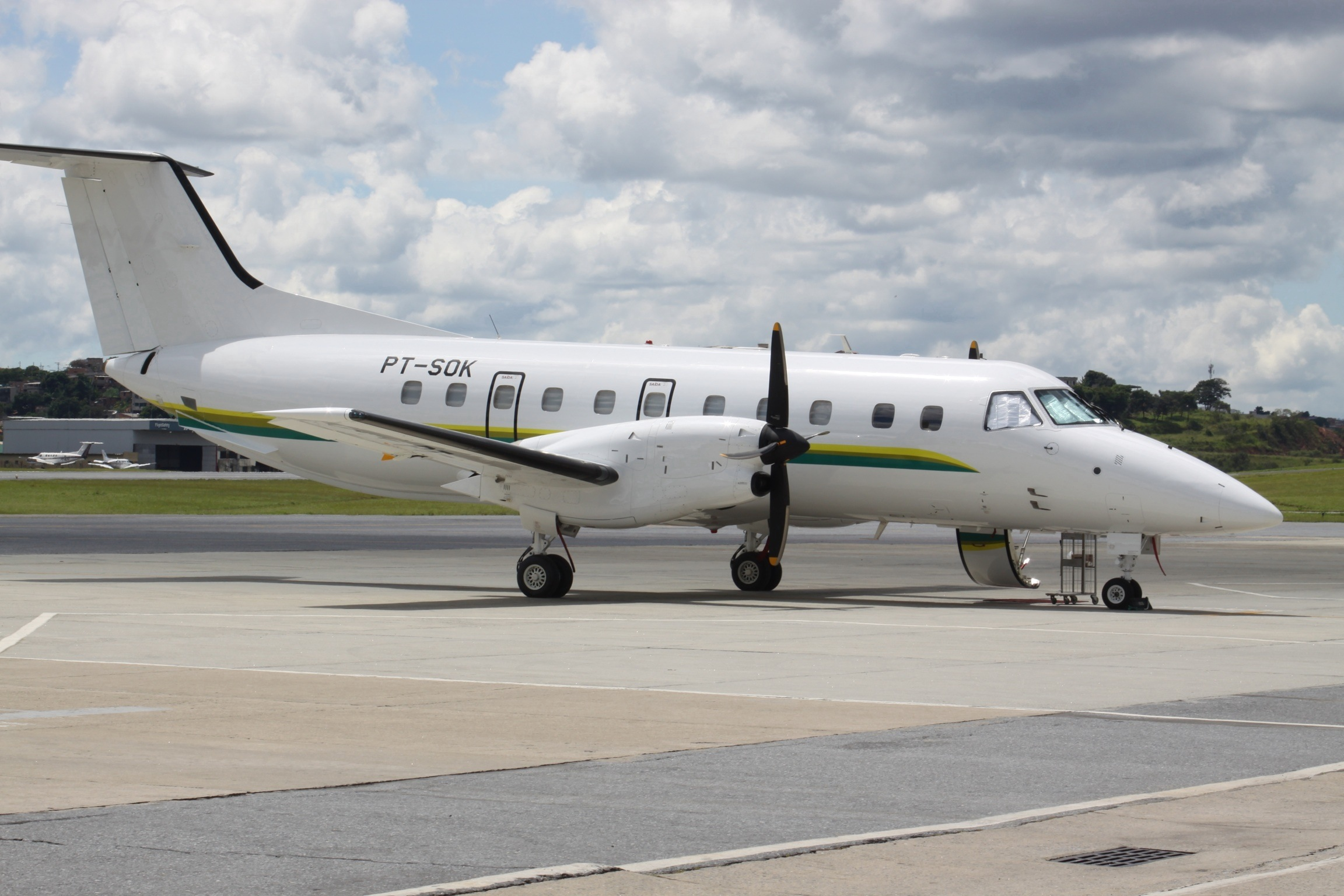
- A Brazilian registered Embraer EMB 120 similar to the one involved in the crash

Accident
- Date: 14 May 2004
- Summary: Controlled flight into terrain due to pilot error
- Site: Amazon rainforest, near Eduardo Gomes International Airport, Manaus, Brazil; 02°54′47″S 060°12′12″W

Aircraft
- Aircraft type: Embraer EMB 120 Brasilia
- Operator: Rico Linhas Aéreas
- Registration: PT-WRO
- Flight origin: Tefé Airport, Tefé, Brazil
- Destination: Eduardo Gomes International Airport, Manaus, Brazil
- Occupants: 33
- Passengers: 30
- Crew: 3
- Fatalities: 33
- Survivors: 0

Rico Linhas Aéreas Flight 4815 was a domestic scheduled passenger flight from São Paulo de Olivença, via Tefé, to Manaus, the capital of Amazonas state, northwest Brazil. On 14 May 2004, the aircraft operating the flight, an Embraer EMB 120 Brasilia, crashed into the dense Amazon rainforest while on approach to Manaus. All 33 people on board were killed.

== Background ==
=== Aircraft ===
The aircraft involved, manufactured in 1988, was a twin-engine Embraer EMB 120ER registered as PT‑WRO. The engine, propeller, and aircraft logbooks were all up to date.

=== Passengers and crew ===
There were 30 passengers and 3 crew members on board the aircraft. The captain of the flight had over 19,000 flight hours, 5,819 of which were on this type of aircraft. The first officer had almost 12,000 flight hours, of which 4,637 were on this type of aircraft. Both pilots were qualified and experienced enough to operate the flight.

== Accident ==
The aircraft departed Tefé Airport at 17:30 AMT (UTC−04:00) en route to Eduardo Gomes International Airport, Manaus. At 18:26, 64 nautical miles (74 mi) away from the airport, the aircraft was cleared to descend to 8,000 feet (2,400 m), and subsequently cleared to 2,000 feet (610 m). At 18:31, in order to maintain separation from another aircraft, the flight was placed under radar vectoring and instructed to follow certain headings. At 18:34, the aircraft was given its last heading guidance, still instructed to maintain 2,000 feet, and at 18:35:03 the crew confirmed these instructions. This was the final contact between the flight and air traffic control. Less than 30 seconds later the CVR recording ended when the aircraft impacted an equatorial forest at an altitude of 550 feet (170 m), wings level, at over 250 knots (460 km/h). All 33 passengers and crew were killed.

== Aftermath ==
The next day, at 00:10, after a six-hour search near the river of Rio Negro, local emergency services located the crash site with rescue teams arriving there at 00:28, reporting that the aircraft had been destroyed with all occupants having been killed.

== Investigation ==
Investigators managed to locate the aircraft's digital flight data recorder (DFDR) and cockpit voice recorder (CVR). Due to the severity of the destruction at the crash site, the aircraft's digital flight data acquisition unit (DFDAU) could not be found. Although the DFDR's outer casing was badly damaged by the crash, the inner protective casing was intact. Both flight recorders were sent to Embraer, but were too damaged to carry out a proper reading. The recorders were then sent to the National Transportation Safety Board's (NTSB) laboratories in Washington, DC, United States, where an attempt at reading the DFDR was unsuccessful due to the recording head being dirty. The readout of the CVR was successful.
