= TRQ =

TRQ or trq may refer to:

- Tariff-rate quota, a trade policy tool
- Tarauacá Airport, in Acre, Brazil (by IATA code)
- Trique language, spoken in Mexico (by ISO 639 code)
