= Rio Branco International Airport =

Airport serving Rio Branco, Acre, Brazil

Rio Branco–Plácido de Castro International Airport Aeroporto Internacional de Rio Branco–Plácido de Castro
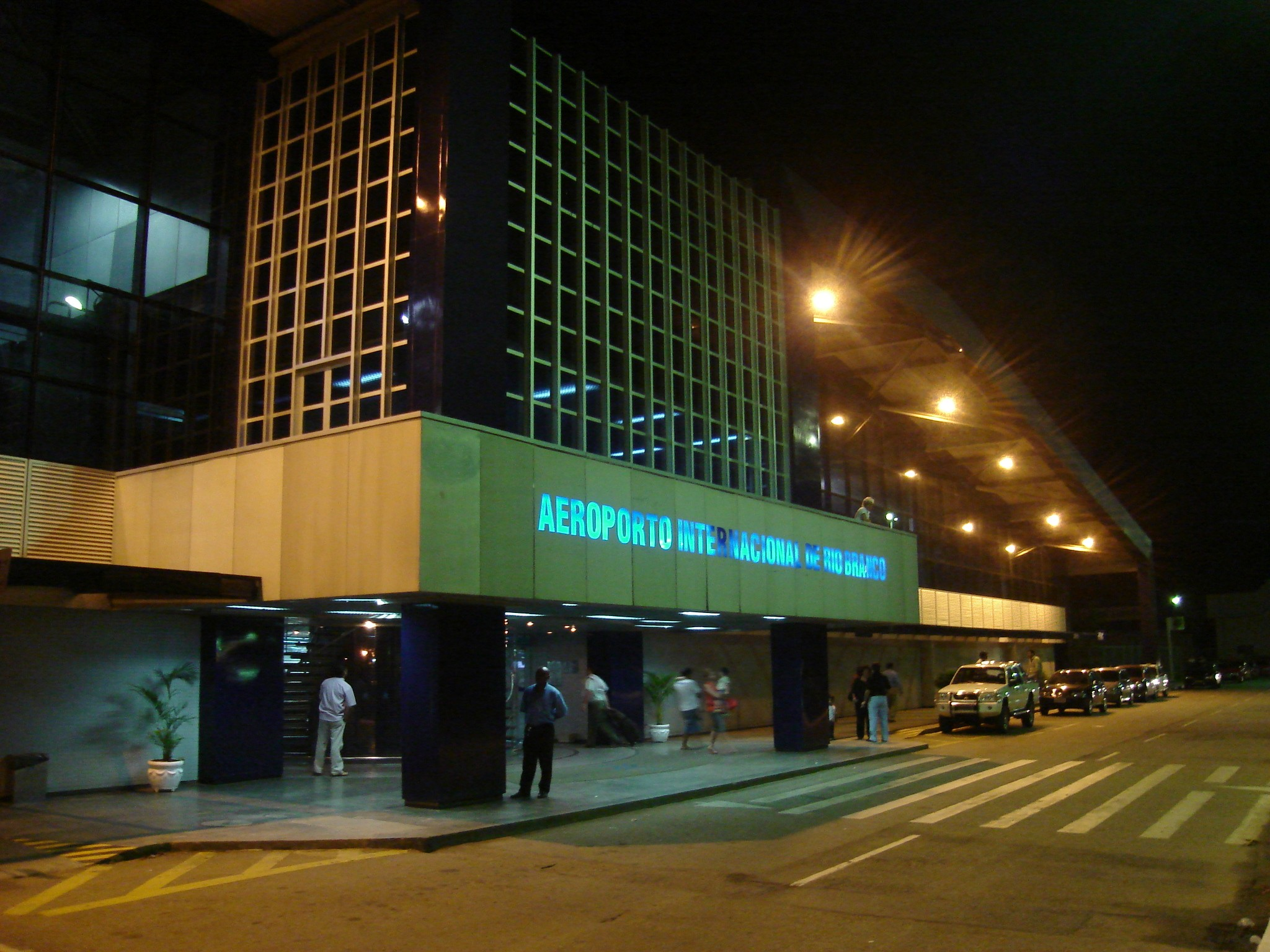
- IATA: RBR; ICAO: SBRB; LID: AC0001

Summary
- Airport type: Public
- Operator: Infraero (1999–2021); Vinci (2021–present)
- Serves: Rio Branco
- Opened: November 22, 1999; 26 years ago
- Time zone: BRT−2 (UTC−05:00)
- Elevation AMSL: 193 m (633 ft)
- Coordinates: 09°52′06″S 067°53′53″W
- Website: www.riobranco-airport.com.br

Map
- Location in Brazil

Runways
Direction	Length		Surface
Direction	m	ft	Surface
06/24	2,158	7,080	Asphalt

Statistics (2025)
- Passengers: 453,672 ▲16%
- Aircraft Operations: 8,006 ▲23%
- Statistics: Vinci; Sources: Airport Website, ANAC, DECEA

Rio Branco–Plácido de Castro International Airport (IATA: RBR, ICAO: SBRB) is an airport serving Rio Branco, Brazil. Since April 13, 2009 the airport is named after José Plácido de Castro (1873–1908) a politician leader of the Acrean Revolution.

It is operated by Vinci SA.

== History ==
The airport was commissioned on November 22, 1999, as a replacement to Presidente Médici International Airport, which was then closed.

Previously operated by Infraero, on April 7, 2021 Vinci SA won a 30-year concession to operate the airport.

== Airlines and destinations ==
Airlines	Destinations
Azul Brazilian Airlines	Belo Horizonte–Confins, Manaus (begins 12 December 2026)
Gol Linhas Aéreas	Brasília, Cruzeiro do Sul, Manaus (ends 31 January 2027), Porto Velho (ends 31 January 2027)
LATAM Brasil	Brasília, São Paulo–Guarulhos

== Statistics ==
Following are the number of passenger, aircraft and cargo movements at the airport, according to Infraero (2007-2021) and Vinci (2022-2025) reports:

Year	Passenger	Aircraft	Cargo (t)
2025	453,672 ▲16%	8,006 ▲23%	
2024	390,927 ▲10%	6,515 ▼11%	
2023	356,414 ▼7%	7,329 ▼8%	
2022	381,764 ▲30%	7,957 ▲15%	
2021	293,750 ▲54%	6,895 ▲27%	1,290 ▲97%
2020	191,100 ▼46%	5,411 ▼24%	654 ▼54%
2019	353,743 ▲15%	7,095 ▲2%	1,431 ▼2%
2018	308,721 ▼11%	6,923 ▲6%	1,460 ▼5%
2017	345,079 ▼3%	6,520 ▲4%	1,535 ▲35%
2016	354,249 ▼8%	6,283 ▼11%	1,138 ▼18%
2015	387,071 ▼1%	7,046 ▼29%	1,387 ▼7%
2014	391,038 ▲3%	9,876 ▼6%	1,493 ▲49%
2013	378,411 ▼2%	10,504 ▼18%	1,000 ▼27%
2012	384,877 ▼2%	12,749 ▼22%	1,373 ▲4%
2011	393,811 ▲11%	16,352 ▲2%	1,319 ▲10%
2010	355,916 ▲10%	16,019 ▲20%	1,204 ▼25%
2009	323,114 ▲7%	13,392 ▲9%	1,598 ▲20%
2008	302,551 ▼4%	12,326 ▲8%	1,327 ▼39%
2007	313,987	11,440	2,170

== Accidents and incidents ==
- 30 August 2002: a Rico Linhas Aéreas Embraer EMB 120ER Brasília registration PT-WRQ, operating Flight 4823 en route from Tarauacá to Rio Branco crashed on approach to Rio Branco during a rainstorm, 1.5 km short of the runway. Of the 31 passengers and crew aboard, 23 died.
- 29 October 2023: a Cessna 208B Grand Caravan registration PT-MEE operated by ART Táxi Aéreo bound for Envira crashed and exploded shortly after takeoff, killing all 12 people on board.

== Access ==
The airport is located 25 km (16 mi) from downtown Rio Branco.

== See also ==
- List of airports in Brazil
