= Pena Transportes Aéreos =

Brazilian airline

PENTA – Pena Transportes Aéreos
IATA	ICAO	Call sign
5P	PEP	AEROPENA
- Founded: 1995
- Commenced operations: 1995
- Ceased operations: 2005
- Headquarters: Santarém, Brazil
- Key people: César Pena Fernandes

PENTA – Pena Transportes Aéreos S/A was a Brazilian airline founded in 1995. It operated domestic services in the Amazon area and to neighbouring French Guiana. In 2005 it ceased activities.

== History ==
The airline had its origins on a local air taxi company called Pena Táxi Aéreo founded in 1989. In 1995, the owner of the air taxi company founded a sister company: PENTA Pena Transportes Aéreos, authorized to operate regular scheduled regional flights on the trunk route Manaus-Eduardo Gomes / Santarém / Belém-Val de Cães.

Operations grew steadily with addition of new equipment. In 1998 PENTA was flying to 34 cities and included an international route linking Belém-Val de Cães and Cayenne via Macapá. That year PENTA carried 235,000 passengers.

In 1999 however, PENTA suffered a hard blow during the currency exchange devaluation crisis. Leasing and insurance costs more than doubled and the airline was forced to return the Dash-8-300 and an Embraer EMB120 Brasília. A second blow came at the end of 2000, when the Brazilian Civil Aviation Agency temporarily suspended the operational license of PENTA due to alleged maintenance problems. In the beginning of 2001 PENTA resumed its services but continuous economic difficulties lead PENTA to cease passenger operations in December 2004. The fleet of Cessna 208B Caravan was transferred back to the sister air taxi company. PENTA still operated cargo and mail flights with its remaining Embraer EMB 110 Bandeirante for some weeks but eventually ceased all operations by the end of January 2005.

== Destinations ==
In 1998 PENTA was operating to 34 cities in the states of Amapá, Amazonas, Ceará, Maranhão, Mato Grosso, Pará, Roraima, and Tocantins, and to Cayenne in French Guiana.

== Fleet ==
PENTA fleet
Aircraft	Total	Years of operation	Notes
Cessna 208B Caravan	7	1995–2004	
Embraer EMB 110 Bandeirante	2	1995–2005	
Embraer EMB 120 Brasília	3	1996–2004	
Bombardier Dash 8-300	2	1997–2000	

== Airline Affinity Program ==
Penta did not have an airline affinity program.

== Accidents and incidents ==
- 26 April 1994: a Cessna 208A Caravan registration PT-OGI flying from Itaituba to Jacareacanga under poor visibility and below minimums crashed shortly before touch-down at Jacareacanga partly due to the pilot's lack of experience. The crew of 2 died.

== See also ==
- List of defunct airlines of Brazil
