= SWBI =

SWBI may refer to:

- Barreirinha Airport (ICAO: SWBI), an airport in Brazil
- Smith & Wesson (Nasdaq: SWBI), an American firearms manufacturer
