= SBTK =

SBTK may refer to:

- Tarauacá Airport, Brazil (by ICAO code)
- Skepplanda bordtennisklubb, a sports club in Skepplanda, Sweden
