= Jutaí =

Municipality of Amazonas, Brazil

- Municipality
- Municipality of Jutaí
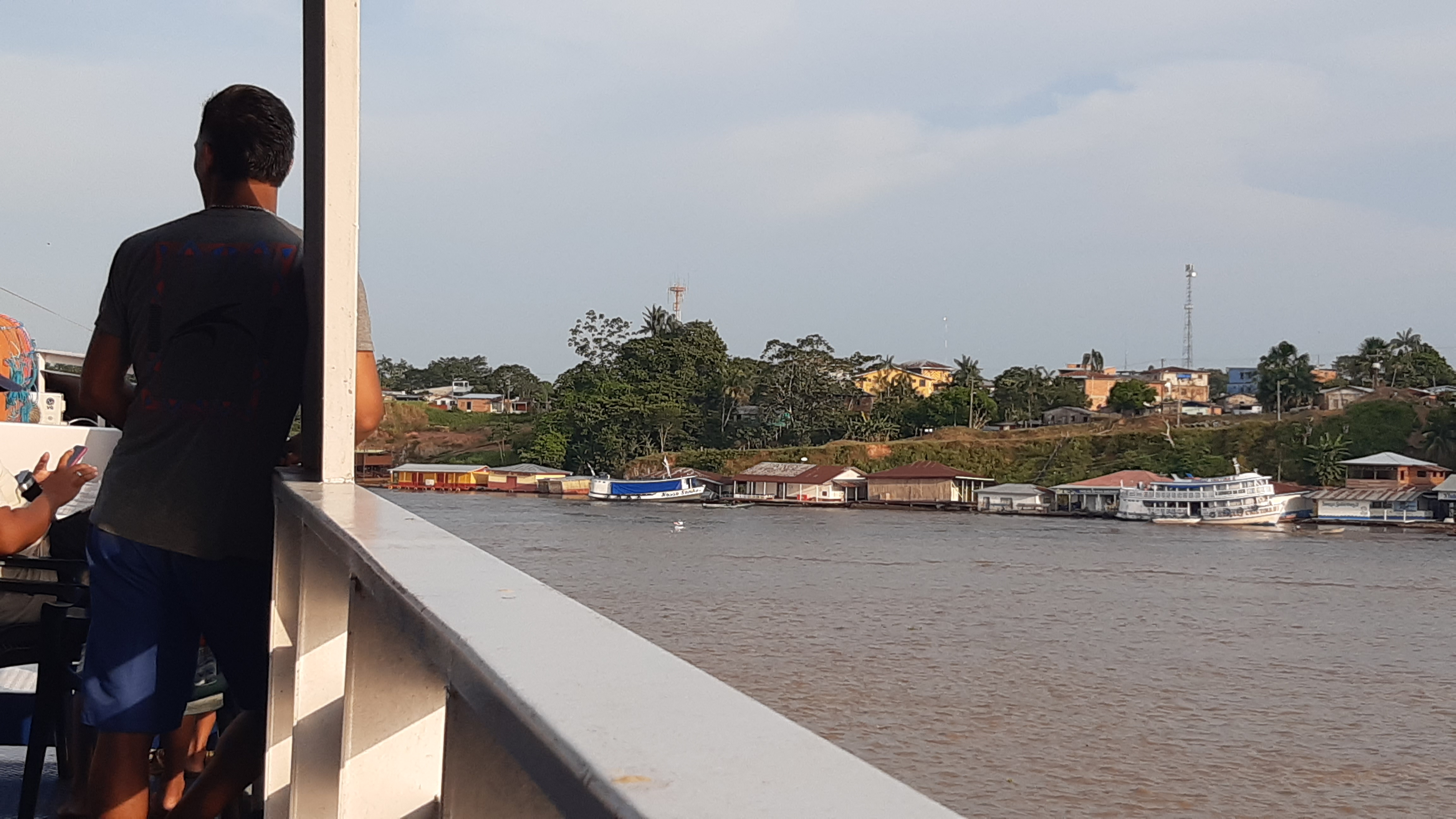
- Jutaí as seen from a ship

- Flag
- Nickname: "
- Motto: Jutaí lidera a calha do Juruá (Jutaí leads the rain gutter of Jaruá [river])
- Location of Jutaí in the State of Amazonas
- Coordinates: 02°44′49″S 66°46′01″W
- Country: Brazil
- Region: North
- State: Amazonas
- Founded: 1728

Government
  - Mayor: Asclepiades Costa de Souza (PR)

Area
  - Total: 69,552 km^{2} (26,854 sq mi)
- Elevation: 70 m (230 ft)

Population (2020)
  - Total: 13,886
  - Density: 26/km^{2} (67/sq mi)
- Time zone: UTC-4 (AST)
  - Summer (DST): UTC-4 (DST no longer used)
- Area code: +55 92
- HDI (2000): 0.533 – medium
- Website: Manaus, Amazonas

Jutaí is a municipality located in the Brazilian state of Amazonas. Its population is 13,886 (2020) and its area is 69,552 km^{2}, making it the fifth largest municipality in Amazonas by area and the ninth largest in Brazil.

== Geography ==
The municipality is in the Juruá-Purus moist forests ecoregion. It contains parts of the Jutaí-Solimões Ecological Station. It contains the 275,533-hectare (680,860-acre) Rio Jutaí Extractive Reserve, created in 2002. The municipality contains the 2,450,380-hectare (6,055,000-acre) Cujubim Sustainable Development Reserve, established in 2003. This is the largest conservation unit in Amazonas and the largest sustainable development reserve in the world.

== Hino de Jutaí ==
=== Melodia: Moisés Ferreira ===
Jutaí sempre bela e fulgente

sobre as margens de um rio colossal

qual estrela de um brilho excedente

neste solo que em ti é igual.

Tu as águas qual negros cabelos

dos valentes que o tempo levou

mazonas de bravos guerreiros

este chão tua braveza vingou.

Honra e glória é o nosso destino

nossa força é viver no teu chão

qual ditoso e felizes seremos

Jutaí nossa eterna paixão.

No clarão desta linda paisagem

sob o verde da imensa floresta

entre matas e rios selvagens

prevalece a certeza que resta.

Dentre mil és a mais exultante

um lampejo de luz neste céu

panorama de um brilho pujante

resplandece através do teu véu.

Inflamados de orgulho e encanto

na beleza dos igarapés

nosso olhos tomados de espantos

Jutaí quão formosas tu és...

Horizonte o futuro desponta

tão radiante na imensidão

do progresso a estrela luzente

ornamenta este audaz pavilhão.

Simbolismo augusto e sagrado

que nos mostra com garbo valor

as conquistas de um nobre passado

e as vitórias regadas na dor.

Neste solo onde os fortes descansam

e onde dormem nossos ancestrais

haja sempre no céu uma bênção

Jutaí teu progresso é de paz.

Nossos sonhos plantados na terra

abundantes florescerão

e a bandeira que surge do povo

há de ser sempre a da união.

Que o sol da justiça renasça

e homem livres com harpas nas mãos

sob o peito estampado a certeza

de um louvor que celebre a cancão.

A canção cheia de liberdade

fulgente garbosa e gentil

com o povo da nossa cidade

Jutaí com orgulho é Brasil.

== Sources ==
- RDS Cujubim (in Portuguese), ISA: Instituto Socioambiental
- RESEX do Rio Jutaí (in Portuguese), ISA: Instituto Socioambiental
- Unidade de Conservação: Estação Ecológica de Jutaí-Solimões (in Portuguese), MMA: Ministério do Meio Ambiente
