= Apuí Airport =

Apuí Airport Aeroporto de Apuí
- IATA: IUP; ICAO: SWYN; LID: AM0023

Summary
- Airport type: Public
- Serves: Apuí
- Hub for: Apuí Táxi Aéreo
- Time zone: BRT-1 (UTC−04:00)
- Elevation AMSL: 60 m (200 ft)
- Coordinates: 07°10′20″S 059°50′20″W

Map
- Location in Brazil

Runways
Direction	Length		Surface
Direction	m	ft	Surface
08/26	1,200	3,937	Asphalt
- Sources: ANAC, DECEA

Apuí Airport (IATA: IUP, ICAO: SWYN), popularly called Prainha Airport is the airport serving Apuí, Brazil.

== Airlines and destinations ==
Airlines	Destinations
Apuí Táxi Aéreo	Manaus, Manicoré

== Access ==
The airport is located 7 km (4 mi) from downtown Apuí.

== See also ==
- List of airports in Brazil
