= Javari-Buriti Area of Relevant Ecological Interest =

- Área de Relevante Interesse Ecológico Javari-Buriti
- IUCN category IV (habitat/species management area)
- Location within Brazil
- Nearest city: Santo Antônio do Içá, Amazonas
- Coordinates: 3.100754°S 67.818438°W
- Area: 15,000 hectares (37,000 acres)
- Designation: Area of relevant ecological interest
- Created: 5 November 1985
- Administrator: Chico Mendes Institute for Biodiversity Conservation

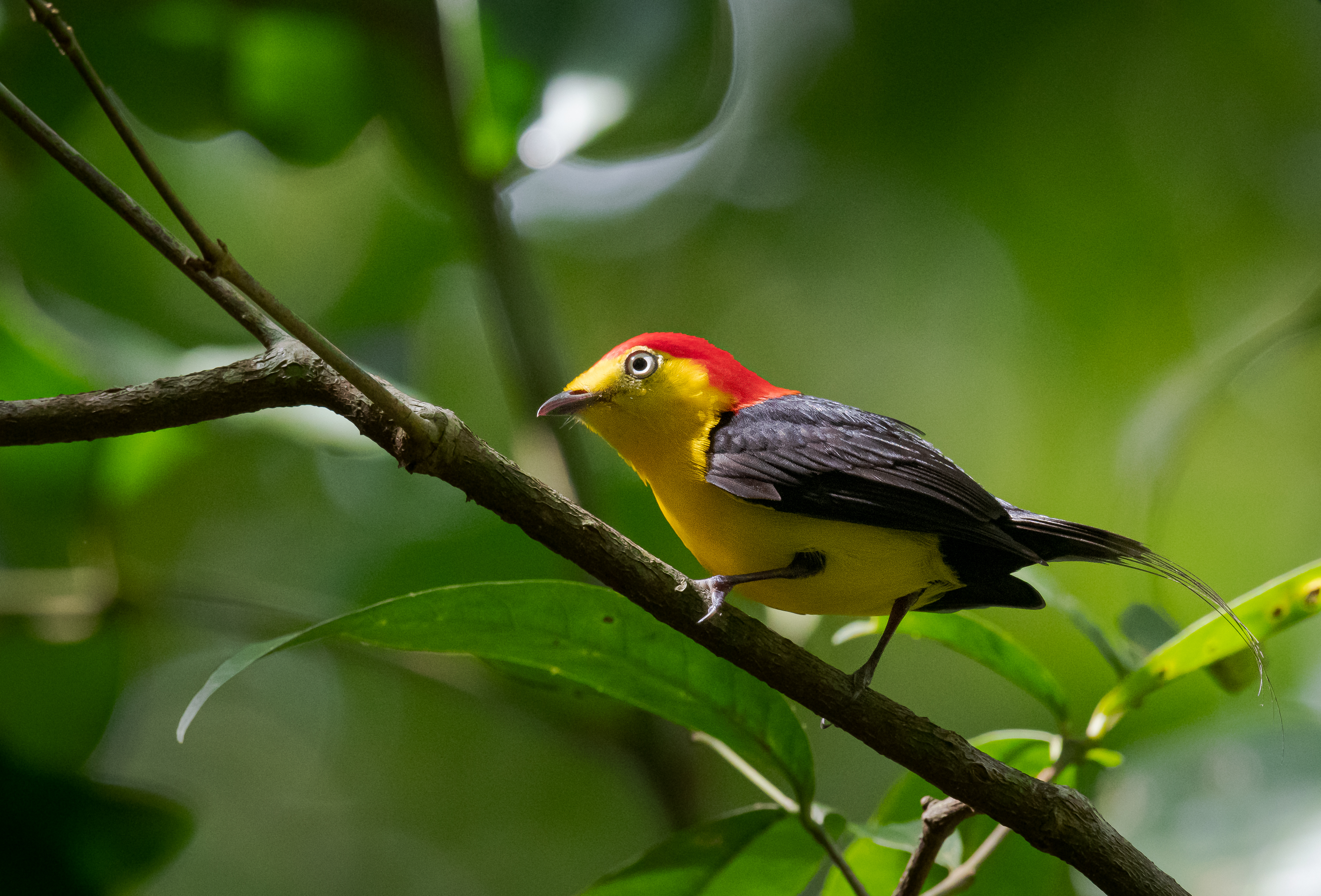
Wire-tailed manakin

The Javari-Buriti Area of Relevant Ecological Interest (Portuguese: Área de Relevante Interesse Ecológico Javari-Buriti) is an area of relevant ecological interest in the state of Amazonas, Brazil.

== Location ==
The Javari-Buriti Area of Relevant Ecological Interest (ARIE) is in the municipality of Santo Antônio do Içá, Amazonas. It has an area of 15,000 hectares (37,000 acres). (Note: Officially the area of 13,177.01 hectares (32,561.1 acres).) It is bonded to the east by the Jutaí-Solimões Ecological Station and to the north by the Solimões River. The western boundary is a few kilometers east of a channel of the Solimões. It is bounded to the south by the eastern portion of the Betânia Indigenous Territory, which overlaps with the Jutaí-Solimões Ecological Station.

== History ==
The Javari-Buriti Area of Relevant Ecological Interest was created by federal decree 91.886 of 5 November 1985. The purpose was to protect an area of Buriti palm forests and associated fauna. It is classed as IUCN protected area category IV (habitat/species management area) with the objective of maintaining natural ecosystems of regional or local importance and regulating use to make it compatible with conservation of nature. It became part of the Central Amazon Ecological Corridor, created in 2002. The ARIE is administered by the federal Chico Mendes Institute for Biodiversity Conservation.

== Sources ==
- Arie Javari Buriti (in Portuguese), ICMBio: Chico Mendes Institute for Biodiversity Conservation, archived from the original on 2016-10-19
- ARIE Javari-Buriti (in Portuguese), ISA: Instituto Socioambiental
- CEC Central da Amazônia (in Portuguese), ISA: Instituto Socioambiental
- Unidade de Conservação: Área de Relevante Interesse Ecológico Javari Buriti (in Portuguese), MMA: Ministério do Meio Ambiente
