= RICO Táxi Aéreo =

Brazilian Air Taxi company

IATA	ICAO	Call sign
—	—	RICO
- Founded: January 14, 1980; 46 years ago
- AOC #: 8,735 - August 2, 2022
- Headquarters: Manaus, Brazil
- Key people: Munur Yurtsever (Founder); Omer Yurtsever (Co-founder); Átila Yurtsever (Co-owner); Metin Yurtsever (Co-owner)
- Website: www.voerico.com.br

RICO Táxi Aéreo LTDA is a Brazilian air taxi company headquartered in Manaus, Amazonas, which offers non-scheduled and charter passenger and cargo flights.

== History ==
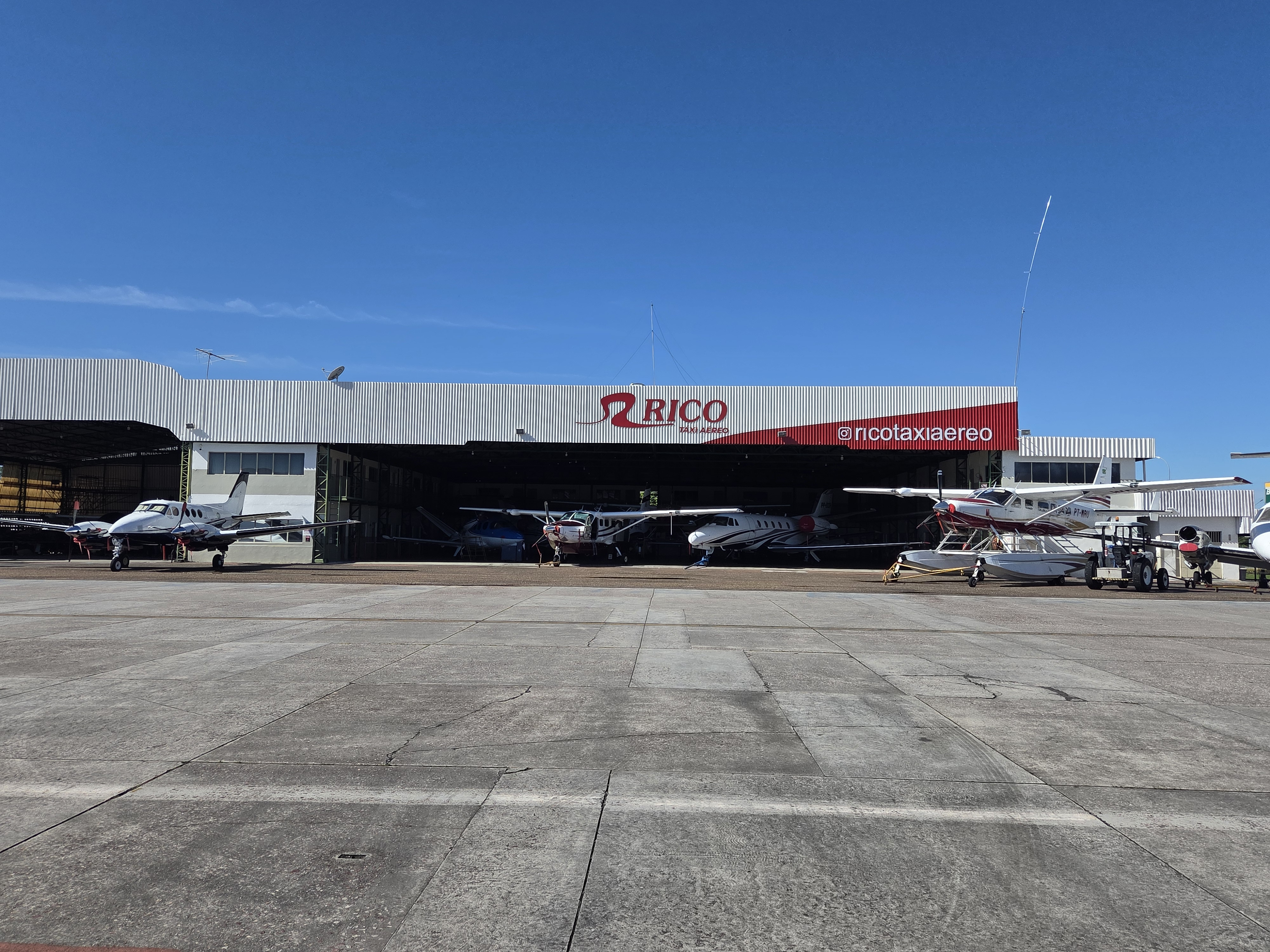
Hangar and Headquarters of Rico Táxi Aéreo

The history of RICO Táxi Aéreo begins with Munur Yurtsever, a fighter pilot born in Skopje, then part of Yugoslavia. Due to political reasons he migrated to Turkey and looking for better opportunities he moved to Brazil. In 1957 he established himself in Nova Xavantina, Mato Grosso. The locals, not being able to pronounce his name, nicknamed him Mickey.

In Nova Xavantina he worked as an airplane mechanic but in no time bought an aircraft and started to fly in the region. The operations consisted of transportation of cargo to gold-mining locations of the region using small aircraft. In 1965 he and the business partner Apolonildo Brito started a small charter and air taxi company called Táxi Aéreo Rondônia, specialized in flying to gold-mining centers of Rondônia and headquartered in Porto Velho. During the construction of the Trans-Amazonian highway, the company changed its headquarters to Manaus, and provided air services to the big construction companies that were building the highway. The partnership ended in 1969 and on the same year Yurtsever created RICO – Rondônia Indústria e Comércio Air Taxi. In 1980 RICO merged with Táxi Aéreo Rondônia and RICO Táxi Aéreo was born.

From 1974 to 1986 RICO Táxi Aéreo maintained a contract with Petrobras to provide air-transportation while it was searching for oil and natural gas in the Amazonian region. At that time, RICO operated 51 Douglas DC-3s being the largest private operator of this type of aircraft in the world at that time.

On November 1, 1996, while maintaining its independent air taxi operations, the owners of RICO Táxi Aéreo created Rico Linhas Aéreas, a regional scheduled airline. This airline ceased operations on June 1, 2010.

However, RICO Air Taxi continued its operations.

== Fleet ==
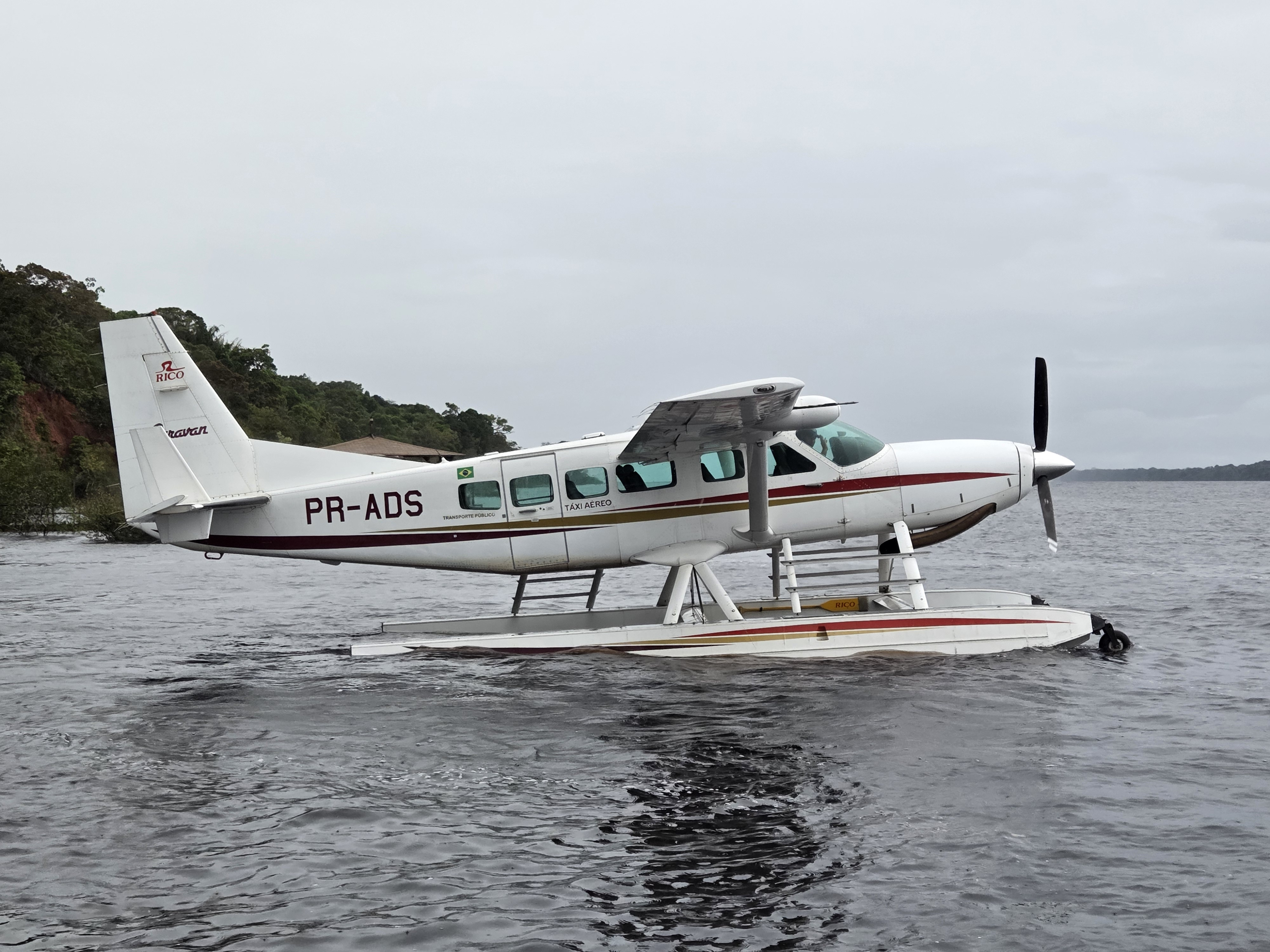
Cessna 208 Caravan amphibian

Rico Táxi Aéreo fleet included the following aircraft configured in all-economy class as of April 2026:

Rico Táxi Aéreo
Aircraft	Quantity	Passengers	Operation	Notes
Beechcraft King Air B200	1	7		
Cessna Citation 560 XLS	2	9		
Cessna 208 Caravan	3 amphibian 2 terrain	8 amphibian 9 terrain		
Embraer EMB 110P1/E Bandeirante	2	18 (P1) 15 (E)		

== See also ==
- Rico Linhas Aéreas
- List of airlines of Brazil
