= Jutaí-Solimões Ecological Station =

Ecological station in Amazonas, Brazil

- Estação Ecológica de Jutaí-Solimões
- IUCN category Ia (strict nature reserve)
- Location within Brazil
- Coordinates: 3.333°S 67.916°W
- Area: 289,511 hectares (715,400 acres)
- Designation: Ecological station
- Created: 21 June 1983

The Jutaí-Solimões Ecological Station (Portuguese: Estação Ecológica de Jutaí-Solimões) is an ecological station in the state of Amazonas, Brazil. It protects an area of flooded and terra firme forest in the Amazon biome.

== Location ==
The Ecological Station covers 289,511 hectares (715,400 acres) in the Amazonia biome. The station lies between the Jutaí and Solimões rivers.

It covers parts of the municipalities of Amaturá, Jutaí, Santo Antônio do Içá and Tonantins in the state of Amazonas.

It is bounded to the east by the Rio Jutaí Extractive Reserve, on the opposite side of the Jutaí River, and to the west by the Javari-Buriti Area of Relevant Ecological Interest.

The Betânia Indigenous Territory overlaps the western part of the ESEC and the São Domingos do Jacapari e Estação Indigenous Territory overlaps the northern part.

== History ==
The Jutaí-Solimões Ecological Reserve by federal decree 88.541 of 21 July 1983.

Ordnance 375 of 11 October 2001 recategorized the ecological reserve as an ecological station with the present name.

The Ecological Station is a "strict nature reserve" under IUCN protected area category Ia.

The purpose is to conserve nature and conduct scientific research.

It is administered by the Chico Mendes Institute for Biodiversity Conservation.

It became part of the Central Amazon Ecological Corridor, created in 2002.

The consultative council was created on 2 September 2011.

== Environment ==
The Jutaí-Solimões Ecological Reserve is in the Amazon biome.

The whole area is flat and subject to constant flooding.

Altitudes vary from 20 to 100 metres (66 to 328 ft).

Average annual rainfall is 1,200 millimetres (47 in).

Temperatures vary from 20 to 37 °C (68 to 99 °F) with an average of 25 °C (77 °F).

Vegetation types are typical of the igapó, floodplain and land environments in Amazonia.

The bald uakari (cacajao calvus rubicundus) is protected in the station.

The station contains what may be the world's largest palm grove, with over 30,000 hectares (74,000 acres) of Mauritia flexuosa (buriti palm) trees growing in swamp conditions.

The ecosystem is threatened by overfishing and illegal deforestation.

== Sources ==
- Amazon Biome: protected areas: Coordinated audit, Brasília: Federal Court of Accounts of Brazil, 2014
- CEC Central da Amazônia (in Portuguese), ISA: Instituto Socioambiental
- ESEC de Jutaí-Solimões (in Portuguese), ISA: Instituto Socioambiental
- "Estação Ecológica Jutaí-Solimões", Ambiente Brasil (in Portuguese), 23 June 2010
- Estação Ecológica de Jutaí-Solimões (in Portuguese), Chico Mendes Institute for Biodiversity Conservation
- Unidade de Conservação: Estação Ecológica de Jutaí-Solimões (in Portuguese), MMA: Ministério do Meio Ambiente
