= Lábrea Airport =

Lábrea Airport Aeroporto de Lábrea
- IATA: LBR; ICAO: SWLB; LID: AM0024

Summary
- Airport type: Public
- Serves: Lábrea
- Time zone: BRT−1 (UTC−04:00)
- Elevation AMSL: 74 m / 243 ft
- Coordinates: 07°16′44″S 064°46′10″W

Map
- Location in Brazil

Runways
Direction	Length		Surface
Direction	m	ft	Surface
18/36	1,200	3,937	Asphalt
- Sources: ANAC, DECEA

Lábrea Airport (IATA: LBR, ICAO: SWLB) is the airport serving Lábrea, Brazil.

== Airlines and destinations ==
Airlines	Destinations
Azul Conecta	Coari, Manaus, Porto Velho

== Access ==
The airport is located 5 km (3 mi) from downtown Lábrea.

== See also ==
- List of airports in Brazil
