= Eduardo Gomes International Airport =

Commercial airport serving Manaus, Amazonas state, Brazil

Manaus–Eduardo Gomes International Airport Aeroporto Internacional de Manaus–Eduardo Gomes
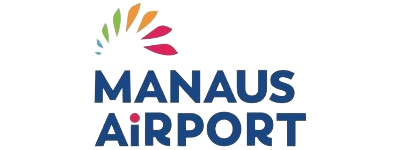

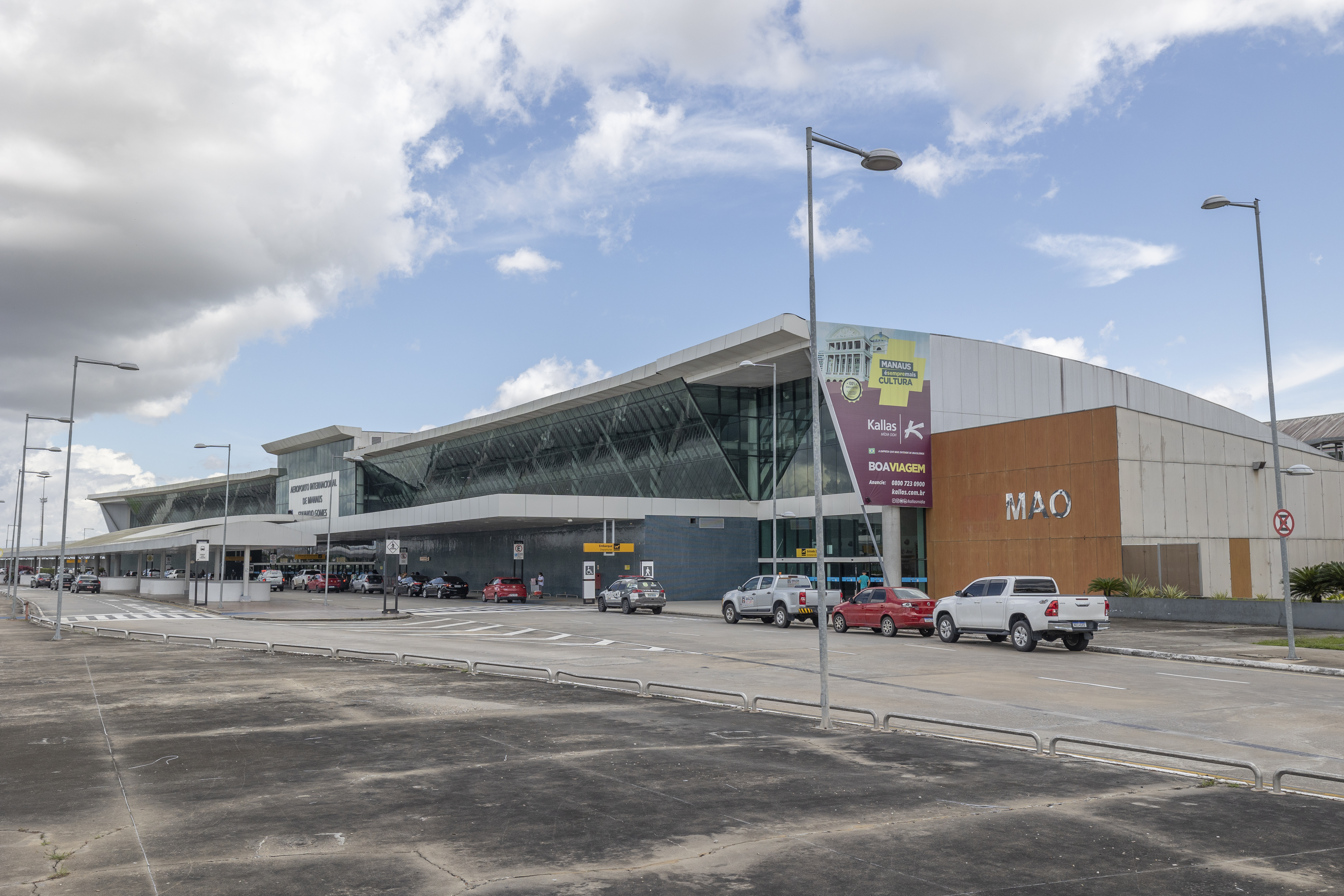
- IATA: MAO; ICAO: SBEG; LID: AM0001

Summary
- Airport type: Public
- Operator: Infraero (1976–2021); Vinci (2021–present)
- Serves: Manaus
- Opened: 31 March 1976; 50 years ago
- Hub for: Apuí Táxi Aéreo; Azul Conecta; Manaus Aerotáxi
- Focus city for: Azul Brazilian Airlines
- Time zone: BRT−1 (UTC−04:00)
- Elevation AMSL: 81 m (266 ft)
- Coordinates: 03°02′28″S 060°03′02″W
- Website: www.airport-manaus.com.br

Map
- Location in Brazil

Runways
Direction	Length		Surface
Direction	m	ft	Surface
11/29	2,700	8,858	Asphalt

Statistics (2025)
- Passengers: 3,181,366 ▲11%
- Aircraft operations: 46,914 ▲7%
- Statistics: Vinci; Sources: Airport Website, ANAC, DECEA

Manaus–Eduardo Gomes International Airport (IATA: MAO, ICAO: SBEG) is an international airport serving Manaus, Amazonas. On 11 December 1973, while still under construction, the name of the facility was changed from Supersonic Airport of Manaus (owing to its design enabling Concorde operations) to Eduardo Gomes International Airport, celebrating the Brazilian politician and military figure Air Marshal Eduardo Gomes (1896–1981).

It is operated by Vinci Airports.

== History ==
Eduardo Gomes International Airport replaced Ponta Pelada Airport as the main public airport of Manaus in 1976. Ponta Pelada was then renamed Manaus Air Force Base and began handling exclusively military operations.

The construction of the airport began in 1972 and it was commissioned on 31 March 1976 by a domestic flight operated by a Boeing 727-100 of Serviços Aéreos Cruzeiro do Sul. At the time it was the most modern airport in Brazil and the first one to operate with jet bridges.

The airport has two passenger terminal buildings. Passenger Terminal 1 handles all domestic and international flights and Passenger Terminal 2, opened on 12 March 1985, handles general aviation. Furthermore, the airport has three cargo terminals, opened in 1976, 1980 and 2004. They have a total area of 49,000 square metres (530,000 sq ft) and can process up to 12,000 t/month of cargo. Cargo Terminals 1 and 2 handle goods for export and Cargo Terminal 3 for import.

On 31 August 2009, Infraero unveiled a BRL793.5 million (US$316.1 million; EUR292.2 million) investment plan to upgrade Eduardo Gomes International Airport focusing on the preparations for the 2014 FIFA World Cup which were held in Brazil, Manaus being one of the venue cities. The investment comprised enlargement of apron and existing runway and enlargement and renovation of the passenger terminal.

Responding to critiques to the situation of its airports, on 18 May 2011, Infraero released a list evaluating some of its most important airports according to its saturation levels. According to the list, Manaus was considered to be in good situation, operating with less than 70% of its capacity.

In terms of cargo handled, in 2024 Manaus was the third-busiest in Brazil, behind São Paulo-Guarulhos and Campinas.

The Brazilian Integrated Air Traffic Control and Air Defense Center section 4 (Cindacta IV) is located in the vicinity of the airport.

Previously operated by Infraero, on April 7, 2021 Vinci SA won a 30-year concession to operate the airport.

== Airlines and destinations ==
=== Passenger ===
Airlines	Destinations
Apuí Táxi Aéreo	Apuí, Manicoré
Avianca	Bogotá
Azul Brazilian Airlines	Belém, Belo Horizonte–Confins, Boa Vista, Campinas, Itaituba, Parintins, Porto Trombetas, Porto Velho, Recife, Rio Branco (begins 12 December 2026), Santarém, São Gabriel da Cachoeira, Tabatinga, Tefé; Charter: Carauari, Porto Urucu
Azul Conecta	Barcelos, Lábrea, Manicoré, Maués
Copa Airlines	Panama City–Tocumen
Gol Linhas Aéreas	Boa Vista (ends 29 January 2027), Brasília, Fortaleza (ends 28 January 2027), Porto Velho, Rio Branco (ends 31 January 2027), Rio de Janeiro–Galeão, Santarém, São Paulo–Guarulhos; Seasonal: Miami
LATAM Brasil	Belém, Brasília, Fortaleza, Rio de Janeiro–Galeão, São Paulo–Guarulhos
TAP Air Portugal	Lisbon

=== Cargo ===
Airlines	Destinations
LATAM Cargo Brasil	São Paulo-Guarulhos
Total Express Linhas Aéreas	São Paulo-Guarulhos

== Statistics ==
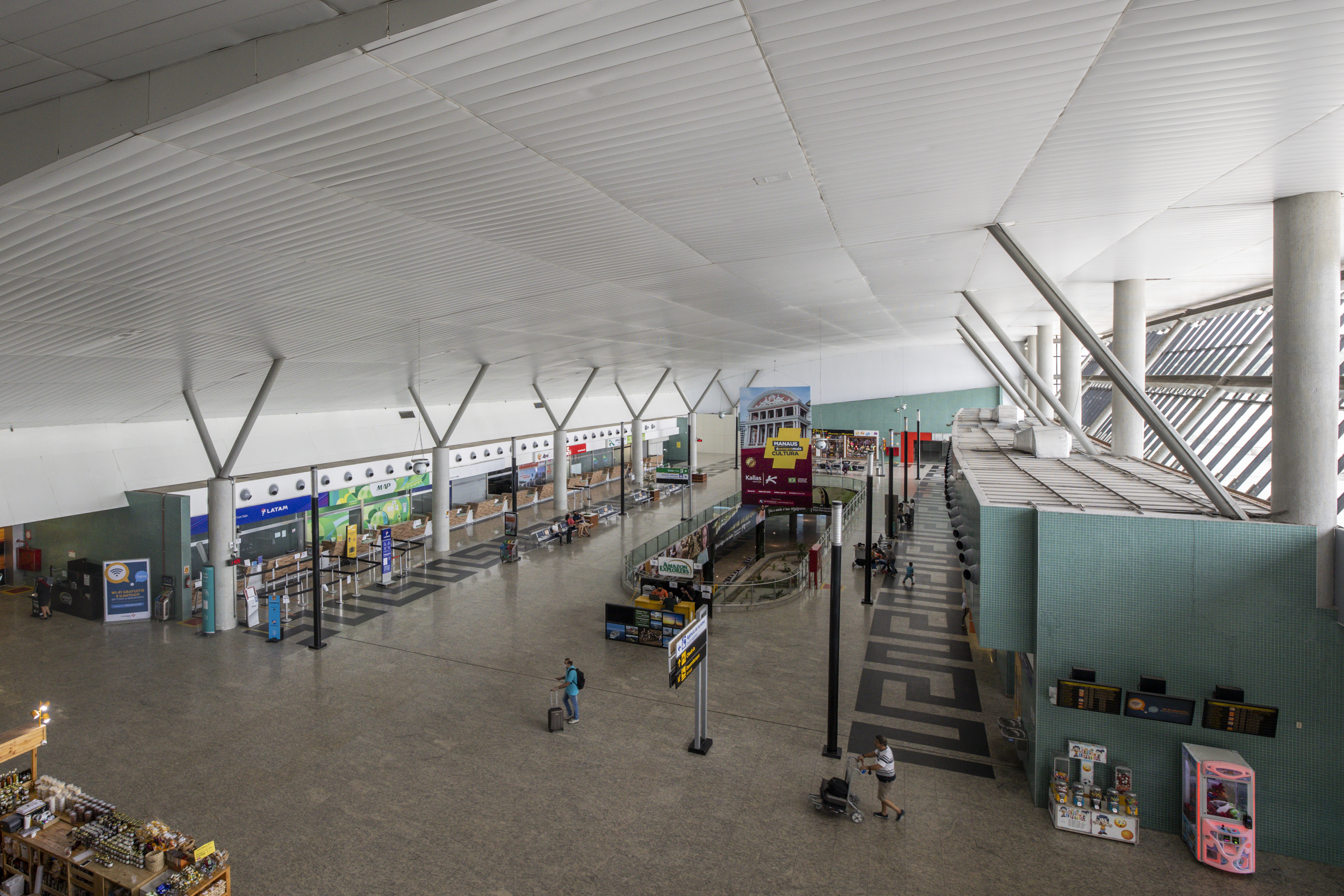
Terminal 1

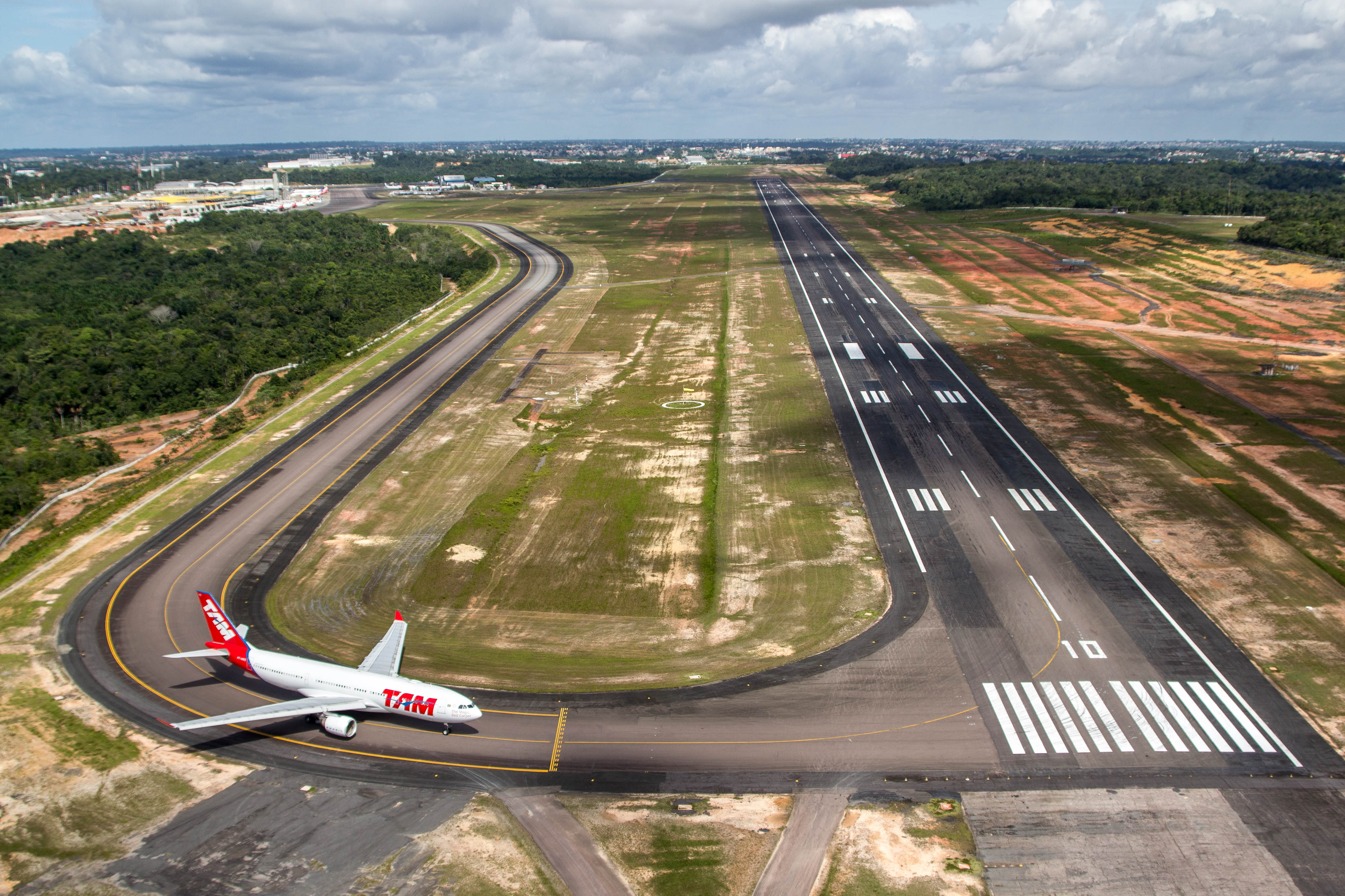
View of runway 11 with TAM Airlines Airbus A330-200

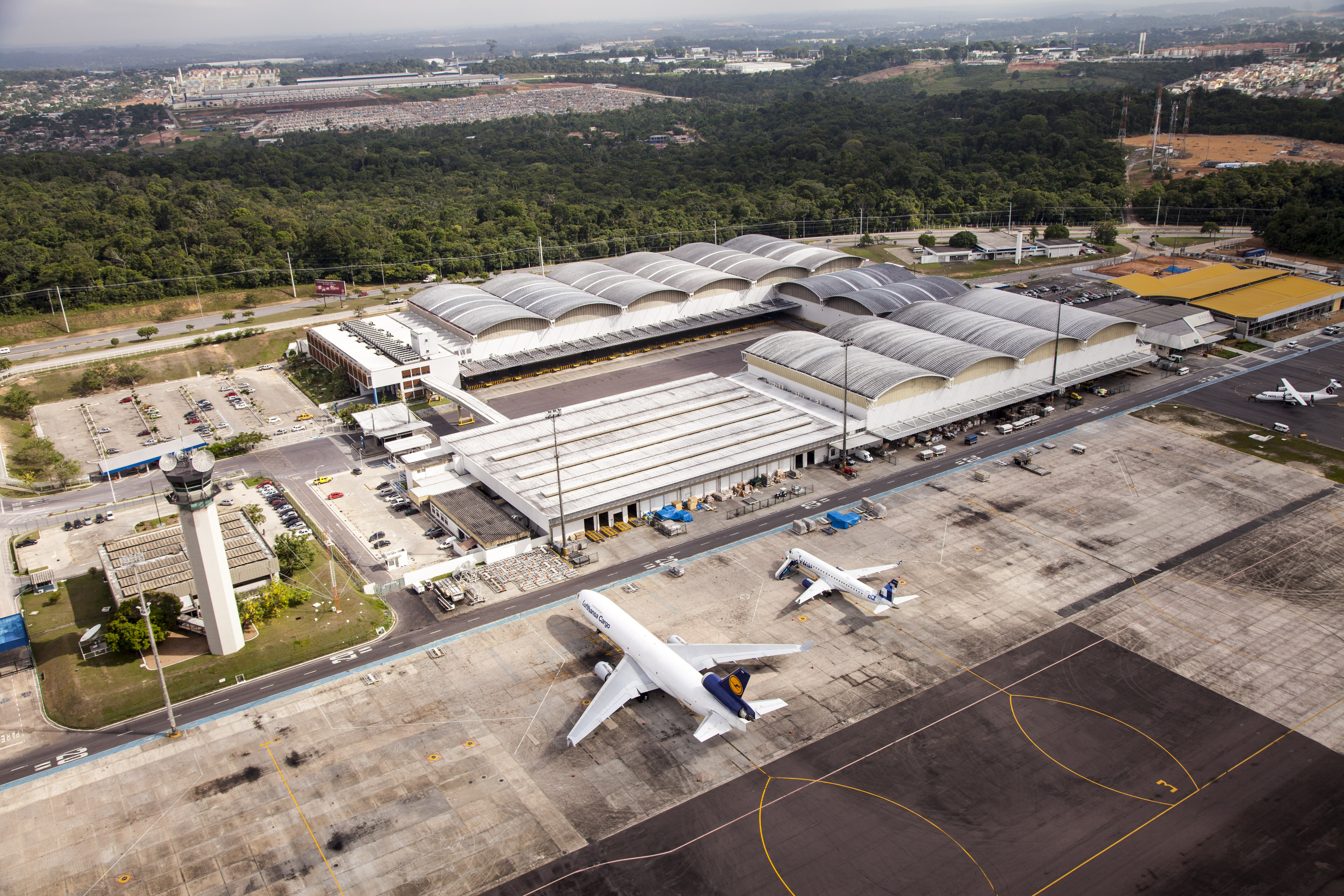
Cargo Terminal

Following are the number of passenger, aircraft and cargo movements at the airport, according to Infraero (2007-2021) and Vinci (2022-2025) reports:

Year	Passenger	Aircraft	Cargo (t)
2025	3,181,366 ▲11%	46,914 ▲7%	
2024	2,854,607 ▲9%	43,759 ▲8%	
2023	2,626,386 ▼4%	40,564 ▼7%	
2022	2,725,184 ▲21%	43,437 ▲10%	
2021	2,258,780 ▲30%	39,367 ▲28%	100,017 ▲7%
2020	1,737,962 ▼43%	30,717 ▼23%	93,330 ▼21%
2019	3,073,231 ▲9%	40,120 ▲2%	117,723 ▲5%
2018	2,827,615 ▲7%	39,199 ▲6%	111,966
2017	2,645,205	37,030 ▼2%	112,510 ▼1%
2016	2,651,452 ▼19%	37,951 ▼22%	113,861 ▼6%
2015	3,258,157 ▼4%	48,433 ▼12%	121,295 ▼22%
2014	3,389,867 ▲10%	54,862 ▼1%	156,329 ▼7%
2013	3,077,077 ▼2%	55,141 ▼4%	168,299 ▲8%
2012	3,131,150 ▲4%	57,575 ▲2%	156,147 ▼6%
2011	3,019,426 ▲12%	56,298 ▲7%	166,610 ▲6%
2010	2,688,623 ▲17%	52,505 ▲15%	157,157 ▲10%
2009	2,300,022 ▲14%	45,852 ▲2%	142,623 ▲1%
2008	2,021,668 ▼2%	44,823 ▲1%	141,618 ▼17%
2007	2,063,872	44,303	170,132

== Accidents and incidents ==
- 21 April 1983: three Libyan Air Force Il-76TDs and a C-130 landed at Manaus airport, after one of the Il-76s developed some technical problems while crossing the Atlantic Ocean. The aircraft were then searched by the Brazilian authorities. While their cargo was officially declared as medical supplies, the planes were carrying the 17 Aero L-39 Albatros jets, together with guns and parachutes, destined for Nicaragua. The cargo was impounded, while the transports were permitted to return to Libya.
- 6 March 1991: a TABA Embraer EMB 110 Bandeirante flying to Manaus was hijacked near São Gabriel da Cachoeira by 3 people.
- 15 December 1994: a TABA Embraer EMB 110 Bandeirante en route from Carauari and Tefé to Manaus was hijacked by two Colombian citizens. The passengers were released in the proximity of Tabatinga and the aircraft was flown to Colombia. The crew was released at the Brazilian Embassy in Bogotá.
- 14 May 2004: Rico Linhas Aéreas Flight 4815 operated by the Embraer EMB 120ER Brasília registration PT-WRO, en route from São Paulo de Olivença and Tefé to Manaus crashed in the forest at about 18 nm from Manaus. All 33 passengers and crew died.

== Access ==
The airport is located 14 km (9 mi) north of downtown Manaus.

== See also ==
- List of airports in Brazil
