= Barreirinha =

Municipality of Amazonas, Brazil

- Municipality
- Flag

- Location in Brazil
- Coordinates: 002°47′34″S 57°04′12″W
- Country: Brazil
- Region: Norte
- State: Amazonas

Population (2020)
  - Total: 33,722
- Time zone: UTC−4 (AMT)

Barreirinha is a municipality located in the Brazilian state of Amazonas. Its population was 33,722 (2022) and its area is 5,751km^{2}.

== Transport ==
The locality is served by the Barreirinha Airport.
