= Cruzeiro do Sul International Airport =

Cruzeiro do Sul International Airport Aeroporto Internacional de Cruzeiro do Sul
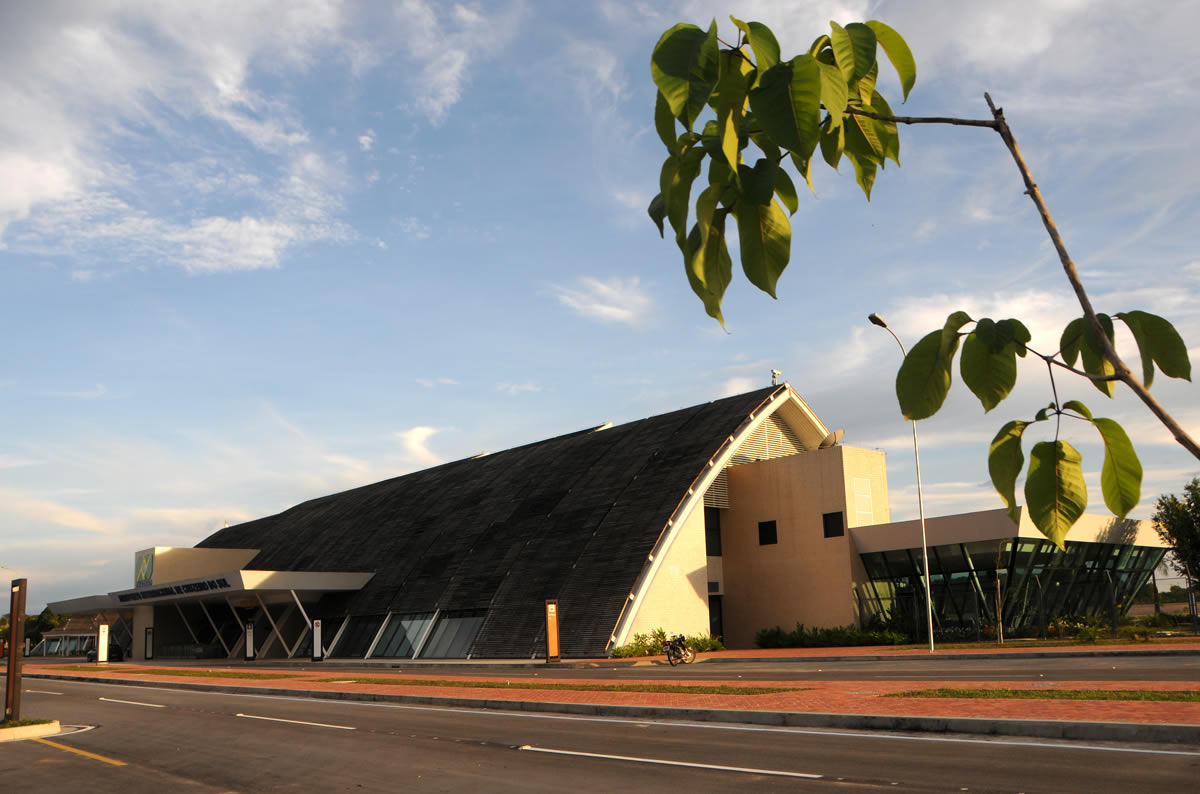
- IATA: CZS; ICAO: SBCZ; LID: AC0002

Summary
- Airport type: Public
- Operator: Infraero (1980–2021); Vinci (2021–present)
- Serves: Cruzeiro do Sul
- Opened: October 28, 1970
- Time zone: BRT−2 (UTC−05:00)
- Elevation AMSL: 194 m (636 ft)
- Coordinates: 07°35′58″S 072°46′10″W
- Website: www.cruzeirodosul-airport.com.br

Map
- Location in Brazil

Runways
Direction	Length		Surface
Direction	m	ft	Surface
10/28	2,400	7,874	Asphalt

Statistics (2025)
- Passengers: 74,432 ▲87%
- Aircraft Operations: 6,962 ▲12%
- Statistics: Vinci; Sources: Airport Website, ANAC, DECEA

Cruzeiro do Sul International Airport (IATA: CZS, ICAO: SBCZ) is the airport serving Cruzeiro do Sul, Brazil. It is the westernmost Brazilian airport served by scheduled flights.

It is operated by Vinci SA.

== History ==
The airport was commissioned on October 28, 1970.

Previously operated by Infraero, on April 7, 2021 Vinci SA won a 30-year concession to operate the airport.

== Airlines and destinations ==
Airlines	Destinations
Gol Linhas Aéreas	Rio Branco

== Accidents and incidents ==
- 22 June 1992: a VASP cargo Boeing 737-2A1C registration PP-SND en route from Rio Branco to Cruzeiro do Sul crashed in the jungle while on arrival procedures to Cruzeiro do Sul. The crew of 2 and 1 occupant died.
- 29 October 2009: a Brazilian Air Force Cessna 208 Caravan registration FAB-2725 en route from Cruzeiro do Sul to Tabatinga made an emergency landing on a river due engine failure. Of the 11 occupants, 1 passenger and 1 crew member died.

== Access ==
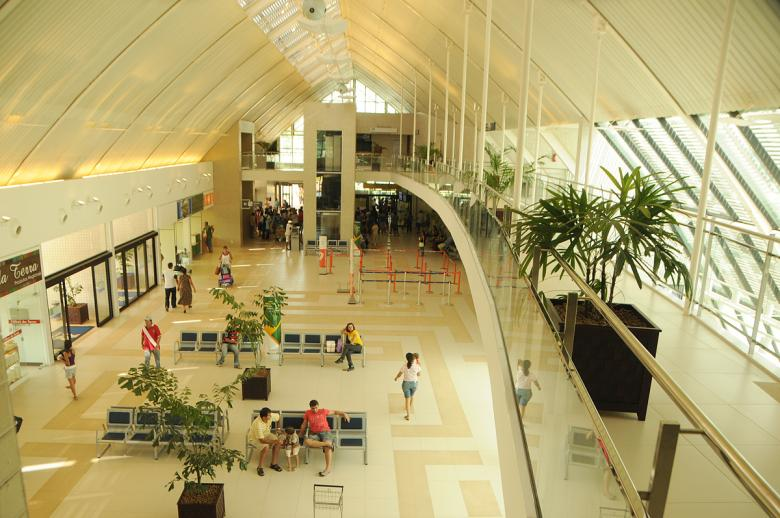
Inside the airport terminal

The airport is located 14 km (9 mi) from downtown Cruzeiro do Sul.

== See also ==
- List of airports in Brazil
