= Ipiranga Airport =

Ipiranga Airport Aeroporto do Ipiranga
- IATA: IPG; ICAO: SWII; LID: AM0013

Summary
- Airport type: Public
- Serves: Santo Antônio do Içá
- Time zone: BRT−1 (UTC−04:00)
- Elevation AMSL: 67 m (220 ft)
- Coordinates: 02°56′25″S 69°41′39″W

Map
- Location in Brazil

Runways
Direction	Length		Surface
Direction	m	ft	Surface
01/19	1,500	4,921	Concrete
- Sources: ANAC, DECEA

Ipiranga Airport (IATA: IPG, ICAO: SWII) is the airport serving Santo Antônio do Içá, Brazil.

== Access ==
The airport is located 3 km (2 mi) from downtown Santo Antônio do Içá.

== See also ==
- List of airports in Brazil
