= Presidente Médici International Airport =

Former airport that served Rio Branco, Brazil (1973–1999)

Presidente Médici International Airport Aeroporto Internacional Presidente Médici
- IATA: ~~RBR~~; ICAO: none

Summary
- Airport type: Defunct
- Operator: Infraero (1979–1999)
- Serves: Rio Branco
- Opened: 1973
- Closed: 16 November 1999
- Coordinates: 09°59′31″S 067°48′17″W

Map
- Location in Brazil

Runways
Direction	Length		Surface
Direction	ft	m	Surface
	~~8,530~~	~~2,600~~	~~Asphalt~~ (closed)
- Demolished, no longer operational.

Presidente Médici International Airport ~~(IATA: RBR)~~ was an airport that served Rio Branco, Brazil from 1973 until 1999. The facility was closed one day before the opening of Plácido de Castro International Airport.

== History ==
Pres. Médici International Airport was the first airport of Rio Branco, Brazil. Because of its proximity to the urban center and a legal dispute concerning ownership of the land where it was located, the airport was closed on November 16, 1999, when Plácido de Castro International Airport was opened at another location.

Today the former runway is now used as Amadeu Barbosa Avenue and at one of its end is located the main football stadium of Rio Branco, called Arena da Floresta. The former passenger terminal and control tower were demolished in 2021, after being for many years derelict.

The following airlines once served the airport: Cruzeiro do Sul, Varig, VASP

== Accidents and incidents ==
- September 28, 1971: a Cruzeiro do Sul Douglas DC-3 A-414A registration PP-CBV crashed after take-off from Sena Madureira bound to Rio Branco. The aircraft suffered an engine failure at climb-out. The pilot tried to return to the airport but because the turn was done at very low altitude, the right wing struck trees causing the aircraft to crash. All 32 passengers and crew died.

== Access ==
The airport was located 2 km (1 mi) south of downtown Rio Branco.
