= Carauari Airport =

Carauari Airport Aeroporto de Carauari
- IATA: CAF; ICAO: SWCA; LID: AM0007

Summary
- Airport type: Public
- Serves: Carauari
- Time zone: BRT−1 (UTC−04:00)
- Elevation AMSL: 108 m / 354 ft
- Coordinates: 04°52′17″S 066°53′51″W

Map
- Location in Brazil

Runways
Direction	Length		Surface
Direction	m	ft	Surface
04/22	1,665	5,463	Asphalt
- Sources: ANAC, DECEA

Carauari Airport (IATA: CAF, ICAO: SWCA) is the airport serving Carauari, Brazil.

== Airlines and destinations ==
Airlines	Destinations
Azul Brazilian Airlines	Charter: Manaus, Porto Urucu

== Accidents and incidents ==
On 15 December 1994, a TABA Embraer EMB 110 Bandeirante en route from Carauari and Tefé to Manaus was hijacked by two Colombian citizens. The passengers were released in the proximity of Tabatinga and the aircraft was flown to Colombia. The crew was released at the Brazilian Embassy in Bogotá.

== Access ==
The airport is located 1 km (1 mi) from downtown Carauari.

== See also ==
- List of airports in Brazil
