= Itaituba Airport =

Airport in Pará, Brazil

Itaituba Airport Aeroporto de Itaituba
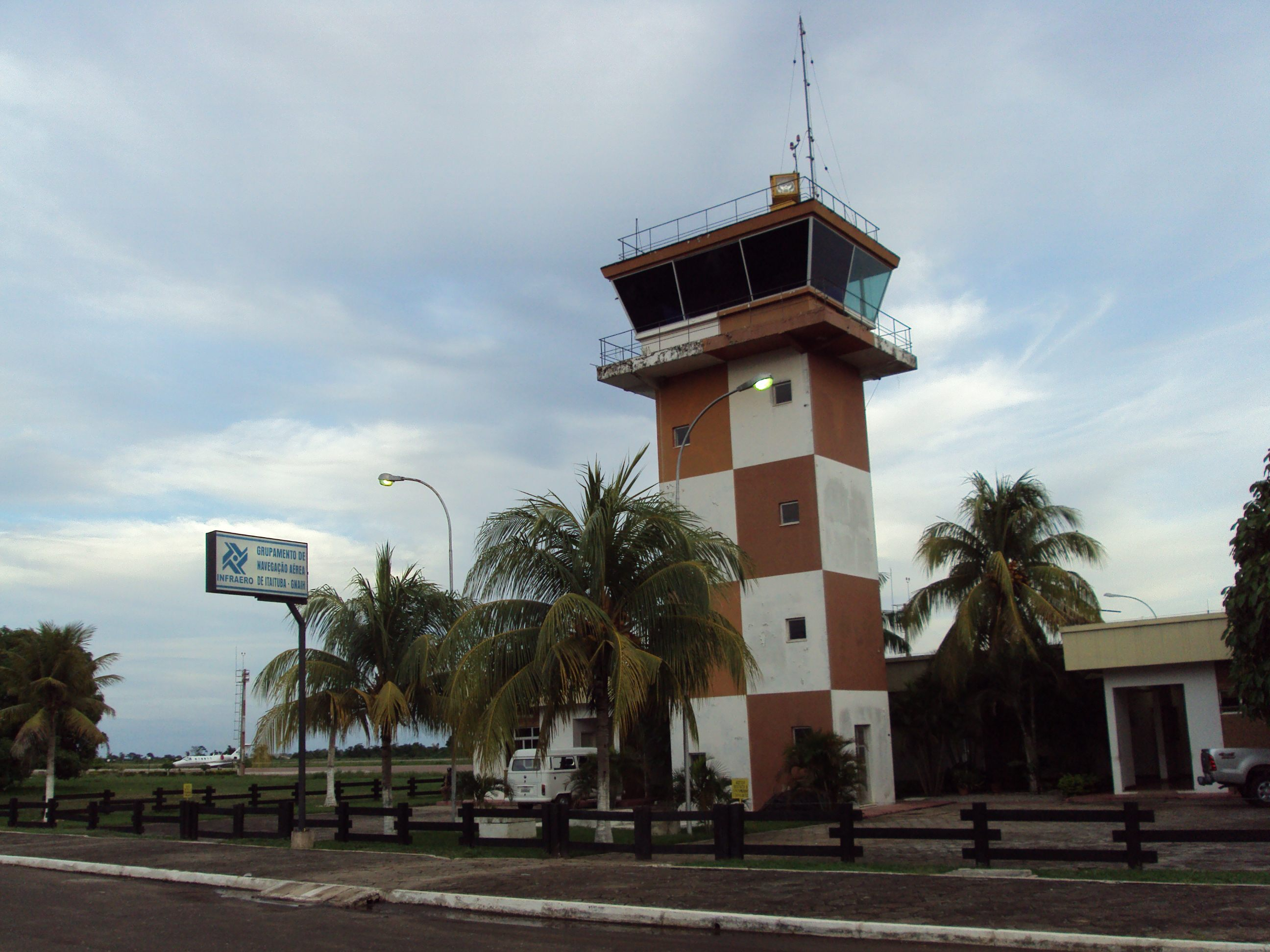
- IATA: ITB; ICAO: SBIH; LID: PA0010

Summary
- Airport type: Public
- Serves: Itaituba
- Time zone: BRT (UTC−03:00)
- Elevation AMSL: 31 m (102 ft)
- Coordinates: 04°14′32″S 056°00′03″W

Map
- Location in Brazil ITB (Brazil)

Runways
Direction	Length		Surface
Direction	m	ft	Surface
06/24	1,700	5,266	Asphalt
- Sources: ANAC, DECEA

Itaituba Airport (IATA: ITB, ICAO: SBIH) is the airport serving Itaituba, Brazil.

== History ==
Itaituba is one of the most important airports in the southwest region of the state of Pará, being classified as a regional airport. It is served by regular flights. In addition, air taxi companies offer flights to small villages and localities farther away from the city urban area, as well as to several gold mining spots and neighboring cities.

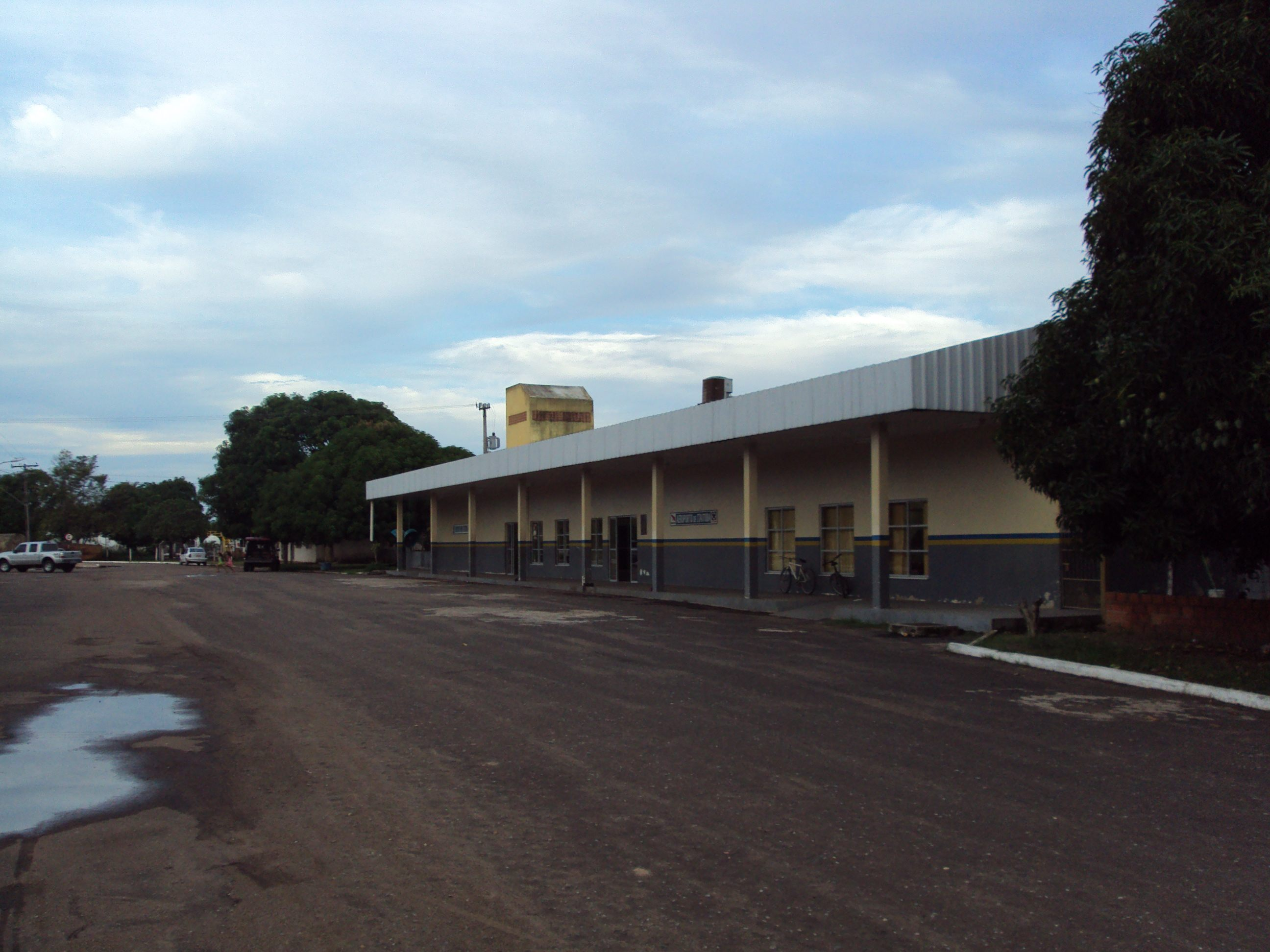
Itaituba Airport Terminal

== Airlines and destinations ==
Airlines	Destinations
Azul Brazilian Airlines	Manaus

== Accidents and incidents ==
- 26 April 1994: a Penta Cessna 208A Caravan registration PP-OGI flying from Itaituba to Jacareacanga under poor visibility and below minimums crashed shortly before touch-down at Jacareacanga partly due to the pilot's lack of experience. The crew of 2 died.
- 22 October 1994: a TABA DHC-8-300 was hijacked by thieves, who stole a load of gold that had as destination the city of Belém, Pará.

== Access ==
The airport is located 6 km (4 mi) from downtown Itaituba.

== See also ==
- List of airports in Brazil
