= Coari Airport =

Airport serving Coari, Brazil

Coari Airport Aeroporto de Coari
- IATA: CIZ; ICAO: SWKO; LID: AM0010

Summary
- Airport type: Public
- Serves: Coari
- Time zone: BRT−1 (UTC−04:00)
- Elevation AMSL: 46 m (151 ft)
- Coordinates: 04°08′03″S 063°07′57″W

Map
- Location in Brazil

Runways
Direction	Length		Surface
Direction	m	ft	Surface
10/28	1,600	5,249	Asphalt
- Sources: ANAC, DECEA

Coari Airport (IATA: CIZ, ICAO: SWKO) is the airport serving Coari, Brazil.

== Airlines and destinations ==
Airlines	Destinations
Azul Conecta	Lábrea

== Access ==
The airport is located 6 km (4 mi) from downtown Coari.

== See also ==
- List of airports in Brazil
