= São Gabriel da Cachoeira Airport =

São Gabriel da Cachoeira Airport Aeroporto de São Gabriel da Cachoeira
- IATA: SJL; ICAO: SBUA; LID: AM0003

Summary
- Airport type: Public/Military
- Serves: São Gabriel da Cachoeira
- Time zone: BRT−1 (UTC−04:00)
- Elevation AMSL: 76 m (249 ft)
- Coordinates: 00°08′53″S 066°59′09″W

Map
- Location in Brazil

Runways
Direction	Length		Surface
Direction	m	ft	Surface
05/23	2,600	8,530	Asphalt
- Sources: ANAC, DECEA

São Gabriel da Cachoeira Airport (IATA: SJL, ICAO: SBUA), also called Uaupés Airport, is the airport serving São Gabriel da Cachoeira, Brazil.

== Airlines and destinations ==
Airlines	Destinations
Azul Brazilian Airlines	Manaus

== Accidents and incidents ==
- 6 March 1991: a TABA Embraer EMB 110 Bandeirante flying to Manaus was hijacked near São Gabriel da Cachoeira by 3 persons.

== Access ==
The airport is located 15 km (9 mi) from downtown São Gabriel da Cachoeira.

== See also ==
- List of airports in Brazil
