= Manicoré Airport =

Manicoré Airport Aeroporto de Manicoré
- IATA: MNX; ICAO: SBMY; LID: AM0015

Summary
- Airport type: Public
- Serves: Manicoré
- Time zone: BRT−1 (UTC−04:00)
- Elevation AMSL: 53 m (174 ft)
- Coordinates: 05°48′40″S 061°16′42″W

Map
- Location in Brazil

Runways
Direction	Length		Surface
Direction	m	ft	Surface
05/23	1,265	4,150	Asphalt
- Sources: ANAC, DECEA

Manicoré Airport (IATA: MNX, ICAO: SBMY) is the airport serving Manicoré, Brazil.

== Airlines and destinations ==
Airlines	Destinations
Apuí Táxi Aéreo	Apuí, Manaus
Azul Conecta	Manaus

== Access ==
The airport is located 4 km (2 mi) from downtown Manicoré.

== See also ==
- List of airports in Brazil
