= Barreirinha Airport =

Barreirinha Airport Aeroporto de Barreirinha
- IATA: none; ICAO: SJ9A; LID: AM0111

Summary
- Airport type: Private
- Serves: Barreirinha
- Time zone: BRT−1 (UTC−04:00)
- Elevation AMSL: 14 m (46 ft)
- Coordinates: 02°47′31″S 057°03′29″W

Map
- Location in Brazil

Runways
Direction	Length		Surface
Direction	m	ft	Surface
07/25	1,100	3,609	Asphalt
- Sources: ANAC, DECEA

Barreirinha Airport (ICAO: SJ9A) formerly SWBI, is the airport serving Barreirinha, Brazil.

== Access ==
The airport is located 3 km (2 mi) from downtown Barreirinha.

== See also ==
- List of airports in Brazil
