= Senadora Eunice Michiles Airport =

Senadora Eunice Michiles Airport Aeroporto Senadora Eunice Michiles
- IATA: OLC; ICAO: SDCG; LID: AM0016

Summary
- Airport type: Public
- Serves: São Paulo de Olivença
- Time zone: BRT−2 (UTC−05:00)
- Elevation AMSL: 102 m (335 ft)
- Coordinates: 03°28′09″S 068°55′16″W

Map
- Location in Brazil

Runways
Direction	Length		Surface
Direction	m	ft	Surface
04/22	1,200	3,937	Concrete
- Sources: ANAC, DECEA

Senadora Eunice Michiles Airport (IATA: OLC, ICAO: SDCG) is the airport serving São Paulo de Olivença, Brazil. It is named after Eunice Michiles, the first Brazilian woman to be elected to the Senate.

== Access ==
The airport is located 3 km (2 mi) from downtown São Paulo de Olivença.

== See also ==
- List of airports in Brazil
