= Tefé Airport =

Pref. Orlando Marinho Airport Aeroporto Pref. Orlando Marinho
- IATA: TFF; ICAO: SBTF; LID: AM0004

Summary
- Airport type: Public
- Operator: Infraero (1980–2021); Vinci (2021–present)
- Serves: Tefé
- Time zone: BRT−1 (UTC−04:00)
- Elevation AMSL: 57 m (187 ft)
- Coordinates: 03°22′49″S 064°43′31″W
- Website: www.tefe-airport.com.br

Map
- Location in Brazil

Runways
Direction	Length		Surface
Direction	m	ft	Surface
15/33	2,200	7,218	Asphalt

Statistics (2025)
- Passengers: 47,231 ▲7%
- Aircraft Operations: 3,721 ▲14%
- Statistics: Vinci; Sources: Airport Website, ANAC, DECEA

Tefé Airport (IATA: TFF, ICAO: SBTF) is the airport serving Tefé, Brazil. It is named after Orlando Marinho (1925–2018), a former mayor of Tefé.

It is operated by Vinci SA.

== History ==
Operated by Infraero since 1980, on April 7, 2021 Vinci SA won a 30-year concession to operate the airport.

Tefé Airport

== Airlines and destinations ==
Airlines	Destinations
Azul Brazilian Airlines	Manaus, Tabatinga

== Accidents and incidents ==
- 15 December 1994: a TABA Embraer EMB 110 Bandeirante en route from Carauari and Tefé to Manaus was hijacked by two Colombian citizens. The passengers were released in the proximity of Tabatinga and the aircraft was flown to Colombia. The crew was released at the Brazilian Embassy in Bogotá.

== Access ==
The airport is located 5 km (3 mi) from downtown Tefé.

== See also ==
- List of airports in Brazil
