= Santo Antônio do Içá =

Municipality of Amazonas, Brazil

- Municipality
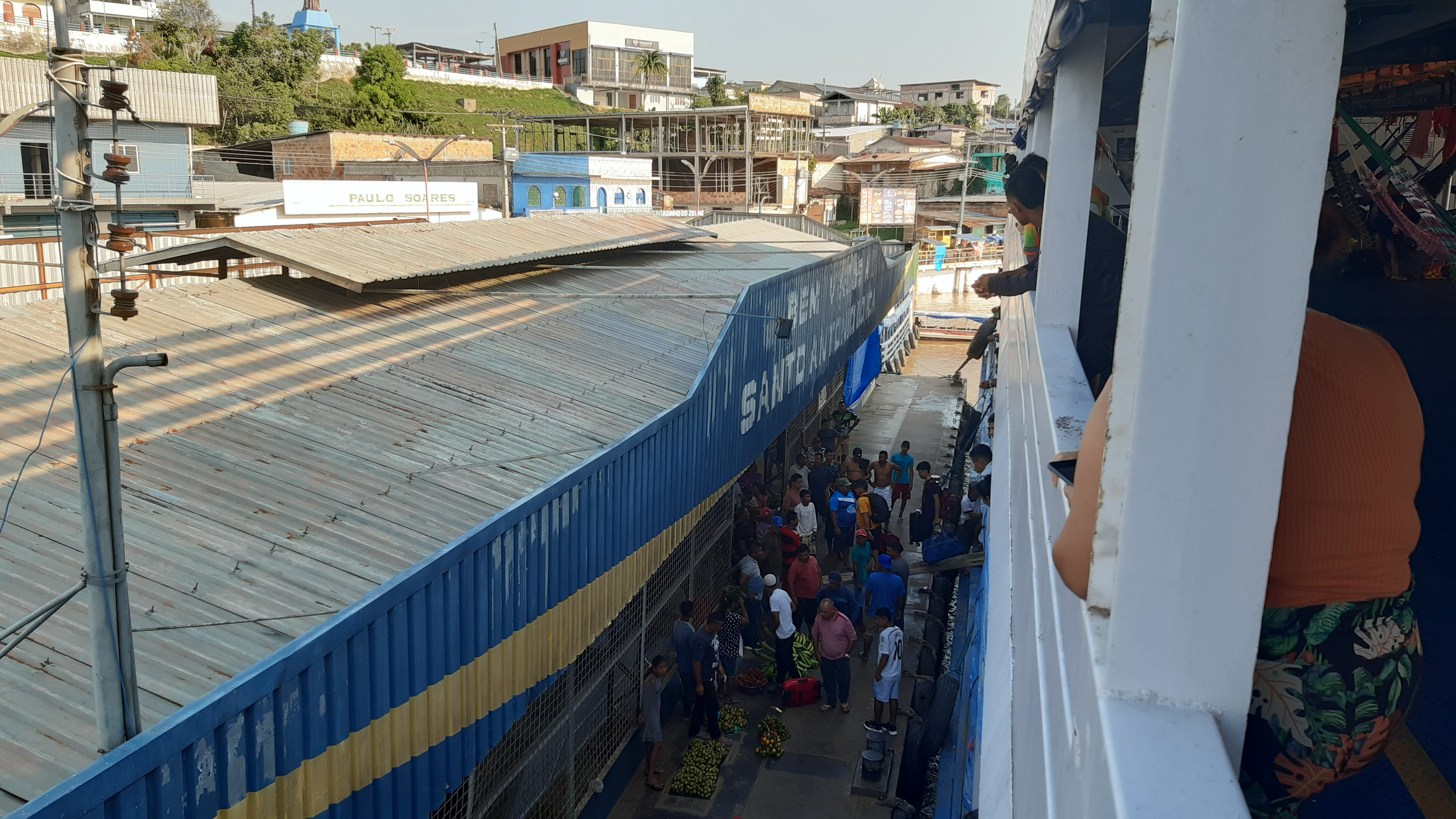
- View from the ship F/B Vitória Régia in 2024

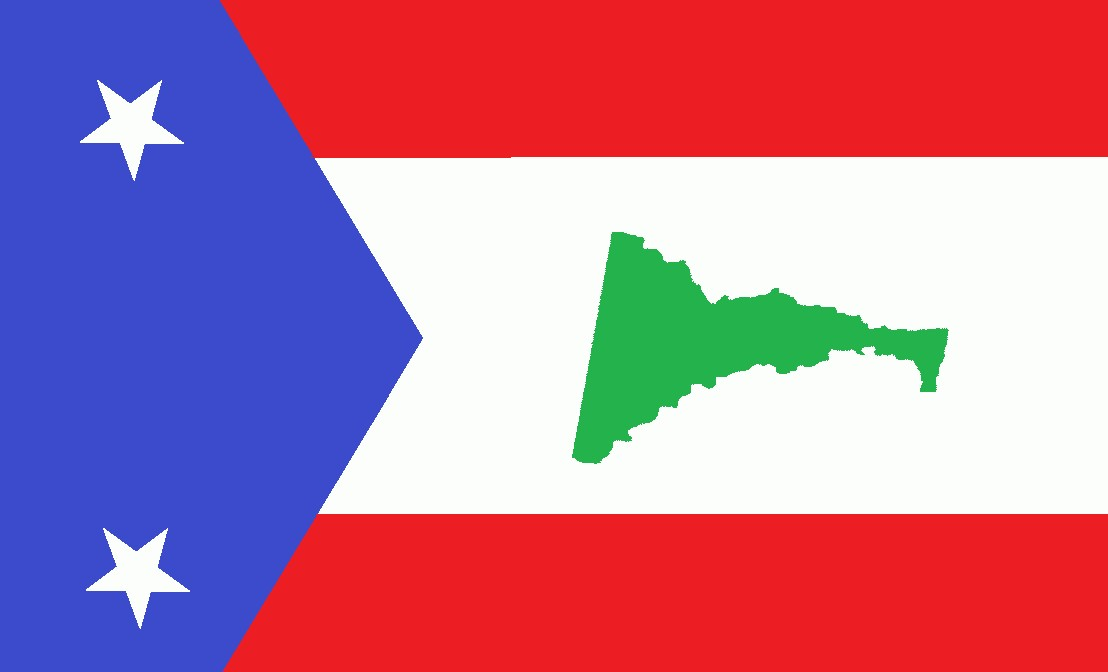
- Flag

- Location in Amazonas state

- Location in Brazil
- Coordinates: 3°6′7″S 67°56′24″W
- Country: Brazil
- Region: North
- State: Amazonas
- Microregion: Alto Solimões

Area
  - Total: 12,307 km^{2} (4,752 sq mi)

Population (2020)
  - Total: 21,243
  - Density: 1.7261/km^{2} (4.4706/sq mi)
- Time zone: UTC−4 (AMT)
- Postal code: 69680-xxx
- Area code: +55 97

Santo Antônio do Içá is a community and a municipality in the state of Amazonas near the Colombian border in Brazil. The population is 21,243 (2020 est.) in an area of 12,307 km^{2}. The municipality was created in 1955 out of São Paulo de Olivença. The city is served by Ipiranga Airport.

The municipality contains the 15,000-hectare (37,000-acre) Javari-Buriti Area of Relevant Ecological Interest, created in 1985. It contains parts of the Jutaí-Solimões Ecological Station.
