= São Paulo de Olivença =

Municipality of Amazonas, Brazil

- Municipality
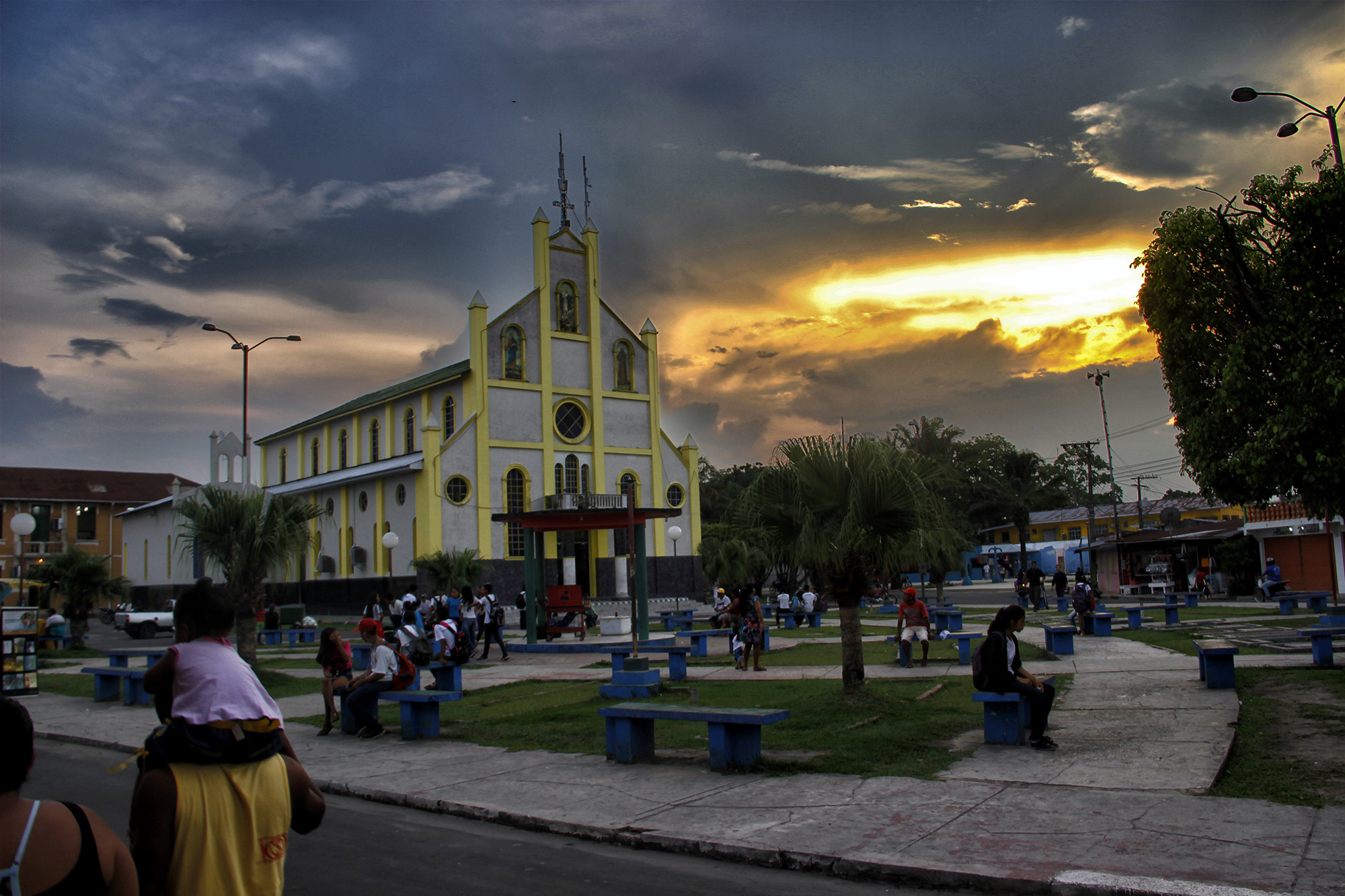
- São Paulo de Olivença

- Location in Amazonas state

- Location in Brazil
- Coordinates: 3°27′34″S 68°56′0″W
- Country: Brazil
- Region: North
- State: Amazonas
- Microregion: Alto Solimões

Area
  - Total: 19,746 km^{2} (7,624 sq mi)

Population (2020)
  - Total: 40,073
  - Density: 2.0294/km^{2} (5.2562/sq mi)
- Time zone: UTC−5 (ACT)
- Postal code: 69600-xxx

São Paulo de Olivença is a community and a municipality near the western edge of the state of Amazonas near the tri-country border area in Brazil. The population is 40,073 (2020 est.) in an area of 19,746 km^{2}. The city is served by Senadora Eunice Michiles Airport. This city, along with other surrounding cities, is known for their sand export for the making of cement.

== History ==
It was founded in 1689 as a mission by Spanish Jesuit Samuel Fritz. The municipality of Santo Antônio do Içá, located to the north, was separated from this municipality in 1955. In 2010, the city suffered from a severe landslide, causing road damage. No one was injured or killed, but many homes were lost in the Amazon River.
