= Tarauacá Airport =

José Galera dos Santos Airport Aeroporto José Galera dos Santos
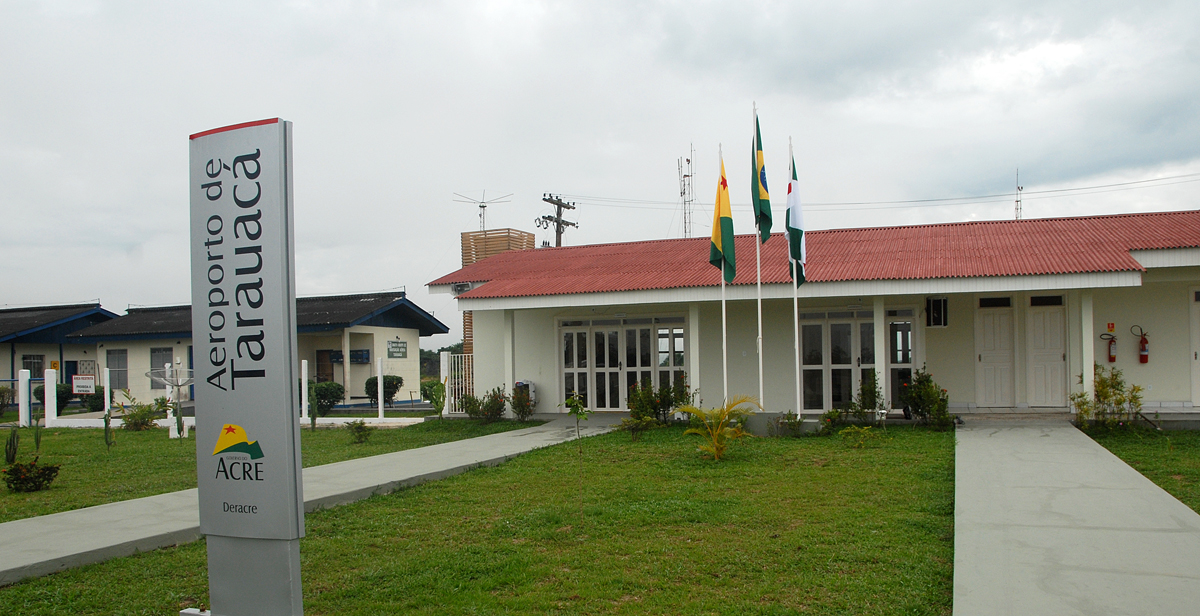
- IATA: TRQ; ICAO: SBTK; LID: AC0004

Summary
- Airport type: Public
- Operator: Deracre
- Serves: Tarauacá
- Time zone: BRT−2 (UTC−05:00)
- Elevation AMSL: 197 m (646 ft)
- Coordinates: 08°09′17″S 070°46′58″W

Map
- Location in Brazil

Runways
Direction	Length		Surface
Direction	m	ft	Surface
14/32	1,130	3,707	Asphalt
- Sources: ANAC, DECEA

José Galera dos Santos Airport (IATA: TRQ, ICAO: SBTK) is the airport serving Tarauacá, Brazil.

It is operated by Deracre (Department of Roads, Hidro and Air Infrastructure of the State of Acre).

== History ==
In December 2009, due to operational problems, the airport was temporarily closed. Consequently, the only way to reach the city of Tarauacá by air was via Feijó Airport, located 45 km away from the urban area of Tarauacá. Tarauacá was opened again on August 19, 2010 after undergoing a major renovation.

== Access ==
The airport is located 3 km (2 mi) from downtown Tarauacá.

== See also ==
- List of airports in Brazil
