= Abaeté Aviação =

Domestic airline based in Salvador da Bahia, Brazil

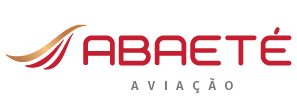
IATA	ICAO	Call sign
E4	ABJ	ABAETÉ
- Founded: February 19, 1979; 47 years ago (as Aerotáxi Abaeté)
- Commenced operations: February 19, 1979; 47 years ago (as Aerotáxi Abaeté); December 15, 2020; 5 years ago (as Abaeté Aviação)
- AOC #: 10,207 - January 6, 2023
- Hubs: Deputado Luís Eduardo Magalhães International Airport
- Subsidiaries: Abaeté Linhas Aéreas (now defunct)
- Fleet size: 12 (as of November 2024)
- Destinations: 4 (as of November 2024)
- Headquarters: Salvador da Bahia, Brazil
- Key people: Héctor Hamada (CEO)
- Founders: Milton Tosto; Jorge Mello
- Website: www.voeabaete.com.br

Aerotáxi Abaeté (ATA), known as Abaeté Aviação, is a domestic subregional airline and air taxi headquartered in Salvador da Bahia, Brazil. Although the company was established in 1979, it was not authorized to operate regular flights until 2020.

== History ==
=== Aerotáxi Abaeté (1979-2020) ===
==== Establishment ====
The history of Abaeté Aviação dates back to February 19, 1979, when Bahian pilots Milton Tosto and Jorge Mello created Aerotáxi Abaeté (ATA), with the aim of providing air service in locations that were not served by commercial aviation. His first plane was a single-engine Piper PA-28 Cherokee, registration PT-DSM (MSN 28R-7135092), used to transport passengers and cargo between the capital and cities in the interior of Bahia.

In 1985, it acquired Atlanta Táxi Aéreo, expanding its operations.

==== Abaeté Linhas Aéreas ====
Ten years later, in 1995, the air taxi took its first big step; with the acquisition of Nordeste Linhas Aéreas by Rio Sul Serviços Aéreos Regionais (Rio-Sul), a regional airline owned by Varig, the company added larger aircraft and stopped flying to several cities in Bahia, giving rise to Abaeté Linhas Aéreas, an airline subsidiary of Aerotáxi Abaeté.

Abaeté Linhas Aéreas began its operations flying with two 14-seat Embraer EMB 110 Bandeirante between Dois de Julho International Airport (now renamed as Deputado Luís Eduardo Magalhães International Airport or simply Salvador Bahia Airport) and the cities of Bom Jesus da Lapa, Caravelas, Teixeira de Freitas and Guanambi. In 2002, due to low demand, it stopped flying to Caravelas.

In 2006, Abaeté added a third Embraer Bandeirante to the commercial fleet and began flying between Salvador and Barreiras, extending the route to the federal capital Brasília. However, two years later, due to the Great Recession, which resulted in increased costs and uncertainty about the future, the airline decided to optimize its operations, withdrawing one of the three planes and maintaining flights only to Bom Jesus da Lapa and Guanambi.

In February 2012, after reporting monthly losses of R$100 thousand (US$57,000), Abaeté Linhas Aéreas announced the suspension of its regular commercial operations. The operations of its parent company, Aerotáxi Abaeté, however, were not affected.

=== Abaeté Aviação (2020-present) ===
After an eight-year hiatus following the end of Abaeté Linhas Aéreas, in 2020, Aerotáxi Abaeté (ATA), with changes to the Brazilian Civil Aviation Regulations (RBAC), became able to carry out regular passenger flights with aircraft with up to 19 seats. Authorization was granted by the National Civil Aviation Agency of Brazil (ANAC) on March 6, 2020, through an ordinance published in the Diário Oficial da União (DOU), the official journal of the federal government of Brazil.

On October 2, 2020, Aerotáxi Abaeté presented its visual and commercial identity, changing its name to Abaeté Aviação. The announcement was made both through the airline's social networks and its managing partner, Tiago Tosto, who signaled that news was coming, generating speculation about the return of regular commercial flights.

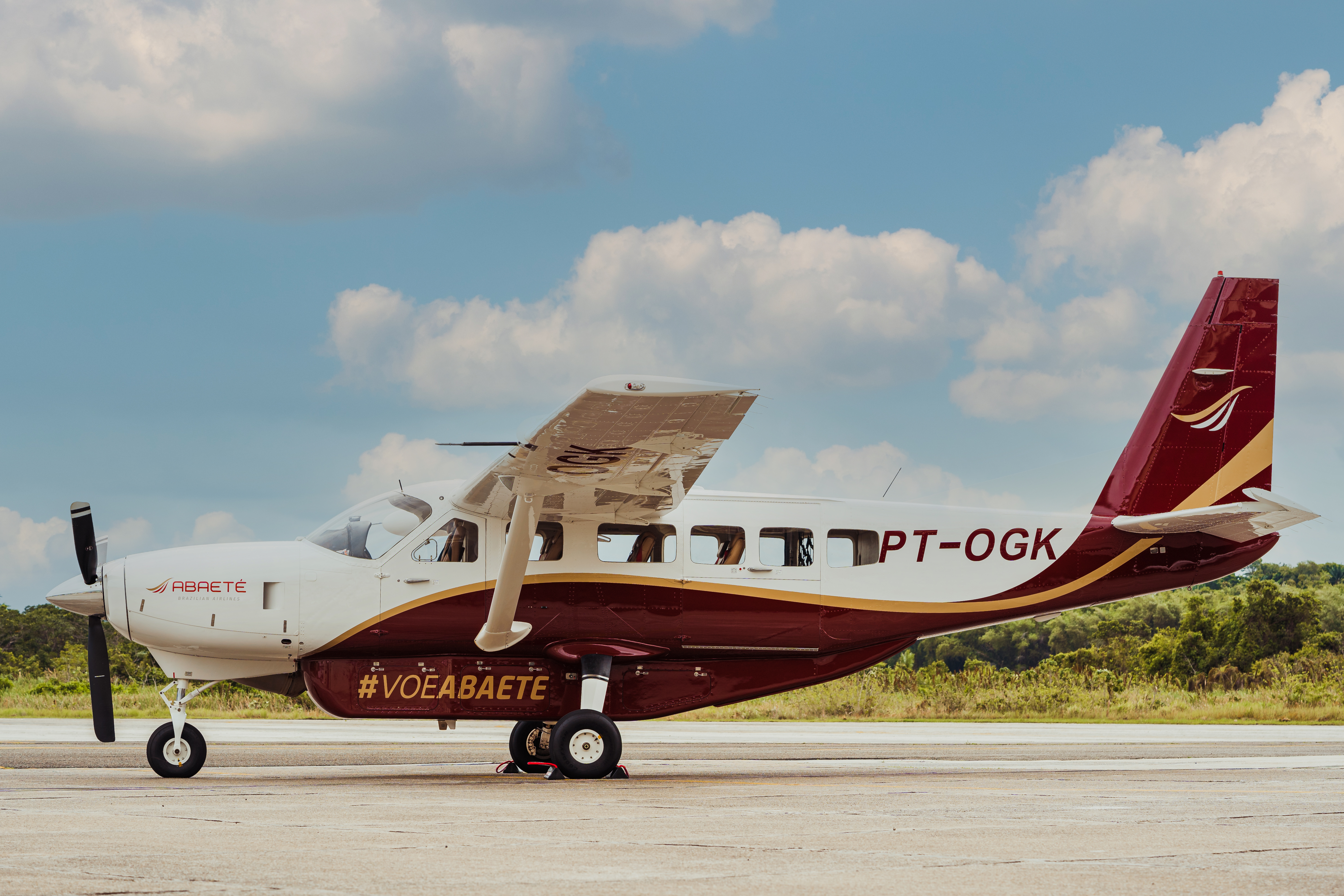
Cessna 208 Caravan reg. PT-OGK, used on regular commercial flights

On October 24, 2020, Abaeté Aviação confirmed the launch of regular commercial flights, starting the sale of its first destination from Salvador da Bahia, the tourist city of Morro de São Paulo, with a daily flight starting on December 18, 2020, that will be operated by its fleet of single-engine turboprops Cessna 208 Caravan.

On November 4, 2020, Abaeté Aviação was announced as the newest associate member of the Brazilian Association of Airlines (ABEAR), along with two more subregional airlines, ASTA Linhas Aéreas and Rio Madeira Aerotáxi (RIMA).

On April 14, 2021, Abaeté Aviação announced its intention to fly to three more destinations in the interior of Bahia, Boipeba, Maraú (from December 17, 2021) and Mucugê (from June 17, 2021). It also announced the hiring of Héctor Hamada, former CEO of MAP Linhas Aéreas, as its new chief executive officer.

In June 2021, the regional airline received the IATA Standard Safety Assessment (ISSA) certification, a voluntary program that is based on the IATA Operational Safety Audit (IOSA), developed to verify internal controls and operational management of smaller airlines. At the same time, the Latin American and Caribbean Air Transport Association (ALTA) announced Abaeté Aviação as its new member.

==== Partnership with GOL Linhas Aéreas ====
On August 26, 2022, GOL Linhas Aéreas announced the signing of a codeshare agreement with Abaeté Aviação to commercialize routes connecting Salvador da Bahia to cities in the interior and coast of Bahia, allowing its passengers to easily connect from any region of Brazil with Morro de São Paulo, Mucugê, Boipeba and Maraú. According to the newspaper Valor Econômico, the regional airline would also be negotiating a similar agreement with LATAM Airlines.

On December 14, 2023, Abaeté launched the route between Salvador da Bahia and Boipeba, which became its fifth regular destination in the interior of Bahia. With a panoramic view of the beautiful Bahian coastline, the flight lasts just 25 minutes and is operated twice a week on Mondays and Thursdays in codeshare with GOL Linhas Aéreas.

On February 19, 2024, Abaeté Aviação celebrated its 45 years of history, highlighting the transformations that have been taking place in recent years, moving from an air taxi company to an important subregional airline that is expanding its horizons and operations in Bahia.

== Aviation services ==
In addition to commercial and private flights, Abaeté Aviação also offers fixed-base operator (FBO) aeronautical services such as fueling, hangaring, handling, tie-down and parking, aircraft rental, fractional ownership, aircraft maintenance and similar services in its hangar located at Salvador International Airport, providing support services to general aviation operators at a public-use airport. The hangar has two VIP rooms that have a meeting room and other amenities available 24 hours a day.

== Destinations ==
As of April 2024, Abaeté Aviação operated scheduled services to the following destinations in Brazil:

Base
Future
Terminated

Abaeté Aviação destinations
State	City	Airport	Notes
Bahia
Bahia	Boipeba (Cairu)	Fábio Perini Airport	Ended on May 31, 2026
Bahia	Maraú (Barra Grande)	Barra Grande Airport	Started on December 17, 2021
Bahia	Morro de São Paulo (Cairu)	Lorenzo Airport	Started on December 18, 2020
Bahia	Mucugê	Mucugê Airport	Suspended in 2023
Bahia	Salvador da Bahia	Dep. Luís Eduardo Magalhães International Airport	HUB

=== Codeshare agreements ===
As of April 2024, Abaeté Aviação has codeshare agreements with the following airlines:

- GOL Linhas Aéreas

== Fleet ==
=== Current fleet ===
As of November 2024, the fleet of Abaeté Aviação includes the following aircraft:

Abaeté Aviação fleet
Aircraft	In service	Orders	Passengers	Note
Beechcraft King Air C90	1	—	6	Only for VIP flights
Cessna 208 Caravan	5	—	9	Scheduled and non-scheduled flights
Hawker Beechcraft 400	2	—	8	Only for VIP flights
Embraer EMB 110 Bandeirante	1	—	14	Only for non-scheduled flights
Embraer EMB 821 Carajá	3	—	8	Only for VIP flights
TOTAL	12	—		

=== Former fleet ===
Abaeté Aviação formerly operated the following aircraft:

Retired Abaeté Aviação fleet
Aircraft	Total	Introduced	Retired	Notes
Cessna 208B Super Cargomaster	1	1994	2011	Sold to TwoFlex Aviação
Cessna 402B	2	1985	2018	Transferred from Atlanta Táxi Aéreo
Cessna Citation II	1	2007	2023	
Embraer EMB 121 Xingu	3	2002	2024	Reg. PT-MBU crashed on October 23, 2024

== Airline affinity program ==
Abaeté Linhas Aéreas has no Frequent Flyer Program.

== Accidents and incidents ==
- On October 23, 2024, the Embraer EMB 121 Xingu, registration PT-MBU, which was on a repositioning flight between Florianópolis and the airline's base in Salvador da Bahia, with a technical stop in Belo Horizonte, with 5 people on board, crashed in a forested area near the city of Santa Branca, in São Paulo. There were no survivors. The five people on board were a pilot, the co-pilot, a mechanic, a doctor and a nurse, all employees of Abaeté Aviação. The aircraft had previously carried out an aeromedical evacuation flight.

== See also ==
- Abaeté Linhas Aéreas
- List of airlines of Brazil
