= Abaeté Linhas Aéreas =

Airline of Brazil (1994–2012)

Abaeté Linhas Aéreas S/A
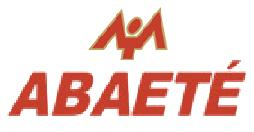
IATA	ICAO	Call sign
BJ	ABJ	ABAETÉ
- Founded: 1994
- Ceased operations: February 2012
- Hubs: Salvador International Airport
- Fleet size: 2 (at the time of suspension)
- Destinations: 3 (at the time of suspension)
- Parent company: Aerotáxi Abaeté
- Headquarters: Lauro de Freitas, Brazil
- Key people: Jorge Ney Barreto Mello (President)
- Website: www.abaete.com.br

Abaeté Linhas Aéreas was a domestic regional airline headquartered in Lauro de Freitas, near Salvador da Bahia, Brazil. Founded in 1994, it ceased operations in 2012 and in 2018 had its license revoked by the National Civil Aviation Agency of Brazil (ANAC). The airline was a subsidiary of Aerotáxi Abaeté (now Abaeté Aviação), which in 2020 resumed regular commercial flights.

== History ==
Abaeté Linhas Aéreas can trace its origins to Aerotáxi Abaeté, an air taxi airline established in 1979. In 1994, Aerotáxi Abaeté received authorization to establish a sister company called Abaeté Linhas Aéreas, dedicated to the operation of scheduled services. Both companies continue to offer services as charter and scheduled airlines and sometimes interchange aircraft.

Abaeté Linhas Aéreas began its operations flying with two 14-seat Embraer EMB 110 Bandeirante between Dois de Julho International Airport (now renamed as Deputado Luís Eduardo Magalhães International Airport or simply Salvador Bahia Airport) and the cities of Bom Jesus da Lapa, Caravelas, Teixeira de Freitas and Guanambi. In 2002, due to low demand, it stopped flying to Caravelas.

In 2006, Abaeté added a third Embraer Bandeirante to the commercial fleet and began flying between Salvador and Barreiras, extending the route to the federal capital Brasília. However, two years later, due to the Great Recession, which resulted in increased costs and uncertainty about the future, the airline decided to optimize its operations, withdrawing one of the three planes and maintaining flights only to Bom Jesus da Lapa and Guanambi.

In February 2012, after reporting monthly losses of R$100,000.00 (US$57,000.00), Abaeté Linhas Aéreas announced the suspension of its regular commercial operations. The operations of its parent company, Aerotáxi Abaeté, however, were not affected

== Destinations ==
When suspended its operations in February 2012, Abaeté Linhas Aéreas operated scheduled services to the following destinations:

- Bom Jesus da Lapa – Bom Jesus da Lapa Airport
- Guanambi – Guanambi Airport
- Salvador da Bahia – Deputado Luís Eduardo Magalhães International Airport

== Fleet ==
When Abaeté Linhas Aéreas suspended its operations in February 2012, its fleet was made up of the following aircraft:

Abaeté Linhas Aéreas Fleet
Aircraft	Total	Orders	Passengers	Notes
Embraer EMB 110 Bandeirante	2	—	14	Transferred to Aerotáxi Abaeté

== Airline affinity program ==
Abaeté Linhas Aéreas had no Frequent Flyer Program.

== See also ==
- Abaeté Aviação
- List of airlines of Brazil
- List of defunct airlines of Brazil
