= Valença Airport =

Valença Airport Aeroporto de Valença
- IATA: VAL; ICAO: SNVB; LID: BA0008

Summary
- Airport type: Public
- Serves: Valença
- Time zone: BRT (UTC−03:00)
- Elevation AMSL: 5 m (16 ft)
- Coordinates: 13°17′47″S 038°59′33″W

Map
- Location in Brazil

Runways
Direction	Length		Surface
Direction	m	ft	Surface
04/22	1,800	5,906	Asphalt
- Sources: ANAC, DECEA

Valença Airport (IATA: VAL, ICAO: SNVB) is the airport serving Valença, Brazil and the holiday area around Morro de São Paulo, in the municipality of Cairu.

== History ==
The airport was opened in 1948 and renovated in 2000.

== Access ==
The airport is located 10 km (6 mi) from downtown Valença.

== See also ==
- List of airports in Brazil
