= MXQ =

MXQ may refer to:

- MXQ, the IATA code for Morro de São Paulo Airport, Cairu, Brazil
- mxq, the ISO 639-3 code for Juquila language, Mexico
