= Valença, Bahia =

Coordinates: 13.370°S 39.069°W

Valença
- Municipality
- Municipality of Valença
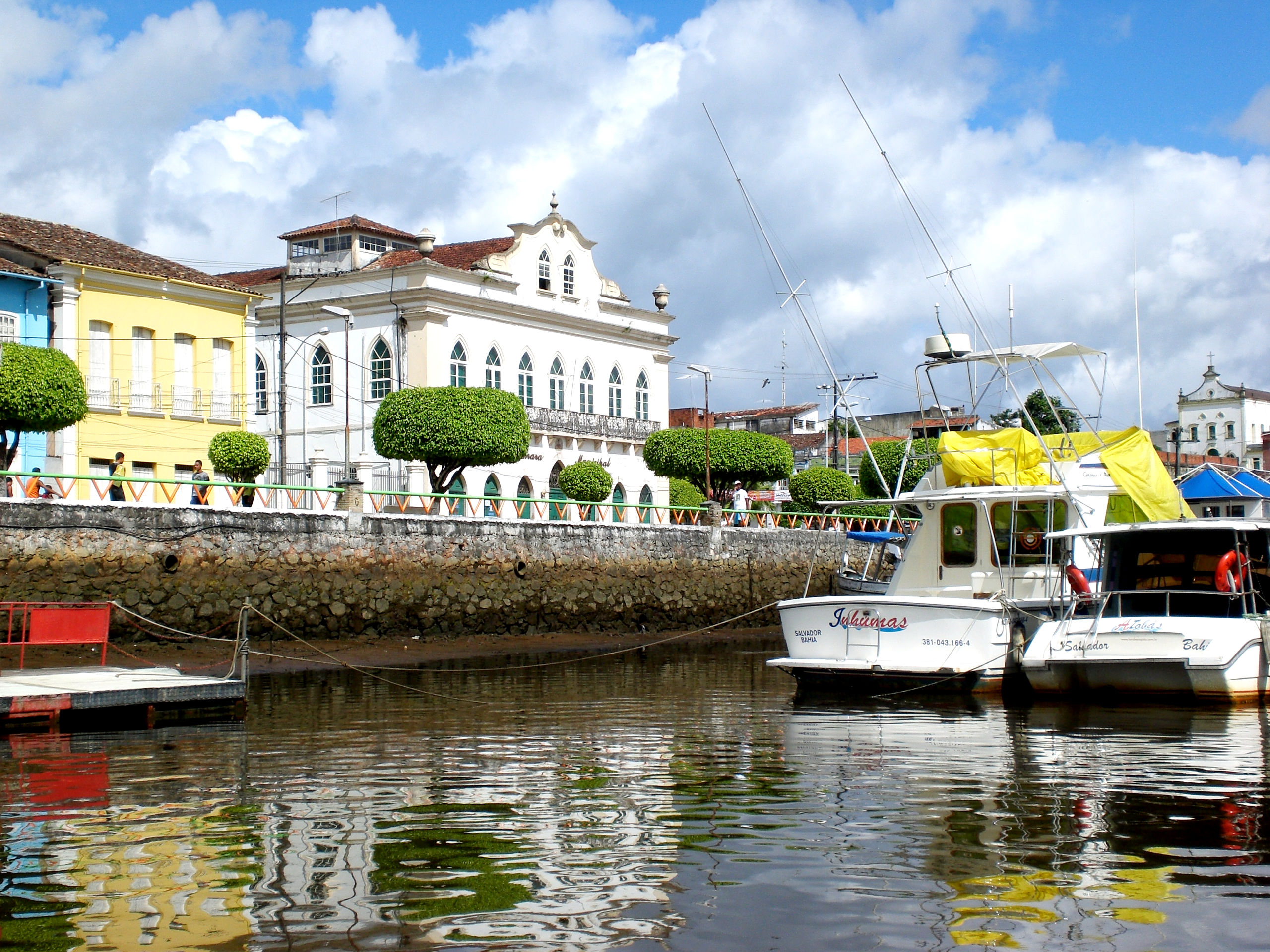
- Municipal hall

- Flag Coat of arms
- Nicknames: A decidida ("The decided one"); A hospitaleira ("The receptive")
- Location in Bahia
- Country: Brazil
- Region: Northeast
- State: Bahia
- Established: 10 November 1849

Population (2021)
  - Total: 97,873
- Time zone: UTC−3 (BRT)

Valença is a Brazilian city in the state of Bahia and has an estimated population of 97,233. It is visited by tourists because it is the main access to the island of Ilha de Tinharé, famous for the town of Morro de São Paulo.

The municipality contains part of the 230,296-hectare (569,070-acre) Caminhos Ecológicos da Boa Esperança Environmental Protection Area, created in 2003.

== The town ==
Valença is the largest city in the Dendê Coast (costa do dendê), but it is also a placid 16th century colonial fishing town and a dynamic commercial and service center of the region. Famous for its shrimp, Valença has a quay in the port lined by colonial-period buildings such as the Town Hall, sobrados, and warehouses. Valença offers rich historical patrimony that lives in harmony with the picturesque boats on the Una River that divides the city. Three bridges link both sides of the city.

Valença was the first industrial center in Brazil, with cotton textile mills and other industries. It is also known for its natural resources, including the 15 kilometres (9.3 mi) of beaches in Guaibim, the Candengo waterfalls, the Ponta do Curral and the Una River with its mangroves.

The city is served by Valença Airport.

== Crime ==
In recent history, Valença has become notorious for its high crime rate and drug trafficking. Tourists passing through Valença to get to Morro de São Paulo are advised to be cautious and aware of their surroundings.

== History ==
The territory in which the municipality of Valença is located, at the time of the discovery of Brazil, was inhabited by peaceful Tupiniquim Indians. When Don João III, King of Portugal divided Brazil in 1534 into huge estates (called, capitanias hereditárias), the area of Valença belonged to the Ilhéus estate under the jurisdiction of Vila de Nossa Senhora do Rosário de Cairu, location where the first populace was established.

People settled on the margins of the river Una in their farms of sugar cane and fodder. Apart from these"civilized" settlers, there was also a small village of sugar mills that belonged to a man called Sebastião de Pontes. This violent tempered yet honest man, who was accustomed to wars and fighting and disdained anyone who would contradict or offend him, had taken sides against the indigenous people. At around 1573, a peddler arrived in the sugar mill dared to offend of Sebastião de Pontes, who immediately ordered the intruder be whipped and marked with a hot iron.

It has been told that this peddler, once in Portugal, managed to present himself before the King when he was walking to Mass. The peddler dropped his cloak and revealed the mark on his back, crying for justice. Orders were immediately sent to the capital of Brazil for Sebastião de Pontes to be imprisoned and sent back to Lisbon. The royal government went to Morro de São Paulo in a war ship. The commander of the ship tricked Sebastião de Pontes into boarding the ship and, during lunch, imprisoned him and sent him back to Portugal. He died in a prison in Limoeiro and, with his disappearance, Una lost the only man that had brought so much prosperity. From then on, invaded by the violent Aymores Indians, progress shrunk and colonization of Valença stopped for many years. After the bloody retaliations of the bandeirantes of João Amaro Maciel Parente, the location was finally able to progress, justifying the proposal for the creation of a village in the populace of Una. On 23 January 1799, the Vila de Nova Valença do Santíssimo Coração de Jesus was created, with territory taken from the municipality of Cairu.

At this time, the extraction of wood began used for the building of royal army ships and the deforested area was then occupied by farm activities, mostly cassava (mandioca), rice, coffee, black pepper and cinnamon.

The inhabitants of the neighboring islands that lived in constant confrontation with the Indians and were therefore unable to plant, slowly returned to the area, which was already establishing a population nucleus in the areas surrounding the Nossa Senhora do Amparo chapel. The name Valença was attributed by these newcomers for which the location represented a solution to their problems, Land of Valença, of salvation. Another version says that the name came from counselor Baltasar da Silva Lisboa who wished to pay homage to minister Marques de Valença, subsequently granting the populace the state of village on 10 June 1789, naming it Nova Valença.

At around this time, construction of the church Santíssimo Coração de Jesus began.

In 1849, the municipal area received the title of city, named Industrial Cidade Valença.

Other interesting historical facts The region suffered under the Dutch invasion in Bahia in 1624 and actively participated in the battles for the independence of Bahia.

It harbored the fleet of Lord Cochrane, who came to fight the Portuguese in 1823. The role of the city in this battle was so impressive that it received the title of "the decided one" as stated in the city's anthem.

== WWII ==
During the Second World War, Valença also participated when the German submarines bombarded the ships Itajiba e Irará at its coast. The passengers were saved by the Araripe barge and the wounded were taken to the improvised hospital in the building of the Textile Workers Syndicate, a building with French design and neoclassical architecture. This same building was also the first blood bank of the region. For its active participation, Valença received the title of "city of hospitality".

Valença currently has the main shipyards of Bahia, where ships, barges, sailboats, schooners and even caravels are built, like the copy of the Niña, from the fleet of Christopher Columbus for the film: 1492: Conquest of Paradise, by Ridley Scott.

== Historic structures ==
Valença is home to numerous colonial-period historic structures, some designated as Bahian state monuments. The Historic Center of Valença (Centro Histórico de Valença) lacks state or federal protection, but is home to numerous historic homes, government buildings, and churches.

- House of the City Council of Valença (Casa da Câmara dos Vereadores)
- House of Dr. Heitor Guedes Mello (Casa do Dr. Heitor Guedes Mello (Estância Azul))
- Birthplace of Zacarias Góes de Vasconcelos (Casa onde nasceu o Conselheiro Zacarias Góes de Vasconcelos)
- Parish Church of the Sacred Heart of Jesus (Igreja Matriz Sagrado Coração de Jesus)
- Church of Our Lady of Protection of Valença (Igreja de Nossa Senhora do Amparo de Valença)

== Notable people ==
- Zacarias de Góis e Vasconcelos, prime minister of Brazil during the imperial era

== See also ==
- List of municipalities in Bahia
