= Ilha de Boipeba =

Island in Cairu, Brazil

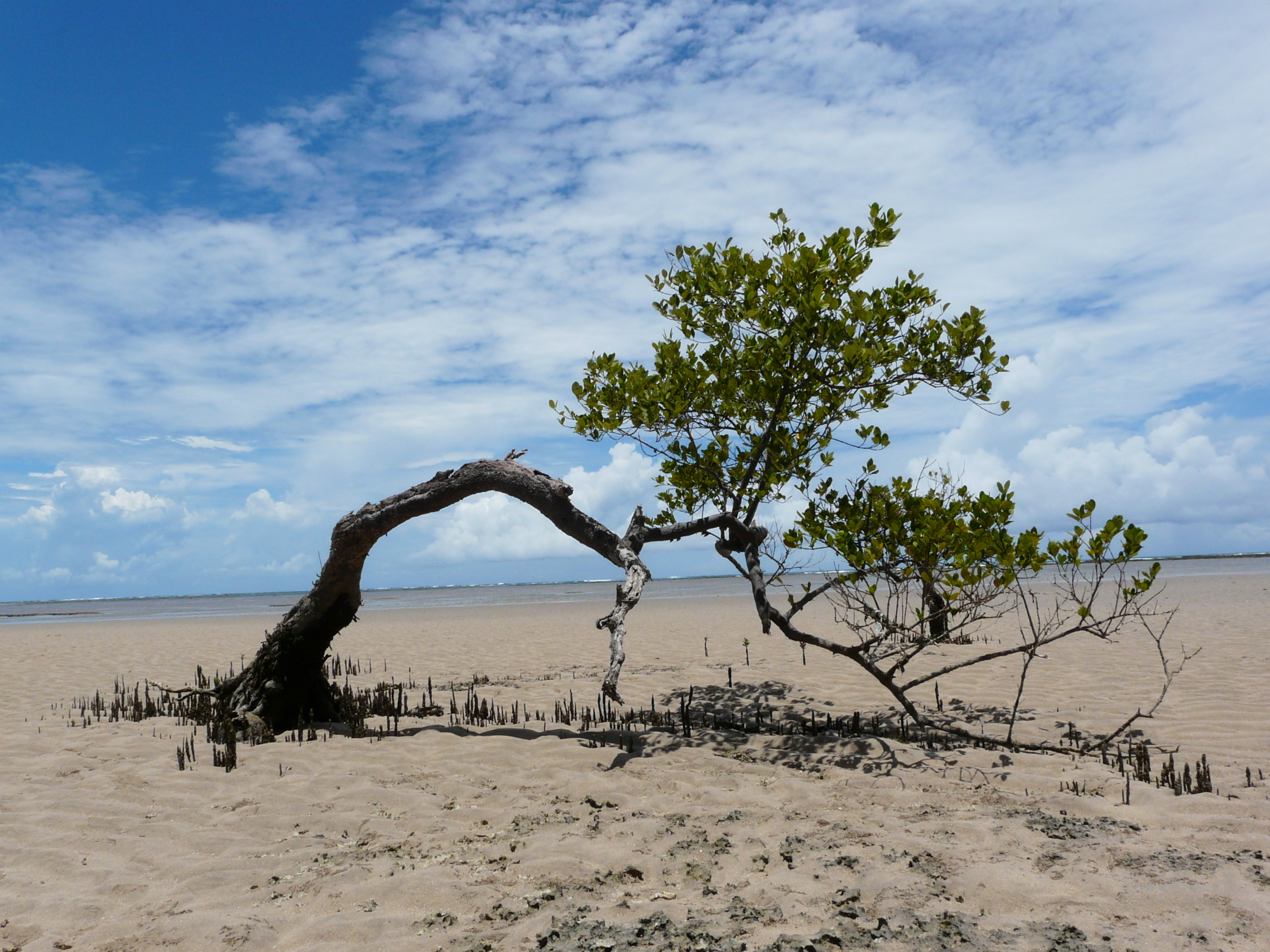
- A mangrove tree on the coast of Boipeba
- Interactive map of Ilha de Boipeba

Geography
- Coordinates: 13°37′24″S 38°54′23″W
- Archipelago: Cairu Archipelago
- Area: 88 km^{2} (34 sq mi)
- Highest elevation: 6 m (20 ft)

Administration
- Brazil
- Region: Northeast Region
- State: Bahia
- Municipality: Cairu

Demographics
- Population: 3,256 (2010)
- Pop. density: 37/km^{2} (96/sq mi)
- Ethnic groups: Tupi

Ilha de Boipeba (transl. Boipeba Island) is an island in the Cairu municipality in Brazil, near the Ilha de Tinharé and part of the Cairu Archipelago. It is surrounded on the east by the Atlantic Ocean and on the west by the Rio de l'Enfer estuary.

It is a popular tourist destination due to its scenic beaches and rainforest, which makes up the majority of the island's economy along with fishing.

The island covers 88 square kilometers and had a population of 3,256 in 2010. There are four villages: Velha Boipeba, São Sebastião, Moreré, and Monte Alegre. Its beaches are Praia da Boca da Barra, Praia de Tassimirim, Praia da Cueira, Praia de Moreré, Praia de Bainema, Praia da Cova da Onça, and Praia da Ponta dos Castelhanos.

Ilha de Boipeba was first settled in 1537 by Jesuits from Portugal, making it one of the oldest settled places in the state of Bahia. The Church of Divino Espírito Santo, built in 1610, is its most important monument.

Cars are generally banned on the island, with the exception of ambulances. Instead, people travel on foot, and goods are transported using vehicles such as tractors, mule-carts, and wheel-barrows.

The name Boipeba comes from the word "M'boi pewa" (literally "flat snake") in the Tupi language, the native name for the sea turtle.

== Transportation ==
Velha Boipeba is accessible by direct flights from Salvador da Bahia to Fábio Perini Airport.

== See also ==
- List of islands of Brazil
