= Lucio (footballer, born 1982) =

Brazilian footballer

Lúcio
Personal information
- Full name: Edilúcio de Souza Rocha
- Date of birth: 1 January 1982 (age 44)
- Place of birth: Guanambi-BA, Brazil
- Height: 1.81 m (5 ft 11 in)
- Position: Central defender

Team information
- Current team: Democrata GV-MG

Senior career*
Years	Team	Apps	(Gls)
2004	Monte Claros-MG		
2005	Poções-MG		
2006	Tombense-MG (Loan)		
2006	Democrata GV-MG		
- ?
2007	Atlético Mineiro		
2007	Passense (loan)		
2008	Democrata GV-MG (loan)		
2008	Uberlândia (loan)		
2009	Guarani Futebol Clube		
2009	Guanambi		
2009–2010	Tombense Futebol Clube		
2010	Democrata GV-MG		
2010	ASA	3	(0)
- * Club domestic league appearances and goals

Edilúcio de Souza Rocha or simply Lúcio (born 1 January 1982 in Guanambi-BA), is a Brazilian central defender who played for Democrata GV-MG.

Clube Atlético Mineiro signed Lúcio after he had a strong performance with Democrata in 2007, but he never appeared for the club's first team. Lúcio spent most of his playing career with Democrata, including spells during 2007, 2008, 2009, 2011 and 2013.

He would play in the Campeonato Brasileiro Série B with Agremiação Sportiva Arapiraquense during 2010. Lúcio made his only start for ASA in a match against Bragantino in May 2010.
