= Fonte Grande of Morro de São Paulo =

- Fonte Grande de Morro de São Paulo
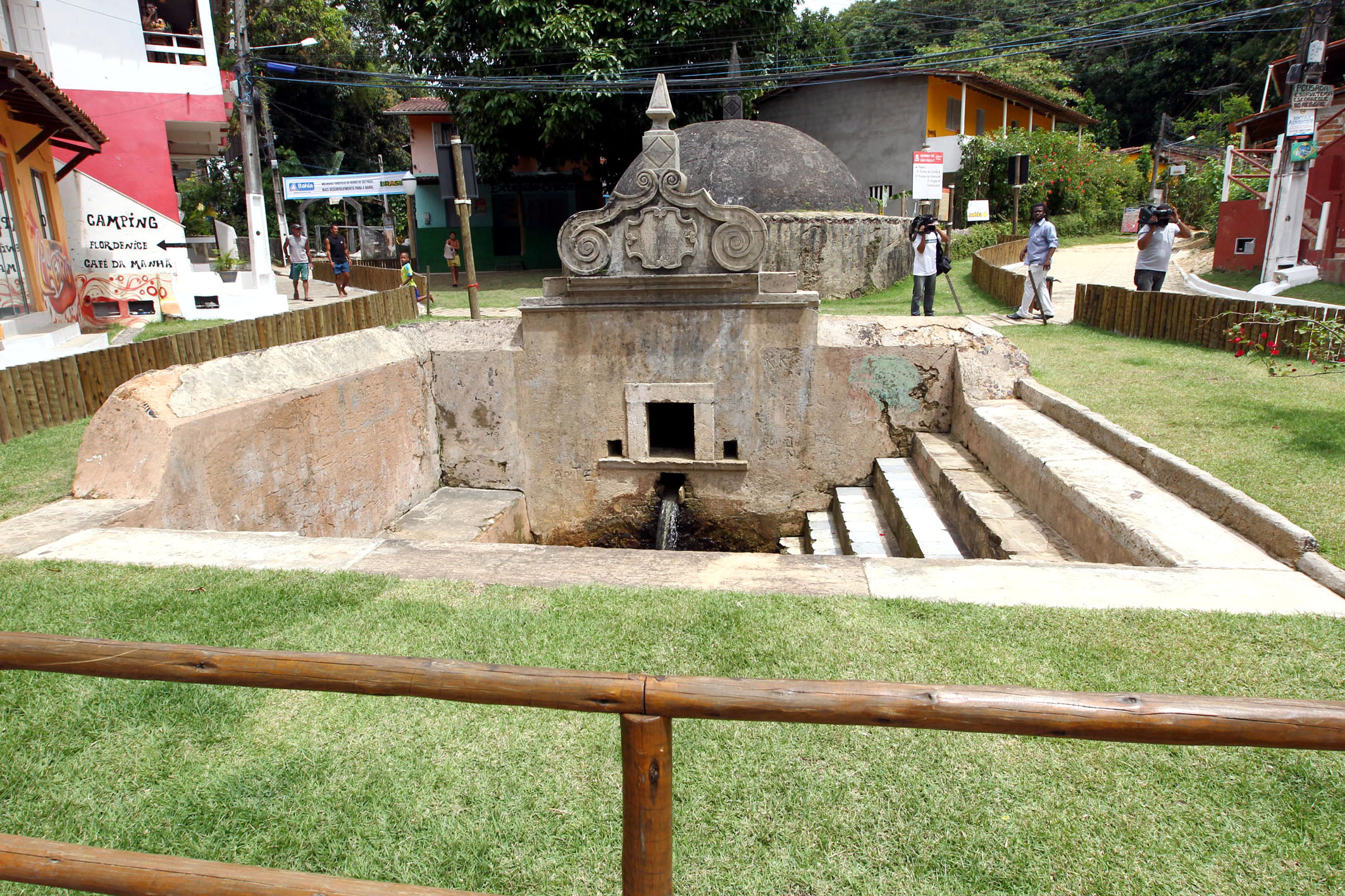
- Fonte Grande of Morro de São Paulo, Tinharé Island, Cairu, Bahia

- Location within Brazil

General information
- Architectural style: Baroque
- Location: Rua da Fonte Grande, Cairu, Bahia, Brazil
- Coordinates: 13.379522°S 38.91762°W

Height
- Architectural: Baroque

National Historic Heritage of Brazil
- Designated: 1943
- Reference no.: 321

The Fonte Grande of Morro de São Paulo (Portuguese: Fonte Grande de Morro de São Paulo) is a Baroque-style fountain on Tinharé Island, Cairu, Bahia, Brazil. It dates to 1746 and was constructed by André de Melo e Castro, viceroy of Brazil, to supply water to a prison, soldiers, and residents. The fountain is located to the southeast of the settlement of Morro de São Paulo, and was the most advanced water supply system in colonial Brazil. It was listed as a historic structure by the National Institute of Historic and Artistic Heritage in 1943.

== History ==
André de Melo e Castro (1668-1753), viceroy of Brazil, built the three-spouted fountain to serve a local prison, soldiers on the Island of Tinharé, and resident. The fountain may have been built on the site of a smaller, earlier fountain discovered by Simao Barreto in the 17th century as part of the construction of Church of Our Lady of Luz (Igreja de Nossa Senhora da Luz). Dom Pedro II, during a tour of Morro de Sao Paulo in 1859, recorded the existence of "a public fountain with three spouts."

Illegal excavations were made at the fountain in 1933 and 1946 in search of buried treasures; both excavations caused damage to the structure. The quality of water in the fountain has deteriorated due to the strain of large-scale tourism on the water and sanitation system of Morro de Sao Paulo.

== Location ==
The fountain is located at the southeast of the small settlement of Morro de São Paulo. The fountain is located below the street level and is accessible by stairs.

== Structure ==
The Fonte Grande of Morro de São Paulo has a rectangular plan with a vault. It consists of a feed stream; a vaulted adduction gallery; a circular cistern covered by a brick, tiled dome in the shape of a half-orange; a wastewater catchment; an iron chute; stairs, and a drainage system. The fountain is accessed by a staircase with gray and white marble flooring. Its frontispiece is of Bahian sandstone. It is crowned by a baroque pediment with volutes and a diamond-shaped pinnacle. A cartouche is at center with an inscription reading:

"The Most Illustrious and Honorable André de Melo de Castro, Count of Galveas Virei and Captain General of the Sea and Land of the State of Brazil had this font made 1746."^{A}

IPHAN performed basic conservation works on the fountain in 1946 and 1954. It was fully restored in approximately 1970 under the direction of the architect Anísio Luz.

== Protected status ==
The Fonte Grande of Morro de São Paulo was listed as a historic structure by the National Institute of Historic and Artistic Heritage in 1943.

== Footnote ==
A.Portuguese: O Ilmº e Exmº André de Melo de Castro Conde das Galveas Virei e Capᵃᵐ Genᵃˡ De Mar e Terra Estado do Brazil mandou fazer esta Fonte 1746.
