= Convent and Church of Saint Antony =

Former church and convent in Bahia, Brazil

- Convento e Igreja de Santo António
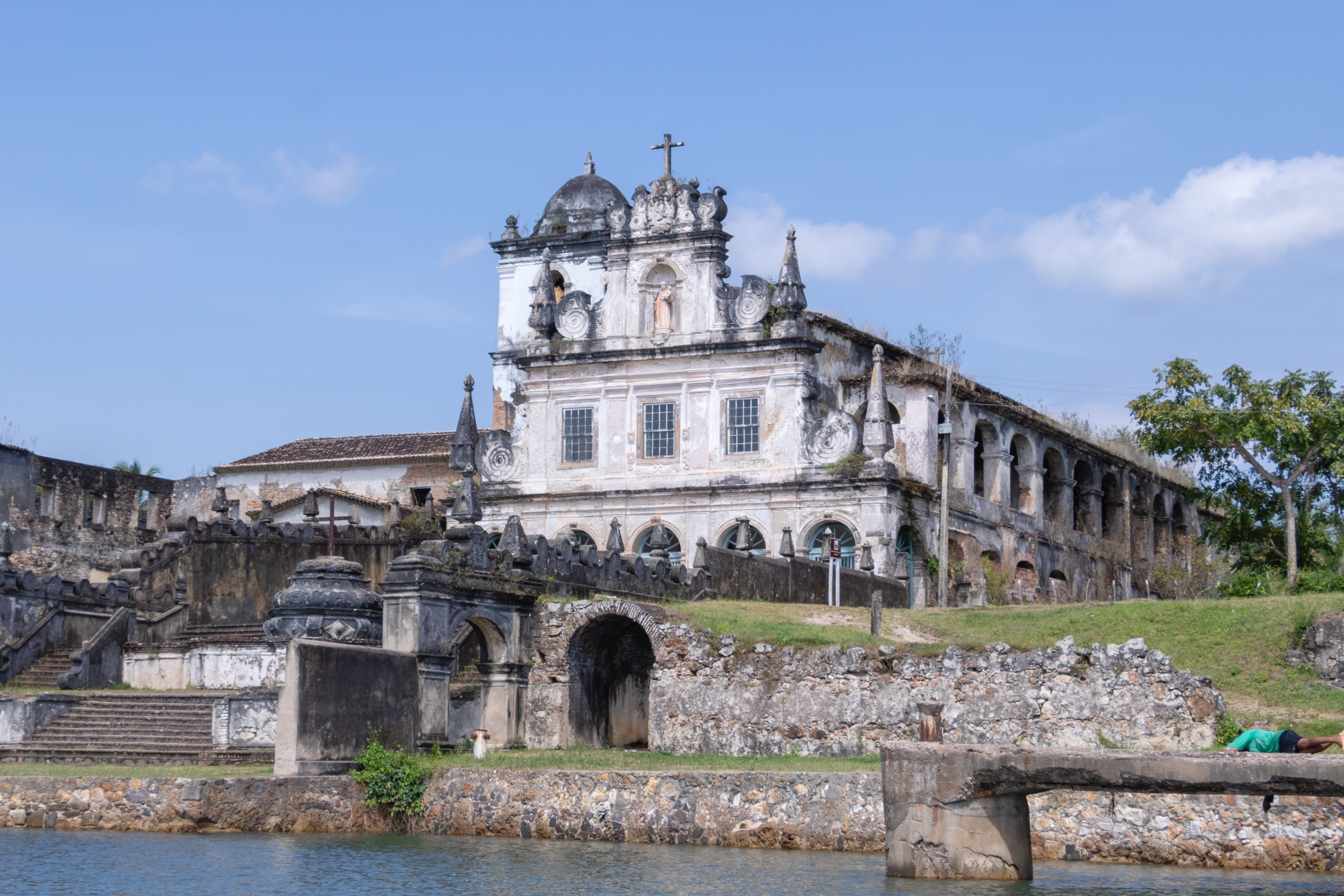
- Façade of the Convent and Church of Saint Antony

- Location of the Convent and Church of Saint Antony in Brazil

Religion
- Affiliation: Catholic
- Rite: Roman
- Patron: Saint Anthony

Location
- Municipality: Cachoeira
- State: Bahia
- Country: Brazil
- Interactive map of Convent and Church of Saint Antony
- Coordinates: 12.606350°S 38.961586°W

Architecture
- Type: Religious
- Style: Baroque

National Historic Heritage of Brazil
- Designated: 1938
- Reference no.: 181

The Convent and Church of Saint Antony (Portuguese: Convento e Igreja de Santo António) is a former Franciscan church and convent in Cachoeira, Bahia, Brazil. Construction on the church was likely completed in 1658. The church is dedicated to Saint Anthony of Padua and constructed in the Baroque style with a Rococo frontispiece. The convent and church fell into ruin by the end of the 19th century; Archbishop Jerônimo Thomé da Silva allowed a commission to demolish and sell the contents in 1915; it lacked the funds to demolish the church, but sold its contents to José Mariano Filho in 1916. The monumental façade of the church served as a model for Baroque churches across the Northeast Region of Brazil; it and its intricate garden remain on the site. The church and convent were listed as a historic structure by National Institute of Historic and Artistic Heritage (IPHAN) in 1941.

== History ==
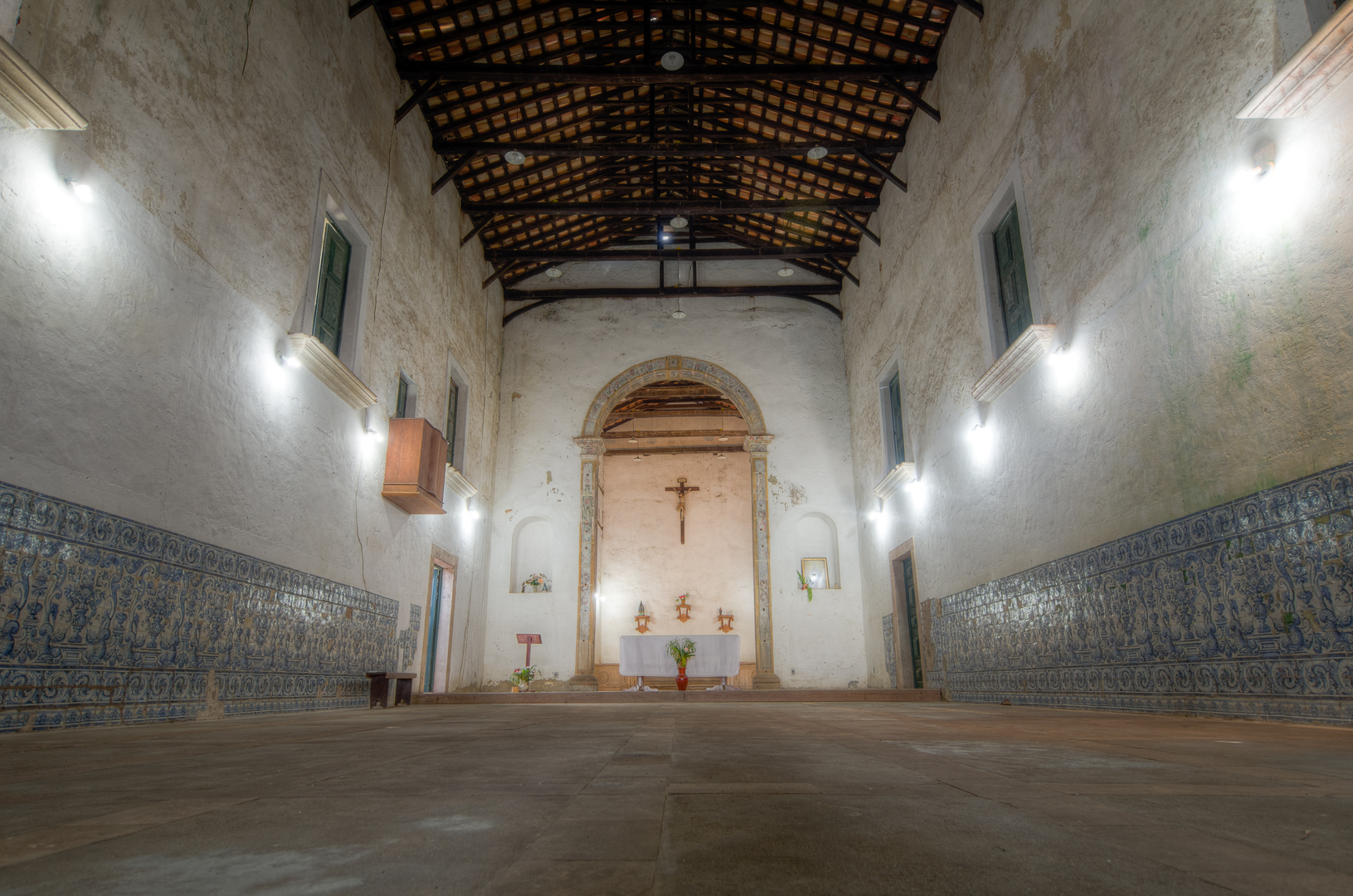
View of nave and chancel

Pope Alexander VII (1599-1667) separated the Franciscan Province of Santo Antônio in Brazil from the Province of Santo Antônio in Portal in the mid-17th century. Frei Antonio de Santa Maria Jaboatão conceived the idea of a convent removed from the city of Salvador. Father João Batista accepted the donation of two small pieces of land from Father Pedro Garcia, owner of the Engenho Velho sugarcane plantation. Batista considered moving the order to Maragogipe, but began construction of a large-scale convent and church on the Iguape site. A novitiate was established on the site in 1654, the second in Brazil, and materials for a new structure were accumulated from the surrounding area.

Construction began in 1658 and the church was consecrated in 1660; it was likely not fully completed at this point. Completion of the church likely dates to 1686, as evidenced by a marker located at the entrance of the convent with the date. Construction of the church and convent are similar to that of the Convent and Church of Saint Anthony, which was consecrated in 1650. A hospital was established at the church and convent in 1686; it was transferred to Cachoeira in 1729 and is known as the Hospital São João de Deus. There were twenty friars at the convent in 1759. The novitiate ceased in 1824, and the convent had only five residents by 1857. By 1888 the convent and church were "only serving as a lair to the nocturnal birds".

The Franciscans abandoned the convent in the early 20th century. They donated the convent and church was donated to the Archdiocese of Salvador on January 19, 1915. Archbishop Jerônimo Thomé da Silva formed a commission to survey the condition of the convent and church; the commission demolished the convent and sold both the building materials and interior elements of the building. The commission lacked the funds to demolish the church and sold the property to José Mariano Filho in 1916. Mariano Filho removed or sold the church images, azulejos, floors, linings of the nave, furniture in jacaranda, and lavabo in lioz; elements of the church that were removed to Solar Monjope, his residence in Rio de Janeiro were lost with its demolition in the 1970s. The balustrades in carved jacaranda of the church and convent were transferred to the entrance of the Federal Ministry of Education building in Salvador.

== Location ==
The Convent and Church of Saint Antony is located on the Iguape estuary of the Paraguaçu River far from the city center of Cachoeira. Access to the church and convent was by river for much of its history; roads to the community of Iguape were only constructed later. The church and convent is set back from the Iguape on a slight embankment, but a single wing of the convent extends out to the river.

== Structure ==
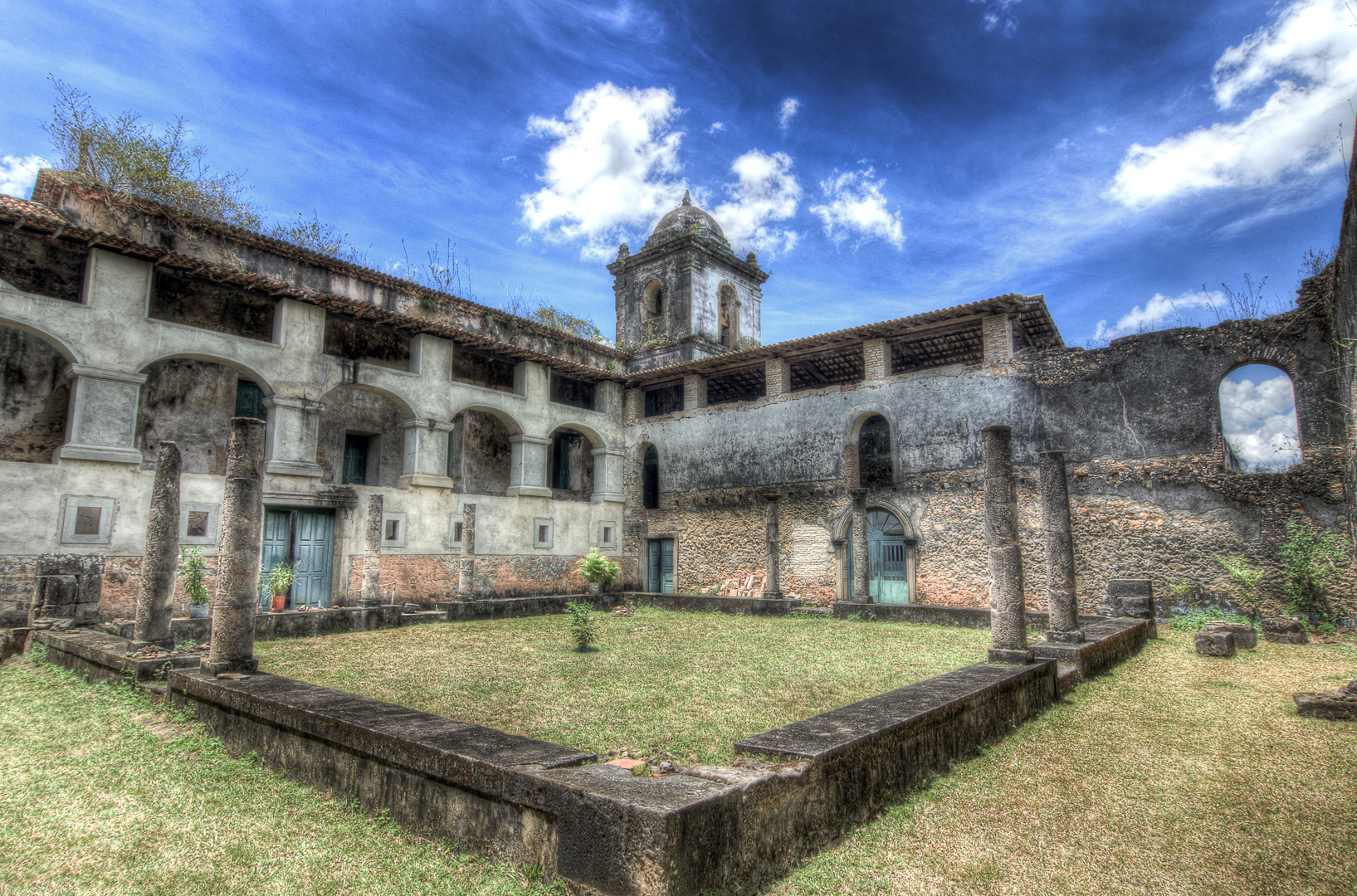
Ruins of the convent

The Convent and Church of Saint Antony is a large-scale complex consisting of a two-story church, convent, and garden that leads to the mooring. Its walls are of mixed masonry. The church and convent has a stone quay on the Iguape; the quay it is still active.

=== Church yard ===
A multi-level garden extends from the quay up to the entrance of the church. The walls on either side of the garden are decorated with large volutes and other Baroque decorative elements. A large cross sits in the church garden on the second level from the quay. It has a monumental pedestal in the shape of a polyhedron. The pedestal is of sandstone and richly decorated in stylized floral, shell, seashell, tropical fruit, and mask motifs. The courtyard of the convent sat on the other side of the wall that extends to the water.

A veranda once extended from the top of the wing that extends to the river; it was called "the best and only source of pleasure for the friars in this house".

=== Convent ===
The convent consisted of two courtyards, one lower and one higher towards the convent. The conical hooded chimney of the kitchen remains. A well was located at the far end of the convent; an aqueduct delivered water to the kitchen.

=== Frontispiece ===
The frontispiece of the Church of Saint Antony represented a new design; it spread widely to Franciscan churches in the Northeast of Brazil. Its design, closely following the independence of the Franciscans in Brazil from those in Portugal, was like a "resounding like a cry for freedom."

=== Tower ===
The church tower sits back from the church and convent. It has an octagonal dome.

=== Church ===
The frontispiece is in the Baroque style and faces the river. It has a wide covered gallery with five semi-circular arches, three of them occupied by wooden doors. Five choir windows are above the portals. In contrast, the façades of the convent and the Church of the Third Order are, in comparison, sober. The pinnacle of the façade is in three parts with five semi-circular arches. The flaming rococo pediments, according to the art historian Germain Bazin, display elements of Chinese architecture, probably via the influence of architecture in the Portuguese colony of Macau. A bell tower rises above the right side of the church; it is recessed from the façade. The design of the church is similar to that of the convents of Carmo, Graça and Desterro, in Salvador, all constructed in the same period.

The church plan is typical to others of the period; it has a rectangular plan with a single nave with two side aisles superposed by tribunes and a cross sacristy. Its side corridors are superposed by tribunes and a deep chapel. The church interior was richly decorated, but very little remains of its original decoration.

== Protected status ==
The lavabo of the church was listed by the National Institute of Historic and Artistic Heritage in 1938; the site of the ruins of the convent and church were listed as a historic structure at a later date.

== Access ==
The ruins of the church and convent are open to the public and may be visited.

== See also ==
- Catholic Church in Brazil
