= Convent and Church of Saint Anthony (Cairu) =

Roman Catholic church in Bahia, Brazil

Church and Convent of Saint Antony
- Igreja e Convento de Santo António
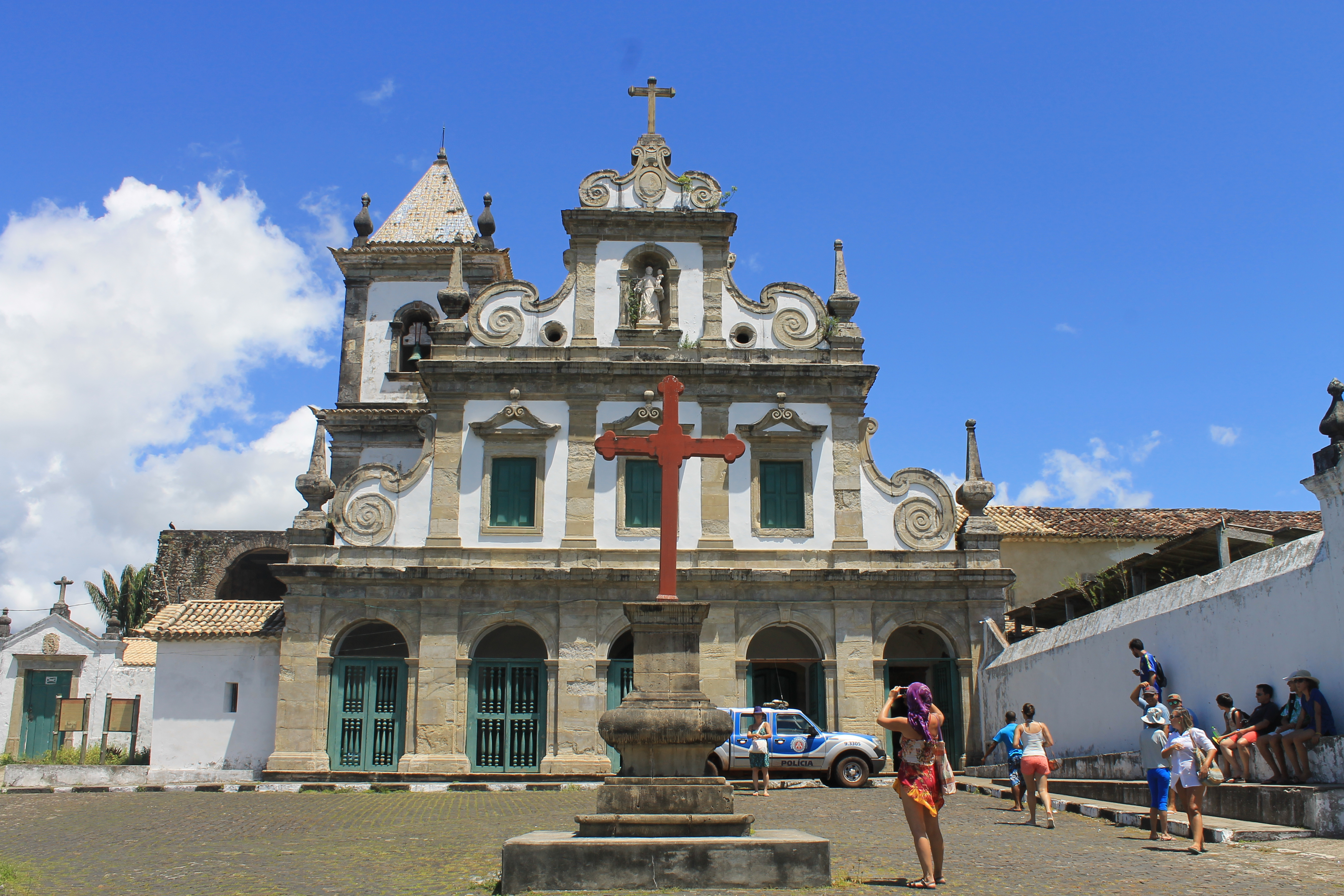
- Façade of the Church and Convent of Saint Antony

- Location of the Church and Convent of Saint Antony in Brazil

Religion
- Affiliation: Catholic
- Rite: Roman
- Patron: Saint Anthony

Location
- Municipality: Cairu
- State: Bahia
- Country: Brazil
- Interactive map of Church and Convent of Saint Antony
- Coordinates: 13.48681°S 39.04511°W

Architecture
- Type: Baroque
- Established: 1650
- Interior area: 3,215 square metres (34,610 ft^{2})

National Historic Heritage of Brazil
- Designated: 1941
- Reference no.: 258

The Church and Convent of Saint Antony (Portuguese: Igreja e Convento de Santo António) is a 17th-century Roman Catholic church located in Cairu, Bahia, Brazil. It was consecrated in 1650, but construction on the complex probably began at the beginning of the century. It is dedicated to Saint Anthony. The church building is noted for its elaborate façade and numerous Franciscan architectural elements. It covers 3,215 square metres (34,610 ft^{2}). The church was listed as a historic structure by the National Historic and Artistic Heritage Institute in 1941. The architect Mário Mendonça de Oliveira calls the convent and church "one of the most outstanding existing examples of Brazilian religious architecture and Franciscan architecture."

== History ==
The Convent and Church of Saint Antony of Cairu was built on the site of a small chapel, also named after Saint Antony. It was built by Daniel de São Francisco, a Franciscan friar born in Penafiel, Portugal. He arrived in Brazil, initially in Pernambuco, early in the 17th century. He became a friar in the Franciscan convent at Olinda, and moved to Salvador in 1630 during the Dutch occupation of Brazil. Daniel de São Francisco taught theology in Salvador for many years, and was then chosen to negotiate the separation of the Brazilian Franciscan convents from those in Portugal. He negotiated first with the Portuguese crown, then with the Pope in 1647; the first Brazilian Franciscan province was established in 1657.

A cornerstone of the church dates to 1654, and construction was financed by both the Franciscans and donors in Bahia. Its design likely influenced the Convent and Church of Saint Antony in Iguape, Cachoeira, which was completed by 1680.

== Structure ==
The Convent and Church of Saint Antony is divided into a church of Santo Antônio, a church yard with a monumental cross, and convent to the north. The chapel of the Third Order sits in ruins to the south.

Alberto Sousa asserts that the church is the first in Brazil to exhibit Baroque features, and predates the introduction of the style in Portugal. No other Baroque church in Europe exhibit the characteristics of the Church of Saint Anthony. Its value is attested by the emergence of numerous Brazilian churches constructed in rapid succession in the design of the Church of Saint Anthony, notably churches and convents of the same name in Paraguaçu and Recife.

== Ruins of the Chapel of the Third Order ==
The construction of the Chapel of the Third Order of Saint Antony began in the 18th century, but was never finished. It was constructed in a location recessed from the façade as a sign of obedience to the First Order. The partially-constructed building fell into decay in the 19th century; its ruins are located to the north of the site.

== Access ==
The church and convent are open to the public and may be visited.
