= Mucugê Airport =

Mucugê Airport Aeroporto de Mucugê
- IATA: CHD; ICAO: SNQU; LID: BA0032

Summary
- Airport type: Public
- Serves: Mucugê
- Time zone: BRT (UTC−03:00)
- Elevation AMSL: 1,055 m (3,461 ft)
- Coordinates: 13°01′54″S 041°26′40″W

Map
- Location in Brazil

Runways
Direction	Length		Surface
Direction	m	ft	Surface
07/25	1,400	4,593	Asphalt
- Sources: ANAC, DECEA

Mucugê Airport (IATA: CHD, ICAO: SNQU) is the airport serving Mucugê and Chapada Diamantina National Park, Brazil.

== Access ==
The airport is located 11 km (7 mi) from downtown Mucugê.

== See also ==
- List of airports in Brazil
