= Mucugê =

Municipality of Bahia, Brazil

Coordinates: 13°00′18″S 41°22′15″W

- Municipality
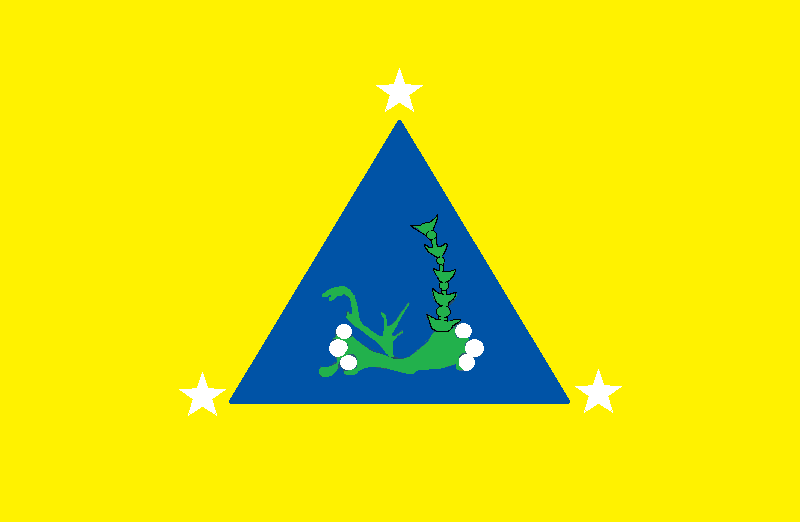
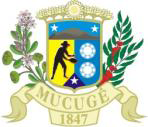
- Flag Coat of arms
- Interactive map of Mucugê
- Country: Brazil
- Region: Nordeste
- State: Bahia

Population (2020)
  - Total: 8,889
- Time zone: UTC−3 (BRT)

Mucugê is a municipality in the state of Bahia, in the North-East region of Brazil. It is close to the Chapada da Diamantina National Park.

Initially inhabited by the Maracás Indians, the actual occupation occurred during the golden times of mineral prospection, from 1710, when gold was found near Contas River, marking the arrival of the explorers. In 1844, the colonization was boosted by the discovery of valuable diamonds in the surroundings of Mugugê River, and the traders, settlers, Jesuit priests and foreigners that lived in the villages controlled and regulated by the power of wealth.

== Transportation ==
The city and region are served by Mucugê Airport.

== See also ==
- List of municipalities in Bahia
