= Maraú =

Municipality of Bahia, Brazil

- Municipality
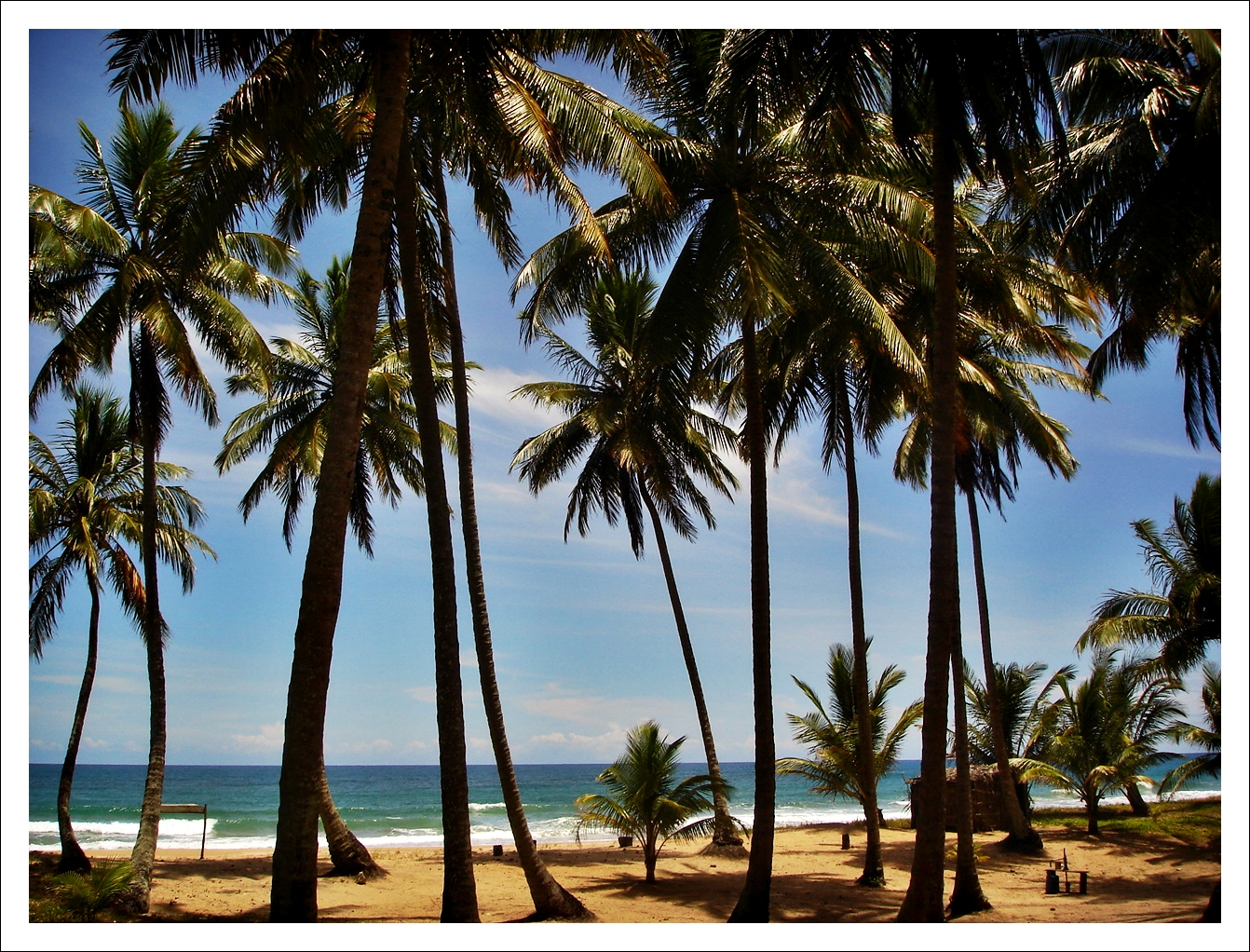

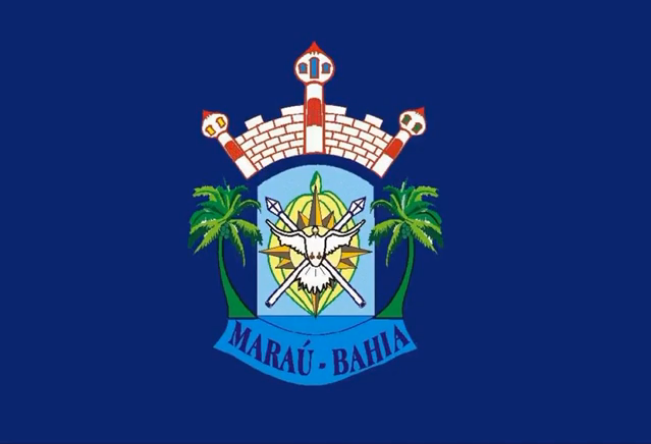
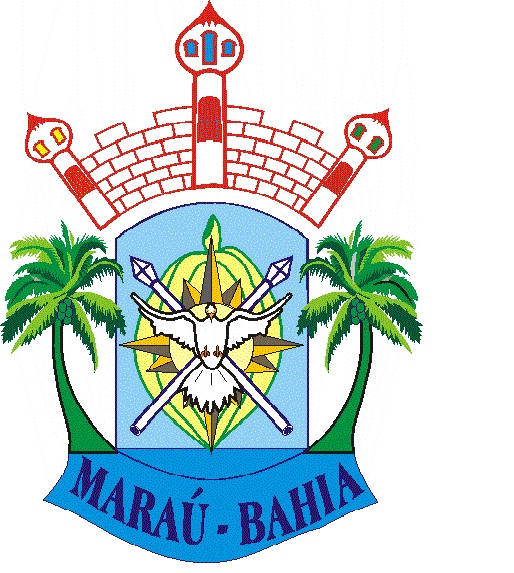
- Flag Coat of arms

- Location in Brazil
- Coordinates: 14°06′10″S 39°00′54″W
- Country: Brazil
- Region: Nordeste
- State: Bahia

Area
  - Total: 774.447 km^{2} (299.016 sq mi)

Population (2020)
  - Total: 20,617
- Time zone: UTC−3 (BRT)

Maraú is a municipality in the state of Bahia in the North-East region of Brazil. The municipality is located in a peninsula called "Península de Maraú", physiographic area called "Região Cacaueira" (cocoa region). The city is rich in minerals, especially oil shale gypsum and oil.

== History ==
The town originally called "Mayrahú" was an Indian village called "Mayra". No one knows about the disappearance of the Indian tribe, nor to which branch it belonged. The area was discovered in 1705 by Italian Capuchin friars who named it "São Sebastião de Mayrahú" (St. Sebastian of Mayrahú). In 1938 it became a city. Maraú has beautiful beaches of rare beauty and clear water surrounds most of its villages. It also has dozens of islands, waterfalls, mangroves ... Its best-known villages are: Barra Grande, Saquaíra, Taipus de Fora and Algodões

== Geography ==
The municipality contains 49.32% of the 118,000-hectare (290,000-acre) Baía de Camamu Environmental Protection Area, created in 2002.

=== Beaches ===
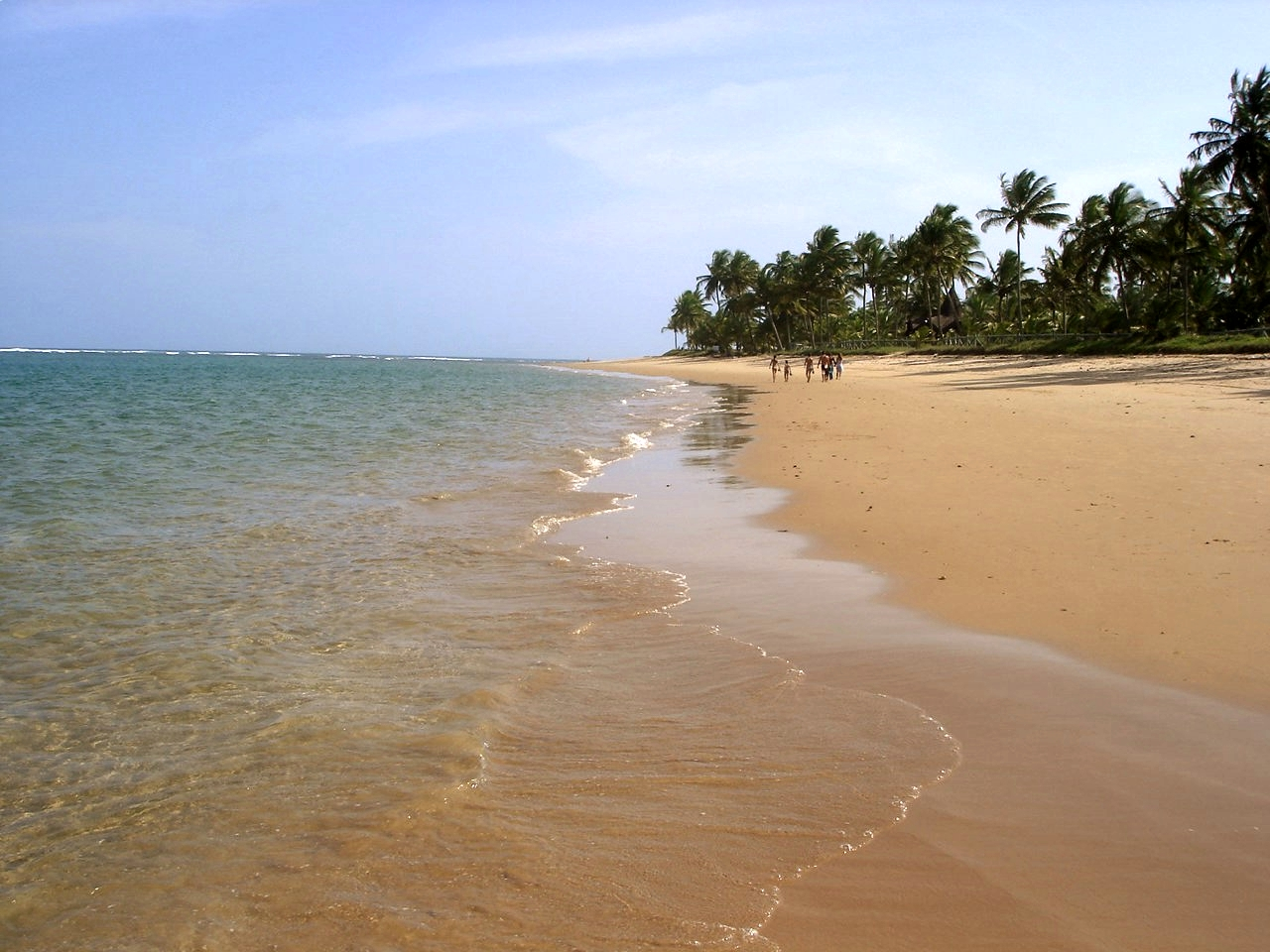
Taipus de Fora

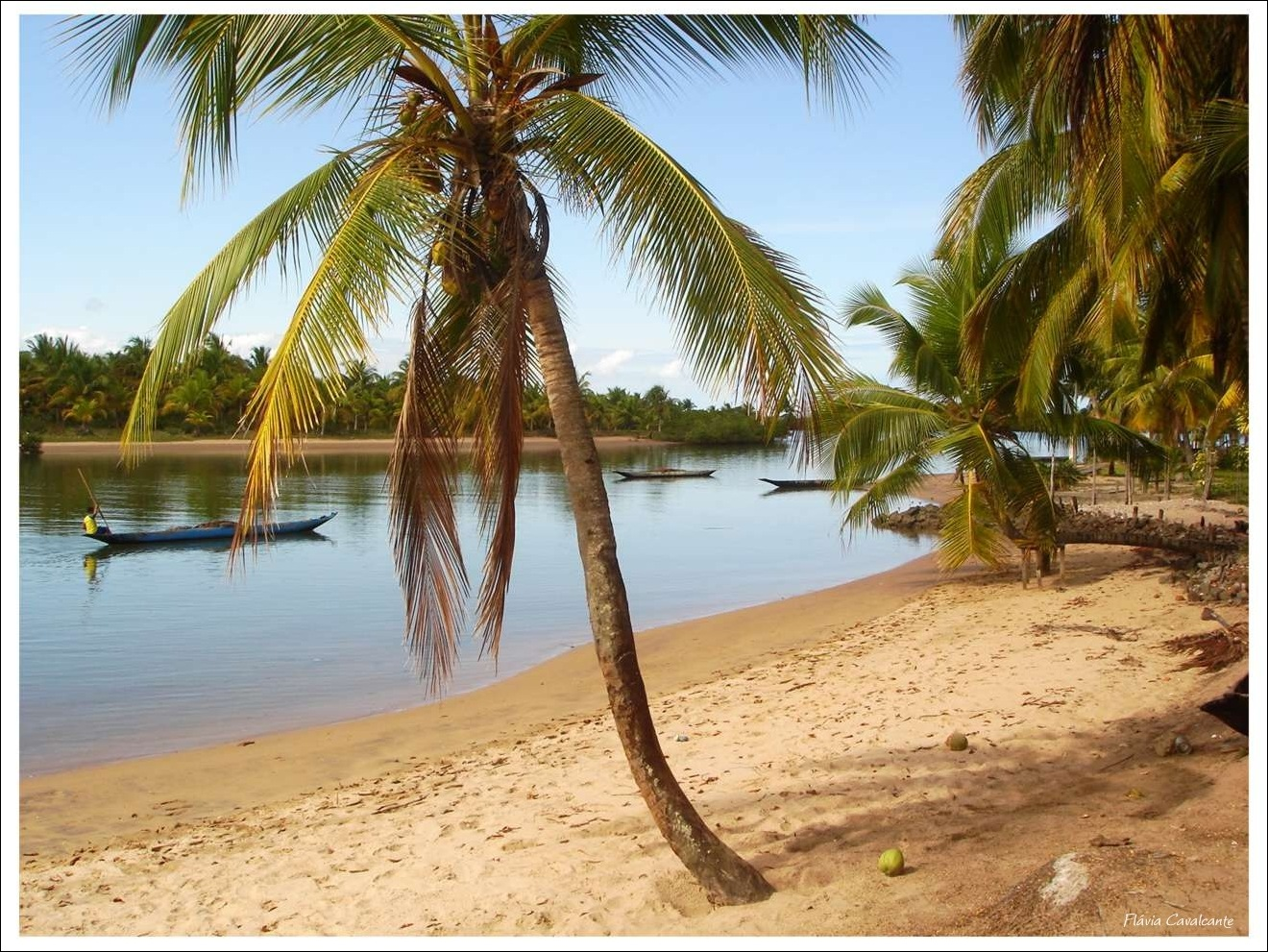
Campinho

- Algodões;
- Arandí;
- Barra;
- Cassange;
- Mangueira;
- Piracanga;
- Saquaíra;
- Três Coqueiros;
- Taipús de Fora;
- Campinho.

== Transportation ==
The municipality is served by Barra Grande Airport, located in the district of Barra Grande.

== See also ==
- List of municipalities in Bahia
