= Barra Grande Airport =

Barra Grande Airport Aeroporto de Barra Grande
- IATA: MUU; ICAO: SIRI; LID: BA0096

Summary
- Airport type: Private
- Serves: Barra Grande (Maraú)
- Time zone: BRT (UTC−03:00)
- Elevation AMSL: 10 m (33 ft)
- Coordinates: 13°54′22″S 038°56′24″W

Map
- Location in Brazil

Runways
Direction	Length		Surface
Direction	m	ft	Surface
11/29	1,400	4,593	Concrete
- Sources: ANAC, DECEA

Barra Grande Airport (IATA: MUU, ICAO: SIRI) formerly BRG, is the airport serving the district of Barra Grande in the Municipality of Maraú, Brazil.

== Accidents and incidents ==
- 14 November 2019: a private Cessna 550 Citation II, registration PT-LTJ, crashed and caught fire at landing after an unsuccessful go-around operation. Five of the ten occupants were killed.

== Access ==
The airport is located 4 km (2 mi) from downtown Barra Grande and 31 km (19 mi) from downtown Maraú.

== See also ==
- List of airports in Brazil
