= Guanambi Airport =

Isaac Moura Rocha Airport Aeroporto Isaac Moura Rocha
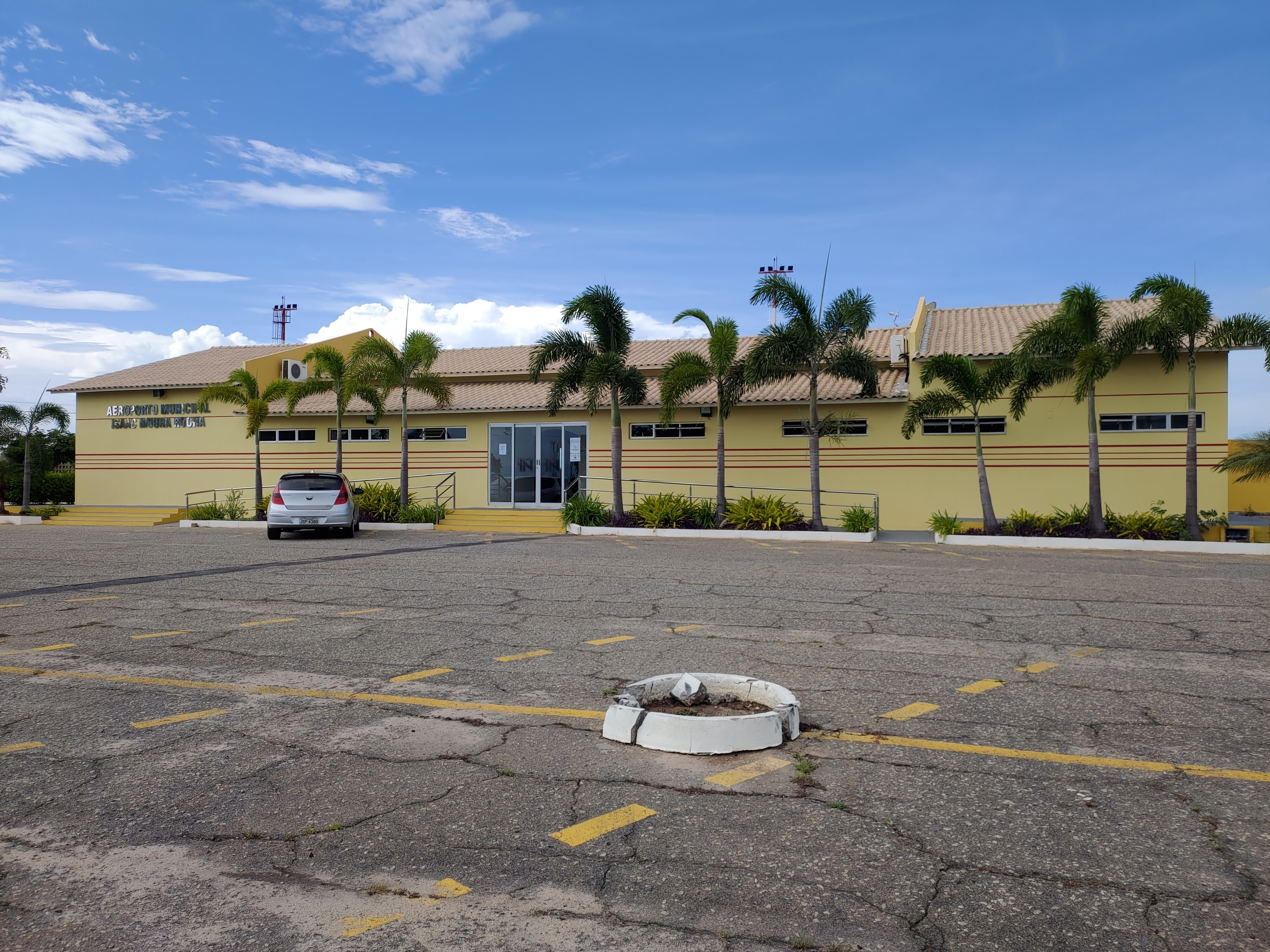
- IATA: GNM; ICAO: SNGI; LID: BA0009

Summary
- Airport type: Public
- Operator: Infracea
- Serves: Guanambi
- Time zone: BRT (UTC−03:00)
- Elevation AMSL: 553 m (1,814 ft)
- Coordinates: 14°12′29″S 042°44′46″W

Map
- Location in Brazil

Runways
Direction	Length		Surface
Direction	m	ft	Surface
14/32	1,700	5,577	Asphalt
- Sources: ANAC, DECEA

Isaac Moura Rocha Airport (IATA: GNM, ICAO: SNGI) is the airport serving Guanambi, Brazil.

It is operated by Infracea.

== History ==
Since August 15, 2019 the airport is managed by the concessionary Infracea.

== Airlines and destinations ==
Airlines	Destinations
Azul Brazilian Airlines	Belo Horizonte–Confins, Salvador da Bahia

== Accidents and incidents ==
- 3 February 1992: a Nordeste Embraer EMB 110 Bandeirante registration PT-TBB operating flight 92 from Salvador da Bahia to Guanambi descended below minimum levels in bad weather and crashed on a hill hidden by clouds near Caetité. All 12 passengers and crew aboard died.

== Access ==
The airport is located 4 km (2 mi) from Guanambi city centre.

== See also ==
- List of airports in Brazil
