= Morro de São Paulo Airport =

Lorenzo Airport Aeroporto de Lorenzo
- IATA: MXQ; ICAO: SNCL; LID: BA0131

Summary
- Airport type: Private
- Serves: Morro de São Paulo (Cairu)
- Time zone: BRT (UTC−03:00)
- Elevation AMSL: 1 m (3.3 ft)
- Coordinates: 13°23′22″S 038°54′36″W

Map
- Location in Brazil

Runways
Direction	Length		Surface
Direction	m	ft	Surface
04/22	805	2,641	Asphalt
- Sources: ANAC, DECEA

Morro de São Paulo Airport (IATA: MXQ, ICAO: SNCL), also known as Lorenzo Airport or Terceira Praia Airport, is the airport serving the district of Morro de São Paulo in Cairu, Brazil.

Lorenzo Airport should not be confused with (ICAO: SDGX), an airport in the same district which also uses the name Morro de São Paulo Airport.

== Airlines and destinations ==
Airlines	Destinations
Abaeté Aviação	Salvador da Bahia

== Access ==
The airport is located 15 km (9 mi) from downtown Cairu and 1 km (1 mi) from Morro de São Paulo.

== See also ==
- List of airports in Brazil
