= Morro de São Paulo =

- Village
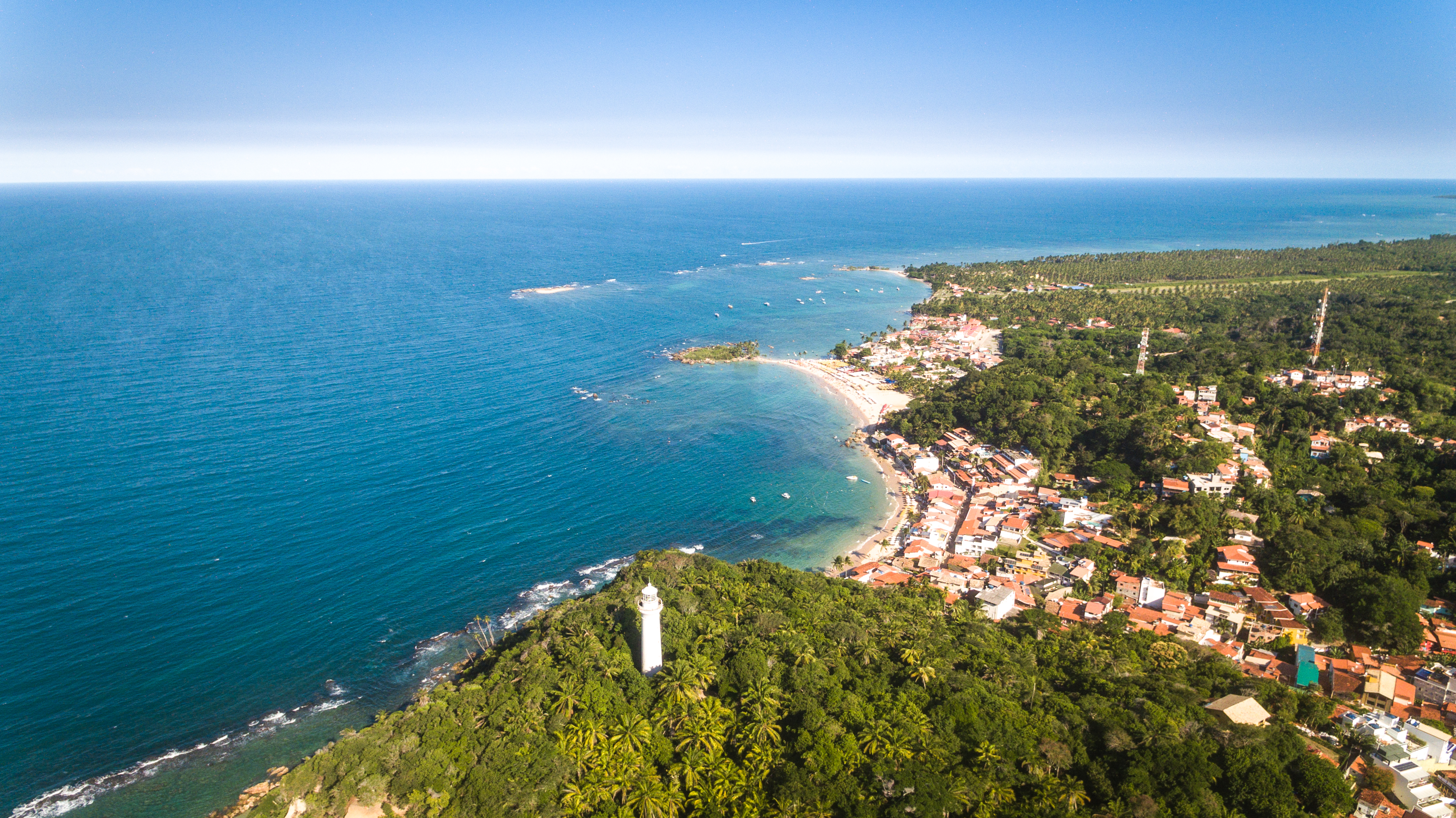
- View of Morro de São Paulo, Bahia

- Location of Morro de São Paulo in the State of Bahia
- Coordinates: 13°22′54″S 38°54′50″W
- Country: Brazil
- Region: Northeast
- State: Bahia
- Time zone: UTC-3 (BRT)
- Postal Code: 45400000
- Website: www.morrodesaopaulo.org.br

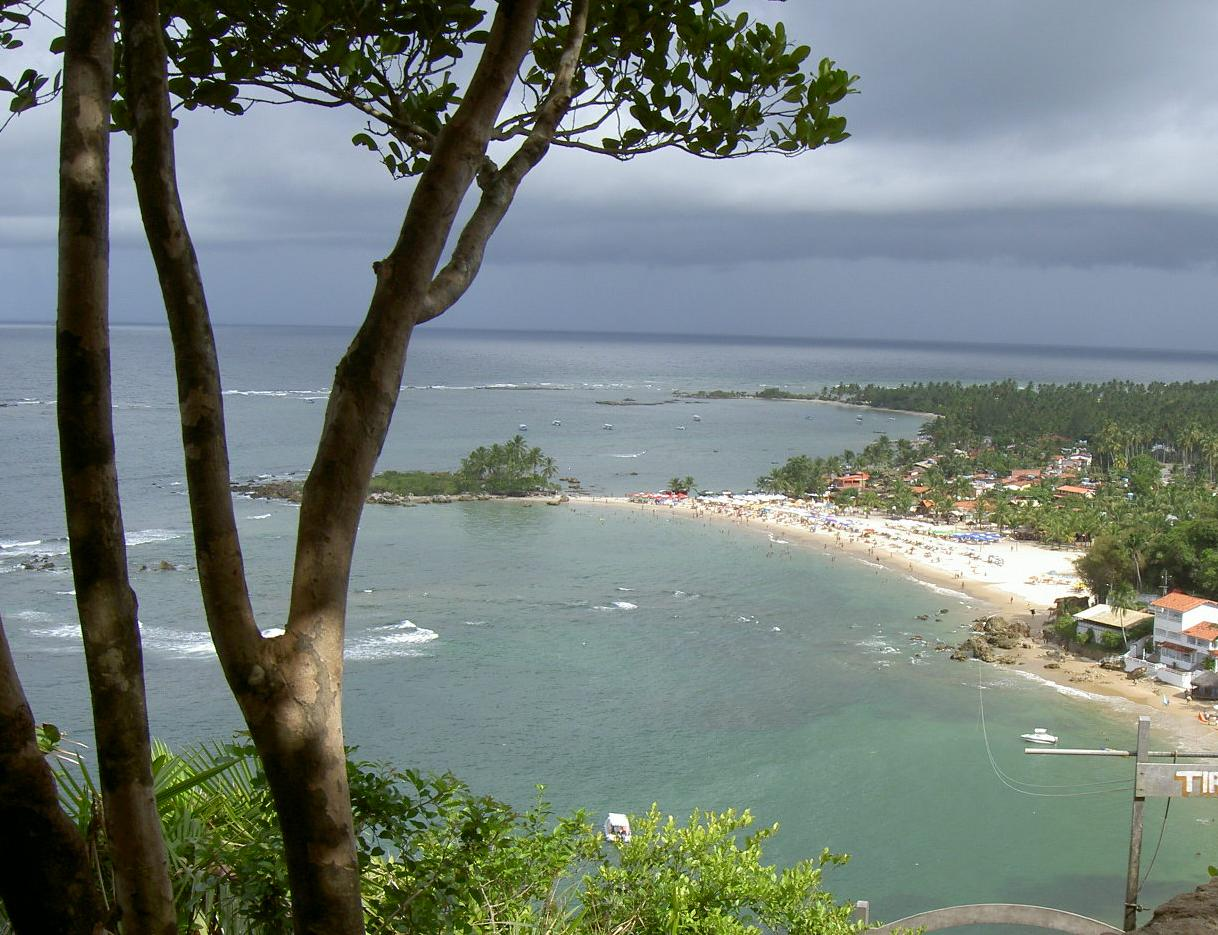
Morro de São Paulo

Morro de São Paulo (pronounced [ˈmoʁu dʒi sɐ̃w ˈpawlu]; lit. 'Hill of Saint Paul') is one of five villages of the island of Tinharé in the municipality of Cairu, Bahia, Brazil. The main beaches of the Morro de São Paulo are located on east side of the island. They are: Primeira Praia, Segunda Praia, Terceira Praia, Quarta Praia and Quinta Praia (also known as Praia do Encanto). The settlement was home to a large Tupinambá population prior to the arrival of the Portuguese. A Portuguese colony was established as early as 1535. The settlement is a site of large-scale tourism, and has three registered historic sites.

== History ==
Martim Afonso de Sousa, landed in 1531 and baptized this island "Tynharéa" and the Bahian accent soon transformed that name to "Tinharé". In 1535 the village of Morro de São Paulo was founded in the extreme north of the island by Francisco Romero and the local population.

Morro de Sao Paulo was the site of patrols and attacks by German submarines between 1942 and 1945 as part of German naval attacks across the coast of Bahia and Sergipe during World War II. The German government initially targeted merchant ships off Bahia and Sergipe, but civilian casualties were numerous.

The German submarine U-507 attacked the Itagiba off the Morro de São Paulo Lighthouse, killing the majority of the 179 passengers. The citizen of Bahia experienced scarcity, speculation, and famine due to the threat of German attack from 1942 to 1945; Morro de São Paulo was largely abandoned by the federal government and suffered from both famine and lawlessness.

== Education ==
Morro de São Paulo is home to the Waldorf pedagogy school, Escola CreArte.

== Transportation ==
The village is 272 kilometres (169 mi) from Salvador da Bahia by road and ferry and 60 kilometres (37 mi) by sea. The village is also accessible by direct flights from Salvador da Bahia to Lorenzo Airport.

== Historic sites ==
Morro de São Paulo is home to three historic sites: the Fonte Grande of Morro de São Paulo, the Fortaleza do Morro de São Paulo, and the Morro de São Paulo Lighthouse.
