= Boipeba Airport =

Fábio Perini Airport Aeroporto Fábio Perini
- IATA: PBA; ICAO: SDLO; LID: BA0074

Summary
- Airport type: Private
- Serves: Boipeba (Cairu)
- Time zone: BRT (UTC−03:00)
- Elevation AMSL: 6 m (20 ft)
- Coordinates: 13°33′52″S 038°56′20″W

Map
- Location in Brazil

Runways
| Direction | Length | | Surface |
| Direction | m | ft | Surface |
|---|---|---|---|
| 13/31 | 1,270 | 4,167 | Concrete |
- Sources: ANAC, DECEA

Fábio Perini Airport (IATA: PBA, ICAO: SDLO), also called Fazenda Pontal is the airport serving the district of Boipeba in Cairu, Brazil.

== Access ==
The airport is located 10 km (6 mi) from downtown Cairu and 2 km (1 mi) from Velha Boipeba. Transportation is by boat.

== See also ==
- List of airports in Brazil
