= Guanambi =

Place in Northeast Brazil

- Municipality of Guanambi
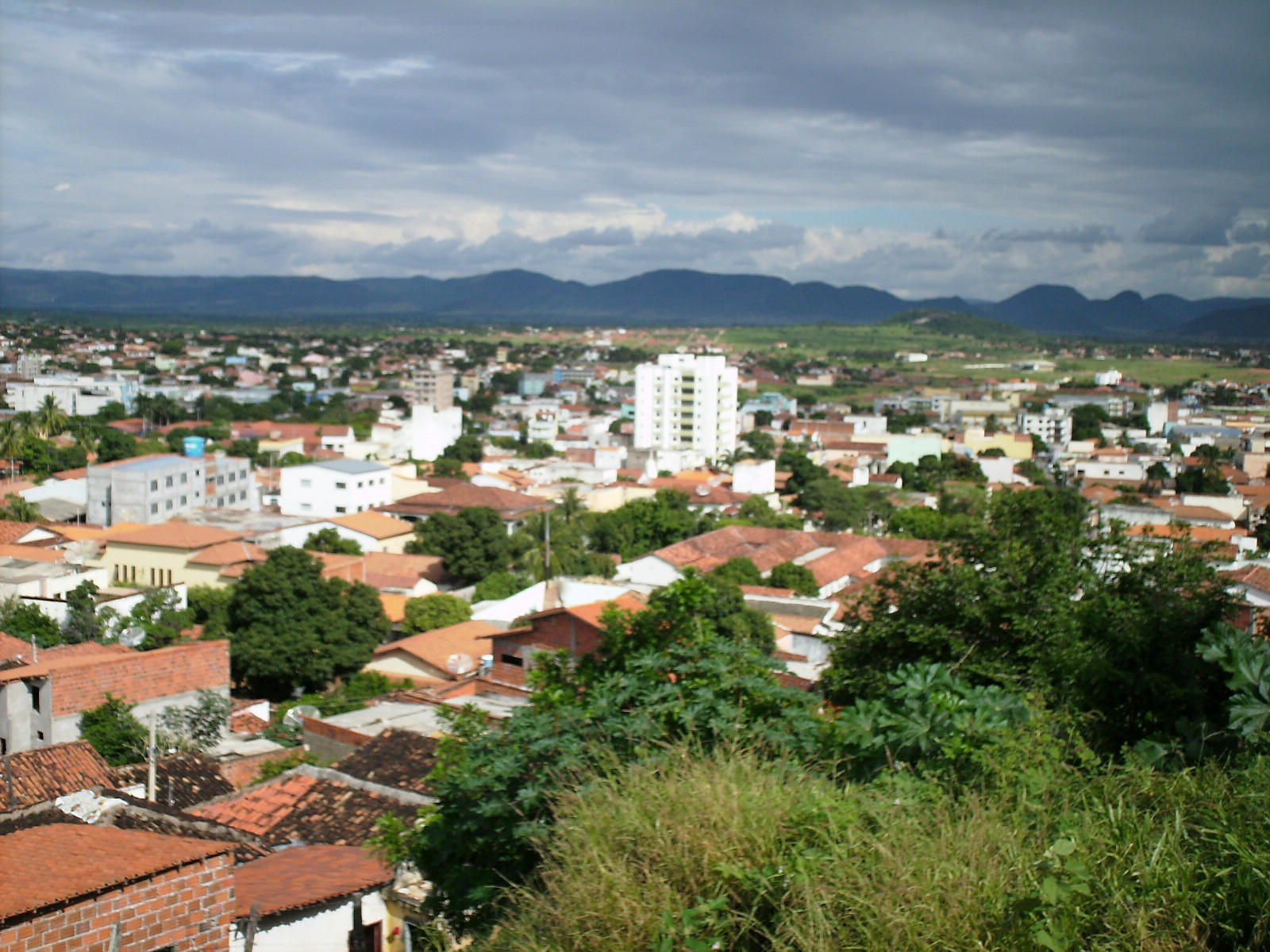

- Flag Coat of arms
- Nickname: Cidade do algodão (City of the cotton)
- Guanambi in a Bahia map.
- Coordinates: 14°13′22″S 42°46′51″W
- Country: Brazil
- Region: Northeast
- State: Bahia
- Demonym: guanambiense
- Founded: August 14, 1919

Government
  - Mayor: Arnaldo Pereira de Azevedo (Avante)

Area
  - Total: 1,272.367 km^{2} (491.264 sq mi)
- Elevation: 525 m (1,722 ft)

Population (2020)
  - Total: 84,928
  - Density: 60.8/km^{2} (157/sq mi)
- Time zone: UTC−3 (BRT)
- Website: []

Guanambi is a municipality in Bahia, Brazil, with an area of 1,272.367 km², and with 84,928 inhabitants in 2020, according to estimates by the IBGE, making it the 20th most populous municipality of Bahia. It was founded in 1919 and Nilo Coelho is its current mayor.

Guanambi is home of the largest wind complex in Latin America.

== Transportation ==
It is 796 km (approximately 498 miles) south-west of Salvador, the capital being connected by the roads BR-030, BR-262 and BR-324, representing a strong influence in the commercial. The city is served by Guanambi Airport.

== Notable people ==
- Lucio (footballer, born 1982)

== See also ==
- List of municipalities in Bahia
