= Cairu =

Municipality of Bahia, Brazil

- Municipality
- Municipality of Cairu
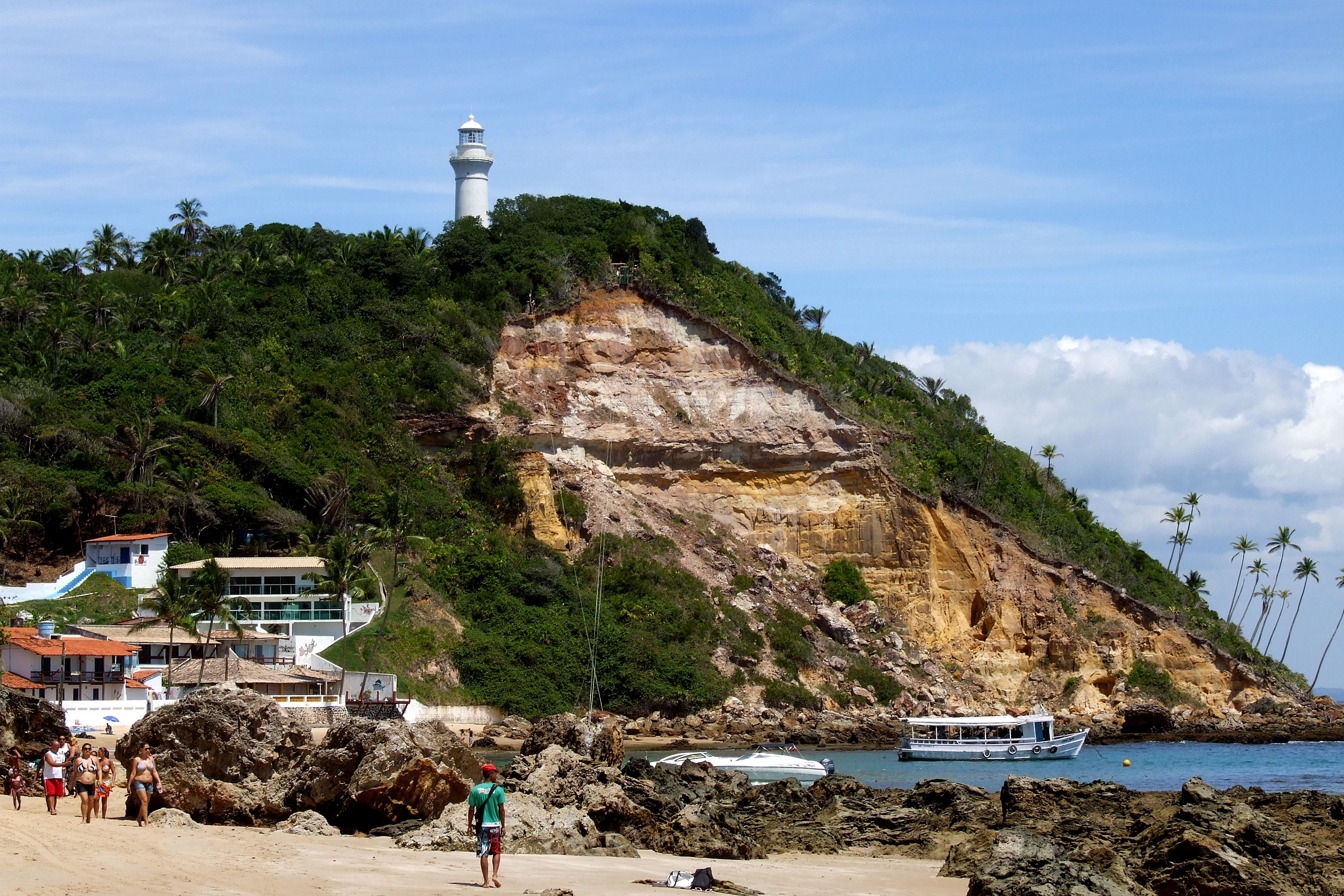
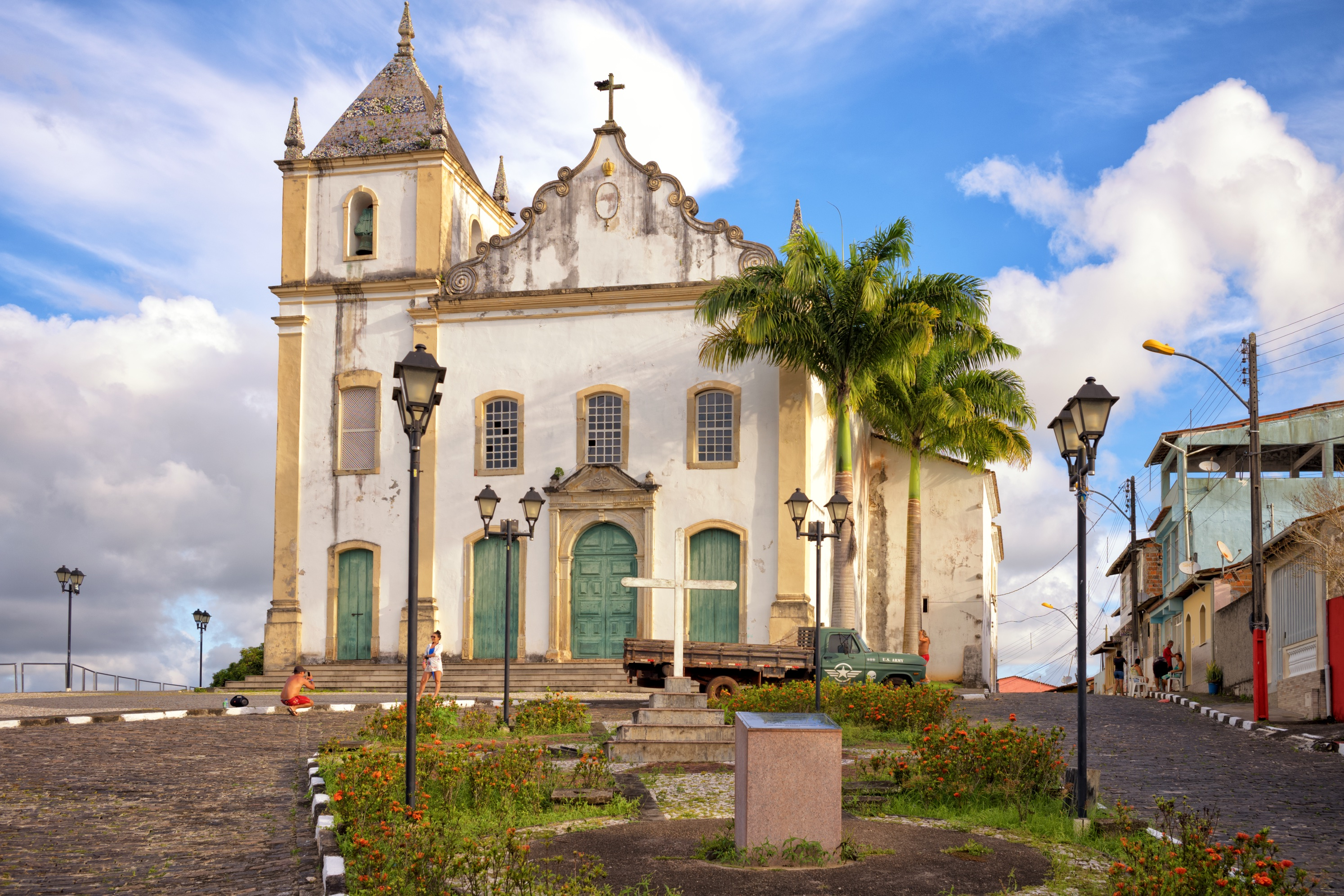
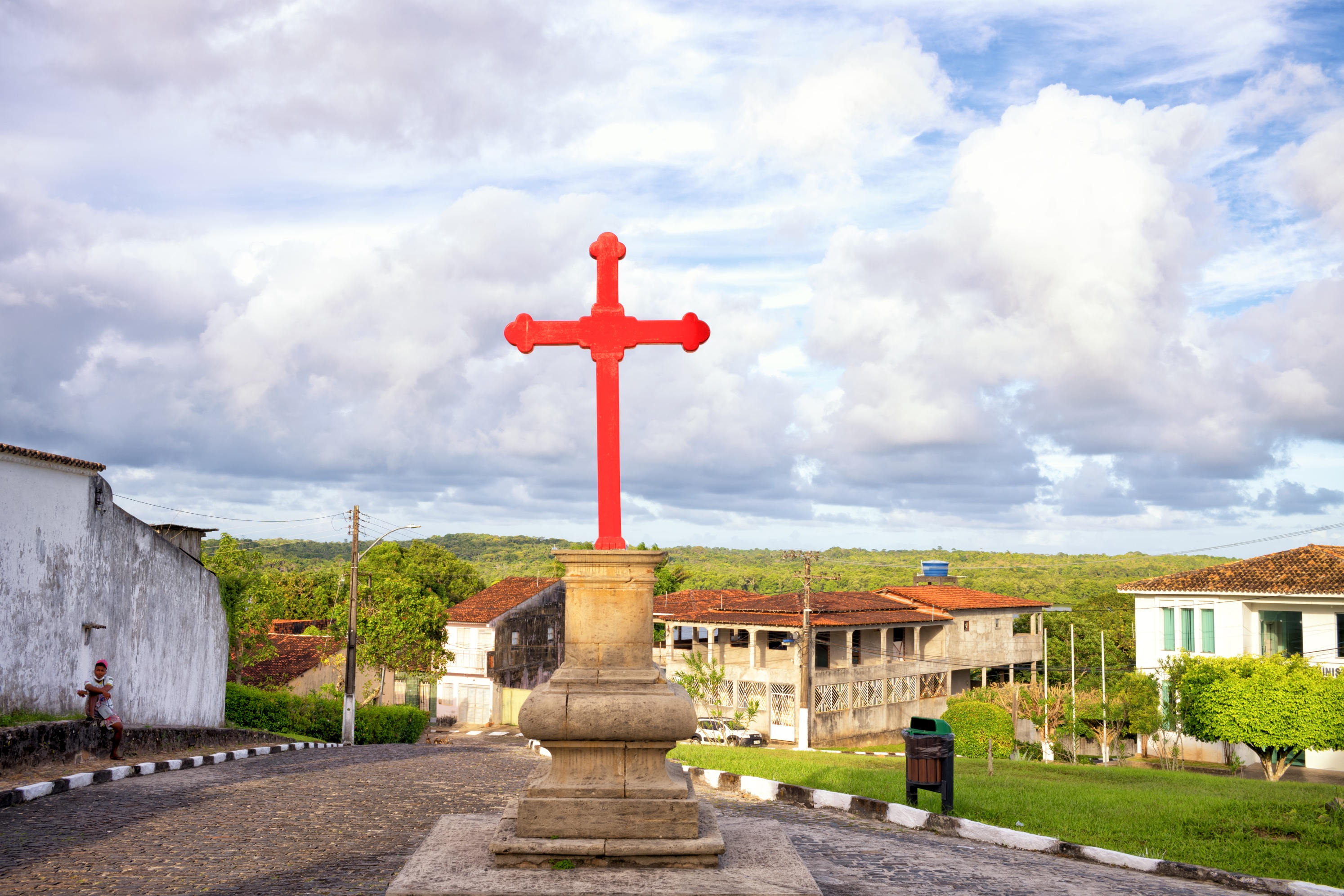
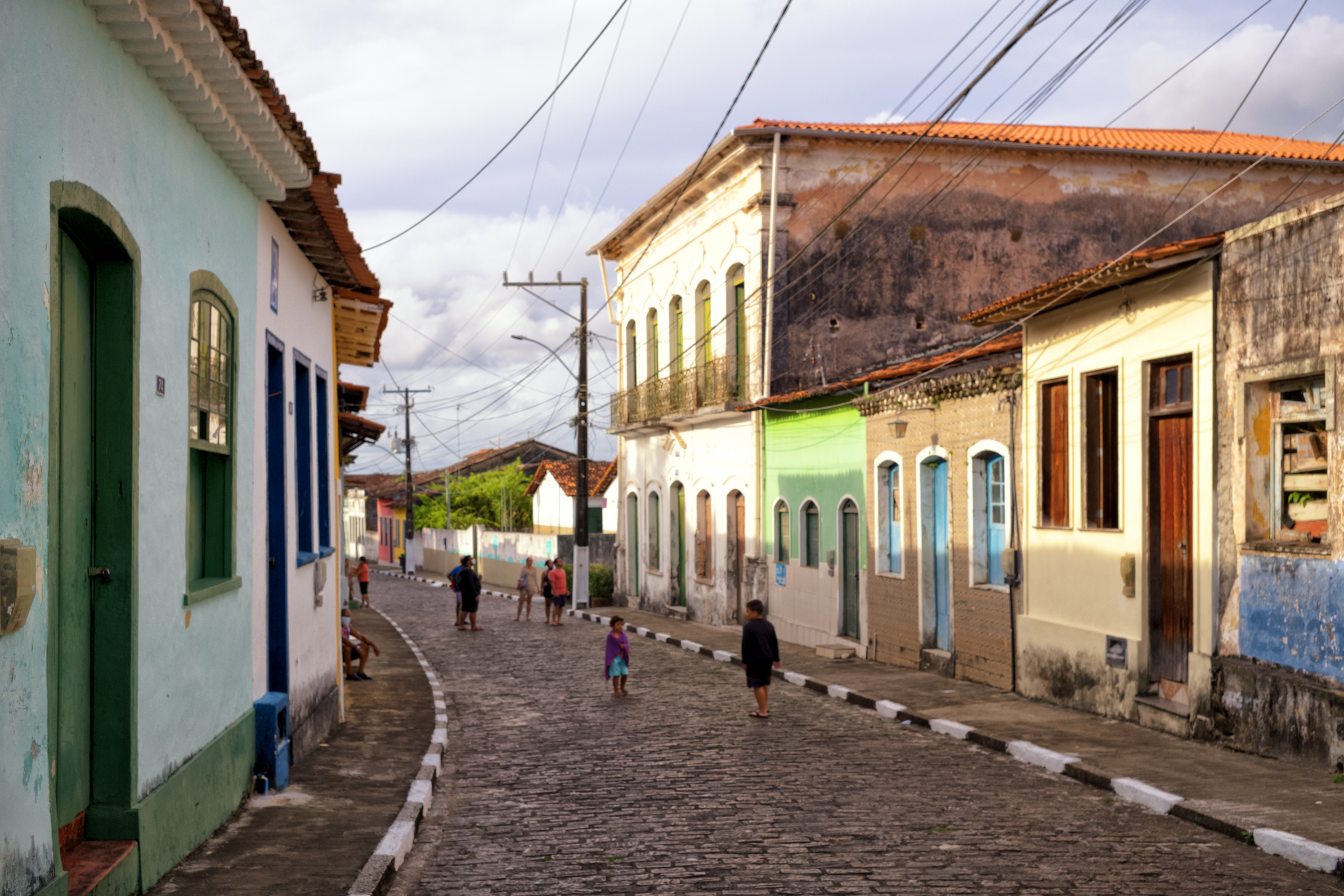
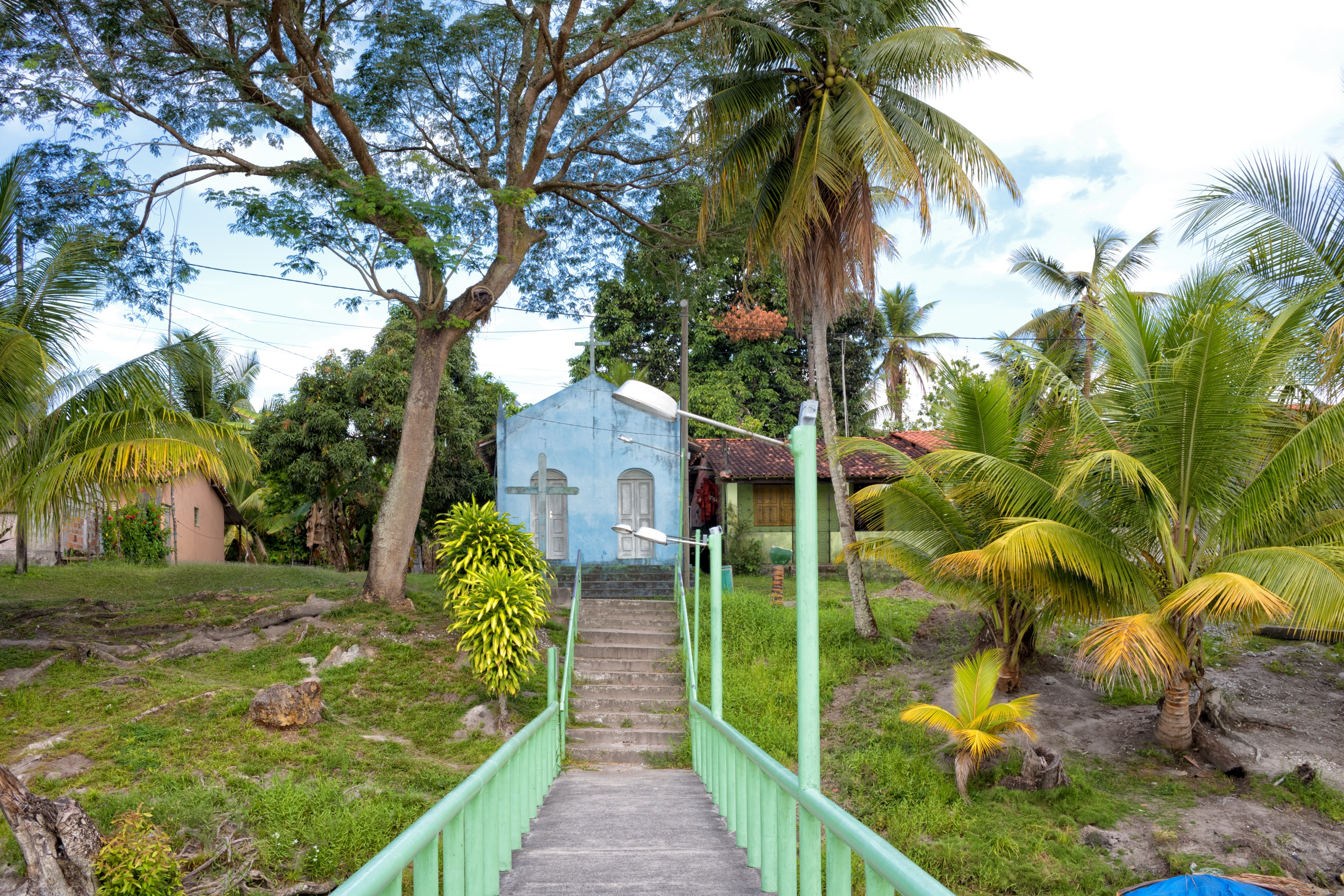
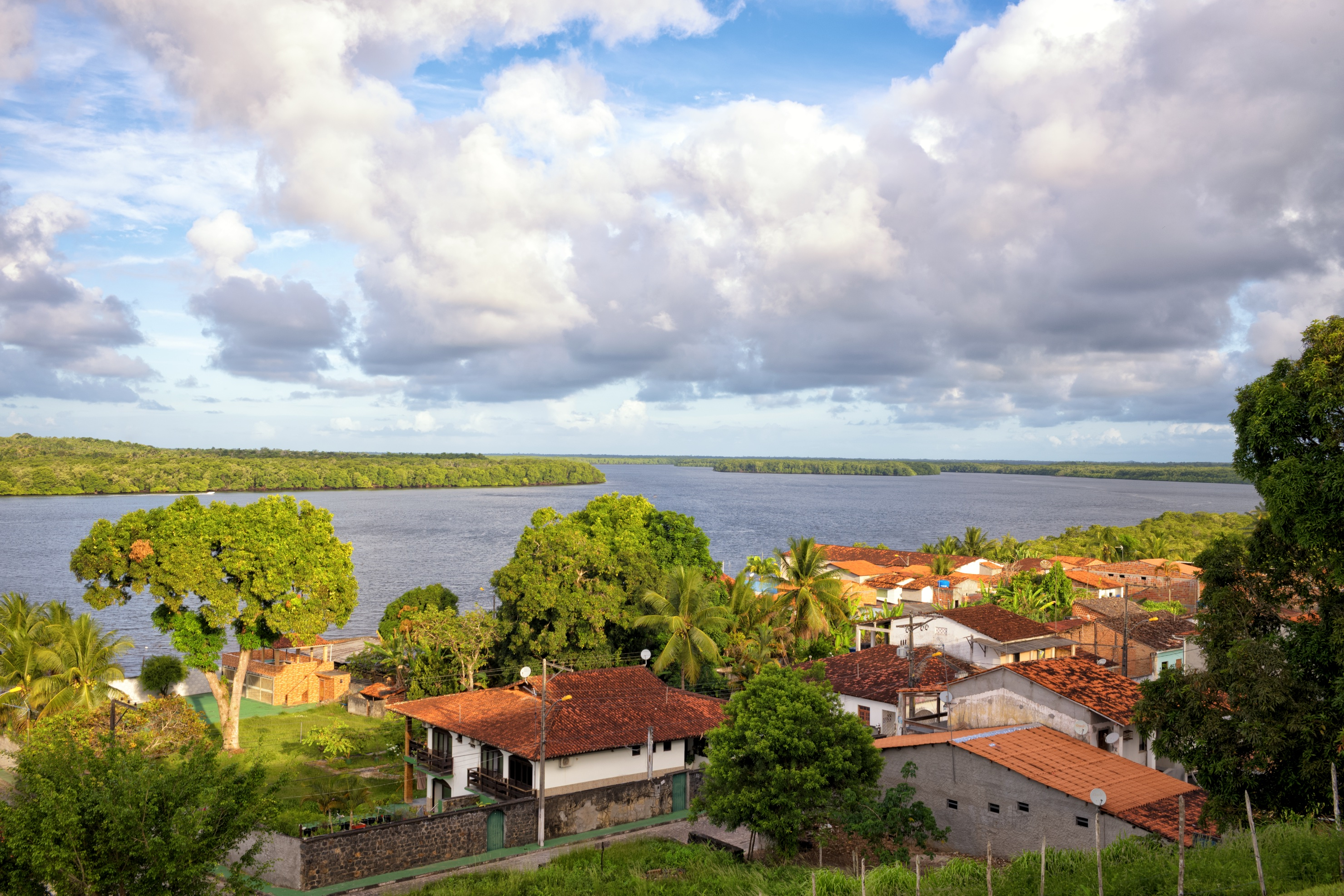
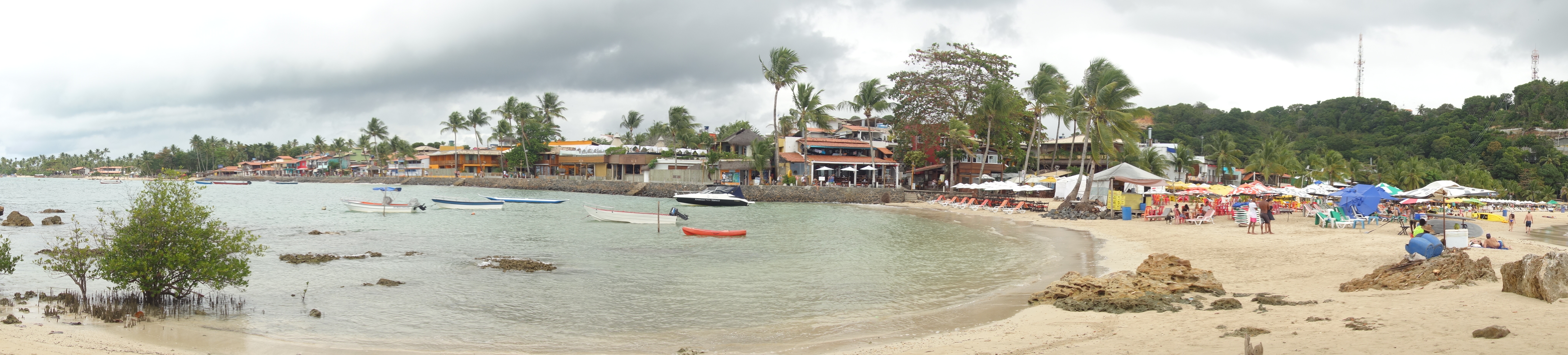

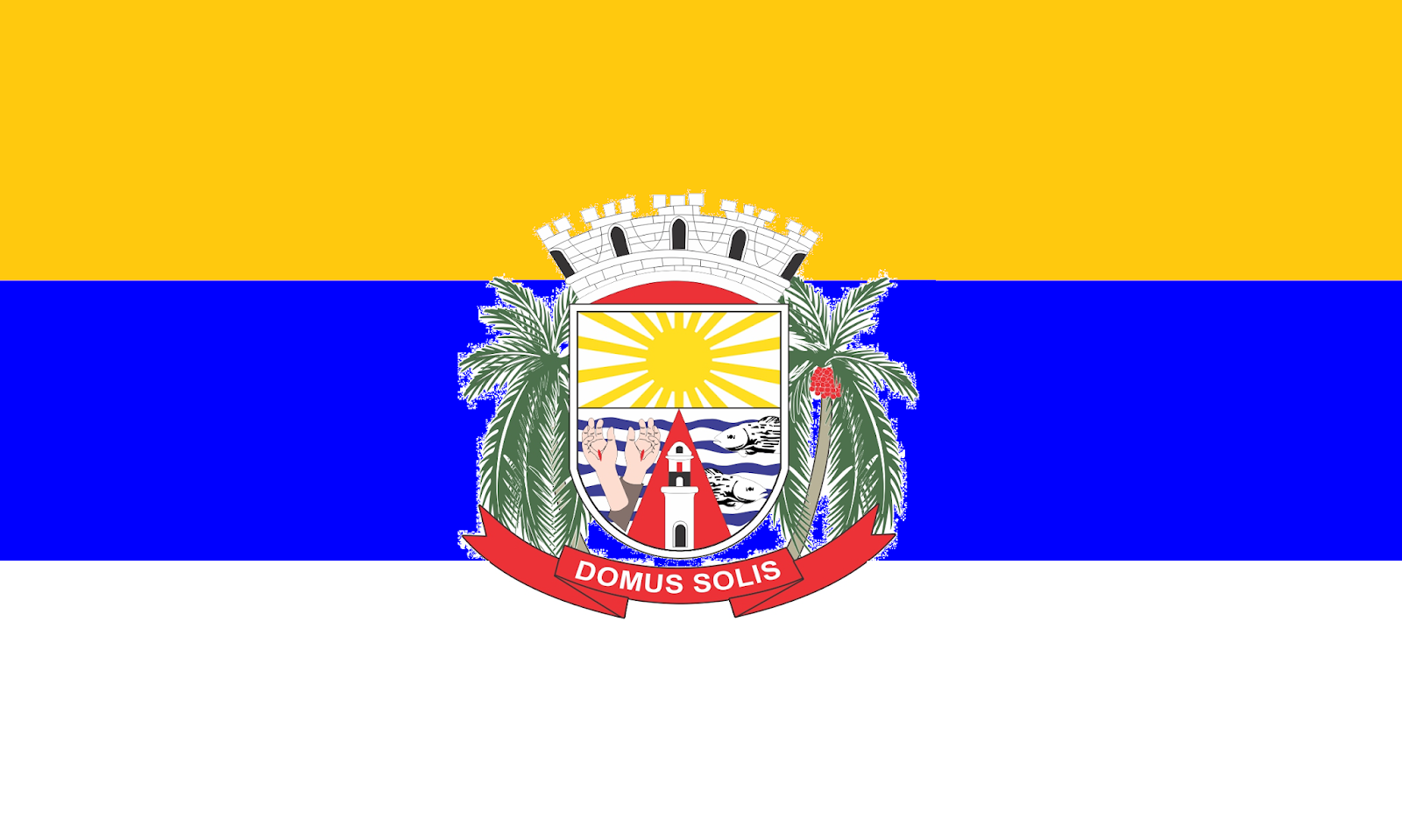
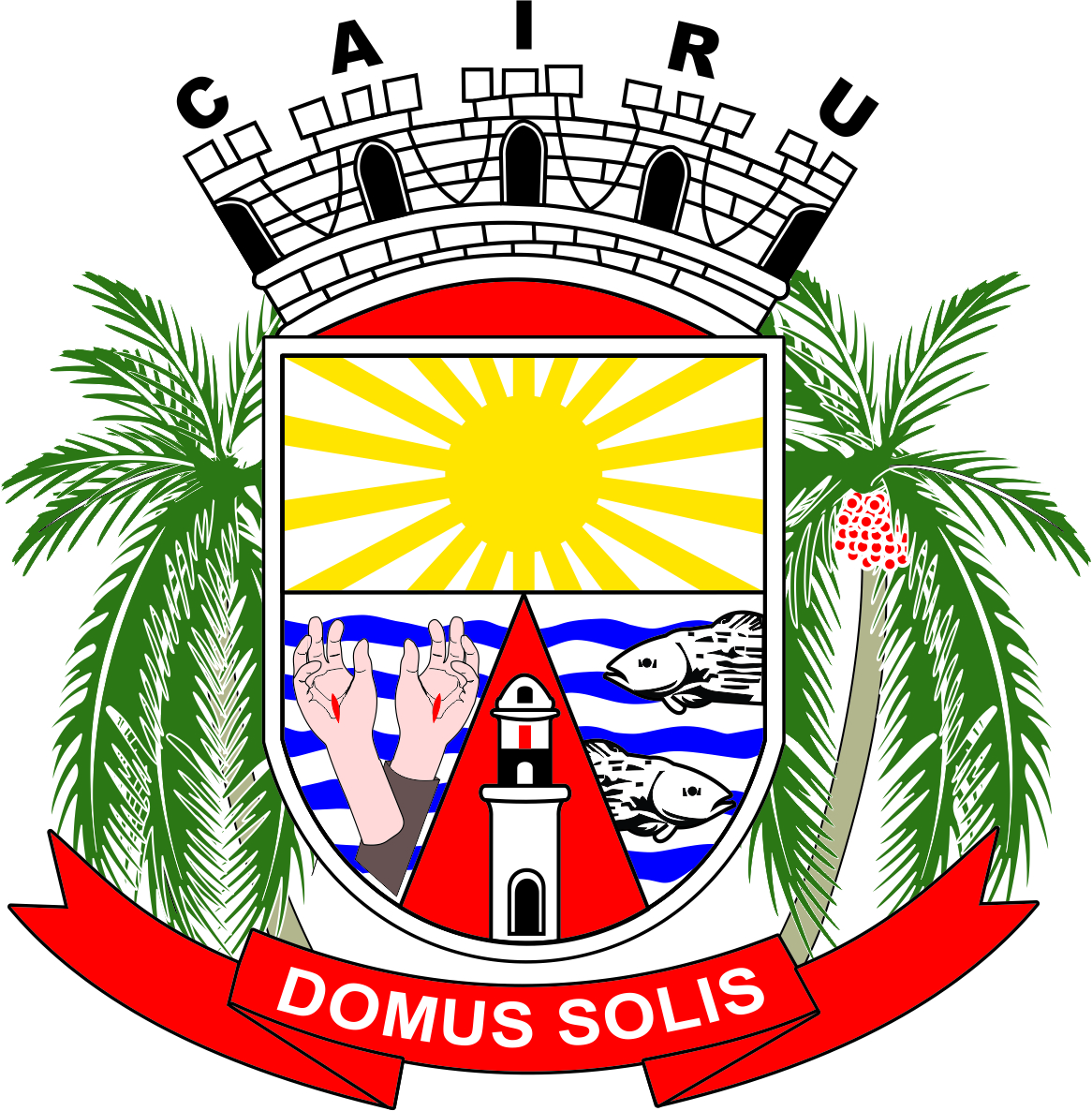
- Flag Coat of arms

- Location in Bahia
- Coordinates: 13°29′13″S 39°02′38″W
- Country: Brazil
- Region: Northeast
- State: Bahia
- Founded: 1608

Government
  - Mayor: Fernando Antonio dos Santo Brito

Area
  - Total: 451.194 km^{2} (174.207 sq mi)

Population (2022)
  - Total: 17,761
  - Density: 39.364/km^{2} (101.95/sq mi)
- Time zone: UTC−3 (BRT)
- HDI (2010): 0.627 – medium
- Website: cairu.ba.gov.br

Cairu is a municipality in the state of Bahia in the North-East region of Brazil. The municipality consists of three islands: the Island of Cairu, which is only separated from the mainland by a narrow river; Tinharé Island, which has the dense tourist settlement of Morro de São Paulo to the north; and Boipeba Island.

The municipality contains part of the 230,296-hectare (569,070-acre) of the Caminhos Ecológicos da Boa Esperança Environmental Protection Area, created in 2003.

== History ==
The Cairu region was home to a large population of Aimoré people. The Portuguese arrived in the area early in the 16th century and soon established a sugarcane plantation. Francisco Romeo, administrator of the Captaincy of São Jorge dos Ilhéus founded a small settlement in Cairu based on its mild climate. The settlers displaced the Aimoré and the settlement, known as the Vila de Nossa Senhora do Rosário do Cairú, was established in 1608. It was located on an elevation overlooking the Tinharé Channel, which leads directly to the Atlantic Ocean. The Franciscans arrived in 1654 to build the Convent and Church of Saint Anthony on another high point in the settlement. Cairu became a major producer of manioc flour and timber in the 17th century. The town was forced to contribute 166$000 annually for three decades to fund the rebuilding of Lisbon after the 1755 earthquake.

By 1911 the village consisted of five districts: Cairu, the village seat; Galeão; Gamboa; Morro de São Paulo; and Velha Boipeba. It was raised to city status in 1938.

== Historic structures ==
Cairu is home to numerous colonial-period historic structures, some designated as Brazilian state or national monuments. The historic center of Cairu (Centro Histórico de Cairu) lacks state or federal protection, but is home to numerous historic homes, government buildings, and churches.

- Convent and Church of Saint Anthony (Convento e Igreja de Santo Antônio)
- Parish Church of Our Lady of the Rosary (Igreja Matriz de Nossa Senhora do Rosário)
- Sobrado at Rua Direita, 34 (Sobrado à Rua Direita, 34)
- Sobrado Grande
- Former Town Hall (Antiga Prefeitura)
- Church of Saint Francis Xavier (Igreja de São Francisco Xavier )
- Casa com Veranda de Ferro
- Fort of the Morro de São Paulo (Fortaleza do Morro de São Paulo)
- Sítio de Morro de São Paulo
- Fonte Grande of Morro de São Paulo (Fonte Grande do Morro de São Paulo)
- Forte da Ponte
- Sobrado na Praça Aureliano O. de Lima
- Church of the Holy Spirit (Igreja Matriz do Divino Espírito Santo )
- Church of Saint Sebastian (Igreja de São Sebastão)

== Transportation ==
Cairu is served by Lorenzo Airport located in the district of Morro de São Paulo and by Fábio Perini Airport located in the district of Boipeba.

== Noted resident ==
Portugal football international Liedson was born in Cairu.

== See also ==
- List of municipalities in Bahia
