= Ilha de Tinharé =

Brazilian island

Coordinates: 13°30′S 38°58′W

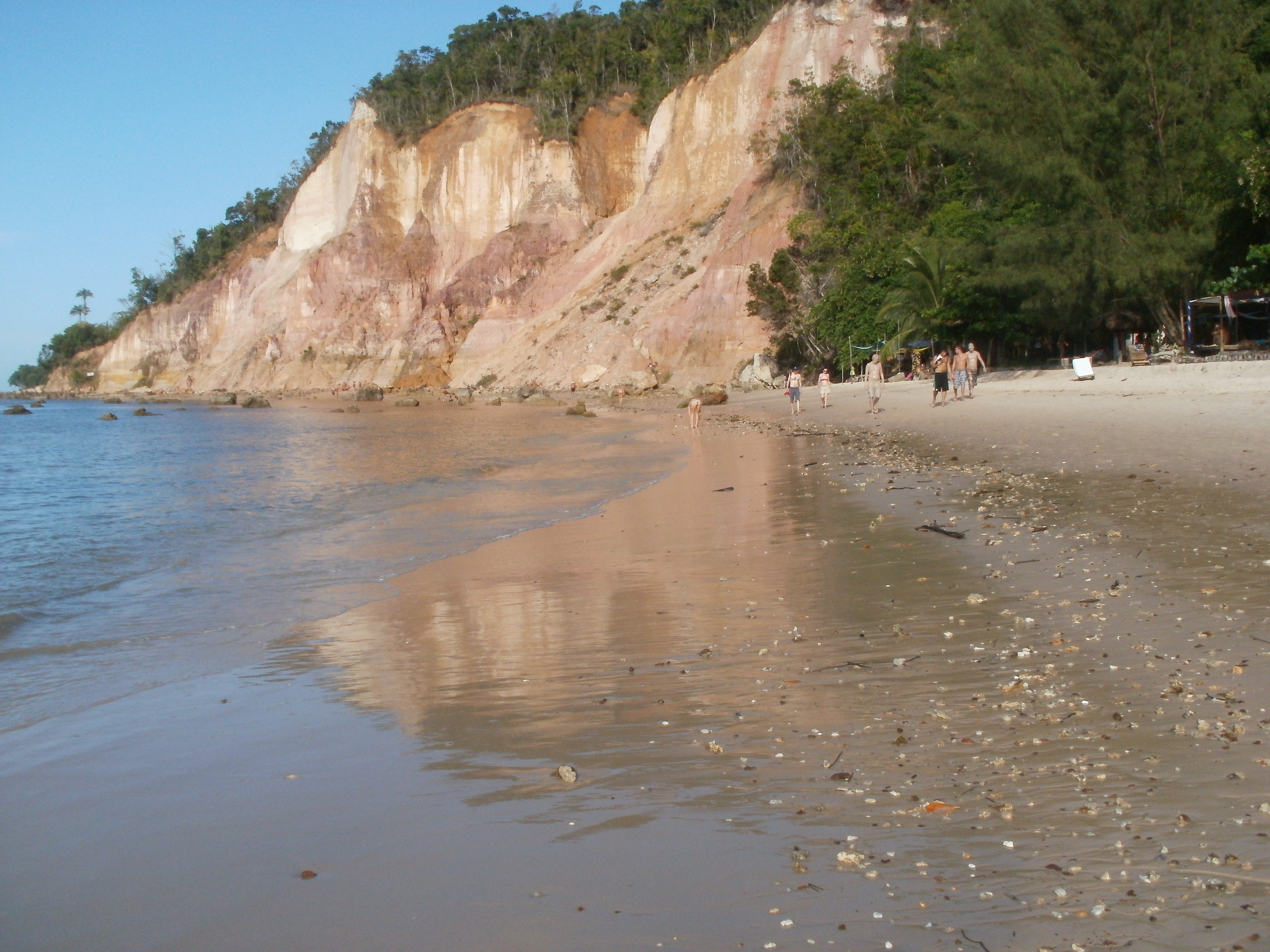
Clay's Beach in Tinharé Island, Bahia, Brazil

Ilha de Tinharé (Tinharé Island) is an island located in the municipality of Cairu, on the coast of Brazil with area of 400km^{2} (154 sq mi).

The town of Tinharé is accessible via catamaran or boat from the river that passes through the municipality of Valença.
