= Varig Flight 254 =

1989 aviation accident in Brazil

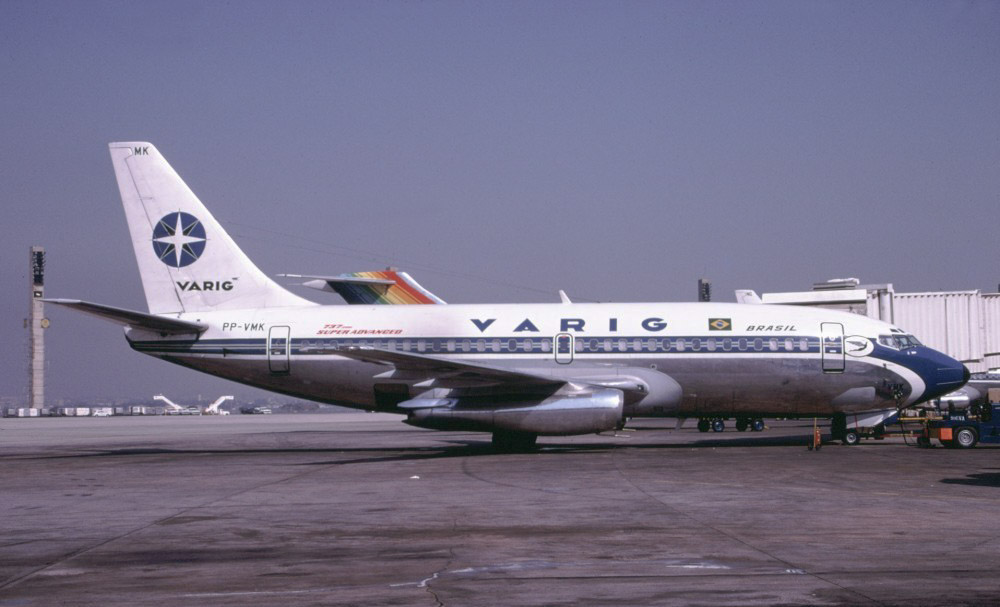
- PP-VMK, the aircraft involved in the accident, pictured in 1983

Accident
- Date: 3 September 1989
- Summary: Major navigational error resulting in fuel exhaustion
- Site: Near São José do Xingu, Brazil; 10°26′40.55″S 52°39′26.90″W

Aircraft
- Aircraft type: Boeing 737-241
- Operator: Varig
- IATA flight No.: RG254
- ICAO flight No.: VRG254
- Call sign: VARIG 254
- Registration: PP-VMK
- Flight origin: São Paulo–Guarulhos Int'l Airport
- 1st stopover: Uberaba Airport
- 2nd stopover: Uberlândia Airport
- 3rd stopover: Goiânia–Santa Genoveva Airport
- 4th stopover: Brasília International Airport
- 5th stopover: Imperatriz Airport
- 6th stopover: Marabá Airport
- Destination: Belém–Val de Cans Int'l Airport
- Occupants: 54
- Passengers: 48
- Crew: 6
- Fatalities: 12
- Injuries: 34
- Survivors: 42

Varig Flight 254 was a scheduled domestic passenger flight from São Paulo, Brazil, to Belém, capital city of the state of Pará in the country's North Region. On 3 September 1989, the Boeing 737-200 operating this flight had several intermediate stopovers, the last being in Marabá, Pará. Prior to takeoff from Marabá, the crew entered an incorrect heading into the flight computer, flying deep into a remote area of the Amazon jungle. Attempts to reach an alternative airport were unsuccessful and the plane eventually ran out of fuel, crashing during a belly landing in the jungle 1,700 kilometres (920 nautical miles) northwest of Rio de Janeiro. Of the 54 passengers and crew, 12 passengers died and many more sustained serious injuries. The survivors were rescued two days later.

== Background ==
The flight was a scheduled service from São Paulo to Belém with stopovers in Uberaba, Uberlândia, Goiânia, Brasília, Imperatriz, Marabá, and finally Belém. The São Paulo–Belém route had an approximate duration of eight hours and 20 minutes. At 9:43, Flight 254 left Guarulhos International Airport, São Paulo, heading towards Belém. The flight crew consisted of 32-year-old Captain Cézar Augusto Padula Garcez, First Officer Nilson de Souza Zille, 29, and four flight attendants. The flight went smoothly through all the stops, and at 17:20, the crew was arranging the final preparations at Marabá Airport while the passengers were boarding.

== Accident ==
Location of the accident and departure/destination airports. Airports relevant to the incident are marked in red.

While First Officer Zille was making an external inspection of the aircraft, Captain Garcez consulted the flight plan for the magnetic heading to Belém; the flight plan read 0270. Garcez interpreted this as 270°, but it was intended to mean 027.0°. Varig's heading notation for the flight plan was changed to four digits from three while Garcez was on vacation, and it did not explicitly specify the position for the decimal point, which was implicitly located between the last two digits. That confusion was the primary cause for the disaster, along with other minor errors. The captain, therefore, set the left-side horizontal situation indicator (HSI) to 270°, i.e. a due-west course. This heading is clearly inconsistent with a route from Marabá to Belém.

After setting the HSI, Garcez programmed the aircraft performance management system (PMS) to the distance to Belém (346 kilometres or 187 nautical miles). The flight plan indicated an altitude of 29,000 ft (8,800 m) (FL290), and a leg duration of 48 minutes. When co-captain Zille got to his seat, instead of checking his own flight plan to adjust his HSI – as he was required to do – he only referenced the captain's indicator and set his to match it. At 17:45, flight 254 took off from Marabá, and the autopilot steered the aircraft to a heading of 270° away. When Garcez believed the aircraft to be close to the destination, he attempted to use his VHF radio to communicate with the Belém tower. Failing to do so directly, he used another Varig airliner operating flight RG266, as a radio relay to talk to Belém Airport. When Garcez managed to establish communications with Belém, he requested descent clearance, and received it. Upon performing his descent, the captain found it very odd that he could not recognize any of the characteristic geographical features of the Belém area (such as the Marajó Island and the Amazon River estuary), and even asked the tower controller if the city was without electricity. In 1989, Belém airport still had no radar, so the controller informed Flight 254 that it was the only one in its airspace, and gave it landing clearance.

After the PMS started indicating negative distance to its destination, Captain Garcez decided to execute a 180° turn and locate Belém visually. He also descended the aircraft to 4,000 ft (1,200 m) and reduced its speed to 200 knots (370 km/h). Reluctant to use the HF radio to request help, the captain decided to take visual reference from a river he located below the plane, believing it to be the Amazon. The river was actually the Xingu, which runs chiefly south-north, while the Amazon runs west-east.

At that time, the flight had already taken 30 minutes longer than scheduled, and the passengers were getting anxious. When First Officer Zille finally noticed their initial mistake, the captain and he decided, after checking their navigation charts, to make contact with Santarém airport, believing it to be the closest airport, and made an almost 180° turn, now establishing a 350° magnetic course. After some calculations, Garcez realized that the aircraft did not have the necessary fuel to reach Santarém, and he started heading south again (along the now properly identified Xingu River). Finally, he decided to contact Marabá airport again, to find his location. The radio frequency of Goiânia's locator was the same as Marabá's, and Garcez mistakenly tuned to Goiânia, located about 1,250 km (675 nmi) south of Marabá. The captain was already nervous, and he failed to notice that the tuned locator's Morse code identifier was not consistent with Marabá's beacon.

At 20:05, Belém Center called Flight 254 again, demanding a report. The captain stated that he had a 170° magnetic heading to Marabá (in reality it was Goiânia), and that he was receiving a bearing from the Carajás beacon (which actually was the Barra do Garças beacon). Garcez was perplexed when Belém informed him that the Carajás beacon had been shut down since 19:30, and the center decided to illuminate the Carajás runway in an attempt to facilitate Flight 254's orientation. Realizing that he would not have enough fuel to reach Belém, the captain decided to head for Carajás Airport, which would have been the correct decision if he had not mistaken Goiânia for Marabá. Another opportunity to solve the situation was missed around 20:30, when the flight passed within 190 km (100 nmi) of the Serra do Cachimbo Air Force Base, a very large airfield, which the 737 could have successfully reached.

After that, the forced landing of the aircraft into the rainforest in the north of Mato Grosso became inevitable. At the time, no written procedures were available for such an emergency situation. Garcez and Zille decided to fly at 8,000 ft (2,400 m) until they ran out of fuel, thus avoiding a possible explosion upon landing, and with the engines on, they would still have hydraulic power to command the aircraft's ailerons and flaps. They also decided to keep the plane flying slightly above stall speed, which in this case was around 150 kn (280 km/h). During their descent, they spotted very few lights through the jungle, coming from the houses of farms that had electrical generators. At 20:40, Garcez informed the Belém center that he would be making a forced landing over the jungle. A few minutes later, when he had 15 minutes left of fuel, Garcez informed his passengers of the situation. When around 100 kg (220 lb) of fuel were remaining, the left engine stopped. The right engine ran for a further two minutes, and then stopped, as well.

Even after shutdown, the engines were still windmilling due to the passage of the air through them. This gave the airplane some rudimentary and unreliable hydraulic control. Garcez commanded the lowering of the flaps, which only moved to position two (around 10°) due to the failing hydraulic system. With the batteries discharged, the plane had no electrical power and the only four instruments working in the cockpit were the artificial horizon, altimeter, airspeed indicator, and vertical speed indicator. The only things the crew could see on the horizon were faint light spots due to distant forest burnings, and at 21:06, local time, the plane crash-landed over treetops that extended over 50 m (160 ft) above ground.

The deceleration due to the crash was such that passengers without fastened seatbelts were flung to the front of the airplane, and some seats detached from the floor, also racing forward. When the aircraft fell through the foliage, two thick trees tore away both wings, and caused a severe torsion of the fuselage, which contributed to more seats detaching, and to the collapsing of the false roof over the passengers' heads. After its speed slowed to about 35 kn (65 km/h), the aircraft ran for little more than 30 m (100 ft) and stopped, lying on its right side.

== Search and rescue ==
On 5 September, two days after the crash, Alfonso Saraiva and three other survivors started walking to look for help. After about two or three hours of walking in the jungle, the group found the house of the Curunaré farm, in São José do Xingu. The farm had no radio, so they were taken by car to another farm, Serrão da Prata, reaching it around 12:30. With the help of radio operator João Capanema Jr., they were able to contact Franca Airport, 400 km (220 nmi) north of São Paulo, and at 16:27, an Embraer EMB-110 Bandeirante airplane from the Brazilian Air Force (FAB) dropped food packages over the wreckage. By noon the next day, on their fourth day in the jungle, all survivors had been rescued by the FAB.

Forty-one survivors were rescued from the crash site by helicopter, which flew them 50 km (25 nmi) to São José do Xingu, and from there they were flown by plane to Cachimbo Airport, 300 km (160 nmi) to the northwest. They were then flown to Brasília Base Hospital near Brasília.

== Causes ==
Upon investigation, the crash was found to have been caused primarily by negligence on the part of the flight crew. Customary investigations showed that the aircraft was in perfect condition for the flight, and that its mandatory periodic inspections had been properly conducted. The main factor for the accident was concluded to be an error in reading the correct heading from the flight plan by the commander, compounded by the co-pilot copying the setting from the commander's panel instead of checking the flight plan. The fact that plan course 0270 actually asked for 027.0 degrees was due to the Varig standardization of flight planning for all its fleet, but only aircraft equipped with an inertial navigation system (INS) actually used headings with decimals. Despite the pilots having been told about this peculiarity in the airline's training program, the value expressed in the flight plan 0270 was interpreted by the commander as 270° (he was on vacation during the change of standard). This misinterpretation changed the general direction from north-northeast (27.0°) to west (270°). The Boeing 737 was not equipped with INS, using only automatic direction finders and VHF omnidirectional range.

Months after the accident, the flight plan Varig 254 used was shown to 21 pilots of major airlines in the world during a test conducted by the International Federation of Air Line Pilots' Associations. No fewer than 15 pilots committed the same mistake that the Flight 254 crew had made. After the accident, Varig installed Omega navigation systems in their aircraft.

Also, several other factors contributed to the accident:

- the pilot did not realise he should be receiving a stronger VHF signal from Belém if he were nearing that airport,
- he should be receiving the local radio stations from Belém instead of other distant stations at the same frequencies,
- he should have checked his position and heading against the sun and geographic landmarks,
- and the airline's support team in Belém did not take action upon realizing the aircraft arrival was delayed.

Captain Garcez and First Officer Zille were both sentenced to four years in prison for their roles in the accident, but this was later changed to community service.

== Dramatization ==
The events of Flight 254 were featured in season 14 of the TV series Mayday, in an episode named "Vanishing Act".

== See also ==
- Air navigation
- Air traffic control
- Dead reckoning
- Emergency position-indicating radiobeacon station
- Flight plan
- Flight planning
- Gol Transportes Aéreos Flight 1907 – another 737 which crashed 65 km (40 mi) away from Varig Flight 254's crash site
- List of airline flights that required gliding
- Navigation
- Pilot error
- Piloting (navigation)
- Situation awareness

== Bibliography ==
- Germano da Silva, Carlos Ari César (2008). "Rumo errado". O rastro da bruxa: história da aviação comercial brasileira no século XX através dos seus acidentes 1928–1996 (in Portuguese) (2 ed.). Porto Alegre: EDIPUCRS. ISBN 978-85-7430-760-2.
