= DIQ =

DIQ, diq or Diq may refer to:

- Digital Intelligence Quotient, Digital literacy evaluation system (by Center for Digital Literacy)
- Divinópolis Airport, Brazil (by IATA code)
- Dimli (or Southern Zaza), a language spoken in Turkey (by ISO 639 code)
- Diagnostic Impotence Questionnaire
- Reko Diq, a town in Pakistan
- Dinagaon Station, India (code DIQ)
