= São José do Xingu =

Coordinates: 10°48′14″S 52°44′09″W

- Municipality
- Country: Brazil
- Region: Center-West
- State: Mato Grosso
- Mesoregion: Nordeste Mato-Grossense

Population (2020)
  - Total: 5,620
- Time zone: UTC−3 (BRT)

São José do Xingu is a municipality in the state of Mato Grosso, in the Central-West Region of Brazil.

== Plane crash ==
On 3 September 1989, a Varig Boeing 737-241 registration PP-VMK, operating flight 254 flying from São Paulo-Guarulhos to Belém-Val de Cães with intermediate stops, crashed near São José do Xingu while on the last leg of the flight between Marabá and Belém due to a pilot navigational error, which led to fuel exhaustion and a subsequent belly landing into the jungle, 40 km from São José do Xingu. Out of 54 occupants, there were 13 fatalities, all of them passengers. Only 7 of the passengers died as a direct result of the crash, the other 6 occupants died after the crash, due to injuries and at least partially caused by the delayed arrival of rescue resources. Since the flight crashed about 1.200 km away from its intended destination, caused by flying into the wrong direction immediately after take-off - first west, then south, instead of the required north-eastern direction - the search and rescue operations focused on a completely wrong region, much closer to the actual destination of Belém. The survivors were discovered only after 4 of the occupants walked for 3 hours through the forest to find help.

== See also ==
- List of municipalities in Mato Grosso
