= Montes Claros Airport =

Montes Claros–Mário Ribeiro Airport Aeroporto de Montes Claros–Mário Ribeiro
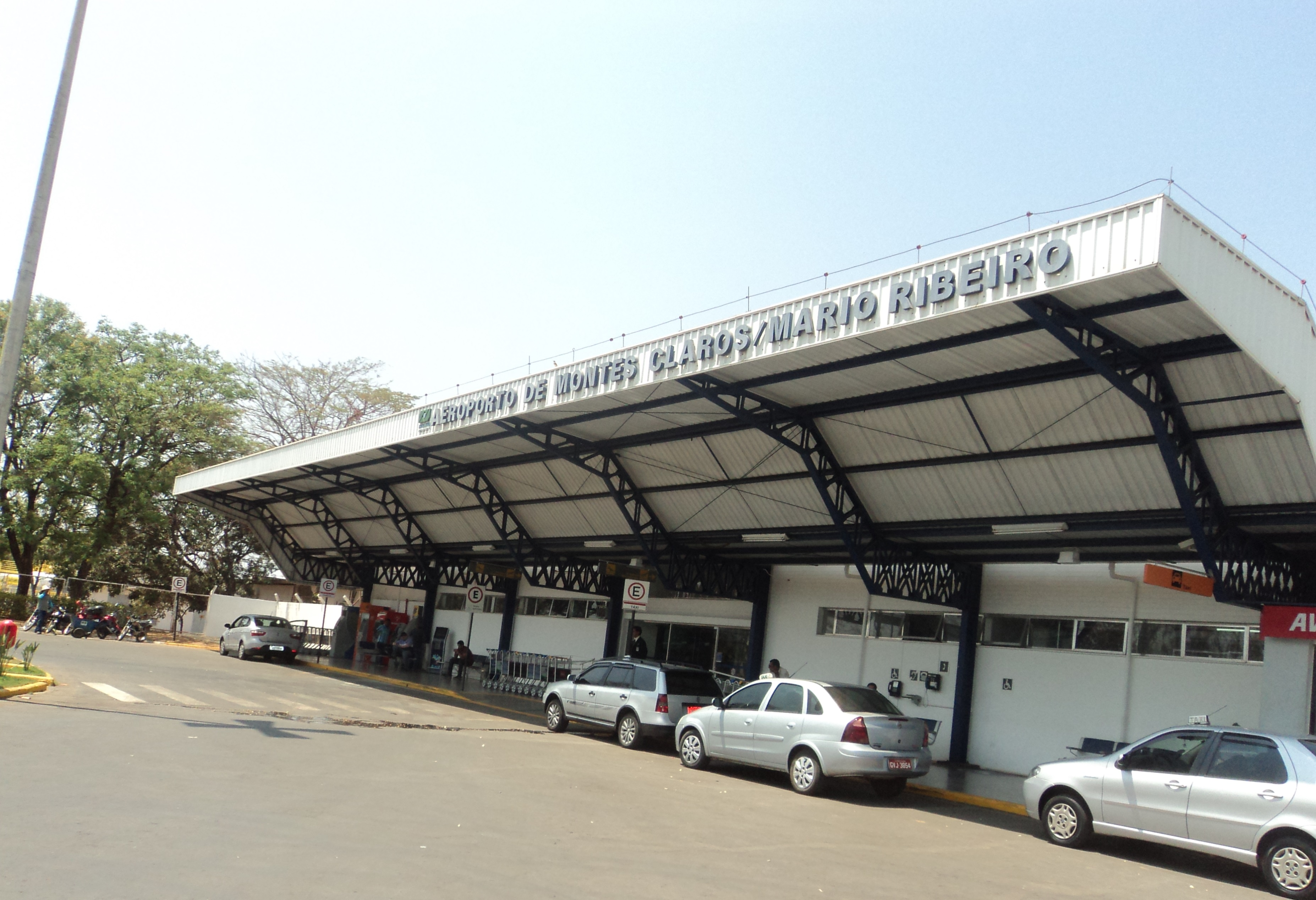
- IATA: MOC; ICAO: SBMK; LID: MG0004

Summary
- Airport type: Public
- Operator: Infraero (1980–2022); AENA (2022–present)
- Serves: Montes Claros
- Opened: 18 December 1939
- Time zone: BRT (UTC−03:00)
- Elevation AMSL: 668 m (2,192 ft)
- Coordinates: 16°42′22″S 043°49′19″W

Map
- Location in Brazil MOC (Brazil)

Runways
Direction	Length		Surface
Direction	m	ft	Surface
12/30	2,100	6,890	Asphalt

Statistics (2025)
- Passengers: 355,389
- Aircraft Operations: 10,903 ▲10%
- Metric tonnes of cargo: 282 ▲6%
- Statistics: AENA; Sources: ANAC, DECEA

Montes Claros–Mário Ribeiro Airport (IATA: MOC, ICAO: SBMK) is the airport serving the city of Montes Claros, Brazil. Since April 2, 2003, the airport is named after Mário Ribeiro (1924–1999), a local politician.

It is operated by AENA.

== History ==
The Montes Claros Airport was officially inaugurated on December 18, 1939. Panair do Brasil was the first airline to operate in the airport, with service to the cities of Belo Horizonte, Salvador, and Recife commencing in 1942. In 1948, Nacional Serviços Aéreos commenced regular operations with daily flights between Montes Claros and Belo Horizonte, using Douglas DC-3 aircraft with capacity for 24 passengers. In 1965, VARIG took over the routes previously operated by Panair, using AVRO aircraft with capacity for 40 passengers.

In 1974, VARIG began using the Boeing 737-200 jet aircraft for its Montes Claros routes, with a capacity for 109 passengers and over six tons of baggage and cargo. However, in 1977, due to the airport's inadequate infrastructure for the aircraft, operations were temporarily suspended. The runway was expanded to a length of 2,100 metres, allowing operations to the resume in 1978. In the same year, Nordeste Linhas Aéreas began operating routes between Montes Claros and Belo Horizonte, Salvador, Guanambi, and Vitória da Conquista.

On March 31, 1980, the Brazilian Ministry of Aeronautics transferred the operations of the airport to INFRAERO, which held jurisdiction in the airport until 2022.

In 2003, the airport was officially renamed to Aeroporto de Montes Claros - Mário Ribeiro, in honour of Mário Ribeiro, a local doctor and politician who served as councilman, vice-mayor, and mayor of the city between 1989 and 1992. A sculpture in his honour was erected in front of the airport terminal in 2021.

On October 31, 2004, VARIG operated its final flight at the airport.

In 2010, daily flights to Belo Horizonte International Airport began, whereas previously, most flights to Belo Horizonte landed on Pampulha Airport.

Starting in 2011, various renovations took place at the airport, including the installation of air conditioning in the passenger terminal, accessibility improvements, and the construction of a new parking lot.

In 2021, the airport underwent another major renovation, and its upgraded terminal now has a capacity to serve 1.5 million passengers annually, up from the previous capacity of 800,000 passengers per year.

Previously operated by Infraero, on August 18, 2022, the consortium AENA won a 30-year concession to operate the airport.

== Airlines and destinations ==
Airlines	Destinations
Azul Brazilian Airlines	Belo Horizonte–Confins
Gol Linhas Aéreas	São Paulo–Congonhas
LATAM Brasil	São Paulo–Guarulhos

== Access ==
The airport is located 7 km (4 mi) northeast of downtown Montes Claros.

== See also ==
- List of airports in Brazil
