= Juiz de Fora Airport =

Francisco Álvares de Assis Airport Aeroporto Francisco Álvares de Assis

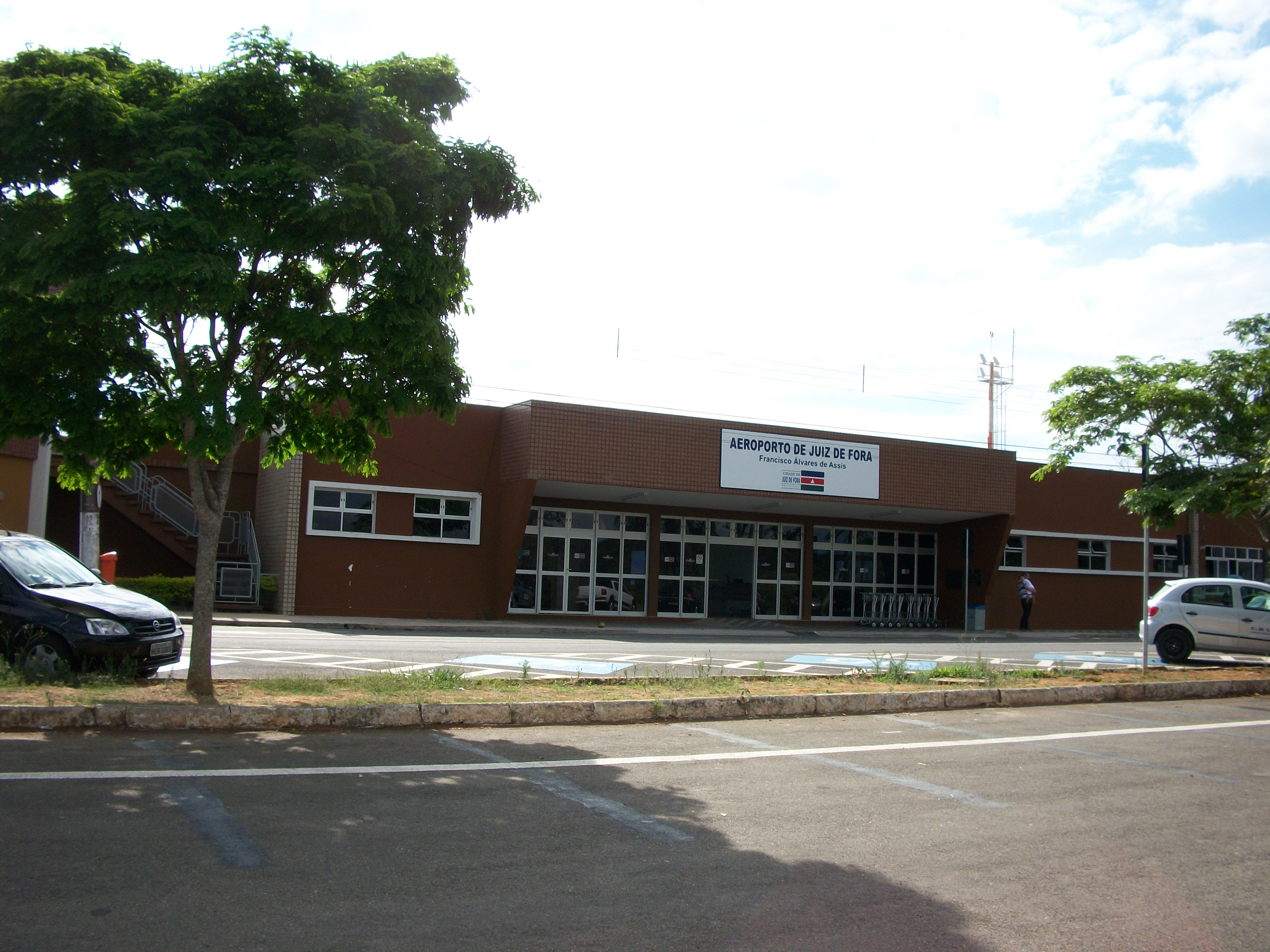
- Airport terminal landside in 2011
- IATA: JDF; ICAO: SBJF; LID: MG0016

Summary
- Airport type: Public
- Operator: Infraero (1996–2007); Sinart (2007–2022); Infraero (2022–present)
- Serves: Juiz de Fora
- Opened: 17 September 1958; 68 years ago
- Time zone: BRT (UTC−03:00)
- Elevation AMSL: 911 m (2,989 ft)
- Coordinates: 21°47′35″S 043°23′08″W
- Website: www4.infraero.gov.br/aeroporto-juiz-de-fora/

Map
- Location in Brazil JDF (Brazil)

Runways
Direction	Length		Surface
Direction	m	ft	Surface
03/21	1,535	5,036	Asphalt

Statistics (2025)
- Passengers: 16,850 ▲36%
- Aircraft Operations: 15,230 ▲144%
- Metric tonnes of cargo: 0
- Statistics: Infraero; Sources: Airport Website, ANAC, DECEA

Francisco Álvares de Assis Airport (IATA: JDF, ICAO: SBJF), also called Serrinha Airport, is an airport in Juiz de Fora, Brazil. Since December 29, 1952, the airport is named after the entrepreneur Francisco Álvares de Assis.

It is managed by contract by Infraero.

== History ==
The airport was officially commissioned on September 17, 1958.

The Flying club of Juiz de Fora is based at the airport.

On 2 April 2014 the airport ceased to receive regular commercial flights. These flights were transferred to the new and larger Pres. Itamar Franco Airport located 35 km (22 mi) from downtown Juiz de Fora.

== Accidents and incidents ==
- 28 July 2012: a Beechcraft B200 King Air belonging to Vilma Alimentos, registration PR-DOC, flying from Belo Horizonte–Pampulha was destroyed when it impacted trees, structures, and electrical power lines 245 meters prior to the landing threshold of runway 03. All 8 occupants perished.

== Access ==
The airport is located 8 km (5 mi) from the centre of Juiz de Fora.

== See also ==
- List of airports in Brazil
