= Infraero =

Brazilian state-owned airport operating company

Empresa Brasileira de Infraestrutura Aeroportuária
- Type: Government-owned company
- Industry: Aviation
- Founded: 31 May 1973; 53 years ago
- Headquarters: Brasília, Brazil
- Key people: Rogério Barzellay (CEO)
- Products: Airports administration
- Revenue: ▲US$ 2.0 billion (2012)
- Net income: ▼US$ 52.5 million (2012)
- Website: www.infraero.gov.br

Empresa Brasileira de Infraestrutura Aeroportuária (abr. Infraero) is a Brazilian government corporation founded in 1973, authorized by Law 5,862, that is responsible for operating the main Brazilian commercial airports. In 2011 Infraero's airports carried 179,482,228 passengers, 1,464,484 tons of cargo, and operated 2,893,631 take-offs and landings. Presently it manages 26 airports.

The company is present all over Brazil and employs approximately 23,000 employees and subcontracted workers nationwide. It is headquartered in the Infraero Building, in Brasília, Federal District.

== History ==
The company implements a workplan which covers practically all airports managed by it and which generates over 50 thousand jobs all over Brazil. The Brazilian airport infrastructure, which may match to the international standards, is being updated to meet the next years demand.

The works are performed with the company's own revenue, mainly generated by the air cargo storage and custom duty, granting of commercial areas in the airports, boarding, landing and stay tariffs, and rendering of communication and air navigation auxiliary services.

On 9 October 2009, it was announced that Infraero will invest in airports abroad: Infraero was invited by the Government of Paraguay to administer Silvio Pettirossi International Airport in Asunción and invited to participate in the privatization of Ruzyně Airport in Prague, Czech Republic, among other investments.

On March 4, 2010, the government of Brazil announced that it would adopt the model of concession to airports. For this reason Infraero would become a concessionary rather than an administrator of the airports that it currently operates. The main consequence is the fact that Infraero will be able to open its capital and obtain resources necessary for infra-structure investments. Another consequence is that municipal or state governments would have it easier to change concessionaries, such as the intention announced on 28 August 2009 by Rosinha Matheus, the Mayor of Campos dos Goytacazes, who requested Infraero the transfer of the administration of Bartolomeu Lysandro Airport to the Municipality. The Minister of Defense, to whom Infraero was subordinate (currently it belongs to Civil Aviation Secretary), announced being in favor of the transfer.

Responding to critiques to the situation of its airports, and in preparation to the several rounds of concession biddings, on May 18, 2011, Infraero released a list evaluating some of its most important airports according to its saturation levels.

== Investments related to the 2014 FIFA World Cup ==
On 31 August 2009 Infraero unveiled an ambitious BRL5.3 billion (US$2.8 billion; EUR2.0 billion) investment plan to upgrade airports of ten cities focusing mainly the preparations for the 2014 FIFA World Cup which was held in Brazil, and for the 2016 Summer Olympics, which was held in Rio de Janeiro. Of the twelve cities that held venues, ten received major investments. Natal – Augusto Severo International Airport and Salvador – Dep. Luís Eduardo Magalhães International Airport were excluded because their upgrade works were completed.

The investments were distributed as follows (in BRL million):

=== Ongoing works ===
Belo Horizonte

Pampulha/Carlos Drummond de Andrade Airport

New control tower. Value 5.6. Completion: originally November 2010; postponed to the end of 2012
Upgrade of general aviation hangars. Value 1.2. Completion: July 2013.
Enlargement of the apron. Value 1.6. Completion: July 2013.

Tancredo Neves International Airport (Confins)

Extension of runway, enlargement of apron and cargo terminal, construction of further taxiways. Value 120.0. Completion: July 2013.
Renovation of the passenger terminal. Value 215.5. Completion: March 2014.

Brasília – Presidente Juscelino Kubitschek International Airport

Enlargement of apron and taxiways. Value 34.5. Completion: April 2011.
Renovation of the existing passenger terminal. Value 22.5. Completion: November 2011.
Enlargement of the passenger terminal. Value 439.0. Completion: April 2013.
Parking. Value 18.8. Completion: April 2014

Campinas/São Paulo – Viracopos International Airport

Construction of the second runway. Value 314.0. Completion: April 2013.
Construction of phase 1 of a new passenger terminal. Value 2,500.0. Completion: May 2015.

Cuiabá – Marechal Rondon International Airport

Renovation of passenger terminal, parking and access to the airport. Value 30.9. Completion: October 2012.

Curitiba – Afonso Pena International Airport

Enlargement of the apron and implementation of taxiways. Value 30.0. Completion: March 2011.

Fortaleza – Pinto Martins International Airport

Renovation and enlargement of passenger terminal, apron, and parking. Value 525.0. Completion: November 2013.

Manaus – Eduardo Gomes International Airport

Enlargement of apron and existing runway. Construction of second runway. Value 600.0. Completion: July 2013.
Enlargement and renovation of the passenger terminal. Value 193.5. Completion: December 2013.

Porto Alegre – Salgado Filho International Airport

Extension of the runway. Value 122.0. Never completed.

Rio de Janeiro

Galeão/Antonio Carlos Jobim International Airport

Renovation of passenger terminal 1. Value 314.9. Completion: February 2011.
Completion and renovation of passenger terminal 2. Value 284.0. Completion: May 2012.
Construction of further parking. Value 220.0. Completion: May 2013.

Santos Dumont Airport

Completion of the renovation of the passenger arrivals terminal. Value 152.2. Completion: November 2011.

São Paulo

Congonhas Airport

Renovation of the apron. Value 20.6. Completion: January 2012.
Conclusion of the renovation on the south portion of the passenger terminal. Value 67.1. Completion: October 2012.
Renovation of the north portion of the passenger terminal. Value 65.1. Completion: October 2014.

Guarulhos/Governador André Franco Montoro International Airport

Construction of further taxiways. Value 19.0. Completion: April 2011 (work not yet completed in August 2011).
Enlargement of apron and taxiways. Value 370.5. Completion: July 2011 (work not yet completed in August 2011).
Construction of the passenger terminal 3. Value 1,100.0. Completion: March 2014.

=== Completed works ===
Belo Horizonte – Tancredo Neves International Airport (Confins)

Enlargement of Parking. Value 6.8. Completed on July 26, 2010

Recife – Guararapes/Gilberto Freyre International Airport

Conclusion of the passenger terminal renovation with installation of further 8 jetways. Value: 8.75. Completed on July 1, 2011

São Paulo – Congonhas Airport

New control tower. Value 11.9. Completed on May 8, 2013

== Concessions ==
On April 26, 2011, it was confirmed that in order to speed-up much needed renovation and up-grade works, private companies would be granted a concession to commercially exploit some Infraero airports in exchange for the implementation of those works. Listed airports included São Paulo/Guarulhos – Governador André Franco Montoro International Airport, Brasília – Presidente Juscelino Kubitschek International Airport, Campinas – Viracopos International Airport, and later Belo Horizonte – Tancredo Neves International Airport and Rio de Janeiro – Galeão/Antonio Carlos Jobim International Airport. The plan was confirmed on May 31, 2011, and it was added that Infraero would retain 49% of the shares of each privatized airport. However, starting in the fourth phase (2017), this obligation ceased to exist.

The concession program was divided into phases, each with its own public bidding.

=== First Phase ===
The first phase was related to Natal–Gov. Aluízio Alves International Airport. In 1998 Infraero started the planning and construction of the airport. In 2011 the concession of the unfinished facility was auctioned and the winner would have to finish its construction, including the terminal building and control tower. On August 22, 2011, the concession of the airport was won by the Consortium Inframérica, formed by the Brazilian Engineering Group Engevix (50%) and the Argentinean Group Corporación América (50%), which operates 52 airports in seven countries. The concession was for 25 years (with one possible five-year extension) and as part of the agreement Infraero held no shares participation.

=== Second Phase ===
The second phase was related to the auction that took place on February 6, 2012. The result was:

- Consortium Inframérica composed by the Brazilian Engineering Group Engevix (50%) and the Argentinean Group Corporación América (50%) won the concession of Brasília–Pres. Juscelino Kubitschek International Airport, which will be explored for a period of 25 years;
- Consortium Aeroportos Brasil composed by the Brazilian Investments and Funds Society Triunfo (45%), UTC Engineering and Investments Society (45%), and the French airport operator Egis Avia (10%) won the concession of Campinas–Viracopos International Airport, to be explored for 30 years;
- Consortium Invepar–ACSA, also known as GRU Airport, composed by the Brazilian Investments and Funds Society Invepar (90%) and the South African airport operator ACSA (10%) won the concession of São Paulo/Guarulhos–Gov. André Franco Montoro International Airport and was authorized to explore the facility for 20 years.

=== Third Phase ===
The third phase took place on November 22, 2013, when the Brazilian Government had a bidding process for:

- the operation of Belo Horizonte/Confins–Tancredo Neves International Airport with rights from 2014 until 2044. The group Aerobrasil, also known as BH Airport, formed by the Brazilian transportation company CCR (75%) and by the Swiss operator Flughafen Zürich AG (25%) won the bid;
- the operation of Rio de Janeiro/Galeão–Antonio Carlos Jobim International Airport from 2014 until 2039. It was won by the Group Aeroporto Rio de Janeiro, also known as RIOgaleão, formed by the Brazilian Conglomerate Odebrecht (60%) and the Singaporean operator Changi Airport Group (40%).

=== Fourth Phase ===
The fourth phase took place on March 16, 2017, and the result was:

- Fortaleza–Pinto Martins International Airport and Porto Alegre–Salgado Filho International Airport were won by the German airport operator Fraport. The concession for Porto Alegre is for 25 years and Fortaleza for 30 years;
- Florianópolis–Hercílio Luz International Airport was won by the Swiss airport operator Flughafen Zürich AG for 30 years;
- Salvador da Bahia–Dep. Luís Eduardo Magalhães International Airport was won by the French airport operator Vinci SA for 30 years.

=== Fifth Phase ===
The fifth phase, done in blocks valid for 30 years, took place on March 15, 2019, and the result was:

- Cuiabá–Mal. Rondon International Airport, Alta Floresta Airport, Rondonópolis Airport, and Sinop Airport, were won by the Consortium Aeroeste, formed by the Brazilian airport operators Socicam and Sinart. Alta Floresta, Rondonópolis, and Sinop were not previous Infraero facilities but were included in the auction;
- Recife/Guararapes–Gilberto Freyre International Airport, Aracaju–Santa Maria Airport, Campina Grande–Pres. João Suassuna Airport, João Pessoa–Pres. Castro Pinto International Airport, Juazeiro do Norte–Orlando Bezerra de Menezes Airport, and Maceió–Zumbi dos Palmares International Airport and were won by the Spanish airport operator AENA;
- Vitória–Eurico de Aguiar Salles Airport and Macaé–Benedito Lacerda Airport^{a} were won by the Swiss airport operator Flughafen Zürich AG.

Note:
^{a}: The name was changed to Macaé–Joaquim de Azevedo Mancebo Airport in 2022.

=== Sixth Phase ===
The sixth phase, done in blocks valid for 30 years, took place on April 7, 2021, and the result was:

- Curitiba–Afonso Pena International Airport, Bagé–Comte. Gustavo Kraemer International Airport, Curitiba–Bacacheri Airport, Foz do Iguaçu–Cataratas International Airport, Joinville–Lauro Carneiro de Loyola Airport, Londrina–Gov. José Richa Airport, Navegantes–Min. Victor Konder International Airport, Pelotas–João Simões Lopes Neto International Airport, and Uruguaiana–Ruben Berta International Airport were won by the Brazilian transportation company CCR;
- Goiânia–Santa Genoveva International Airport, Imperatriz–Pref. Renato Moreira Airport, Palmas–Brig. Lysias Rodrigues Airport, Petrolina–Sen. Nilo Coelho Airport, São Luís–Mal. Cunha Machado International Airport, and Teresina–Sen. Petrônio Portella Airport were won by the Brazilian transportation company CCR;
- Manaus–Brig. Eduardo Gomes International Airport, Boa Vista−Atlas Brasil Cantanhede International Airport, Cruzeiro do Sul International Airport, Porto Velho–Gov. Jorge Teixeira de Oliveira International Airport, Rio Branco–Plácido de Castro International Airport, Tabatinga International Airport, and Tefé–Pref. Orlando Marinho Airport and were won by the French airport operator Vinci SA.

=== Seventh Phase ===
The seventh phase, done in blocks valid for 30 years, took place on August 18, 2022, and the result was:

- Belém/Val-de-Cans International Airport and Macapá International Airport were won by the Brazilian consortium Novo Norte, formed by the Brazilian airport operators Socicam and Dix Aeroportos;
- Rio de Janeiro/Jacarepaguá–Roberto Marinho Airport and São Paulo–Campo de Marte Airport were won by the Brazilian investment company XP Inc.;
- São Paulo/Congonhas–Dep. Freitas Nobre Airport, Altamira Airport, Campo Grande International Airport, Carajás Airport, Corumbá International Airport, Marabá–João Correa da Rocha Airport, Montes Claros–Mário Ribeiro Airport, Ponta Porã International Airport, Santarém–Maestro Wilson Fonseca Airport, Uberaba–Mário de Almeida Franco Airport, Uberlândia–Ten. Cel. Av. César Bombonato Airport, were won by the Spanish operator AENA.

=== Independent cases ===
Before 2003 Castilho/Urubupungá–Ernesto Pochler Airport was transferred from Infraero to DAESP.

On October 11, 2013, the administration of Campos dos Goytacazes–Bartolomeu Lysandro Airport was transferred from Infraero to the Municipality of Campos dos Goytacazes.

On August 22, 2017, the concession of Ilhéus–Jorge Amado Airport was transferred from Infraero to the State of Bahia.

On June 17, 2020, the Federal Government signed and agreement to transfer the administration of Belo Horizonte/Pampulha–Carlos Drummond de Andrade Airport from Infraero to the State of Minas Gerais.

On November 17, 2020, the concession of Paulo Afonso Airport was transferred from Infraero to the State of Bahia.

On December 2, 2020, the Federal Government signed and agreement to transfer the administration of São José dos Campos–Prof. Urbano Ernesto Stumpf Airport to the Municipality of São José dos Campos.

=== Further developments ===
On July 17, 2020, the Federal Government authorized the beginning of a new concession process for Viracopos International Airport in Campinas upon request from the present concessionary Consortium Aeroportos Brasil.

In February 2022, it was announced that the National Civil Aviation Agency of Brazil would start a new concession process for Rio de Janeiro – Galeão/Antonio Carlos Jobim International Airport, at the request of the concessionary. The new biding process took place on March 30, 2026. The winner was AENA, becoming, thus the new concessionary of the facility. RioGaleão (formed by Infraero with 49% of the shares, and Changi Airport Group, and Vinci with 51% of the shares, the latter having replaced the original Brazilian investor Odebrecht) and AENA will jointly manage the facility until the re-concession process is completed. AENA holds 100% of the concession because Infraero ceased to hold 49% of the shares.

== List of airports managed by Infraero ==
=== As concessionary ===
City	Airport	Since	Reference
Anápolis	Anápolis Airport	27 November 2024	
Ariquemes	Ariquemes Airport	1 April 2024	
Canela/Gramado	Canela Airport	12 July 2024	
Caxias do Sul	Hugo Cantergiani Regional Airport	9 October 2026	
Divinópolis	Brigadeiro Cabral Airport	7 May 2024	
Governador Valadares	Cel. Altino Machado de Oliveira Airport	12 December 2023	
Ipatinga/Santana do Paraíso	Vale do Aço Regional Airport	7 August 2020	
Itaperuna	Ernani do Amaral Peixoto Airport	2 January 2024	
Luziânia	Luziânia Airport	27 November 2024	
Manaus	Flores Airport	27 November 2023	
Mossoró	Gov. Dix-Sept Rosado Airport	29 December 2022	
Paranavaí	Edu Chaves Airport	18 January 2024	
Rio de Janeiro	Santos Dumont Airport	27 February 1987	
Sorriso	Adolino Bedin Regional Airport	25 February 2022	
Torres	Torres Airport	12 July 2024	

=== As partner concessionary ===
The following airports are administrated in partnership with other concessionaries. Infraero retains 49% of the shares:

City	Airport	Since	Partner	Reference
Belo Horizonte	Confins–Tancredo Neves International Airport	2014	BH Airport	
Brasília	Pres. Juscelino Kubitschek International Airport	2012	Inframérica	
Campinas	Viracopos International Airport	2012	Aeroportos Brasil	
São Paulo	Guarulhos–Gov. André Franco Montoro International Airport	2012	GRU Airport	

=== By contract ===
The following airports are managed by Infraero by contract:

City	Airport	Since	Reference
Dourados	Francisco de Matos Pereira Airport	22 July 2024	
Guarujá/Santos	Guarujá Civil Metropolitan Aerodrome	3 July 2020	
Gurupi	Comte. Jacinto Nunes Airport	1 July 2023	
Juiz de Fora	Francisco Álvares de Assis Airport	13 June 2022	
Linhares	Linhares Regional Airport	24 August 2023	
Poços de Caldas	Emb. Walther Moreira Salles Airport	20 October 2022	
Salinópolis	Salinópolis Airport	1 March 2024	

== Previous Management ==
=== As concessionary ===
City	Airport	Period	Note	Reference
Altamira	Altamira Airport	1980-2022	Transferred to AENA on August 18, 2022	
Aracaju	Santa Maria Airport	1975-2019	Transferred to AENA on March 15, 2019	
Bagé	Comte. Gustavo Kraemer International Airport	1980-2021	Transferred to CCR on April 7, 2021	
Belém	Protásio de Oliveira Airport	1980-2021	Closed on December 31, 2021	
Belém	Val de Cans–Júlio Cezar Ribeiro International Airport	1974-2022	Transferred to Novo Norte on August 18, 2022	
Belo Horizonte	Carlos Prates Airport	1974-2023	Closed on March 31, 2023	
Belo Horizonte	Confins–Tancredo Neves International Airport	1984-2014	Transferred to BH Airport on November 22, 2013	
Belo Horizonte	Pampulha–Carlos Drummond de Andrade Airport	1974-2020	Transferred to the State of Minas Gerais on June 17, 2020	
Boa Vista	Atlas Brasil Cantanhede International Airport	1974-2021	Transferred to Vinci SA on April 7, 2021	
Brasília	Pres. Juscelino Kubitschek International Airport	1973-2012	Transferred to Inframerica on February 6, 2012	
Campina Grande	Pres. João Suassuna Airport	1980-2019	Transferred to AENA on March 15, 2019	
Campinas	Viracopos International Airport	1977-2012	Transferred to Aeroportos Brasil on February 6, 2012	
Campo Grande	Campo Grande International Airport	1975-2022	Transferred to AENA on August 18, 2022	
Campos dos Goytacazes	Bartolomeu Lysandro Airport	1986-2013	Transferred to the Municipality of Campos dos Goytacazes on October 11, 2013	
Carajás (Parauapebas)	Carajás Airport	1985-2022	Transferred to AENA on August 18, 2022	
Castilho	Urubupungá–Ernesto Pochler Airport	1984-2003?	Transferred to DAESP before 2003	
Corumbá	Corumbá International Airport	1975-2022	Transferred to AENA on August 18, 2022	
Cruzeiro do Sul	Cruzeiro do Sul International Airport	1980-2021	Transferred to Vinci SA on April 7, 2021	
Cuiabá	Mal. Rondon International Airport	1974-2019	Transferred to Aeroeste on March 15, 2019	
Curitiba	Afonso Pena International Airport	1974-2021	Transferred to CCR on April 7, 2021	
Curitiba	Bacacheri Airport	1980-2021	Transferred to CCR on April 7, 2021	
Florianópolis	Hercílio Luz International Airport	1974-2017	Transferred to Flughafen Zürich AG on March 16, 2017	
Fortaleza	Pinto Martins International Airport	1974-2017	Transferred to Fraport on March 16, 2017	
Foz do Iguaçu	Cataratas International Airport	1974-2021	Transferred to CCR on April 7, 2021	
Goiânia	Santa Genoveva International Airport	1974-2021	Transferred to CCR on April 7, 2021	
Ilhéus	Jorge Amado Airport	1981-2017	Transferred to the State of Bahia on August 22, 2017	
Imperatriz	Pref. Renato Moreira Airport	1980-2021	Transferred to CCR on April 7, 2021	
João Pessoa	Pres. Castro Pinto International Airport	1979-2019	Transferred to AENA on March 15, 2019	
Joinville	Lauro Carneiro de Loyola Airport	1974-2021	Transferred to CCR on April 7, 2021	
Juazeiro do Norte	Orlando Bezerra de Menezes Airport	2002-2019	Transferred to AENA on March 15, 2019	
Londrina	Gov. José Richa Airport	1980-2021	Transferred to CCR on April 7, 2021	
Macaé	Benedito Lacerda Airport	1986-2019	Transferred to Flughafen Zürich AG on March 15, 2019	
Macapá	Alberto Alcolumbre International Airport	1979-2022	Transferred to Novo Norte on August 18, 2022	
Maceió	Zumbi dos Palmares International Airport	1975-2019	Transferred to AENA on March 15, 2019	
Manaus	Brig. Eduardo Gomes International Airport	1976-2021	Transferred to Vinci SA on April 7, 2021	
Manaus	Ponta Pelada Airport	1973-1976	Transferred to the Brazilian Air Force on March 31, 1976	
Marabá	Marabá Airport	1980-2022	Transferred to AENA on August 18, 2022	
Montes Claros	Mário Ribeiro Airport	1980-2022	Transferred to AENA on August 18, 2022	
Natal	Augusto Severo International Airport	1980-2014	Transferred to the Brazilian Air Force on May 31, 2014	
Navegantes	Min. Victor Konder International Airport	1980-2021	Transferred to CCR on April 7, 2021	
Palmas	Old Palmas Airport	1997-2001	Closed on October 3, 2001	
Palmas	Brig. Lysias Rodrigues Airport	2001-2021	Transferred to CCR on April 7, 2021	
Paulo Afonso	Paulo Afonso Airport	1980-2020	Transferred to the State of Bahia on November 17, 2020	
Pelotas	João Simões Lopes Neto International Airport	1980-2021	Transferred to CCR on April 7, 2021	
Petrolina	Sen. Nilo Coelho Airport	1981-2021	Transferred to CCR on April 7, 2021	
Ponta Porã	Ponta Porã International Airport	1980-2022	Transferred to AENA on August 18, 2022	
Porto Alegre	Salgado Filho International Airport	1974-2017	Transferred to Fraport on March 16, 2017	
Porto Velho	Gov. Jorge Teixeira de Oliveira International Airport	1979-2021	Transferred to Vinci SA on April 7, 2021	
Recife	Guararapes–Gilberto Freyre International Airport	1974-2019	Transferred to AENA on March 15, 2019	
Rio Branco	Plácido de Castro International Airport	1999-2021	Transferred to Vinci SA on April 7, 2021	
Rio Branco	Pres. Médici International Airport	1979-1999	Closed on November 16, 1999	
Rio de Janeiro	Galeão–Antonio Carlos Jobim International Airport	1986-2013; 2013-2026	Transferred to RIOgaleão on November 22, 2013; On March 30, 2026 Infraero ceased to have 49% participation in the society	
Rio de Janeiro	Jacarepaguá–Roberto Marinho Airport	1986-2022	Transferred to Pax Aerportos on August 18, 2022	
Salvador da Bahia	Dep. Luís Eduardo Magalhães International Airport	1974-2017	Transferred to Vinci SA on March 16, 2017	
Santarém	Maestro Wilson Fonseca Airport	1980-2022	Transferred to AENA on August 18, 2022	
São José dos Campos	Prof. Urbano Ernesto Stumpf Airport	1996-2020	Transferred to the Municipality of São José dos Campos on December 2, 2020	
São Luís	Mal. Cunha Machado International Airport	1975-2021	Transferred to CCR on April 7, 2021	
São Paulo	Campo de Marte Airport	1979-2022	Transferred to Pax Aerportos on August 18, 2022	
São Paulo	Congonhas Airport	1977-2022	Transferred to AENA on August 18, 2022	
São Paulo	Guarulhos–Gov. André Franco Montoro International Airport	1985-2012	Transferred to GRU Airport on February 6, 2012	
Tabatinga	Tabatinga International Airport	1980-2021	Transferred to Vinci SA on April 7, 2021	
Tefé	Pref. Orlando Marinho Airport	1980-2021	Transferred to Vinci SA on April 7, 2021	
Teresina	Sen. Petrônio Portella Airport	1975-2021	Transferred to CCR on April 7, 2021	
Uberlândia	Ten. Cel. Av. César Bombonato Airport	1980-2022	Transferred to AENA on August 18, 2022	
Uberaba	Mário de Almeida Franco Airport	1980-2022	Transferred to AENA on August 18, 2022	
Uruguaiana	Ruben Berta International Airport	1980-2021	Transferred to CCR on April 7, 2021	
Vitória	Eurico de Aguiar Salles Airport	1975-2019	Transferred to Flughafen Zürich AG on March 15, 2019	

=== By contract ===
City	Airport	Period	Note	Reference
Aracati	Dragão do Mar Regional Airport	2023–2025	A new contract was signed with Dix	
Brasília	Planalto Central Aerodrome	2019–2022	A new contract was signed with Infracea	
Camocim	Camocim Airport	2023–2025	A new contract was signed with Visac	
Campos Sales	Campos Sales Airport	2023–2025	A new contract was signed with Visac	
Correia Pinto	Planalto Serrano Regional Airport	2018–2020	A new contract was signed with Infracea	
Crateús	Dr. Lúcio Lima Airport	2023–2025	A new contract was signed with Visac	
Criciúma / Forquilhinha	Diomício Freitas Airport	2006–2016	A new contract was signed with RDL Aeroportos	
Divinópolis	Brigadeiro Cabral Airport	2019–2024	Infraero became the concessionary	
Iguatu	Dr. Francisco Tomé da Frota Airport	2023–2025	A new contract was signed with Visac	
Jijoca de Jericoacoara	Comte. Ariston Pessoa Regional Airport	2023–2025	A new contract was signed with Dix	
Parnaíba	Pref. Dr. João Silva Filho International Airport	2004–2021	A new contract was signed with SBPB	
Passo Fundo	Lauro Kurtz Airport	2022–2025	New concessionary ON8	
Paulo Afonso	Paulo Afonso Airport	2022–2025	New concessionary GRU Airport	
Quixadá	Quixadá Airport	2023–2025	A new contract was signed with Visac	
Santo Ângelo	Sepé Tiaraju Airport	2022–2025	New concessionary ON8	
São Benedito	Walfrido Salmito de Almeida Airport	2023–2025	A new contract was signed with Visac	
Sobral	Luciano de Arruda Coelho Airport	2023–2025	A new contract was signed with Visac	
Tauá	Pedro Teixeira Castelo Airport	2023–2025	A new contract was signed with Visac	

== See also ==
- List of airports in Brazil
- List of the busiest airports in Brazil
