= Carlos Prates Airport =

Airport in Brazil

Carlos Prates Airport Aeroporto Carlos Prates
- IATA: none; ICAO: SBPR

Summary
- Airport type: Defunct
- Operator: Infraero (1974–2023)
- Serves: Belo Horizonte
- Closed: 31 March 2023; 3 years ago
- Time zone: BRT (UTC−03:00)
- Elevation AMSL: 928 m / 3,044 ft
- Coordinates: 19°54′33″S 043°59′21″W
- Website: www4.infraero.gov.br/aeroportos/aeroporto-de-belo-horizonte-carlos-prates/

Map
- Location in Brazil

Runways
Direction	Length		Surface
Direction	m	ft	Surface
~~09/27~~	~~868~~	~~2,848~~	~~Asphalt~~ (closed)

Statistics (2022)
- Passengers: 7,684 ▼59%
- Aircraft Operations: 15,449 ▼9%
- Metric tonnes of cargo: 0
- Statistics: Infraero; Sources: Airport Website, ANAC

Carlos Prates Airport (ICAO: SBPR) was one of the airports serving Belo Horizonte, Brazil. It was named after the neighborhood where it is located and this, in turn, was named after an Engineer that planned parts of Belo Horizonte. It was operated by Infraero.

== History ==
The airport was commissioned in 1944 and it has always been dedicated to general aviation and flying schools. Since 1973 it was managed by Infraero.

The airport ceased all operations permanently on March 31, 2023 after several delays. Some of its operations were transferred to Carlos Drummond de Andrade Airport. At the time of its closure no scheduled flights operated at this airport.

== Access ==
The airport is located 6 km (4 mi) from downtown Belo Horizonte.

== See also ==
- List of airports in Brazil
