= Comandante Gustavo Kraemer Airport =

Airport in Brazil

Comandante Gustavo Kraemer International Airport Aeroporto Internacional Comandante Gustavo Kraemer

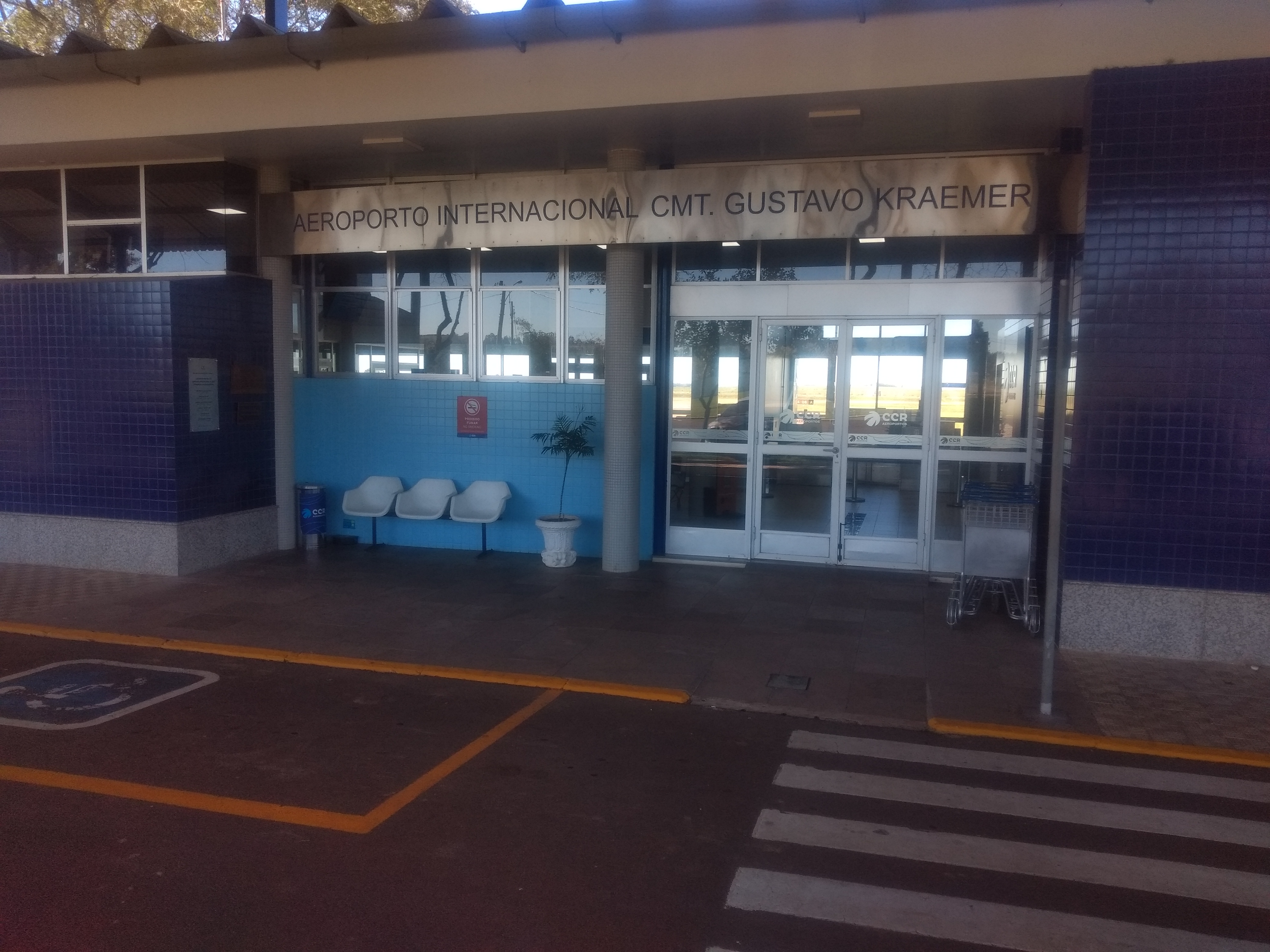
- IATA: BGX; ICAO: SBBG; LID: RS0010

Summary
- Airport type: Public
- Operator: Infraero (1980–2021); Motiva (2021–2026); ASUR (2026–present)
- Serves: Bagé
- Opened: July 5, 1946
- Time zone: BRT (UTC−03:00)
- Elevation AMSL: 186 m (610 ft)
- Coordinates: 31°23′27″S 054°06′35″W
- Website: aeroportos.motiva.com.br/bage-rs/

Map
- Location in Brazil BGX (Brazil)

Runways
Direction	Length		Surface
Direction	m	ft	Surface
06/24	1,500	4,921	Concrete

Statistics (2025)
- Passengers: 0^{a}
- Aircraft Operations: 456 ▼12%
- Statistics: Motiva; Sources: Airport Website, ANAC, DECEA, Note:^{a} as of 21 February 2026, no passenger data related to 2025 had been published.

Comandante Gustavo Kraemer International Airport (IATA: BGX, ICAO: SBBG) is the airport serving Bagé, Brazil. Since February 8, 1952, it is named after Captain Gustavo Ernesto de Carvalho Kraemer (1911–1950), founder and pilot of the airline SAVAG, killed on an air-crash in 1950.

It is operated by ASUR.

== History ==
The airport opened on July 5, 1946. On February 8, 1952, the airport was renamed after Gustavo Kraemer, who on June 20, 1950, died on an air-crash while piloting an aircraft of SAVAG, an airline of which he was also president.

Previously operated by Infraero, on April 7, 2021 CCR won a 30-year concession to operate the airport. On April 26, 2025 CCR was rebranded as Motiva.

On November 18, 2025 the entire airports portfolio of Motiva was sold to the Mexican airport operator ASUR. Motiva will cease to operate airports. The transaction was completed on August 31, 2026.

== Accidents and incidents ==
- 7 April 1957: a Varig Curtiss C-46A-45-CU Commando registration PP-VCF operating a flight from Bagé to Porto Alegre crashed during take-off from Bagé following a fire developed in the left main gear wheel well and consequent technical difficulties. All 40 passenger and crew died.

== Access ==
The airport is located 7 km (4 mi) from downtown Bagé.

== See also ==
- List of airports in Brazil
