= Bartolomeu Lysandro Airport =

Campos–Bartolomeu Lysandro Airport Aeroporto de Campos–Bartolomeu Lysandro
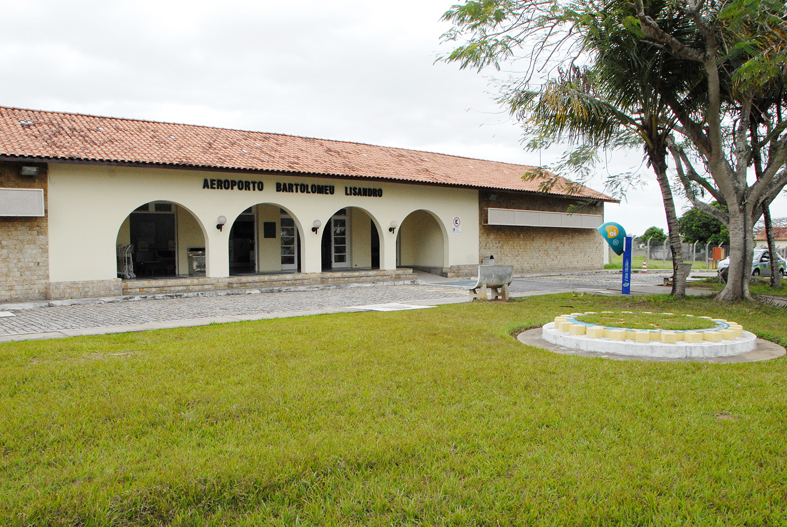
- IATA: CAW; ICAO: SBCP; LID: RJ0006

Summary
- Airport type: Public
- Operator: ARSA (1980–1987); Infraero (1987–2013); Campos dos Goytacazes (2013–2019); Infra Construtora e Serviços (2019–present)
- Serves: Campos dos Goytacazes
- Opened: October 19, 1952
- Time zone: BRT (UTC−03:00)
- Elevation AMSL: 17 m (56 ft)
- Coordinates: 21°42′04″S 041°18′28″W
- Website: bartolomeulisandro.com.br

Map
- Location in Brazil CAW (Brazil)

Runways
Direction	Length		Surface
Direction	m	ft	Surface
07/25	1,544	5,066	Asphalt

Statistics (2017)
- Passengers: 97,382 ▼50%
- Aircraft Operations: 10,396 ▼46%
- Metric tonnes of cargo: 1 ▼93%
- Statistics: Infraero; Sources: ANAC, DECEA

Campos–Bartolomeu Lysandro Airport (IATA: CAW, ICAO: SBCP) is the airport serving Campos dos Goytacazes, Brazil. Since December 24, 1960 it has been named after Congressman Bartholomeu Lysandro de Albernaz (1899–1965), a local plantation owner on whose land, the Fazenda Bonsucesso, the airport was built.

It is operated by Infra Construtora e Serviços.

== History ==
It was opened on October 19, 1952.

The airport has a total area of 949,114.04 m^{2} and its passenger terminal has an area of 459 m^{2}. The apron is capable of holding up to 6 aircraft.

On October 11, 2013, the administration of the airport was transferred from Infraero to the municipality of Campos dos Goytacazes, and on January 18, 2019, Infra Construtora e Serviços won from the Municipality a 30-year concession to operate the facility.

== Access ==
The airport is located 7 km (4 mi) from downtown Campos dos Goytacazes.

== See also ==
- List of airports in Brazil
