= Dourados Airport =

Francisco de Matos Pereira Airport Aeroporto Francisco de Matos Pereira

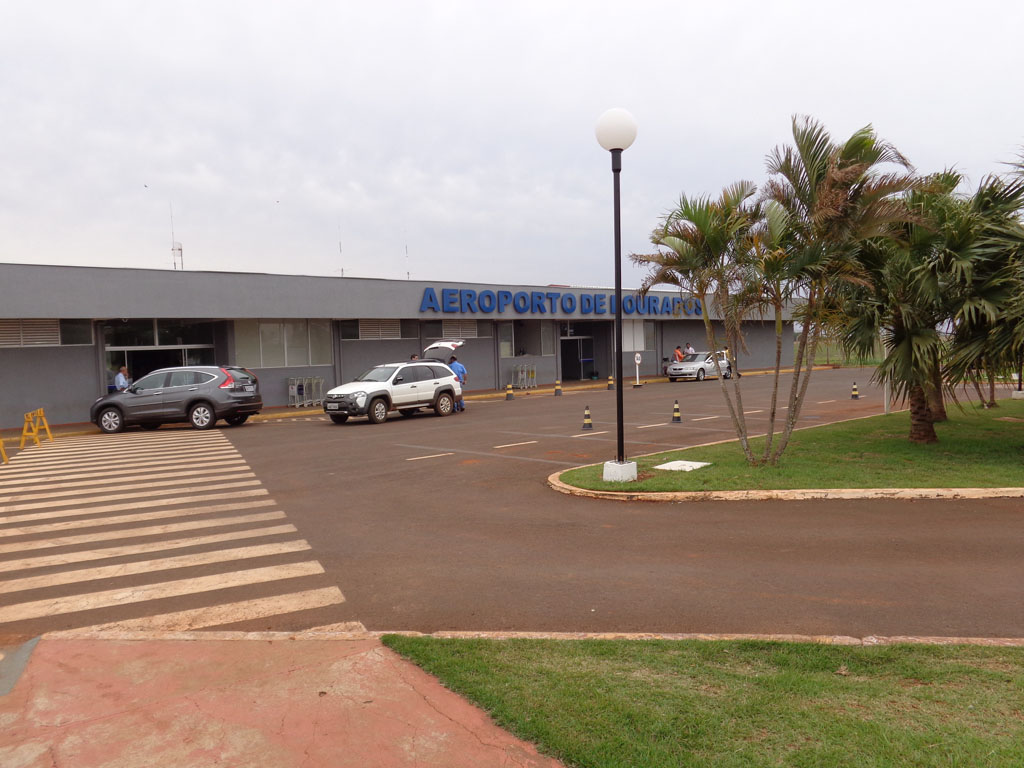
- IATA: DOU; ICAO: SBDO; LID: MS0008

Summary
- Airport type: Public
- Operator: Infraero (2024–present)
- Serves: Dourados
- Opened: November 13, 1982
- Time zone: BRT−1 (UTC−04:00)
- Elevation AMSL: 458 m / 1,503 ft
- Coordinates: 22°12′02″S 054°55′32″W
- Website: www4.infraero.gov.br/aeroporto-dourados/

Map
- Location in Brazil

Runways
Direction	Length		Surface
Direction	m	ft	Surface
06/24	1,950	6,398	Asphalt

Statistics (2025)
- Passengers: 12,747
- Aircraft Operations: 5,249
- Metric tonnes of cargo: 0
- Statistics: Infraero; Sources: Airport Website, ANAC, DECEA

Francisco de Matos Pereira Airport (IATA: DOU, ICAO: SBDO), formerly SSDO is the airport serving Dourados, Brazil.

It is managed by contract by Infraero.

== History ==
The airport was commissioned on November 13, 1982.

On July 22, 2024, the Mayor of Dourados signed a contract of operation with Infraero. Previously the airport was operated by the municipality.

== Airlines and destinations ==
Airlines	Destinations
LATAM Brasil	São Paulo–Guarulhos

== Access ==
The airport is located 14 km (9 mi) from downtown Dourados.

== See also ==
- List of airports in Brazil
