= Carajás Airport =

Airport in Pará, Brazil

Carajás Airport Aeroporto de Carajás
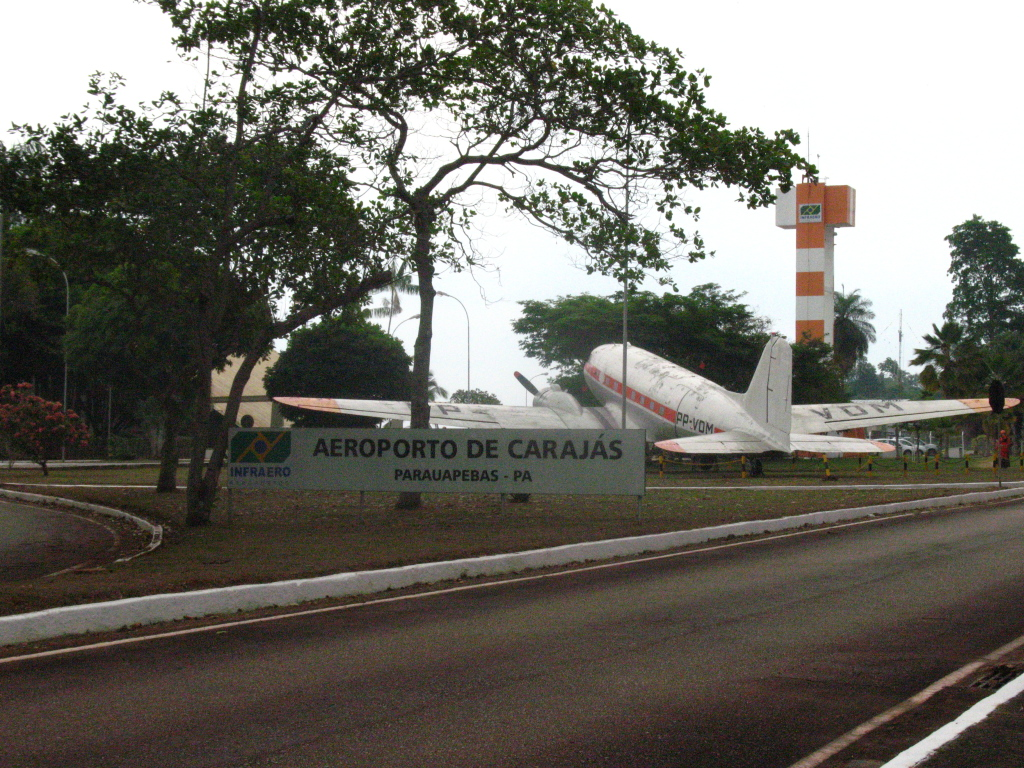
- IATA: CKS; ICAO: SBCJ; LID: PA0006

Summary
- Airport type: Public
- Operator: Infraero (1985–2022); AENA (2022–present)
- Serves: Carajás (Parauapebas)
- Opened: September 23, 1982; 43 years ago
- Time zone: BRT (UTC−03:00)
- Elevation AMSL: 629 m (2,064 ft)
- Coordinates: 06°07′04″S 050°00′12″W

Map
- Location in Brazil CKS (Brazil)

Runways
Direction	Length		Surface
Direction	m	ft	Surface
10/28	2,000	6,562	Asphalt

Statistics (2025)
- Passengers: 254,400 ▲17%
- Aircraft Operations: 4,818 ▼8%
- Metric tonnes of cargo: 406 ▼37%
- Statistics: AENA; Sources: ANAC, DECEA

Carajás Airport (IATA: CKS, ICAO: SBCJ) is the airport serving Parauapebas, Brazil, located in the Carajás Mining Complex.

It is operated by AENA.

== History ==
The airport was built by Companhia Vale do Rio Doce as a support the mining activities of Carajás Mine. It was commissioned on September 23, 1982. Between 1985 and 2022 it is operated by Infraero.

Previously operated by Infraero, on August 18, 2022, the consortium AENA won a 30-year concession to operate the airport.

== Airlines and destinations ==
Airlines	Destinations
Azul Brazilian Airlines	Belém, Belo Horizonte–Confins
Azul Conecta	Belém, Ourilândia do Norte
Gol Linhas Aéreas	Belo Horizonte–Confins

== Accidents and incidents ==
- 8 September 1987: a Brazilian Air Force Hawker Siddeley HS.125 registration FAB-2129 crashed upon take-off from Carajás. All nine occupants died.
- 14 February 1997: a Varig Boeing 737-241 registration PP-CJO operating flight 265, flying from Marabá to Carajás while on touch-down procedures at Carajás during a thunderstorm, had its right main gear collapsed rearwards causing the aircraft to veer off the right of the runway. The aircraft crashed into the forest. One crew member died.

== Access ==
The airport is located 18 km (11 mi) from downtown Parauapebas.

== See also ==
- List of airports in Brazil
