= Planalto Central Aerodrome =

Planalto Central Aerodrome Aeródromo do Planalto Central
- IATA: none; ICAO: SIQE; LID: DF0005

Summary
- Airport type: Private
- Owner: Terracap
- Operator: Infraero (2019–2022); Infracea (2022–present)
- Serves: Brasília
- Location: São Sebastião, Federal District, Brazil
- Time zone: BRT (UTC−03:00)
- Elevation AMSL: 1,025 m / 3,363 ft
- Coordinates: 15°56′14″S 047°43′38″W
- Website: www.infracea.com.br

Map
- Location in the Federal District

Runways
Direction	Length		Surface
Direction	m	ft	Surface
14/32	1,499	4,918	Asphalt
- Sources: Airport Website, ANAC, DECEA

Planalto Central Aerodrome (ICAO: SIQE) is an airport located in the administrative region of São Sebastião, in the Federal District, dedicated to general aviation.

It is managed by contract by Infracea.

== History ==
Previously known as Botelho Aerodrome, between September 11, 2019 and September 7, 2022 it was managed by contract by Infraero on behalf of the owner of the land, Terracap. On that day Infracea became the new contractor.

== Airlines and destinations ==
No scheduled flights operate at this airport.

== Access ==
The airport is located 35 km (22 mi) from downtown Brasília.

== See also ==
- List of airports in Brazil
