= Anápolis Airport =

Anápolis Airport Aeroporto de Anápolis
- IATA: APS; ICAO: SWNS; LID: GO0004

Summary
- Airport type: Public
- Operator: Infraero (2024–present)
- Serves: Anápolis
- Time zone: BRT (UTC−03:00)
- Elevation AMSL: 1,112 m (3,648 ft)
- Coordinates: 16°21′45″S 048°55′41″W
- Website: www4.infraero.gov.br/anapolis-go/

Map
- Location in Brazil

Runways
Direction	Length		Surface
Direction	m	ft	Surface
07/25	1,218	3,996	Asphalt

Statistics (2025)
- Passengers: 21,861
- Aircraft Operations: 13,785
- Metric tonnes of cargo: 0
- Statistics: Infraero; Sources: Airport Website, ANAC, DECEA

Anápolis Airport (IATA: APS, ICAO: SWNS), is the airport serving Anápolis, Brazil.

It is operated by Infraero.

== History ==
On November 27, 2024, the airport started being operated by Infraero.

== Access ==
The airport is located 5 km (3 mi) from downtown Anápolis.

== See also ==
- List of airports in Brazil
