= Flores Airport (Brazil) =

Airport serving Manaus, Brazil

Flores Airport Aeroporto de Flores

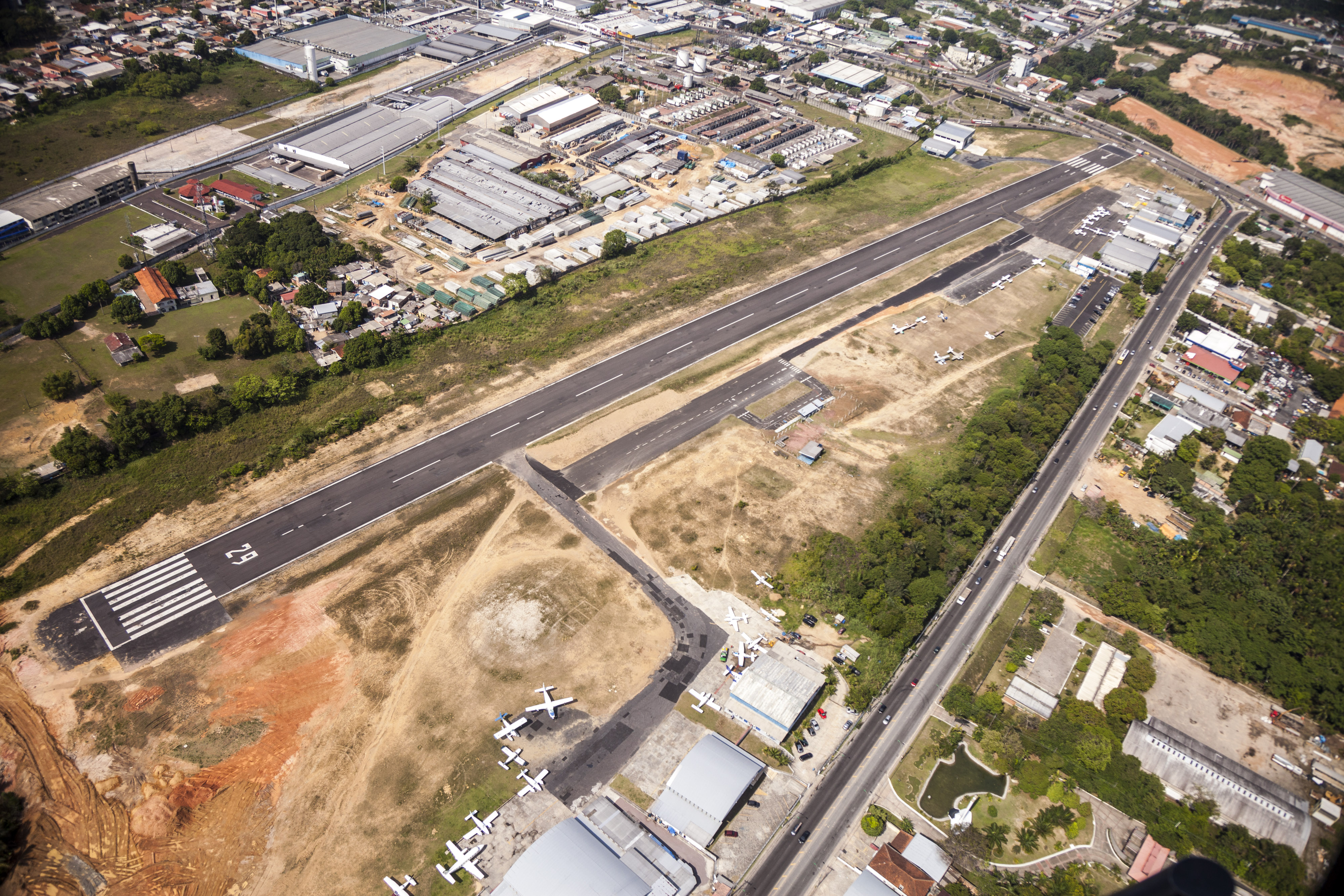
- Aerial view in 2013
- IATA: none; ICAO: SWFN; LID: AM0002

Summary
- Airport type: Public
- Operator: Infraero (2023–present)
- Serves: Manaus
- Opened: 30 April 1940; 86 years ago
- Time zone: BRT (UTC−04:00)
- Elevation AMSL: 62 m (203 ft)
- Coordinates: 03°04′22″S 060°01′16″W
- Website: www4.infraero.gov.br/aerodromo-de-flores/

Map
- Location in Brazil

Runways
Direction	Length		Surface
Direction	m	ft	Surface
11/29	799	2,621	Asphalt

Statistics (2025)
- Passengers: 211 ▼55%
- Aircraft operations: 17,346 ▲12%
- Metric tonnes of cargo: 0
- Statistics: Infraero; Sources: Airport Website, ANAC, DECEA

Flores Airport (ICAO: SWFN), is an airport serving Manaus, Brazil.

It is operated by Infraero.

== History ==
The airport is used by the Amazonas Flying Club, maintenance facilities and general aviation.

On November 27, 2023, Infraero became the concessionary of the airport.

== Accidents and incidents ==
- 28 February 2012: a Cessna 208B Grand Caravan belonging to Cleiton Táxi Aéreo, registration PT-PTB, took off from runway 29 on a ferry flight to Manaus–Eduardo Gomes International Airport. It failed to gain enough height on takeoff and collided with a pole. The airplane came down in a wooded area just off Avenida Torquato Tapajós. The pilot, the sole occupant, sustained fatal injuries.

== Access ==
The airport is located 6 km (4 mi) from downtown Manaus.

== See also ==
- List of airports in Brazil
