= Ponta Porã International Airport =

Ponta Porã International Airport Aeroporto Internacional de Ponta Porã
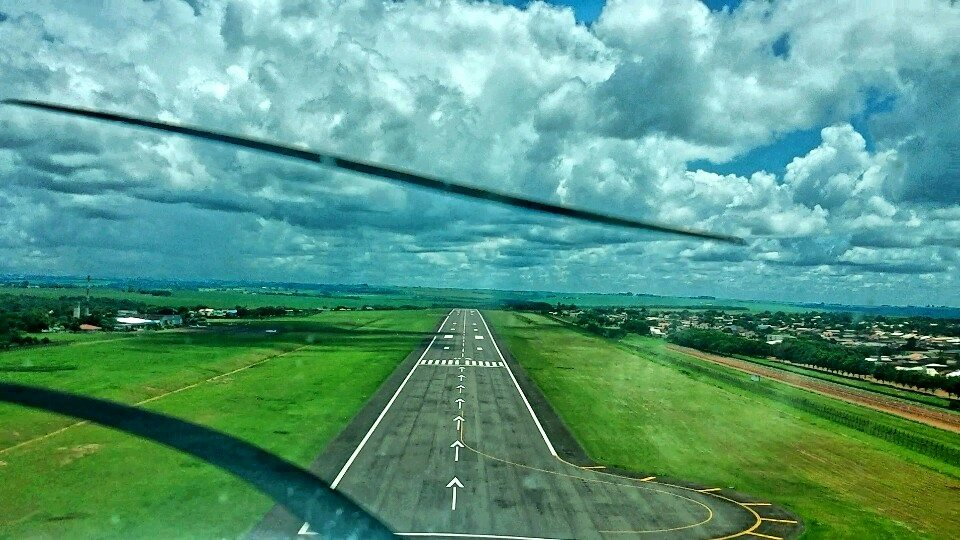
- IATA: PMG; ICAO: SBPP; LID: MS0005

Summary
- Airport type: Public
- Operator: Infraero (1980–2022); AENA (2022–present)
- Serves: Ponta Porã
- Opened: 11 March 1955
- Time zone: BRT−1 (UTC−04:00)
- Elevation AMSL: 657 m (2,156 ft)
- Coordinates: 22°32′59″S 055°42′11″W

Map
- Location in Brazil

Runways
Direction	Length		Surface
Direction	m	ft	Surface
04/22	2,000	6,562	Asphalt

Statistics (2025)
- Passengers: 29,301 ▼27%
- Aircraft Operations: 2,107 ▼25%
- Metric tonnes of cargo: 42 ▼16%
- Statistics: AENA; Sources: ANAC, DECEA

Ponta Porã International Airport (IATA: PMG, ICAO: SBPP) is the airport serving Ponta Porã, Brazil.

It is operated by AENA.

== History ==
The airport was commissioned on March 11, 1955.

Previously operated by Infraero, on August 18, 2022, the consortium AENA won a 30-year concession to operate the airport.

== Airlines and destinations ==
Airlines	Destinations
Azul Brazilian Airlines	Campinas

== Access ==
The airport is located 4 km (2 mi) from downtown Ponta Porã.

== See also ==
- List of airports in Brazil
