= Petrolina Airport =

Petrolina–Senador Nilo Coelho International Airport Aeroporto Internacional de Petrolina–Senador Nilo Coelho
- IATA: PNZ; ICAO: SBPL; LID: PE0002

Summary
- Airport type: Public
- Operator: Infraero (1981–2021); Motiva (2021–2026); ASUR (2026–present)
- Serves: Petrolina / Juazeiro
- Opened: 28 October 1981
- Time zone: BRT (UTC−03:00)
- Elevation AMSL: 386 m (1,266 ft)
- Coordinates: 09°22′03″S 040°33′49″W
- Website: aeroportos.motiva.com.br/petrolina-pe/

Map
- Location in Brazil

Runways
| Direction | Length | | Surface |
| Direction | m | ft | Surface |
|---|---|---|---|
| 13/31 | 3,250 | 10,663 | Asphalt |

Statistics (2025)
- Passengers: 480,038
- Aircraft Operations: 5,967 ▼3%
- Statistics: Motiva; Sources: Airport Website, ANAC, DECEA

Petrolina–Senador Nilo Coelho International Airport (IATA: PNZ, ICAO: SBPL) is the airport serving Petrolina, Pernambuco and Juazeiro, Bahia, Brazil. Since July 8, 2002 it is named after the Petrolina-born Senator Nilo de Sousa Coelho (1920–1983).

It is operated by ASUR.

== History ==
Petrolina Airport handles the export of fresh fruits from the São Francisco valley to Europe and the United States. The cargo terminal operates with 6 large coolers with capacity for 17,000 boxes each plus 2 cooler tunnels. Cargolux flies cargo configurated-Boeing 747 aircraft into the airport.

Previously operated by Infraero, on April 7, 2021 CCR won a 30-year concession to operate the airport. On April 26, 2025 CCR was rebranded as Motiva.

On November 18, 2025 the entire airports portfolio of Motiva was sold to the Mexican airport operator ASUR. Motiva will cease to operate airports. The transaction was completed on August 31, 2026.

== Airlines and destinations ==
| Airlines | Destinations |
|---|---|
| Azul Brazilian Airlines | Campinas, Recife |
| Gol Linhas Aéreas | Salvador da Bahia (ends 29 January 2027), São Paulo–Guarulhos |
| LATAM Brasil | Recife, São Paulo–Guarulhos |

== Access ==
The airport is located 9 km (6 mi) from downtown Petrolina and 15 km (9 mi) from downtown Juazeiro. The main access is made by the BR-235 roadway west of downtown Petrolina.

== See also ==
- List of airports in Brazil
