= Protásio de Oliveira Airport =

Brigadeiro Protásio de Oliveira Airport Aeroporto Brigadeiro Protásio de Oliveira
- IATA: none; ICAO: SBJC

Summary
- Airport type: Defunct
- Operator: Infraero (1980–2021)
- Serves: Belém
- Closed: 31 December 2021; 4 years ago
- Time zone: Time in Brazil (UTC−03:00)
- Elevation AMSL: 16 m / 52 ft
- Coordinates: 01°24′54″S 048°27′32″W

Map
- Location in Brazil SBJC (Brazil)

Runways
Direction	Length		Surface
Direction	m	ft	Surface
~~16/34~~	~~1,106~~	~~3,629~~	~~Asphalt~~ (closed)

Statistics (2021)
- Passengers: 10,847 ▲48%
- Aircraft Operations: 6,202 ▼52%
- Metric tonnes of cargo: 7 ▼56%
- Statistics: Infraero; Source: ANAC

Brigadeiro Protásio de Oliveira Airport (ICAO: SBJC), formerly called Júlio César Airport, was an airport, operated by Infraero, located 18 km (11 mi) from downtown, serving Belém, Brazil. Since 14 April 2010, it was named after Protásio Lopes de Oliveira (1923–2003) former president of Infraero and commander of the 1st Regional Air Force (I COMAR).

== History ==
The airport was opened in 1936 as a military airfield. In 1937 the Flying School of Pará also established itself on the premises. The airport remained dedicated to military and instruction operations until 1976, when it was converted for public use with the name of Júlio César Airport, after the neighborhood where it is located.

In 1980 administration was transferred to Infraero and it was dedicated to general aviation.

On 4 March 2021 plans to close the airport were announced. The site was converted into a park and its general aviation operations were transferred to Val-de-Cans International Airport. The airport was closed on 31 December 2021. At the time of its closure no scheduled flights operated at this airport.

It served to host the 2025 United Nations Climate Change Conference.
