= Ruben Berta International Airport =

Airport serving Uruguaiana, Brazil

Uruguaiana–Ruben Berta International Airport Aeroporto International de Uruguaiana–Ruben Berta

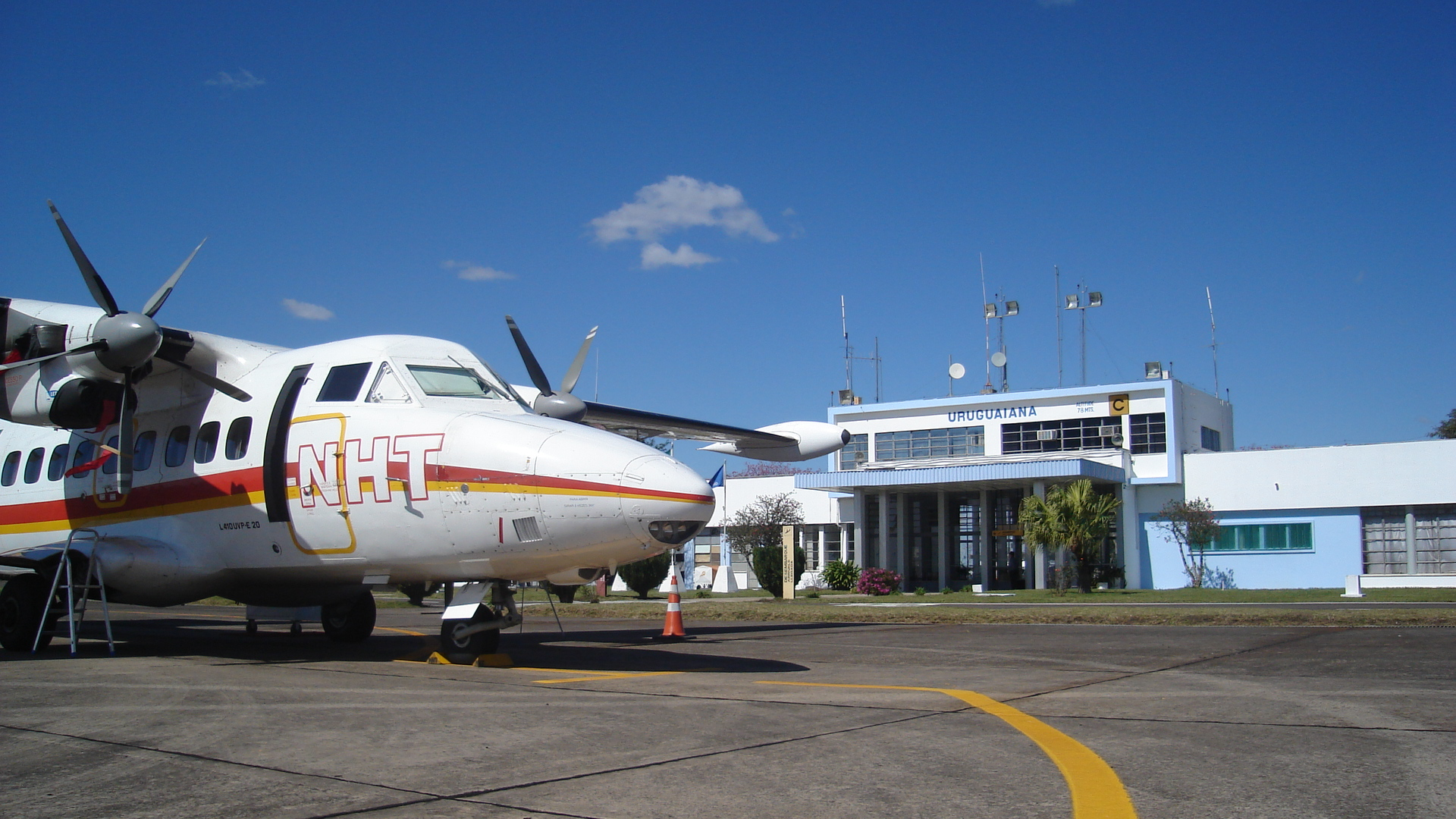
- A NHT Linhas Aéreas aircraft at Uruguaiana
- IATA: URG; ICAO: SBUG; LID: RS0012

Summary
- Airport type: Public
- Operator: Infraero (1980–2021); Motiva (2021–2026); ASUR (2026–present)
- Serves: Uruguaiana
- Time zone: BRT (UTC−03:00)
- Elevation AMSL: 78 m (256 ft)
- Coordinates: 29°47′00″S 057°02′13″W
- Website: aeroportos.motiva.com.br/uruguaiana-rs/

Map
- Location in Brazil URG (Brazil)

Runways
Direction	Length		Surface
Direction	m	ft	Surface
10/28	1,304	4,278	Asphalt

Statistics (2025)
- Passengers: 18,974 ▼29%
- Aircraft Operations: 816 ▲1%
- Statistics: Motiva; Sources: Airport Website, ANAC, DECEA

Uruguaiana–Ruben Berta International Airport (IATA: URG, ICAO: SBUG) is the airport serving Uruguaiana, Brazil. Since September 29, 1967 it is named after Ruben Berta (1907–1966), third Manager-Director of Varig. Even though Ruben Berta was spelled as Ruben the airport's official name is spelled Rubem.

It is operated by ASUR.

== History ==
The airport was commissioned in 1945 and the terminal building in 1968. On September 29, 1967, the airport was renamed after Ruben Berta.

Previously operated by Infraero, on April 7, 2021 CCR won a 30-year concession to operate the airport. On April 26, 2025 CCR was rebranded as Motiva.

On November 18, 2025 the entire airports portfolio of Motiva was sold to the Mexican airport operator ASUR. Motiva will cease to operate airports. The transaction was completed on August 31, 2026.

== Airlines and destinations ==
Airlines	Destinations
Azul Brazilian Airlines	Porto Alegre

== Access ==
The airport is located 9 km (6 mi) from downtown Uruguaiana.

== See also ==
- List of airports in Brazil
