= Paulo Afonso Airport =

Airport serving Paulo Afonso, Brazil

Paulo Afonso Airport Aeroporto de Paulo Afonso

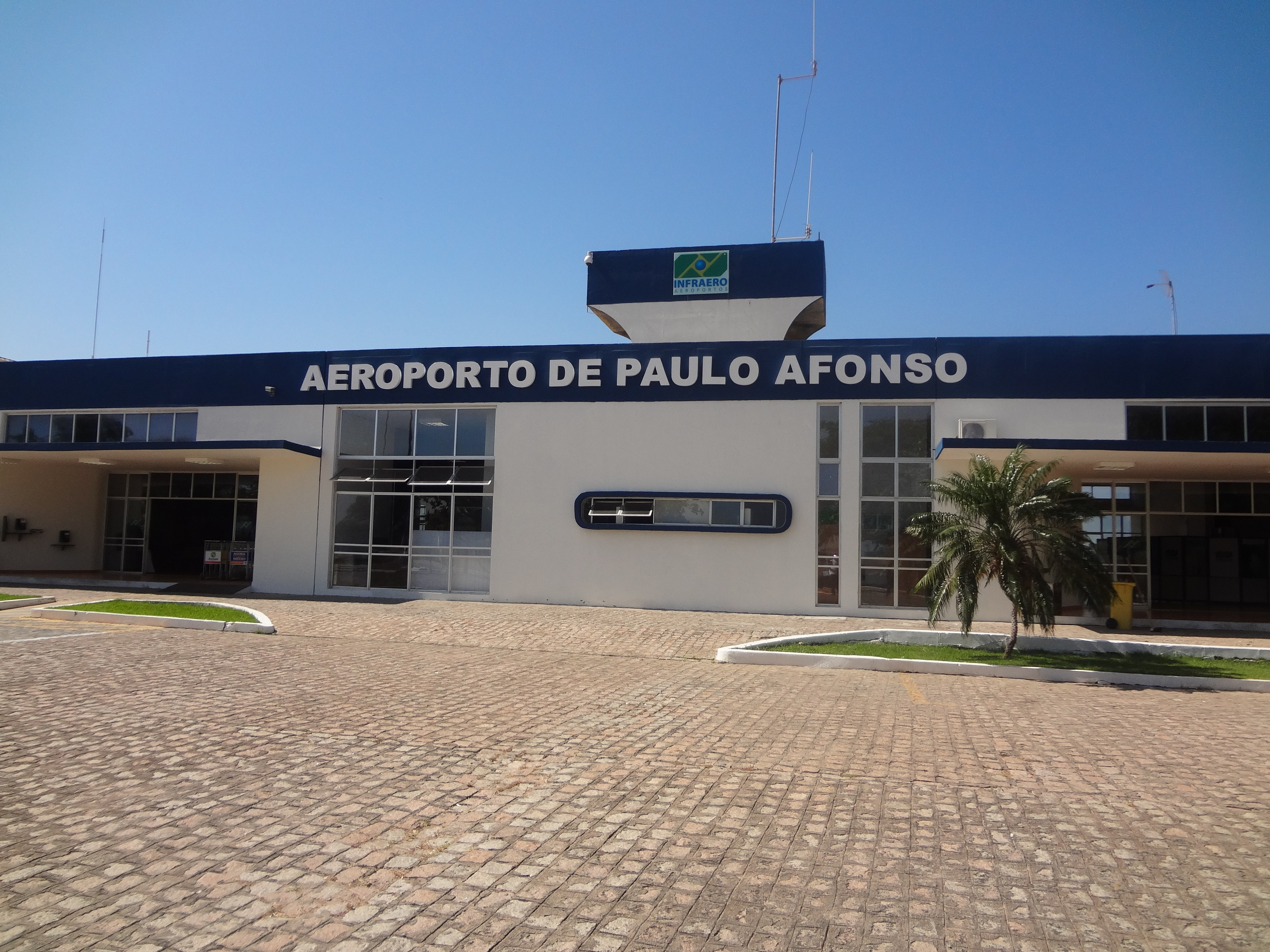
- Terminal landside view in 2013
- IATA: PAV; ICAO: SBUF; LID: BA0007

Summary
- Airport type: Public
- Operator: Infraero (1980–2020); State of Bahia (2020–2022); Infraero (2022–2025); GRU Airport (2025–Present)
- Serves: Paulo Afonso
- Opened: 23 December 1972; 53 years ago
- Time zone: BRT (UTC−03:00)
- Elevation AMSL: 265 m (869 ft)
- Coordinates: 09°24′04″S 038°15′04″W
- Website: www4.infraero.gov.br/aeroporto-paulo-afonso/

Map
- Location in Brazil

Runways
Direction	Length		Surface
Direction	m	ft	Surface
14/32	1,800	5,906	Asphalt

Statistics (2024)
- Passengers: 9,774 ▼48%
- Aircraft Operations: 879 ▼9%
- Metric tonnes of cargo: 0 ▼100%
- Statistics: Infraero; Sources: Airport Website, ANAC, DECEA

Paulo Afonso Airport (IATA: PAV, ICAO: SBUF) is the airport serving Paulo Afonso, Brazil.

It is managed by GRU Airport.

== History ==
The airport was commissioned in 1972 and between 1980 and 2020 it was administrated by Infraero. On November 17, 2020, the Federal Government transferred the administration of the facility to the State of Bahia.

In September, 2022, the State of Bahia signed a contract of operation with Infraero.

On November 27, 2025 GRU Airport won the concession to operate the airport.

== Access ==
The airport is located 6 km (4 mi) from downtown Paulo Afonso.

== See also ==
- List of airports in Brazil
