= Bacacheri Airport =

Airport in Paraná, Brazil

Bacacheri Airport Aeroporto do Bacacheri

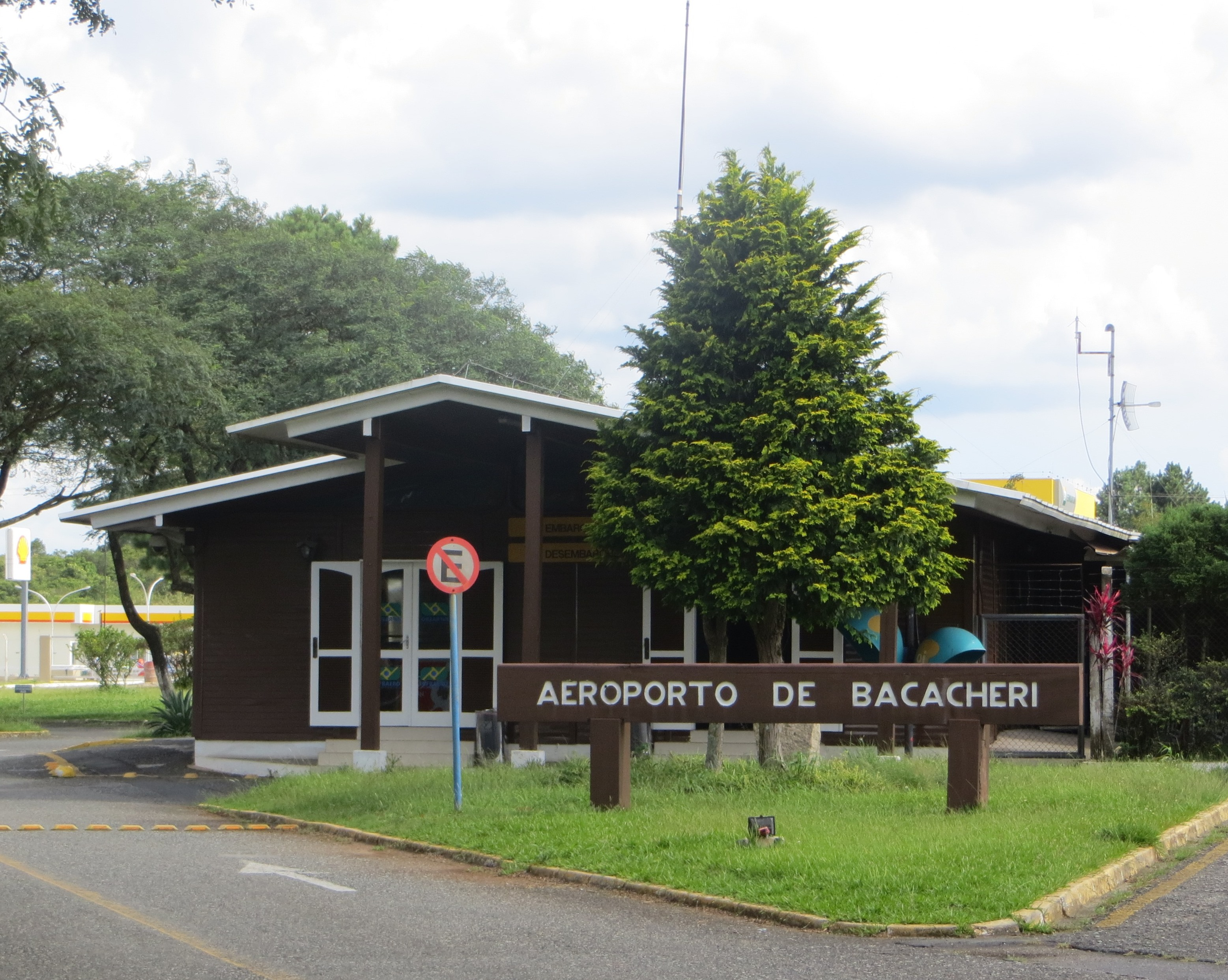
- IATA: BFH; ICAO: SBBI; LID: PR0006

Summary
- Airport type: Public
- Operator: Infraero (1980–2021); Motiva (2021–2026); ASUR (2026–present)
- Serves: Curitiba
- Opened: 1930
- Time zone: BRT (UTC−03:00)
- Elevation AMSL: 932 m (3,058 ft)
- Coordinates: 25°24′12″S 049°14′01″W
- Website: aeroportos.motiva.com.br/bacacheri-pr/

Map
- Location in Brazil BFH (Brazil)

Runways
Direction	Length		Surface
Direction	m	ft	Surface
18/36	1,221	4,005	Asphalt

Statistics (2025)
- Passengers: 0^{a}
- Aircraft Operations: 30,108 ▲12%
- Statistics: Motiva; Sources: Airport Website, ANAC, DECEA; Note:^{a} as of 22 February 2026, no passenger data related to 2025 had been published.

Bacacheri Airport (IATA: BFH, ICAO: SBBI) is an airport in Curitiba, Brazil. It is named after the neighbourhood where it is located.

It is operated by ASUR.

== History ==
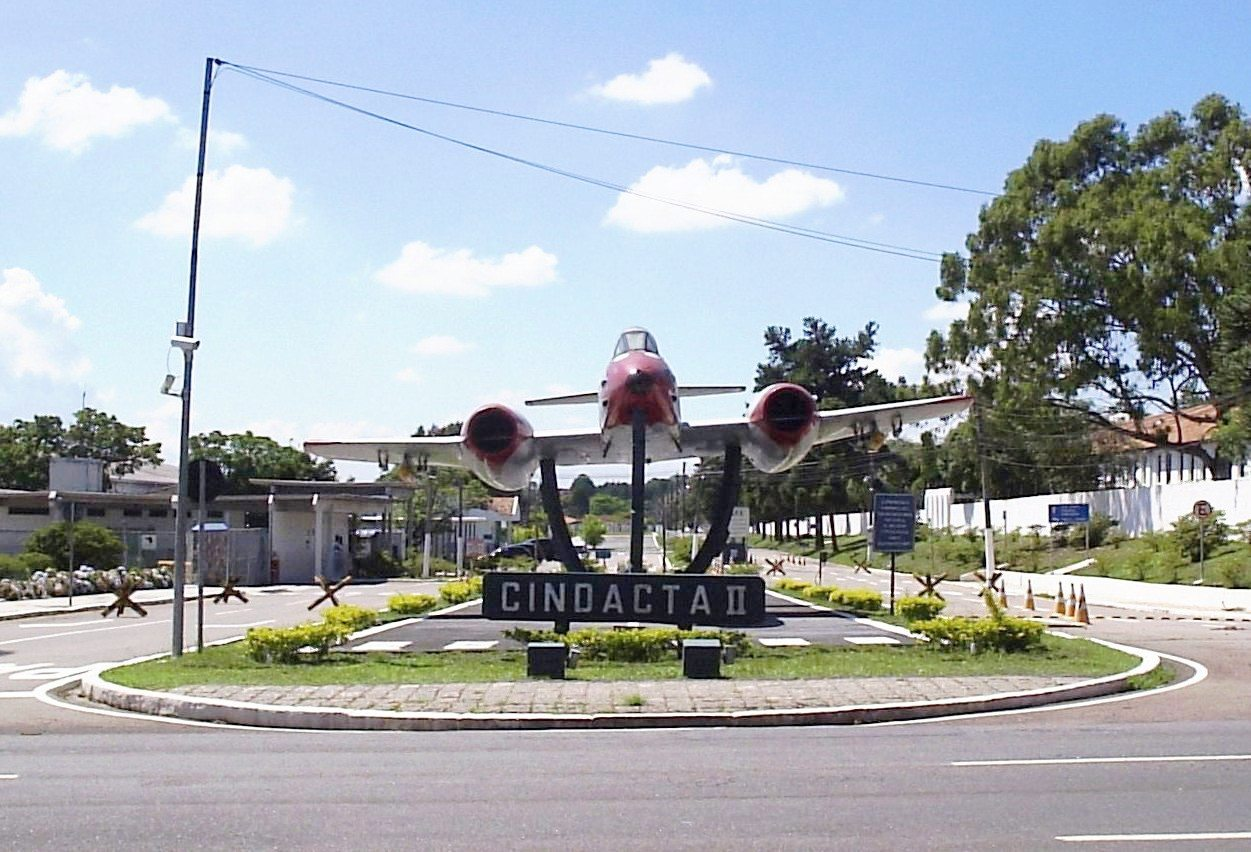
Entry of Cindacta II at Bacacheri Airport

The history of Bacacheri airport begins in 1930 as an air field for Military Aviation. In 1942 the Ministry of Air Force officially upgraded the facility to the status of an Air Force Base.

On March 31, 1980 Bacacheri Air Force Base was de-commissioned and its administration handled over to Infraero. However, Bacacheri still has a strong military presence because the Brazilian Integrated Air Traffic Control and Air Defense Center section 2 (Cindacta II) is located in the vicinity of the airport.

In 1997 the airport was closed for scheduled operations and since then it is mostly dedicated to general aviation and aircraft maintenance operations.

Previously operated by Infraero, on April 7, 2021 CCR won a 30-year concession to operate the airport. On April 26, 2025 CCR was rebranded as Motiva.

On November 18, 2025 the entire airports portfolio of Motiva was sold to the Mexican airport operator ASUR. Motiva will cease to operate airports. The transaction was completed on August 31, 2026.

== Statistics ==
Following are the number of passenger, aircraft and cargo movements at the airport, according to Infraero (2007-2021) and Motiva (2022-2025) reports:

Year	Passenger	Aircraft	Cargo (t)
2025	0	33,850 ▲12%	0
2024	0	30,108 ▲8%	0
2023	0	27,923	0
2022^{a}	0	20,506	0
2021	31,997 ▲77%	29,574 ▲8%	0
2020	18,103 ▼17%	27,311 ▲2%	0
2019	21,750 ▼31%	26,699 ▼5%	0
2018	31,654 ▼51%	28,106 ▲19%	0
2017	64,151 ▼25%	23,586 ▼6%	0
2016	85,761 ▼8%	22,299 ▼11%	0
2015	92,858 ▼30%	24,940 ▼23%	0
2014	132,974 ▲97%	32,222 ▲32%	0
2013	67,414 ▼25%	24,390 ▼18%	0
2012	90,360 ▼11%	29,689 ▼3%	6 ▼96%
2011	101,881 ▲68%	30,650 ▲21%	134 ▼41%
2010	60,678 ▲96%	25,321 ▲11%	226 ▼67%
2009	30,897 ▼10%	22,791 ▼2%	675 ▼29%
2008	34,319 ▼23%	23,222	951 ▲26%
2007	44,770	23,115	756

Note:
^{a}: 2022 series provided by CCR is incomplete, lacking data for the months of January, February and part of March.

== Access ==
The airport is located 7 km (4 mi) from downtown Curitiba.

== See also ==
- List of airports in Brazil
