= Divinópolis Airport =

Brigadeiro Cabral Airport Aeroporto Brigadeiro Cabral

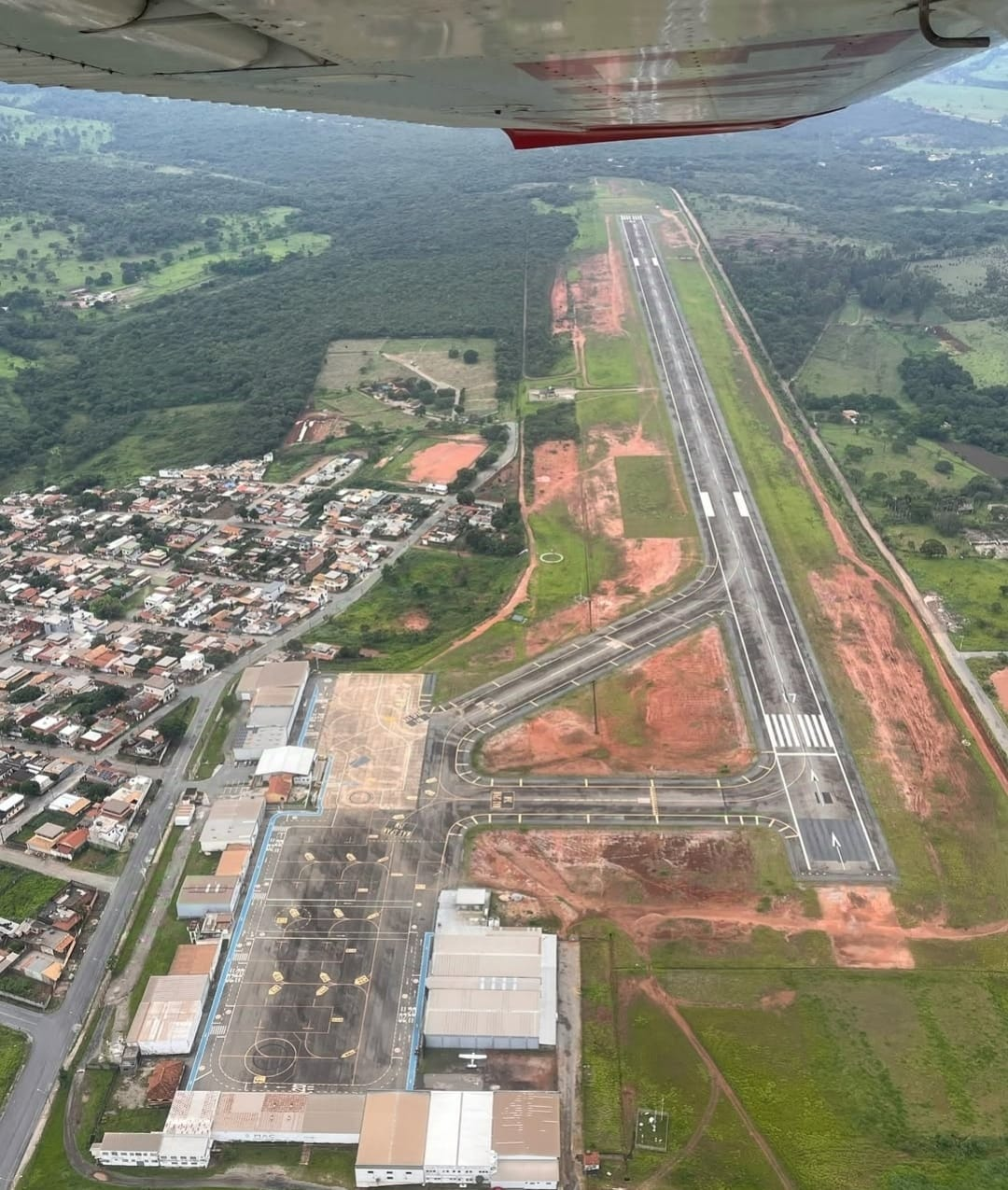
- IATA: DIQ; ICAO: SNDV; LID: MG0015

Summary
- Airport type: Public
- Operator: Infraero (2019–present)
- Serves: Divinópolis
- Time zone: BRT (UTC−03:00)
- Elevation AMSL: 795 m (2,608 ft)
- Coordinates: 20°10′55″S 044°52′12″W
- Website: www4.infraero.gov.br/aeroporto-divinopolis/

Map
- Location in Brazil DIQ (Brazil)

Runways
Direction	Length		Surface
Direction	ft	m	Surface
17/35	5,053	1,540	Asphalt

Statistics (2025)
- Passengers: 2,831 ▲49%
- Aircraft Operations: 7,739 ▲30%
- Metric tonnes of cargo: 25 ▲213%
- Statistics: Infraero; Sources: Airport Website, ANAC, DECEA

Brigadeiro Cabral Airport (IATA: DIQ, ICAO: SNDV) is the airport serving Divinópolis, Brazil.

The airport is located 6 km (4 mi) from downtown Divinópolis and is managed by Infraero.

== History ==
A new passenger terminal was opened on June 1, 2012.

On June 10, 2019, the Municipality of Divinópolis signed a contract of operation with Infraero. On May 7, 2024, the contract of operation was upgraded to a concession.

== Airlines and destinations ==
Airlines	Destinations
Azul Conecta	Belo Horizonte–Confins

== See also ==
- List of airports in Brazil
