= Motiva (CCR) =

Transportation company

- Type: Sociedade Anônima
- Traded as: B3: MOTV3; Ibovespa Component
- Industry: Transportation
- Founded: 1999
- Headquarters: São Paulo, Brazil
- Key people: Miguel Setas (CEO)
- Products: Administration of highways Metro system Airport operation Vehicle inspection,
- Revenue: ▲US$ 15.3 billion (2025)
- Net income: ▲US$ 3.27 billion (2025)
- Number of employees: 7,129
- Subsidiaries: Motiva Linha 4; Motiva Linhas 5 e 17; ViaMobilidade Linhas 8 e 9
- Website: www.motiva.com.br

Motiva, formerly CCR and Companhia de Concessões Rodoviárias, is a transportation company with interests in private interstate highway concessions, airport operations and metro systems in Brazil and other countries. The Company controls 9 subsidiary concession holders, through which it works a public-private business model for the operation of toll-roads, aiming to centralize the management of a portfolio of toll concessions and service companies.

The Company operates approximately 3,000 kilometers of toll-roads. Its portfolio includes six toll concessions: AutoBAn, NovaDutra, Ponte Rio-Niteroi, Rodonorte, ViaOeste and Via Lagos. CCR is owned by, Camargo Corrêa (17.00%), Andrade Gutierrez (17.00%) and Soares Penido (17.22%) and free float (48.78%). The Company's centralized services are Actua, Engelog, Parques Servicios and STP offering administrative centers, logistics and engineering, traffic control and monitoring, and electronic toll-charging systems, respectively.

Currently, the company is the largest highways' operator in Latin America and through its subsidiary Motiva Linha 4 operates the Line 4-Yellow of São Paulo Metro, Motiva Linhas 5 e 17 operates Line 5-Lilac and Line 17-Gold of São Paulo Metro, ViaMobilidade Linhas 8 e 9 operates Line 8-Diamond and Line 9-Emerald of São Paulo Metropolitan Trains and Metrô Bahia operates the Salvador Metro. The company operates the Belo Horizonte International Airport, Quito International Airport, the San José International Airport in Costa Rica and Curaçao International Airport. Also operates the vehicle inspection company Controlar. The CCR's main competitors are Ecorodovias, Triunfo and Arteris.

On April 7, 2021 CCR won the concession to operate, for 30 years, the following airports in Brazil: Curitiba-Afonso Pena International Airport, Curitiba-Bacacheri Airport, Foz do Iguaçu International Airport, Londrina Airport, Navegantes Airport, Joinville-Lauro Carneiro de Loyola Airport, Pelotas International Airport, Ruben Berta International Airport, Bagé-Comte. Gustavo Kraemer International Airport, Goiânia-Santa Genoveva Airport, Palmas Airport, Teresina Airport, Petrolina Airport, São Luís-Mal. Cunha Machado International Airport, and Imperatriz Airport.

On October 5, 2021 CCR S.A. won a 30-year concession to operate Belo Horizonte/Pampulha–Carlos Drummond de Andrade Airport.

In April 2025, the company was rebranded as Motiva.
