= Uberaba Airport =

Uberaba–Mário de Almeida Franco Airport Aeroporto de Uberaba–Mário de Almeida Franco
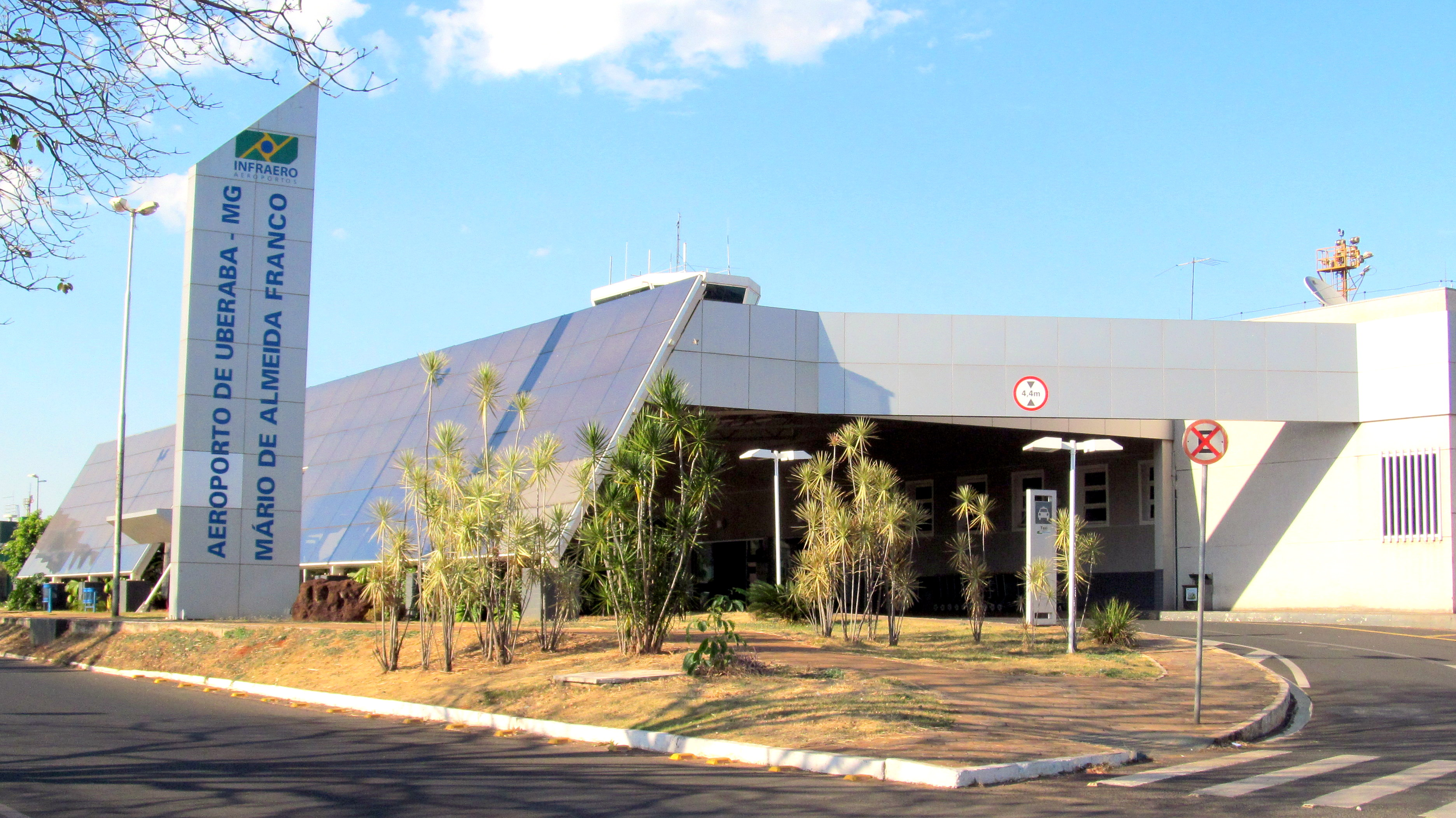
- IATA: UBA; ICAO: SBUR; LID: MG0009

Summary
- Airport type: Public
- Operator: Infraero (1980–2022); AENA (2022–present)
- Serves: Uberaba
- Opened: May 23, 1935
- Time zone: BRT (UTC−03:00)
- Elevation AMSL: 809 m / 2,654 ft
- Coordinates: 19°45′53″S 047°57′58″W

Map
- Location in Brazil UBA (Brazil)

Runways
Direction	Length		Surface
Direction	m	ft	Surface
17/35	1,759	5,771	Asphalt

Statistics (2025)
- Passengers: 76,509 ▼24%
- Aircraft Operations: 6,103 ▼12%
- Metric tonnes of cargo: 104 ▼27%
- Statistics: AENA; Sources: ANAC, DECEA

Uberaba–Mário de Almeida Franco Airport (IATA: UBA, ICAO: SBUR) is the airport serving Uberaba, Brazil.

Formerly operated by Infraero, on August 18, 2022, the consortium AENA secured a 30-year contract to manage the airport.

== History ==
Uberaba Airport was established on May 23, 1935, initially named in honor of Alberto Santos-Dumont. On September 14, 2007, it was renamed after Mário de Almeida Franco (1910-1974), a rural settlement owner who donated the area for the construction of the airport.

== Airlines and destinations ==
Airlines	Destinations
Azul Brazilian Airlines	Belo Horizonte–Confins
LATAM Brasil	São Paulo–Guarulhos

== Accidents and incidents ==
- 11 December 2004: a NHR Táxi Aéreo Embraer EMB 110 Bandeirante registration PT-WAK flying a cargo flight from São Paulo–Guarulhos to Uberaba. The aircraft carried 1,524 kg of cargo, bringing the takeoff weight to 6,348 kg, whereas the maximum takeoff weight was 5,600 kg. While on final approach, weather had worsened with visibility conditions below minima. As the captain was looking for the runway in a hole in the clouds, the weight of unsecured cargo had shifted, the aircraft stalled and crashed onto a house killing one person inside. The crew of two also perished.

== Access ==
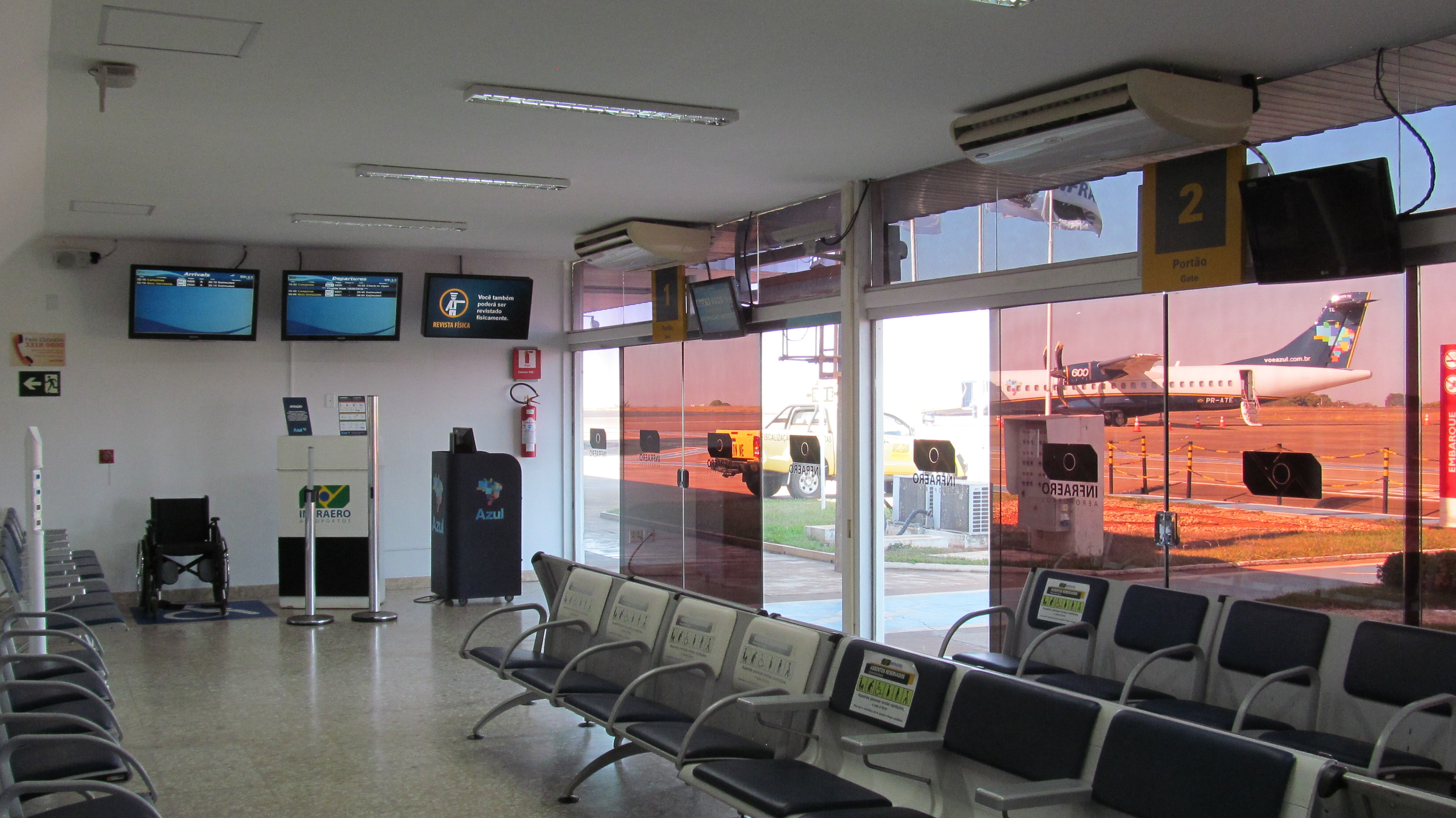
Departure Gate at UBA Airport (2016)

The airport is situated 4 km (2,5 mi) from downtown Uberaba.

== See also ==
- List of airports in Brazil
