= Marabá Airport =

João Correa da Rocha Airport Aeroporto João Correa da Rocha
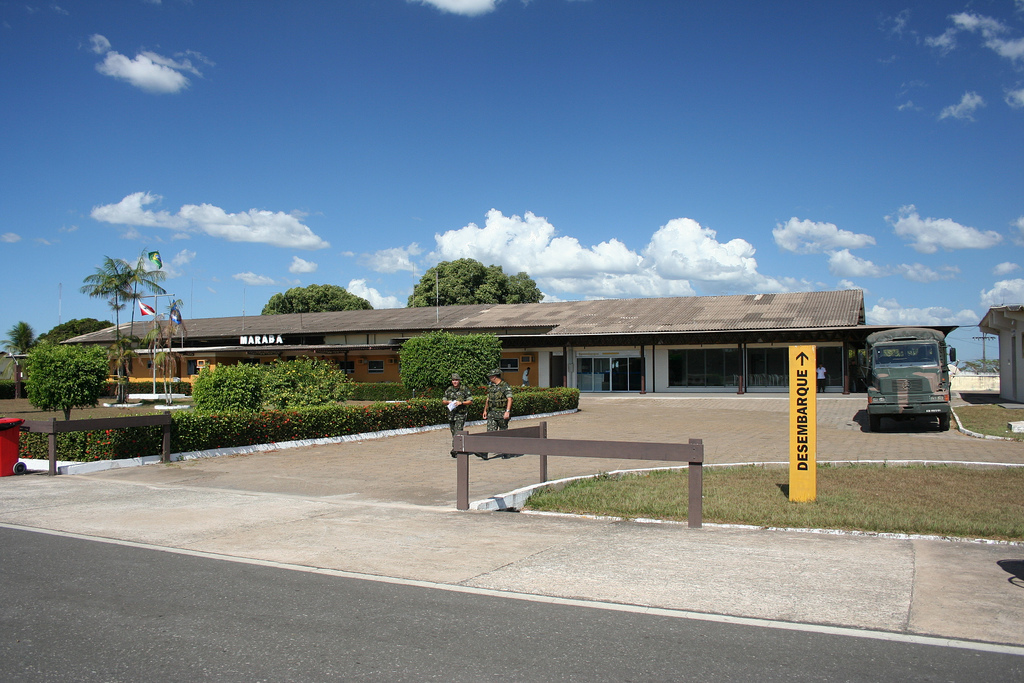
- IATA: MAB; ICAO: SBMA; LID: PA0004

Summary
- Airport type: Public
- Operator: Infraero (1980–2022); AENA (2022–present)
- Serves: Marabá
- Opened: 20 May 1978; 48 years ago
- Time zone: BRT (UTC−03:00)
- Elevation AMSL: 109 m (358 ft)
- Coordinates: 05°22′05″S 049°08′17″W

Map
- Location in Brazil MAB (Brazil)

Runways
Direction	Length		Surface
Direction	m	ft	Surface
07/25	2,000	6,562	Asphalt

Statistics (2025)
- Passengers: 379,347
- Aircraft Operations: 5,807 ▼16%
- Metric tonnes of cargo: 898 ▼28%
- Statistics: AENA; Sources: ANAC, DECEA

João Correa da Rocha Airport (IATA: MAB, ICAO: SBMA) is the airport serving Marabá, Brazil.

The airport is operated by AENA.

== History ==
The airport was commissioned on May 20, 1978.

Previously operated by Infraero, on August 18, 2022, the consortium AENA won a 30-year concession to operate the airport.

== Airlines and destinations ==
Airlines	Destinations
Azul Brazilian Airlines	Belém, Belo Horizonte–Confins
Gol Linhas Aéreas	Brasília
LATAM Brasil	Brasília

== Access ==
The airport is located 5 km (3 mi) from downtown Marabá.

== See also ==
- List of airports in Brazil
