= Carlos Drummond de Andrade Airport =

Airport in Belo Horizonte, Minas Gerais, Brazil

Pampulha–Carlos Drummond de Andrade Airport Aeroporto da Pampulha–Carlos Drummond de Andrade

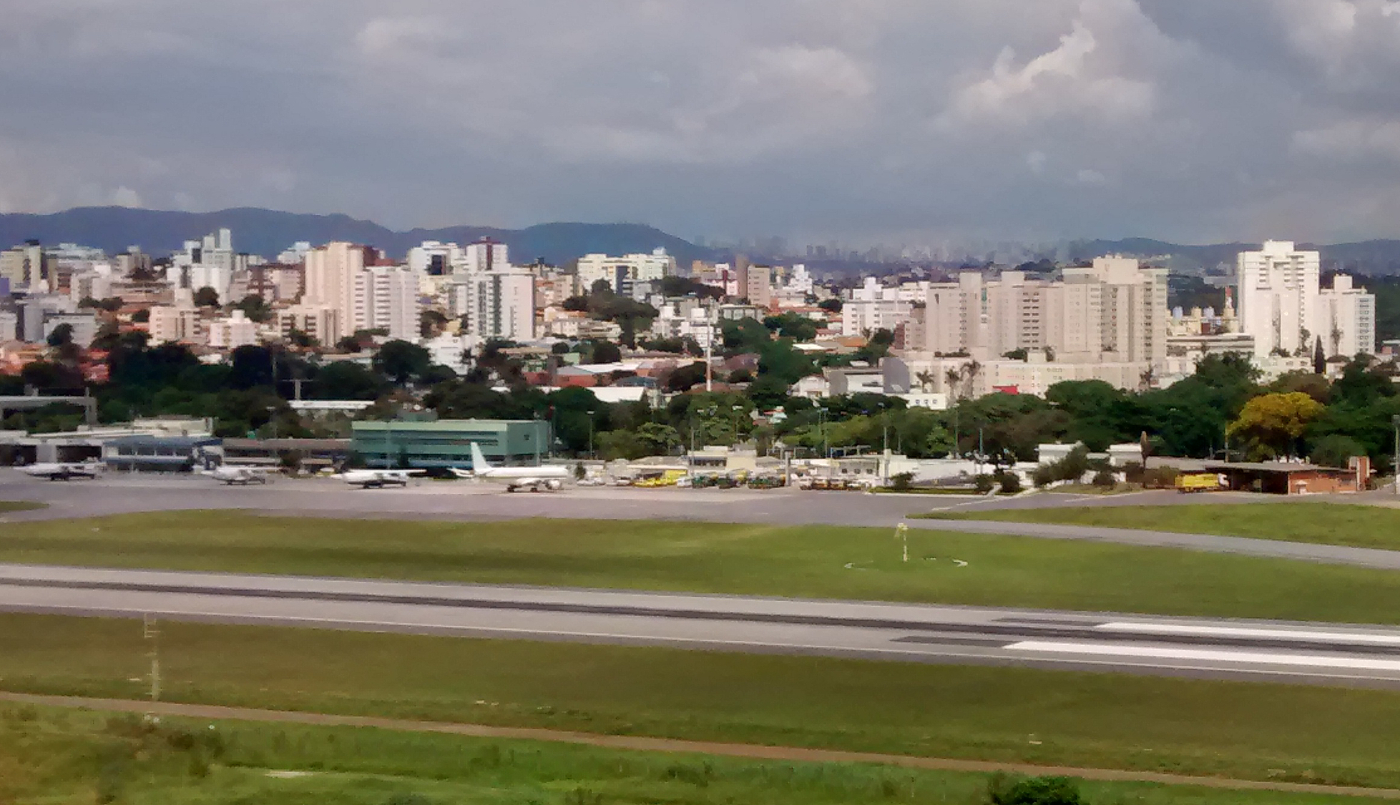
- IATA: PLU; ICAO: SBBH; LID: MG0003

Summary
- Airport type: Public/Military
- Operator: Infraero (1974–2020); State of Minas Gerais (2020–2021); Motiva (2021–2026); ASUR (2026–present)
- Serves: Belo Horizonte
- Opened: 3 March 1933; 93 years ago
- Time zone: BRT (UTC−03:00)
- Elevation AMSL: 789 m (2,589 ft)
- Coordinates: 19°51′07″S 043°57′02″W
- Website: aeroportos.motiva.com.br/pampulha-mg/

Map
- Location in Brazil PLU (Brazil Minas Gerais) PLU (Brazil)

Runways
Direction	Length		Surface
Direction	m	ft	Surface
13/31	2,364	7,756	Asphalt

Statistics (2025)
- Passengers: 0^{a}
- Aircraft Operations: 62,176 ▲11%
- Statistics: Motiva; Sources: Airport Website, ANAC, DECEA; Note:^{a} as of 21 February 2026, no passenger data related to 2025 had been published.

Pampulha–Carlos Drummond de Andrade Airport (IATA: PLU, ICAO: SBBH) is an airport serving Belo Horizonte, Brazil, located in the neighborhood of Pampulha. Since December 16, 2004, the airport is also named after the Minas Gerais-born poet Carlos Drummond de Andrade (1902–1987).

It is operated by ASUR.

== History ==
Pampulha Airport was opened in 1933 as a support facility for passenger flights operated by the Brazilian Air Force between Rio de Janeiro and Fortaleza. The first commercial operation started in 1936, when Panair do Brasil was granted a concession to fly between Rio de Janeiro and Belo Horizonte.

In 1943, the runway was extended to 1,500m x 45m, in 1953 to 1,700m, and finally in 1961 to 2,505m.

With the great increase of traffic at Pampulha Airport, the facility became too small and unable to handle all operations. For this reason, the new Tancredo Neves International Airport was built in the adjoining municipality of Confins. The new facility was opened in March 1984.

Due to the long distance between Belo Horizonte and Confins, Pampulha remained the airport of choice for most airlines, eventually becoming overcrowded, while Confins was under-used. In order to revert this scenario, in March 2005 the government of the state of Minas Gerais with the support of agencies of the Federal government decided to restrict Pampulha to operations of aircraft with capacity of up to 50 passengers. In the months thereafter, most operations were forced to move to Confins and Pampulha gained a new vocation as a hub for regional flights and general aviation.

On 31 August 2009, Infraero unveiled a BRL8.4 million (USD4.4 million; EUR3.1 million) investment plan to upgrade Pampulha Airport focusing on the preparations for the 2014 FIFA World Cup, which was held in Brazil, Belo Horizonte being one of the venue cities. The investment was used to build a new control tower, upgrade the general aviation hangars, and enlarge the apron.

On June 30, 2019 the airport was closed for scheduled operations and since then it is dedicated to general aviation, aircraft maintenance and flying schools operations.

Between 1973 and 2020, the airport was operated by Infraero. On June 17, 2020, the Federal Government signed and agreement to transfer the administration of the airport from Infraero to the Government of the State of Minas Gerais. The transition period ended on December 31, 2020.

On October 5, 2021, CCR won a 30-year concession to operate the airport. On April 26, 2025 CCR was rebranded as Motiva.

On November 18, 2025 the entire airports portfolio of Motiva was sold to the Mexican airport operator ASUR. Motiva will cease to operate airports. The transaction was completed on August 31, 2026.

== Statistics ==
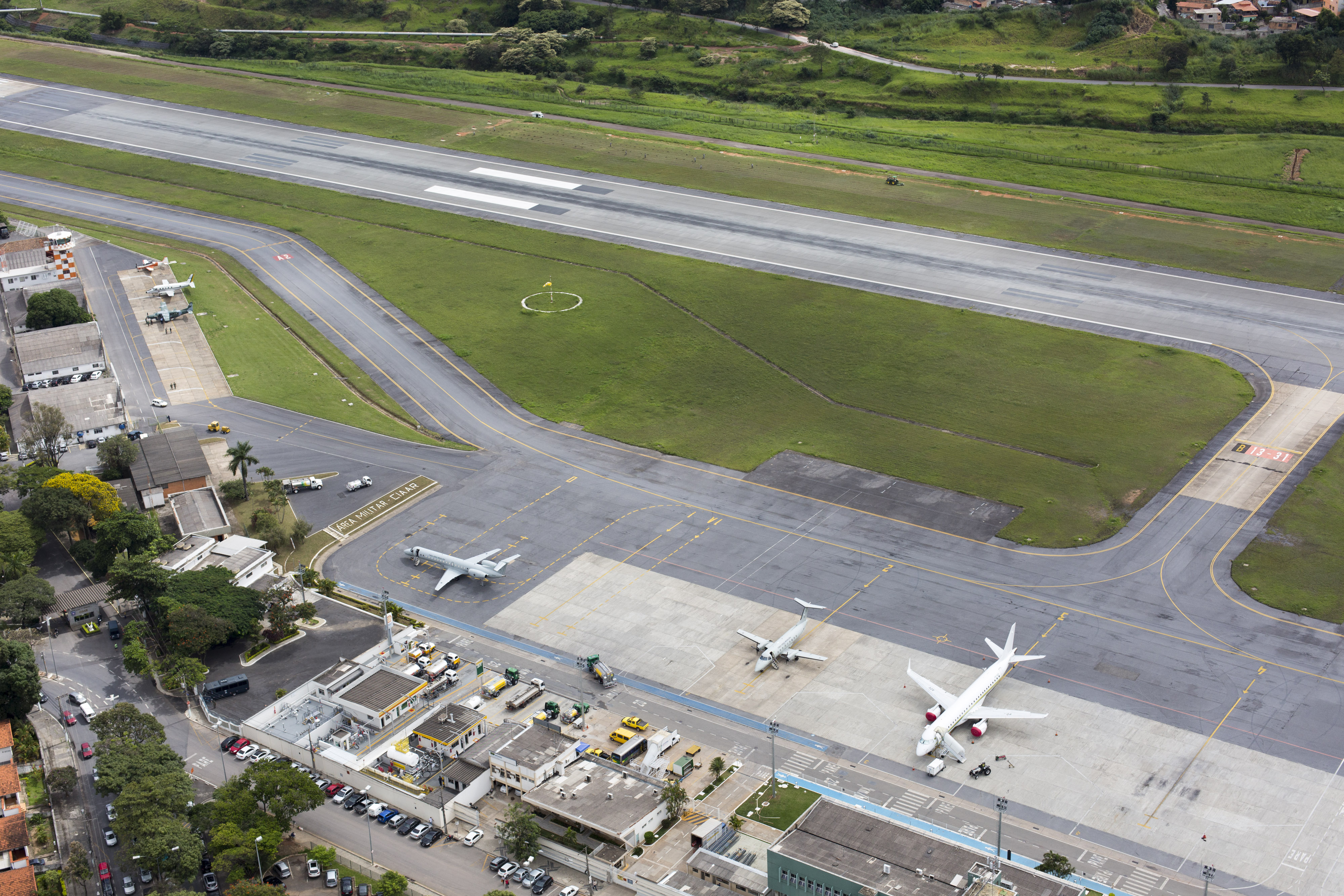
Apron

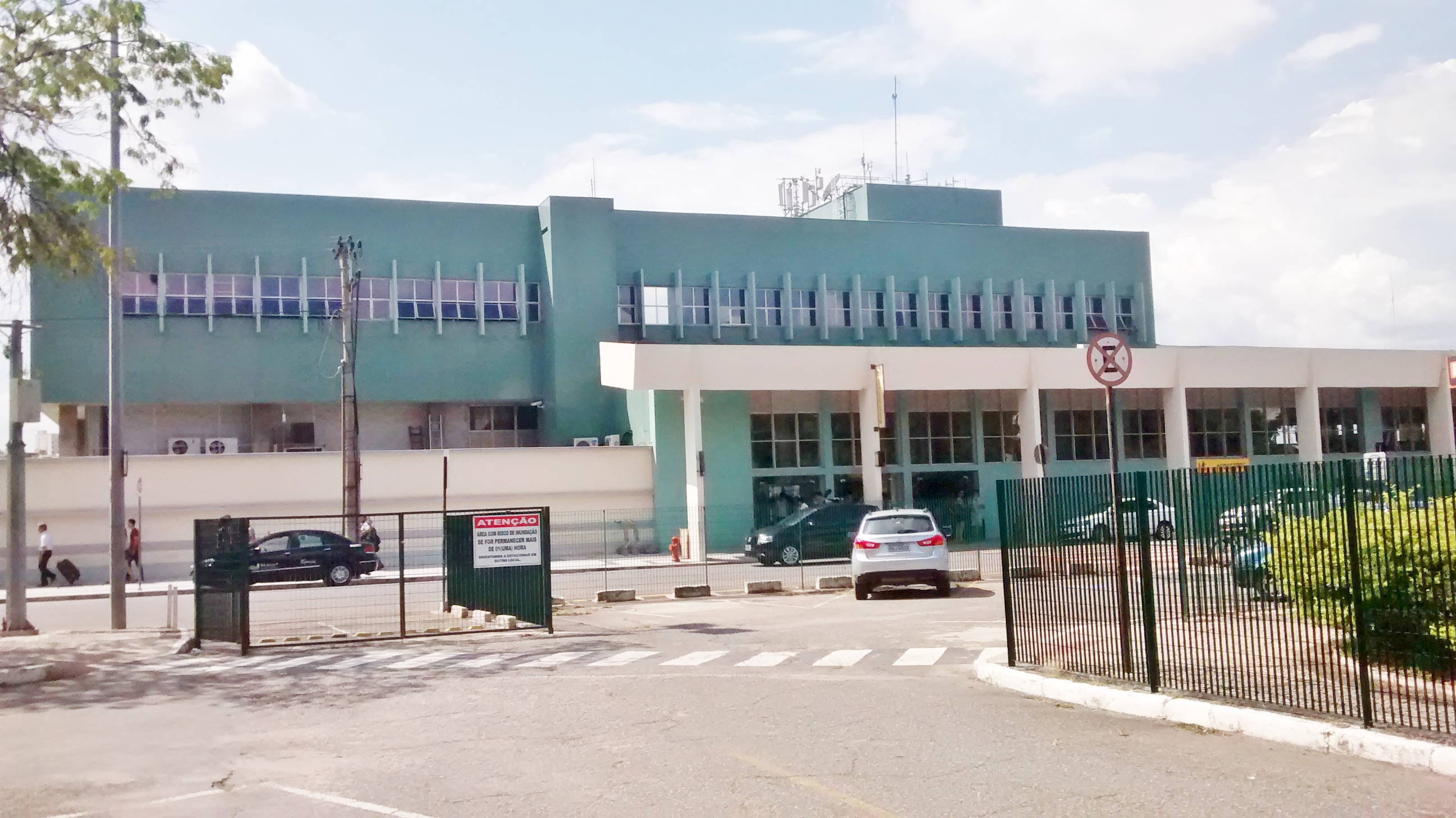
Passenger terminal land side

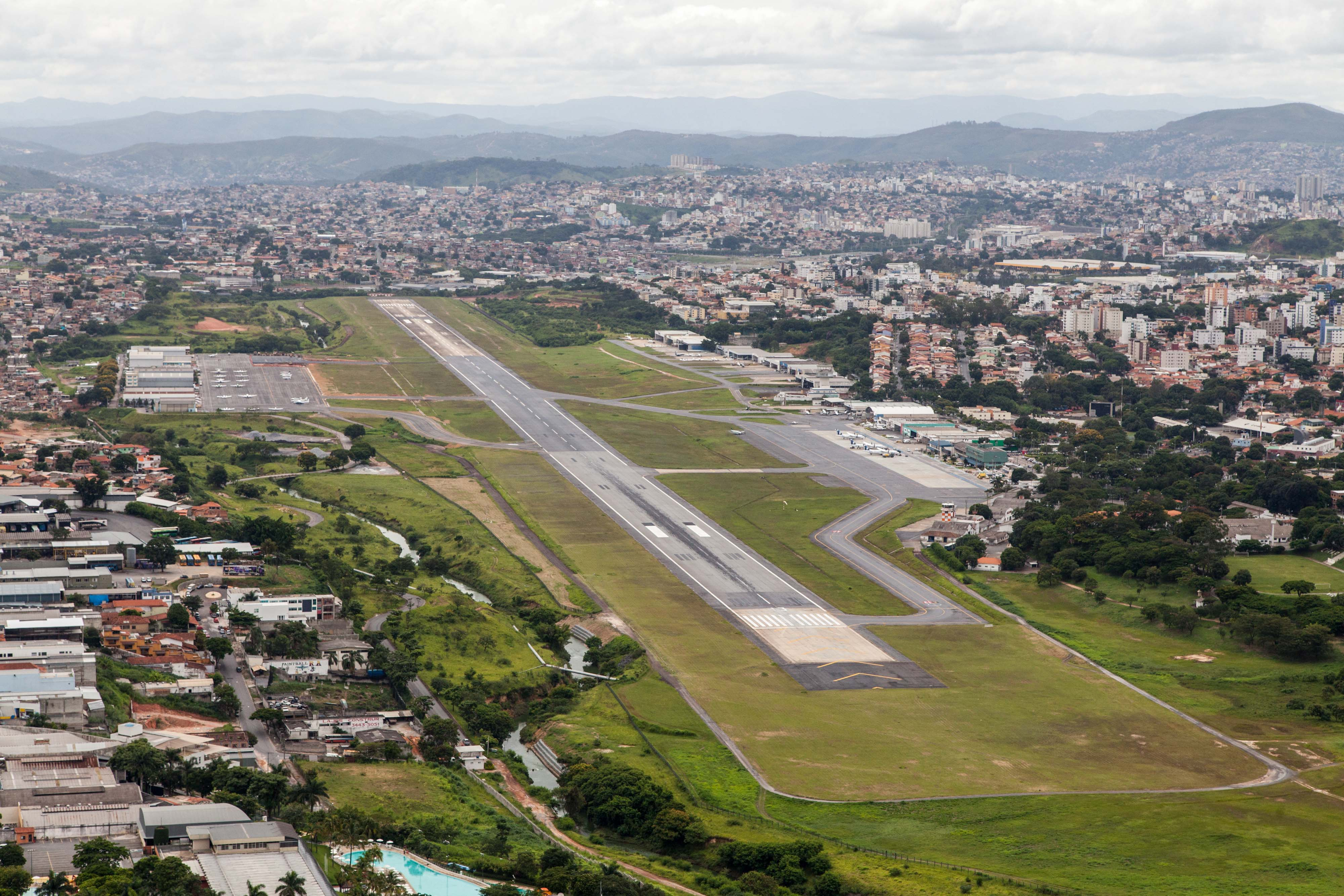
Runway 13/31

Following are the number of passenger, aircraft and cargo movements at the airport, according to Infraero (2007-2021) and Motiva (2022-2025) reports:

Year	Passenger	Aircraft	Cargo (t)
2025^{d}	0	62,176 ▲11%	
2024^{c}	59,682	55,953 ▲11%	0 ▼100%
2023	203,374	50,375	7 ▼53%
2022^{b}	137,101	28,753	15 ▲1,400%
2021	148,854	37,407 ▲28%	1 ▼91%
2020	149,441 ▼17%	29,319 ▼19%	11 ▲1,100%
2019^{a}	179,685 ▼13%	36,133 ▼7%	0 ▼100%
2018	205,615 ▼12%	38,667 ▼4%	4 ▲400%
2017	234,675 ▼22%	40,159 ▼4%	0 ▼100%
2016	300,061 ▼58%	41,640 ▼18%	14 ▲250%
2015	712,553 ▼25%	50,802 ▼21%	4 ▲400%
2014	945,434 ▼4%	64,096 ▼2%	0
2013	989,599 ▲28%	65,487 ▼10%	0
2012	774,881 ▼2%	72,892 ▲11%	0
2011	793,305 ▲5%	65,854 ▼1%	0
2010	757,685 ▲27%	66,650 ▲14%	0
2009	598,360 ▲7%	58,288 ▲1%	0
2008	561,189 ▼26%	57,776 ▲9%	0 ▼100%
2007	759,824	52,812	290

Note:
^{a}: Operations of regular scheduled flights ceased on June 30, 2019.
^{b}: 2022 series provided by CCR is incomplete, starting May 1, 2022, the day CCR took over the facility.
^{c}: 2024 passenger series provided by CCR is incomplete lacking August.
^{d}: as of 21 February 2026, no passenger data related to 2025 had been published.

== Accidents and incidents ==
- 31 May 1954: Transportes Aéreos Nacional, a Douglas DC-3/C-47A-80-DL, registration PP-ANO, en route from Governador Valadares to Belo Horizonte-Pampulha, strayed off course and struck the Cipó mountain range in cloudy conditions. All 19 passengers and crew died.
- 20 April 2021: a Learjet 35A belonging to Electric Power Construção, registration PT-MLA, crashed during landing after a test flight. The plane had a runway excursion, breaking a perimeter fence. One of the two pilots was killed, and two other occupants were injured.
- 6 March 2024: a Federal Police of Brazil Cessna 208 Grand Caravan, registration PR-AAB crashed on takeoff from runway 31. After takeoff, the engine failed and the pilots attempted an emergency landing on the opposite threshold. The aircraft collided with the ground. Two of the three onboard died.

== Access ==
The airport is located 8 km (5 mi) from downtown Belo Horizonte.

== See also ==
- List of airports in Brazil
