= SETE Linhas Aéreas =

Brazilian airline

IATA	ICAO	Call sign
5O	SLX	SETE
- Founded: 1999
- Ceased operations: 2017
- Operating bases: Goiânia/Santa Genoveva Airport
- Hubs: Hub Airports List: Goiânia/Santa Genoveva Airport; Brasília International Airport; Palmas Airport; Marabá Airport; Belém/Val de Cans International Airport
- Frequent-flyer program: none
- Alliance: none
- Fleet size: 0
- Parent company: Grupo SETE
- Headquarters: Goiânia, Goiás, Brazil
- Key people: Luiz Roberto Vilella (managing director); Eriston Ricardo Macedo de Araújo (managing director)
- Website: www.voesete.com.br

SETE Linhas Aéreas Ltda. (Serviços Especiais de Transportes Executivos) was a domestic airline based in Goiânia, Brazil founded in 1999. The company operated in several cities located in the brazilian states of Goiás, Tocantins, Mato Grosso, Pará and Amapá, and also in the Federal District (Brasília) but since January 1, 2016 it is grounded for restructuring.

According to the National Civil Aviation Agency of Brazil (ANAC), between January and December 2015 Sete had 0.1% of the domestic market share in terms of passengers per kilometer flown.

== History ==
SETE traces its origins to 1976, when Rolim Adolfo Amaro, also founder of TAM Airlines, created an airline specialized in general aviation and maintenance. The airline was sold to Luis Roberto Villela in 1980, who bought its first aircraft, a Mitsubishi.

In 1995 SETE built a hangar at Goiânia Airport and in 1998 it started to offer air-medical services. In 1999 SETE received authorization to operate charter flights and in 2006 it became a regular carrier. Its fleet then consisted of 3 Cessna 208B Grand Caravan. A fourth Cessna arrived in 2000 and a fifth in 2002.

In spite of being the main regional airline of both Central and North-Central regions of Brazil, all regular services were indefinitely suspended on January 1, 2016. During the suspension all services of the airline will be restructured including routes and aircraft. Air taxi services are not affected.

== Destinations ==
As of December 2015 SETE Linhas Aéreas operated scheduled services to the following destinations:

City	Airport Code		Airport	Note
City	IATA	ICAO	Airport	Note
Altamira	ATM	SBHT	Altamira Airport	Terminated
Araguaína	AUX	SWGN	Araguaína Airport	Terminated
Belém	BEL	SBBE	Val de Cans–Júlio Cezar Ribeiro International Airport	Terminated
Brasília	BSB	SBBR	Pres. Juscelino Kubitschek International Airport	Terminated
Carajás (Parauapebas)	CKS	SBCJ	Carajás Airport	Terminated
Carolina	CLN	SBCI	Brig. Lysias Augusto Rodrigues Airport	Terminated
Conceição do Araguaia	CDJ	SBAA	Conceição do Araguaia Airport	Terminated
Confresa	CFO	SJHG	Confresa Airport	Terminated
Fortaleza	FOR	SBFZ	Pinto Martins International Airport	Terminated
Goiânia	GYN	SBGO	Santa Genoveva Airport	Terminated
Gurupi	GRP	SWGI	Gurupi Airport	Terminated
Imperatriz	IMP	SBIZ	Pref. Renato Moreira Airport	Terminated
Itaituba	ITB	SBIH	Itaituba Airport	Terminated
Macapá	MCP	SBMQ	Macapá Airport	Terminated
Marabá	MAB	SBMA	João Correia da Rocha Airport	Terminated
Monte Dourado (Almeirim)	MEU	SBMD	Serra do Areão Airport	Terminated
Minaçu	MQH	SWIQ	Minaçu Airport	Terminated
Ourilândia do Norte	OIA	SDOW	Ourilândia do Norte Airport	Terminated
Palmas	PMW	SBPJ	Brig. Lysias Rodrigues Airport	Terminated
Parnaíba	PHB	SBPB	Pref. Dr. João Silva Filho Airport	Terminated
Redenção	RDC	SNDC	Redenção Airport	Terminated
Santana do Araguaia	CMP	SNKE	Santana do Araguaia Airport	Terminated
Santarém	STM	SBSN	Maestro Wilson Fonseca Airport	Terminated
São Félix do Araguaia	SXO	SWFX	São Félix do Araguaia Airport	Terminated
São Félix do Xingu	SXX	SNFX	São Félix do Xingu Airport	Terminated
São Luís	SLZ	SBSL	Mal. Cunha Machado International Airport	Terminated
Teresina	THE	SBTE	Sen. Petrônio Portella Airport	Terminated
Tucuruí	TUR	SBTU	Tucuruí Airport	Terminated

== Fleet ==
As of July 2015 the fleet of Sete Linhas Aéreas included the following aircraft:

SETE Linhas Aéreas fleet
Aircraft	Total	Orders	Passengers (Y)	Introduced	Notes
Cessna 208B Grand Caravan	5	–	9	1999	
Embraer EMB 120RT Brasília	3	–	30	2010	

== Airline affinity program ==
SETE Linhas Aéreas has no Frequent Flyer Program.

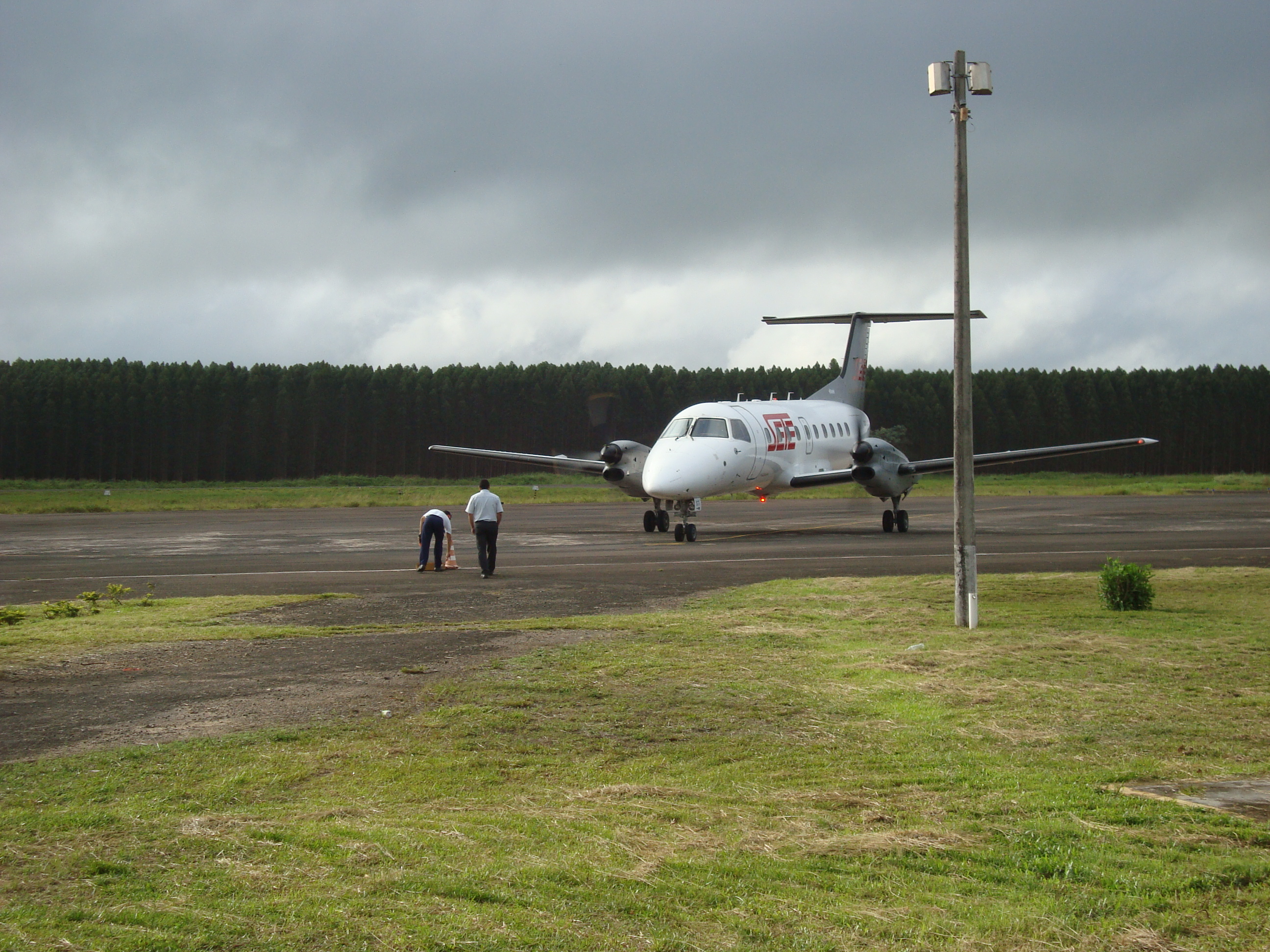
Embraer EMB 120 at Monte Dourado Airport

== See also ==
- List of defunct airlines of Brazil
