= Brasil Central Linhas Aéreas =

Brazilian airline

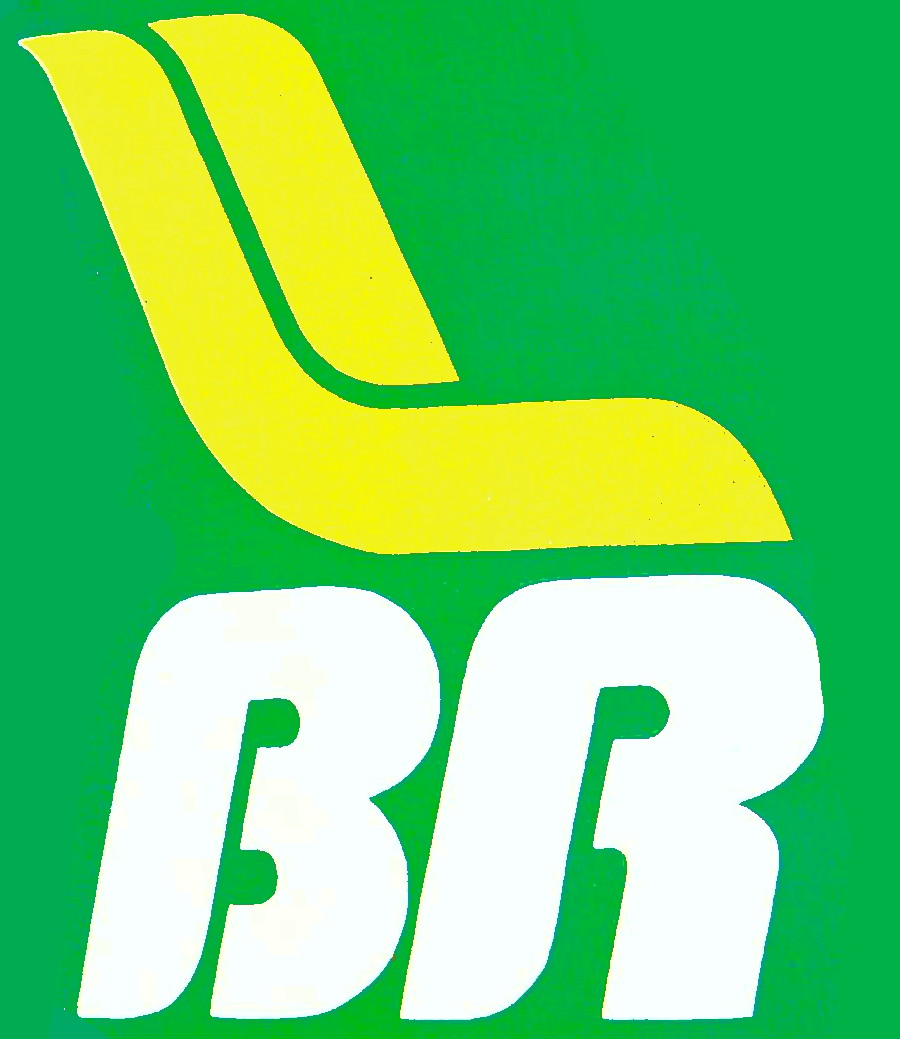
IATA	ICAO	Call sign
JJ	BLC	—
- Founded: 12 February 1976 (As Voos Técnicos e Executivos)
- Commenced operations: 12 October 1976 (as Voos Técnicos e Executivos)
- Ceased operations: 2003
- Parent company: TAM Linhas Aéreas
- Headquarters: Brasília, Brazil
- Key people: Klaus Richard Hoelck; Rolim Adolfo Ammaro

Brasil Central Linhas Aéreas was a Brazilian airline founded in 1976 as VOTEC Serviços Aéreos Regionais. In 1986 its name was changed to Brasil Central Linhas Aéreas and in 1990 to TAM – Transportes Aéreos Meridionais. In 2000 it was merged into TAM – Transportes Aéreos Regionais, creating TAM Linhas Aéreas.

== History ==
On November 11, 1975 the Brazilian Federal Government created the Brazilian Integrated System of Regional Air Transportation and divided the country in five different regions, for which five newly created regional airlines received a concession to operate air services. VOTEC Serviços Aéreos Regionais S/A was the fifth of those regional airlines to be made operational. Its services started on October 11, 1976 and its operational area comprised roughly parts of the Central-West, North, Southeast and Northeast regions of Brazil, specifically the states of Goiás, Tocantins, and Federal District, and parts of Pará, Maranhão, Minas Gerais and connecting services to Rio de Janeiro and São Paulo.

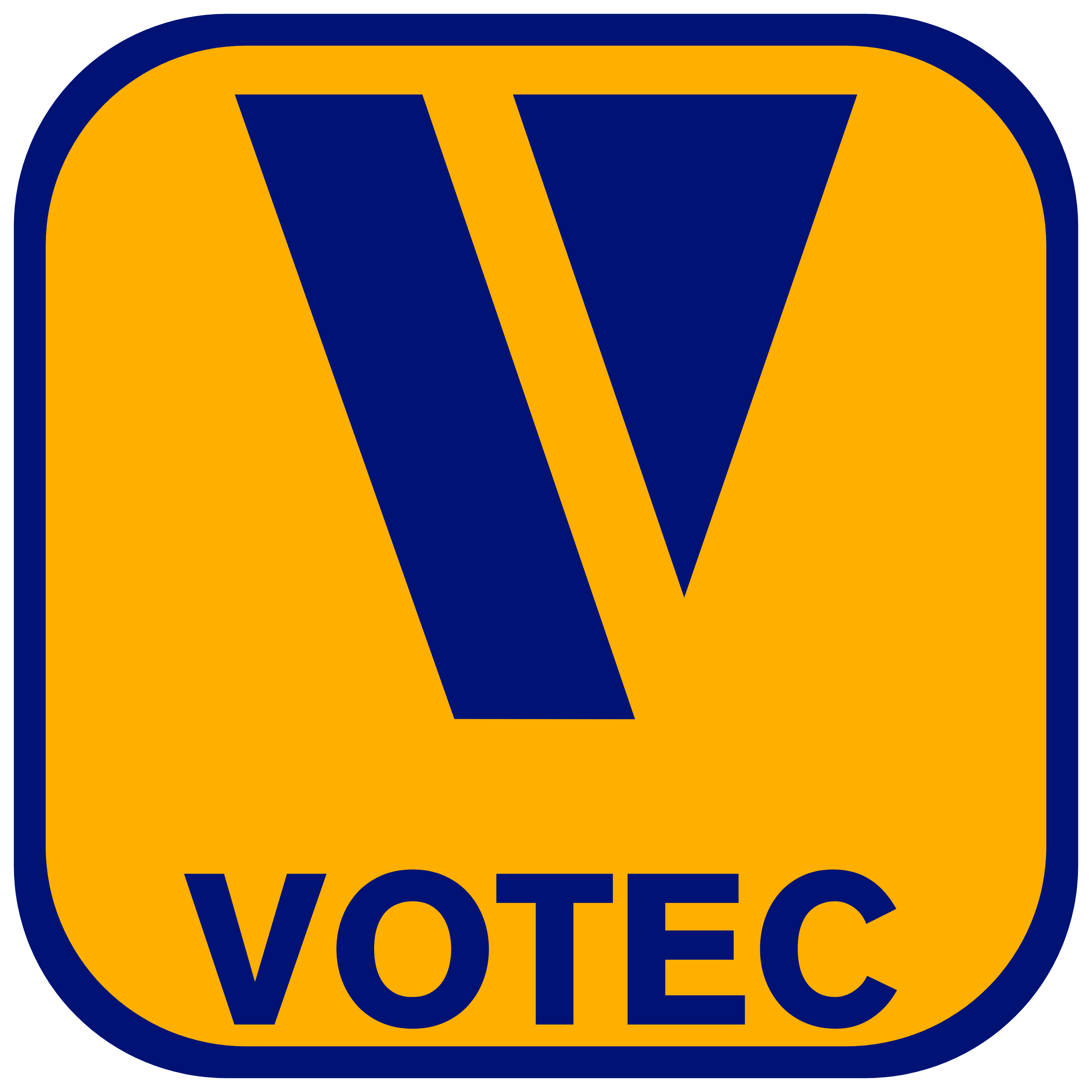
VOTEC logo

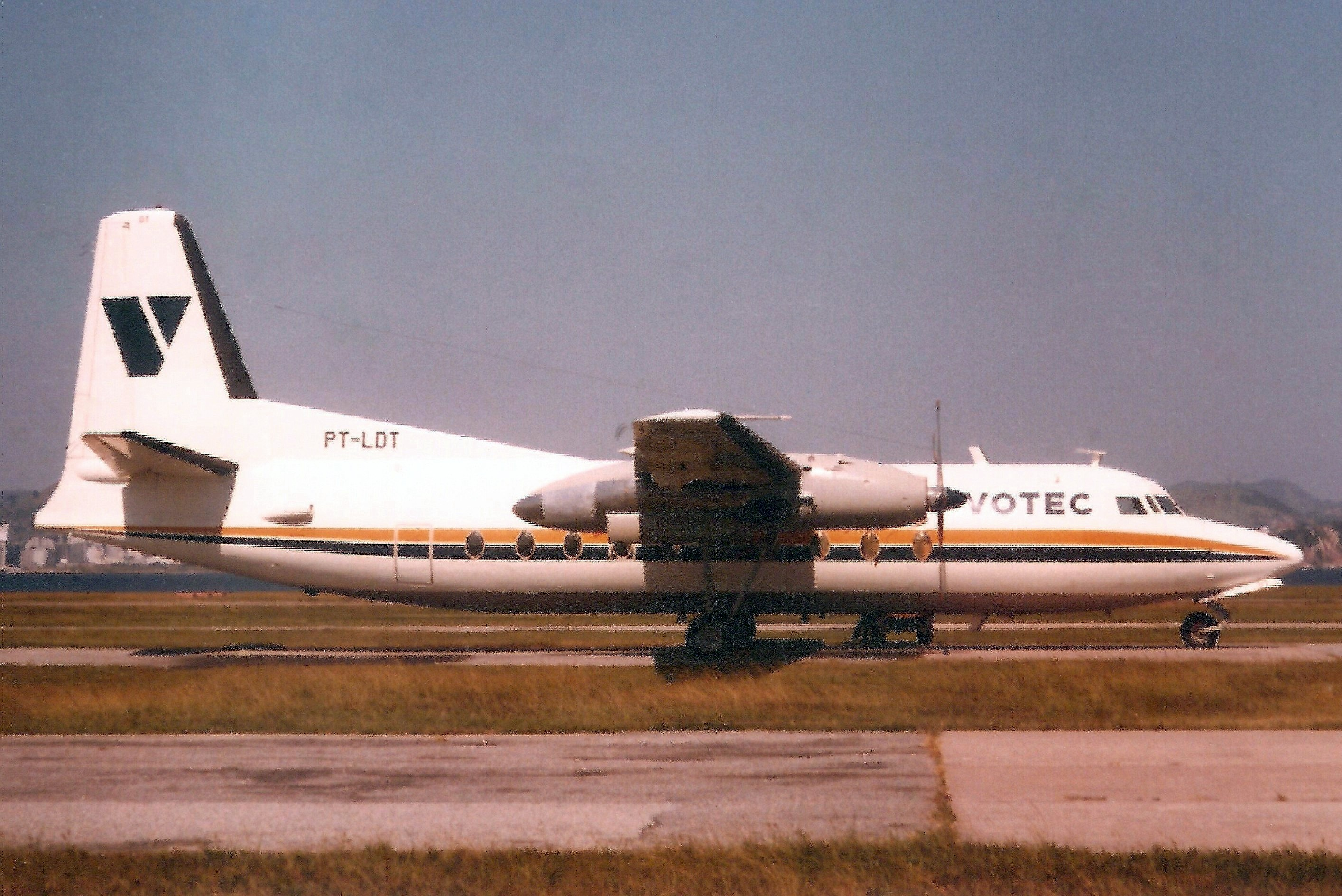
VOTEC Fokker F27 Friendship

VOTEC (Voos Tecnicos e Executivos) was originally an air taxi company established in 1966 by Klaus Richard Hoelck. On February 17, 1976 the identity of VOTEC Táxi Aéreo was changed to VOTEC Serviços Aéreos Regionais S/A, a regional airline authorized to operate scheduled services. This airline grew quickly and in 1978 it served dozens of cities, operated off-shore air services on behalf of Petrobras, and mail services on behalf of Brazilian Post.

In 1983 administration problems started, which eventually led to the reduction of the fleet to only three Fokker F27 in 1985, and finally, in January 1986, to the end of regular services.

Sensing a good opportunity for growth on a still much regulated market, in June 1986 TAM – Transportes Aéreos Regionais (IATA code KK) acquired VOTEC, which was then renamed Brasil Central Linhas Aéreas. TAM and Brasil Central were both regional airlines and operated in different designated areas. They however operated as a consortium with integrated networks and fleet, with the most notable differences being the flight number IATA codes (whereas TAM had the IATA code KK, Brasil Central operated with the code JJ inherited from VOTEC), the different aircraft color schemes, and their designated areas of operation.

On May 15, 1990, the Brazilian Government lifted restrictions of operational areas of regional airlines allowing them to fly anywhere in Brazil. As a consequence, Brasil Central was renamed TAM – Transportes Aéreos Meridionais, acquired the same color scheme of TAM (KK) but still maintained the IATA code JJ.

In 2000 TAM (KK) was merged into TAM (JJ) and TAM (JJ) was renamed TAM Transportes Aéreos. The code JJ was maintained and the code KK was released back to IATA.

Even though the line VOTEC/Brasil Central/TAM Meridionais (JJ) is technically the original line into which TAM Regionais (KK) was merged into, historically it is considered just the opposite, because TAM Regionais was culturally the airline which gave identity to the new entity born from the merger. Actually, the only remaining asset of the original airline is the IATA code.

== Destinations ==
VOTEC/Brasil Central/TAM Meridionais served the following cities:

- Aragarças
- Araguaína – Araguaína Airport
- Araxá – Romeu Zema Airport
- Arraias – Arraias Airport
- Balsas
- Barra do Corda
- Barreirinhas – Barreirinhas Airport
- Belém – Val de Cães/Júlio Cezar Ribeiro International Airport
- Belo Horizonte – Pampulha/Carlos Drummond de Andrade Airport
- Brasília – Pres. Juscelino Kubitschek International Airport
- Campo Alegre de Goiás
- Canarana – Canarana Airport
- Cândido Mendes
- Carolina – Brig. Lysias Augusto Rodrigues Airport
- Carutapera
- Conceição do Araguaia – Conceição do Araguaia Airport
- Cuiabá – Marechal Rondon International Airport
- Cururupu
- Dianópolis
- Goiânia – Santa Genoveva Airport
- Grajaú
- Guimarães
- Imperatriz – Pref. Renato Moreira Airport
- Ituiutaba
- Itumbiara
- Marabá – Marabá Airport
- Nova Xavantina
- Parnaíba – Prefeito Dr. João Silva Filho International Airport
- Passos
- Pinheiro
- Poços de Caldas – Poços de Caldas Airport
- Porto Nacional – Porto Nacional Airport
- Rio de Janeiro – Santos Dumont Airport
- São Bento
- São José do Xingu
- São Luís – Marechal Cunha Machado International Airport
- São Miguel do Araguaia
- São Paulo – Congonhas Airport
- São Simão
- Santa Isabel do Morro
- Santa Terezinha, Mato Grosso – Santa Terezinha Airport
- Suiá-miçu
- Tucuruí – Tucuruí Airport
- Turiaçu
- Tutóia
- Uberaba – Mário de Almeida Franco Airport
- Uberlândia – Ten. Cel. Av. César Bombonato Airport

== Fleet ==
VOTEC, Brasil Central, and Tam Meridional fleets
Aircraft	Total	Years of operation	Notes
Britten-Norman BN-2A Islander	2	1976-1983	
Embraer EMB 110 Bandeirante	11	1976–1986	
Douglas DC-3/C-47	5	1979-1985	
Fokker F27 MK 200/600	3	1982–	
Cessna 208A Caravan I			

== Airline affinity program ==
VOTEC did not have an airline affinity program. Brasil Central and TAM Meridional were part of TAM Regional Frequent Flyer program Programa Fidelidade.

== Accidents and incidents ==
=== Accidents (as VOTEC) ===
- 30 March 1980: a Britten Norman BN-2A-9 Islander registration PT-JSC stalled and crashed upon take-off of Cuiabá. All 9 occupants died.
- 24 February 1981: an Embraer EMB110P Bandeirante registration PT-GLB flying from Tucuruí to Belém-Val de Cans collided with a ship in dry dock while approaching Belém in rain and high winds. The aircraft subsequently struck two barges and broke in two. The front part crashed onto a tug, and the tail section sank. Only 3 passengers of a total of 14 passengers and crew survived.
- 18 April 1984: two Embraer EMB 110 Bandeirante registrations PT-GJZ and PT-GKL collided on air, while on approach to land at Imperatriz. PT-GJZ was flying from São Luís to Imperatriz and crashed on ground killing all of its 18 passengers and crew. PT-GKL was flying from Belém-Val de Cans to Imperatriz and its pilot was able to make an emergency landing on Tocantins river. One passenger of its 17-passenger and crew died.

=== Incident (as TAM Meridional) ===
- 26 August 1993: a Cessna 208A Caravan I registration PT-OGN was hijacked and set on fire after landing at Sinop. There were no victims.

== See also ==
- TAM Linhas Aéreas
