= Paraense =

Paraense may refer to:

- A person or thing from the state of Pará, in northern Brazil
- Campeonato Paraense, a Brazilian state football league
- Guilherme Paraense, a Brazilian sport shooter
- Paraense Transportes Aéreos, a Brazilian airline
