= Belém Air Force Base =

Air base of the Brazilian Air Force

- Base Aérea de Belém
- Belém, Pará in Brazil

Site information
- Type: Air Force Base
- Code: ALA9
- Owner: Brazilian Air Force
- Controlled by: Brazilian Air Force
- Open to the public: No
- Website: www.fab.mil.br/organizacoes/mostra/511

Location
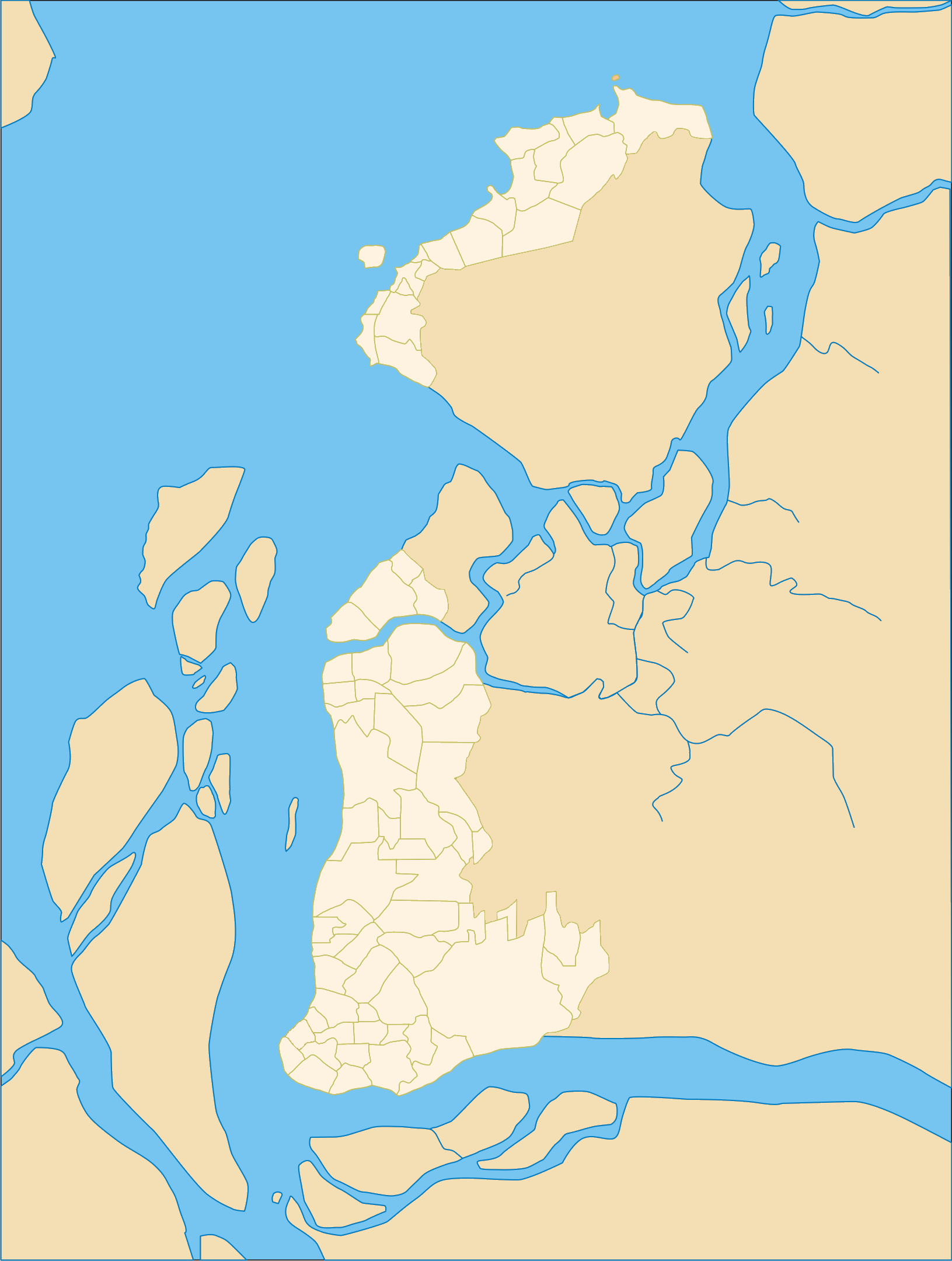
- Location in Brazil SBBE (Pará) SBBE (Brazil)
- Coordinates: 01°23′05″S 048°28′44″W

Site history
- Built: 1938
- In use: 1944-present

Garrison information
- Current commander: Cel. Av. Ricardo Bevilaqua Mendes
- Occupants: 1st Squadron of the 3rd Aviation Group; 1st Squadron of Air Transportation; 1st Squadron of Helicopters for General Use in the North of the Brazilian Navy

Airfield information
- Identifiers: IATA: BEL, ICAO: SBBE, LID: PA0001
- Elevation: 17 metres (56 ft) AMSL
Runways
Direction	Length and surface
06/24	2,800 metres (9,186 ft) Asphalt
02/20	1,830 metres (6,004 ft) Asphalt

Base Aérea de Belém – ALA9 (IATA: BEL, ICAO: SBBE) is a base of the Brazilian Air Force, located in Belém, Brazil.

It shares some facilities with Val-de-Cans/Júlio Cezar Ribeiro International Airport.

== History ==
Belém Air Force Base has its origins on the 7th Aviation Regiment created on 30 June 1936. The provisory facility was located in the neighborhood ou Souza and it was only in 1938 that the construction of an aerodrome in the neighborhood of Val-de-Cans begun. The Air Force Base was created on 21 August 1944 by Decree 6,814.

Starting in 1958, with the creation of the Correio Aéreo Nacional da Amazônia in Belém, an Air Force organization focused in integration and humanitarian services, the Base gained vital importance as a base for the integration of the Amazonian region with the rest of the country.

== Units ==
The following units are based at Belém Air Force Base:

- 1st Squadron of the 3rd Aviation Group (3°/7°GAv) Netuno, using the P-95BM Bandeirulha.
- 1st Squadron of Air Transportation (1°ETA) Tracajá, using the C-95BM & CM Bandeirante, C-97 Brasília, and the C-98A Grand Caravan.
- 1st Squadron of Helicopters for General Use in the North of the Brazilian Navy (HU41) Hipogrifo, using the UH-15 Super Cougar.

== Access ==
The base is located 12 km from downtown Belém.

== Gallery ==
This gallery displays aircraft that are or have been based at Belém. The gallery is not comprehensive.

=== Present aircraft ===
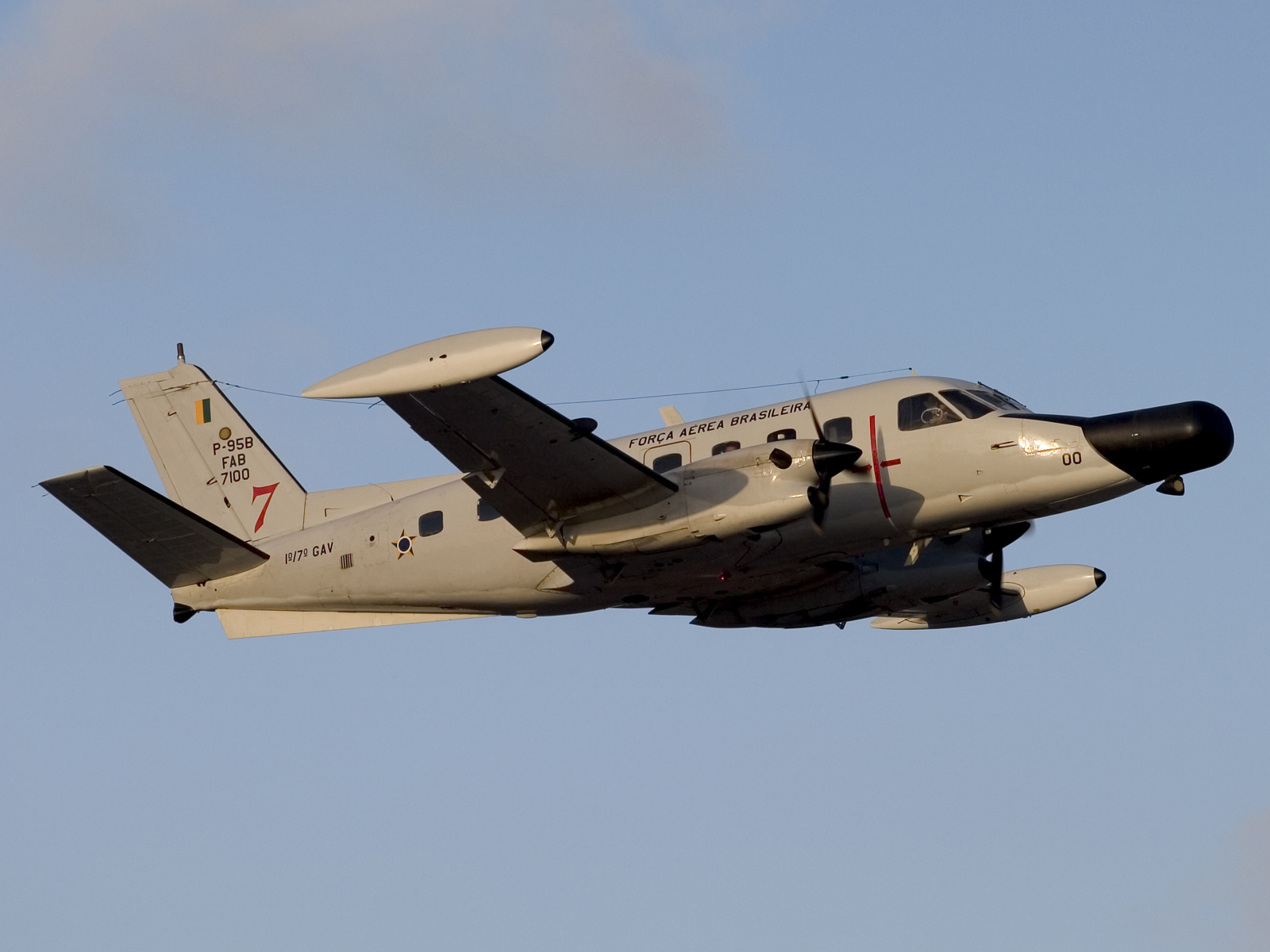
Embraer P-95B Bandeirulha (FAB)

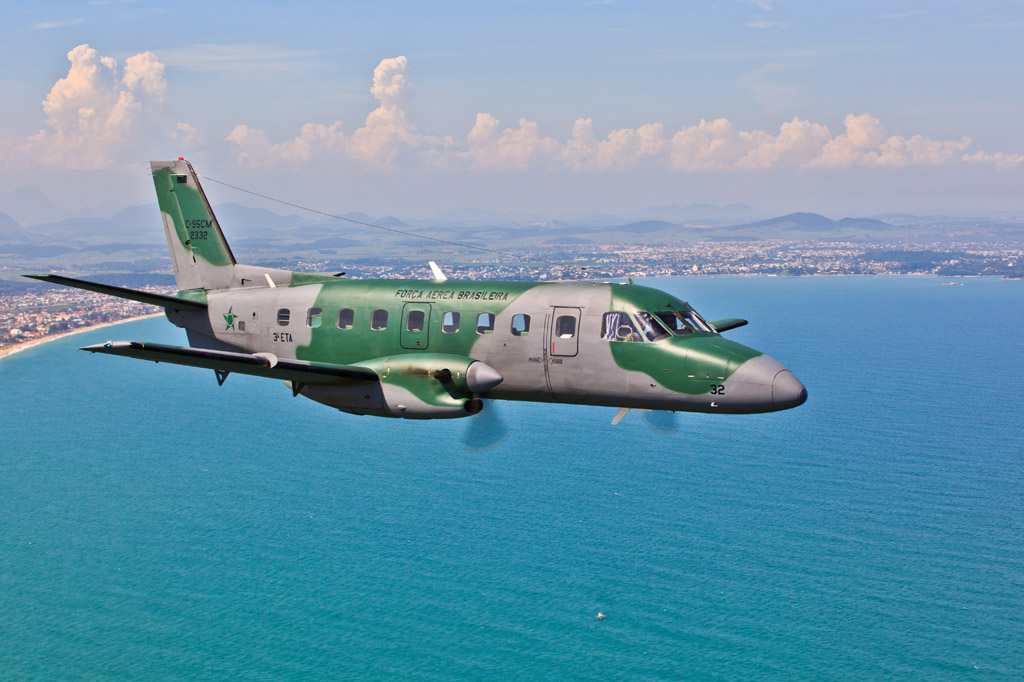
Embraer C-95B Bandeirante (FAB)

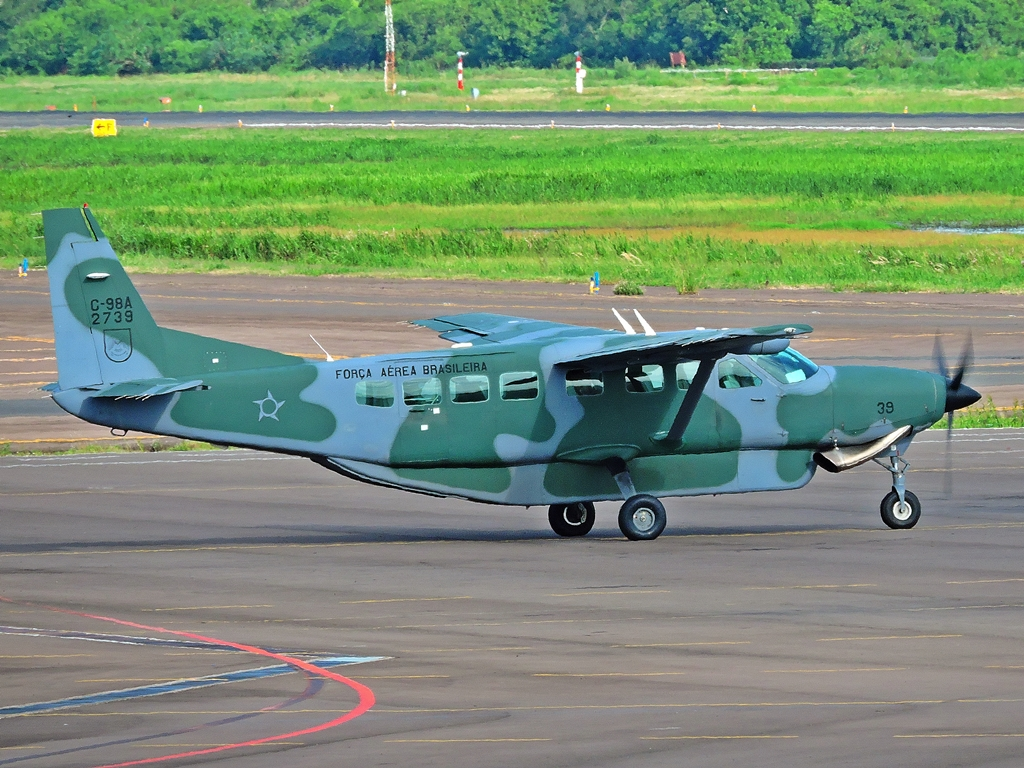
Cessna C-98A Caravan (FAB)

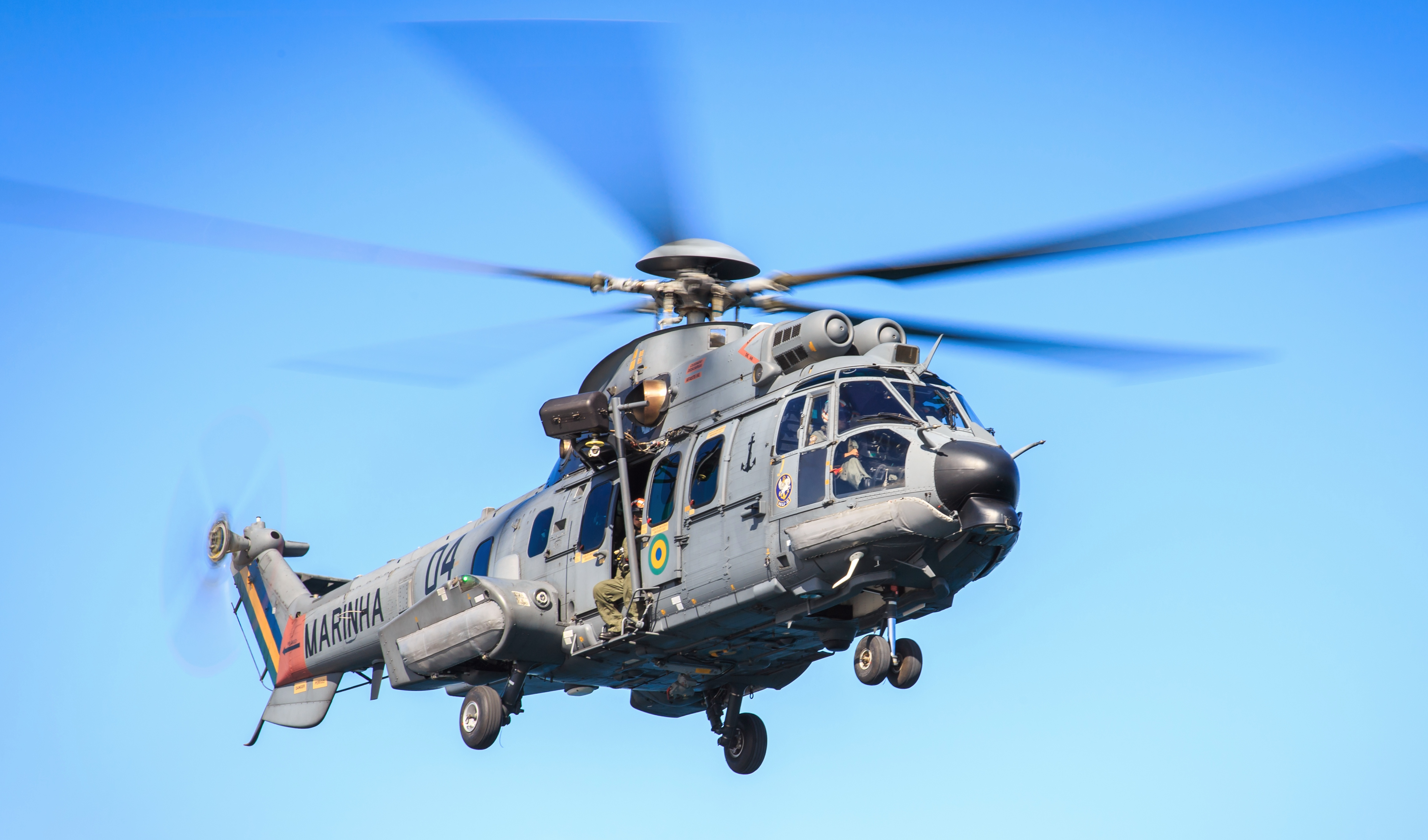
Helibras UH-15 Super Cougar (Navy)

=== Retired aircraft ===
Consolidated CA-10 Catalina (FAB)

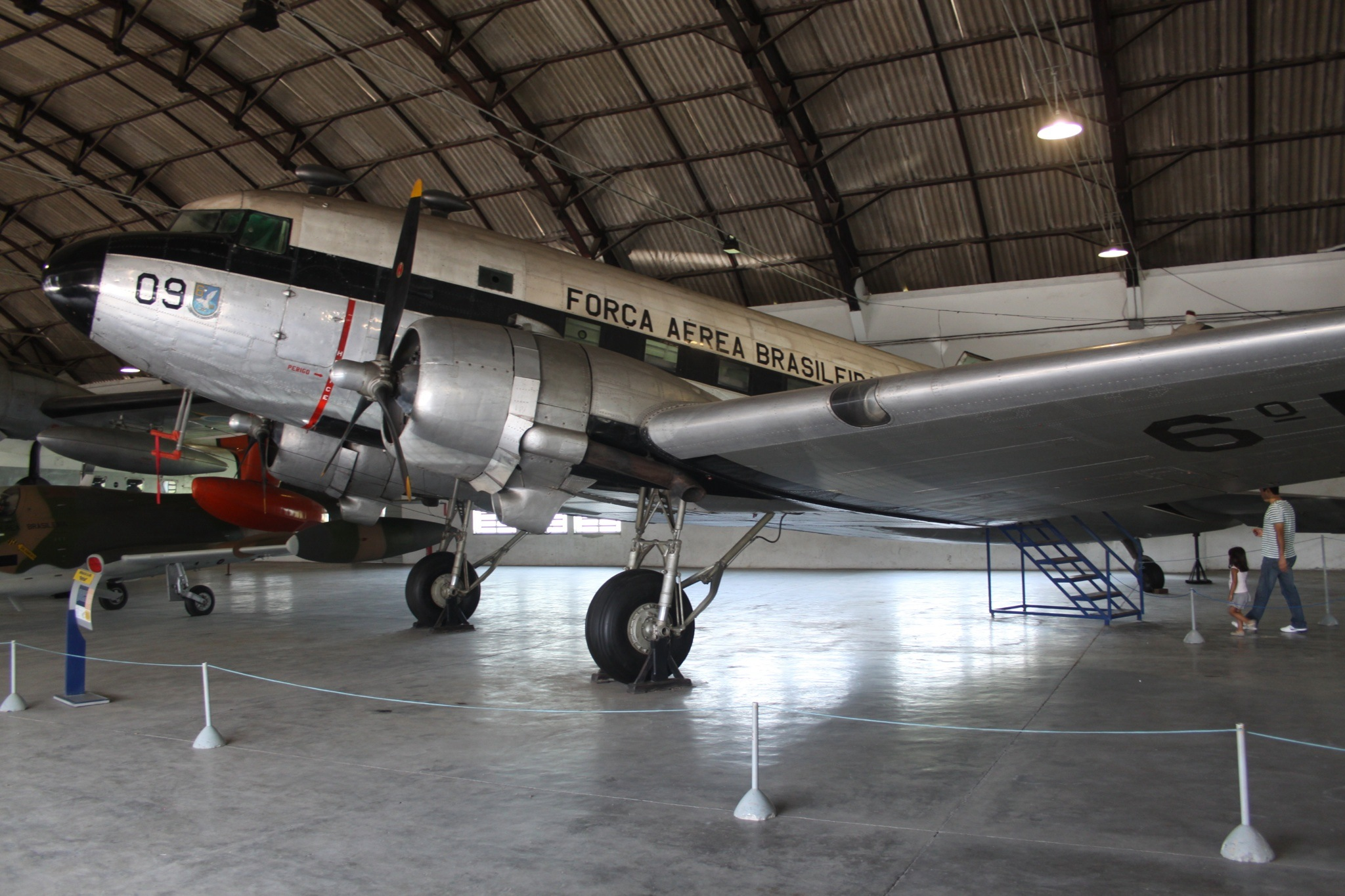
Douglas C-47 Dakota (FAB)

== See also ==
- List of Brazilian military bases
- Val-de-Cans/Júlio Cezar Ribeiro International Airport
