= Paraense Transportes Aéreos =

Brazilian airline

IATA	ICAO	Call sign
QR	—	—
- Founded: 1952
- Ceased operations: 1970
- Headquarters: Belém, Brazil
- Key people: Antônio Alves Ramos Junior

Paraense Transportes Aéreos was a Brazilian airline founded in 1952. It ceased operations in 1970.

== History ==
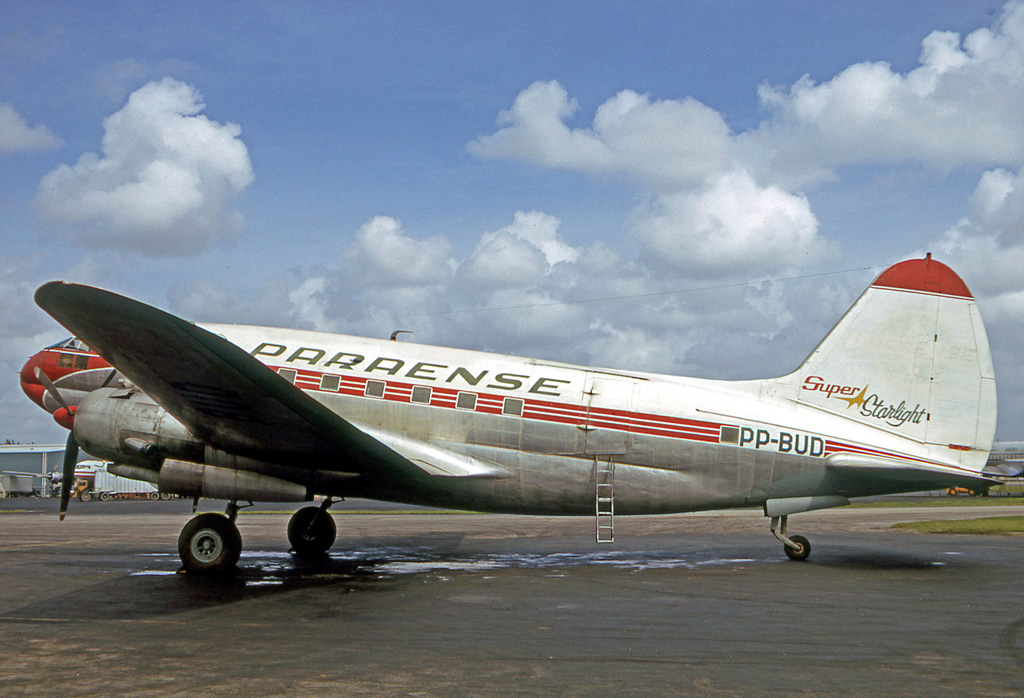
A Curtiss C-46 Commando at Miami in 1970

Paraense Transportes Aéreos was a Brazilian airline which was founded on February 18, 1952 by Antônio Alves Affonso Ramos Junior and made its maiden flight on March 30 of the same year, using a Consolidated PBY-5A Catalina.

Regular passenger and cargo flights started in 1957 using a Curtiss C-46 to fly from Belém to Rio de Janeiro via Pedro Afonso, Cristalândia and Brasília. In fact, Paraense was one of the first airlines to have regular services to Brasília, the new Brazilian capital, inaugurated in 1960. In 1960 it started the route São Paulo, Cuiabá, Porto Velho, Rio Branco.

It had serious maintenance problems and after a series of accidents, particularly the one of March 14, 1970, all aircraft were grounded. On May 29, 1970, Paraense ceased operations.

== Fleet ==
Paraense Transportes Aéreos fleet
Aircraft	Total	Years of operation	Notes
Consolidated PBY-5A/6A Catalina	3	1952–1959	
Curtiss C-46/Super C-46 Commando	19	1957–1970	
Douglas DC-4	5	1962–1970	
Douglas DC-3/C-47	2	1962–1970	
Fairchild Hiller FH-227B	6	1967–1970	

== Accidents and incidents ==
Accidents involving fatalities

- 31 May 1958: a cargo Curtiss C-46D-15-CU Commando registration PP-BTB crashed shortly after take-off from Rio de Janeiro-Santos Dumont of unknown causes. The crew of 4 died.
- 6 May 1959: a Curtiss C-46/Super C-46 Commando registration PP-BTA crashed shortly after take-off from Belém-Val de Cans. Three crew members died.
- 22 September 1960: a Curtiss C-46/Super C-46 Commando registration PP-BTF crashed shortly after take-off from Belém-Val de Cans. Seven occupants died.
- 12 August 1965: a Curtiss C-46A-50-CU Commando registration PP-BTH en route to Cuiabá caught fire and crashed on the location of Buracão, close do Barra do Bugre, in the State of Mato Grosso. All 13 passengers and crew died.
- 27 March 1968: Douglas C-47A PP-BTX was damaged beyond economic repair at an unknown location in Brazil.
- 14 March 1970: a Fairchild Hiller FH-227B registration PP-BUF operating flight 903 from São Luiz to Belém-Val de Cans, while on final approach to land, crashed into Guajará Bay. Of the 40 passengers and crew, 3 survived.

== See also ==
- List of defunct airlines of Brazil
