= Imperatriz Airport =

Imperatriz–Prefeito Renato Moreira Airport Aeroporto de Imperatriz–Prefeito Renato Moreira

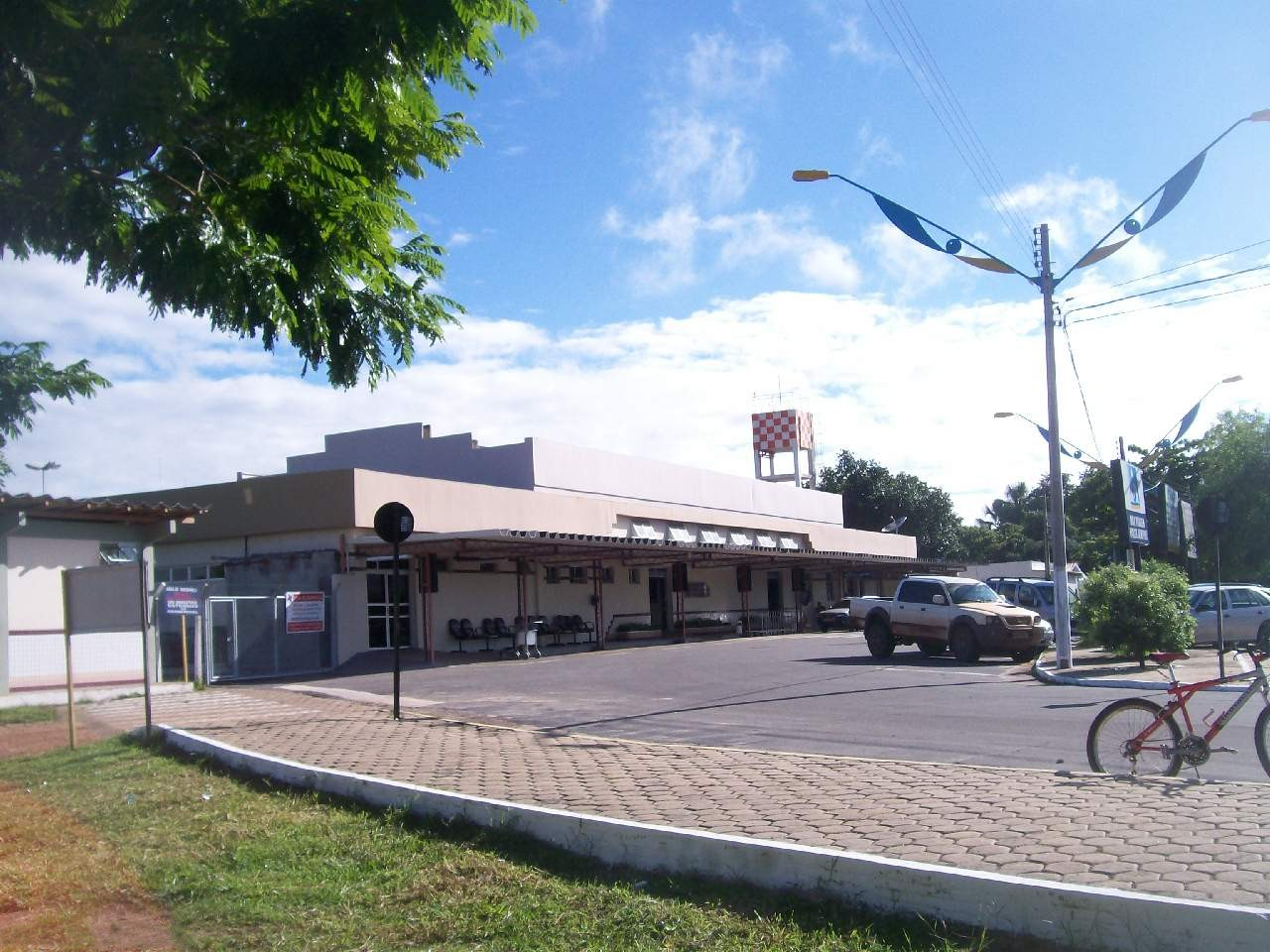
- IATA: IMP; ICAO: SBIZ; LID: MA0002

Summary
- Airport type: Public
- Operator: Infraero (1980–2021); Motiva (2021–2026); ASUR (2026–present)
- Serves: Imperatriz
- Time zone: BRT (UTC−03:00)
- Elevation AMSL: 131 m (430 ft)
- Coordinates: 05°31′50″S 047°27′30″W
- Website: aeroportos.motiva.com.br/imperatriz-ma/

Map
- Location in Brazil

Runways
Direction	Length		Surface
Direction	m	ft	Surface
07/25	1,798	5,899	Asphalt

Statistics (2025)
- Passengers: 337,950 ▲6%
- Aircraft Operations: 5,925 ▲11%
- Statistics: Motiva; Sources: Airport Website, ANAC, DECEA

Imperatriz–Prefeito Renato Moreira Airport (IATA: IMP, ICAO: SBIZ) is the airport serving Imperatriz, Brazil. Since March 11, 2003 the airport is named after a former mayor of Imperatriz.

It is operated by ASUR.

== History ==
Imperatriz has a long tradition of air services, which started with at the end of the 1930s with Syndicato Condor using seaplanes which landed at Tocantins River.

At the end of World War II, the first airport with a 1,200m x 30m earth runway was operational but it was subject to flooding during the rainy season. Even so, Cruzeiro do Sul, Real-Aerovias and later Varig maintained regular operations to Imperatriz.

Around the end of the 1960s studies were made for a completely new facility and the site of the present airport was chosen. The airport was commissioned in 1973 at the same time that the older facility was closed. It was administered by Infraero between 1980 and 2021.

Previously operated by Infraero, on April 7, 2021 CCR won a 30-year concession to operate the airport. On April 26, 2025 CCR was rebranded as Motiva.

On November 18, 2025 the entire airports portfolio of Motiva was sold to the Mexican airport operator ASUR. Motiva will cease to operate airports. The transaction was completed on August 31, 2026.

== Airlines and destinations ==
Airlines	Destinations
Azul Brazilian Airlines	Belo Horizonte-Confins, São Luís
LATAM Brasil	Brasília, São Paulo–Guarulhos

== Accidents and incidents ==
- 18 April 1984: two VOTEC Embraer EMB 110 Bandeirante registrations PT-GJZ and PT-GKL collided on air, while on approach to land at Imperatriz. PT-GJZ was flying from São Luís to Imperatriz and crashed on ground killing all of its 18 passengers and crew. PT-GKL was flying from Belém-Val de Cans to Imperatriz and its pilot was able to make an emergency landing on Tocantins river. One passenger of its 17-passenger and crew died.

== Access ==
The airport is located 4 km (2 mi) from downtown Imperatriz.

== See also ==
- List of airports in Brazil
