= Ourilândia do Norte Airport =

Ourilândia do Norte Airport Aeroporto de Ourilândia do Norte
- IATA: OIA; ICAO: SDOW; LID: PA0021

Summary
- Airport type: Public
- Serves: Ourilândia do Norte
- Time zone: BRT (UTC−03:00)
- Elevation AMSL: 229 m (751 ft)
- Coordinates: 06°45′47″S 051°03′00″W

Map
- Location in Brazil OIA (Brazil)

Runways
Direction	Length		Surface
Direction	m	ft	Surface
14/32	1,200	3,938	Asphalt
- Sources: ANAC, DECEA

Ourilândia do Norte Airport (IATA: OIA, ICAO: SDOW) is the airport serving Ourilândia do Norte, Brazil.

== Airlines and destinations ==
Airlines	Destinations
Azul Conecta	Belém, Carajás

== Access ==
The airport is located 3 km (2 mi) from downtown Ourilândia do Norte.

== See also ==
- List of airports in Brazil
