= Arraias =

Municipality in Tocantins, Brazil

- Municipality
- Flag

- Location in Tocantins state

- Location in Brazil
- Coordinates: 12°55′51″S 46°56′16″W
- Country: Brazil
- Region: North
- State: Tocantins

Area
  - Total: 5,787 km^{2} (2,234 sq mi)

Population (2020)
  - Total: 10,534
  - Density: 1.820/km^{2} (4.715/sq mi)
- Time zone: UTC−3 (BRT)

Arraias is a municipality located in the Brazilian state of Tocantins. Its population was 10,534 (2020) and its area is 5,787 km^{2}.

The city is served by Arraias Airport.

== See also ==
- List of municipalities in Tocantins
