= Redenção, Pará =

Municipality in Pará, Brazil

Coordinates: 8°01′44″S 50°01′51″W

- Municipality
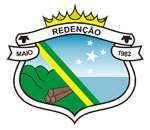
- Flag Coat of arms
- Nickname: RedeX City
- Location in the State of Pará
- Country: Brazil
- Region: Northern
- State: Pará
- Mesoregion: Sudeste Paraense

Government

Population (2020)
  - Total: 85,563
- Time zone: UTC−3 (BRT)
- <68550000>: 68550000
- Area code: 94
- Website: http://citybrazil.uol.com.br/pa/redencao

Redenção, Pará is a municipality in the state of Pará in the Northern region of Brazil.

The city is served by Redenção Airport.

== See also ==
- List of municipalities in Pará
