= Barreirinhas Airport =

Barreirinhas Lençóis Maranhenses Regional Airport Aeroporto Regional de Barreirinhas Lençóis Maranhenses

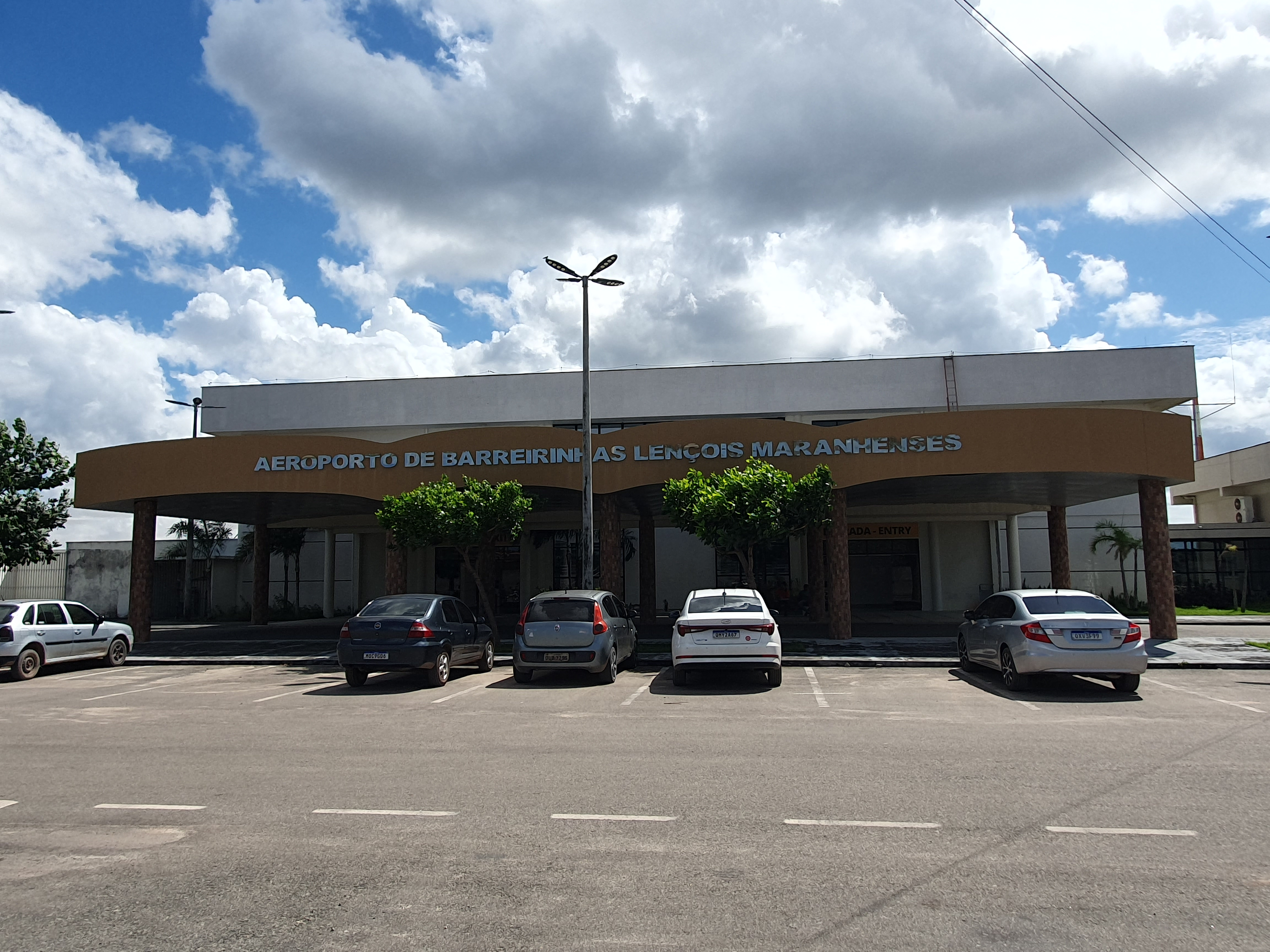
- Barreirinhas Airport terminal landside
- IATA: BRB; ICAO: SSRS; LID: MA0008

Summary
- Airport type: Public
- Operator: Esaero (?–2025); GRU Airport (2025–Present)
- Serves: Barreirinhas
- Opened: 19 November 2021; 4 years ago
- Time zone: BRT (UTC−03:00)
- Elevation AMSL: 12 m (39 ft)
- Coordinates: 02°45′24″S 042°48′12″W

Map
- Location in Brazil

Runways
Direction	Length		Surface
Direction	m	ft	Surface
11/29	1,500	4,921	Asphalt
- Source: ANAC, DECEA

Barreirinhas Lençóis Maranhenses Regional Airport (IATA: BRB, ICAO: SSRS) is the airport serving Barreirinhas, Brazil.

It is operated by GRU Airport.

== History ==
The airport was commissioned on November 19, 2021 as a replacement to an older facility which was then closed.

Previously operated by Esaero, on November 27, 2025 GRU Airport won the concession to operate the airport.

The airport is the main base for panoramic flights of the Lençóis Maranhenses National Park.

== Access ==
The airport is located 3 km (2 mi) from downtown Barreirinhas.

== Gallery ==
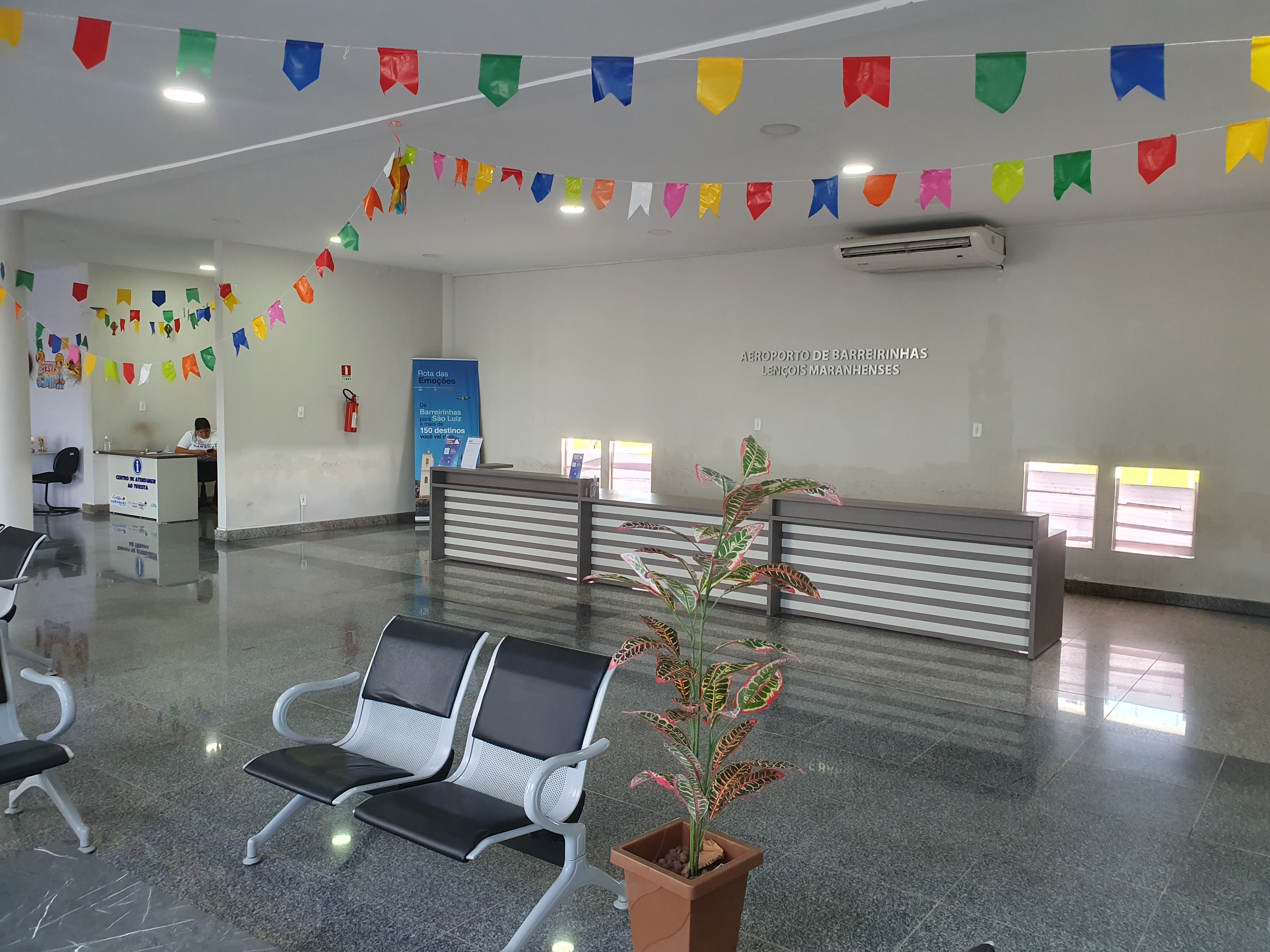
Barreirinhas Airport check-in hall

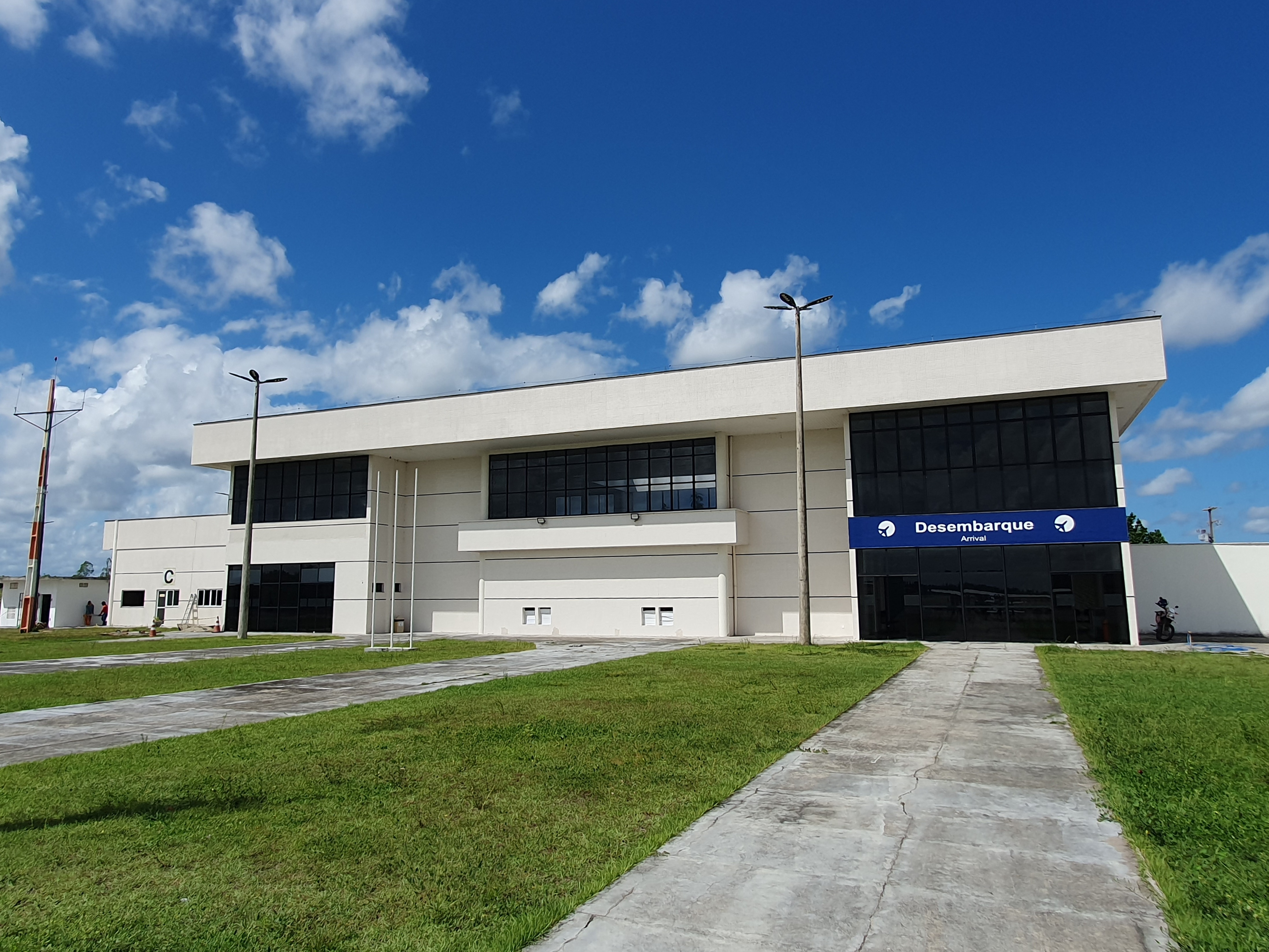
Barreirinhas Airport terminal airside

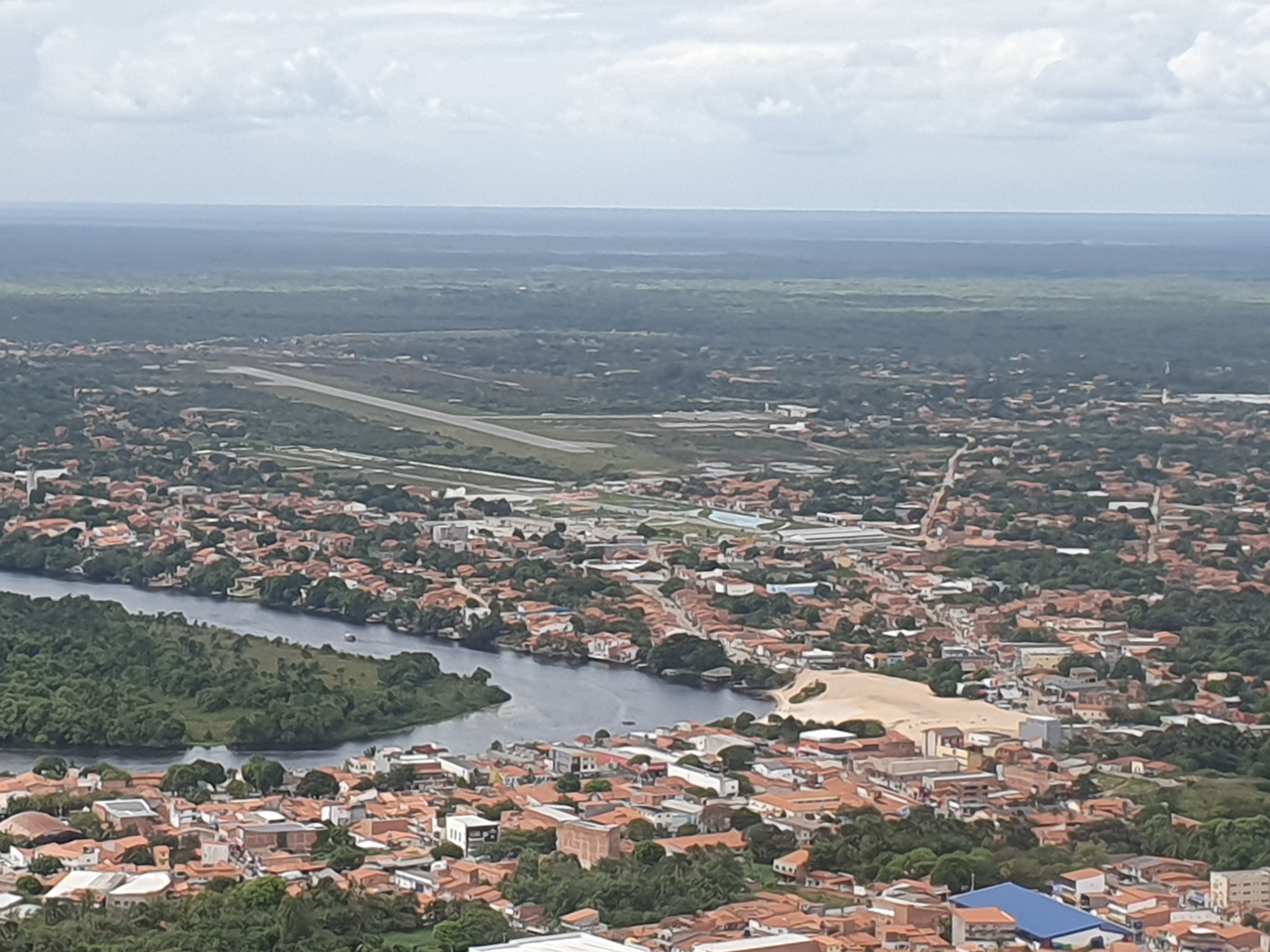
Barreirinhas Airport panoramic view

== See also ==
- List of airports in Brazil
