= Santana do Araguaia Airport =

Santana do Araguaia Airport Aeroporto de Santana do Araguaia
- IATA: CMP; ICAO: SD12; LID: PA0017

Summary
- Airport type: Private
- Serves: Santana do Araguaia
- Time zone: BRT (UTC−03:00)
- Elevation AMSL: 187 m (614 ft)
- Coordinates: 09°19′12″S 050°19′43″W

Map
- Location in Brazil CMP (Brazil)

Runways
Direction	Length		Surface
Direction	m	ft	Surface
01/19	1,400	4,593	Gravel
- Sources: ANAC, DECEA

Santana do Araguaia Airport (IATA: CMP, ICAO: SD12) formerly SNKE, is the airport serving Santana do Araguaia, Brazil.

== History ==
The airport was closed to air traffic on 30 March 2020.

The airport was reopened in 2025 as a private facility with the new 'ICAO' identifier: SD12.

== Access ==
The airport is located 3 km (2 mi) from downtown Santana do Araguaia.

== See also ==
- List of airports in Brazil
