= Arraias Airport =

Deputado Joaquim de d'Abreu Coelho Airport Aeroporto Deputado Joaquim d'Abreu Coelho
- IATA: AAI; ICAO: SWRA

Summary
- Airport type: Public
- Serves: Arraias
- Closed: 2016 (temporarily)
- Time zone: BRT (UTC−03:00)
- Elevation AMSL: 586 m (1,923 ft)
- Coordinates: 13°01′26″S 046°53′08″W

Map
- Location in Brazil

Runways
Direction	Length		Surface
Direction	m	ft	Surface
15/33	1,500	4,921	Asphalt

Deputado Joaquim d'Abreu Coelho Airport (IATA: AAI, ICAO: SWRA) is the airport serving Arraias, Brazil. It was closed in 2016.

== History ==
Part of the airport infrastructure was completed on August 5, 2013. However, on December 16, 2016 the operational license of the facility was revoked.

== Access ==
The airport is located 15 km (9 mi) south from downtown Arraias.

== See also ==
- List of airports in Brazil
