= Ourilândia do Norte =

Municipality in Pará, Brazil

- Municipality
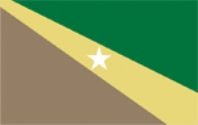
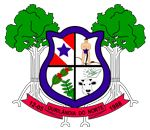
- Flag Coat of arms

- Location of Ourilândia do Norte in the State of Pará

- Location in Brazil
- Coordinates: 6°45′18″S 51°05′02″W
- Country: Brazil
- Region: Northern
- State: Pará
- Mesoregion: Sudeste Paraense

Population (2020)
  - Total: 33,335
- Time zone: UTC−3 (BRT)
- Website: Official website

Ourilândia do Norte is a municipality in the state of Pará in the Northern region of Brazil.

The city is served by Ourilândia do Norte Airport.

== See also ==
- List of municipalities in Pará
