= Santana do Araguaia =

- Municipality
- Flag Coat of arms

- Location of Santana do Araguaia
- Coordinates: 09°30′18″S 50°37′30″W
- Country: Brazil
- Region: Norte
- State: Pará

Government
  - Mayor: Eduardo Alves Conti (MDB)

Area
  - Total: 11,591.452 km^{2} (4,475.485 sq mi)
- Elevation: 160 m (520 ft)

Population (2020)
  - Total: 74,419
  - Density: 3.7/km^{2} (9.6/sq mi)
- Time zone: UTC−3 (BRT)
- Postal code (CEP): 68560
- HDI (2000): 0.690 – medium

Santana do Araguaia is the southernmost city in the Brazilian state of Pará. The city lies near the Araguaia River, which marks the border with the state of Tocantins and Mato Grosso. The town was established on December 20, 1961, by then-governor of Pará, Aurélio do Carmo, after being split off from the municipality of Conceição do Araguaia.

The city is served by Santana do Araguaia Airport.
