= Barreirinhas =

- Municipality
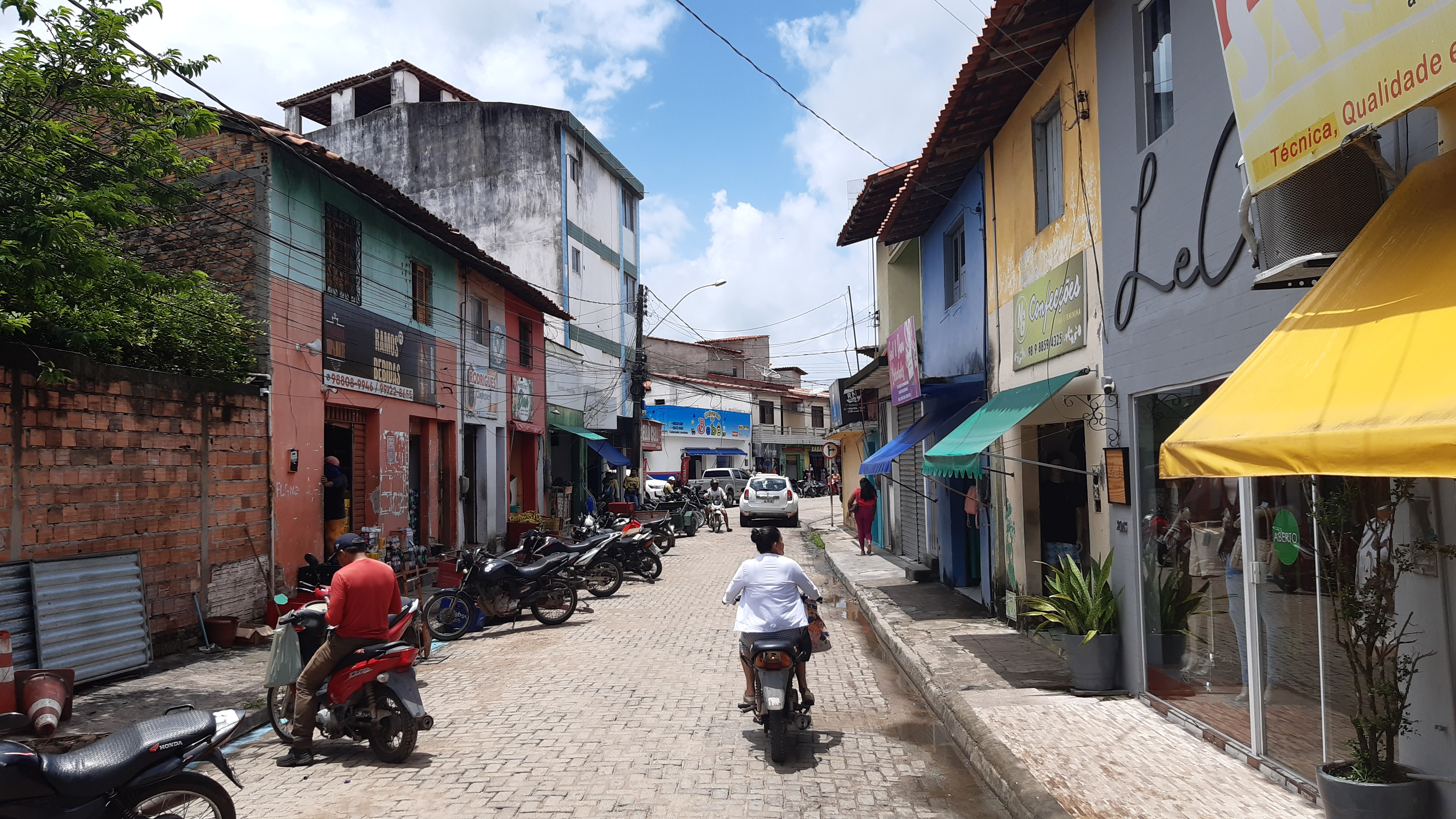
- Typical street in the town (2024)

- Flag Coat of arms
- Interactive map of Barreirinhas
- Coordinates: 2°45′S 42°50′W
- Country: Brazil
- Region: Nordeste
- State: Maranhão
- Mesoregion: Norte Maranhense

Population (2020)
  - Total: 63,217
- Time zone: UTC−3 (BRT)

Barreirinhas is a municipality in the state of Maranhão in the Northeast region of Brazil.

The municipality contains part of the 1,535,310-hectare (3,793,800-acre) Upaon-Açu/Miritiba/Alto Preguiças Environmental Protection Area, created in 1992.

Barreirinhas is the starting point for most trips to the Lençóis Maranhenses National Park.

== Transport ==
The locality is served by the Barreirinhas Airport.

== See also ==
- List of municipalities in Maranhão
