= Redenção Airport =

Redenção Airport Aeroporto de Redenção
- IATA: RDC; ICAO: SNDC; LID: PA0030

Summary
- Airport type: Public
- Serves: Redenção
- Time zone: BRT (UTC−03:00)
- Elevation AMSL: 207 m (679 ft)
- Coordinates: 08°01′52″S 049°58′47″W

Map
- Location in Brazil RDC (Brazil)

Runways
Direction	Length		Surface
Direction	m	ft	Surface
06/24	1,350	4,429	Asphalt
- Sources: ANAC, DECEA

Redenção Airport (IATA: RDC, ICAO: SNDC) is the airport serving Redenção, Brazil.

== Access ==
The airport is located 6 km (4 mi) from downtown Redenção.

== See also ==
- List of airports in Brazil
