= Tucuruí =

Tucuruí Alcobaça
- Municipality
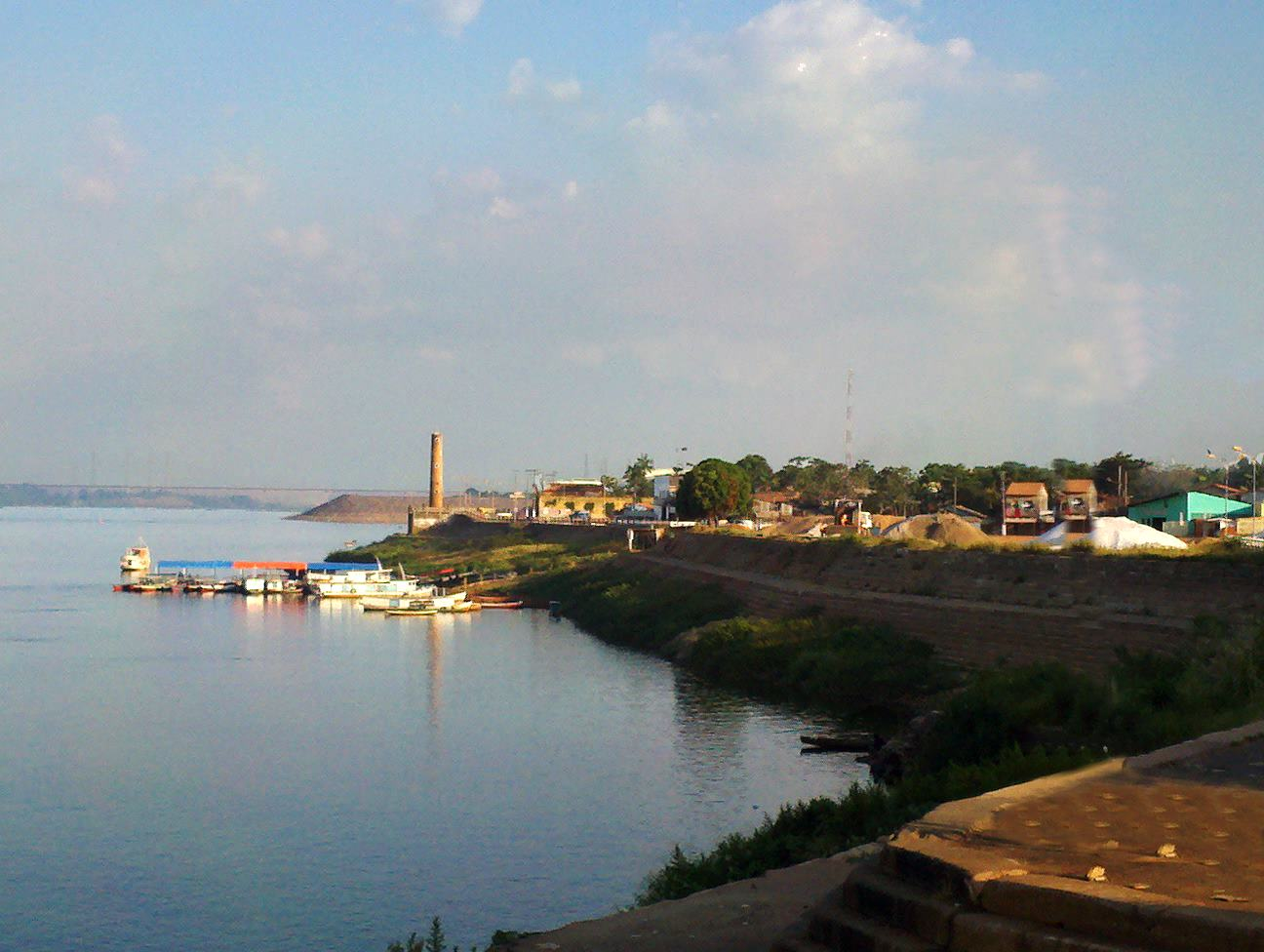

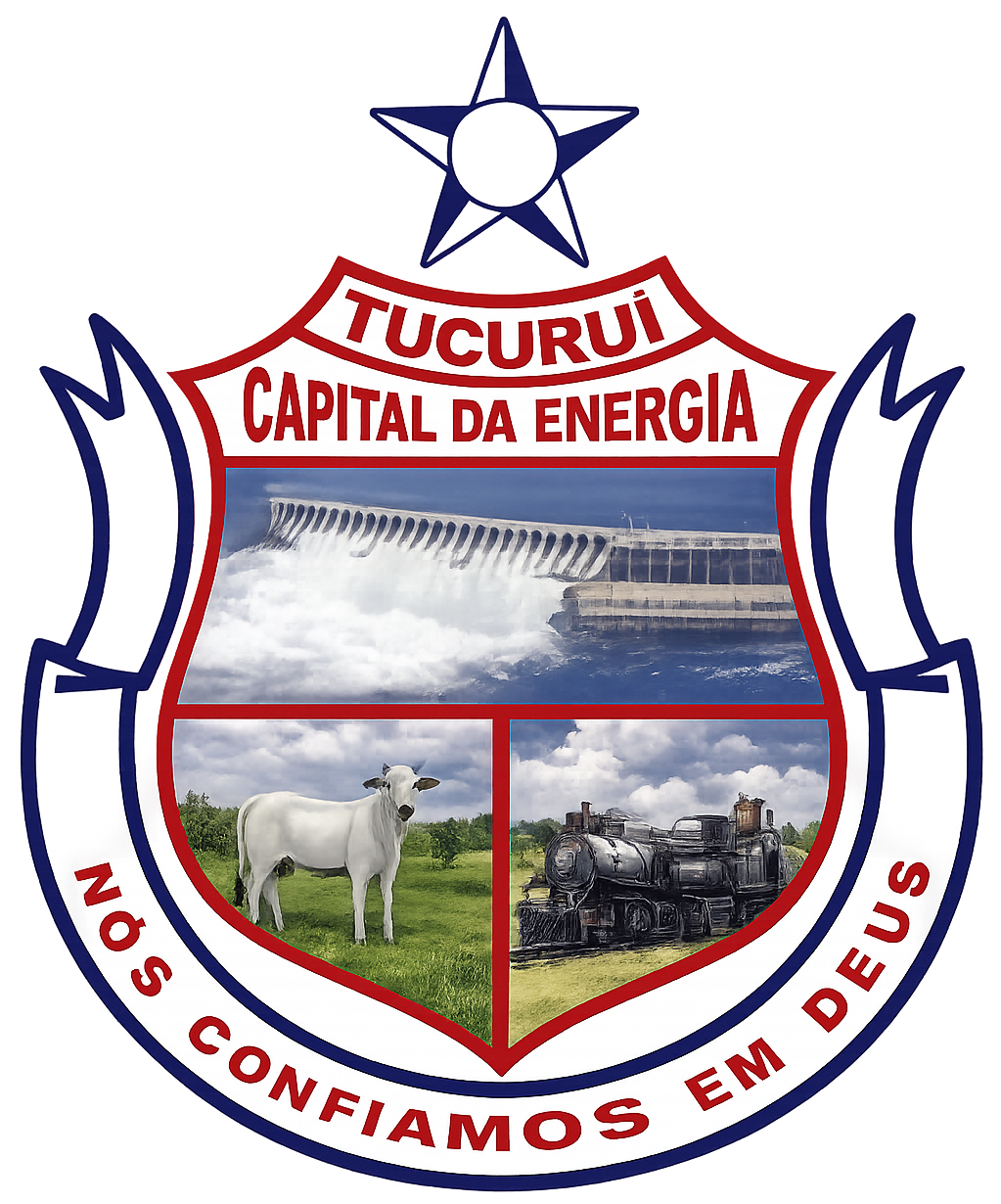
- Flag Coat of arms
- Nickname: Capital of Energy
- Location in the State Para

- Location in Brazil
- Coordinates: 03°46′04″S 49°40′22″W
- Country: Brazil
- Region: Northern
- State: Pará
- Mesoregion: Sudeste Paraense
- Emancipation: December 31, 1947
- Founded: 1779

Government
  - Mayor: Alexandre Siqueira (MDB, (2025-2028) (Brazil)

Area
  - Total: 2,086.17 km^{2} (805.47 sq mi)

Population (2020)
  - Total: 115,144
  - Density: 55.1940/km^{2} (142.952/sq mi)
- Time zone: UTC−3 (BRT)

Tucuruí is a municipality in the state of Pará in the Northern region of Brazil.

The city is served by Tucuruí Airport.

The name Tucuruí is a Tupi word that means "river of ants" or "river of locusts". It is the concatenation of two Tupi words: tukura (ants, locusts) and 'y (water). The city is very famous because of its colossal Dam, the Tucuruí Dam which is administered by Eletrobrás Eletronorte – the constructor company of this large infrastructure project.

== Economy ==
Currently, Tucuruí city's economy is based on agriculture and general commerce. During its 60 years the commerce activity varied a lot. In the beginning there was a railroad for draining out the production of the Brazil Nut (known in Brazil as "Pará's Nut"), a very abundant available product in the region. The Tucuruí Dam developed the municipality and brought large industries for the region.

== Tourism ==
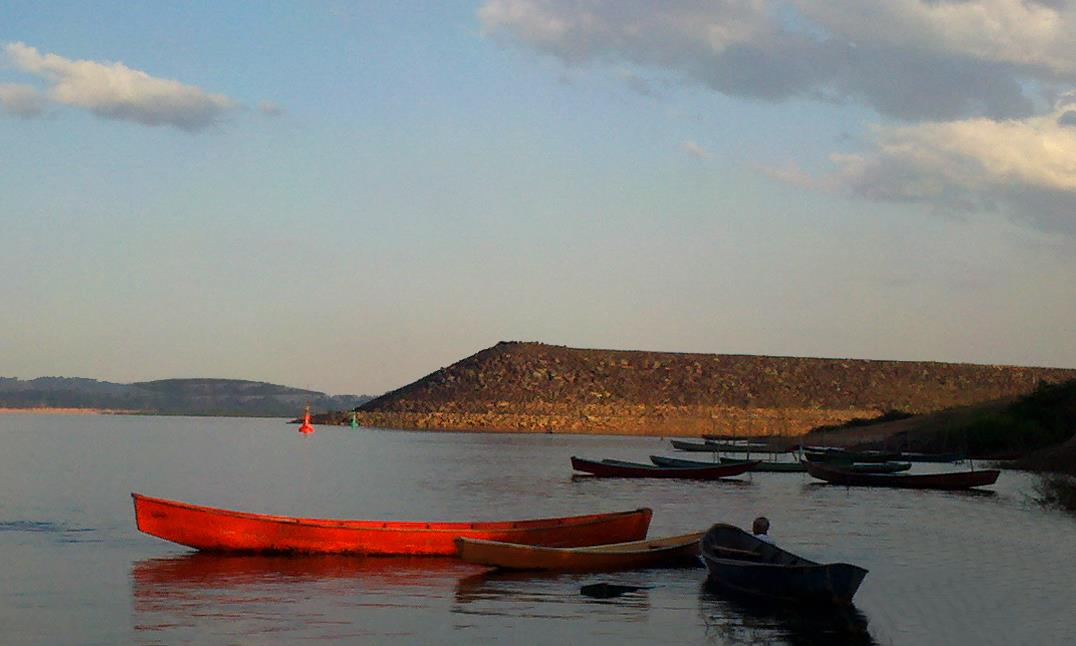
Boats in Tucuruí. In the background: the Tucuruí Sluice.

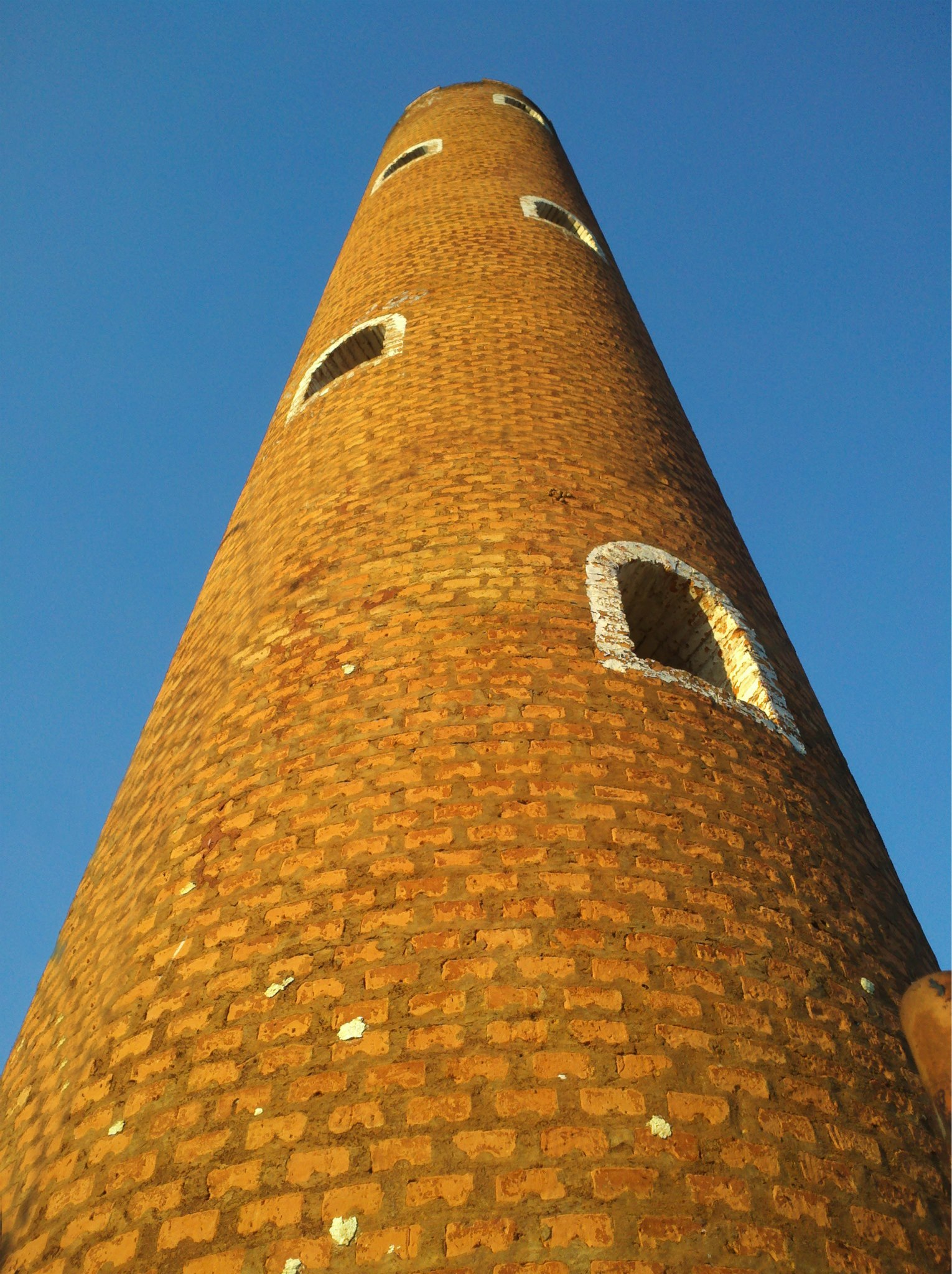
The lighthouse in Tucuruí's pier. It was used a long time ago to signal the navigation through the rocks in the river

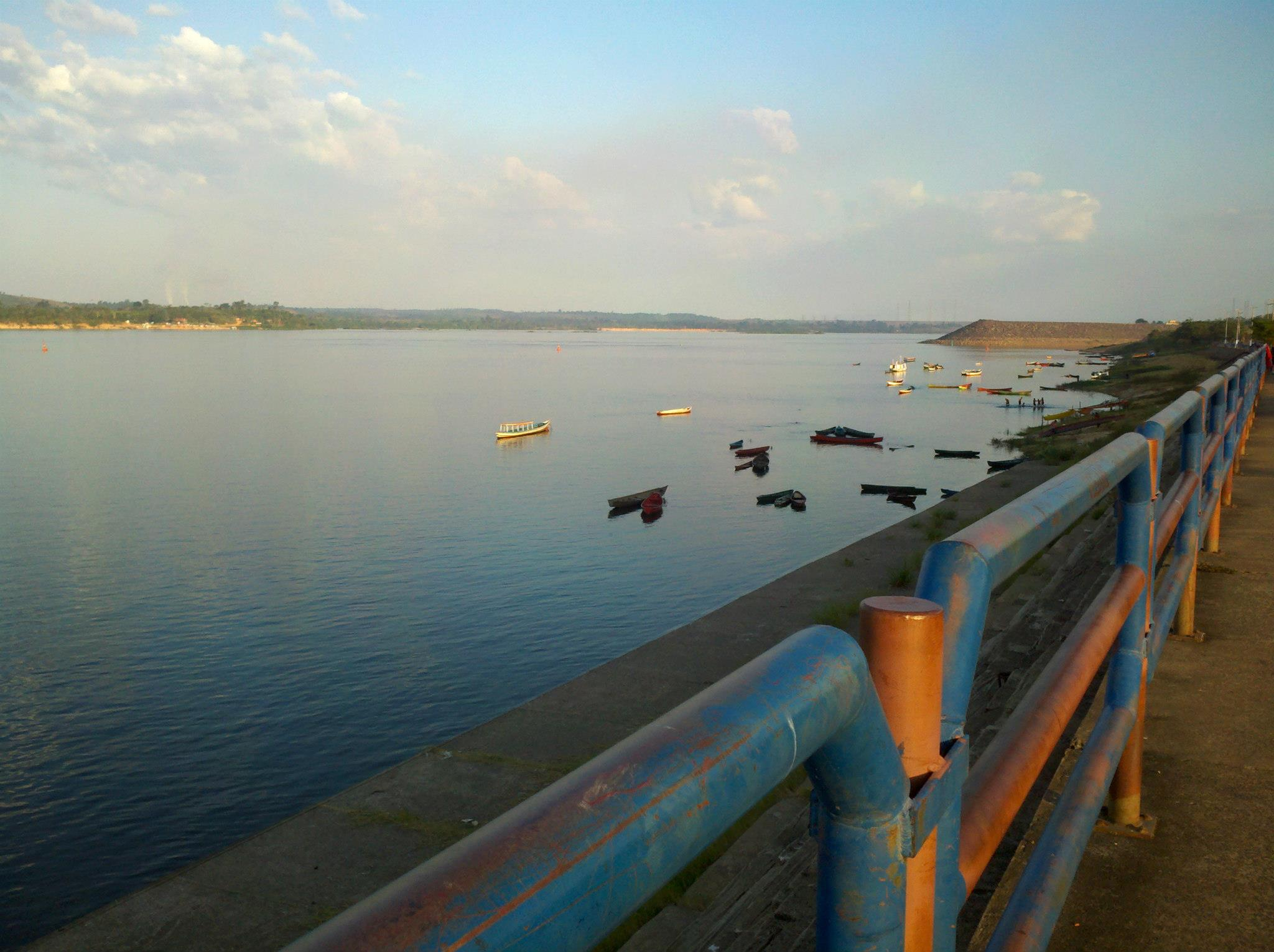
This is the Tocantins River in Tucuruí.

In Tucuruí, you can explore the dam lake, one of the largest artificial lakes ever made by man. It has 74.6 meters (245 ft) of depth and more than 2.500 kilometers (1.553 mi) of total extension. You can visit islands, fishing Cichla or Tambaqui and see natural beauties that you can only find in Amazon. The historical site of city has old buildings and the Museum of Extinct Railroad - the historical museum with many pictures and objects from the city's beginning. There is a train that was used in the period of Brazil Nut that was restored and placed in front of the Eletrobás Eletronorte Cultural Center. Inside the Cultural Center, visits to the inside the hydroelectric dam to see its workings are scheduled. In February, there is the Tucuruí carnival party, one of the most known in region. In June, there is the Tucunaré's festival (Cichla Festival), when traditional preparations of fish are served.

== Gastronomy ==
Tucuruí has a privileged lake with many species of fish. Naturally, the local gastronomy has much fish in it. The most known is the Peixe no Saco (Fish in the Bag). The Peixe no Saco is a preparation of Chichla or Tambaqui with a wide variety of spices and herbs placed within the fish's stomach. The fish is then placed on a special waterproof bag with soy sauce and roasted in oven or in firewood.

Other gastronomic options include indigenous food. There is the Tacacá (a broth made of tucupi, jambu [a native variety of paracress], starch and shrimp served in a gourd usually to drink without spoon or fork. There is just a toothpick for eating the shrimp and the herbs) and the Vatapá and maniçoba.

== Airport ==
Tucuruí airport is located about 10 km (6.2 mi) far from the city. It is currently only served by Azul Brazilian Airlines.

== Climate ==
Climate data for Tucuruí (1981–2010)
Month	Jan	Feb	Mar	Apr	May	Jun	Jul	Aug	Sep	Oct	Nov	Dec	Year
Mean daily maximum °C (°F)	31.9 (89.4)	31.6 (88.9)	31.8 (89.2)	32.0 (89.6)	32.5 (90.5)	32.9 (91.2)	33.3 (91.9)	33.9 (93.0)	33.9 (93.0)	33.7 (92.7)	33.3 (91.9)	32.5 (90.5)	32.8 (91.0)
Daily mean °C (°F)	26.9 (80.4)	26.5 (79.7)	26.6 (79.9)	26.8 (80.2)	27.2 (81.0)	27.3 (81.1)	27.0 (80.6)	27.5 (81.5)	27.7 (81.9)	28.1 (82.6)	28.0 (82.4)	27.4 (81.3)	27.3 (81.1)
Mean daily minimum °C (°F)	23.5 (74.3)	23.2 (73.8)	23.4 (74.1)	23.5 (74.3)	23.7 (74.7)	23.3 (73.9)	22.8 (73.0)	23.1 (73.6)	23.7 (74.7)	24.1 (75.4)	24.3 (75.7)	23.9 (75.0)	23.5 (74.3)
Average precipitation mm (inches)	311.5 (12.26)	413.8 (16.29)	436.7 (17.19)	407.9 (16.06)	249.1 (9.81)	86.9 (3.42)	47.3 (1.86)	31.5 (1.24)	34.8 (1.37)	68.5 (2.70)	113.3 (4.46)	230.9 (9.09)	2,432.2 (95.76)
Average precipitation days (≥ 1.0 mm)	19	21	24	23	17	8	6	4	5	6	8	14	155
Average relative humidity (%)	86.8	89.1	89.1	89.4	87.6	83.9	81.8	80.4	80.7	80.8	81.2	85.1	84.7
Mean monthly sunshine hours	146.5	128.0	135.1	151.0	197.0	239.1	254.6	248.0	186.3	154.2	129.3	124.0	2,093.1
Source: Instituto Nacional de Meteorologia

== See also ==
- List of municipalities in Pará
