= Belém/Val-de-Cans International Airport =

Airport in Belém, Brazil

Belém Airport - Júlio César Ribeiro Aeroporto de Belém - Júlio César Ribeiro

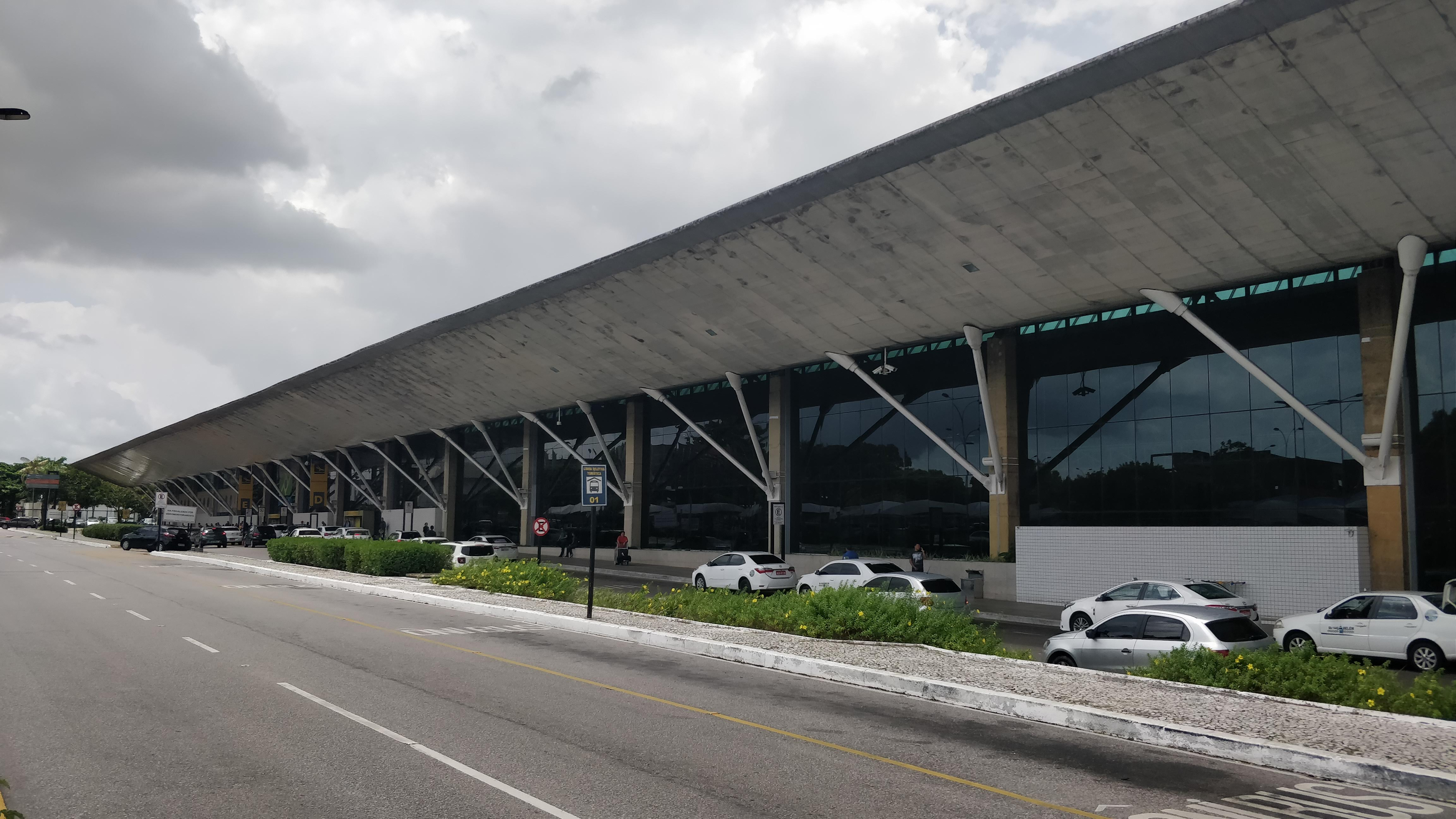
- IATA: BEL; ICAO: SBBE; LID: PA0001

Summary
- Airport type: Public/Military
- Operator: Infraero (1974–2022); NOA (2022–present)
- Serves: Belém
- Time zone: BRT (UTC−03:00)
- Elevation AMSL: 17 m (56 ft)
- Coordinates: 01°23′05″S 048°28′44″W
- Website: noa-airports.com.br

Map
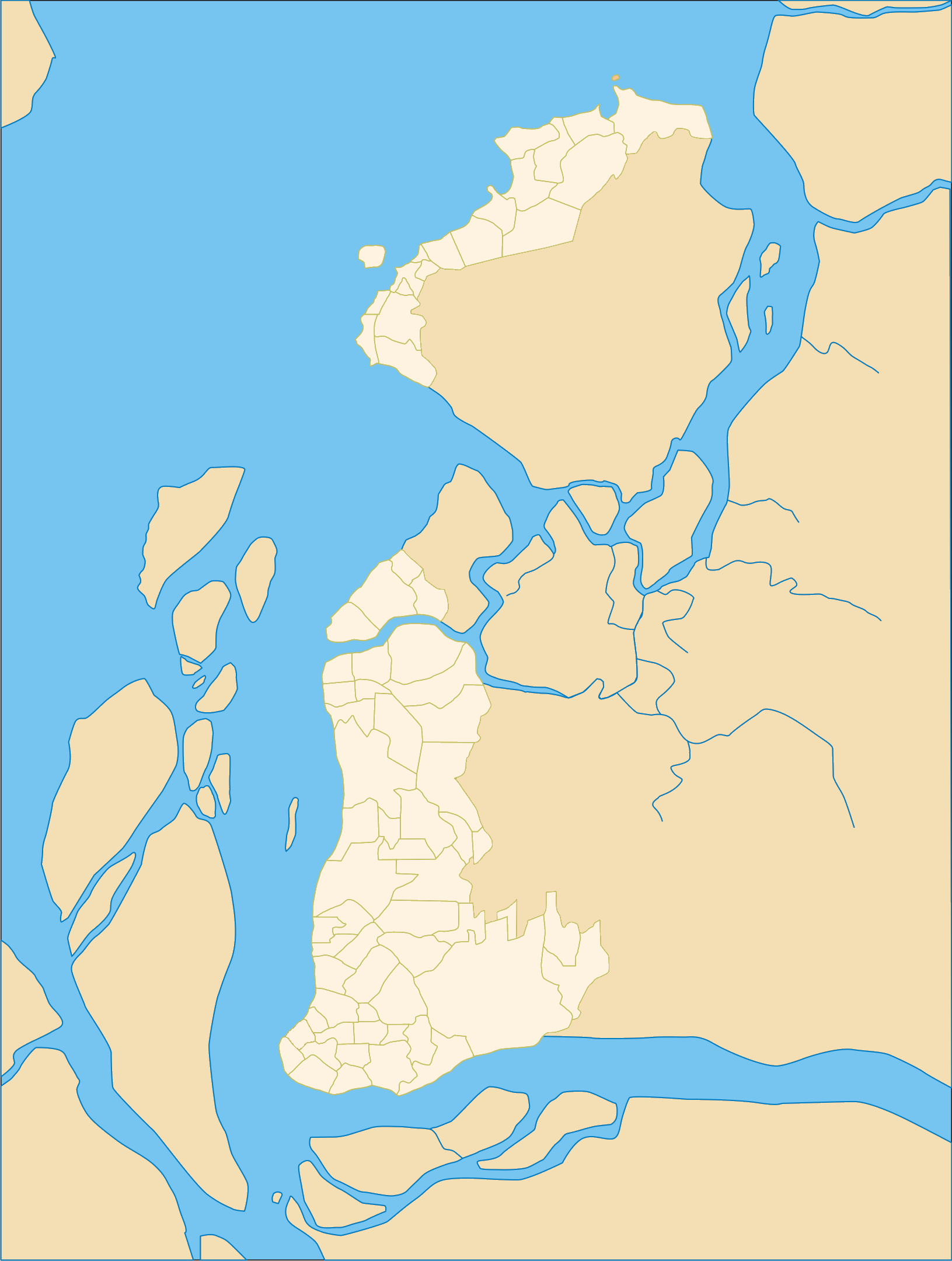
- Location in Brazil BEL (Pará) BEL (Brazil)

Runways
Direction	Length		Surface
Direction	m	ft	Surface
06/24	2,800	9,186	Asphalt
02/20	1,830	6,004	Asphalt

Statistics (2025)
- Passengers: 4,008,723 ▲20%
- Aircraft Operations: 31,846 ▲16%
- Statistics: NOA; Sources: ANAC, DECEA

Val-de-Cans/Júlio Cezar Ribeiro International Airport (IATA: BEL, ICAO: SBBE), operated by Norte da Amazônia, and located 12 km (7 mi) from downtown, is the main airport serving Belém, Brazil. Val de Cans (sometimes spelled Val de Cães) is the name of the neighborhood where the airport is located. On 13 April 2010, the airport was named after Júlio Cezar Ribeiro de Souza (1837–1887), a researcher of balloons.

The airport is operated by Consortium Novo Norte (NOA).

Some of its facilities are shared with Belém Air Force Base of the Brazilian Air Force.

== History ==
In 1934, General Eurico Gaspar Dutra, then the Director of Military Aviation, appointed Lieutenant Armando Sierra de Menezes to choose a site in Val de Cans where an airport was to be built. The Directorate of Civil Aeronautics, an agency of the Ministry of Traffic and Public Works, would be in charge of the project. Val de Cans began its history as a land track running along the east–west axis with 1,200m. The facility comprised a courtyard, a hangar, and a parking structure of concrete for military aircraft, which later became known as "Yellow Hangar."

With the outbreak of World War II, airbases and airports located on the Brazilian coast became immensely important in the support of transportation of aircraft, personnel, and equipment across the South Atlantic Ocean to Sierra Leone in West Africa. These facilities provided the necessary logistical support for the thousands of planes that, manufactured in Canada and the United States, were moved to North Africa and Europe. After protracted negotiations between Brazil and the United States, airstrips were built at Belém for the Air Transport Command with two runways measuring 1,500 x 45 meters on a basis of concrete and asphalt and comprising modern airport facilities, able to meet efficiently civil aviation and military needs. Val de Cans and other airbases used by the Americans during World War II were returned to the Ministry of Aeronautics in 1945.

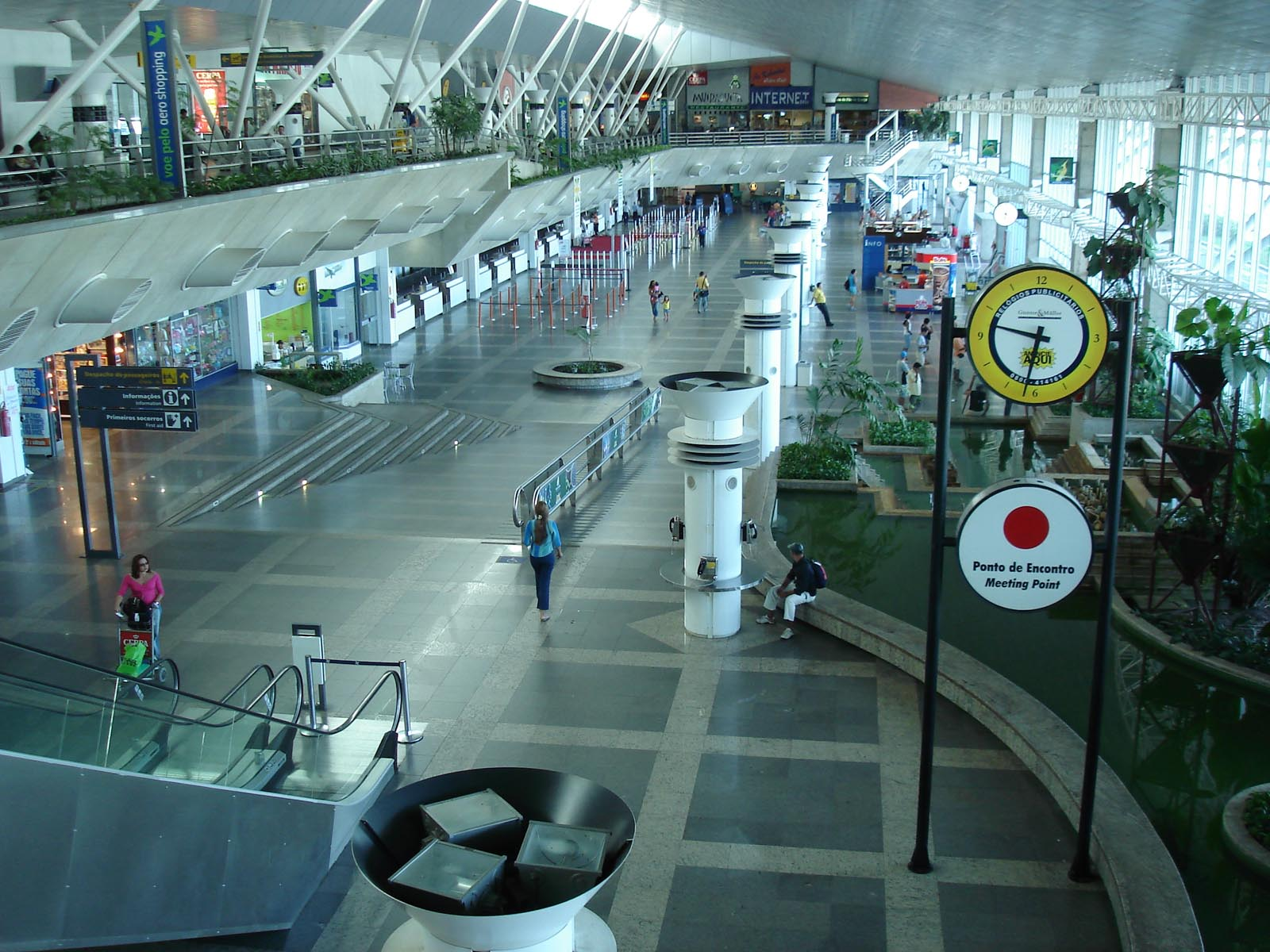
Terminal 1 airside

Panair do Brasil, Pan American, and NAB – Navegação Aérea Brasileira began their activities at Val de Cans building their stations and providing services to passengers. In 1958, the Ministry of Aeronautics began building the first passenger terminal for general airline use, which was opened on 24 January 1959. It was then administered by the Department of Civil Aviation. In 1974, its administration was transferred to Infraero.

The original passenger terminal complex underwent major renovation and expansion, which was completed in 2001. In 1999, a brand-new passenger terminal located at the side of the old terminal was built and, after its opening, the old terminal was demolished to give place for an extension to the new terminal. This newly extended terminal greatly increased the comfort and area available to passengers by adding six jetways.

Previously operated by Infraero, on August 18, 2022, the consortium Novo Norte formed by the Brazilian companies Socicam and Dix won a 30-year concession to operate the airport.

== Airlines and destinations ==
Airlines	Destinations
Air France	Cayenne
Avianca	Bogotá
Azul Brazilian Airlines	Altamira, Belo Horizonte–Confins, Campinas, Carajás, Fortaleza, Macapá, Manaus, Marabá, Recife, Santarém, São Luís
Azul Conecta	Almeirim, Breves, Carajás, Monte Dourado, Ourilândia do Norte, Paragominas, Porto de Moz, Salinópolis, Tucuruí
Gol Linhas Aéreas	Brasília, Macapá, Miami (ends 31 January 2027), Paramaribo, Rio de Janeiro–Galeão, Santarém, São Paulo–Guarulhos
LATAM Brasil	Brasília, Fortaleza, Macapá, Manaus, São Paulo–Guarulhos
Surinam Airways	Paramaribo
TAP Air Portugal	Lisbon

== Statistics ==
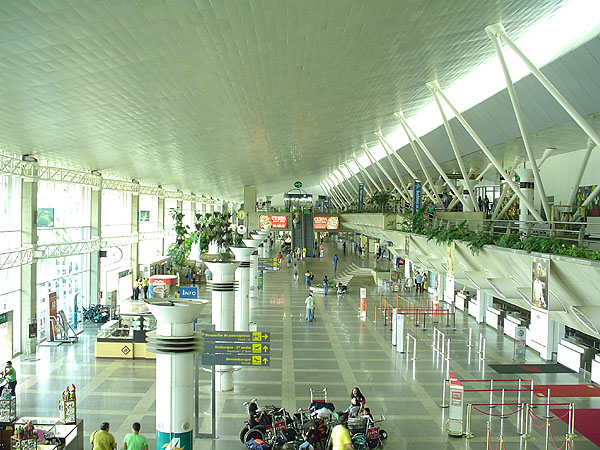
Check-in area

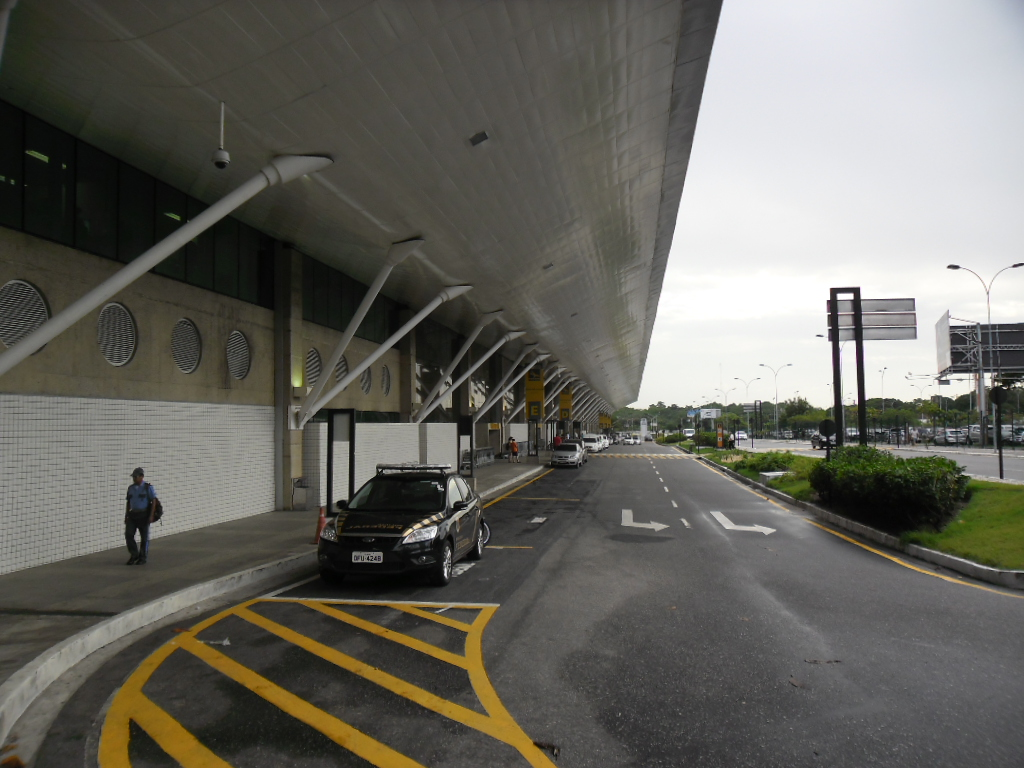
Terminal landside

Following is the number of passenger, aircraft and cargo movements at the airport, according to Infraero (2007-August 2023) and NOA (September 2023-2025) reports:

Year	Passenger	Aircraft	Cargo (t)
2025	4,008,723 ▲20%	31,846 ▲16%	
2024	3,347,827 ▼7%	27,418 ▼44%	
2023	3,594,104 ▲6%	49,121 ▲2%	
2022	3,393,936 ▲23%	48,333 ▲31%	24,285 ▲24%
2021	2,764,751 ▲33%	36,912 ▲24%	19,656 ▲42%
2020	2,079,240 ▼43%	29,740 ▼23%	13,840 ▼29%
2019	3,628,807 ▲3%	38,519 ▼1%	19,565 ▼10%
2018	3,520,803 ▲6%	38,856 ▲3%	21,811 ▲8%
2017	3,311,817 ▲1%	37,760 ▼7%	20,216 ▲11%
2016	3,282,513 ▼12%	40,421 ▼22%	18,172 ▼26%
2015	3,714,761 ▼5%	51,639 ▼6%	24,459 ▼23%
2014	3,890,791 ▲12%	55,218 ▲2%	31,699 ▼4%
2013	3,475,611 ▲4%	54,008 ▼2%	33,009 ▲6%
2012	3,342,711 ▲12%	54,836 ▲6%	31,218 ▲47%
2011	2,996,328 ▲15%	51,749 ▲14%	21,266 ▲9%
2010	2,605,467 ▲18%	45,302 ▲14%	19,460 ▼8%
2009	2,203,653 ▲2%	39,824	21,087 ▼4%
2008	2,153,727 ▲2%	39,922 ▼1%	22,012 ▲13%
2007	2,119,552	40,124	19,444

== Accidents and incidents ==
- 14 July 1948: An Aerovias Brasil Douglas C-47A-70-DL registration PP-AVO doing a cargo flight, crashed and caught fire after taking-off from Belém-Val de Cans. All five passengers and crew died.
- 1 December 1955: A Cruzeiro do Sul Douglas C-47B-28-DK registration PP-CCC after takeoff from Belém-Val de Cans lost power on engine no. 1. Consequent technical problems led the aircraft to lose altitude and the left wing struck a tree and broke off. The aircraft stalled, hit the ground and caught fire. All six passengers and crew died.
- 16 January 1958: A Cruzeiro do Sul cargo Fairchild C-82A-FA Packet registration PP-CEF crashed near Belém-Val de Cans when no. 1 engine caught fire after take-off. The crew of three died.
- 11 August 1958: A Lóide Aéreo Nacional Douglas DC-4 registration PP-LEQ crashed for unknown causes over Carapí Island, Pará, while on a night-time visual approach to Belém-Val de Cans. Of the 11 passengers and crew aboard, one passenger survived.
- 6 May 1959: A Paraense Curtiss C-46/Super C-46 Commando registration PP-BTA crashed shortly after take-off from Belém-Val de Cans. Three crew members died.
- 22 September 1960: A Paraense Curtiss C-46/Super C-46 Commando registration PP-BTF crashed shortly after take-off from Belém-Val de Cans. Seven occupants died.
- 8 October 1969: A Cruzeiro do Sul Sud Aviation SE-210 Caravelle VI R en route from Belém-Val de Cans to Manaus-Ponta Pelada was hijacked by four persons who demanded to be flown to Cuba. The hijack lasted less than a day and there were no victims.
- 12 November 1969: A Cruzeiro do Sul NAMC YS-11/11A en route from Manaus-Ponta Pelada to Belém-Val de Cans was hijacked by a person who demanded to be flown to Cuba. There were no victims.
- 14 March 1970: A Paraense Fairchild Hiller FH-227B registration PP-BUF operating flight 903 from São Luiz to Belém-Val de Cans, while on final approach to land, crashed into Guajará Bay. Of the 40 passengers and crew, three survived.
- 4 July 1970: A Cruzeiro do Sul NAMC YS-11 en route from Belém-Val de Cans to Macapá was hijacked by a person and flown to Cayenne, Georgetown, Trinidad and Tobago, Antigua and Jamaica.
- 24 February 1981: A VOTEC Embraer EMB110P Bandeirante registration PT-GLB flying from Tucuruí to Belém-Val de Cans collided with a ship in dry dock while approaching Belém in rain and high winds. The aircraft subsequently struck two barges and broke in two. The front part crashed onto a tug, and the tail section sank. Only three passengers of a total of 14 passengers and crew survived.
- 3 February 1984: A Cruzeiro do Sul Airbus A300B4-203 operating flight 302 en route from São Luís to Belém-Val de Cans with 176 passengers and crew aboard was hijacked by three persons who demanded to be taken to Cuba. The flight reached Camagüey in less than a day. There were no victims.

== See also ==
- List of airports in Brazil
- Belém Air Force Base
