= Tucuruí Airport =

Airport in Pará, Brazil

Tucuruí Regional Airport Aeroporto Regional de Tucuruí
- IATA: TUR; ICAO: SBTU; LID: PA0007

Summary
- Airport type: Public
- Operator: Esaero
- Serves: Tucuruí
- Time zone: BRT (UTC−03:00)
- Elevation AMSL: 253 m (830 ft)
- Coordinates: 03°46′37″S 049°43′11″W
- Website: grupotw8.aero/aeroporto-regional-de-tucurui/

Map
- Location in Brazil TUR (Brazil)

Runways
Direction	Length		Surface
Direction	m	ft	Surface
02/20	2,000	6,562	Asphalt
- Sources: Airport Website, ANAC, DECEA

Tucuruí Regional Airport (IATA: TUR, ICAO: SBTU) is the airport serving Tucuruí, Brazil.

It is operated by Esaero.

== Airlines and destinations ==
Airlines	Destinations
Azul Conecta	Belém

== Access ==
The airport is located 8 km (5 mi) from downtown Tucuruí.

== See also ==
- List of airports in Brazil
