= Marechal Cunha Machado International Airport =

São Luís–Marechal Cunha Machado International Airport Aeroporto Internacional de São Luís–Marechal Cunha Machado

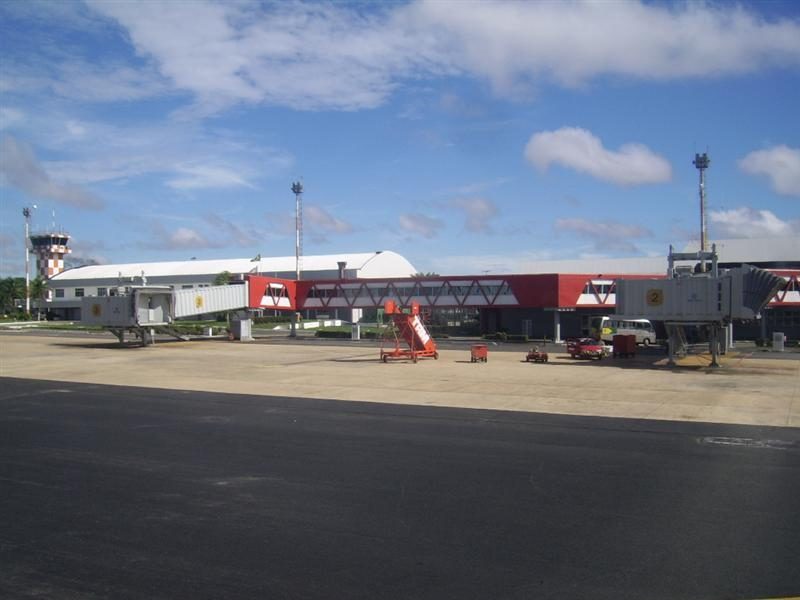
- IATA: SLZ; ICAO: SBSL; LID: MA0001

Summary
- Airport type: Public
- Operator: Infraero (1975–2021); Motiva (2021–2026); ASUR (2026–present)
- Serves: São Luís
- Time zone: BRT (UTC−03:00)
- Elevation AMSL: 54 m (177 ft)
- Coordinates: 02°35′13″S 044°14′10″W
- Website: aeroportos.motiva.com.br/sao-luis-ma/

Map
- Location in Brazil

Runways
Direction	Length		Surface
Direction	m	ft	Surface
06/24	2,385	7,825	Asphalt
09/27	1,464	4,803	Asphalt

Statistics (2025)
- Passengers: 1,839,199 ▲23%
- Aircraft Operations: 21,565 ▲12%
- Statistics: Motiva; Sources: Airport Website, ANAC, DECEA

São Luís–Marechal Cunha Machado International Airport (IATA: SLZ, ICAO: SBSL), formerly called Tirirical Airport, is the airport serving São Luís, Brazil. Since 17 October 1985, the airport is named after Air Marshall Hugo da Cunha Machado (1898–1989), born in Maranhão.

It is operated by ASUR.

== History ==
In 1942, a grass track measuring one thousand meters (runway 09/27), which served the airbase of the Brazilian Army, was the only way that São Luís had to receive flights. Runway 06/24 was built as part of the US base which began operating in 1943.

In 1974, technical jurisdiction, administrative and operational services were transferred to Infraero.

The new terminal of the airport was opened in June 1998 and in October 2004, it was upgraded to international category.

Previously operated by Infraero, on April 7, 2021, CCR won a 30-year concession to operate the airport. On April 26, 2025 CCR was rebranded as Motiva.

On November 18, 2025 the entire airports portfolio of Motiva was sold to the Mexican airport operator ASUR. Motiva will cease to operate airports. The transaction was completed on August 31, 2026.

== Airlines and destinations ==
=== Passenger ===
Airlines	Destinations
Azul Brazilian Airlines	Belém, Belo Horizonte–Confins, Campinas, Imperatriz, Recife
Gol Linhas Aéreas	Brasília, Rio de Janeiro–Galeão, Salvador da Bahia, São Paulo–Guarulhos; Seasonal: Belo Horizonte–Confins, Fortaleza, São Paulo–Congonhas
LATAM Brasil	Brasília, Fortaleza, Rio de Janeiro–Galeão, São Paulo–Congonhas, São Paulo–Guarulhos
TAP Air Portugal	Lisbon

=== Cargo ===
Airlines	Destinations
Gol Linhas Aéreas	São Paulo–Guarulhos, Teresina

== Statistics ==
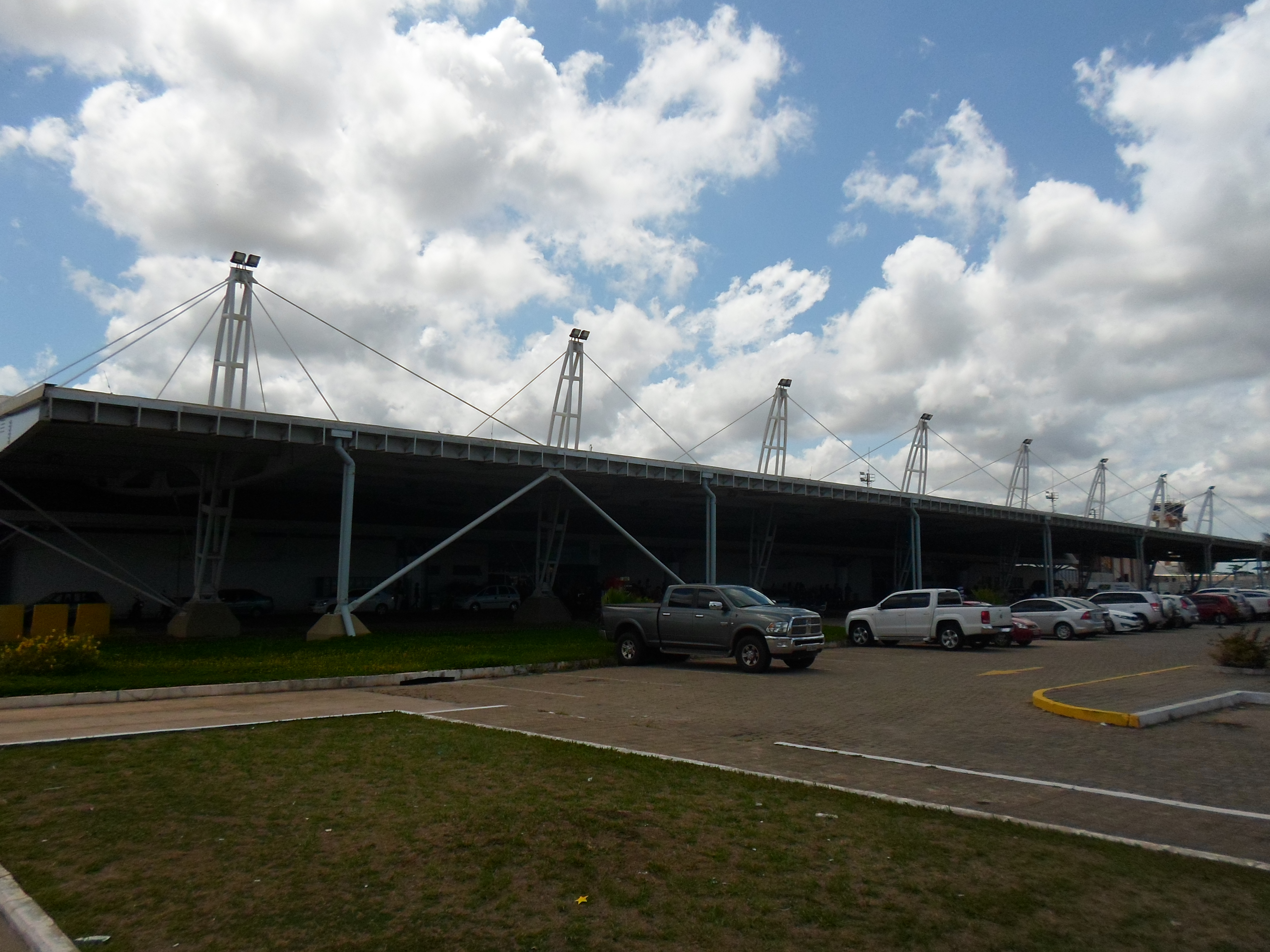
Terminal landside view in 2014

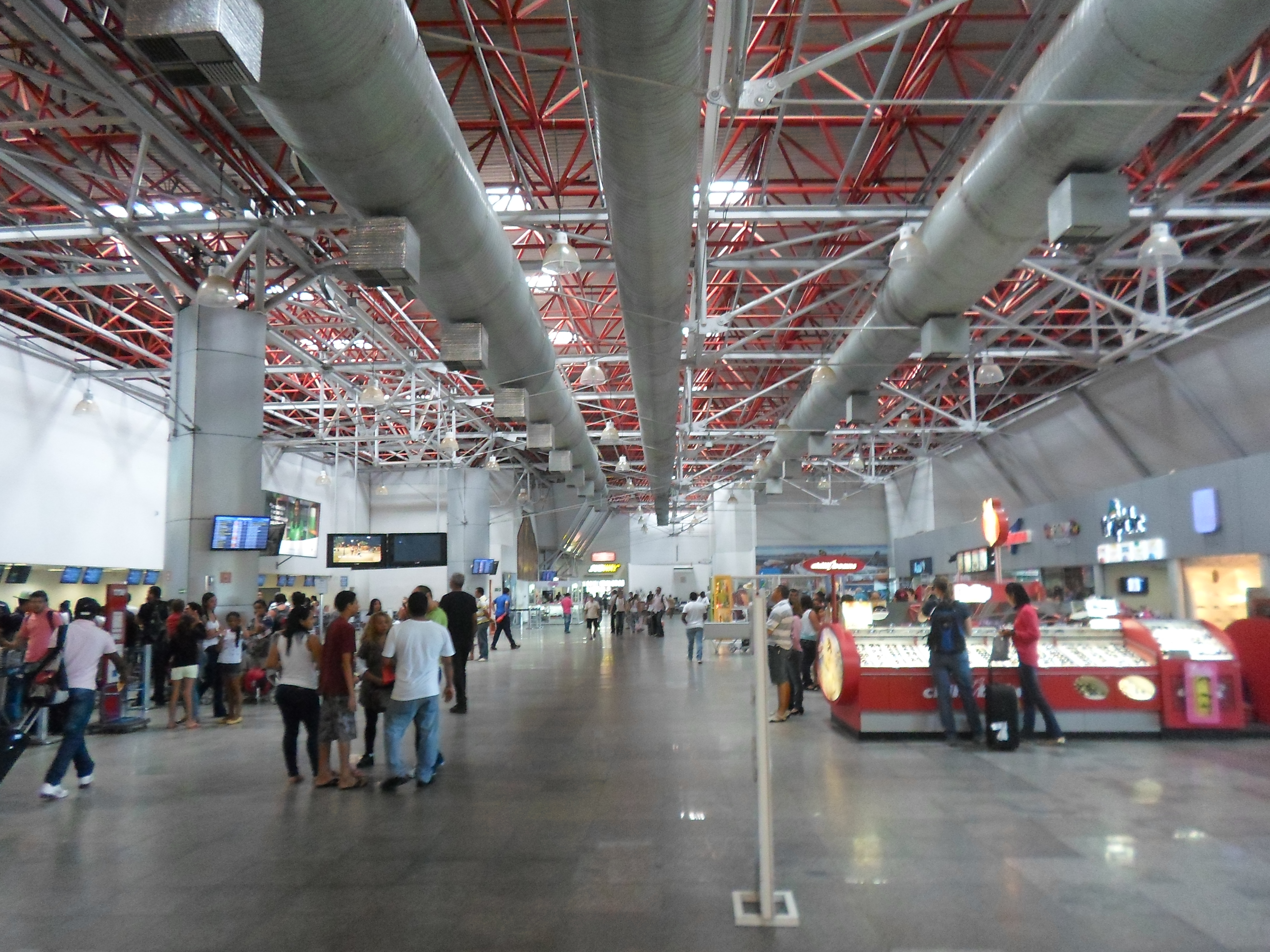
Terminal in 2014

Following are the number of passenger, aircraft and cargo movements at the airport, according to Infraero (2007-2021) and CCR (2022-2025) reports:

Year	Passenger	Aircraft	Cargo (t)
2025	1,839,199 ▲23%	21,565 ▲12%	
2024	1,490,915 ▼4%	19,192 ▼5%	
2023	1,548,876	20,205	4,060
2022^{a}	1,128,108	16,585	3,403
2021	1,116,871 ▲34%	15,754 ▲28%	3,611 ▲39%
2020	836,336 ▼50%	12,311 ▼31%	2,602 ▼52%
2019	1,675,549 ▲5%	17,816 ▼5%	5,430 ▲2%
2018	1,598,004	18,733 ▼5%	5,300 ▲27%
2017	1,601,836 ▲5%	19,695 ▲4%	4,188 ▼20%
2016	1,520,847 ▼11%	18,880 ▼20%	3,495 ▼30%
2015	1,701,015 ▼7%	23,470 ▼9%	4,488 ▼24%
2014	1,833,799 ▲1%	25,821 ▼8%	6,530 ▼8%
2013	1,815,909 ▼9%	27,975 ▼8%	7,063 ▼12%
2012	1,991,099 ▲8%	30,358 ▲9%	8,018 ▼15%
2011	1,843,384 ▲34%	27,924 ▲18%	9,477 ▲18%
2010	1,379,146 ▲40%	23,643 ▲23%	8,000 ▲9%
2009	984,756 ▲13%	19,284	7,330 ▼5%
2008	870,784 ▼3%	19,310 ▼3%	7,693 ▲10%
2007	900,357	19,994	6,973

Note:
^{a}: 2022 series provided by CCR is incomplete, lacking data for the months of January, February and part of March.

== Accidents and incidents ==
- 1 June 1973: a Cruzeiro do Sul Sud Aviation SE-210 Caravelle VI N registration PP-PDX operating flight 109 from Belém-Val de Cans to São Luís crashed on approach to São Luís. Engine no.1 lost power and the aircraft attained an extreme nose-up attitude. It stalled and crashed 760m to the right of the runway. All 23 passengers and crew died.
- 3 February 1984: a Cruzeiro do Sul Airbus A300B4-203 operating flight 302 en route from São Luís to Belém-Val de Cans with 176 passengers and crew aboard was hijacked by 3 persons who demanded to be taken to Cuba. The flight reached Camagüey in less than a day. There were no deaths among the victims.

== Access ==
The airport is located 15 km (9 mi) from downtown São Luís.

== See also ==
- List of airports in Brazil
