= Lajeado State Park =

State park in Tocantins, Brazil

- Parque Estadual do Lajeado
- IUCN category II (national park)
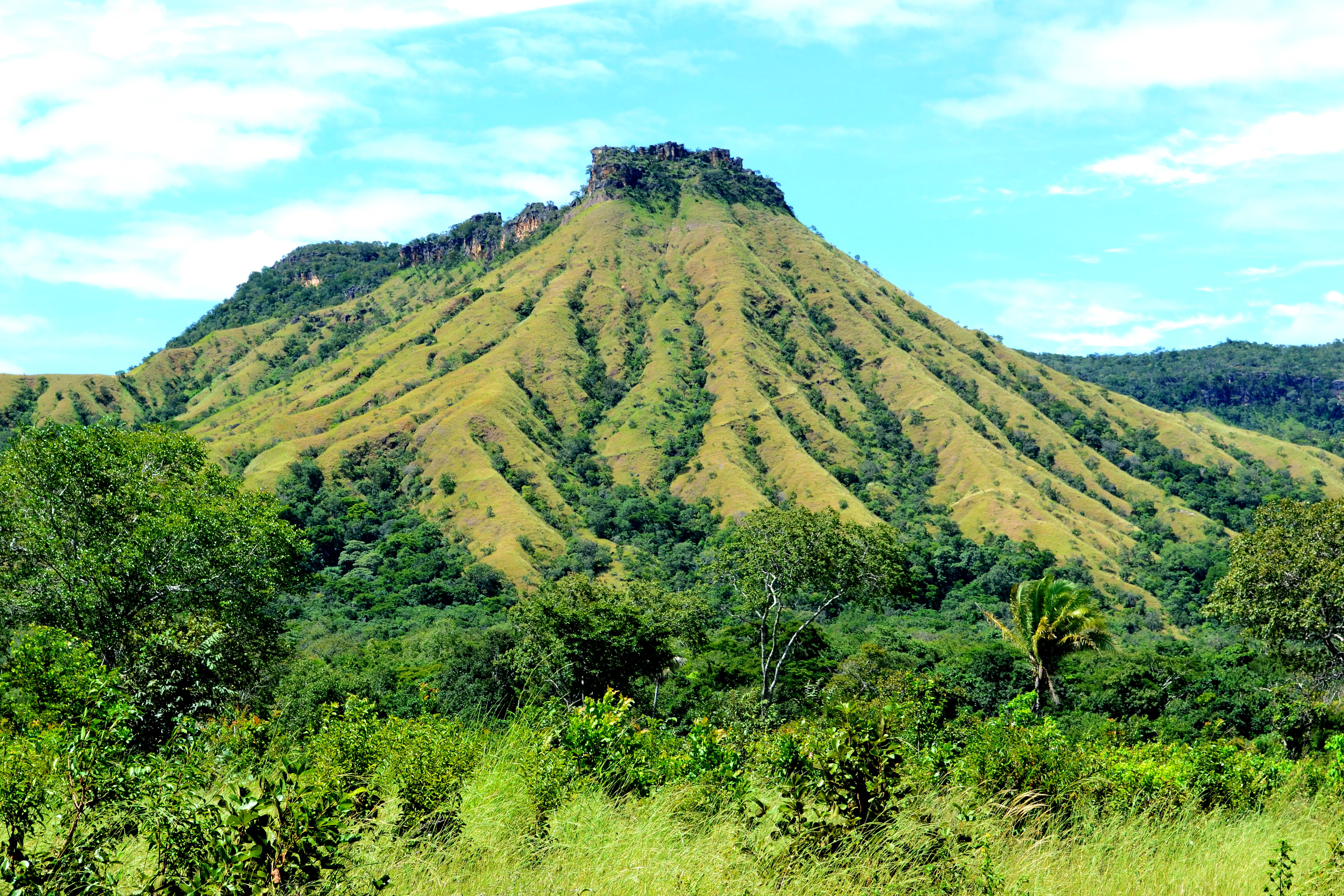
- Morro do Segredo in the park

- Location within Brazil
- Nearest city: Palmas, Tocantins
- Coordinates: 10°06′05″S 48°14′46″W
- Area: 9,931 hectares (24,540 acres)
- Designation: State park
- Created: 11 May 2001
- Administrator: Instituto Natureza do Tocantins

The Lajeado State Park (Portuguese: Parque Estadual do Lajeado) is a state park in the state of Tocantins, Brazil. It protects a fragile, dry, hilly environment near the state capital of Palmas.

== Location ==
The Lajeado State Park is divided between the municipalities of Palmas (87.92%) and Lajeado (12.08%) in the state of Tocantins. It covers an area of 9,931 hectares (24,540 acres). It is in the Lajeado sub-basin of the Tocantins River basin. The park lies in the Tocantins residual plain and covers a plateau bounded to the west by the Frente de Cuesta escarpment, which drops to the Tocantins depression. It lies to the east of the state capital, Palmas, with its entrance about 18 kilometres (11 mi) from the city.

The park contains springs, waterfalls and cave paintings. There is a staff residence in the park. The park may be visited after giving advance notice for hiking, contemplation or interpretation with guidance from trained guides. There was a fish farm before the park was established, but it has been closed. The park is surrounded by the Serra do Lajeado Environmental Protection Area.

== History ==
The Lajeado State Park was created by law 1224 of 11 May 2001 to protect the fauna, flora and natural resources to ensure the sustainable exploitation of tourism potential. Objectives include providing controlled access for tourism, education and scientific research, as well as protecting the water supplies of the city and curbing urban sprawl. The management plan was published on 31 December 2005, although it was not made official through a legislative instrument. The composition of the consultative council was defined on 6 June 2016.

== Environment ==
The park is in the cerrado biome. The climate is humid to sub-humid, with fairly constant temperatures throughout the year. Rainfall is concentrated in a 5–6 month period and ranges from 100 to 300 millimetres (3.9 to 11.8 in) annually.. The park consists of areas of field, savanna and forest. It has a fragile environment that requires careful monitoring to ensure sustainable use. Threats include cattle grazing, invasion by squatters, hunting and gathering, fires and urban sprawl.

171 species of flora have been found, from 61 families. Leguminosa was the family with the highest number of species (28), followed by Aracaceae (8), Melastomataceae, Rubiaceae and Vochysiaceae with six species each. There are no endemic, rare or endangered plant species. The main species are Qualea grandiflora (pau-terra), Curatella americana (Lixeira), Plathymenia reticulata (pau-santo), Vellozia squamata (canela-de-ema) and Byrsonima subterranea (murici).

A survey of the park and its area of influence recorded 41 species of mammals, 219 of birds, 4 of reptiles and 50 amphibians. Vertebrates include small mammals such as rodents, marsupials and bats; larger mammals such as paca, fox, maned wolf, tapir and jaguar; primates such as robust capuchin monkeys, howler monkeys and black-tufted marmosets; birds such as guan, hummingbird, seriema and black-chested buzzard-eagle; snakes, lizards, turtles, alligators, frogs and toads. Species endemic to the cerrado are rufous-winged antshrike (Thamnophilus torquatus), helmeted manakin (Antilophia galeata) and curl-crested jay (Cyanocorax cristatellus).

== Sources ==
- Parque Estadual do Lajeado (in Portuguese), Tocantins government: Gestão das Unidades de Conservação do Tocantins
- Parque Estadual do Lajeado (in Portuguese), Turismo Tocantins
- PES do Lajeado (in Portuguese), ISA: Instituto Socioambiental
