= Odir Rocha =

Brazilian doctor and politician (1941–2022)

Mayor of Palmas
- In office 1 January 1997 – 31 December 2000
- Preceded by: Eduardo Siqueira Campos
- Succeeded by: Nilmar Ruiz

Member of the Chamber of Deputies of Brazil
- In office 3 February 1995 – 3 March 1995

Mayor of Colinas do Tocantins
- In office 1989–1993

Personal details
- Born: Manoel Odir Rocha; 12 February 1941 Araguari, Brazil
- Died: 4 May 2022 (aged 81) Palmas, Brazil
- Political party: ARENA; PPR

Manoel Odir Rocha (12 February 1941 – 4 May 2022) was a Brazilian politician. A member of the Reform Progressive Party, he served as mayor of Palmas from 1997 to 2000 and briefly served in the Chamber of Deputies from February to March 1995. He died in Palmas on 4 May 2022 at the age of 81.
