= Old Palmas Airport =

Former airport that served Palmas, Brazil

Old Palmas Airport Aeroporto Antigo de Palmas
- IATA: ~~PMW~~; ICAO: ~~SWPJ~~

Summary
- Airport type: Defunct
- Operator: Infraero (1997–2001)
- Serves: Palmas
- Opened: early 1990s
- Closed: 4 October 2001
- Coordinates: 10°12′19″S 048°20′33″W

Map
- Location in Brazil
- Demolished, no longer operational.

Old Palmas Airport (IATA: ~~PMW~~, ICAO: ~~SWPJ~~) was an airport that served Palmas, Brazil until 2001, when Brigadeiro Lysias Rodrigues International Airport was opened. On that very occasion the airport was closed.

== History ==
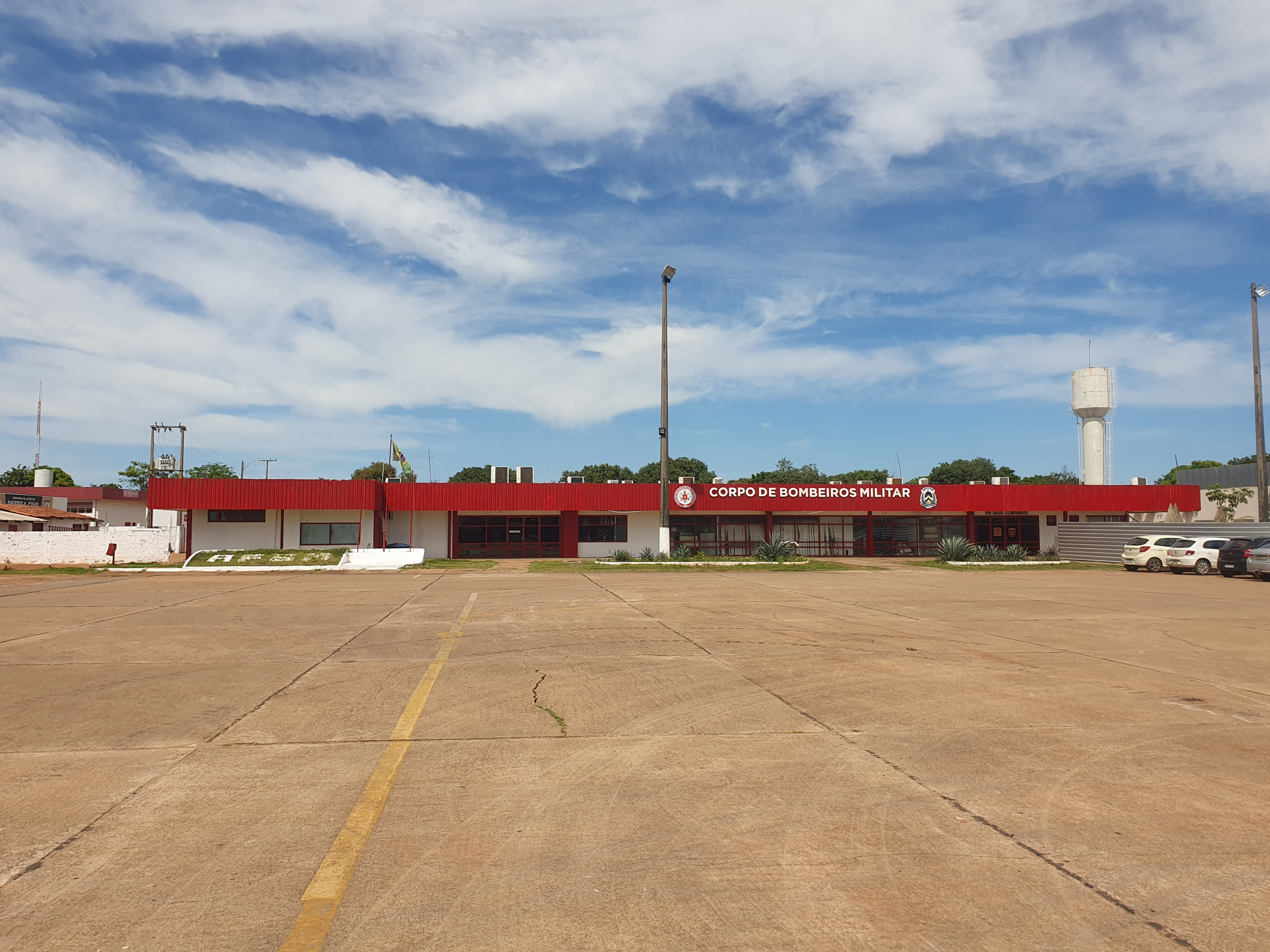
Old Palmas Airport terminal building presently the Firefighters Academy of the State of Tocantins

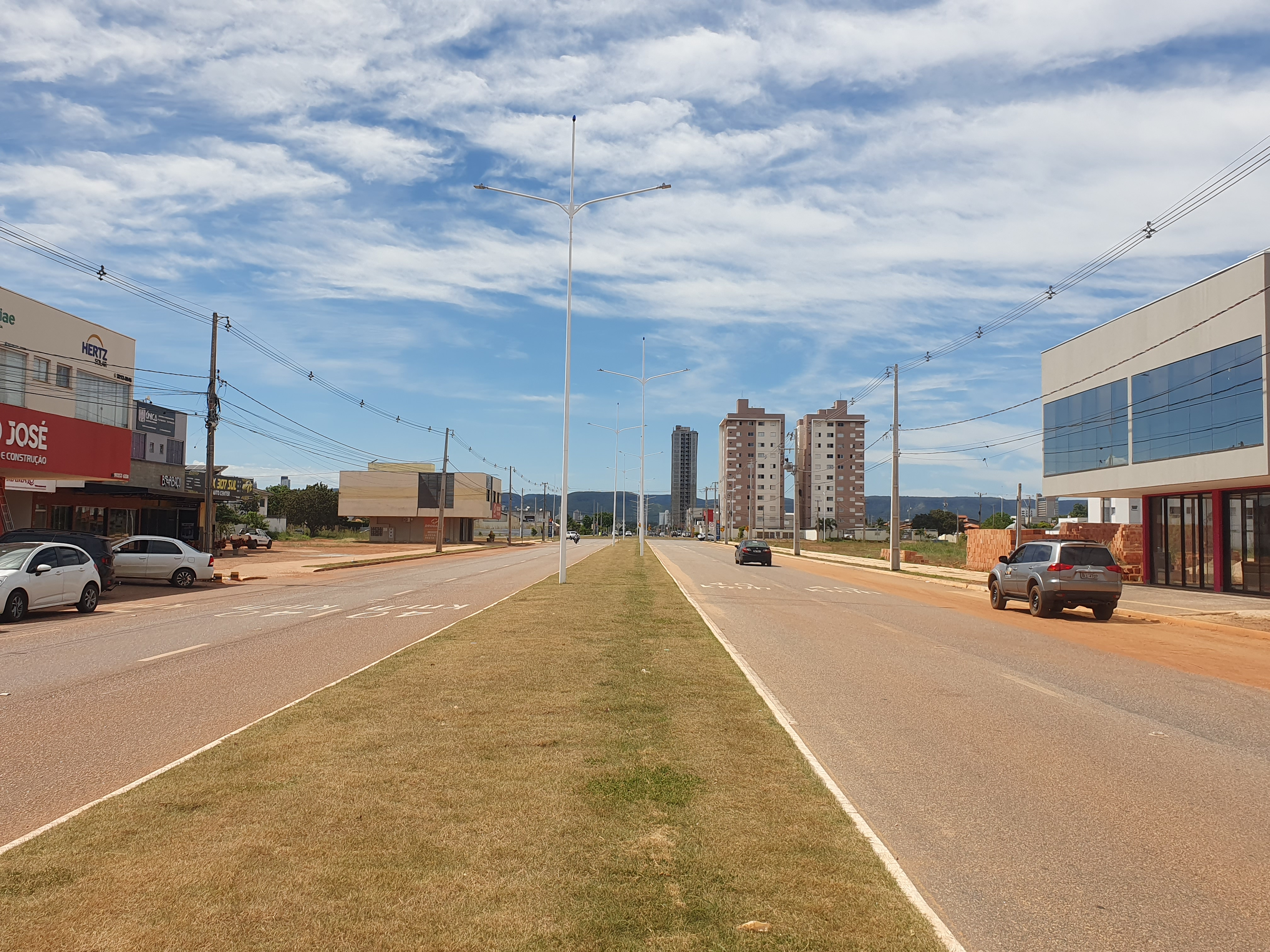
Runway of Old Palmas Airport presently Avenue LO-9

Old Palmas Airport was the first airport of Palmas, Brazil. It was opened as a provisory facility in the early 1990s.

It was operated by Infraero between 1997 and 2001.

It was closed on October 4, 2001, one day before Brigadeiro Lysias Rodrigues International Airport was opened at a different location.

The former runway is now Avenue LO-9 between Avenues NS-09 and Teotônio Segurado. The former terminal has been preserved and is now used as the Firefighters Academy of the State of Tocantins (EFAB), located at Block 403 South (ARSO 41). The former apron still exists in front of the Academy. The former hangar now houses the First Battalion of Firefighters.

== Access ==
The airport was located 4 km (2 mi) south of downtown Palmas.
