= TV Anhanguera Araguaína =

TV Anhanguera Araguaína (ZYP 316)
- Araguaína, Tocantins; Brazil
- Channels: Digital: 24 (UHF); Virtual: 11
- Branding: TV Anhanguera

Programming
- Affiliations: TV Globo

Ownership
- Owner: Grupo Jaime Cãmara; (Televisão Anhanguera de Araguaína, S.A.)

History
- First air date: December 10, 1976
- Former channel numbers: Analog: 2 (1976–1994), 11 (1994–2021)

Technical information
- Licensing authority: ANATEL
- ERP: 1 kW

Links
- Public license information: Profile
- Website: redeglobo.globo.com/tvanhanguera

TV Anhanguera Araguaína (channel 11) is a Brazilian television station licensed to Araguaína, a city in the far north of the state of Tocantins. It was established as the first inland television station of the Rede Anhanguera network at a time when the current area of Tocantins was part of the state of Goiás.

== History ==
Television was introduced to Araguaína in 1976, through TV Araguaína, the first television station to operate in what was then far northern Goiás. The station relayed programs from a relay station in Imperatriz, southern Maranhão, carrying Rede Tupi programs. TV Annhanguera followed on December 10, 1976, justified by Organizações Jaime Câmara as being the largest city at the time of the decision, at a time when the region was isolated, receiving state-of-the-art equipment for the time. Its signals reached Colinas de Goiás (currently Colinas do Tocantins), Axixá (Tocantins), Tocantinópolis, Araguanã, Guaraí, Wanderlândia and Filadélfia in far northern Goiás, as well as Carolina and Porto Franco in southern Maranhão. Still in its test phase, there were high sales of television sets (both in black and white and in color) in Araguaína. On July 29, 1977, the station shut down by orders of minister of communications Euclides Quandt de Oliveira. leaving only TV Anhanguera Araguaína as the only station. This was met with criticism from locals, as TV Araguaína produced live local programming, while TV Anhanguera, at the time, did not, airing programs from Globo on a delay of up to one month.

The signal went beyond the state's borders, being receivable as far as Carolina, in Maranhão, enabling locals to watch the 1978 FIFA World Cup.

On August 30, 1982, the station upgraded its status from relay station to a generating station. When the state became independent in 1988, the station had limited technical know-how

== Technical information ==
| Virtual channel | Digital channel | Screen resolution | Programming |
|---|---|---|---|
| 11.1 | 24 UHF | 1080i | TV Anhanguera/Globo's main programming |

Digital broadcasts started on May 2, 2014, alongside TV Anhanguera Gurupi.
