= TV Anhanguera Gurupi =

TV Anhanguera Gurupi (ZYP 321)
Gurupi, Tocantins; Brazil
- Channels: Digital: 23 (UHF); Virtual: 11
- Branding: TV Anhanguera

Programming
- Affiliations: TV Globo

Ownership
- Owner: Grupo Jaime Cãmara; (Televisão Rio Formoso S.A.)

History
- First air date: December 20, 1977
- Former channel numbers: Analog: 2 (1977-1987), 11 (1987-2021)

Technical information
- Licensing authority: ANATEL
- ERP: 1 kW

Links
- Public license information: Profile
- Website: redeglobo.globo.com/tvanhanguera

TV Anhanguera Gurupi (channel 11) is a Brazilian television station licensed to Gurupi, a city in southern Tocantins. Third oldest station in the Rede Anhanguera network, it was established when Gurupi was still a part of the state of Goiás.

== History ==
With TV Anhanguera's expansion plan to the north of the state of Goiás, a relay station in Araguaína was established. In the following year, at the request of the locals of Gurupi, Organização Jaime Câmara founded its retransmitting station on December 20, 1977, through VHF channel 2. On March 5, 1982, by means of a decree signed by João Figueiredo, the station starts relaying TV Anhanguera from Goiânia in real time, as well as having access to satellite connections. Short newscasts were also produced for the first time, interspersed with the programming from Goiânia. On June 3, 1987, DENTEL authorized the move from channel 2 to channel 11.

In 1989, following the emancipation of the state of Tocantins, Rede Anhanguera, at the time made up of four stations, gains its two-state status. Due to its geographical proximity to the state capital Palmas, the Gurupi station became the flagship for the new state, beginning local programming in 1991. In 1995, OJC opens a subsidiary of TV Anhanguera Gurupi in the capital, starting its local signal generation from there, and 10 years later, TV Anhanguera Palmas started broadcasting, becoming the new state flagship.

== Technical information ==
Virtual channel	Digital channel	Screen resolution	Programming
11.1	23 UHF	1080i	TV Anhanguera/Globo's main programming

Digital broadcasts started on May 2, 2014, alongside TV Anhanguera Araguaína.

== Programming ==
The station started producing local programming in February 1991, with Bom Dia Tocantins and the two editions of Jornal Anhanguera, situation which continued until 2005, when the Palmas station became the new state flagship. The station continued producing local segments of Jornal Anhanguera 1.ª edição and full editions of Jornal Anhanguera 2.ª edição (the latter until 2017), but on May 7, 2020, Rede Anhanguera ceased all local production in Gurupi and Araguaína due to cost cuts caused by the pandemic, which led to the firing of most of its staff. Since then, it relays the programming from Palmas.
