= Enio =

Enio is a given name. It may refer to:

- Enio Conti (1913-2005), American football player
- Enio Sclisizzi (1925-2012), Canadian ice hockey player
- Enio Iommi (1926-2013), Argentine visual artist
- Ênio Andrade (1928-1997), Brazilian football manager and former midfielder
- Enio Mora (1949-1996), Italian gangster
- Enio Oliveira Junior (born 1981), known as Eninho, Brazilian football attacking midfielder
- Ênio (footballer, born 1985), Ênio Santos de Oliveira, Brazilian football centre-back
- Enio Novoa (born 1986), Peruvian football midfielder
- Enio Zilić (born 2000), Bosnian football centre-back
- Ênio (footballer, born 2001), Sebastião Enio Santos de Almeida, Brazilian football attacking midfielder
