= Taquarussu =

Taquarussu may refer to

- Taquarussu, Tocantins, a village in the state of Tocantins, Brazil
- Taquarussu, Mato Grosso do Sul, a municipality of the state of Mato Grosso do Sul, Brazil
