= Palmas Airport =

Palmas–Brigadeiro Lysias Rodrigues International Airport Aeroporto Internacional de Palmas–Brigadeiro Lysias Rodrigues

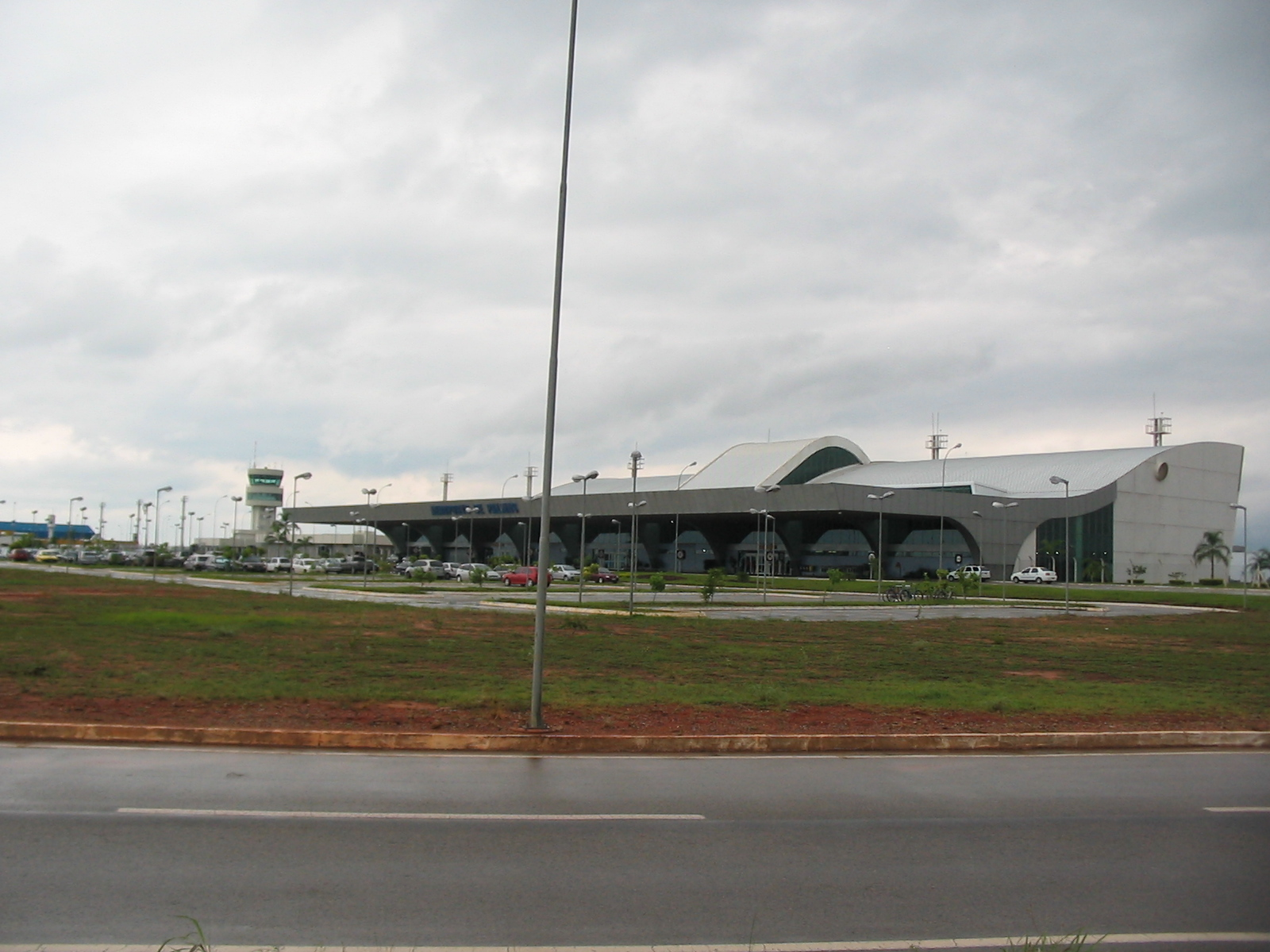
- IATA: PMW; ICAO: SBPJ; LID: TO0001

Summary
- Airport type: Public
- Operator: Infraero (2001–2021); Motiva (2021–2026); ASUR (2026–present)
- Serves: Palmas
- Opened: 5 October 2001
- Time zone: BRT (UTC−03:00)
- Elevation AMSL: 236 m (774 ft)
- Coordinates: 10°17′24″S 048°21′28″W
- Website: aeroportos.motiva.com.br/palmas-to/

Map
- Location in Brazil

Runways
Direction	Length		Surface
Direction	m	ft	Surface
14/32	2,500	8,202	Asphalt

Statistics (2025)
- Passengers: 747,178 ▲14%
- Aircraft Operations: 12,109 ▲28%
- Statistics: Motiva; Sources: Airport Website, ANAC, DECEA

Palmas–Brigadeiro Lysias Rodrigues International Airport (IATA: PMW, ICAO: SBPJ) is the airport serving Palmas, Brazil. The airport is named after Brigadier Lysias Augusto Rodrigues (1896–1957), one of the founding figures of the Brazilian Air Force and crucial to the integration of Tocantins to Brazil via the passenger air services of the Brazilian Air Force.

It is operated by ASUR.

== History ==
The airport was built as a replacement for the provisory Old Palmas Airport.

It was commissioned on October 5, 2001. It has an area of 23,739,952.00 m^{2} which is enough to future expansions. The terminal has 12,300 m^{2} and a capacity for 2 100,000 passengers/year.

Previously operated by Infraero, on April 7, 2021 CCR won a 30-year concession to operate the airport. On April 26, 2025 CCR was rebranded as Motiva.

On November 18, 2025 the entire airports portfolio of Motiva was sold to the Mexican airport operator ASUR. Motiva will cease to operate airports. The transaction was completed on August 31, 2026.

== Airlines and destinations ==
Airlines	Destinations
Azul Brazilian Airlines	Belo Horizonte–Confins, Campinas, Goiânia
Gol Linhas Aéreas	Araguaína (ends 28 February 2027), Brasília, São Paulo–Congonhas (ends 11 December 2026), São Paulo–Guarulhos
LATAM Brasil	Brasília, São Paulo–Guarulhos

== Statistics ==
Following are the number of passenger, aircraft and cargo movements at the airport, according to Infraero (2007-2021) and Motiva (2022-2025) reports:

Year	Passenger	Aircraft	Cargo (t)
2025	747,178 ▲14%	12,109 ▲28%	
2024	656,040 ▼4%	9,497 ▼14%	
2023	682,238	11,104	1,554
2022^{a}	516,414	9,389	1,307
2021	444,719 ▲69%	9,320 ▲35%	1,631 ▲52%
2020	263,819 ▼55%	6,927 ▼38%	1,076 ▼64%
2019	588,198 ▼13%	11,144 ▼14%	2,979 ▲3%
2018	675,971 ▲3%	12,914 ▲2%	2,887 ▲28%
2017	654,397 ▲6%	12,631 ▲3%	2,260 ▲19%
2016	617,703 ▼4%	12,219 ▼18%	1,899 ▼9%
2015	644,199 ▼14%	14,916 ▼13%	2,097 ▼1%
2014	634,128 ▲10%	17,242 ▼10%	2,127 ▼7%
2013	576,633	19,172 ▲5%	2,295 ▼26%
2012	579,395 ▲15%	18,266 ▲4%	3,102 ▼27%
2011	503,408 ▲29%	17,534 ▲2%	4,225 ▲27%
2010	389,217 ▲30%	17,161 ▲48%	3,331 ▲20%
2009	298,484 ▲15%	11,603 ▼4%	2,775 ▲10%
2008	259,362 ▲11%	12,104 ▲19%	2,526 ▲24%
2007	232,885	10,192	2,043

Note:
^{a}: 2022 series provided by CCR is incomplete, lacking data for the months of January, February and part of March.

== Access ==
The airport is located 20 km (12 mi) south of downtown Palmas.

== See also ==
- List of airports in Brazil
