= Araguaína Airport =

Araguaína Regional Airport Aeroporto Regional de Araguaína

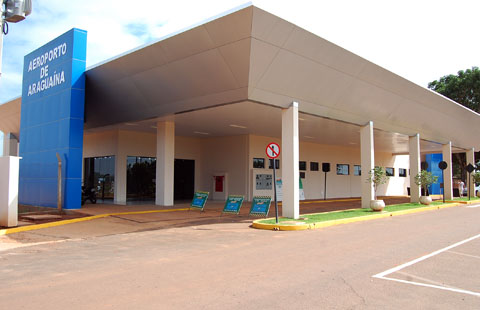
- IATA: AUX; ICAO: SWGN; LID: TO0002

Summary
- Airport type: Public
- Operator: Esaero (?–2025); GRU Airport (2025–Present)
- Serves: Araguaína
- Time zone: BRT (UTC−03:00)
- Elevation AMSL: 236 m (774 ft)
- Coordinates: 07°13′42″S 048°14′27″W

Map
- Location in Brazil

Runways
Direction	Length		Surface
Direction	m	ft	Surface
09/27	1,804	5,919	Asphalt
- Sources: ANAC, DECEA

Araguaína Regional Airport (IATA: AUX, ICAO: SWGN) is the airport serving Araguaína, Brazil.

It is managed by GRU Airport.

== History ==
Previously operated by Esaero, on November 27, 2025 GRU Airport won the concession to operate the airport.

== Airlines and destinations ==
Airlines	Destinations
Gol Linhas Aéreas	Brasília, Palmas (ends 28 February 2027)

== Access ==
The airport is located 8 km (5 mi) from downtown Araguaína.

== Gallery ==
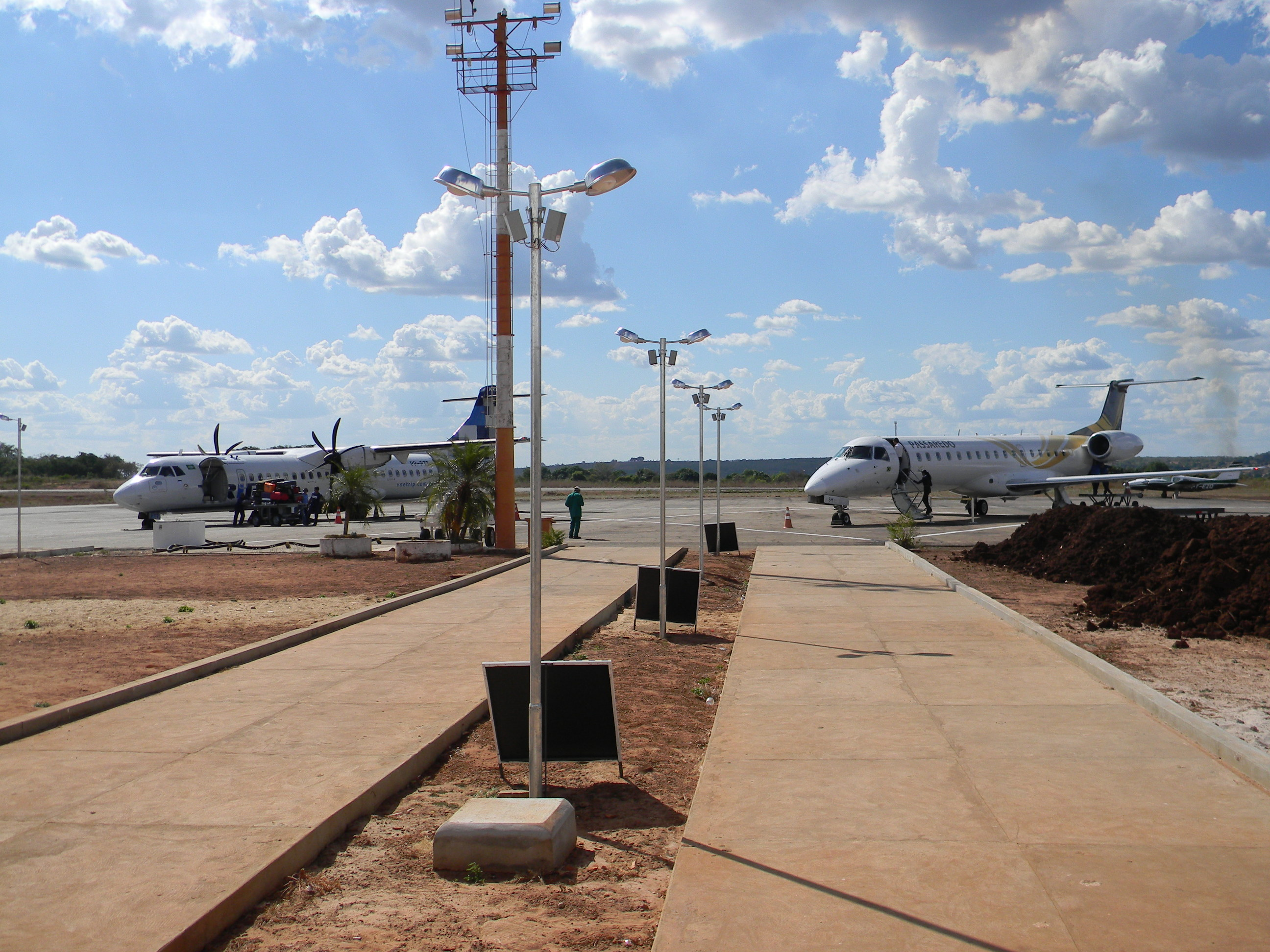

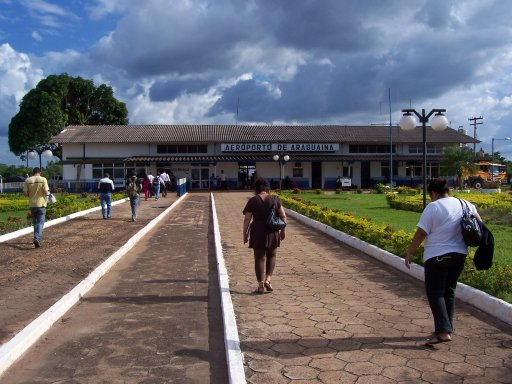

== See also ==
- List of airports in Brazil
