= Lajeado, Tocantins =

Municipality in Tocantins, Brazil

Lajeado
- Municipality
- The Municipality of Lajeado
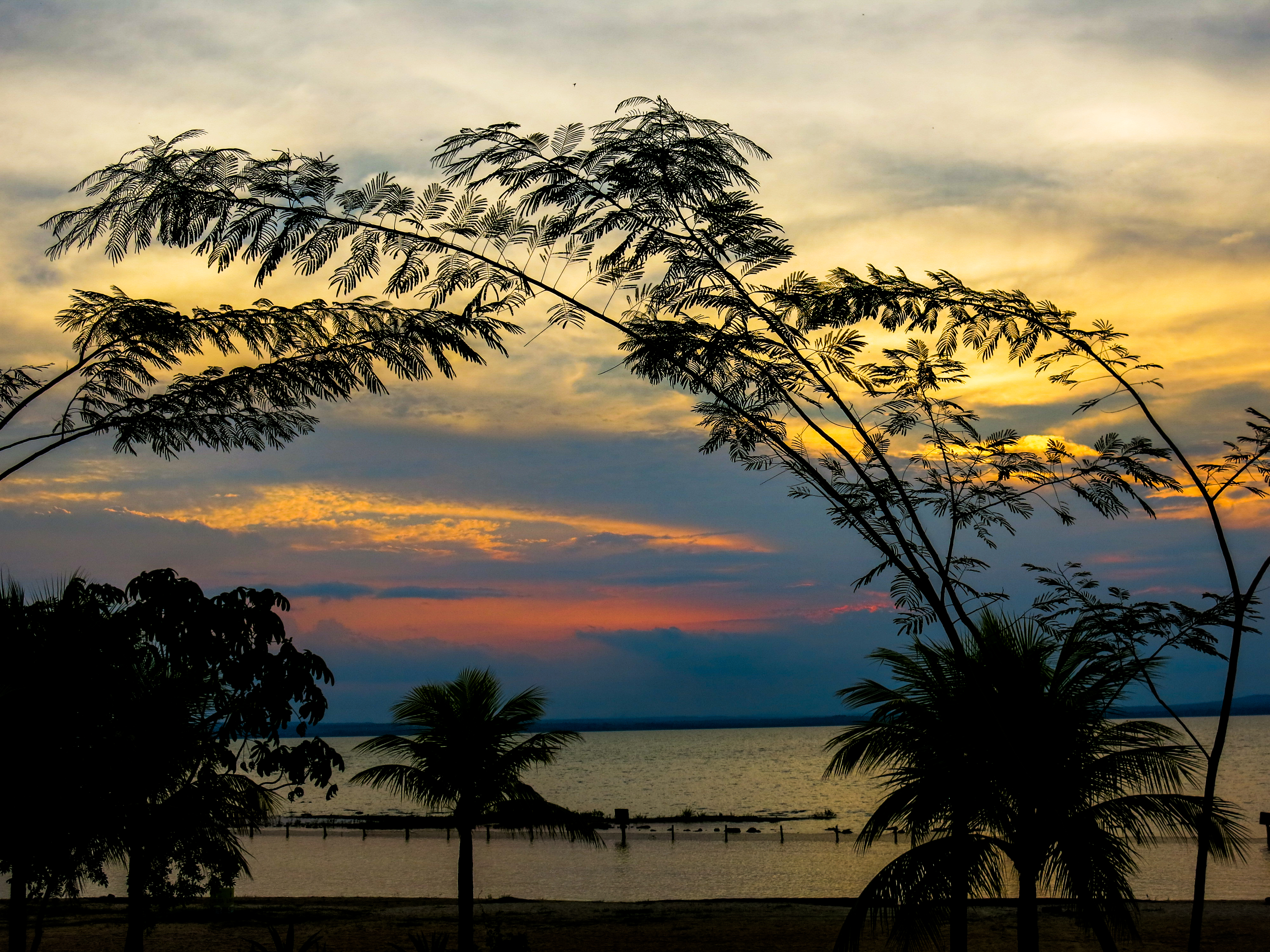

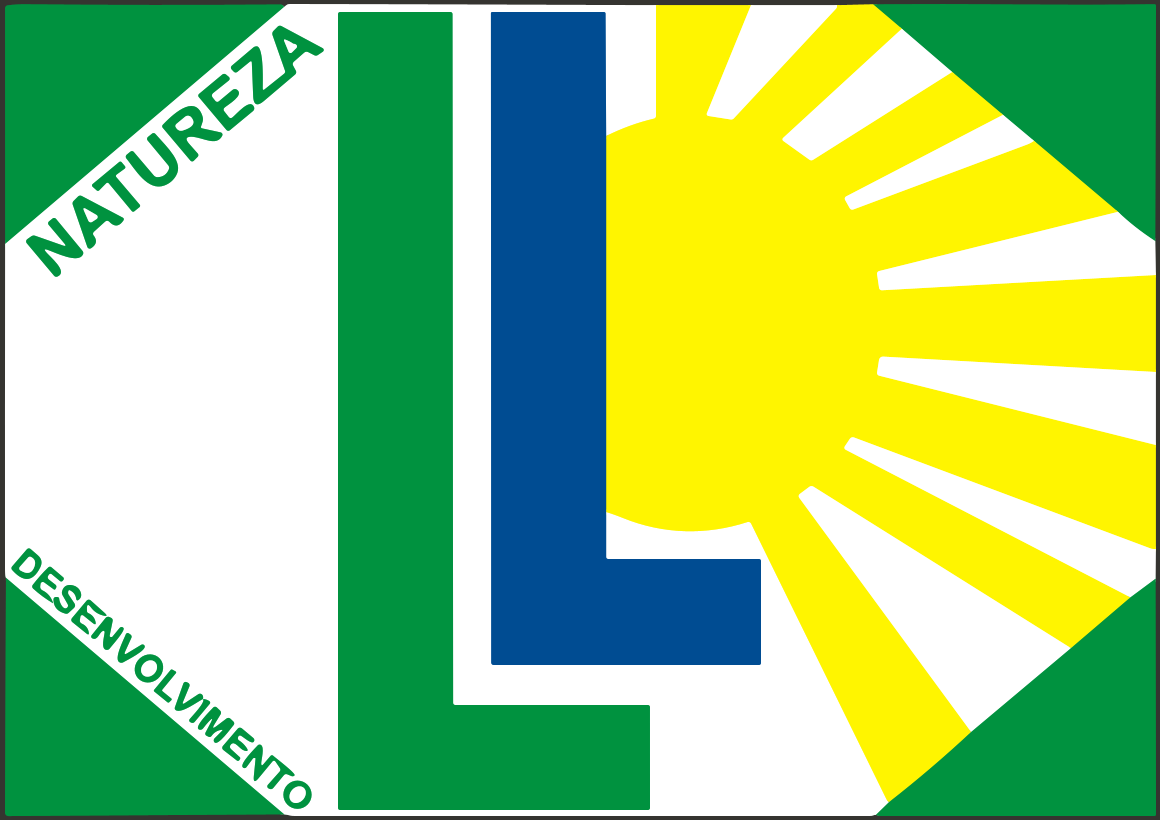
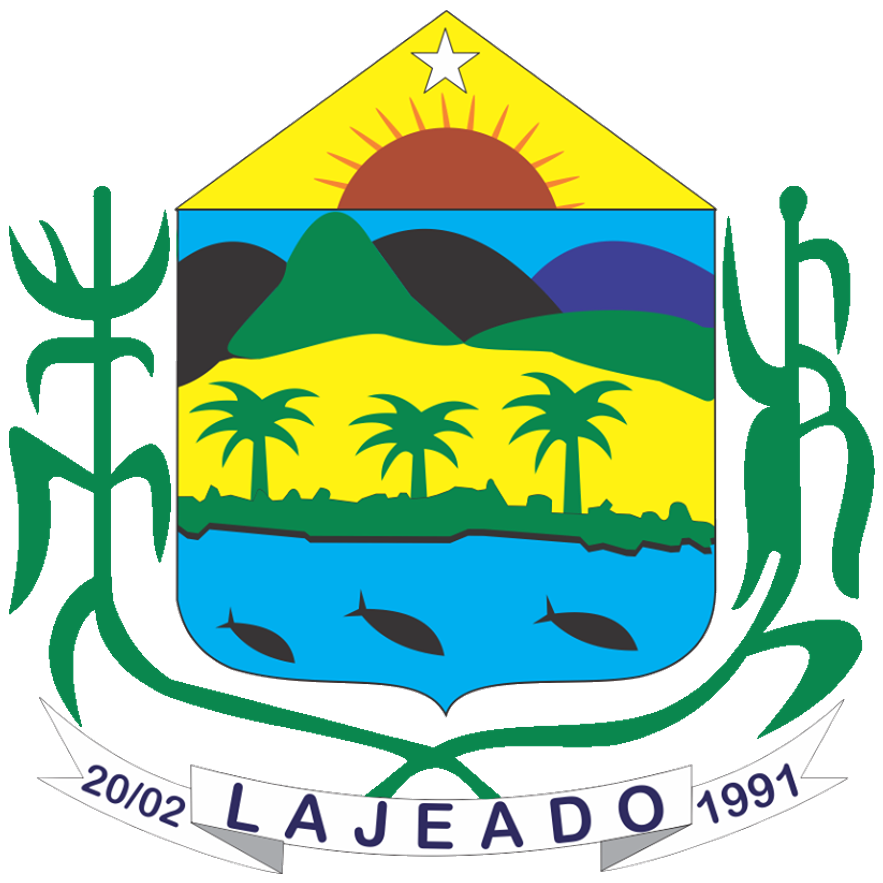
- Flag Coat of arms

- Location of Lajeado in the State of Tocantins
- Coordinates: 09°45′03″S 48°21′28″W
- Country: Brazil
- Region: North
- State: Tocantins
- Founded: February 20, 1991; 35 years ago)

Government
  - Mayor: Júnior Bandeira (PSDB)

Area
  - Total: 322.481 km^{2} (124.511 sq mi)
- Elevation: 202 m (663 ft)

Population (2020)
  - Total: 3,167
  - Density: 9.821/km^{2} (25.44/sq mi)
- Time zone: UTC−3 (BRT)
- HDI (2000): 0.715 – medium
- Website: www.lajeado.to.gov.br

Lajeado is a municipality located in the Brazilian state of Tocantins.

The municipality contains 12% of the 9,931-hectare (24,540-acre) Lajeado State Park.

== See also ==
- List of municipalities in Tocantins
