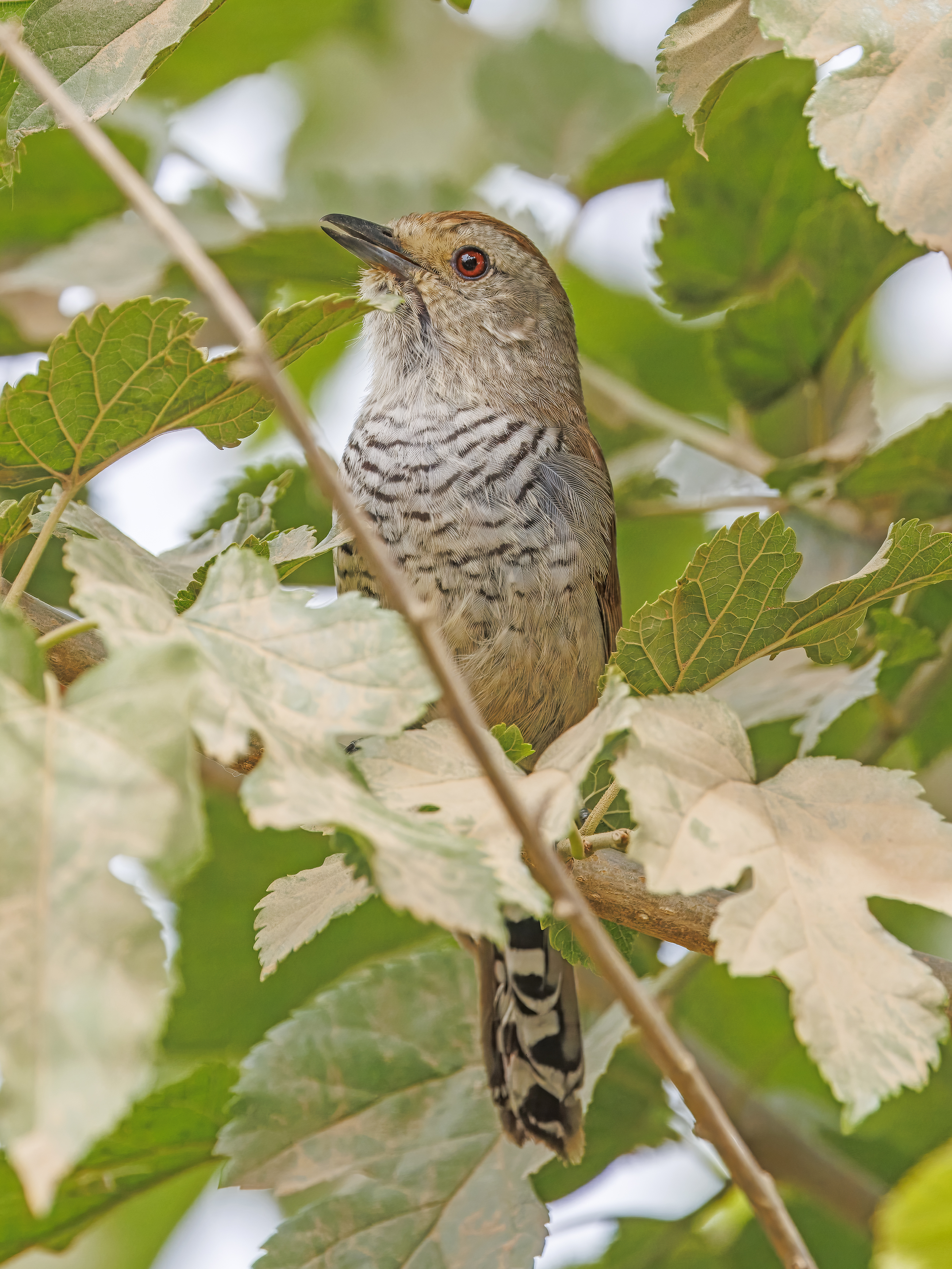
- In Argentina

Conservation status
- Least Concern (IUCN 3.1)

- Least Concern (IUCN 3.1)

Scientific classification
- Kingdom: Animalia
- Phylum: Chordata
- Class: Aves
- Order: Passeriformes
- Family: Thamnophilidae
- Genus: Thamnophilus
- Species: T. ruficapillus

Binomial name
- Thamnophilus ruficapillus Vieillot, 1816

= Rufous-capped antshrike =

Species of bird

The rufous-capped antshrike (Thamnophilus ruficapillus) is a species of bird in subfamily Thamnophilinae of family Thamnophilidae, the "typical antbirds". It is found in Argentina, Bolivia, Brazil, Paraguay, Peru, and Uruguay.

== Taxonomy and systematics ==
The rufous-capped antshrike was described by the French ornithologist Louis Pierre Vieillot in 1816 and given its current binomial name Thamnophilus ruficapillus. It and the rufous-winged antshrike (T. torquatus) are sister species. The South American Classification Committee of the American Ornithological Society is considering a proposal to lump them as a single species.

In addition to the possibility of the lump, the rufous-capped antshrike's taxonomy is further unsettled. The International Ornithological Committee and the Clements taxonomy assign it these five subspecies:

- Thamnophilus ruficapillus jaczewskii Domaniewski, 1925
- Thamnophilus ruficapillus marcapatae Hellmayr, 1912
- Thamnophilus ruficapillus subfasciatus Sclater, PL & Salvin, 1876
- Thamnophilus ruficapillus cochabambae (Chapman, 1921)
- Thamnophilus ruficapillus ruficapillus Vieillot, 1816

However, BirdLife International's Handbook of the Birds of the World (HBW) treats the first three as the "northern rufous-capped antshrike" (T. subfasciatus) and the other two as the "southern rufous-capped antshrike" (T. ruficapillus). Clements does group them as the "Rufous-capped Antshrike (Northern)" and "Rufous-capped Antshrike (Southern)" within the single species.

This article follows the one-species, five-subspecies, model.

== Description ==
The rufous-capped antshrike is 15 to 17 cm (5.9 to 6.7 in) long and weighs 16.3 to 25 g (0.57 to 0.88 oz). Members of genus Thamnophilus are largish members of the antbird family; all have stout bills with a hook like those of true shrikes. This species exhibits significant sexual dimorphism. Adult males of the nominate subspecies T. r. ruficapillus have a chestnut crown and a buffy gray face and throat with faint dusky mottling and bars. Their upperparts are dark brown. Their wings are rufous-brown. Their tail is brownish black with white tips and bars on the inner webs of the outer feathers. Their underparts are mostly buff-tinged white, with black bars on the breast and sides. Their flanks and undertail coverts are buff with an olive tinge. Adult females are much like males but have a cinnamon-brown crown, a rufous-brown tail with no white, and faint or no barring on their breast.

Males of subspecies T. r. cochabambae have a chestnut crown, a buffy white face and throat with light gray streaks, medium gray upperparts, and a more extensively barred tail than the nominate. Their breast and sides are buffy with black bars, their belly buffish white, and their flanks and undertail coverts a mix of light buff and gray. Females have olivaceous upperparts. Their underparts are whitish with a buff tinge on their breast and sides and an olive-buff tinge on their flanks and undertail coverts. Males of subspecies T. r. subfasciatus have a darker rufous cap than the nominate, a darkish gray face, throat, and upperparts, and buff-tinged white underparts that are barred from breast to belly. Females have rufous rather than the nominates' whitish underparts. Males of T. r. jaczewskii have a darker gray face and throat than subfasciatus, olive-tinged dark gray upperparts, and chestnut wings. Their underparts are barred with black and white and their flanks have an olive tinge. Females have olivaceous upperparts and bright buff underparts that are paler on the belly. Males of T. r. marcapatae have a dark gray face, upperparts, and flanks. Their lower throat and underparts are streaked black and white; the black bars are heavier than those of jaczewskii. Females have dark olive-brown upperparts. Their underparts are reddish yellow-brown that is paler on the throat and belly and has some gray mixed in on the flanks.

== Distribution and habitat ==
The rufous-capped antshrike has a disjunct distribution. The subspecies are found thus:

- Thamnophilus ruficapillus jaczewskii: Andes of northern Peru in the departments of Cajamarca, Amazonas, and San Martín
- Thamnophilus ruficapillus marcapatae: eastern slope of the Andes of southern Peru in Cuzco and Puno departments
- Thamnophilus ruficapillus subfasciatus: eastern slope of the Andes of northwestern Bolivia's La Paz and western Cochabamba departments
- Thamnophilus ruficapillus cochabambae: eastern slope of the Andes from eastern Cochabamba in Bolivia southeast through Santa Cruz Department into northwestern Argentina as far as Tucumán Province
- Thamnophilus ruficapillus ruficapillus: southeastern Brazil from eastern Minas Gerais and Espírito Santo south and west into eastern Paraguay, northeastern Argentina as far as Buenos Aires Province, and Uruguay

The rufous-capped antshrike inhabits a variety of landscapes that differ geographically. In the Andes of Peru and northern Bolivia it occurs in semi-humid montane forest, secondary forest, and scrublands. It favors the forest edge but in northern Peru it also occurs in its interior. In the Andes from southern Bolivia into Argentina it continues in those habitats but also occurs in scrub and forest along watercourses in more open areas. In lower elevations in Brazil, Uruguay, Paraguay, and Argentina it shuns the interior of forest and more often occurs in isolated patches of shrubs and small trees. It also occurs there in scrublands, hedgerows, brushy areas, and the edges of urban areas. In elevation it ranges from sea level to 2,400 m (7,900 ft) in Brazil. In Peru it occurs between 1,800 and 3,000 m (5,900 and 9,800 ft) and in Bolivia between 600 and 2,700 m (2,000 and 8,900 ft). In Argentina it occurs somewhat lower than in Bolivia.

== Behavior ==
=== Movement ===
The rufous-capped antshrike is presumed to be a year-round resident in most of its range, but some individuals in the far south may move north in the austral winter.

=== Feeding ===
The rufous-capped antshrike's diet has not been detailed but is mostly insects; fruits are also eaten. It usually forages singly and in pairs, mostly in the understorey within 2 m (7 ft) of the ground though sometimes as high as 7 m (23 ft). It hops through vegetation, gleaning prey from leaves, stems, vines, and branches by reaching and sometimes making short upward sallies from a perch. It has been observed dropping to the ground to pick prey from the surface of leaf litter.

=== Breeding ===
Nothing is known about the breeding biology of the three "northern" subspecies of the rufous-capped antshrike. The breeding season of the southern two subspecies spans from October to February with some regional variation. The nest is a cup of plant fibers and rootlets and is usually suspended in a branch fork. The nominate subspecies' clutch size is three eggs though sometimes two; it is unknown for the other subspecies. The incubation period, time to fledging, and details of parental care are not known. At least in Argentina, the shiny cowbird (Molothrus bonariensis) is a nest parasite.

=== Vocalization ===
The rufous-capped antshrike's song apparently has some regional variations that have not been studied. It has been described as a "slightly accelerating series of 12-15 'tjew' notes". It has been written as "wah, nyah, nyah-nyah-nya-nya-nya'nya-arr" and as "weepweepweepweepweepweepeepeepeep". Its calls might also vary; they include an "upslurred whistle" and a "loud raspy 'chirr' upslurred at end" and "a low, rasping snarl aarrrr" and "a rising whine".

== Status ==
The IUCN follows HBW taxonomy and so has separately assessed the "northern" and "southern" rufous-capped antshrikes. Both are assessed as being of Least Concern. Neither population size is known and both are believed to be decreasing. No immediate threats to either have been identified. The species is considered fairly common in most of its range though rare in Paraguay and northern Peru. It occurs in several protected areas in Brazil and Argentina. Its "[a]bility to utilize shrubby thickets, forest edge and other forms of second growth renders [the] species of low sensitivity to disturbance".
