= Palmas, Tocantins =

Capital city of Tocantins, Brazil

Palmas
- Municipality
- Município de Palmas; Municipality of Palmas
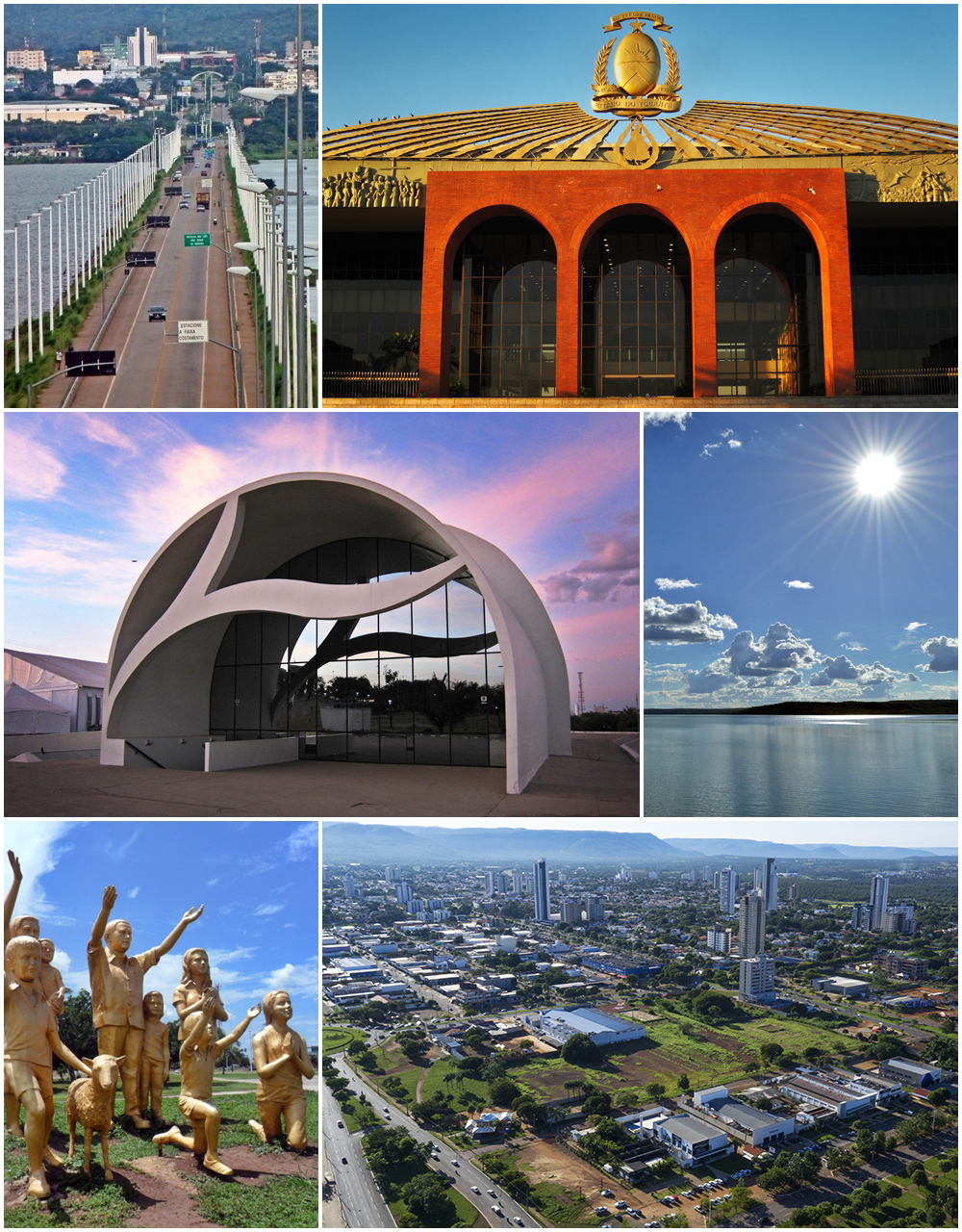
- From the top; clockwise: Tocantins River Bridge; Araguaia Palace; Tocantins River; Aerial view of Palmas; Súplica dos Pioneiros monument and Coluna Prestes Memorial.

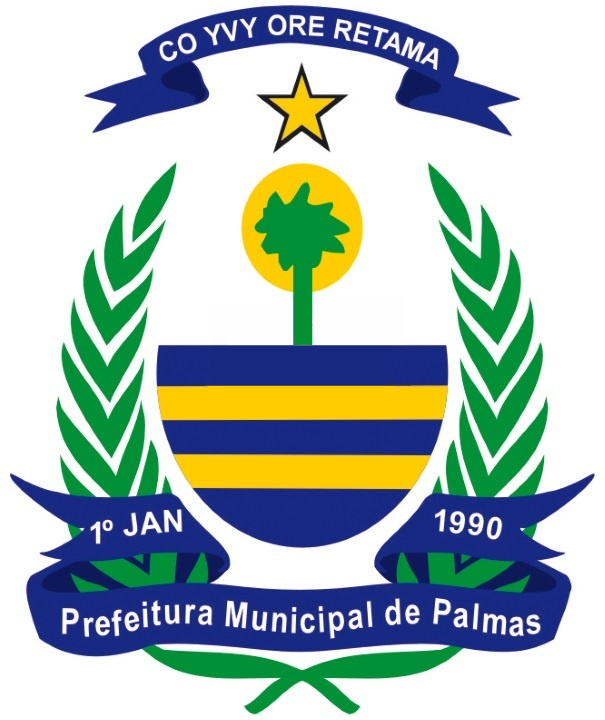
- Flag Coat of arms
- Nickname: Capital Ecológica (Ecological Capital)
- Motto: Co Yvy Ore Retama (Tupi for 'This Land is Ours'; in Portuguese: Esta Terra é Nossa)
- Localization of Palmas in Tocantins

- Localization of Palmas in Brazil
- Coordinates: 10°11′04″S 48°20′01″W
- Country: Brazil
- Region: North
- State: Tocantins
- Founded: May 20, 1989

Government
  - Mayor: Eduardo Siqueira Campos (PSDB)
  - Vice Mayor: Carlos Velozo

Area
  - Total: 2,218.93 km^{2} (856.73 sq mi)
- Elevation: 230 m (750 ft)

Population (2025)
  - Total: 328,499
  - Density: 148.044/km^{2} (383.432/sq mi)
- Demonym: Palmense
- Time zone: UTC−3 (BRT)
- Postal Code: From 77000-001 to 77249-999
- Area code: +55 63
- HDI (2010): 0.788 – high
- Website: www.palmas.to.gov.br

Palmas (Brazilian Portuguese pronunciation: [ˈpawmɐs], Palm trees; Akwẽ-Xerénte: Akwẽ krikahâzawre wam hã [akwẽ kɾikahəʐawɾɛ wam hə̃]) is the capital and largest city of the state of Tocantins, Brazil. According to IBGE estimates from 2020, the city had 306,296 inhabitants. Palmas has a metropolitan area with 471,639 inhabitants.

Palmas was founded in 1990 and developed from the ground up in a former agricultural area as the capital of the new state of Tocantins, formed under the 1988 constitution. It was intended to develop a relatively undeveloped area of the nation to provide better jobs for people. The city has a well-designed road system, and its urban zoning is modeled on that of Brasília, the national capital. A symmetrical park lies at the city centre, and a large central avenue similar to Brasília's Monumental Axis extends north to south. The city is home to the Federal University of Tocantins.

In 2002, the Lajeado Hydroelectric Power Plant was completed on the Tocantins River, creating a large reservoir and giving the city new beaches. The project also included construction of a huge bridge: the Fernando Henrique Cardoso Bridge, 8 kilometers (5.0 mi) long, connects Palmas with the major highway BR-153 and the district of Luzimangues in Porto Nacional.

The Palmas Airport connects Palmas with many Brazilian cities.

== History ==
Tocantins's capital, Miracema do Tocantins, was replaced by Palmas upon the city's creation during 1990.

== Geography ==
Tocantins is a state between the Amazon rainforest and the coastal savanna. As a result, its geography is varied. Many rivers cross through the state (including the Tocantins River). Researchers have identified more than 20 archaeologically significant sites of early indigenous cultures in the state.

The municipality contains 88% of the 9,931-hectare (24,540-acre) Lajeado State Park.

=== Climate ===
Most of Tocantins, including where Palmas is located, (except the extreme west and northern regions) is situated within a vast Brazilian area known as the cerrado. The cerrado region's typical climate is hot, semi-humid, with pronounced seasonality marked by a dry winter season from May through September. The annual rainfall is around 800 to 1600 mm. The soils are generally very old, deep, and naturally nutrient-poor.

Palmas is one of the hottest capital cities in Brazil. During the May to September dry season, Palmas can be oppressively hot as temperatures climb into the high 30s (°C). During the October to April rainy season, it is not as hot. The heavy rains and cloud cover keep it much cooler. Palmas receives generous rainfall of about 1,300 mm. It is situated in a 'bow' valley of Rio Tocantins and surrounded by mountains from three sides; with its low elevation, 195 metres above sea level, these factors increase the humidity and discomfort of hot days.

Due to the city's location at 10S, it technically celebrates Christmas and New Year in summer. However summer (December to February) is the rainiest and coldest season in the year. The heavy summer rain can cool down the maximum temperature in summer a lot. In contrast with the rainy and cloudy summer, winter (June to August) has almost no rain and most of winter days are sunny. Spring (September to November) and autumn (March to May) are the transitions between dry and wet periods. Spring is the hottest season, with September daily average temperatures soar up over 30 degrees Celsius.

Climate data for Palmas (1991–2020)
Month	Jan	Feb	Mar	Apr	May	Jun	Jul	Aug	Sep	Oct	Nov	Dec	Year
Mean daily maximum °C (°F)	31.8 (89.2)	31.6 (88.9)	31.8 (89.2)	32.8 (91.0)	33.8 (92.8)	34.5 (94.1)	35.2 (95.4)	36.8 (98.2)	37.3 (99.1)	35.1 (95.2)	33.0 (91.4)	32.3 (90.1)	33.8 (92.8)
Daily mean °C (°F)	26.1 (79.0)	26.1 (79.0)	26.2 (79.2)	26.7 (80.1)	27.0 (80.6)	26.5 (79.7)	26.5 (79.7)	28.2 (82.8)	29.5 (85.1)	28.1 (82.6)	27.0 (80.6)	26.5 (79.7)	27.0 (80.6)
Mean daily minimum °C (°F)	22.3 (72.1)	22.3 (72.1)	22.5 (72.5)	22.7 (72.9)	22.1 (71.8)	20.3 (68.5)	19.6 (67.3)	20.9 (69.6)	23.4 (74.1)	23.1 (73.6)	22.7 (72.9)	22.6 (72.7)	22.0 (71.6)
Average precipitation mm (inches)	298.6 (11.76)	260.0 (10.24)	264.0 (10.39)	179.8 (7.08)	60.5 (2.38)	6.3 (0.25)	0.9 (0.04)	1.3 (0.05)	46.2 (1.82)	143.9 (5.67)	223.6 (8.80)	264.5 (10.41)	1,749.6 (68.88)
Average precipitation days (≥ 1 mm)	13	13	11	7	2	0	0	0	2	8	12	13	81
Average relative humidity (%)	80.9	80.8	82.0	78.5	70.8	59.2	50.9	43.7	47.8	65.6	75.0	78.1	67.8
Mean monthly sunshine hours	152.8	136.9	148.8	181.1	239.2	273.3	297.1	292.0	237.2	194.8	164.1	159.7	2,477
Source: Instituto Nacional de Meteorologia (precipitation days 1961–1990)

=== Vegetation ===
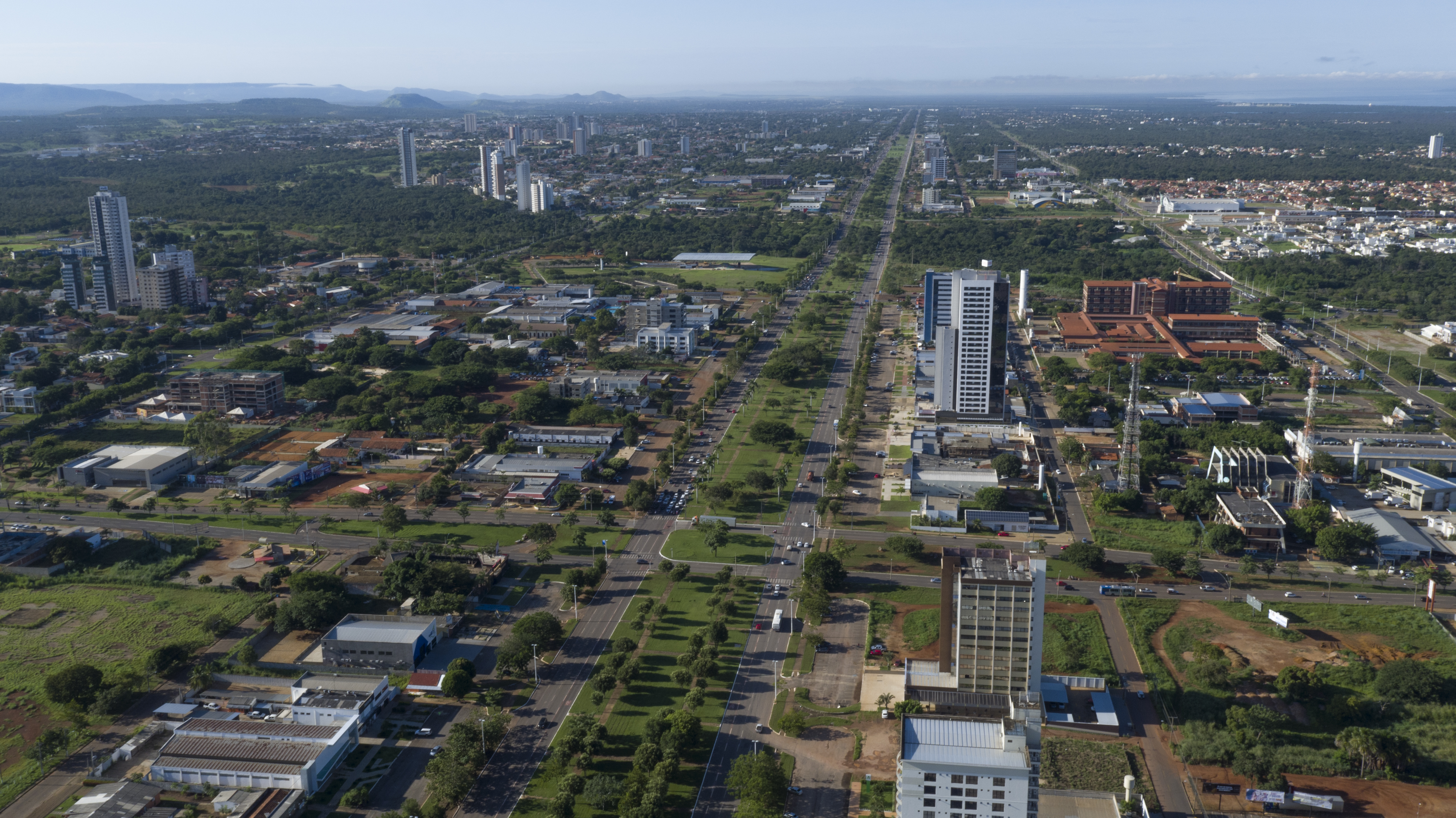
View of Palmas.

In spite of being technically located in a watershed of the Amazon basin, Palmas has no rainforest. Typical are short shrubland trees common to a cerrado region. While the city layout was being developed, builders preserved many of the original trees, left intact in green areas along the widely spaced avenues. Many street trees in Palmas are much older than the city, which was started in 1990. Man-planted palms also grace the main thoroughfare, Avenida JK.

== Economy ==
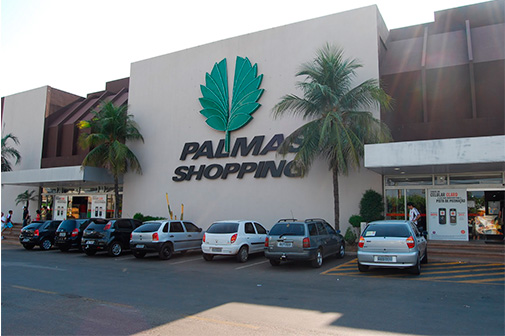
A shopping mall in Palmas.

Palmas was designed to be the economic and administrative center of Tocantins. The service sector is the main driver of the economy. The share of agriculture in the economy is less than the service sector, being based on small farms around the city and the highways that provide access to Palmas. Larger farms, which cultivate soybeans and raise livestock, are located in the district of Buritirana.

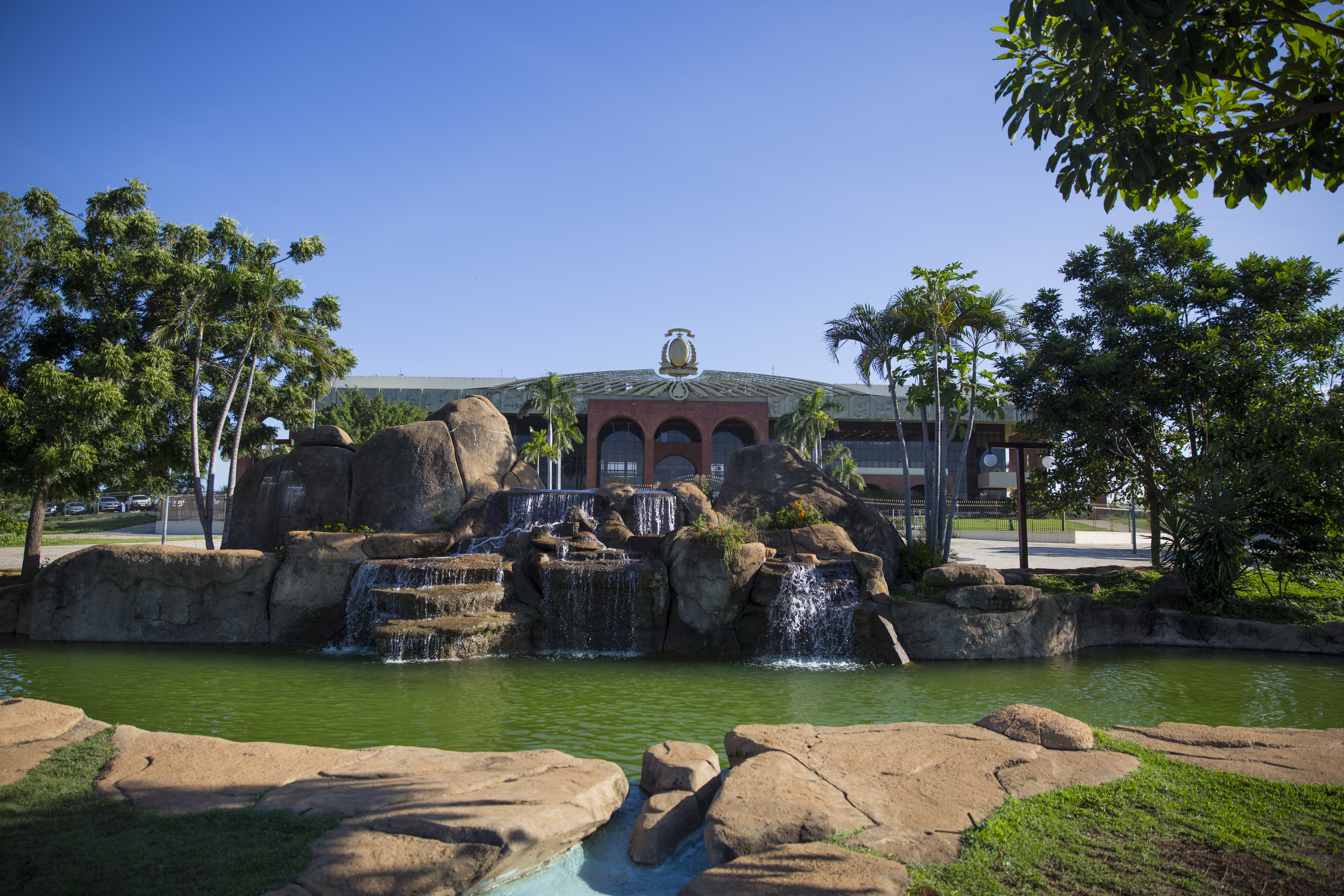
Girassóis Square in Palmas.

The economy is mostly formal, consisting primarily of limited partnerships and sole proprietorships. Micro firms are the most common in the city, where they comprise over 80% of the 4394 companies. The city has four industrial districts, among them the Industrial District of Palmas, Tocantins Industrial District I Industrial District, and Industrial District Tocantins II of Taquaralto. All are located along the highways and TO-050 TO-010.

Today Palmas city has become a center whose trade and economic influence covers the entire state of Tocantins, in addition to the southeastern Pará, the northeastern Mato Grosso, and the southern Maranhão.

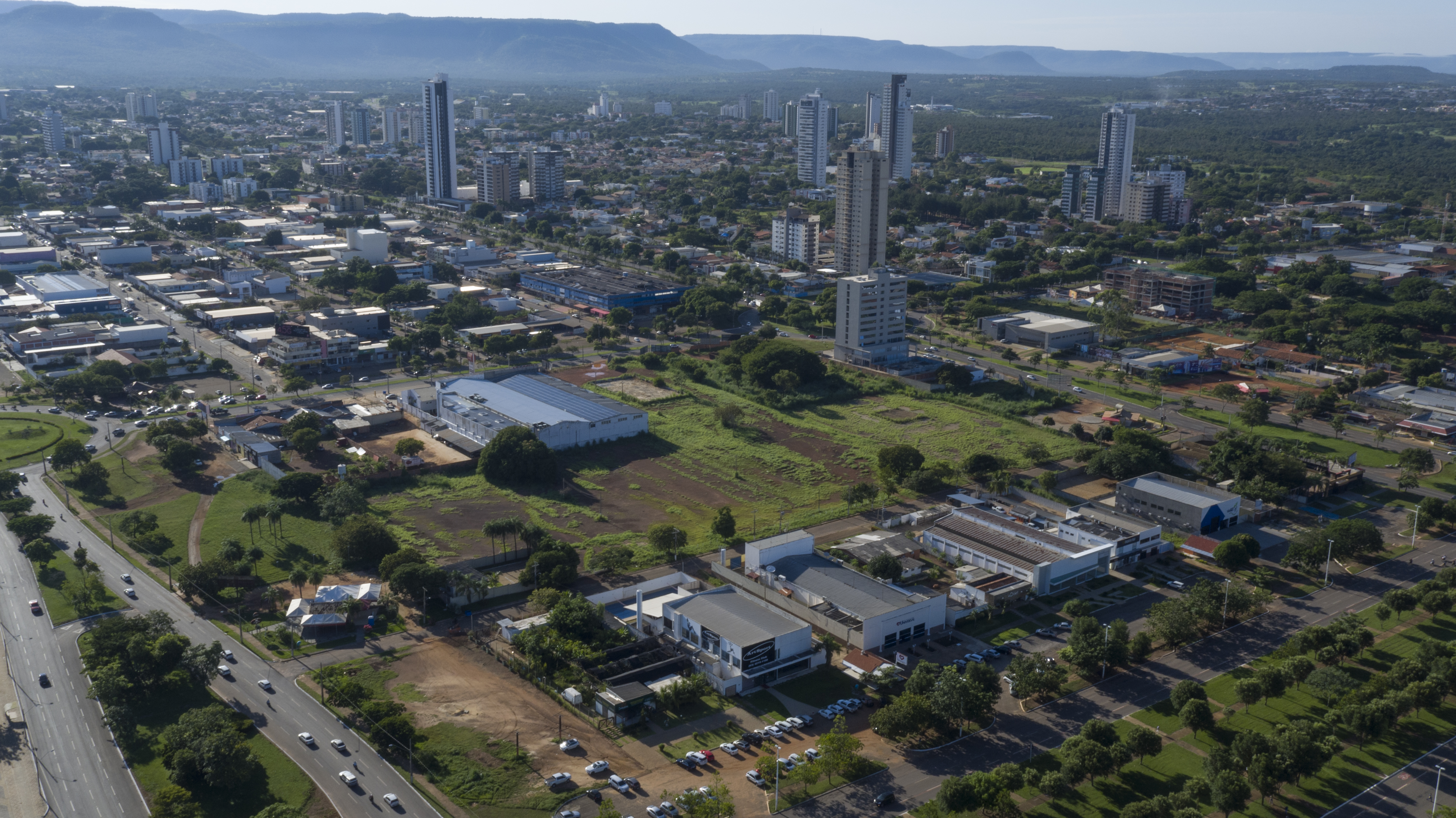
Aerial view of Palmas.

In 2007 the Gross Domestic Product had a strong expansion was estimated at $2.2 billion, driven by investments of the City of Palms in the economy. The increase in GDP of Palmas was 6% and, compared to that of Brazil was very considerable, as the country showed the percentage of 3.5%. By the end of 2007, and capital represented 18.4% of the wealth generated by Tocantins and 0.08% in the country. Due to this growth, Palmas has attracted major investments, such as the Capim Dourado Shopping (inaugurated in August/2010), the multimodal yard of the north–south (located in the municipality of Porto Nacional, on the banks of the TO-080), plus branches of hypermarket networks: Atacadão, Makro and Assaí.

== Governance ==
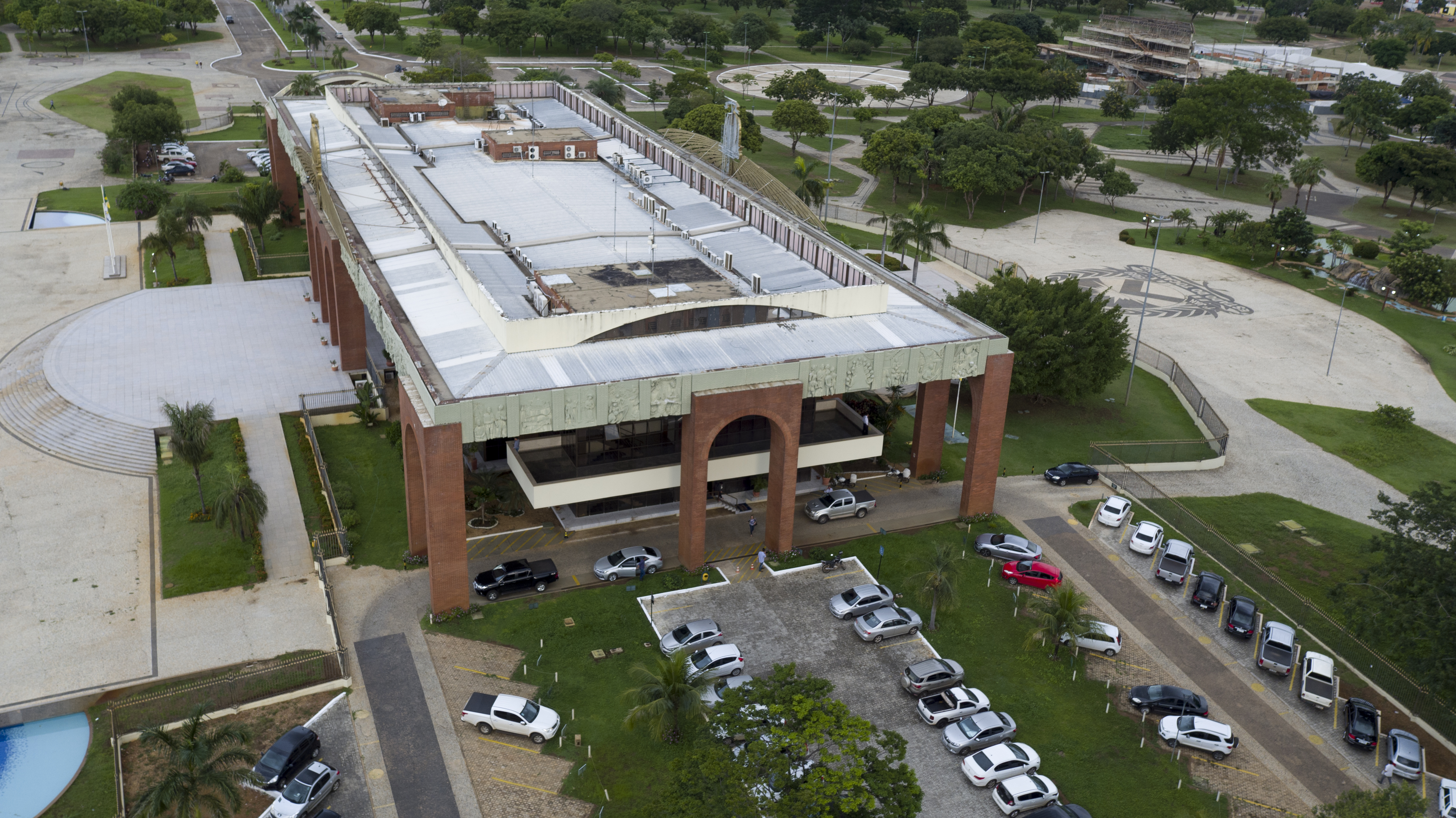
Government House of Tocantins.

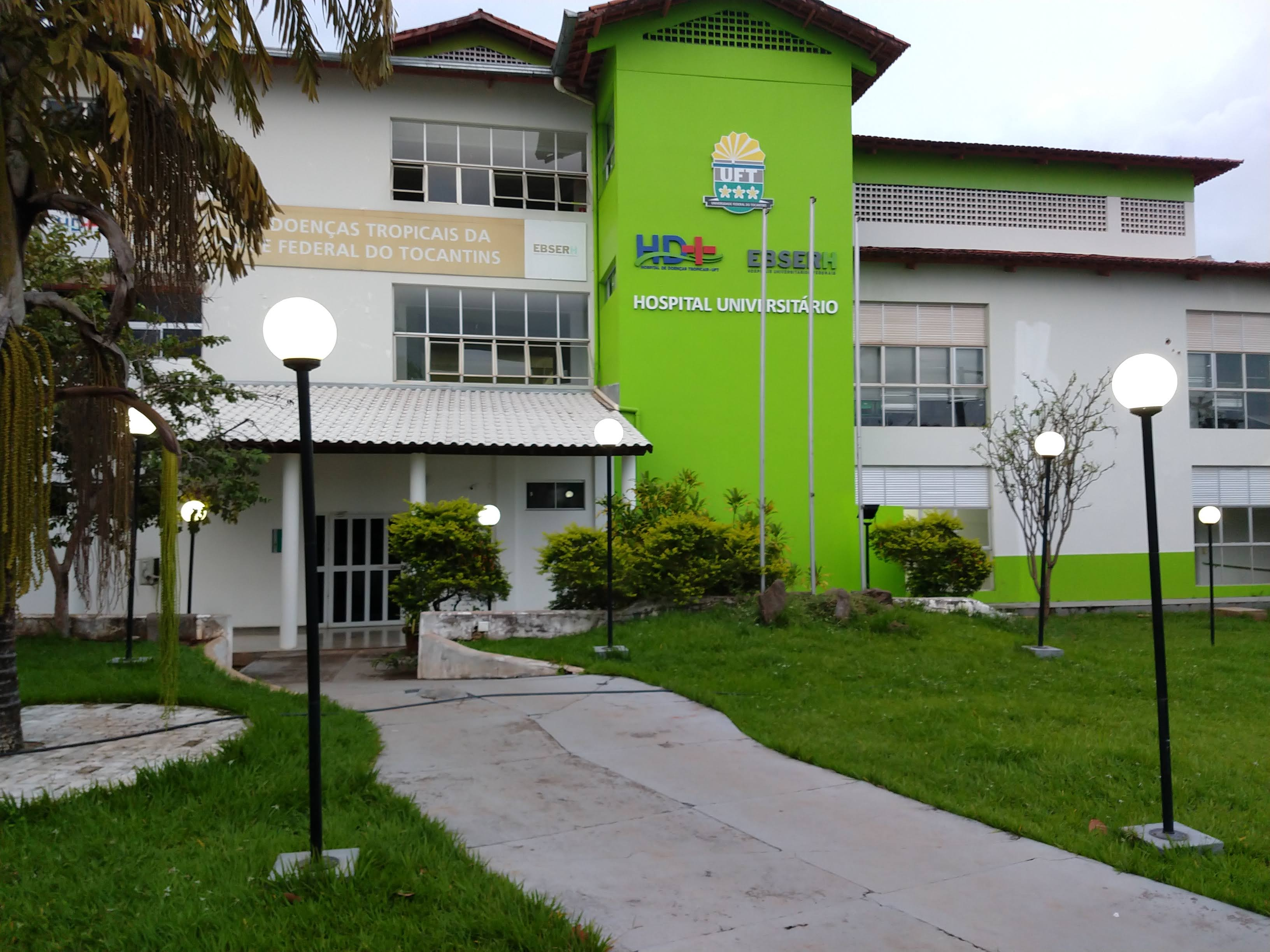
A public hospital in Palmas.

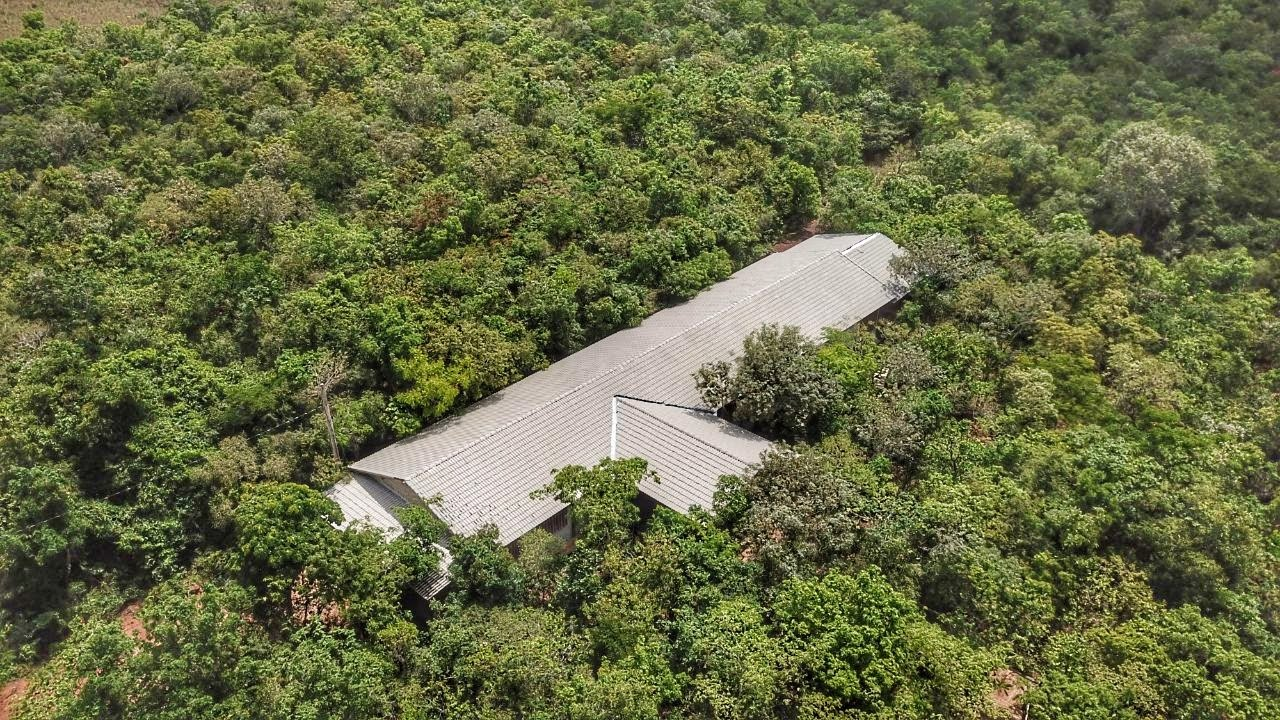
Federal University of Tocantins Fire Monitoring Center.

As in all cities in Brazil, Palmas has separate Executive and Legislative branches of local government, represented by the Mayor of Palmas and the Local Assembly, respectively. Since its founding, Palmas has had 5 elected Mayors. The current incumbent is Cinthia Ribeiro, who succeeded Carlos Amastha (PP).

=== Mayors ===
- Fenelon Barbosa, 1990–1992
- Eduardo Siqueira Campos, 1993-1996
- Odir Rocha, 1997–2000
- Nilmar Ruiz, 2001-2004
- Raul Filho, 2005–2012
- Carlos Amastha, 2013-2018
- Cinthia Ribeiro, 2018–2024
- Eduardo Siqueira Campos, 2025-

== Demographics ==
=== Sister cities ===
- Araguaína, Tocantins, Brazil
- Colorado Springs, Colorado, United States

== Education ==
Educational institutions include:

- Universidade Federal do Tocantins (UFT)
- Centro Universitário Luterano de Palmas (Ceulp-Ulbra)
- Faculdade Católica do Tocantins (Católica do Tocantins)
- Fundação Universidade do Tocantins (Unitins)
- Faculdade Objetivo

== Tourism ==
Palmas is close to Taquaruçu, an ecotourism resort and village located in the hills. Its cooler microclimate and natural surroundings attract many tourists from Palmas, other regions of Brazil and abroad. Taquaruçu is famous for the many waterfalls (cachoeiras) surrounding it, where tourists can swim and also practice sports like rappel.

== Transport ==
Palmas is served by a local public bus service and an interstate bus service. Rodoviaria (central bus station) is located at the edge of city, with connections to all capitals of Brazil.

=== Airport ===
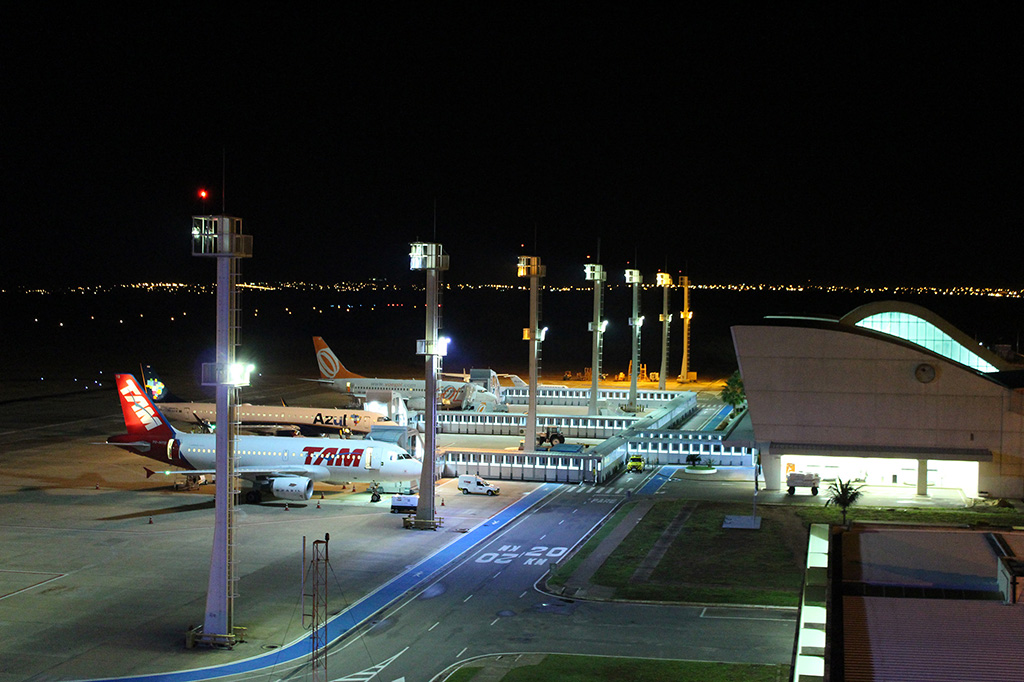
Palmas Airport.

The city is served by the Palmas Airport. Planned for a population of one million, Palmas airport is uncrowded, with only a few flights per day, mostly to and from Brasília. The airport is 30 km from city center, and is served by city bus (2 buses).

=== Highways ===
The Rodovia Coluna Prestes (TO-050) connects the city with Brasília. The Federal Highway (BR-153) connects Palmas north and south through a 60 km drive west to Paraiso de Tocantins. BR-153 is mostly not twinned. The arterial avenues of the city is the Avenida Teotônio Segurado, connecting the North Director Plan with Taquaralto, on the South Palmas, and Avenida Juscelino Kubitschek, connecting the west of Palmas and Ponte Fernando Henrique Cardoso with the state highway TO-050.

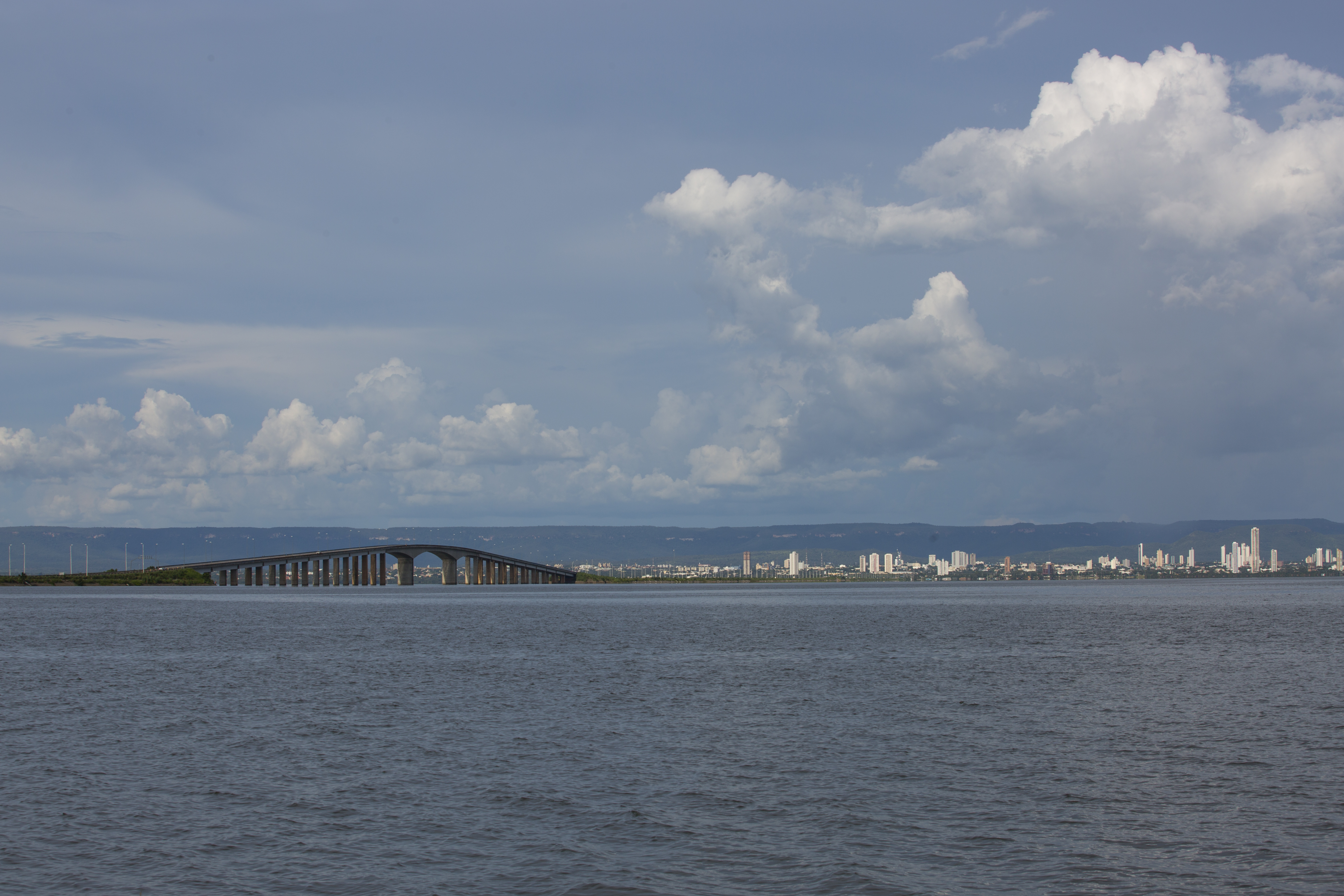
Fernando Henrique Cardoso Bridge and Tocantins River.

=== Railway ===
There is no passenger rail service to Palmas. The newly constructed North-South Railway (Ferrovia Norte-Sul), runs near Palmas. It is intended to alleviate Brazil's heavy truck traffic and to carry bulk goods to ports in North-Eastern Brazil.

== Sports ==
In sports, the most notable football club in the city is Palmas FR, which plays at the Nilton Santos Stadium. Palmas has several sports and entertainment clubs, with swimming pools, other sports and cultural programs, clubs such as AABB and SESC.

In August 2014 Palmas was chosen as the first host city of the World Indigenous Games, a multisport competition held in September 2015.

== See also ==
- World Indigenous Games
