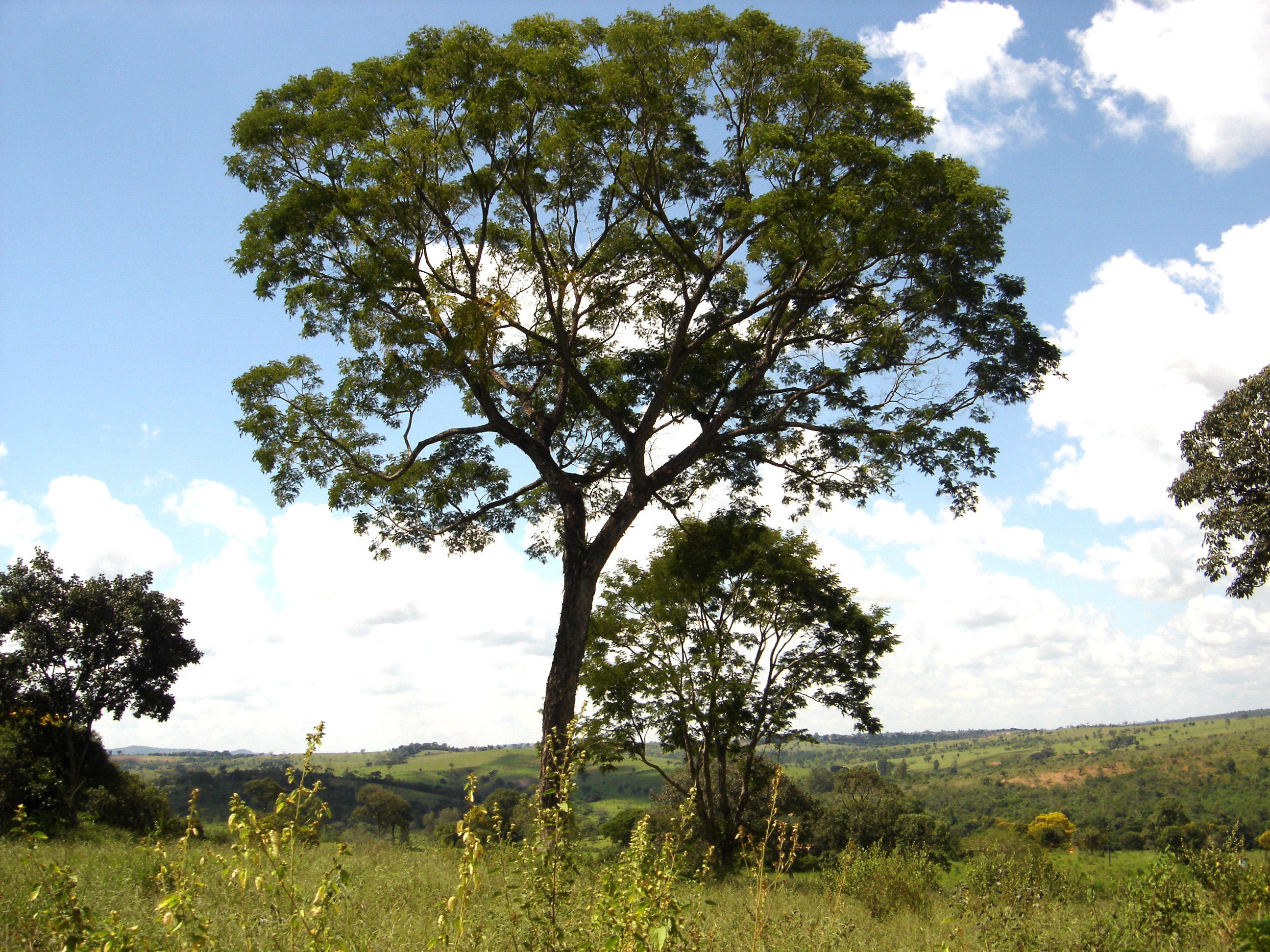
- Mature tree
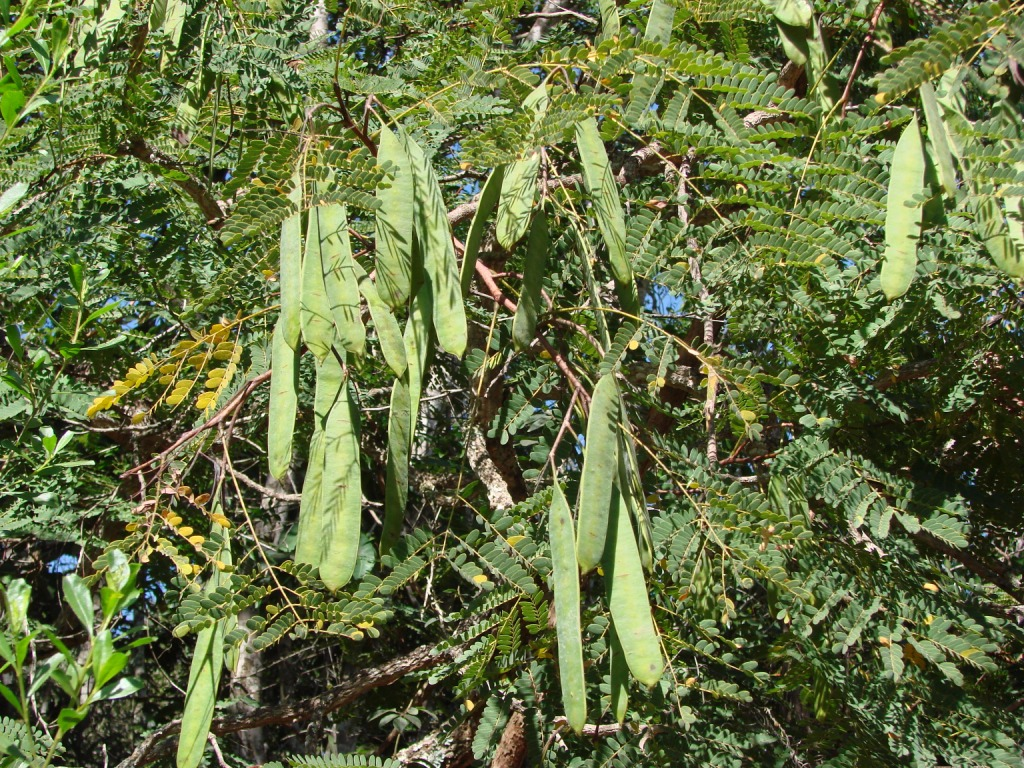
- Seed pods

Conservation status
- Least Concern (IUCN 3.1)

Scientific classification
- Kingdom: Plantae
- Clade: Tracheophytes
- Clade: Angiosperms
- Clade: Eudicots
- Clade: Rosids
- Order: Fabales
- Family: Fabaceae
- Subfamily: Caesalpinioideae
- Clade: Mimosoid clade
- Genus: Plathymenia; Benth. (1840), nom. cons.
- Species: P. reticulata

Binomial name
- Plathymenia reticulata Benth. (1841)

Synonyms
- Chrysoxylon Casar. (1843); Echyrospermum Schott (1823), nom. rej.; Pirottantha Speg. (1916); Chrysoxylon vinhatico Casar. (1843); Pirottantha modesta Speg. (1916); Plathymenia foliolosa Benth. (1841); Plathymenia foliolosa var. paraguariensis Chodat & Hassl. (1904); Plathymenia modesta (Speg.) Burkart (1939)

= Plathymenia =

Genus of legumes

Plathymenia reticulata (Portuguese: vinhático) is a species of legume native to much of eastern South America. It is placed in its own genus, Platyhymenia, although other species have previously been recognised in that genus. It grows up to 30 m (98 ft) tall, and has distinctive flattened seed pods. Its wood is rot-resistant, and is widely used as a structural timber.

== Description ==
Plathymenia reticulata grows up to 30 metres (100 ft) tall, with a diameter at breast height (d.b.h.) of up to 1.5 m (4.9 ft); in cerrado or savannah habitats, it is smaller, reaching a height of only 5 m (16 ft) and a d.b.h. of 30 cm (12 in). The leaves are alternately arranged, 15–20 cm (6–8 in) long, and bipinnate. The hermaphroditic flowers are held in cymes on short peduncles among the foliage; each flower is 5–7 mm (0.20–0.28 in) long, with five tiny white petals and numerous stamens. The seed pod is flat, 10–25 cm (3.9–9.8 in) long and 1.5–4.5 cm (0.6–1.8 in) wide, and contains 7–12 seeds, each of which is surrounded by a winged papery envelope.

== Distribution and ecology ==
Plathymenia reticulata is a widespread tree in the cerrado and Atlantic Forest biomes of South America, but is not found in the more xeric caatinga biome. It occurs in Suriname, Bolivia, Paraguay, the Misiones Province of Argentina and 14 states of Brazil, at altitudes of 30–1,300 metres (100–4,300 ft).

The phenology of P. reticulata varies across its range; in São Paulo state, flowering occurs from July to October, but elsewhere it is can start as late as November, and end as late as December. Similarly, the time of fruiting varies from August–September to October–January. The pollinators are bees and other small insects, and the seeds are dispersed by the wind (anemochory).

== Taxonomy ==
When he erected the genus in 1841, George Bentham originally described two species in Plathymenia – Plathymenia foliolosa and Plathymenia reticulata. Following work by Warwick and Lewis published in 2003, these are now considered synonymous, and Plathymenia is considered to contain a single species. The name Plathymenia derives from the Ancient Greek roots πλατύς (platys, meaning "flat") and ὑμήν (hymen, meaning "membrane"), in reference to the winged seeds. The specific epithet reticulata refers to the reticulate (net-like) leaf venation.

The name Echyrospermum, published by Heinrich Wilhelm Schott in 1822, is an earlier name for the same genus, but has been rejected under the International Code of Botanical Nomenclature.

== Uses ==
Plathymenia reticulata is known by many different common names throughout its wide range, but it is generally referred to as vinhático. The timber of P. reticulata contains terpenes that preserve the wood from termite attack and from rotting, even when exposed to the weather. It is the preferred timber for constructing dugout canoes in Brazil, and is widely used for anchors, fence-posts and for many other structural uses. The production of nectar and pollen for the pollinators make Plathymenia useful for apiculture.
