= Taquaruçu =

Coordinates: 10°19′S 48°9′W

Taquarussu (also written as Taquaruçu) is a village of the Brazilian state of Tocantins, located 30 km. from the capital of Tocantins, Palmas.

Famous for its many waterfalls, surrounded by an impressive natural environment, it's an ecotourism destination.

Its friendly population is famous for its handcrafts industry, mostly using local natural resources like Capim dourado, Babaçu, and seeds from local plants.
