= Ênio (footballer, born 1985) =

Brazilian footballer

Personal information
- Full name: Ênio Santos de Oliveira
- Date of birth: March 11, 1985 (age 41)
- Place of birth: Araguaína, Brazil
- Height: 1.90 m (6 ft 3 in)
- Position: Central defender

Team information
- Current team: Brasiliense

Youth career
- 2002–2007: Cruzeiro

Senior career*
Years	Team	Apps	(Gls)
2006	→ América Mineiro (loan)		
2007–2009	Cruzeiro		
2007–2008	→ Cabofriense (loan)		
2008–2009	→ Boavista-RJ (loan)		
2010	Remo		
2010	Linense		
2011	Comercial-SP		
2011–2012	Joinville		
2012–	Brasiliense		
- * Club domestic league appearances and goals

Ênio Santos de Oliveira or simply Ênio (born 11 March 1985) is a Brazilian central defender.

A native of Araguaína in the central Brazilian state of Goiás (formed into Tocantins in 1988), he has been playing for Cabofriense since 5 December 2007, while on loan from Cruzeiro.
