= Eduardo Siqueira Campos =

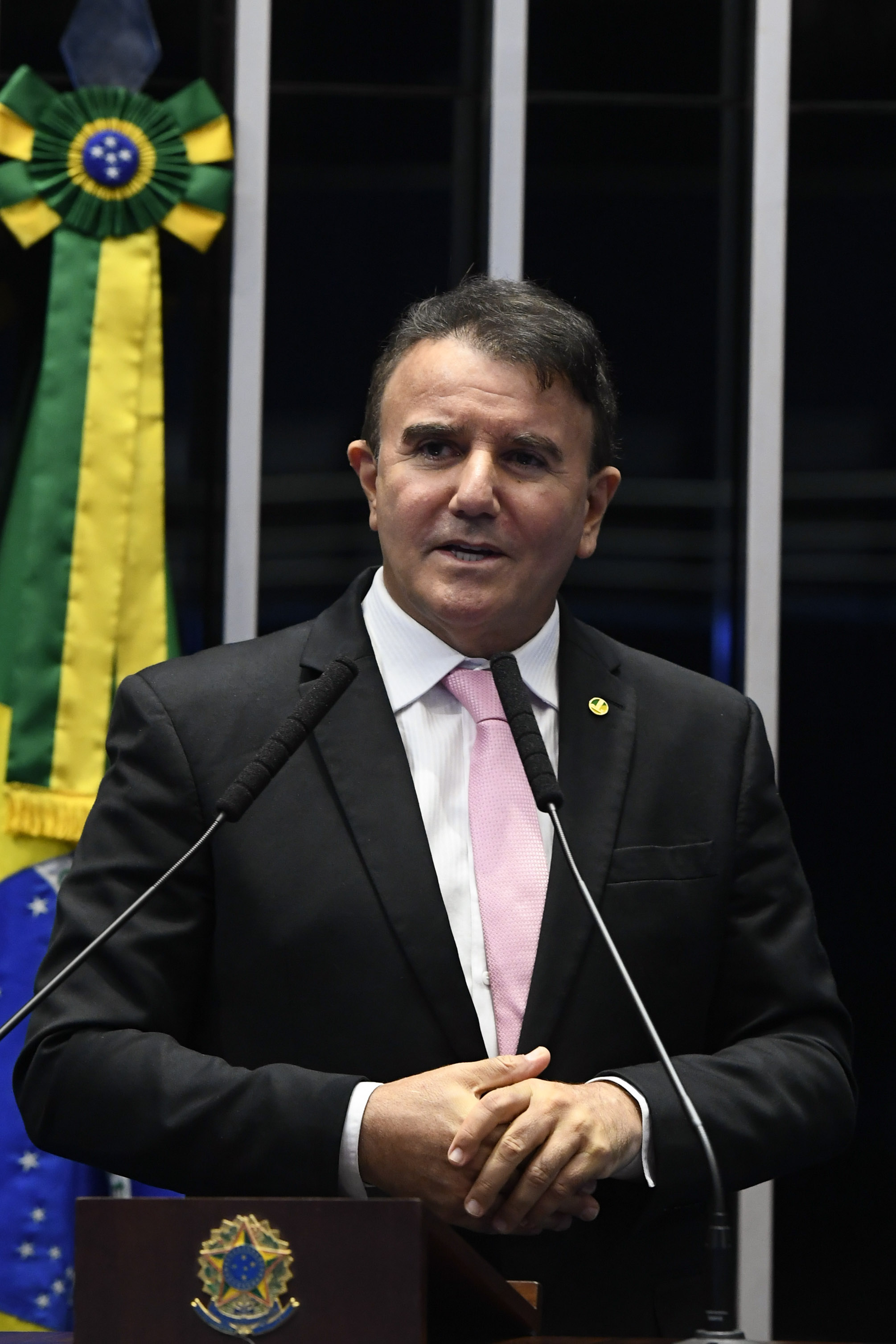
Jose Eduardo Siqueira Campos

José Eduardo Siqueira Campos (born March 4, 1959, in Campinas) is a Brazilian businessman, teacher and politician belonging to the Podemos (PODE) party.

During his career, he represented the state of Tocantins as a senator, federal deputy, and state deputy.

He is currently the mayor of Palmas, the capital of Tocantins, a position he previously held from 1993 to 1997.
