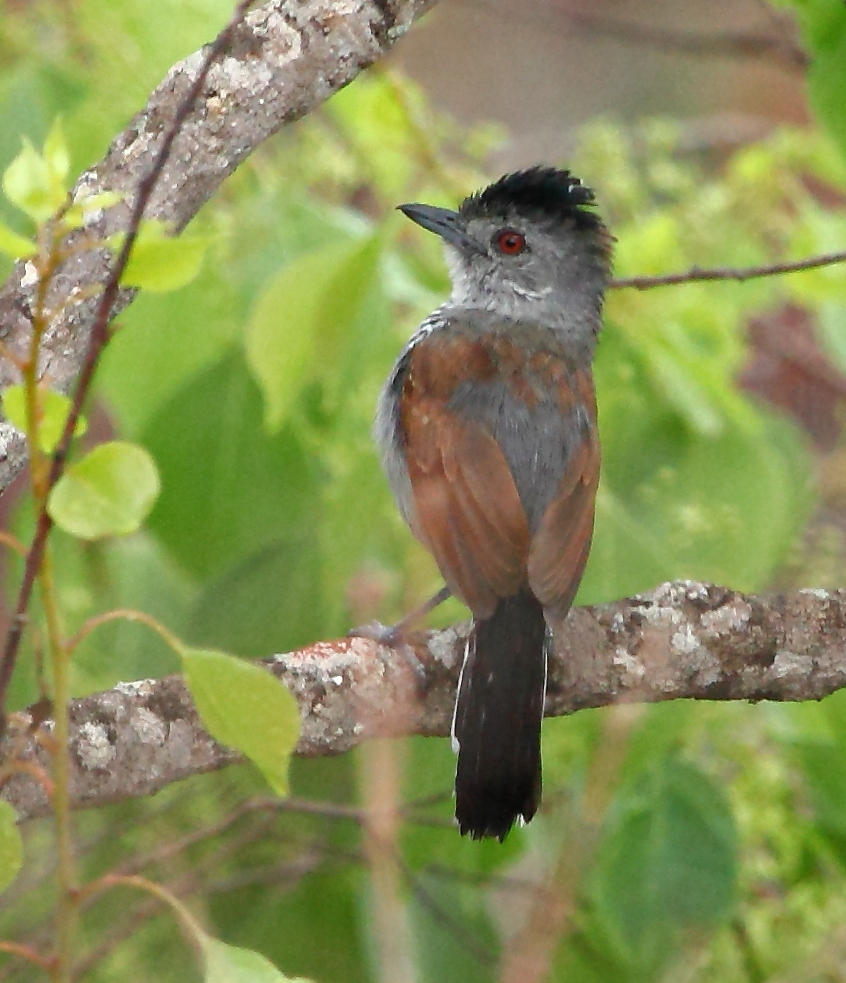
- Male
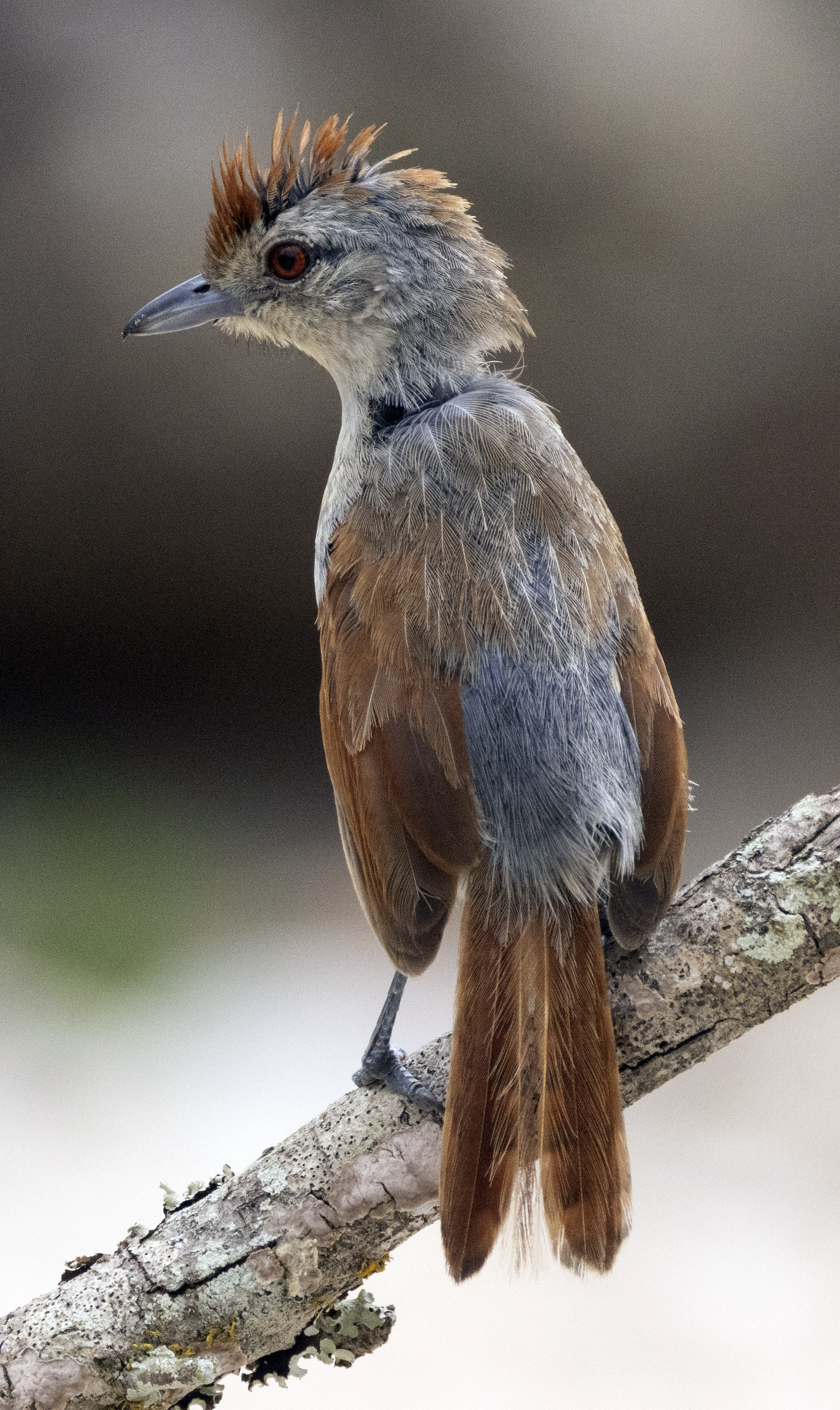
- Female

Conservation status
- Least Concern (IUCN 3.1)

Scientific classification
- Kingdom: Animalia
- Phylum: Chordata
- Class: Aves
- Order: Passeriformes
- Family: Thamnophilidae
- Genus: Thamnophilus
- Species: T. torquatus

Binomial name
- Thamnophilus torquatus Swainson, 1825

= Rufous-winged antshrike =

Species of bird

The rufous-winged antshrike (Thamnophilus torquatus) is a species of bird in subfamily Thamnophilinae of family Thamnophilidae, the "typical antbirds". It is found in Bolivia, Brazil, and Paraguay.

== Taxonomy and systematics ==
The rufous-winged antshrike was described by the English naturalist William Swainson in 1825 and given its current binomial name Thamnophilus torquatus. It and the rufous-capped antshrike (T. ruficapillus) are sister species. The South American Classification Committee of the American Ornithological Society is considering a proposal to lump them as a single species.

The rufous-winged antshrike is monotypic.

== Description ==
The rufous-winged antshrike is about 14 cm (5.5 in) long and weighs 18 to 20 g (0.63 to 0.71 oz). Members of genus Thamnophilus are largish members of the antbird family; all have stout bills with a hook like those of true shrikes. This species exhibits significant sexual dimorphism. Adult males have a black crown and a gray face, neck, and upperparts. Their wings and wing coverts are cinnamon-rufous. Their tail is black with white bars on the outer feathers. Their throat and underparts are whitish with black bars on the breast. Adult females have a rufous crown and a mottled whitish and gray face. Their upperparts are pale cinnamon-rufous. Their wings are like the male's. Their tail is rufous. Their underparts are buffy that is darker on the breast, flanks, and crissum; sometimes the breast has faint dusky bars.

== Distribution and habitat ==
The rufous-winged antshrike is found in Brazil from southern Pará east to Pernambuco and south to Rio de Janeiro state in the east. In the west its range continues southwest through Mato Grosso and Mato Grosso do Sul into eastern Bolivia's Santa Cruz Department and eastern Paraguay's Canindeyú Department. It inhabits the understorey of cerrado and nearby semi-deciduous woodlands. It also inhabits brushy gallery forest and second growth such as overgrown pastures and plantations. In elevation it mostly occurs below 1,000 m (3,300 ft) but ranges as high as 1,750 m (5,700 ft).

== Behavior ==
=== Movement ===
The rufous-winged antshrike is presumed to be a year-round resident throughout its range.

=== Feeding ===
The rufous-winged antshrike's diet has not been detailed but is mostly insects and other arthropods. It usually forages singly and in pairs, mostly in the understorey within 2 m (7 ft) of the ground though sometimes up to the canopy. It hops through vegetation, gleaning prey from leaves, stems, vines, and branches by reaching and sometimes making short upward sallies from a perch. It has been observed dropping to the ground to pick prey from the surface of leaf litter.It sometimes joins mixed-species feeding flocks.

=== Breeding ===
Rufous-winged antshrike nests have been found between April and June. Both sexes build the nest, a cup woven mostly of grass, rootlets, and fungal fibers with sometimes moss, bark, and human fibers such as twine included. Nests are suspended in a branch fork, usually between 0.7 and 1.5 m (2 and 5 ft) above the ground. The clutch size is usually two eggs though there is one record of three. Both parents incubate the clutch and provision nestlings. The incubation period is about 15 days and fledging occurs about 10 days after hatch.

=== Vocalization ===
The rufous-winged antshrike's song is " a moderately long...accelerating series of nasal notes, first one long and drawn out, followed by increasingly shorter notes, ending in longer downslurred note". Its calls include a "querulous upslurred whistle", a "nasal note that becomes harsh", and a "growl".

== Status ==
The IUCN has assessed the rufous-winged antshrike as being of Least Concern. It has a very large range; its population size is not known and is believed to be decreasing. No immediate threats have been identified. It is considered generally uncommon to fairly common but may be only local in some areas. It occurs in several large protected areas and "appears capable of adapting to second-growth habitats, thus rendering it less sensitive to disturbance".
