= Araguaína =

Municipality in Tocantins, Brazil

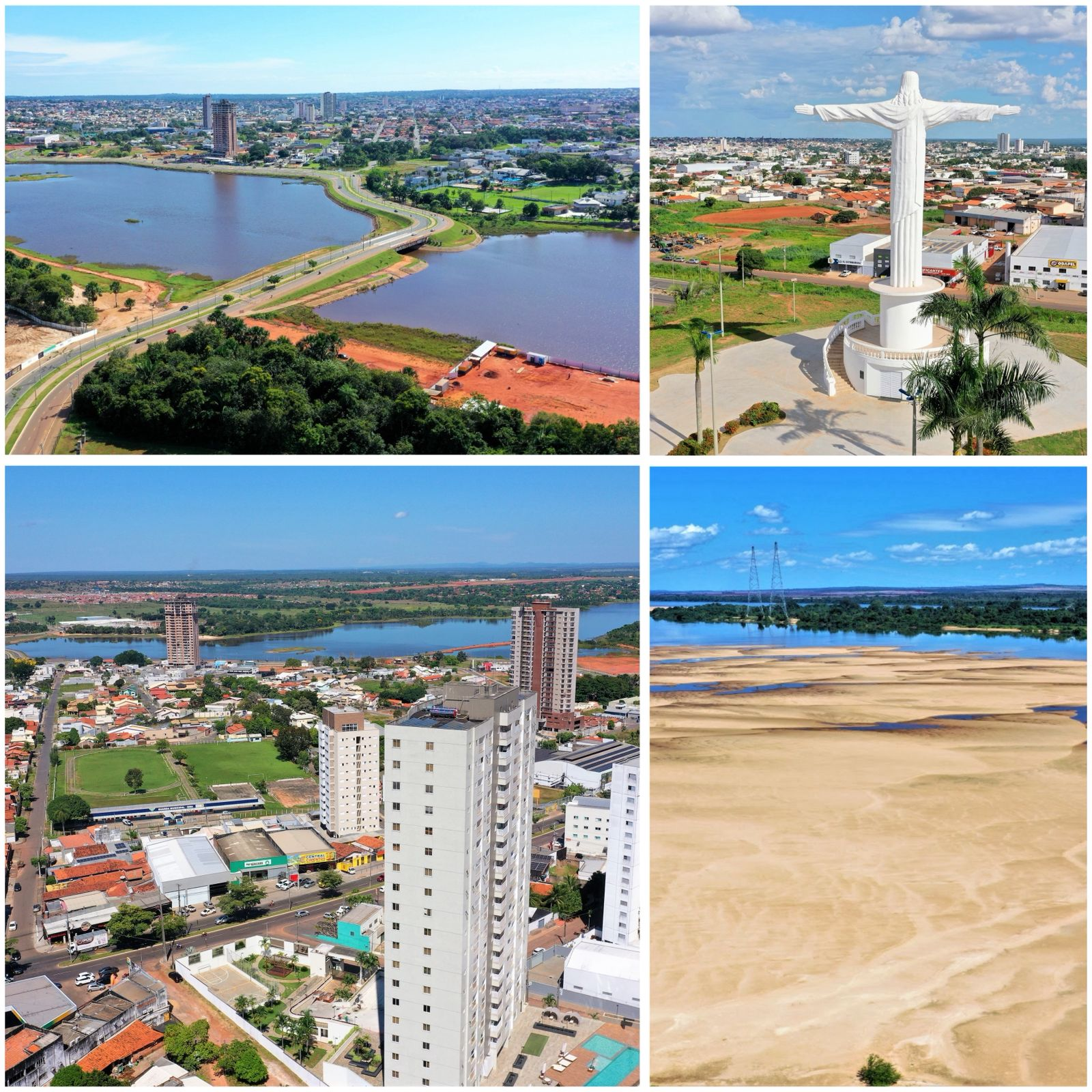
- Partial view from Araguaína with BR-153.

- Flag Coat of arms

- Location of Araguaína in the state of Tocantins

- Location of Araguaína in Brazil
- Coordinates: 07°11′27″S 48°12′25″W
- Country: Brazil
- Region: Norte
- State: Tocantins
- Founded: 14 November 1958

Area
  - Total: 3,920.1 km^{2} (1,513.6 sq mi)
- Elevation: 227 m (745 ft)

Population (2022 Brazilian Census)
  - Total: 171,301
  - Estimate (2025): 183,024
  - Density: 38.33/km^{2} (99.3/sq mi)
- Demonym: Araguainese
- Time zone: UTC−3 (BRT)
- Postal code: 77801 to 77901
- Area code: (+55) 63
- Website: http://www.araguaina.to.gov.br/

Araguaína (Brazilian Portuguese: [aɾaɡwaˈinɐ]) is a municipality located in the Brazilian state of Tocantins. Its population was 171,301 (2022 Census), and its area is 4,000.40 square kilometres (1,544.56 sq mi). Araguaína joined the UNESCO Global Network of Learning Cities in 2025.

== Education ==
=== Higher education ===
The city has campuses from several higher education institutions.

There are two campuses of the public Federal University of Tocantins State (UFT). One campus is in the neighborhood Cimba, which has courses in Portuguese, English, Mathematics, physics, chemistry, geography, history, logistics, cooperativism, and tourism with the other campus situated outside the city, offering courses in veterinary sciences and zoology.

The city is home to the private university ITPAC, an educational institute offering medical, dentistry, and law classes.

Another private university is Santa Cruz, which has courses in law.

The private university Facit has courses in ortodontology, and software development.

== Transport ==
Public transport in the city is done by the bus companies Cooperlota and Lontra.

The city is served by Araguaína Airport.

== Climate ==
Araguaína experiences a tropical savanna climate (Köppen: Aw) with hot temperatures and distinct wet and dry seasons.

The city experiences a wet season from November to April. The dry season extends from June to September.

Araguaína has hot and humid conditions throughout the year. September and October, before the wet season, are the hottest months, with average highs around 35 °C (95 °F).

Climate data for Araguaína (1991–2020)
Month	Jan	Feb	Mar	Apr	May	Jun	Jul	Aug	Sep	Oct	Nov	Dec	Year
Mean daily maximum °C (°F)	30.8 (87.4)	31.0 (87.8)	31.0 (87.8)	31.5 (88.7)	32.2 (90.0)	33.0 (91.4)	33.8 (92.8)	35.1 (95.2)	34.8 (94.6)	32.9 (91.2)	31.6 (88.9)	31.1 (88.0)	32.4 (90.3)
Daily mean °C (°F)	25.2 (77.4)	25.2 (77.4)	25.3 (77.5)	25.5 (77.9)	25.5 (77.9)	24.7 (76.5)	24.4 (75.9)	25.4 (77.7)	26.4 (79.5)	26.1 (79.0)	25.7 (78.3)	25.4 (77.7)	25.4 (77.7)
Mean daily minimum °C (°F)	21.6 (70.9)	21.7 (71.1)	22.0 (71.6)	21.8 (71.2)	21.0 (69.8)	18.5 (65.3)	17.1 (62.8)	17.5 (63.5)	19.7 (67.5)	21.0 (69.8)	21.6 (70.9)	21.7 (71.1)	20.4 (68.7)
Average precipitation mm (inches)	259.1 (10.20)	272.7 (10.74)	293.6 (11.56)	211.2 (8.31)	94.6 (3.72)	21.6 (0.85)	8.4 (0.33)	11.1 (0.44)	51.6 (2.03)	120.3 (4.74)	206.0 (8.11)	211.7 (8.33)	1,761.9 (69.37)
Average precipitation days (≥ 1.0 mm)	17.2	18.2	18.8	15.2	8.1	1.9	0.8	1.3	4.0	9.0	12.5	14.5	121.5
Average relative humidity (%)	85.6	85.9	86.8	85.5	80.8	71.9	63.8	57.8	63.8	76.1	82.7	84.6	77.1
Average dew point °C (°F)	23.0 (73.4)	23.0 (73.4)	23.3 (73.9)	23.4 (74.1)	22.7 (72.9)	20.4 (68.7)	18.4 (65.1)	17.9 (64.2)	19.9 (67.8)	22.2 (72.0)	23.0 (73.4)	23.1 (73.6)	21.7 (71.1)
Mean monthly sunshine hours	124.6	111.8	114.6	143.9	202.7	250.8	281.0	284.3	214.1	154.1	123.3	119.3	2,124.5
Source: NOAA

== Notable people ==
- Ênio – Brazilian footballer

== See also ==
- List of municipalities in Tocantins
