= Francisco José Furtado =

Brazilian politician (1818–1870)

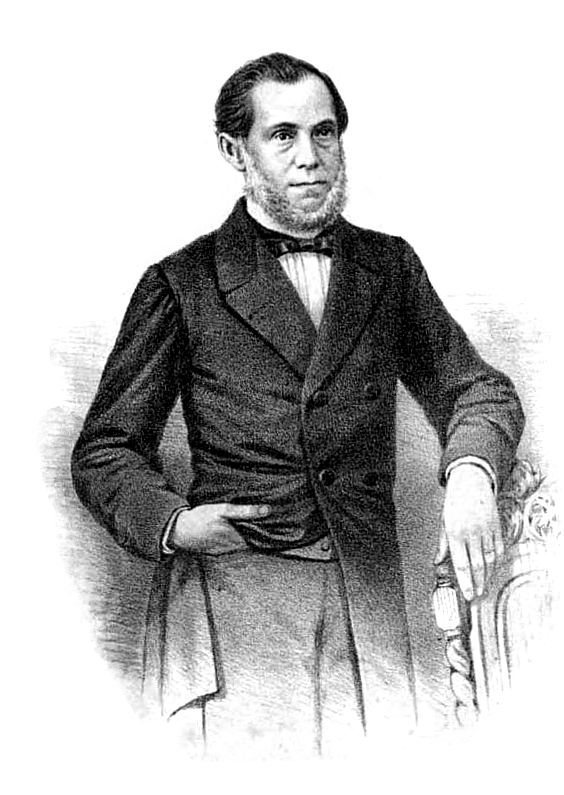

Prime Minister of Brazil
- In office 31 August 1864 – 12 May 1865
- Monarch: Pedro II
- Preceded by: Zacarias de Góis
- Succeeded by: Marquis of Olinda

Personal details
- Born: 13 August 1818 Oeiras, Piauí, Kingdom of Brazil
- Died: 23 June 1870 (aged 51) Rio de Janeiro, Empire of Brazil
- Party: Liberal Party
- Occupation: Politician

Francisco José Furtado (13 August 1818 in Oeiras, Piauí – 23 June 1870, in Rio de Janeiro) was a Brazilian politician. He was prime minister of the Empire of Brazil, and a member of its senate.

== Biography ==
After graduating from the Academy of Law at Caxias and serving for some time as judge, he entered politics and rose to be leader of the liberals. In 1847 he was elected deputy and reelected several times. In 1856 he was elected president of the new province of Amazonas, remaining such until 1859, when he was made Minister of Justice. In 1864 he was elected to membership in the senate of Brazil, but held that position for a few months only, and in August 1864 was made Premier and Minister of State, in which position he did much toward the establishment of a good monetary system. During his term of office as Minister of State, the dispute with Uruguay was settled and war between Brazil and Paraguay was declared. In 1870 he was again a member of the senate and as such, being an opponent of slavery, exerted all his influence in behalf of legislation looking toward its final abolition.
