= Noar Linhas Aéreas =

Brazilian airline

Noar Linhas Aéreas S/A
IATA	ICAO	Call sign
–	NRA	NOAR
- Founded: 2009
- Commenced operations: 2010
- Ceased operations: 2011
- Operating bases: Recife
- Fleet size: 1 (+1 ordered)
- Parent company: NOAR Aviation
- Headquarters: Caruaru, Brazil
- Key people: Vicente Jorge Espíndola Rodrigues (President)
- Website: www.voenoar.com.br

Noar Linhas Aéreas S/A (Nordeste Aviação Regional Linhas Aéreas) was a Brazilian domestic airline with headquarters in Caruaru, Brazil. Regular scheduled services started on June 14, 2010.

== History ==
The company's main objective is to operate in the market of scheduled regional flights on the northeast region of Brazil, connecting its major centers. It was founded in 2009 and on May 14, 2010 the National Civil Aviation Agency (ANAC) granted the final authorization to start operations. Flights began on June 14, 2010.

On October 1, 2010, Noar started an operational agreement with Gol Airlines in which Noar acted as a feeder carrier for Gol at Recife. This agreement was suspended in September 2011.

Following operational complications after its July 13, 2011 accident, on September 20, 2011 Noar requested to ANAC the temporary suspension of its services.

On November 26, 2014 Noar lost its operational license.

== Destinations ==
Noar Linhas Aéreas operated scheduled services to the following destinations:

- Aracaju – Santa Maria Airport
- Caruaru – Caruaru Airport
- João Pessoa – Presidente Castro Pinto International Airport
- Maceió – Zumbi dos Palmares International Airport
- Mossoró – Gov. Dix-Sept Rosado Airport
- Natal – Augusto Severo International Airport
- Paulo Afonso – Paulo Afonso Airport
- Recife – Guararapes/Gilberto Freyre International Airport

== Fleet ==
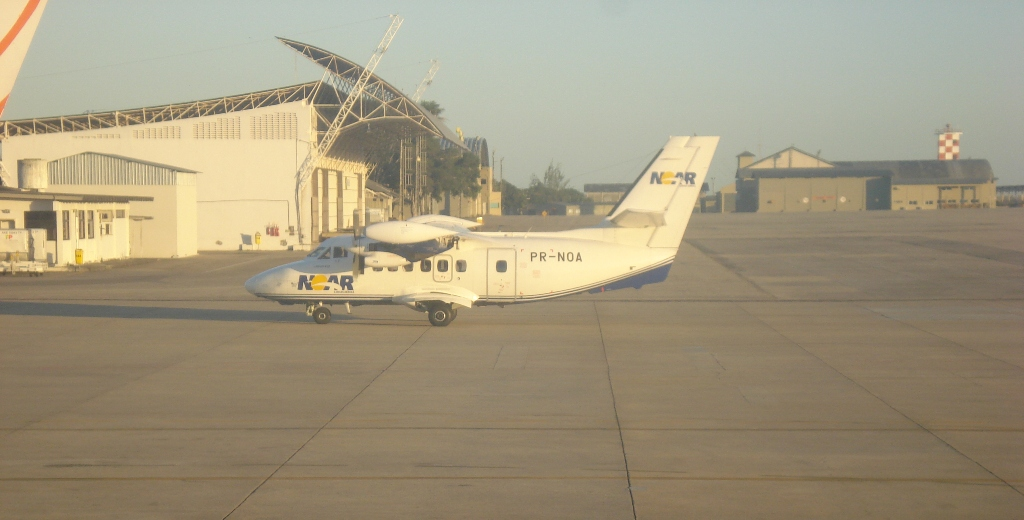
NOAR Let L-410 Turbolet.

As of December 2011, the fleet of Noar Linhas Aéreas included the following aircraft:

NOAR Linhas Aéreas fleet
Aircraft	Total	Orders	Passengers (Y)	Introduced	Notes
Let L-410 Turbolet	1	1	19	2010	

== Accidents and incidents ==
- 13 July 2011: a Let L-410 Turbolet registration PR-NOB operating flight 4896 from Recife to Natal and Mossoró crashed shortly after take-off from Recife. All 16 occupants were killed.

== See also ==
- List of defunct airlines of Brazil
