= List of most watched Brazil television broadcasts of 2020 =

The following is a list of most watched Brazil television broadcasts of 2020.

== Most watched by week ==
Week of	Show	Content	Network	Painel Nacional da Televisão (PNT) (Note: The "Painel Nacional da Televisão" represents data sample from 15 capitals + metropolitan areas, the broadest collection of television audience data for Brazil.)			Ref.
Week of	Show	Content	Network	Household rating	Average viewers (in millions)	Total viewers (in millions)	Ref.
January 6	A Mother's Love	Telenovela	Globo	29.6	20.813	29.040	
January 13	A Life Worth Living	Telenovela	Globo	30.4	21.376	26.155	
January 20	A Life Worth Living	Telenovela	Globo	32.1	22.571	28.267	
January 27	A Mother's Love	Telenovela	Globo	29.2	20.532	29.884	
February 2	A Mother's Love	Telenovela	Globo	30.0	21.095	30.517	
February 10	A Mother's Love	Telenovela	Globo	30.2	21.235	30.095	
February 17	A Mother's Love	Telenovela	Globo	30.1	21.165	29.954	
February 24	A Mother's Love	Telenovela	Globo	29.9	21.024	30.798	
March 2	Jair Bolsonaro COVID-19 speech	Presidential speech	Various	44.3	31.150		
March 9	Jair Bolsonaro COVID-19 speech	Presidential speech	Various	47.1	33.119		
March 16	Jornal Nacional	News program	Globo	34.2	24.048	34.806	
March 23	Jair Bolsonaro COVID-19 speech	Presidential speech	Various	52.4	36.845		
March 30	Jair Bolsonaro COVID-19 speech	Presidential speech	Various	47.4	33.330		
April 6	Jair Bolsonaro COVID-19 speech	Presidential speech	Various	45.6	32.064		
April 13	Looks & Essence rerun	Telenovela	Globo	32.5	22.852	30.798	
April 20	Looks & Essence rerun	Telenovela	Globo	32.9	23.134	30.165	
April 27	Aruanas special presentation	Thriller drama	Globo	33.9	23.837		
May 4	Looks & Essence rerun	Telenovela	Globo	31.4	22.079	28.407	
May 11	Looks & Essence rerun	Telenovela	Globo	32.2	22.641	27.704	
May 18	Looks & Essence rerun	Telenovela	Globo	32.0	22.501	28.056	
May 25	Looks & Essence rerun	Telenovela	Globo	31.0	21.798	27.001	
June 1	Looks & Essence rerun	Telenovela	Globo	30.9	21.727	26.931	
June 8	Looks & Essence rerun	Telenovela	Globo	30.3	21.305	26.439	
June 15	Looks & Essence rerun	Telenovela	Globo	31.8	22.360	27.001	
June 22	Looks & Essence rerun	Telenovela	Globo	31.2	21.938	27.001	
June 29	Looks & Essence rerun	Telenovela	Globo	30.3	21.305	27.001	
July 6	Looks & Essence rerun	Telenovela	Globo	30.8	21.657	26.790	
July 13	Total Dreamer rerun	Telenovela	Globo	30.7	21.587	25.946	
July 20	Hebe: The Star of Brazil	Biographical film	Globo	32.1	22.571		
July 27	Looks & Essence rerun	Telenovela	Globo	31.9	22.431	28.478	
August 3	Looks & Essence rerun	Telenovela	Globo	32.0	22.501	29.181	
August 10	Looks & Essence rerun	Telenovela	Globo	31.4	22.079	28.689	
August 17	Looks & Essence rerun	Telenovela	Globo	31.4	22.079	28.196	
August 24	Looks & Essence rerun	Telenovela	Globo	32.0	22.501	28.759	
August 31	Amor e Sorte	Comedy	Globo	32.8	23.063		
September 7	Jair Bolsonaro Independence day speech	Presidential speech	Various	37.4	27.915		
September 14	Looks & Essence rerun	Telenovela	Globo	33.5	23.556	30.095	
September 21	Total Dreamer rerun	Telenovela	Globo	30.7	21.587	26.931	
September 28	Criança Esperança	Benefit performance	Globo	31.6	22.220		
October 5	Total Dreamer rerun	Telenovela	Globo	29.8	20.954	26.720	
October 12	Edge of Desire rerun	Telenovela	Globo	26.4	18.563	25.735	
October 19	Edge of Desire rerun	Telenovela	Globo	27.0	18.985	27.775	
October 26	Edge of Desire rerun	Telenovela	Globo	26.7	18.774	27.564	
November 2	Edge of Desire rerun	Telenovela	Globo	26.8	18.844	28.126	
November 9	Edge of Desire rerun	Telenovela	Globo	27.1	19.055	28.126	
November 16	Edge of Desire rerun	Telenovela	Globo	27.2	19.126	28.618	
November 23	Luís Roberto Barroso Municipal elections speech	Superior Electoral Court speech	Various	27.9	19.618		
November 30	Edge of Desire rerun	Telenovela	Globo	26.9	18.915	27.845	

== See also ==
- Television in Brazil
- List of most watched Brazil television broadcasts of 2019
