= Fernando de Noronha Airport =

Governador Carlos Wilson Airport Aeroporto Governador Carlos Wilson
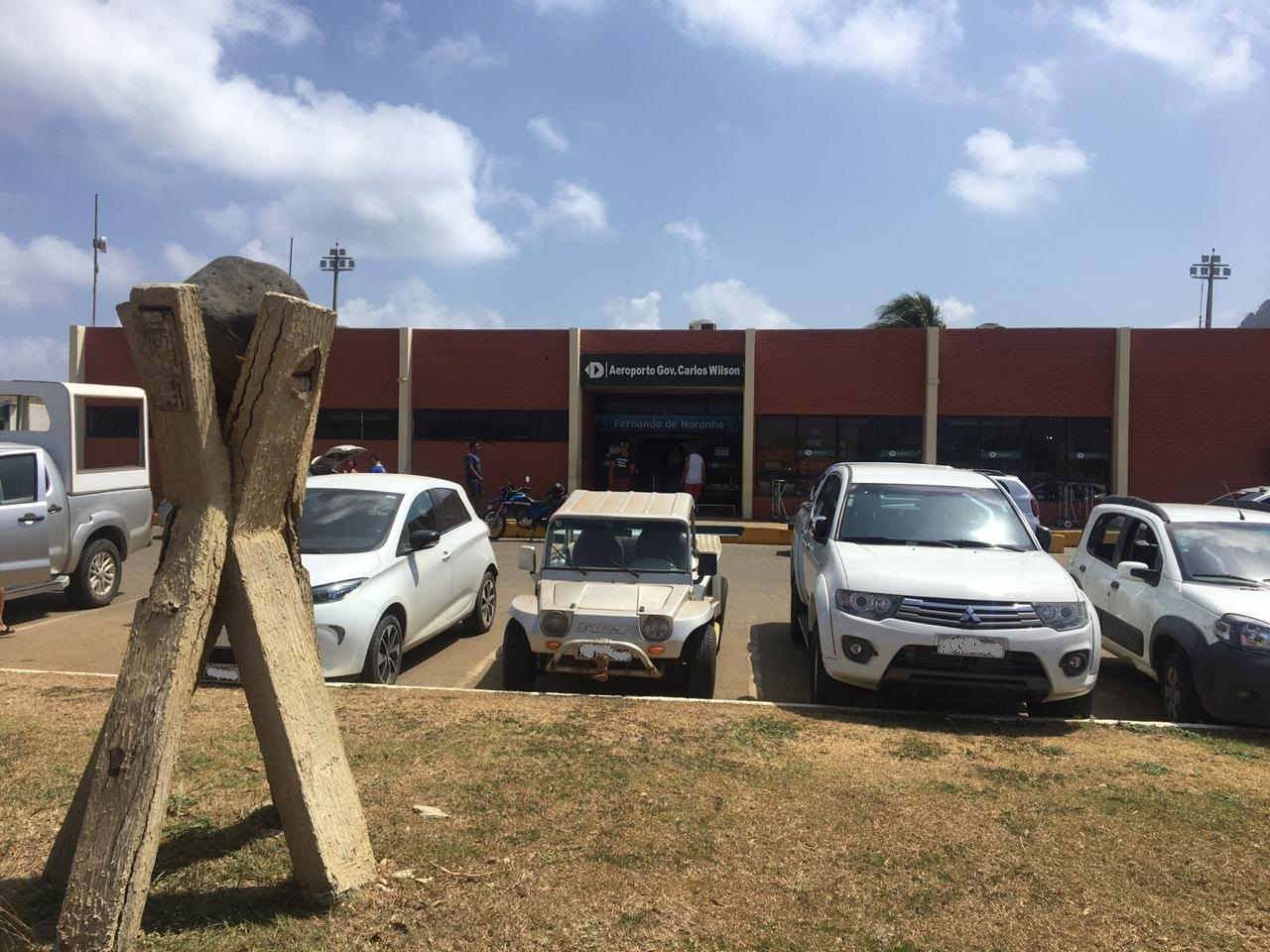
- IATA: FEN; ICAO: SBFN; LID: PE0003

Summary
- Airport type: Public
- Operator: Dix Empreendimentos
- Serves: Fernando de Noronha
- Time zone: BRT+1 (UTC−02:00)
- Elevation AMSL: 56 m (184 ft)
- Coordinates: 03°51′17″S 032°25′42″W
- Website: agemar.com.br/servicos/terminais-aeroportuarios

Map
- Location off the Atlantic coast of Brazil

Runways
Direction	Length		Surface
Direction	m	ft	Surface
12/30	1,845	6,053	Asphalt
- Sources: ANAC, DECEA

Gov. Carlos Wilson Airport (IATA: FEN, ICAO: SBFN) is the airport serving the island of Fernando de Noronha, Brazil. It is the easternmost airport of Brazil and the only facility located in the Brazilian oceanic islands.

It is operated by Dix Empreendimentos.

== History ==
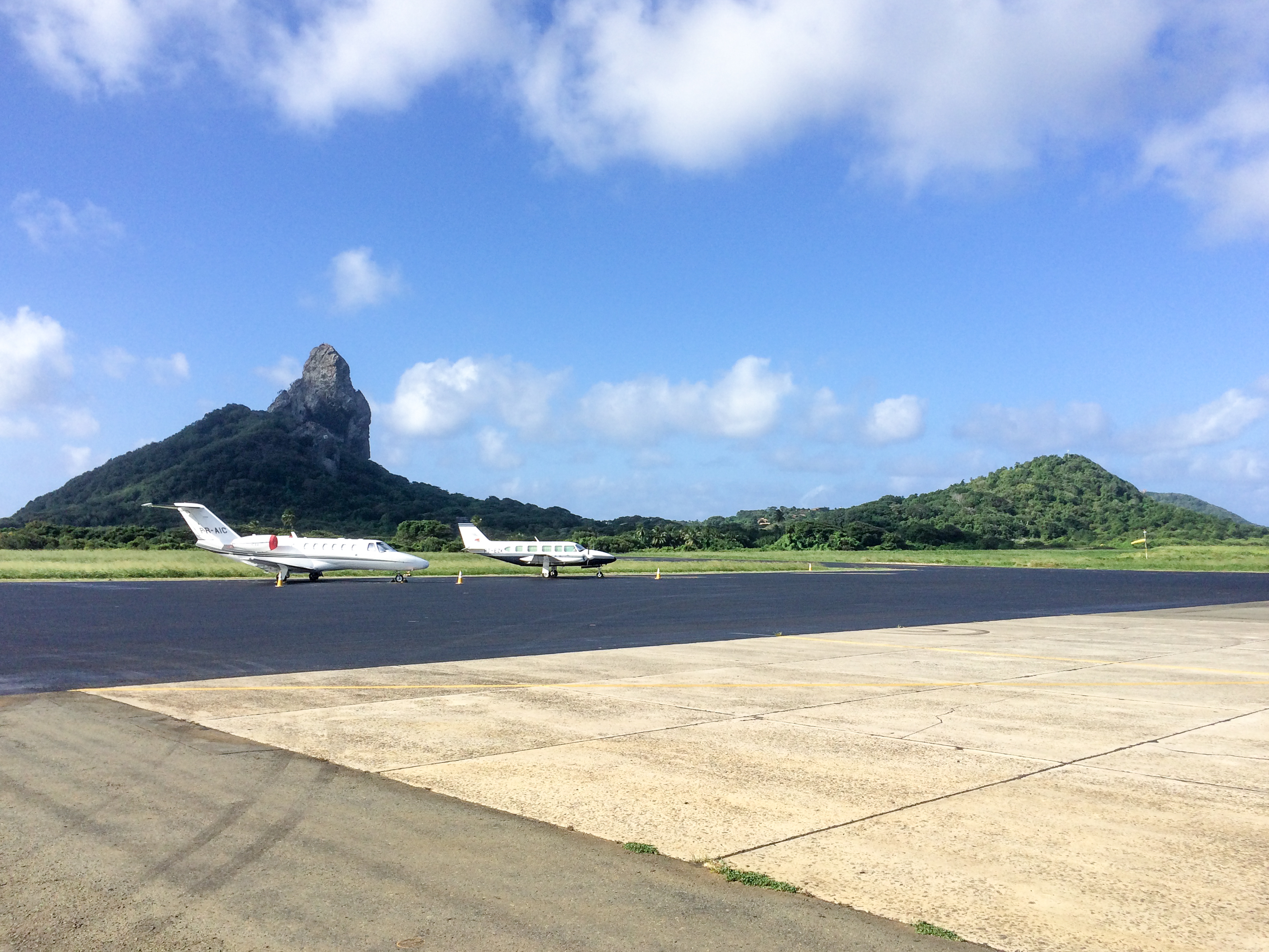
Apron

Fernando de Noronha is the biggest island of the archipelago with the same name, located in Brazilian territorial waters, 545 km (339 mi; 294 nmi) away from Recife and 360 km (220 mi; 190 nmi) away from Natal.

The first runway was built in 1934. In 1942, during World War II, the runway was extended and a passenger terminal was built by the United States Army Air Forces Air Transport Command under the Airport Development Program. It provided technical support for the Natal-Dakar air route, which provided a transoceanic link between Brazil and French West Africa for cargo, transiting aircraft and personnel.

The airport was transferred to the jurisdiction of the United States Navy on 5 September 1944. After the end of the war, the administration of the airport was transferred back to the Brazilian Government.

In 1975 another extension of the runway was made, allowing the operations of aircraft up to the class of a Boeing 737. In March 1999, the present passenger terminal was opened for service.

Following the crash of Air France Flight 447 on June 1, 2009, the airport became a base for search and rescue operations. The flight was en route from Rio de Janeiro-Galeão to Paris-Charles de Gaulle when it disappeared in the Atlantic Ocean approximately 550 km (340 mi; 300 nmi) northeast of Fernando de Noronha. Floating debris and bodies were recovered within five days (the flight recorders however, would not be recovered until 2011), and it was determined that the aircraft had crashed into the Atlantic Ocean killing all 228 people on board.

Starting October 12, 2022, the operation of jet engine aircraft at the airport was indefinitely but temporarily suspended by the National Civil Aviation Agency of Brazil. Operations of turboprop aircraft were not affected. The reason for the decision was the condition of the runway which is in need of repairs. The problem had already been reported to the operator in 2019 but repairs were not satisfactory. Following this decision, Gol Linhas Aéreas for lack of authorized aircraft had to temporarily suspend its flights to the island, and Azul Brazilian Airlines switched the operation of its flights to ATR 72-600 aircraft in lieu of Embraer 195 and Embraer 195-E2 aircraft.

== Airlines and destinations ==
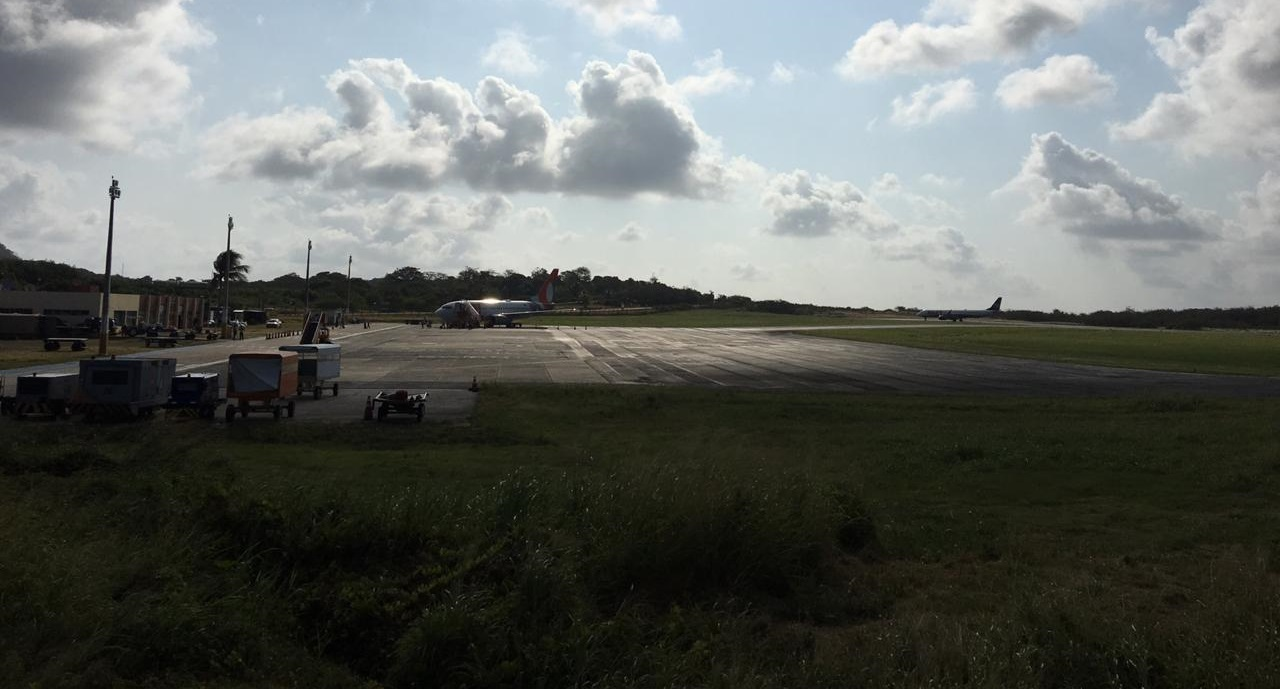
Apron with terminal airside

Airlines	Destinations
Azul Brazilian Airlines	Recife
Gol Linhas Aéreas	Recife, São Paulo–Guarulhos
LATAM Brasil	São Paulo–Guarulhos

== Accidents and incidents ==
- 14 December 1987: a Brazilian Air Force Lockheed C-130H Hercules registration FAB-2468 flying from Recife to Fernando de Noronha crashed into the sea shortly before landing. All 29 crew and passengers died.
- 20 September 1990: an Embraer EMB110P1 Bandeirante registration PT-PAW belonging to the Government of Pernambuco flying from Fernando de Noronha to Recife crashed into the sea shortly after take-off. All 12 crew and passengers died.

== Access ==
The airport is located 4 km (2.5 mi) from Vila dos Remédios, the administrative center of the island.

== See also ==
- List of airports in Brazil
