= Noar Linhas Aéreas Flight 4896 =

2011 aviation accident

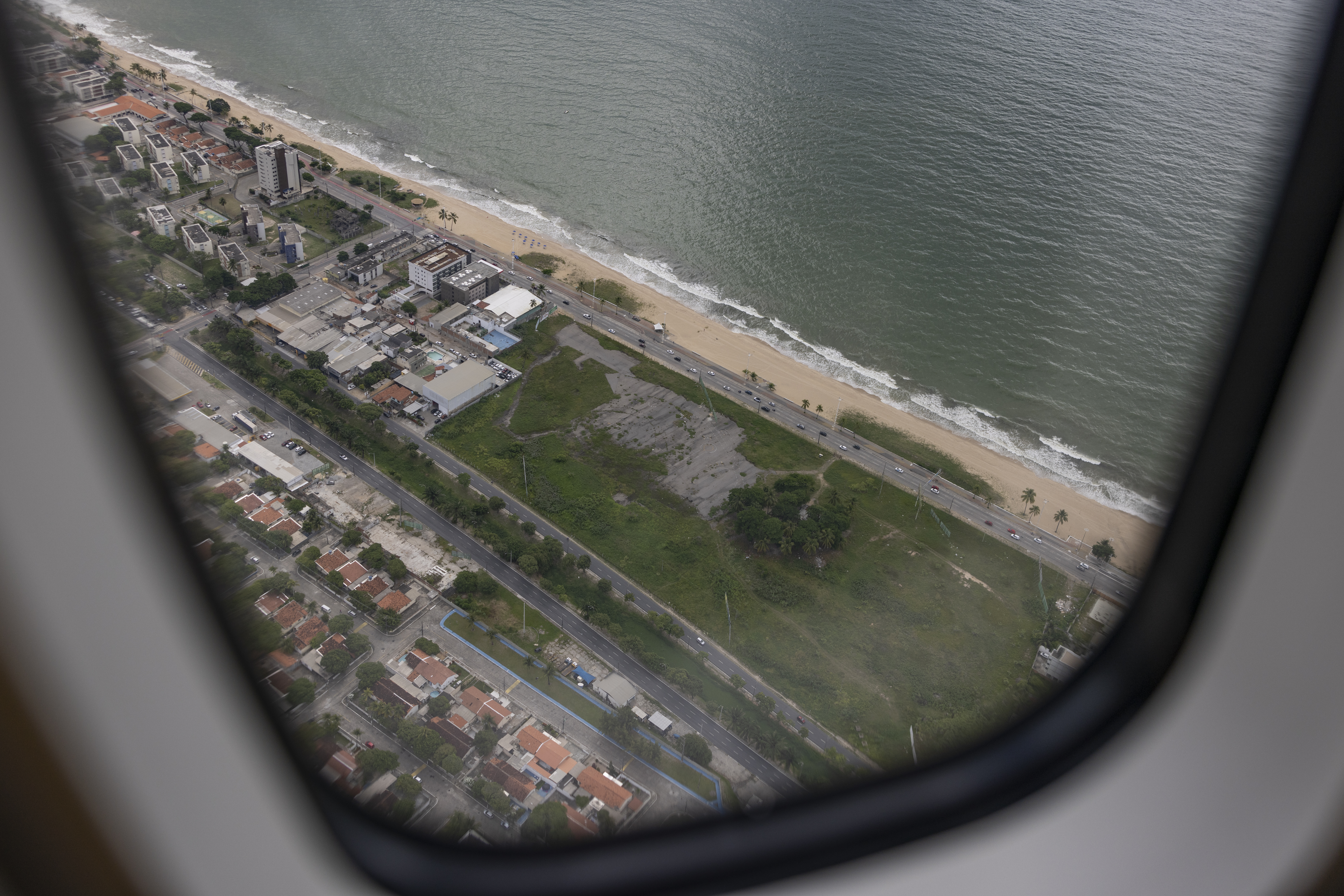
- The crash site, pictured in 2022

Accident
- Date: 13 July 2011
- Summary: Crashed following engine failure at take-off
- Site: Recife, Brazil; 8°09′09″S 34°54′34″W

Aircraft
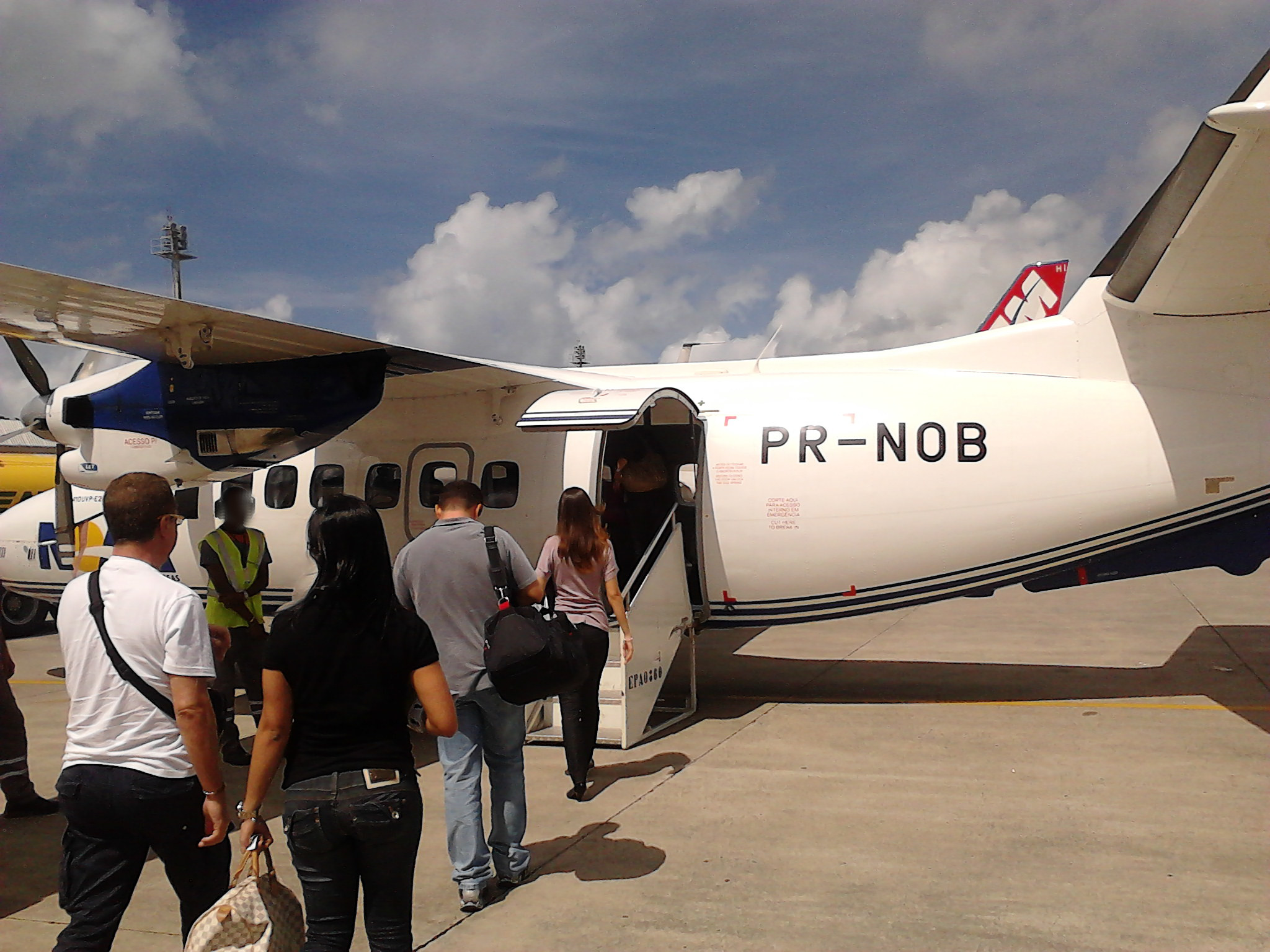
- PR-NOB, the aircraft involved in the accident, pictured in June 2011
- Aircraft type: Let L-410UVP-E20
- Operator: Noar Linhas Aéreas
- Call sign: NOAR 4896
- Registration: PR-NOB
- Flight origin: Recife Airport, Recife, Brazil
- Stopover: Augusto Severo International Airport, Natal, Brazil
- Destination: Mossoró Airport, Mossoró, Brazil
- Occupants: 16
- Passengers: 14
- Crew: 2
- Fatalities: 16
- Survivors: 0

On 13 July 2011, Noar Linhas Aéreas Flight 4896, a Let L-410 Turbolet passenger aircraft on a domestic service from Recife to Mossoró, Brazil, crashed shortly after take-off in the Boa Viagem neighbourhood of Recife, after suffering an engine failure. All 16 people on board were killed.

== Aircraft ==
The accident aircraft was Let L-410UVP-E20 with registration PR-NOB, built in 2010 as c/n 2722. It was the second purchased by Noar Linhas Aéreas, entering service in June 2010.

The L-410 is powered by two M601 turboprop engines produced by Czech manufacturer Walter. The M601 is a free-turbine turboshaft, where the propeller is driven by a power turbine that is unconnected to the gas generator turbine (sometimes called compressor turbine).

== Accident ==
The aircraft took off from Recife Airport's runway 18 at 06:50 local time (09:50 UTC) bound for Augusto Severo International Airport, Natal and then Mossoró Airport, its final destination. Seconds after lift-off, the left engine lost power, and a minute later the crew issued a mayday call, requesting to return immediately to the airport.

The Turbolet climbed to 400 ft while turning to position itself for a landing on the opposite runway 36, but it subsequently started losing altitude. At 06:54, shortly after the crew announced their intention to attempt an emergency landing on the beach, the aircraft stalled and crashed into an open area of Boa Viagem, between Visconde de Jequitinhonha and Boa Viagem Avenue, approximately 2 km (1.2 mi; 1.1 nmi) from the end of the runway. An intense post-impact fire erupted, consuming most of the wreckage. Both pilots and all fourteen passengers were killed.

== Investigation ==
An investigation into the accident was opened by the Aeronautical Accidents Investigation and Prevention Center (Portuguese: Centro de Investigação e Prevenção de Acidentes Aeronáuticos – CENIPA).

In July 2013, the CENIPA published its final report. It found that the left engine failed because a blade in the gas generator turbine had broken off shortly after the airplane lifted off the runway, causing extensive damage to the engine and loss of power. The failure was caused by metal fatigue originating underneath the surface of the blade. A fluorescent penetrant inspection carried out during maintenance six months before the accident had not revealed any abnormality.

While twin-engine aircraft are normally capable of flying with one engine inoperative, the report identified several factors that prevented the Turbolet from maintaining altitude and speed, including a 130 kg (290 lb) exceedance in the maximum take-off weight resulting from an error in the software used by the flight dispatcher, the insufficient application of right rudder by the pilot flying, and the incomplete execution of the recommended emergency procedure for engine failure at take-off.

The report highlighted deficiencies in Noar's training programme for the L-410 aircraft with regard to engine failures at take-off, and also discrepancies between different versions of the aircraft checklists that were available to flight crews. The CENIPA made several safety recommendations to Noar and Let to address such issues, and also to GE Aviation, the owner of engine manufacturer Walter, to "reevaluate the method utilized for the exam of the blades."
