= List of most watched Brazil television broadcasts of 2019 =

The following is a list of most watched Brazil television broadcasts of 2019. Traditionally, telenovelas dominate the weekly ratings of Brazil's television seasons, and in 2019 was no different. Rede Globo maintains its hegemony and monopoly of the Brazilian public's preference every year. Only two different genres reached the top position in the weekly audience in addition to telenovelas: news program and broadcast of association football matches. The 2019 Copa America game between Brazil and Argentina was the most watched television broadcast of the year in the country, with an estimated audience of 44 million viewers, being closely followed by the last week of "A Dona do Pedaço", which was watched by 42 million viewers.

In São Paulo, the largest city in Brazil, the highest rating of the year was from the last week of "A Dona do Pedaço": 43.2 points; while in Rio de Janeiro, the Copa Libertadores semifinal match between Flamengo and Grêmio registered a rating of 51 points.

== Most watched by week ==
Week of	Show	Content	Network	Painel Nacional da Televisão (PNT) (Note: The "Painel Nacional da Televisão" represents data sample from 15 capitals + metropolitan areas, the broadest collection of television audience data for Brazil.)			São Paulo		Rio de Janeiro	
Week of	Show	Content	Network	Household rating	Individual rating	Total viewers (in millions)	Rating	Total viewers (in millions)	Rating	Total viewers (in millions)
January 7	O Sétimo Guardião	Telenovela	Globo	26.8	12.6	27.324	26.5	8.569	29.3	5.354
January 14	O Sétimo Guardião	Telenovela	Globo	27.5	12.8	28.038	27.9	8.816	29.4	5.510
January 21	O Sétimo Guardião	Telenovela	Globo	28.2	13.3	28.751	29.1	9.033	29.8	5.667
January 28	Verão 90 special presentation	Telenovela	Globo	28.6	13.3	29.159	28.0	2.795	29.7	1.838
February 4	Globo News special report	News program	Globo	30.6	14.8	31.198	19.8	4.000	21.8	2.661
February 11	O Sétimo Guardião	Telenovela	Globo	28.4	13.4	28.955	29.7	9.062	29.8	5.772
February 18	O Sétimo Guardião	Telenovela	Globo	28.1	13.3	28.649	29.8	8.866	29.5	5.476
February 25	O Sétimo Guardião	Telenovela	Globo	27.8	13.2	28.343	29.3	8.891	29.7	5.739
March 4	O Sétimo Guardião	Telenovela	Globo	27.3	13.1	27.834	28.6	8.673	28.4	5.533
March 11	O Sétimo Guardião	Telenovela	Globo	28.9	13.7	29.465	30.0	8.965	31.4	5.671
March 18	O Sétimo Guardião	Telenovela	Globo	28.5	13.5	29.057	30.0	9.193	30.8	5.661
March 25	O Sétimo Guardião	Telenovela	Globo	28.3	13.4	28.853	30.1	9.023	30.2	5.699
April 1	O Sétimo Guardião	Telenovela	Globo	28.5	13.5	28.957	30.9	8.832	30.2	5.612
April 8	State football championships finals	Association football	Globo	33.3	15.9	33.951	36.6	5.812	34.6	3.605
April 15	State football championships finals	Association football	Globo	31.0	14.7	31.606	36.9	6.155	32.9	3.373
April 22	O Sétimo Guardião	Telenovela	Globo	27.9	13.3	28.445	29.9	8.552	28.6	5.373
April 29	O Sétimo Guardião	Telenovela	Globo	28.1	13.3	28.649	29.8	8.408	29.6	5.227
May 6	O Sétimo Guardião	Telenovela	Globo	28.6	13.6	29.159	30.3	8.747	30.8	5.332
May 13	O Sétimo Guardião	Telenovela	Globo	29.8	14.1	30.383	31.1	8.939	33.3	5.748
May 20	A Dona do Pedaço	Telenovela	Globo	29.7	14.3	30.281	31.6	9.199	32.1	5.777
May 27	A Dona do Pedaço	Telenovela	Globo	30.5	14.6	31.096	32.8	9.310	32.2	5.670
June 3	Brazil vs. Qatar friendly match	Association football	Globo	31.2	15.3	31.810	33.3	6.055	30.7	3.680
June 10	A Dona do Pedaço	Telenovela	Globo	29.2	13.9	29.771	31.6	9.467	31.4	5.615
June 17	Copa America — Brazil vs. Venezuela	Association football	Globo	33.7	16.5	34.359	33.8	6.221	33.0	3.946
June 24	Copa America — Brazil vs. Paraguay	Association football	Globo	36.4	18.0	37.112	36.3	6.600	35.2	3.966
July 1	Copa America — Brazil vs. Argentina	Association football	Globo	43.3	21.7	44.147	41.4	7.283	42.2	4.286
July 8	A Dona do Pedaço	Telenovela	Globo	31.0	14.9	31.606	33.5	9.296	32.7	5.576
July 15	A Dona do Pedaço	Telenovela	Globo	32.0	15.4	32.626	34.3	9.233	33.4	5.846
July 22	A Dona do Pedaço	Telenovela	Globo	32.1	15.5	32.728	34.4	9.609	34.5	5.910
July 29	A Dona do Pedaço	Telenovela	Globo	32.8	15.8	33.441	34.7	9.664	35.7	6.127
August 5	A Dona do Pedaço	Telenovela	Globo	34.1	16.4	34.767	36.5	10.083	36.6	6.159
August 12	A Dona do Pedaço	Telenovela	Globo	34.6	16.7	35.277	37.2	9.667	37.4	6.220
August 19	A Dona do Pedaço	Telenovela	Globo	37.9	18.5	38.641	39.4	10.011	41.6	6.665
August 26	A Dona do Pedaço	Telenovela	Globo	36.4	17.6	37.112	38.5	10.049	38.7	6.375
September 2	A Dona do Pedaço	Telenovela	Globo	39.0	19.0	39.763	41.3	5.184	43.9	3.346
September 9	A Dona do Pedaço	Telenovela	Globo	36.1	17.3	36.806	38.4	9.372	39.4	5.883
September 16	A Dona do Pedaço	Telenovela	Globo	35.4	17.1	36.092	37.8	9.381	37.9	5.900
September 23	A Dona do Pedaço	Telenovela	Globo	36.7	17.7	37.418	39.3	9.502	39.6	6.035
September 30	A Dona do Pedaço	Telenovela	Globo	35.8	17.3	36.500	38.3	9.401	37.9	5.928
October 7	A Dona do Pedaço	Telenovela	Globo	35.3	17.0	35.990	38.5	9.385	37.4	6.035
October 14	A Dona do Pedaço	Telenovela	Globo	36.3	17.6	37.010	38.7	9.441	38.4	5.807
October 21	Copa Libertadores — Flamengo vs. Grêmio	Association football	Globo	37.5	18.3	38.233	32.5	6.307	51.1	4.956
October 28	A Dona do Pedaço	Telenovela	Globo	39.0	19.0	39.763	41.1	9.941	40.1	6.070
November 4	A Dona do Pedaço	Telenovela	Globo	38.1	18.5	38.845	40.4	9.599	40.8	6.193
November 11	A Dona do Pedaço	Telenovela	Globo	38.0	18.5	38.743	39.7	9.821	41.4	6.358
November 18	A Dona do Pedaço	Telenovela	Globo	41.5	20.5	42.312	43.2	9.979	43.8	6.539
November 25	Amor de Mãe	Telenovela	Globo	29.8	14.4	30.383	31.5	8.931	34.3	5.934
December 2	Amor de Mãe	Telenovela	Globo	27.9	13.4	28.445	29.6	8.331	32.3	5.651
December 9	Bom Sucesso	Telenovela	Globo	27.7	13.2	28.242	28.8	7.858	29.4	5.217
December 16	Amor de Mãe	Telenovela	Globo	27.7	13.0	29.240	29.0	8.084	31.2	5.310
December 22	Bom Sucesso	Telenovela	Globo	24.9	12.0	25.387	25.2	7.436	27.2	5.342
December 29	Jornal Nacional	News program	Globo	27.9	13.5	28.442	28.7	2.701	33.9	2.014

== See also ==
- Television in Brazil
- List of most watched Brazil television broadcasts of 2020
