= Ari Magalhães =

Brazilian politician (1928–2021)

Ari Magalhães (11 October 1928 in Oeiras, Piauí – 15 June 2021 in São Paulo) was a Brazilian politician.

== Biography ==
From 1995 until 1999, he served as a member of the Chamber of Deputies, representing the Progressistas.

Magalhães died of respiratory complications from COVID-19 at the age of 81 in São Paulo.
