= Oeiras Municipality =

Oeiras Municipality may refer to:

- Oeiras Municipality, Brazil
- Oeiras Municipality, Portugal
