= Recife Air Force Base =

Air base of the Brazilian Air Force

- Base Aérea de Recife
- Recife, Pernambuco in Brazil
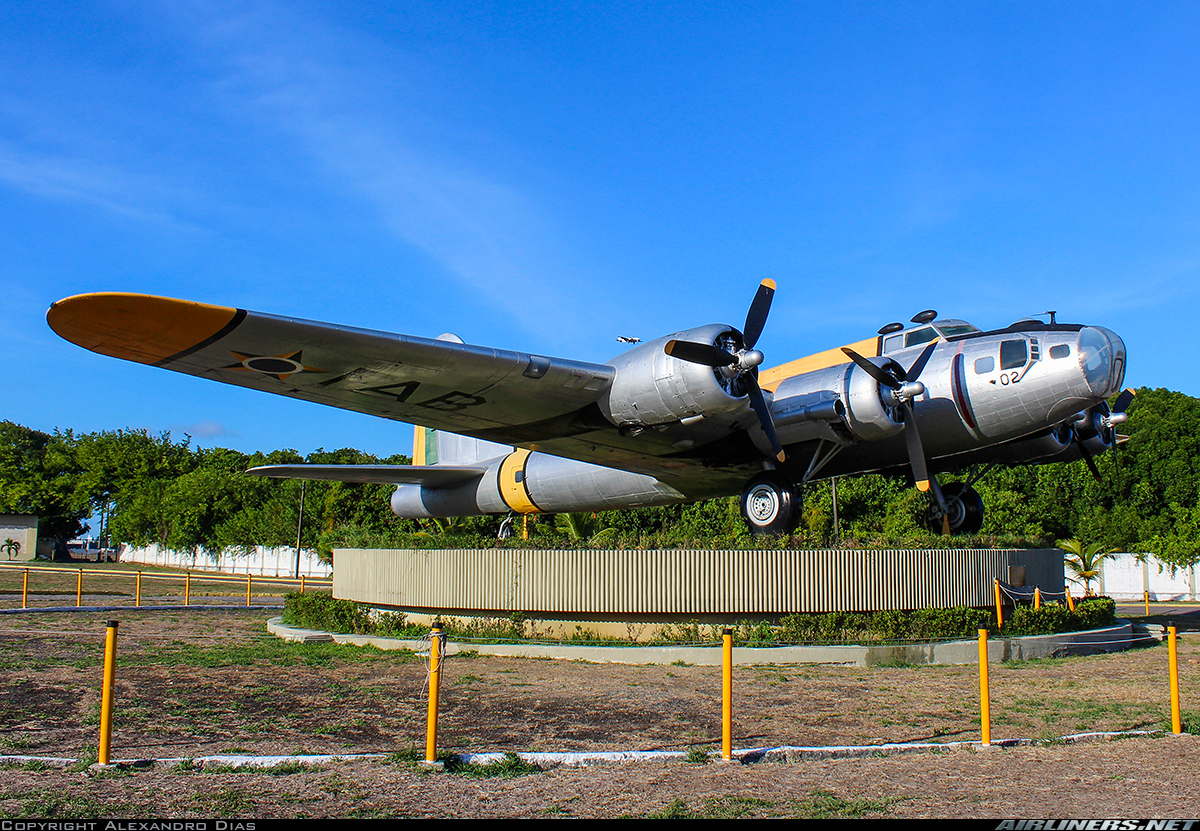
- A Boeing SB-17G Flying Fortress on display at Recife in 2020

Site information
- Type: Air Force Base
- Code: BARF
- Owner: Brazilian Air Force
- Controlled by: Brazilian Air Force
- Open to the public: No
- Website: www.fab.mil.br/organizacoes/mostra/46/BASE%20A%C3%89REA%20DE%20RECIFE

Location
- Location in Brazil
- Coordinates: 08°07′35″S 034°55′22″W

Site history
- In use: 1941-2024

Garrison information
- Current commander: Cel. Av. Isaac Cordeiro da Fonseca Neto

Airfield information
- Identifiers: IATA: REC, ICAO: SBRF, LID: PE0001
- Elevation: 10 metres (33 ft) AMSL
Runways
| Direction | Length and surface |
|---|---|
| 18/36 | 2,751 metres (9,026 ft) Asphalt |

Base Aérea do Recife – BARF (IATA: REC, ICAO: SBRF) was a base of the Brazilian Air Force, located in Recife, Brazil.

It shared some facilities with Recife/Guararapes–Gilberto Freyre International Airport.

== History ==
Recife Air Force Base was created on 24 July 1941 by Decree 3,459.

The Air Force Base was decommissioned on July 24, 2024.

== Units ==
Since January 2017, there were no permanent flying units assigned to Recife Air Force Base. Whenever needed, the aerodrome is used as a support facility to other air units of the Brazilian Air Force, Navy and Army.

=== Former units ===
May 1969–January 2018: 2nd Squadron of Air Transportation (2°ETA) Pastor. The squadron was moved to Natal Air Force Base.

== Access ==
The base was located 14 km from downtown Recife.

== Accidents and incidents ==
- 28 July 1968: a United States Air Force Douglas C-124C Globemaster II registration 51–5178, flying from Paramaribo-Zanderij to Recife, while on approach to land at Recife, flew into a 1890 feet high hill 80 km away from Recife. The 10 occupants died.
- 21 December 1969: a Brazilian Air Force Lockheed C-130E Hercules registration FAB-2450 crashed shortly after takeoff. All 7 occupants died.
- 23 October 1992: a Brazilian Air Force Embraer C-95 Bandeirante registration FAB-2243 crashed in the vicinity of the Base while operating on a low level display flight. All 5 occupants died.

== Gallery ==
This gallery displays aircraft that have been based at Fortaleza. The gallery is not comprehensive.

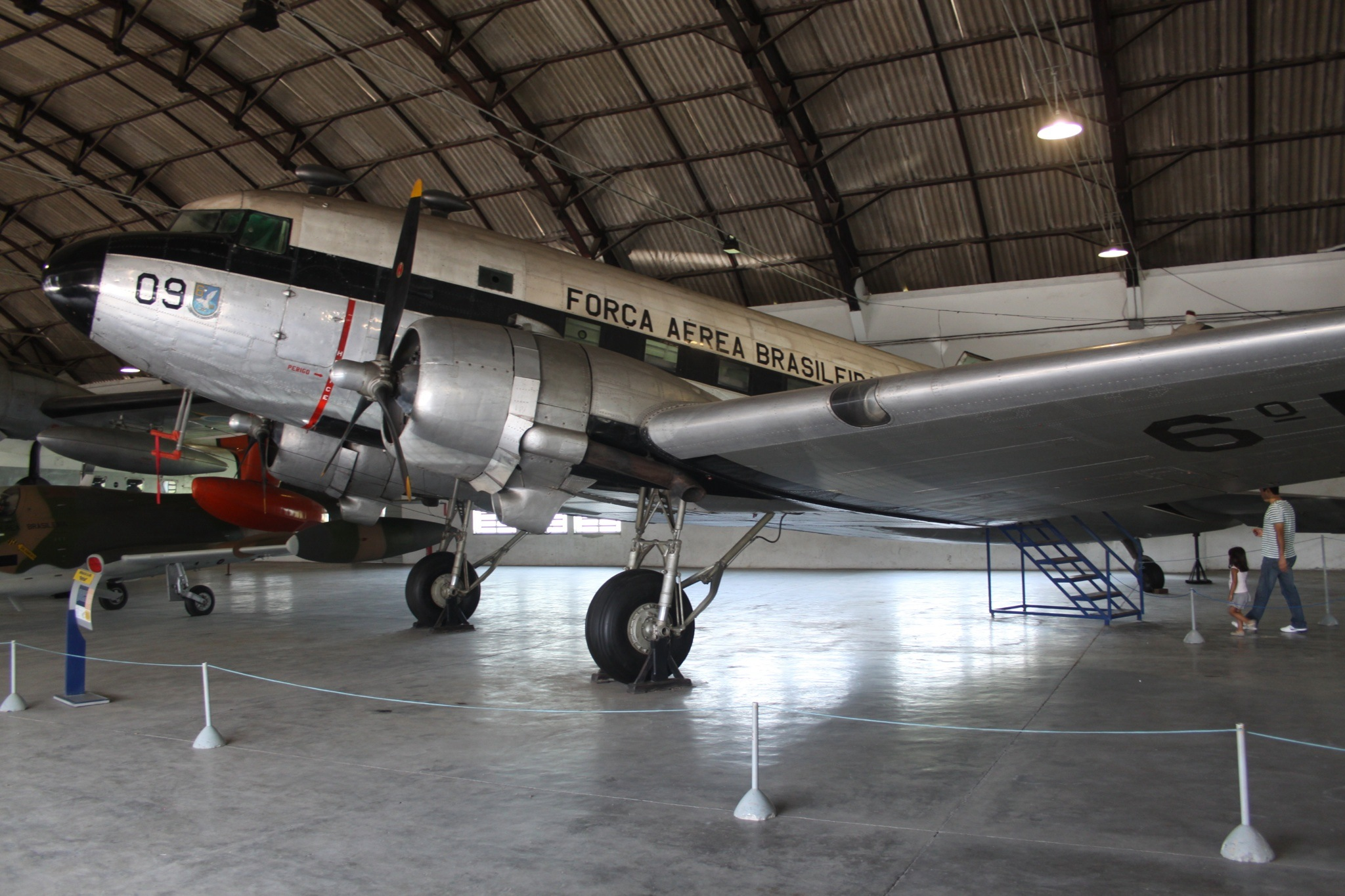
Douglas C-47 Dakota

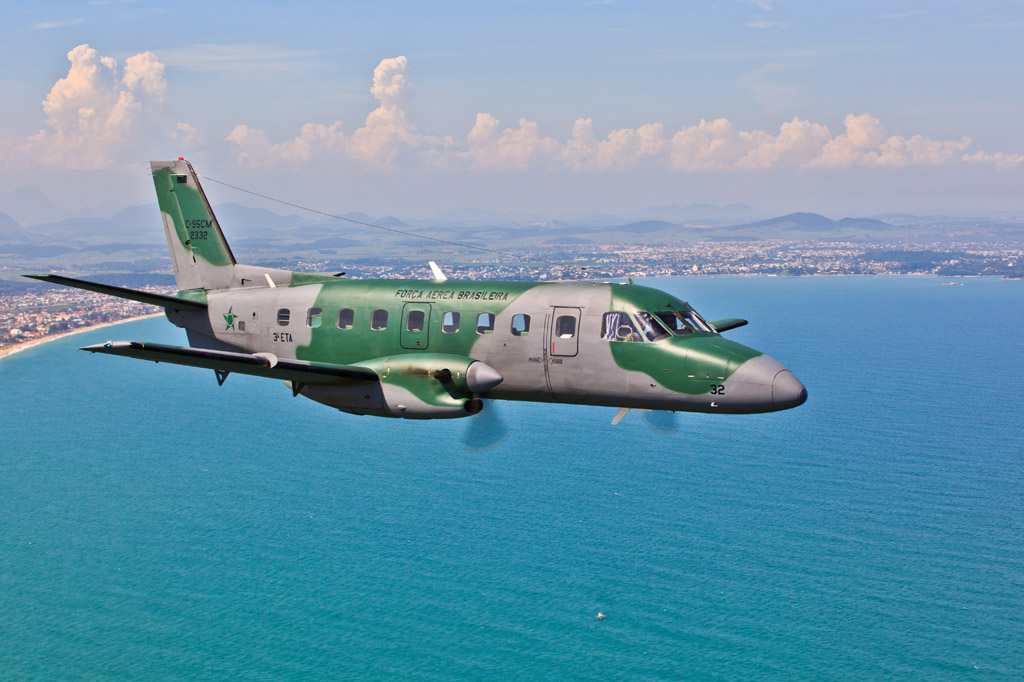
Embraer C-95B Bandeirante (FAB)

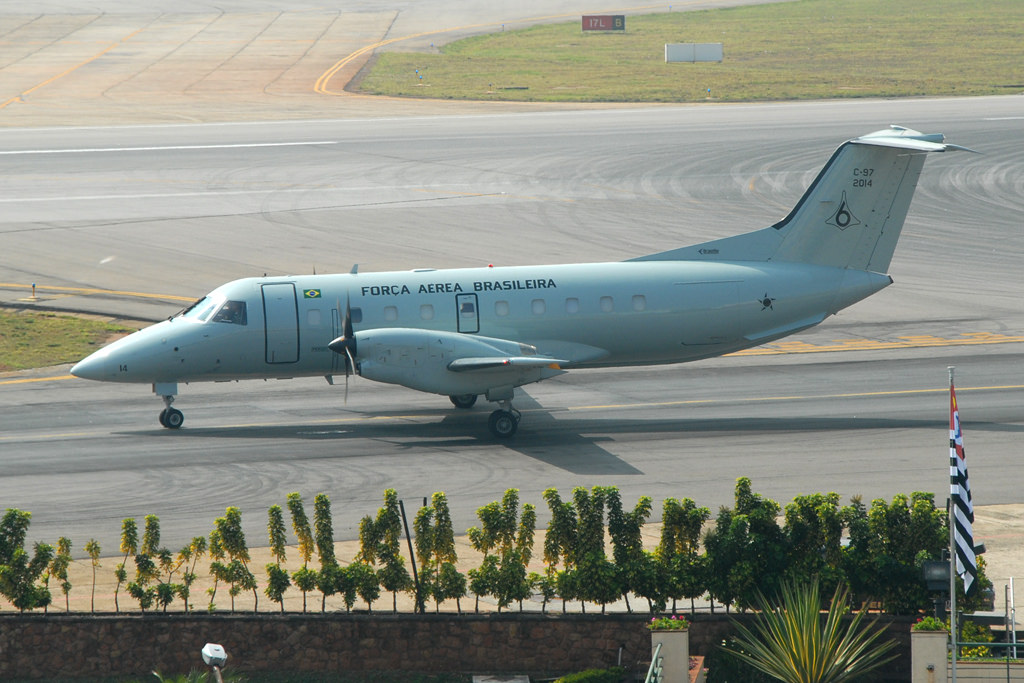
Embraer C-97 Brasília (FAB)

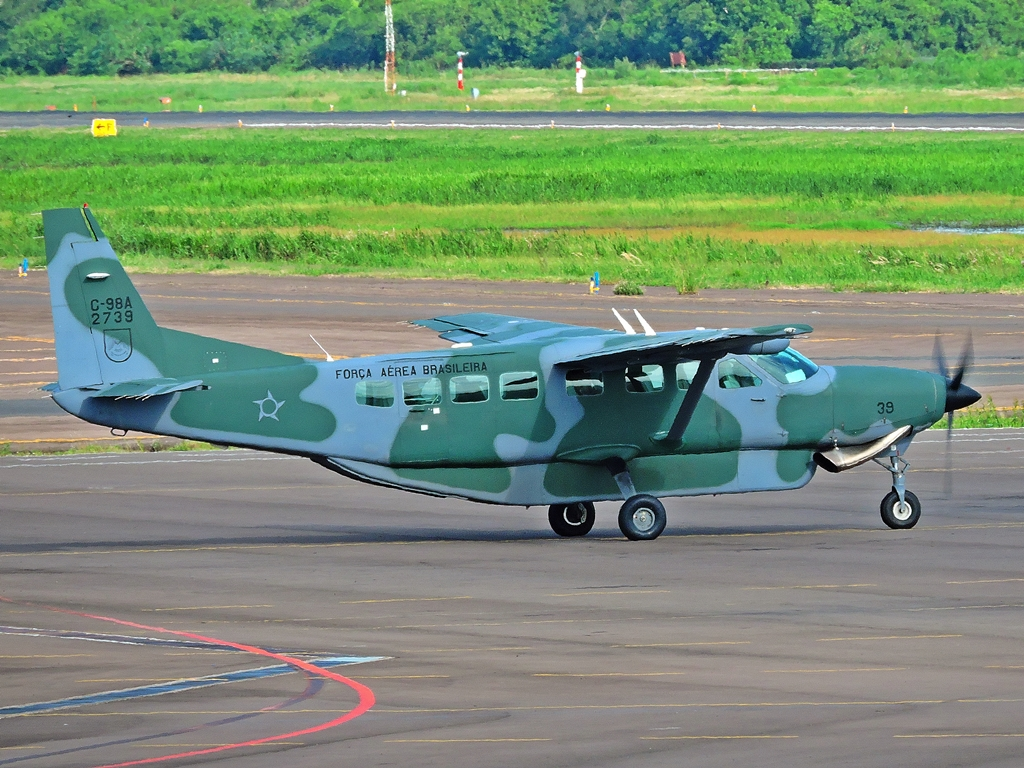
Cessna C-98A Caravan (FAB)

== See also ==
- List of Brazilian military bases
- Recife/Guararapes–Gilberto Freyre International Airport
