= Recife/Guararapes International Airport =

International airport serving Recife, Brazil

Recife/Guararapes–Gilberto Freyre International Airport Aeroporto Internacional do Recife/Guararapes–Gilberto Freyre

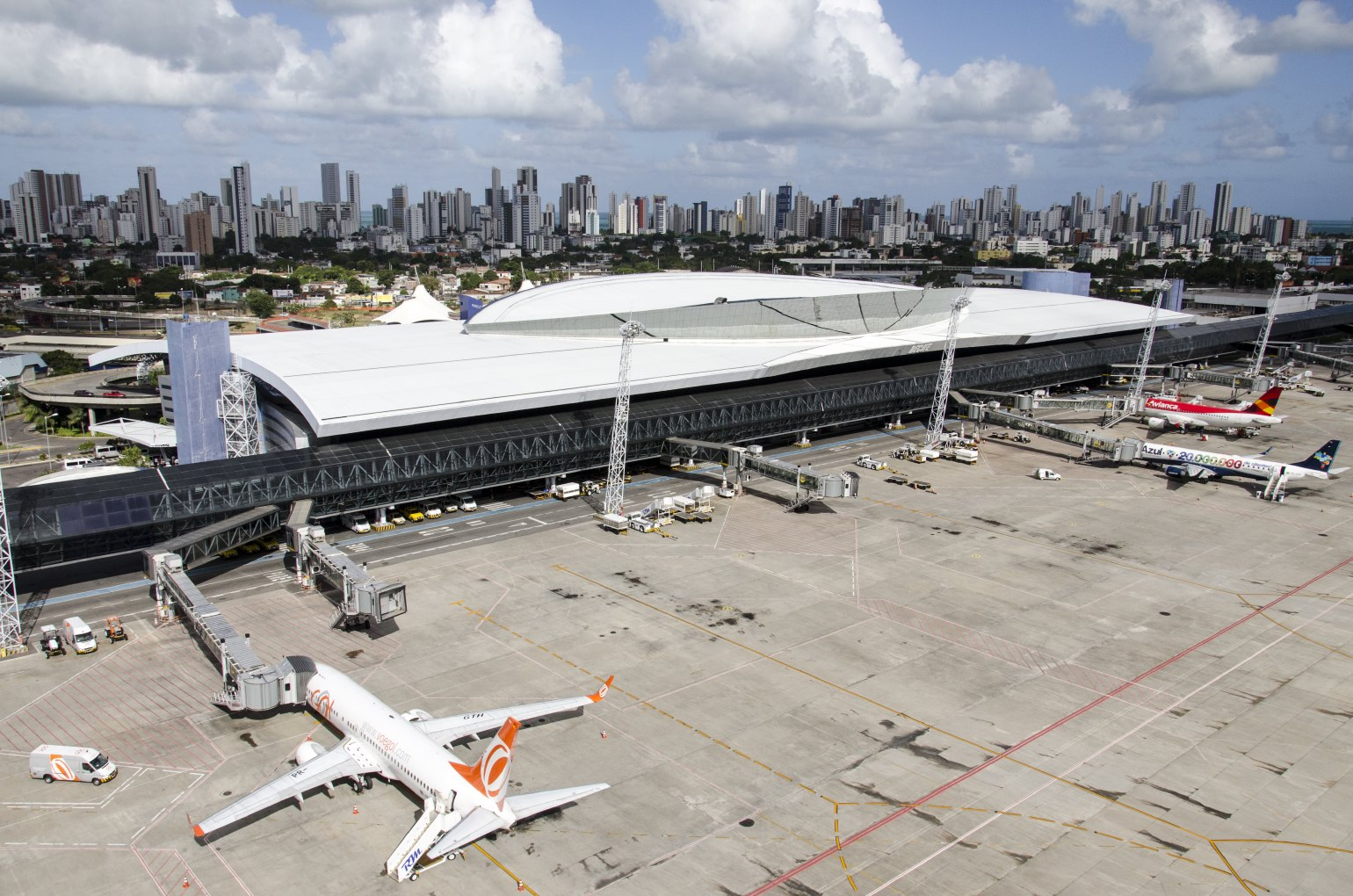
- IATA: REC; ICAO: SBRF; LID: PE0001

Summary
- Airport type: Public
- Operator: Infraero (1974–2019); AENA (2019–present)
- Serves: Recife, Pernambuco, Brazil
- Hub for: Azul Brazilian Airlines
- Focus city for: Gol Linhas Aéreas
- Time zone: BRT (UTC−03:00)
- Elevation AMSL: 10 m (33 ft)
- Coordinates: 08°07′35″S 034°55′22″W
- Website: Official website

Map
- Location in Brazil

Runways
Direction	Length		Surface
Direction	m	ft	Surface
18/36	2,751	9,026	Asphalt

Statistics (2025)
- Passengers: 9,938,051 ▲4%
- Aircraft Operations: 84,350 ▼8%
- Metric tonnes of cargo: 55,829
- Statistics: AENA; Sources: Airport Website, ANAC, DECEA

Recife/Guararapes–Gilberto Freyre International Airport (IATA: REC, ICAO: SBRF) is an international airport serving Recife, Brazil. Since 27 December 2001 it is named after the Recife-born Anthropologist and Sociologist Gilberto de Mello Freyre (1900–1987). Some of its facilities are shared with the Recife Air Force Base of the Brazilian Air Force.

Since 2019, it has been operated by AENA Brasil.

== History ==
Originally called Ibura Airport, the airport had its name changed to Guararapes Airport in 1948. The facility originated during World War II, when a new airport was built to replace the earlier airfield, Parque do Encanta Moça. With the end of the War, the facility became strategically important as a technical and refueling stop on the route from South America to Europe.

On 21 July 1953, within a law prescribing rules for the naming of airports, the name of the facility was officially and exceptionally maintained as Guararapes Airport.

On 18 January 1958, a new passenger terminal was inaugurated, replacing the original facility. During this time, runway 14/32 was extended from 1,800 to 2,010 m (5,910 to 6,590 ft), and runway 18/36 was extended from 1,800 m to 2,400 m (7,900 ft).

In 1979, an agreement with Infraero was made in order to further develop the airport complex. The passenger terminal underwent its first major renovation in 1982, and another enlargement occurred in 1990.

In 2004, a brand-new passenger terminal was built, including a new shopping mall, thus generating more traffic and revenue. Furthermore, a new concourse was opened in 2004, and the airport's capacity increased from 1.5 to 9 million passengers/year. The runway was once 3,300 meters (10,800 feet) long, however, in late 2023, the airport underwent a major modernization, including adding extra safe zones to the runway at both ends, which shortened the runway to 2,751 meters (9,026 feet).

On 31 August 2009, Infraero unveiled a BRL 8.75 million (US$4.6 million; EUR 3.2 million) investment plan to upgrade Guararapes International Airport, focusing on the preparations for the 2014 FIFA World Cup in Brazil, Recife being one of the venue cities. The investment was spent in finishing the passenger terminal renovation and installing eight more jetways. The work was completed on 1 July 2011, and the airport was then considered ready for the FIFA Cup.

Responding to critiques to the situation of its airports, on 18 May 2011, Infraero released a list evaluating some of its most important airports according to its saturation levels. According to the list, Recife was considered to be in good situation, operating with less than 70% of its capacity.

Previously operated by Infraero, on 15 March 2019, AENA won a 30-year concession to operate the airport.

The Brazilian Integrated Air Traffic Control and Air Defense Center, section 3 (Cindacta III) is located in the vicinity of the airport.

The facility covers 319 hectares (788 acres) of land.

== Airlines and destinations ==
=== Passenger ===
Airlines	Destinations
Andes Líneas Aéreas	Seasonal charter: Buenos Aires–Ezeiza, Córdoba (AR)
Azul Brazilian Airlines	Aracaju, Belém, Belo Horizonte–Confins, Brasília, Campina Grande, Campinas, Fernando de Noronha, Fortaleza, Goiânia, João Pessoa, Maceió, Madrid, Manaus, Montevideo, Mossoró, Natal, Orlando, Petrolina, Porto, Porto Alegre, Rio de Janeiro–Galeão, Salvador da Bahia, São Luís, São Paulo–Congonhas, São Paulo–Guarulhos, Teresina, Vitória; Seasonal: Bauru/Arealva, Curitiba, Florianópolis, Foz do Iguaçu, Juazeiro do Norte, Ribeirão Preto, São José do Rio Preto
Azul Conecta	Araripina, Cajazeiras, Caruaru, Garanhuns, Patos
Cabo Verde Airlines	Praia, Sal (resumes 12 December 2026)
Gol Linhas Aéreas	Brasília, Buenos Aires–Aeroparque (ends 30 January 2027), Cordoba (AR), Fernando de Noronha, Rio de Janeiro–Galeão, Salvador da Bahia, São Paulo–Congonhas, São Paulo–Guarulhos; Seasonal: Vitória
Iberia	Madrid
JetSmart Argentina	Buenos Aires–Aeroparque
JetSmart Chile	Seasonal: Montevideo, Santiago de Chile
LATAM Brasil	Brasília, Fortaleza, Petrolina, Santiago de Chile, São Paulo–Congonhas, São Paulo–Guarulhos; Seasonal: Buenos Aires–Ezeiza, Rio de Janeiro–Galeão
TAP Air Portugal	Lisbon

=== Cargo ===
Airlines	Destinations
LATAM Cargo Brasil	Miami
Lufthansa Cargo	Campinas, Curitiba, Frankfurt
Modern Logistics	Brasília, Campinas, Manaus

== Statistics ==
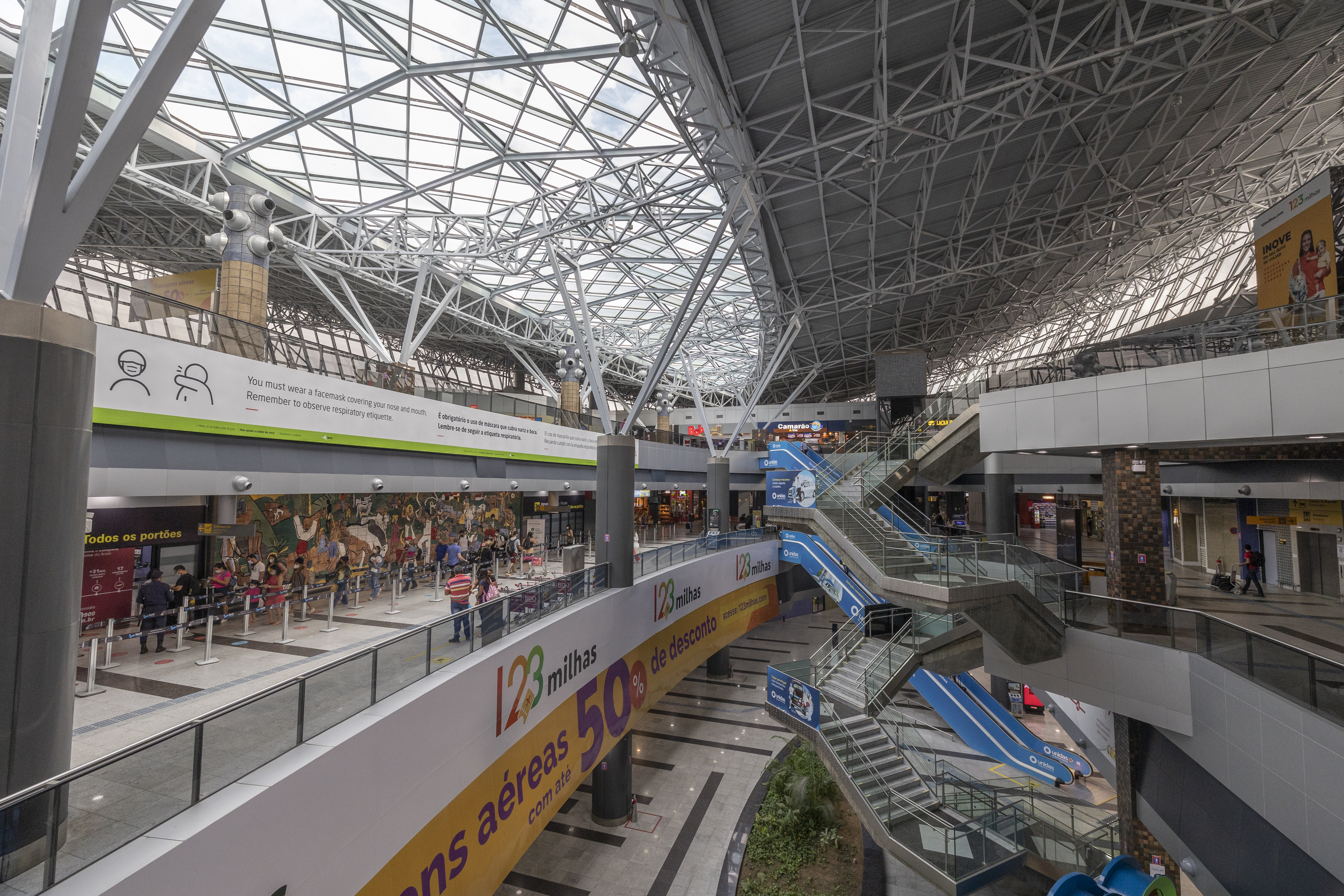
Terminal interior

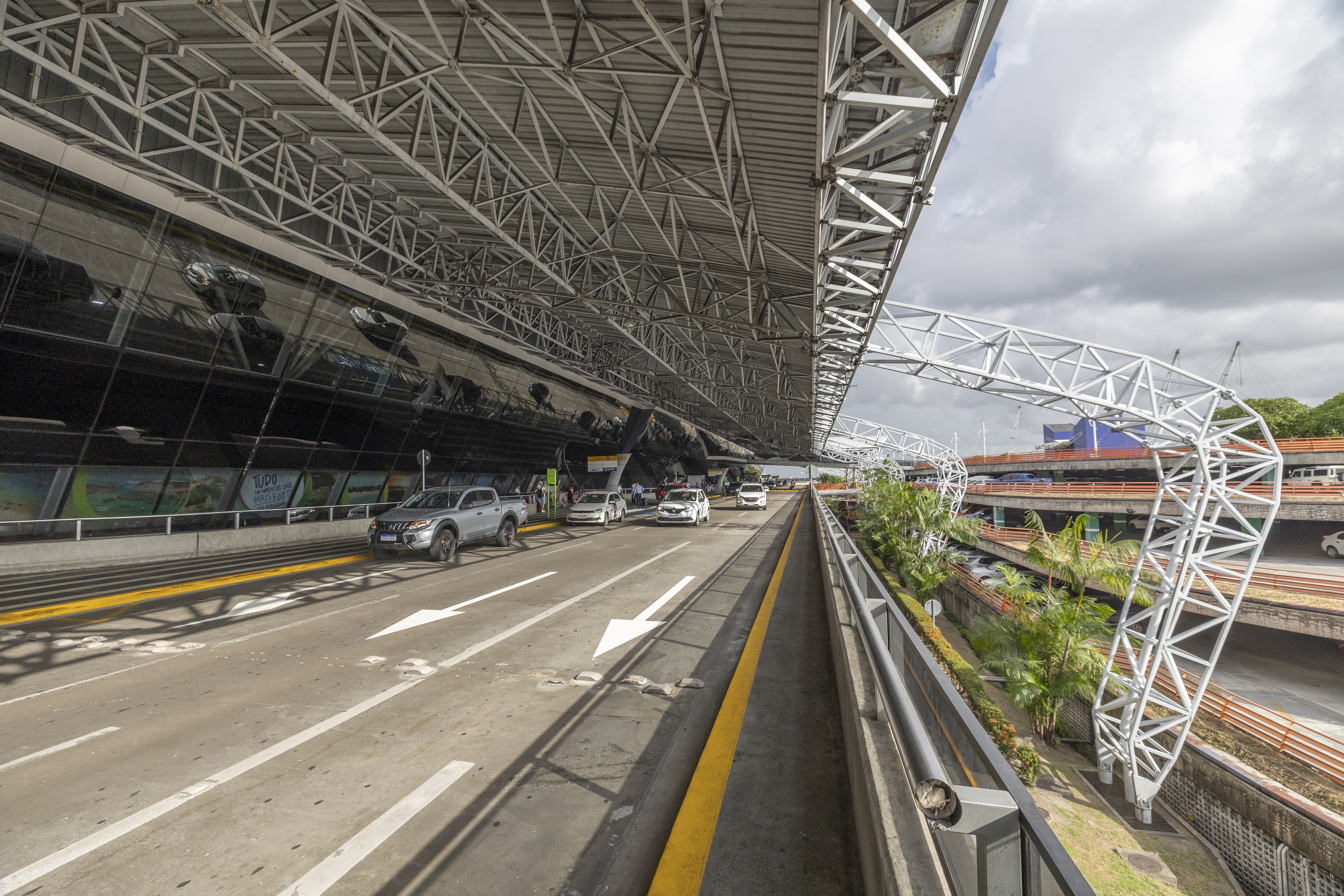
Airport parking

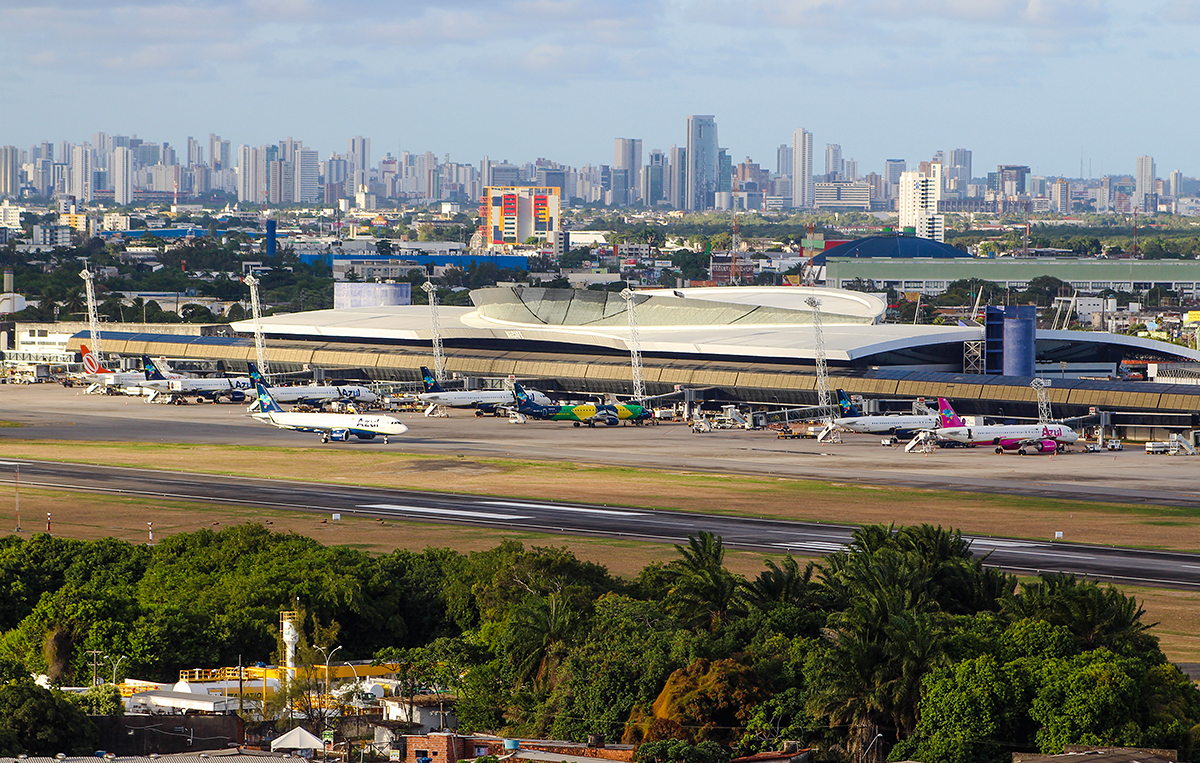
Terminal air side

Following are the number of passenger, aircraft and cargo movements at the airport, according to Infraero (2007–2019) and AENA (2020–2025) reports:

Year	Passenger	Aircraft	Cargo (t)
2025	9,938,051 ▲4%	84,350 ▼8%	55,829
2024	9,593,804 ▲6%	91,314 ▲8%	55,970 ▲11%
2023	9,046,145 ▲4%	84,516 ▲5%	50,756 ▼19%
2022	8,725,495 ▲16%	80,230 ▲10%	62,817 ▲3%
2021	7,523,046 ▲56%	73,247 ▲52%	61,020 ▲63%
2020	4,836,890 ▼44%	48,044 ▼41%	37,543 ▼17%
2019	8,714,119 ▲3%	80,887 ▲3%	45,111 ▲2%
2018	8,422,566 ▲8%	78,766 ▲5%	44,442 ▲26%
2017	7,776,881 ▲14%	75,099 ▲9%	35,310 ▲21%
2016	6,811,676 ▲2%	69,108 ▼4%	29,218 ▼11%
2015	6,700,696 ▼7%	72,080 ▼4%	32,912 ▼8%
2014	7,190,381 ▲5%	75,418 ▼8%	35,625 ▲13%
2013	6,840,276 ▲6%	81,824 ▼1%	31,494 ▼3%
2012	6,433,410 ▲1%	82,997 ▼1%	32,483 ▼33%
2011	6,383,369 ▲7%	83,638 ▲8%	48,152 ▲27%
2010	5,958,982 ▲13%	77,322 ▲16%	38,018 ▼15%
2009	5,250,565 ▲12%	66,415 ▲3%	44,758 ▼22%
2008	4,679,457 ▲12%	64,625 ▲8%	57,264 ▼5%
2007	4,188,081	59,781	60,381

== Accidents and incidents ==
- 1 November 1961: a Panair do Brasil Douglas DC-7C registration PP-PDO flying from Sal to Recife, during its final approach struck an 84-m hill 2.7 km from the runway and broke up. The aircraft was doing a night approach too low and outside the regular traffic pattern. Forty-five passengers and crew out of the 88 persons aboard died. The aircraft was operating the Voo da amizade (Friendship Flight).
- 11 November 1991: a Nordeste Embraer EMB110P1 Bandeirante registration PT-SCU, operating flight 115 from Recife to Maceió, during an initial climb had an engine failure followed by fire. The aircraft crashed on a populated area. All 13 aircraft occupants and 2 persons on the ground died.
- 23 November 2008: a private Beechcraft Super King Air registration PT-OSR operating for Banda Calypso crashed 5 km (3.1 mi) N on final approach to Recife when both engines quit possibly because of fuel starvation and carried out a forced landing in a residential area. Two occupants, the pilot and the producer, out of 10 on board died.
- 13 July 2011: a Noar Linhas Aéreas Let L-410 Turbolet registration PR-NOB operating flight 4896 from Recife to Natal crashed shortly after take-off from Recife. All 16 occupants were killed.

== Access ==
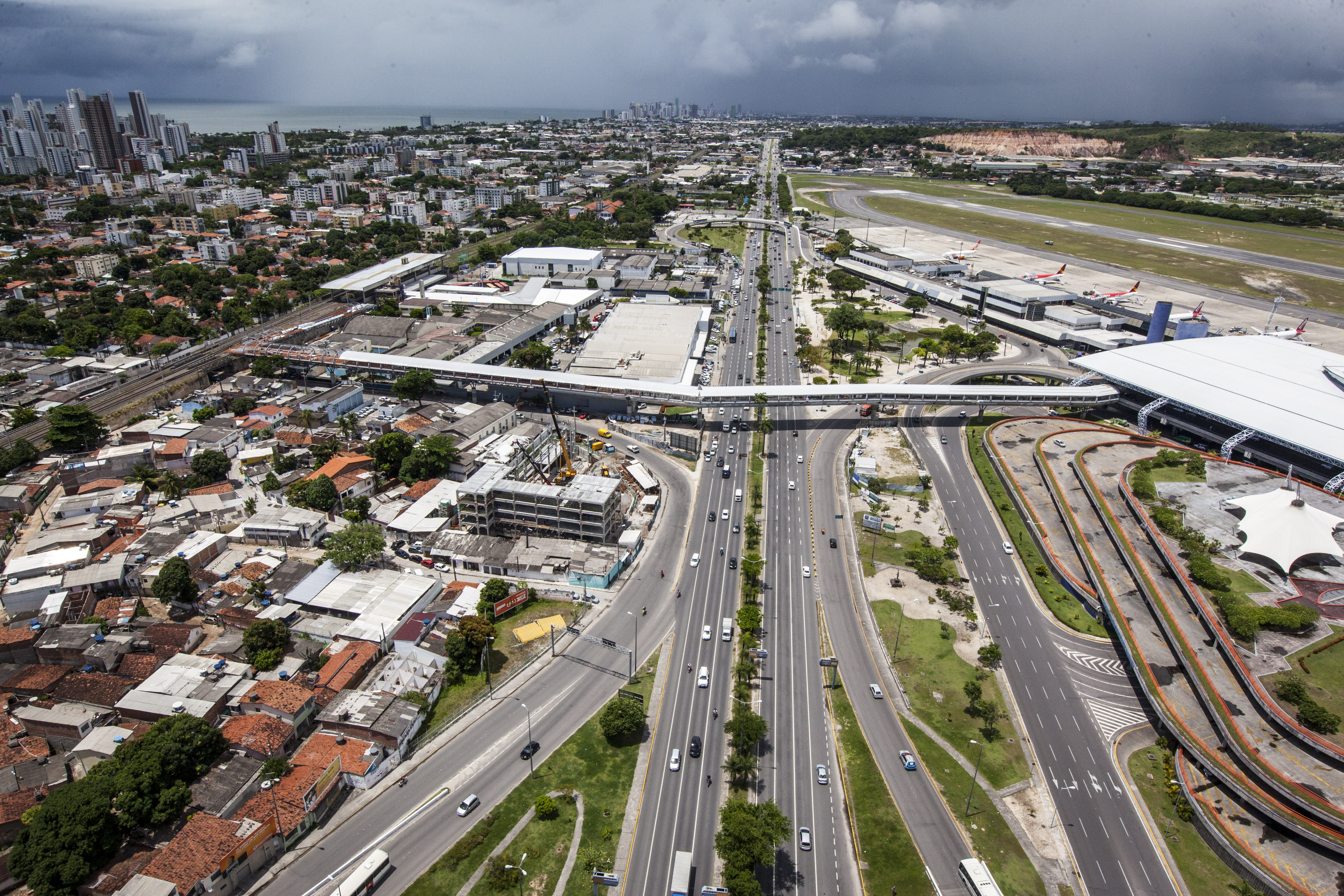
Aerial view of the Recife airport area, where the white walkway directly connecting the terminal to the Recife Metro can be distinguished.

The airport is located 14 km (9 mi) from downtown Recife.

The Recife International Airport has a direct connection to the Recife Metro via the Airport Station, which is located just a few meters from the terminal and accessible by a covered walkway.

Besides, there are bus lines that serve the neighborhoods of Boa Viagem and Cidade Universitária, in Recife, and Piedade, in Jaboatão dos Guararapes.

== See also ==
- List of airports in Brazil
- Recife Air Force Base
