= List of capitals of subdivisions of Brazil =

This is a list of the cities that are or have been considered capitals of one of the country subdivisions of Brazil.

== State capitals ==
=== Acre ===
created out of Bolivia

- Porto Acre, present Xapuri (1899-1903) - seat city for the Independent State of Acre
- Rio Branco (1920–1963) - seat city for the territory do Acre
- Rio Branco (1963–present) - seat city for the State of Acre

=== Alagoas ===
created out of Pernambuco

- Alagoas (1817–1822) - seat city for the Captaincy of Alagoas
- Alagoas (1822–1839) - capital city for the Province of Alagoas
- Maceió (1839–present) - capital city for the Province of Alagoas
- Maceió (1889–present) - capital city for the State of Alagoas

=== Amapá ===
created out of Pará

- Macapá (1943–1988) - seat city for the territory do Amapá
- Macapá (1988–present) - seat city for the State of Amapá

=== Amazonas ===
created out of Pará

- Mariuá (1755–1791) - seat city for the Captaincy of São José do Rio Negro
- São José da Barra do Rio Negro (1791–1799) - seat city for the Captaincy of São José do Rio Negro
- Mariuá (1799–1808) - seat city for the Captaincy of São José do Rio Negro
- São José da Barra do Rio Negro (1808–1822) - seat city for the Captaincy of São José do Rio Negro; since 1856, named Manaus
- subject to the Province of Grão-Pará (1822–1850)
- Manaus (1850–1889) - seat city for the Province of Amazonas
- Manaus (1889–present) - seat city for the State of Amazonas

=== Bahia ===
- Cidade do São Salvador da Bahia de Todos os Santos (1549–1709) - seat city for the Captaincy of Baía de Todos os Santos
- Salvador (1709–1889) - seat city for the Captaincy of Bahia
- Salvador (1822–1889) - seat city for the Province of Bahia
- Salvador (1889–present) - seat city for the State of Bahia

=== Ceará ===
- Fortaleza (1799–1822) - seat city for the Captaincy of Ceará
- Fortaleza (1822–1889) - seat city for the Province of Ceará
- Fortaleza (1889–present) - seat city for the State of Ceará

=== Espírito Santo ===
- Vitória (1812–1822) - seat city for the Captaincy of Espírito Santo
- Vitória (1822–1889) - seat city for the Province of Espírito Santo
- Vitória (1889–present) - seat city for the State of Espírito Santo

=== Goiás ===
created out of São Paulo

- Goiás (1748–1822) - seat city for the Captaincy of Goiás
- Goiás (1822–1889) - seat city for the Province of Goiás
- Goiás (1889–1937) - seat city for the State of Goiás
- Goiânia (1937–present) - seat city for the State of Goiás

=== Maranhão ===
created out of Pará

- São Luís (1772–1822) - seat city for the Captaincy of Maranhão and Piauí
- São Luís (1822–1889) - seat city for the Province of Maranhão
- São Luís (1889–present) - seat city for the State of Maranhão

=== Mato Grosso ===
created out of São Paulo

- Vila Bela da Santíssima Trindade (1748–1821) - seat city for the Captaincy of Mato Grosso
- Cuiabá (1821–1889) - seat city for the Province of Mato Grosso
- Cuiabá (1889–present) - seat city for the State of Mato Grosso

=== Mato Grosso do Sul ===
created out of Mato Grosso

- Campo Grande (1975–present) - seat city for the State of Mato Grosso do Sul

=== Minas Gerais ===
created out of São Paulo

- Vila Rica (1720–1822) - since 1822, named Ouro Preto; seat city for the Captaincy of Minas Gerais
- Ouro Preto (1822–1889) - seat city for the Province of Minas Gerais
- Ouro Preto (1889–1897) - seat city for the State of Minas Gerais
- Belo Horizonte (1897–present) - seat city for the State of Minas Gerais

=== Pará ===
- Belém (1737–1772) - seat city for the State of Grão-Pará and Maranhão
- Belém (1772–1822) - seat city for the State of Grão-Pará and Rio Negro
- Belém (1822–1850) - seat city for the Province of Grão-Pará
- Belém (1850–1889) - seat city for the Province of Pará
- Belém (1889–present) - seat city for the State of Pará

=== Paraíba ===
- without a seat Captaincy of Itamaracá (1534–1574)
- capitania extinta (1574–1585)
- Nossa Senhora das Neves (1585–1588)
- Filipéia (1588–1634)
- Frederikstadt (1634–1654)
- Nossa Senhora das Neves (1654–1753) - seat city for the Captaincy of Paraíba
- subject to the Captaincy of Pernambuco (1753–1799)
- Paraíba do Norte (1799–1817) - seat city for the Captaincy of Paraíba
- Paraíba do Norte (1817–1822) - seat city for the Captaincy of Paraíba
- Paraíba (1822–1889) - seat city for the Province of Paraíba
- João Pessoa (1889–present) - até 1930, named "Cidade da Paraíba"

=== Paraná ===
created out of São Paulo

- Curitiba (1853–1889) - seat city for the Province of Paraná
- Curitiba (1889–present) - seat city for the State of Paraná

=== Pernambuco ===
- Olinda (1537–1630) - seat city for the Captaincy of Pernambuco
- Mauritsstad or Cidade Maurícia (1630–1654) - seat city for the Dutch administration.
- Olinda (1654–1822) - seat city for the Captaincy of Pernambuco
- Olinda (1822–1837) - seat city for the Province of Pernambuco
- Recife (1837–1889) - seat city for the Province of Pernambuco
- Recife (1889–present) - seat city for the State of Pernambuco

=== Piauí ===
created out of Maranhão

- Parnaíba (1718–1759) - seat city for the Captaincy of Piauí (subject to Maranhão)
- Oeiras (1759–1811) - seat city for the Captaincy of Piauí (subject to Maranhão)
- Oeiras (1811–1822) - seat city for the Captaincy of Piauí
- Oeiras (1822–1852) - seat city for the Province of Piauí
- Teresina (1852–1889) - seat city for the Province of Piauí
- Teresina (1889–present) - seat city for the State of Piauí

=== Rio Grande do Norte ===
- Captaincy of Rio Grande, sem sede (1534–1634)
- subject to the Dutch administration (1634–1654)
- subject to the Captaincy of Bahia (1654–1701)
- subject to the Captaincy of Pernambuco (1701–1822)
- Natal (1822–1889) - seat city for the Province of Rio Grande do Norte
- Natal (1889–present) - seat city for the State of Rio Grande do Norte

=== Rio Grande do Sul ===
- Viamão (until 1773)
- Porto Alegre (1773–1807) - named "Porto dos Casais" until 1773
- Porto Alegre (1807–1822) - seat city for the Captaincy of São Pedro and Rio Grande do Sul
- Porto Alegre (1822–1889) - seat city for the Province of Rio Grande do Sul
- Porto Alegre (1889–present) - seat city for the State of Rio Grande do Sul

=== Rio de Janeiro ===
- Niterói (1834–1889) - até 1835, named "Vila Real da Praia Grande"; seat city for the Province of Rio de Janeiro
- Niterói (1889–1892) - seat city for the State of Rio de Janeiro
- Petrópolis (1894–1903) - seat city for the State of Rio de Janeiro
- Niterói (1903–1975) - seat city for the State of Rio de Janeiro
- Rio de Janeiro (1975–present) - seat city for the State of Rio de Janeiro

=== Rondônia ===
Created in 1943 under the name of "territory of Guaporé", out of Mato Grosso. Reorganised into the State of Rondônia in 1988.

- Porto Velho (1988–present)

=== Roraima ===
Created in 1943 under the name of "territory of Rio Branco", out of Amazonas. Reorganised into the State of Roraima in 1988.

- Boa Vista (1988–present) - formerly named "Rio Branco"

=== Santa Catarina ===
created out of São Paulo

- Nossa Senhora do Desterro (1738–1822) - seat city for the Captaincy of Santa Catarina
- Nossa Senhora do Desterro (1822–1889) - seat city for the Province of Santa Catarina
  - Laguna (1839) - seat city for the República Juliana
- Florianópolis (1889–present) - until 1894, named "Nossa Senhora do Desterro"; seat city for the State of Santa Catarina

=== São Paulo ===
- São Vicente (1534–1709) - seat city for the Captaincy of São Vicente
  - Santos (1534–1624) - seat city for the Captaincy of Santo Amaro
- São Paulo (1709–1720) - seat city for the Captaincy of São Paulo and Minas de Ouro
- São Paulo (1720–1821) - seat city for the Captaincy of São Paulo
- São Paulo (1821–1889) - seat city for the Province of São Paulo
- São Paulo (since 1889) - seat city for the State of São Paulo

=== Sergipe ===
created out of Bahia

- São Cristóvão (1820–1822) - seat city for the Captaincy of Sergipe
- São Cristóvão (1822–1855) - seat city for the Province of Sergipe
- Aracaju (1855–1889) - seat city for the Province of Sergipe
- Aracaju (1889–present) - seat city for the State of Sergipe

=== Tocantins ===
created out of Goiás

- Palmas (1988–present)

== Extinct federated units ==
=== Guanabara ===
Created in 1960 out of the territory of former Distrito Federal. Merged with the State of Rio de Janeiro in 1975.

- Rio de Janeiro (1960–1975)

=== Fernando de Noronha ===
Created in 1943 under the name of "territory de Fernando de Noronha". Incorporated by Pernambuco state.

- Vila dos Remédios (main inhabited nucleus of Fernando de Noronha (1943–1988) )

=== Iguaçu ===
Created in 1943 under the name de "territory do Iguaçu". Merged back to Paraná and the Santa Catarina.

- Laranjeiras do Sul (1943–1946)

=== Ponta-Porã ===
Created in 1943 under the name de "territory de Ponta-Porã". Merged back to Mato Grosso.

- Ponta Porã (1943–1946)

=== São João da Palma ===
Built in 1808 as captaincy by decree of King João VI under the name "São João das Duas Barras", was abolished in 1814. Recreated as an autonomous province in 1821 under the name of "São João da Palma", extinct in 1823 by Pedro I of Brazil. Today part of Pará and Tocantins.

- Barra do Tacay-Una (currently Marabá) (1808-1810)
- Vila de Palma (currently Paranã) (1810-1814)
- Cavalcante (1821-1823)

== Former territories of Brazil ==
=== Cisplatina ===
- Montevidéu (1809–1828)

=== Guiana Francesa ===
- Caiena (1809–1817)

== See also ==
- Capital of Brazil
