= Vila dos Remédios =

- Urban Center
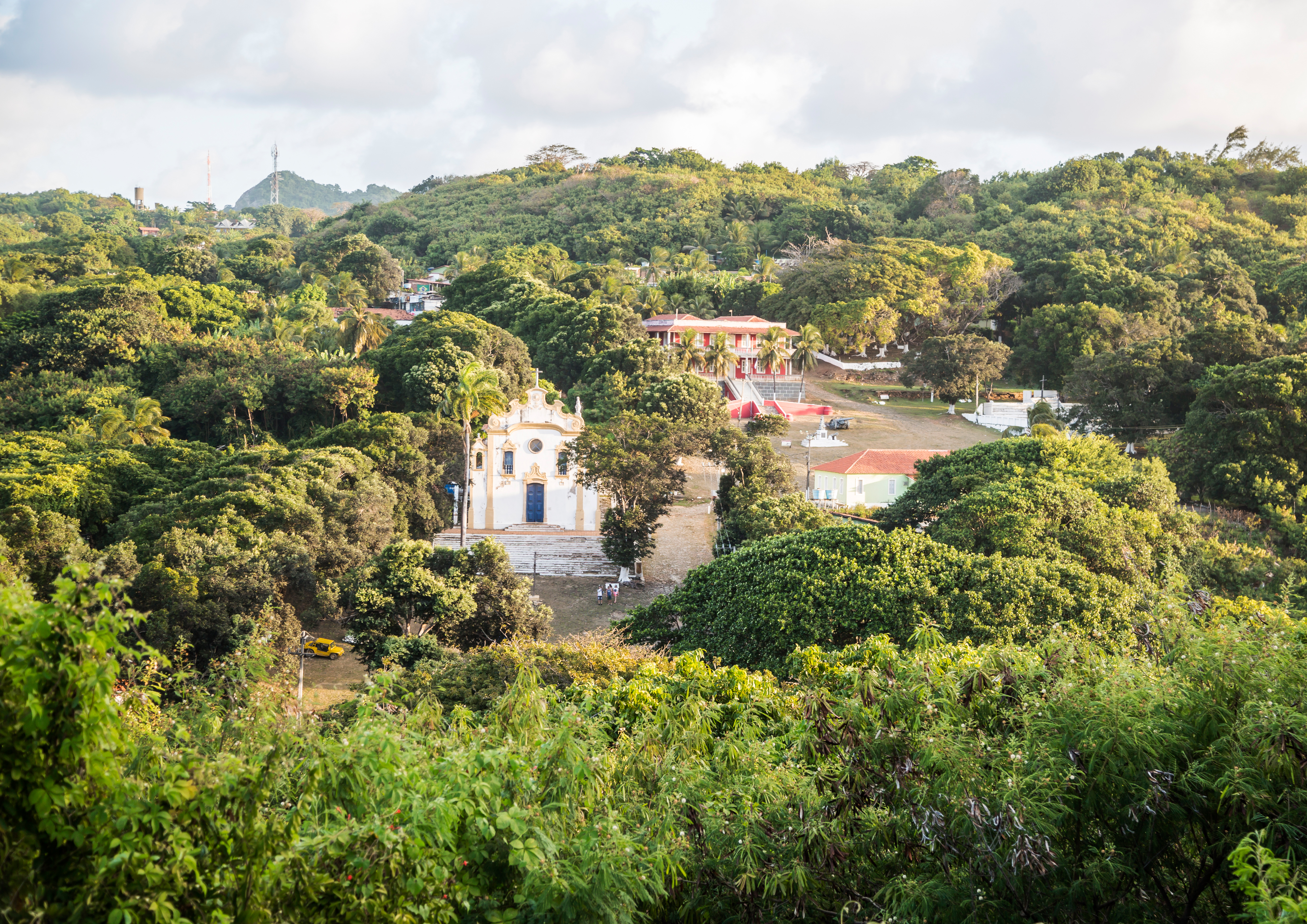
- View of Vila dos Remédios in 2018

- Flag

- Map of Fernando de Noronha with Vila dos Remédios marked with a star

- Location within Brazil
- Country: Brazil
- State: Pernambuco
- District: Fernando de Noronha
- Named after: The Virgin of Los Remedios
- Time zone: UTC−02 (Fernando de Noronha Standard Time)

Vila dos Remédios is an urban center and the largest settlement in the Brazilian state district and archipelago, Fernando de Noronha, in Pernambuco state.

== History ==
The island of Fernando de Noronha was first recorded in 1500 by Spanish cartographer Juan de La Cosa. In 1502, Alberto Cantino documented it as "Quaresma." In 1503, navigator Amerigo Vespucci visited the island in an expedition to the Brazilian coast under the command of Gonçalo Coelho and with the financial backing of Fernão de Loronha. Vespucci described the island as a "paradise" and referred to it as "the island of St. Lawrence." In 1505, the island was given to de Laronha by Portuguese King Manuel, becoming the first Hereditary Captaincy of Brazil.

Fernando de Noronha was first settled by the Dutch from 1635 to 1654, who called it "Pavônia." They were the first to fortify the island and use it as a prison, a practice which lasted until 1942. The Dutch built a small redoubt in the place, which would later be known as Vila dos Remédios. The French briefly occupied the island in 1736 and referred to the island as "Ile Delphine."

In 1737, the Portuguese took control of the island under the Captaincy of Pernambuco and founded the town of Nossa Senhora dos Remédios (now known as Vila dos Remédios). The town began as a Portuguese fortress, which included two courtyards, a bastion, the Church of Nossa Senhora dos Remédios, two prisons, and several other buildings.

In 1938, the federal government took control of Fernando de Noronha, and the prisons in Vila de Remédios were used to house political prisoners. This practice lasted until 1942, when, during World War II, the island was jointly occupied by Brazilian and U.S. armed forces. The Brazilian military controlled the island until 1988, when it was annexed by Pernambuco.

== Gallery ==
Images of Vila dos Remédios
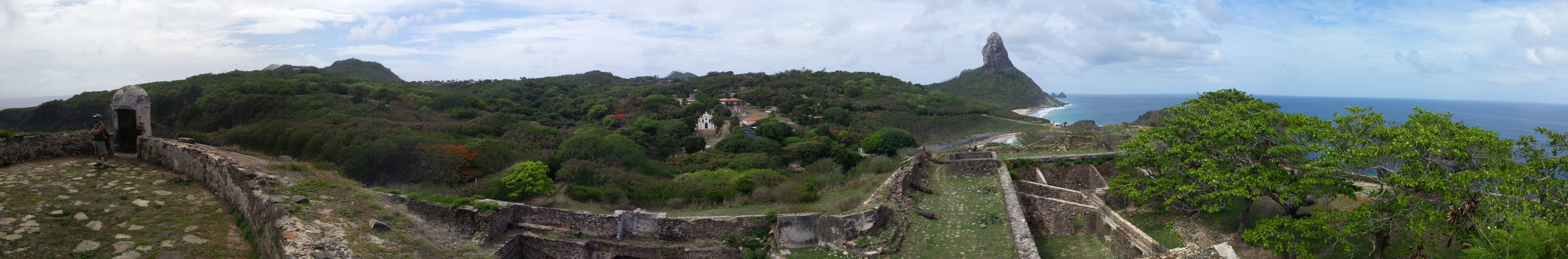
Panmoramic view of Vila dos Remédios

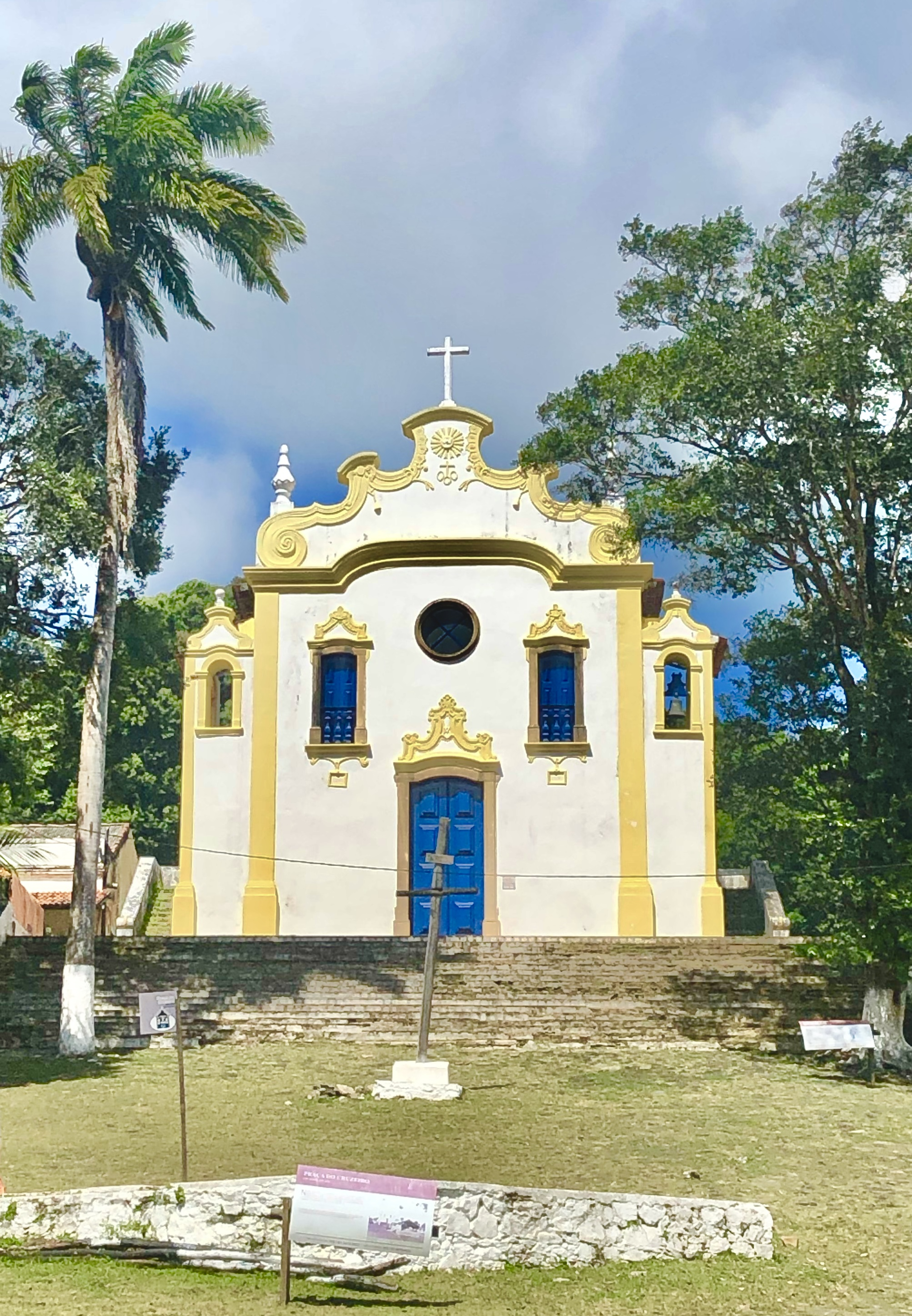
Church of Our Lady of Remedies in Vila dos Remédios

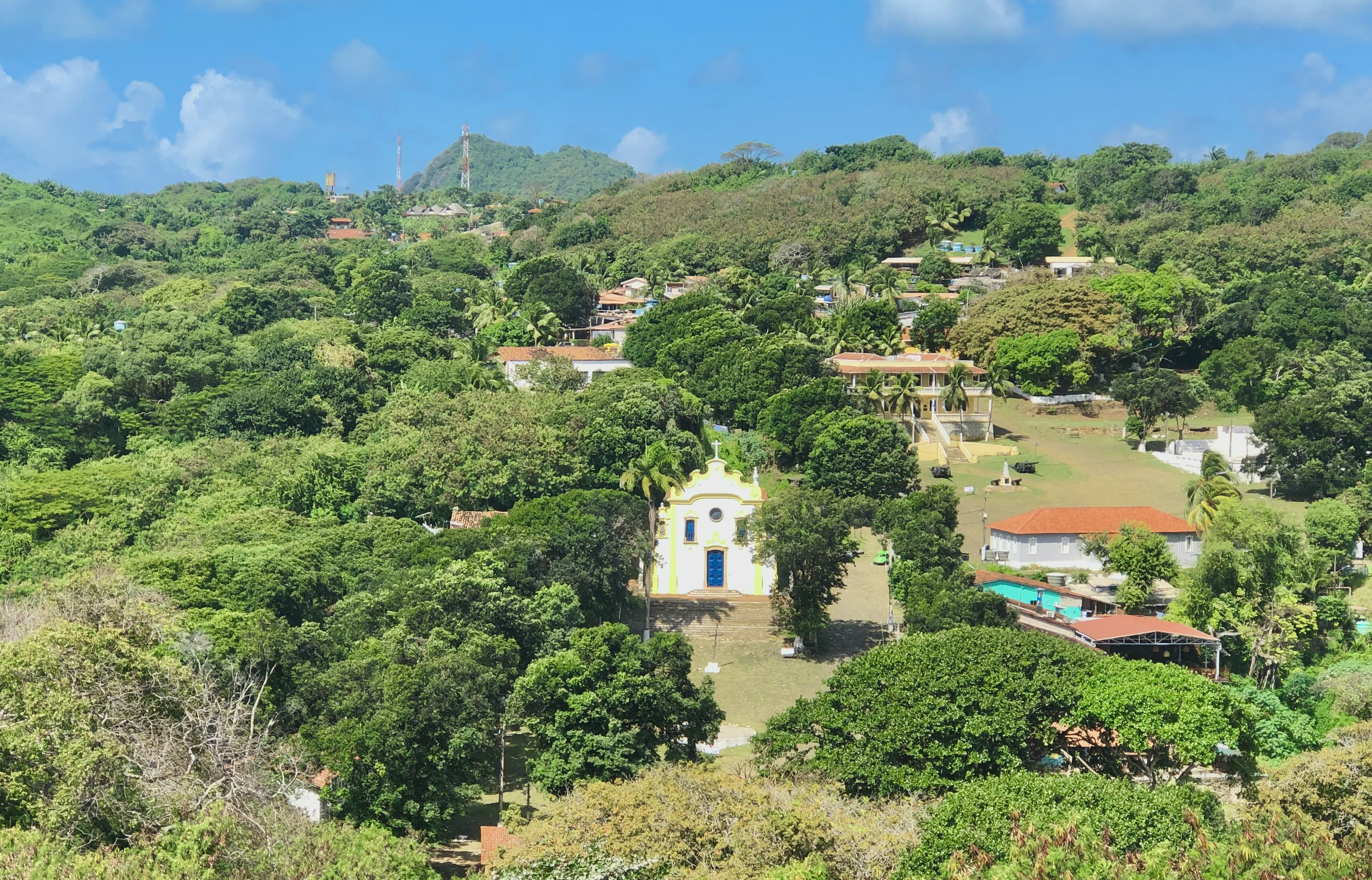
Vila dos Remédios
