= Mossoró Airport =

Gov. Dix-Sept Rosado Municipal Airport Aeroporto Municipal Gov. Dix-Sept Rosado
- IATA: MVF; ICAO: SBMS; LID: RN0002

Summary
- Airport type: Public
- Operator: Infracea (2018–2022); Infraero (2022–present)
- Serves: Mossoró
- Time zone: BRT (UTC−03:00)
- Elevation AMSL: 23 m (75 ft)
- Coordinates: 05°11′45″S 037°21′42″W
- Website: www4.infraero.gov.br/aeroporto-mossoro/

Map
- Location in Brazil

Runways
Direction	Length		Surface
Direction	m	ft	Surface
05/23	1,900	6,234	Asphalt

Statistics (2025)
- Passengers: 3,387 ▼94%
- Aircraft Operations: 1,484 ▼43%
- Metric tonnes of cargo: 19 ▼85%
- Statistics: Infraero; Sources: Airport Website, ANAC, DECEA

Gov. Dix-Sept Rosado Municipal Airport (IATA: MVF, ICAO: SBMS) is the airport serving Mossoró, Brazil. Since May 27, 1953 the airport is named after Jerônimo Dix-Sept Rosado Maia (1911-1951), former mayor of Mossoró and Governor of Rio Grande do Norte, who died on a Lóide Aéreo Nacional air crash near Aracaju on July 12, 1951.

It is operated by Infraero.

== History ==
The airport was opened in 1945.

Previously managed by Infracea, on December 29, 2022 the Municipality of Mossoró signed a contract of operation with Infraero.

== Airlines and destinations ==
Airlines	Destinations
Azul Brazilian Airlines	Recife

== Access ==
The airport is located 2 km (1 mi) from downtown Mossoró.

== See also ==
- List of airports in Brazil
