= Oeiras, Piauí =

Oeiras
- Municipality
- Municipality of Oeiras
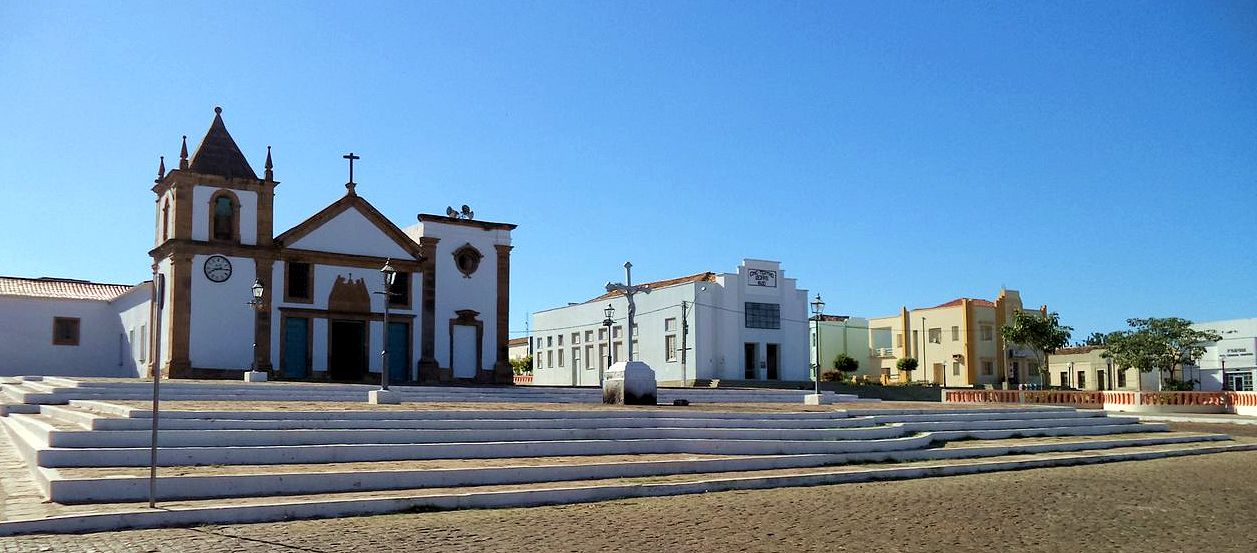
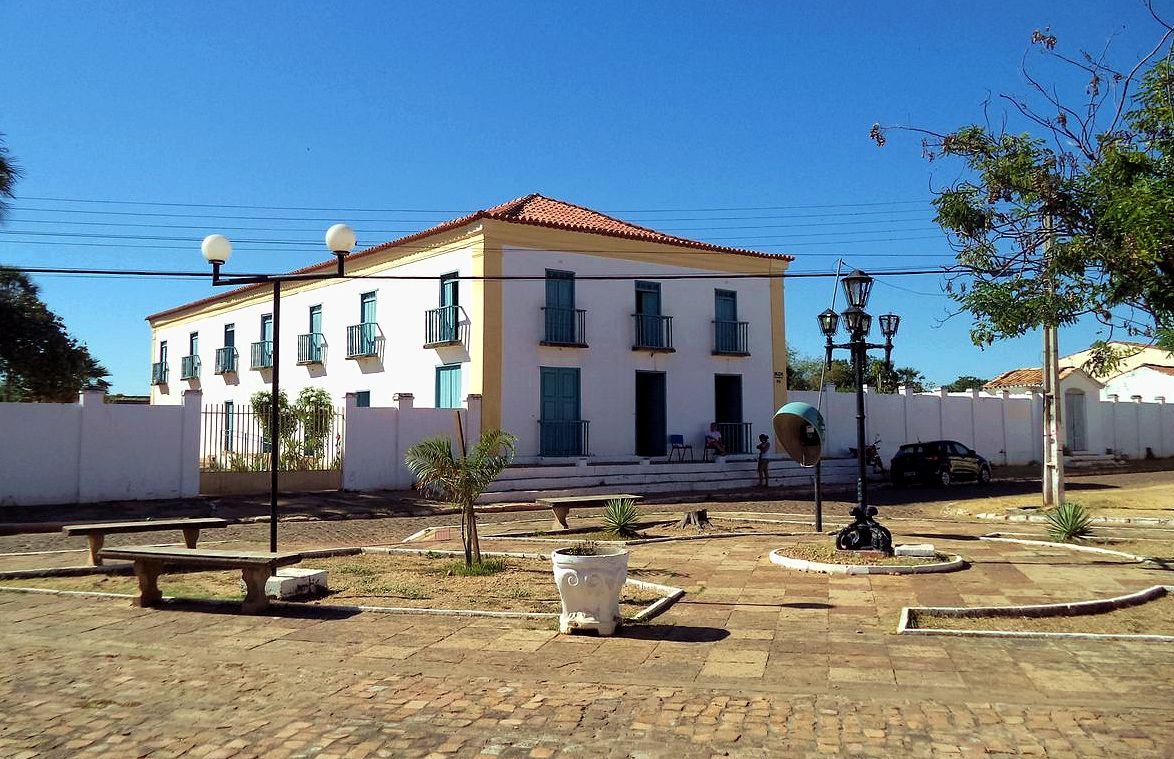
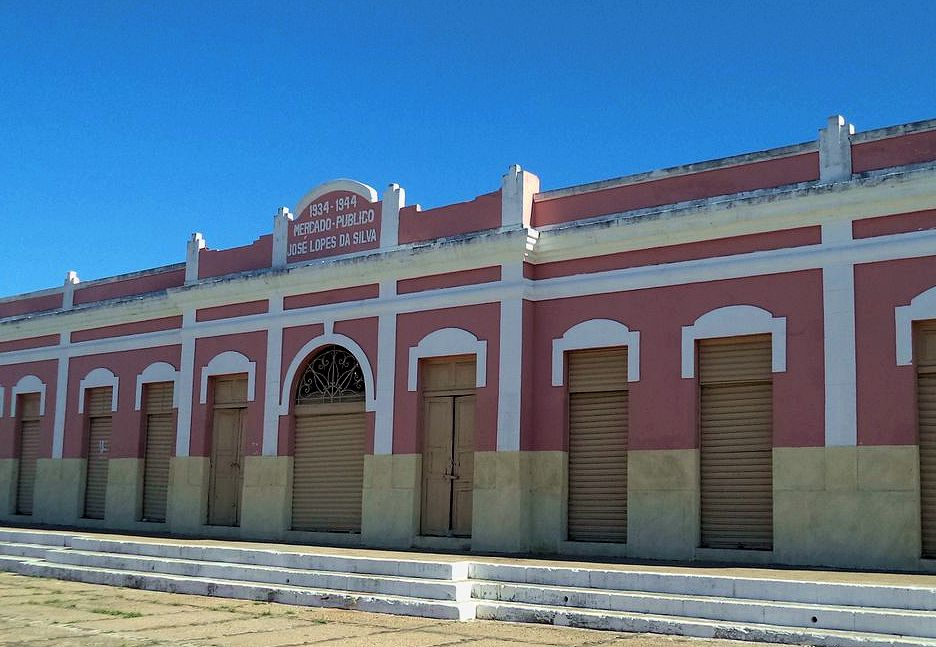
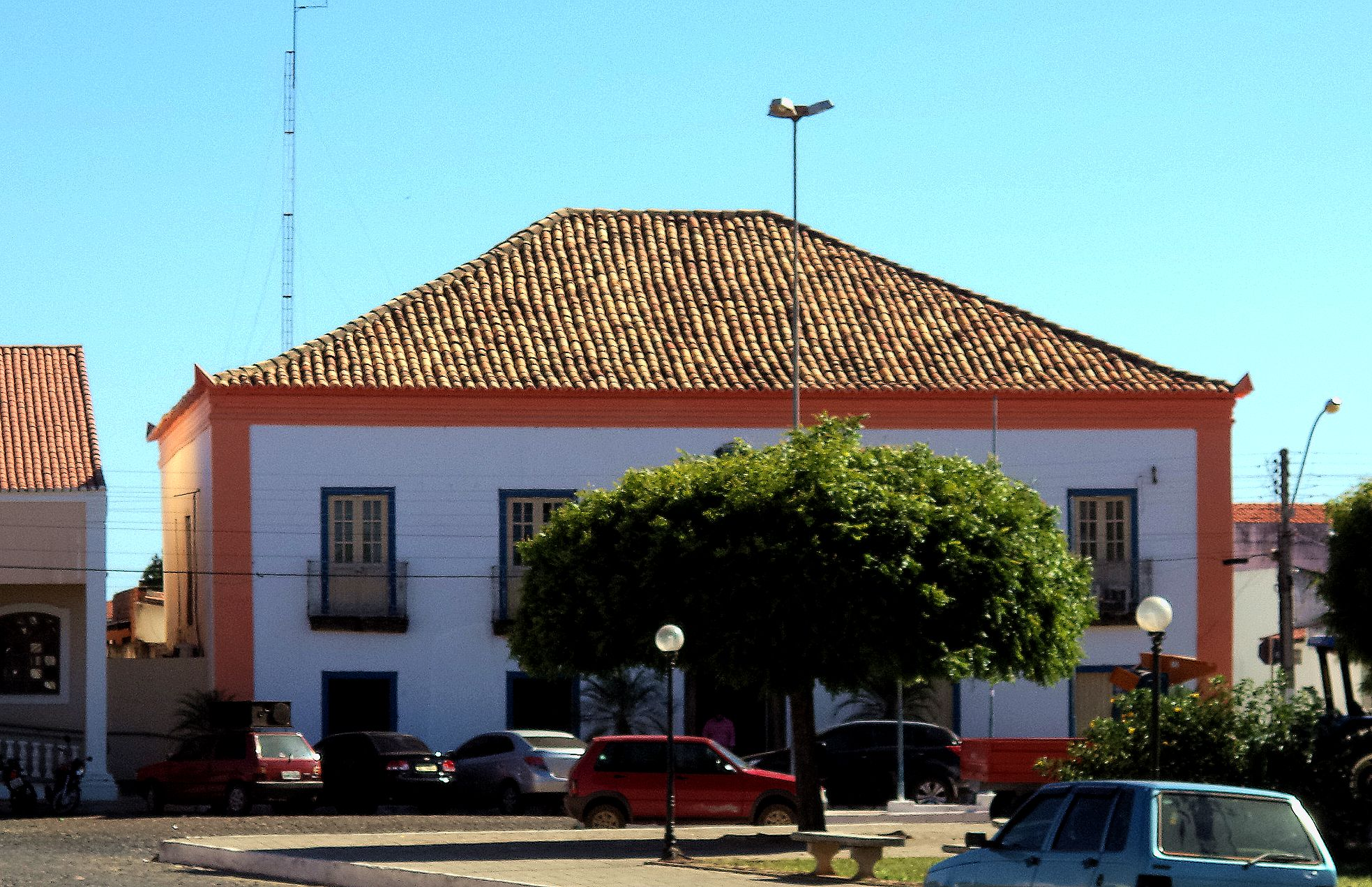
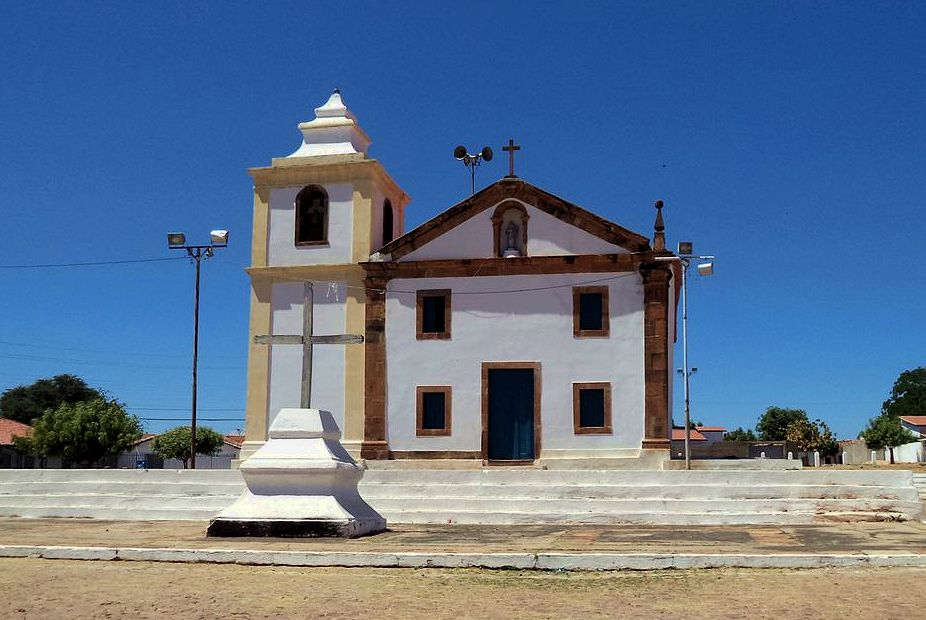
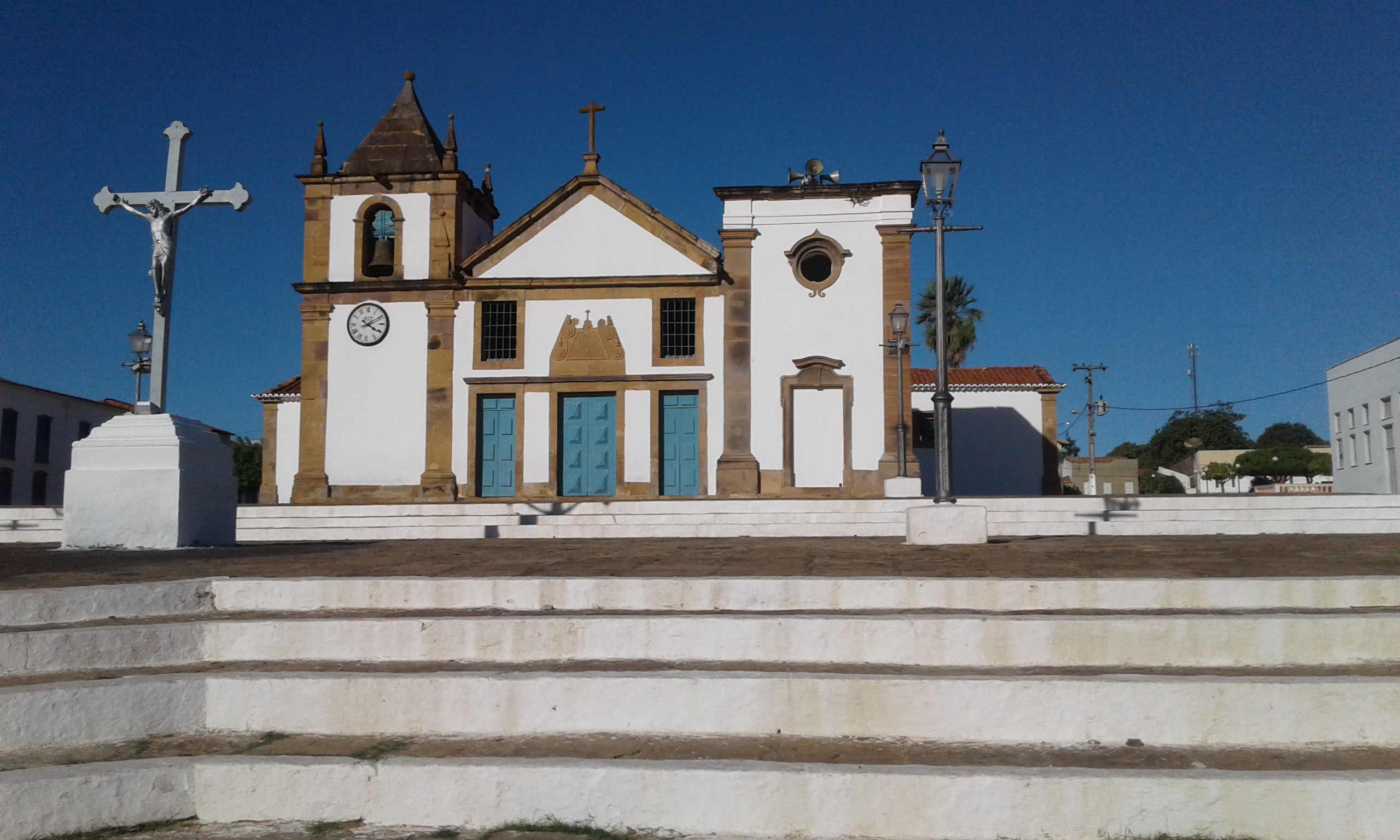
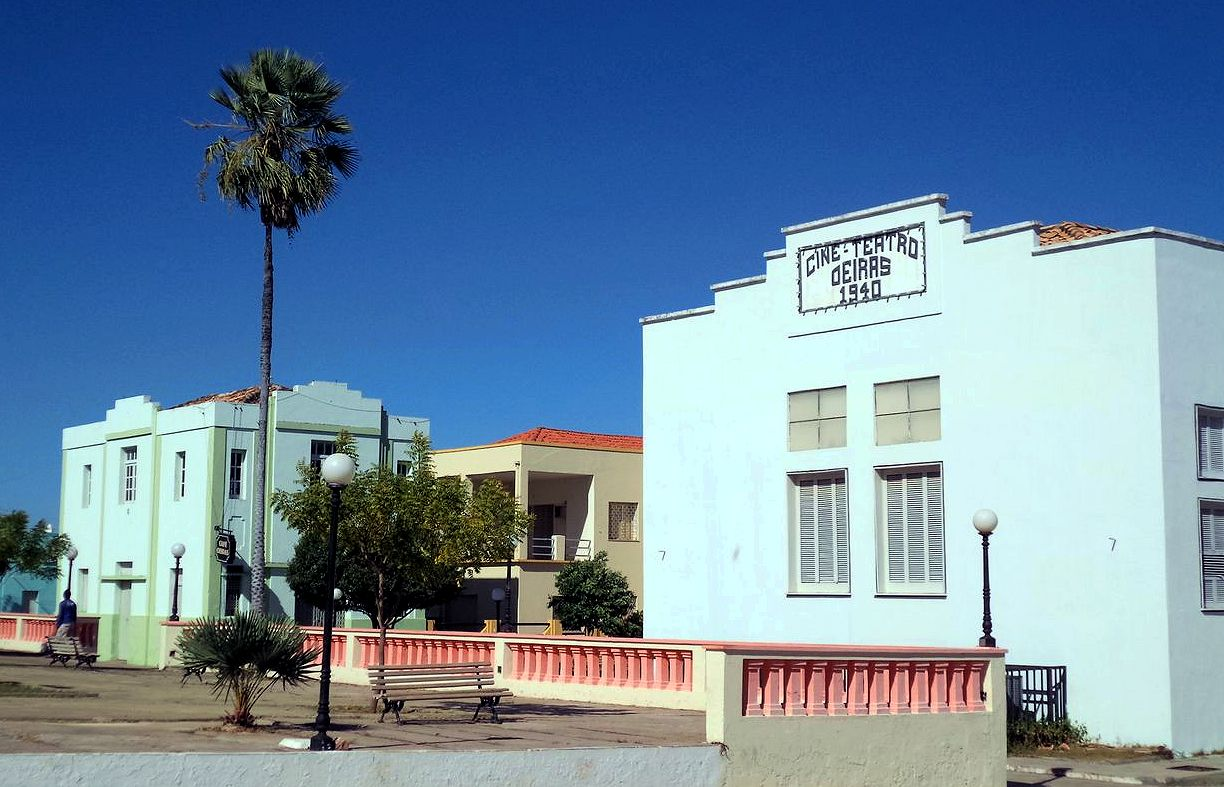

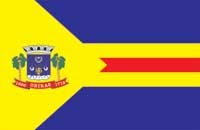
- Flag

- Location in Piauí
- Coordinates: 7°01′S 42°08′W
- Country: Brazil
- Region: Northeast
- State: Piauí

Government
  - Mayor: José Raimundo de Sá Lopes

Area
  - Total: 2,720 km^{2} (1,050 sq mi)

Population (2020)
  - Total: 37,085
  - Density: 13.6/km^{2} (35.3/sq mi)
- Time zone: UTC−3 (BRT)

Oeiras is a municipality in the Microregion of Picos, in the northeastern Brazilian State of Piauí.

According to the Instituto Brasileiro de Geografia e Estatística (Brazilian Institute of Geography and Statistics), its population was 37,085 inhabitants in 2020. The municipality covers an area of 2,720 km^{2} (1,050 sq mi). The mayor, as of 2017, was José Raimundo de Sá Lopes.

== History ==
Originally known as Vila da Mocha, due to its location on the stream Mocha, the settlement gained the recognition and status of Vila in 1712 by order of the King John V, later when the Captaincy of Piauí was created from the Captaincy of Maranhão in 1718, the settlement was designated as the capital of the newly created province.

However, the royal decree which granted political autonomy would only be followed in 1759 with the arrival of the first governor of Piauí, João Pereira Caldas, the settlement would then gain the status of city in 1761, also changing the name to Oeiras as a tribute to the Count of Oeiras, who would later be known as the Marquis of Pombal, a powerful minister in the portuguese court.

The city remained as the center of political decisions all the way to 1852, when the center of government was changed to the newly founded city of Teresina.

== Climate ==
The maximum temperature of 42.4 °C (108.3 °F) was recorded on September 25, 2023 in Oeiras, Piauí.
