= Bauru =

Brazilian municipality in São Paulo state

- Municipality
- Municipality of Bauru
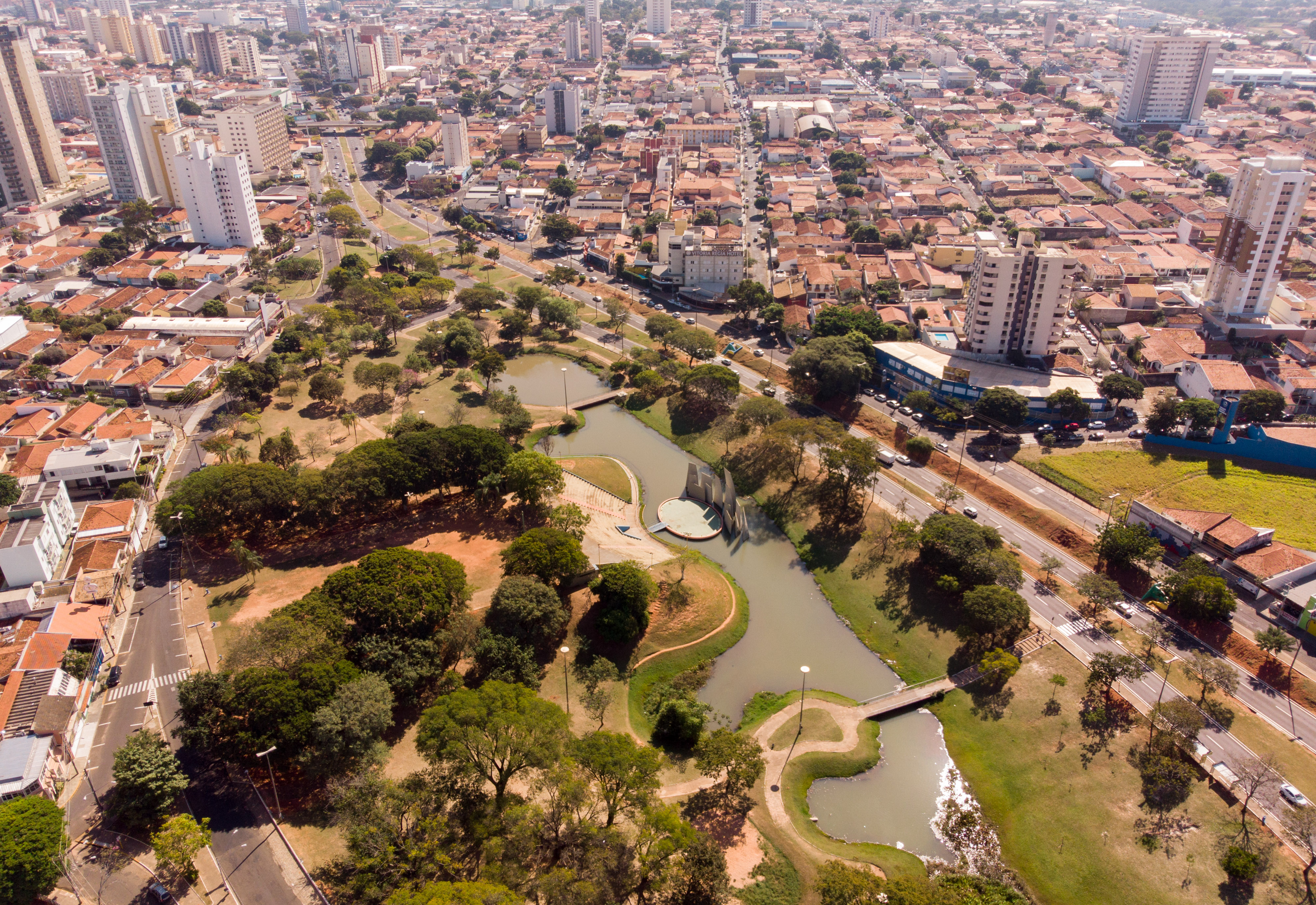
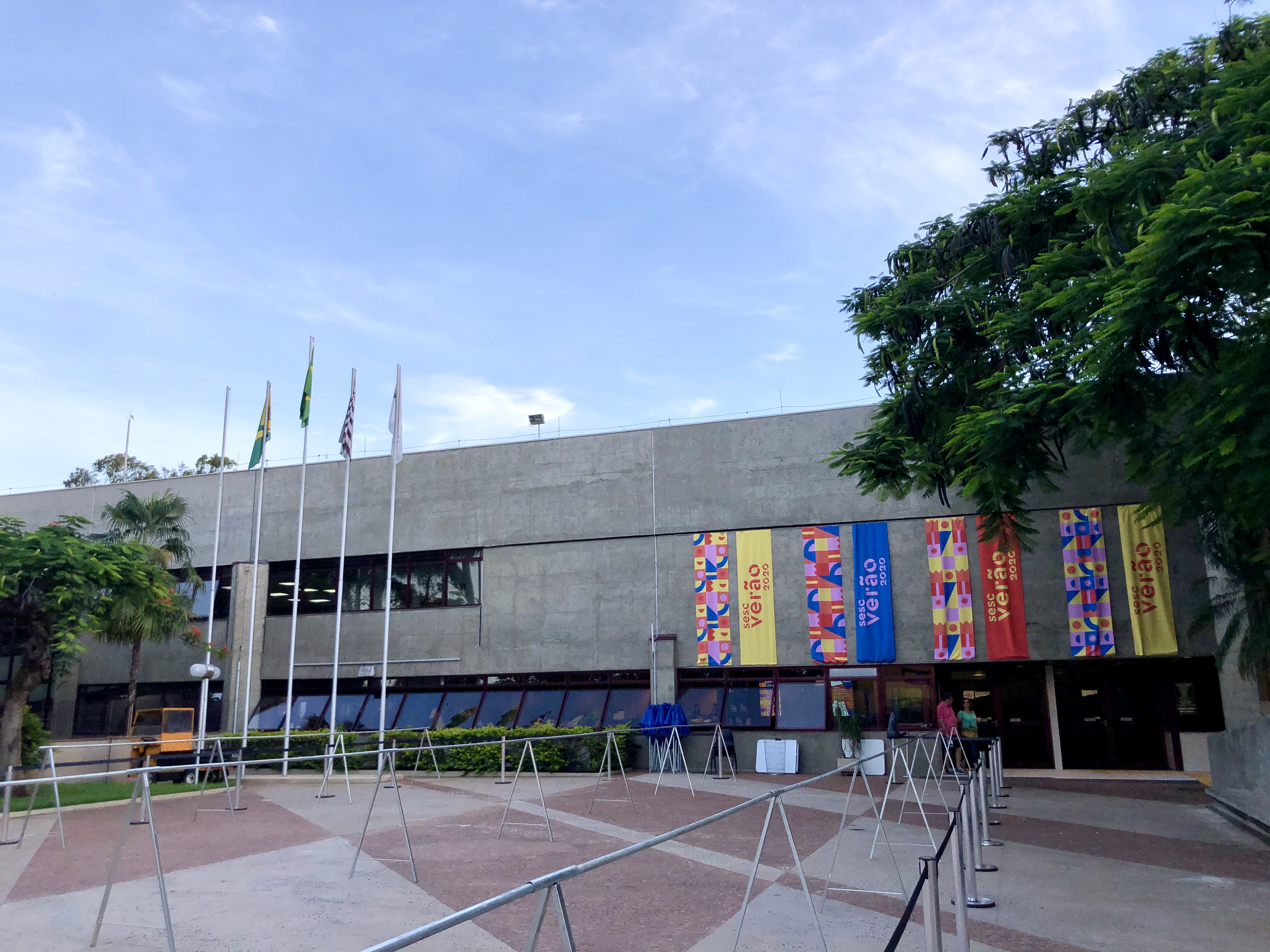
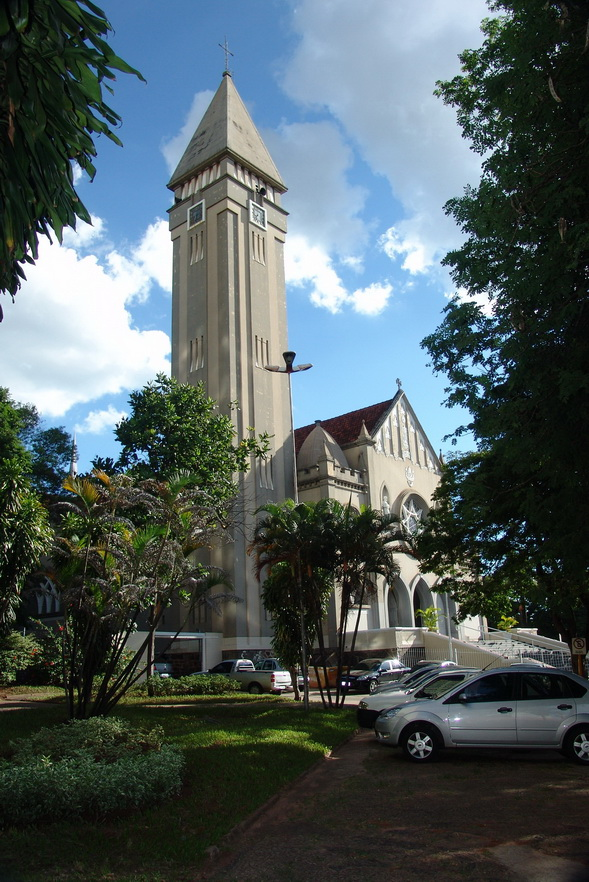
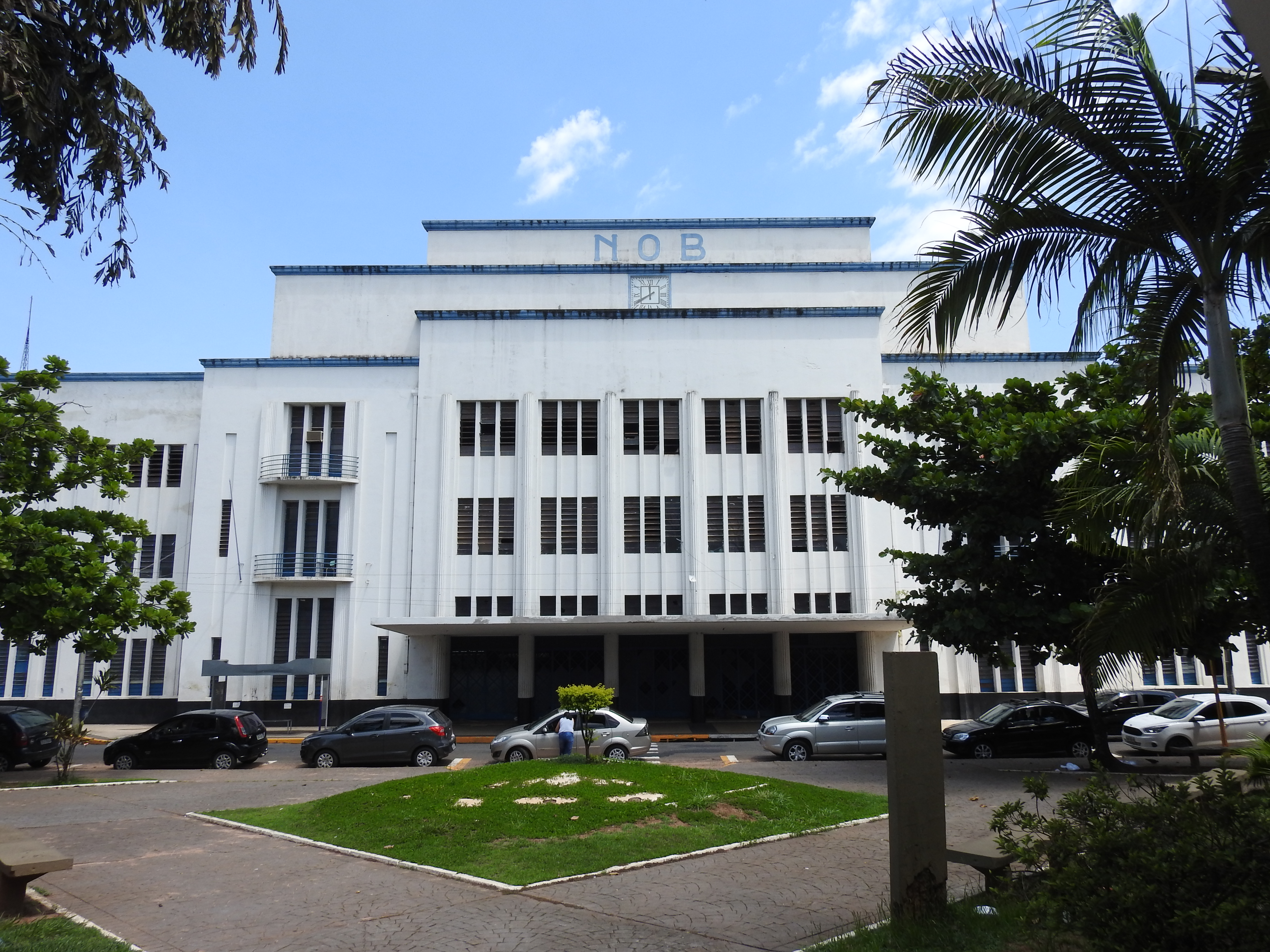
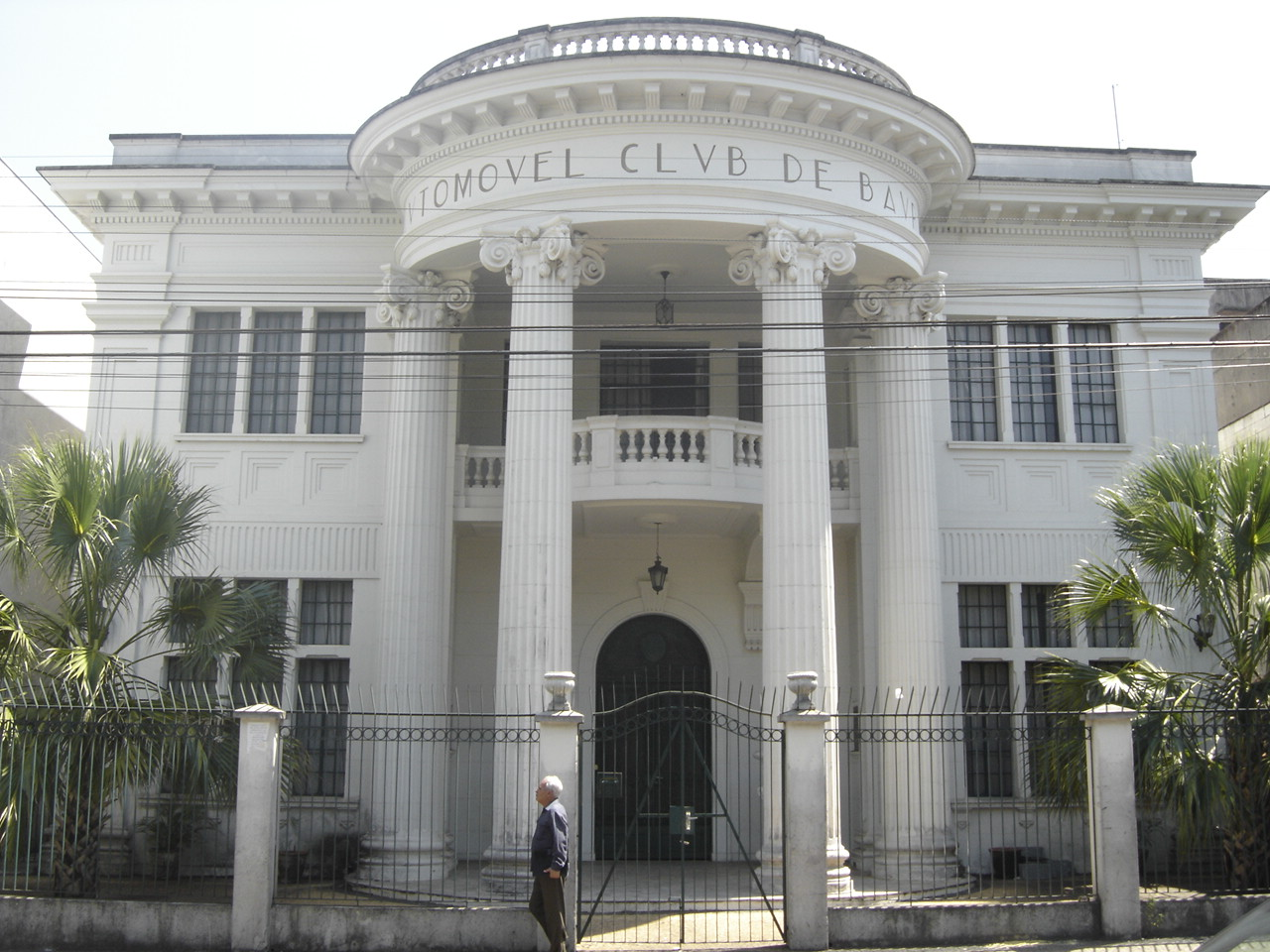
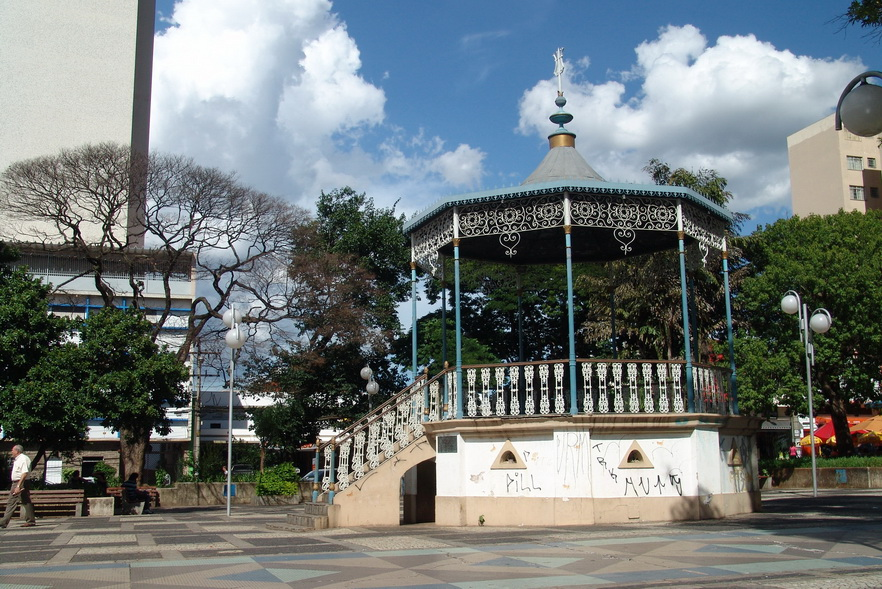
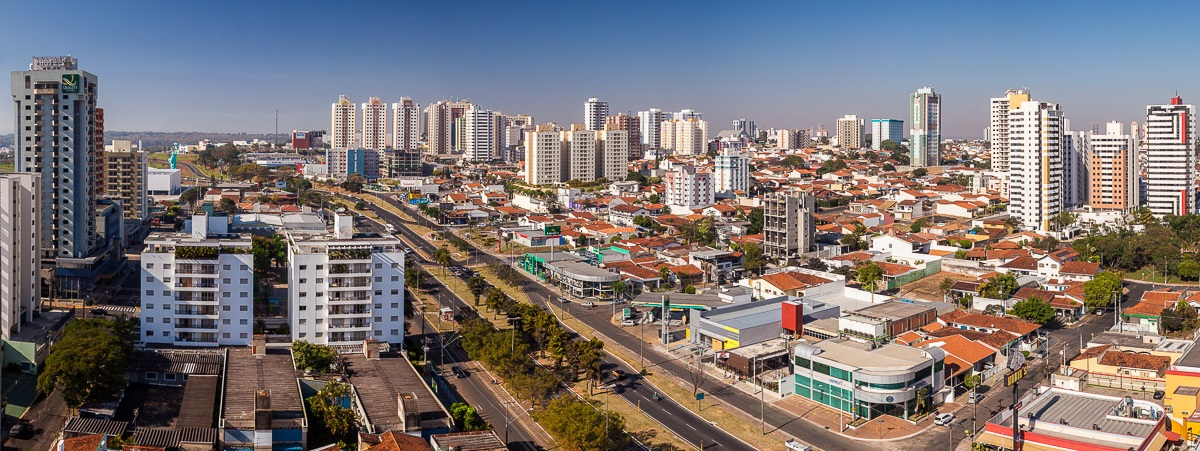
- From the top, left to right: the Vitória Régia Park; the front of SESC Bauru; the Catholic Church Santa Terezinha; The Bauru Station; the Automobile Club; Rui Barbosa Square; and a panoramic view of the city.

- Flag Coat of arms
- Motto: Custos vigilat (Latin)
- Location in São Paulo state

- Location in Brazil
- Coordinates: 22°18′54″S 49°03′39″W
- Country: Brazil
- Region: Southeast
- State: São Paulo

Government
  - Mayor: Suéllen Rosim

Area
  - Total: 667.68 km^{2} (257.79 sq mi)
- Elevation: 537 m (1,762 ft)

Population (2022)
  - Total: 379,146
  - Estimate (2025): 392,947
  - Density: 567.86/km^{2} (1,470.7/sq mi)
- Time zone: UTC-03:00 (BRT)
  - Summer (DST): UTC-02:00 (BRST)
- Postal code: 17040
- Area code: (+55) 14
- Demonym: bauruense
- HDI (2010): 0.801 – very high
- Website: www.bauru.sp.gov.br

Bauru (Note: Portuguese pronunciation: [bawˈɾu]) is a Brazilian municipality located in the interior of São Paulo state, recognized as the most populous city in the Central-West region of São Paulo. It is one of the 19 municipalities comprising the Bauru Immediate Geographic Region, which is one of four immediate regions within the Bauru Intermediate Geographic Region, encompassing a total of 48 municipalities.

Situated northwest of the state capital, Bauru is approximately 326 km away and covers an area of 667.684 km². According to the IBGE's Census of 2022, the city had an estimated population of 379,146 inhabitants, making it the 18th most populous municipality in São Paulo.

Founded in 1896, Bauru experienced significant population growth due to the March to the West, a government initiative under Getúlio Vargas to promote development and settlement in Brazil's central region. In the early 20th century, the city's infrastructure expanded with the arrival of the railway and, later, highways. Coffee cultivation became prominent in the early 1900s, but Bauru transitioned into an industrialized city, aligning with Brazil's national industrialization starting in the 1930s. Industry, alongside the service sector, is the primary source of municipal revenue, contributing to Bauru's 68th highest GDP in Brazil. Since the 1950s, sugarcane production has gained prominence in agriculture.

Several highways, including Marechal Rondon, Comandante João Ribeiro de Barros, Cesário José de Carvalho, and Engenheiro João Batista Cabral Renno, connect Bauru to various municipalities in São Paulo. The city is a critical hub for air, road, and rail transport. Beyond its economic significance, Bauru is a key cultural center in its region. The Bauru Municipal Botanical Garden and the Bauru Forest Garden are vital environmental preservation areas, while the Celina Lourdes Alves Neves Municipal Theater, the Bauru Cultural Center, and the Bauru Automobile Club are notable urban landmarks. The Municipal Culture Secretariat oversees cultural projects and events, enriching Bauru's cultural life.

== Etymology ==
One widely accepted theory regarding the origin of Bauru's name suggests it derives from mbai-yurú, meaning "waterfall" or "steep river" in the Tupi language. Alternatively, it may come from ybá-uru, translating to "basket of fruits," or "bauruz," the name given to the indigenous people living along the Batalha River. Teodoro Sampaio proposed that Bauru is a corruption of "upaú-r-u" or "upaú-r-y," referring to a "river of the lagoon," from Tupi terms "Upá" or "Upaú" (lagoon or dammed water) and "U" or "I" (flowing water or river).

== History ==
=== Early history ===
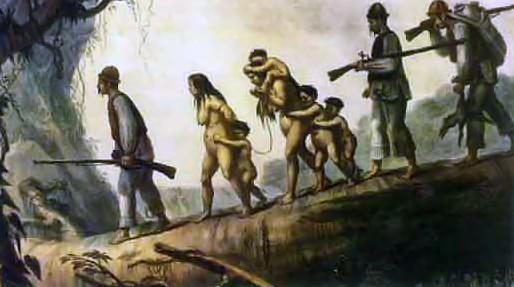
Painting depicting the Guaraní people, one of the indigenous groups vying for control of the Bauru region in the 18th century.

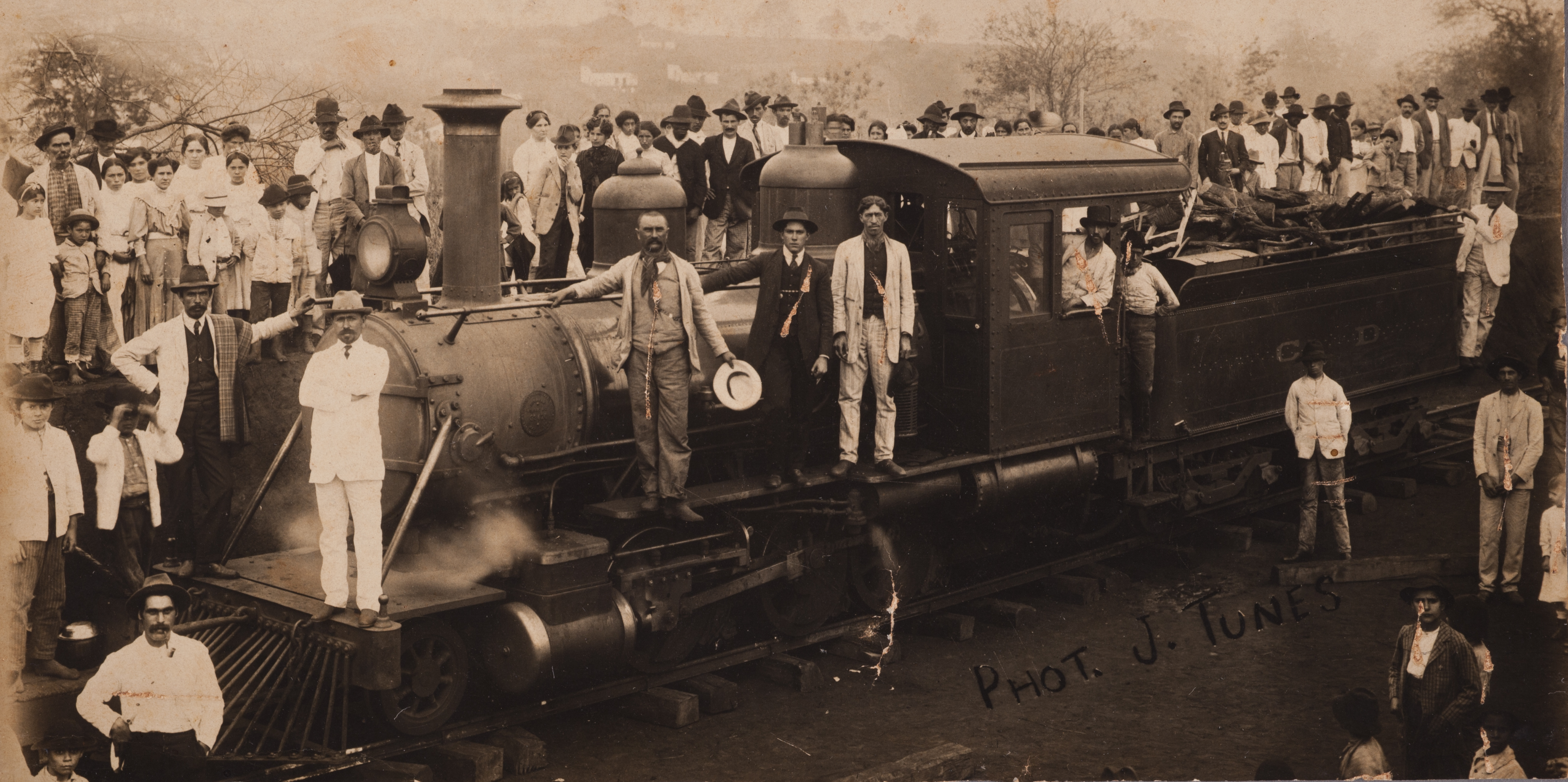
First locomotive to arrive in Bauru, September 24, 1910.

The area now occupied by Bauru was historically contested by two indigenous groups: the Kaingang and the Guarani. In the 18th century, bandeirantes attempted to settle in the region, a key crossing point for the fluvial expeditions heading to Mato Grosso and Goiás, but were repelled by attacks from local indigenous groups. Non-Indians only managed to settle in the region in the 19th century, with settlers arriving from São Paulo’s coast, Minas Gerais, and Rio de Janeiro. After 1850, pioneers from São Paulo and Minas Gerais began exploring the vast region between the Botucatu Ridge, the Tietê River, the Paranapanema River, and the Paraná River, previously inhabited by Kaingang groups.

In 1856, Felicíssimo Antônio Pereira, originally from Minas Gerais, acquired land and established the Fazenda das Flores near present-day central Bauru. In 1884, part of this estate (also known as Campos Novos de Bauru) was subdivided to form the São Sebastião do Bauru settlement. Despite Kaingang attacks and relative isolation, the district progressed and became a district of Agudos in 1888. The influx of migrants from eastern São Paulo and Minas Gerais led to Bauru's emancipation as a municipality on August 1, 1896.

Bauru was officially established as a municipality in 1896. The exploration of this region of São Paulo state occurred extensively in the last decade of the 19th century and the first decade of the 20th century. The lands west of the Botucatu Ridge, beyond the Agudos Ridge, never supported the slavery system that prevailed in much of Brazil until 1888. The municipality of Lençóis Paulista marked the geographical limit of slavery in that region of São Paulo. This factor influenced the demographic and ethnic composition of the region. Consequently, the proportion of Black and mixed-race individuals in Bauru is relatively lower than in other parts of São Paulo, while the population of Asian descent, particularly Japanese, is higher than the national average.

=== Post-Emancipation period ===
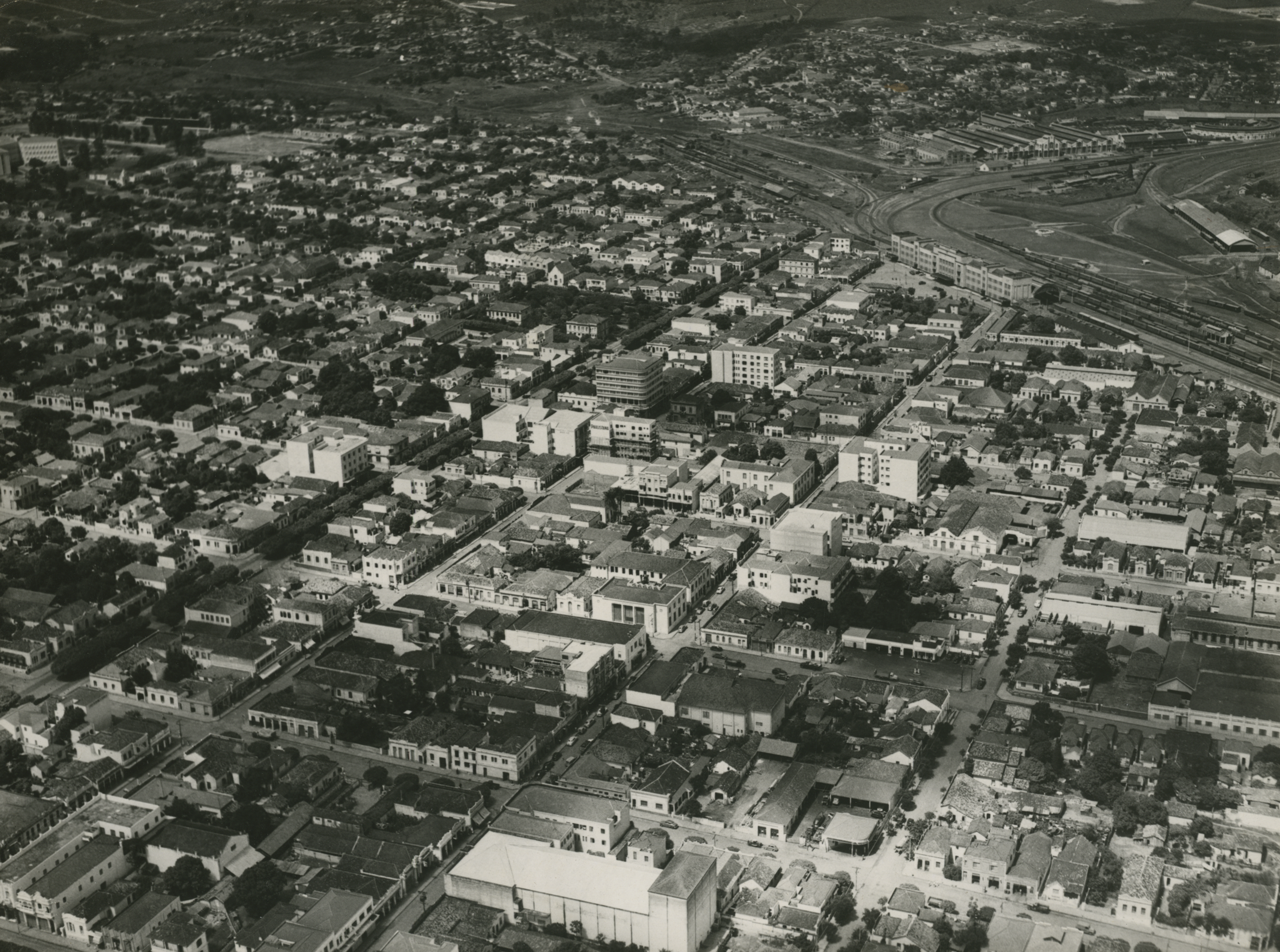
Bauru in the 1970s. National Archives.

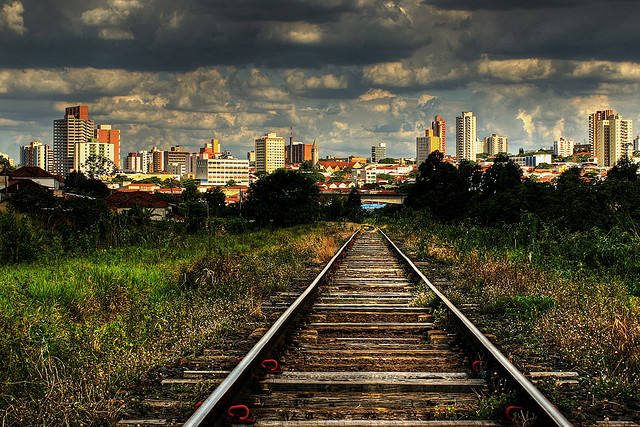
View of Bauru with the railway in the foreground. For decades, the city was a major rail hub.

Initially, the new municipality relied on coffee cultivation, despite having less fertile soil compared to other parts of the state. In 1906, Bauru was selected as the starting point for the Northwest Brazil Railway, connecting Bauru to Corumbá in Mato Grosso do Sul, near the Bolivia border. During the first half of the 20th century, Bauru emerged as the primary economic hub of a vast region encompassing Western São Paulo, Northern Paraná, and Mato Grosso do Sul. The lack of a robust industrial sector prevented significant internal migration, such as the Northeastern migration that began in the 1930s to Greater São Paulo and Eastern São Paulo. The extermination of indigenous groups, particularly the Kaingang, was a tragic episode in the region’s incorporation into São Paulo’s territory. These factors underscored the importance of foreign immigration in shaping Bauru’s current ethnic and demographic profile.

The March to the West, initiated by Getúlio Vargas’s government to encourage development and settlement in Brazil’s Central-West, attracted many settlers to this part of São Paulo. Bauru’s population growth necessitated infrastructure investments, particularly as the industrial sector developed in the 1940s and 1950s. Decree No. 5349, issued on October 18, 1904, formalized the creation of the Northwest Brazil Railway Company, with its route starting from Bauru. In July 1905, the tracks reached the municipality, extending the Sorocabana Railway. In 1906, the first newspaper, "O Bauru," was established, and in 1908, telephone services were introduced. On March 9, 1911, the Bauru Judicial District was created, and on March 16 of the same year, public lighting was installed. In 1913, the first school was established, and in 1928, the Portuguese Beneficence Society Hospital, the region’s first major hospital, was founded. On March 8, 1934, the first radio station, PRC-8 (later PRG-8) Bauru Radio Club, was launched, and on April 19, 1942, a new water supply service was inaugurated. The cultural sector flourished in the 1940s and 1950s, exemplified by the opening of the Bauru Cultural Center on March 15, 1942, and the establishment of the Official Fine Arts Salon on July 16, 1950.

Bauru is renowned for the Bauru sandwich, created by Bauru lawyer Casimiro Pinto Neto at the Ponto Chic bar in Largo do Paiçandu, São Paulo, in 1934, while he was a student at the Law School of the University of São Paulo. The sandwich later gained fame through the "Zé do Esquinão" bar, located in downtown Bauru for decades. The original Bauru sandwich recipe, as prepared in the city, consists of French bread, roast beef, tomato slices, thin cucumber pickle slices, and melted white cheese.

In the latter half of the 20th century, rail transport was gradually replaced by highway construction. The city has since recorded strong development indicators, revitalizing degraded areas and now boasts a diversified industrial park with a skilled workforce. Its strategic location offers extensive transport options, including the largest road, rail, air, and waterway hub in São Paulo, along with reliable energy and telecommunications networks.

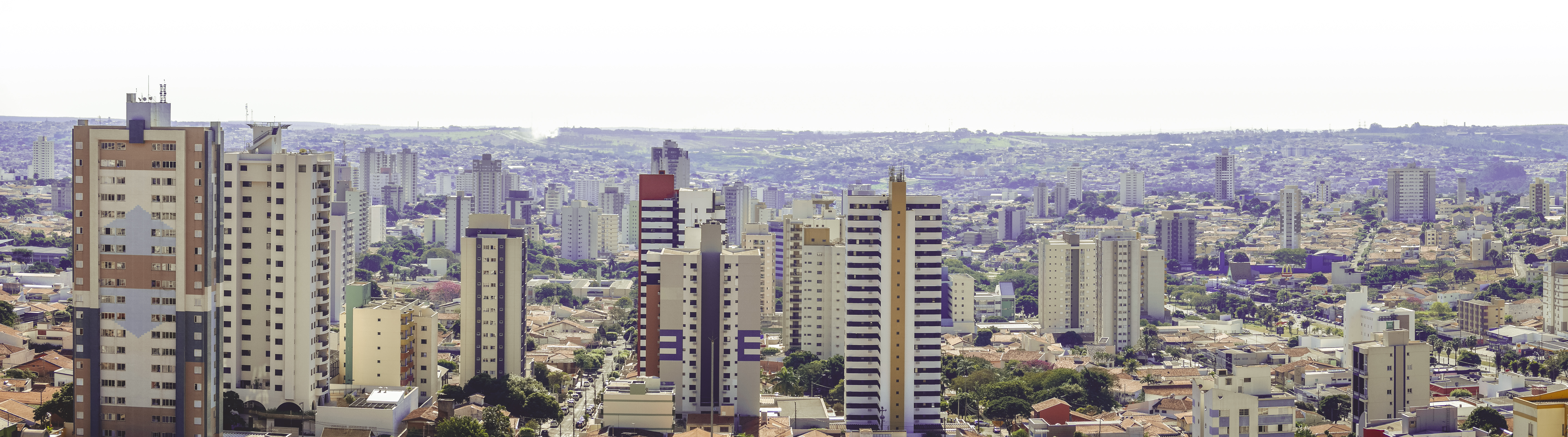
Panorama of Bauru in 2019

== Geography ==
According to the Brazilian Institute of Geography and Statistics, Bauru’s municipal area spans 667.684 km². Located at 22°18′54″ south latitude and 49°03′39″ west longitude, it is 326 kilometers northwest of the state capital. Bauru borders Reginópolis to the north, Arealva to the northeast, Pederneiras to the east, Piratininga to the south, Agudos to the southeast, and Avaí to the west.

=== Geomorphology and hydrography ===
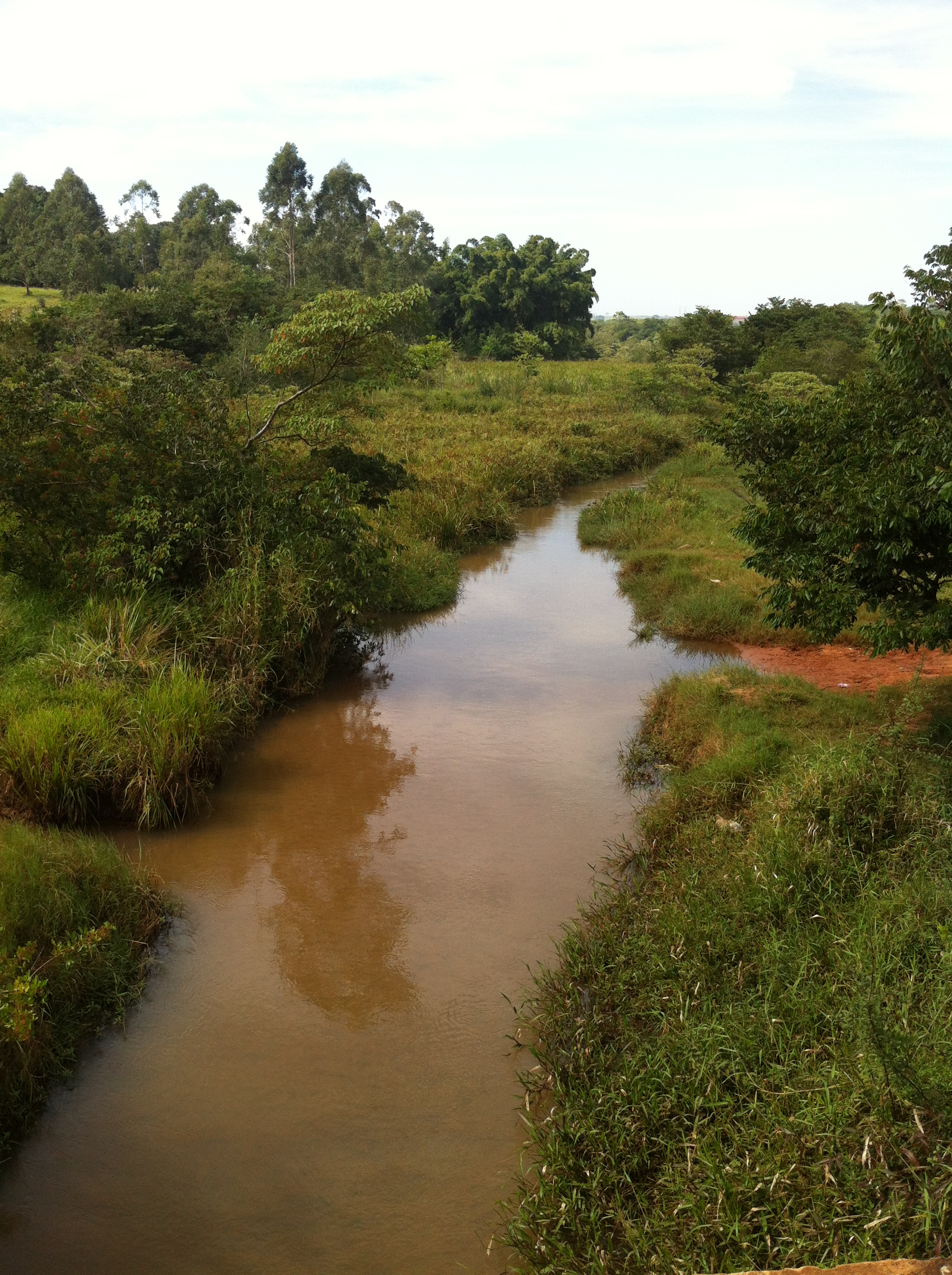
Batalha River in Bauru.

Bauru’s terrain is predominantly undulating, with 64.71% of the territory characterized by rolling hills, while flat areas account for 23.85%. The landscape is low-lying and dissected at its edges, a remnant of post-Cretaceous tropical denudation processes, with an average elevation of 526 meters.

The city’s soils are primarily sandy, with low drainage density, a characteristic of the Western São Paulo Plateau, influenced by the region’s warm climate for much of the year. Predominant soil types include red-yellow latosol, found extensively, and red-yellow acrisol, common on steeper slopes, both with medium to sandy textures. Latosol areas are prone to large gullies. These soils are developed, stable, and well-drained but lose micro-aggregates under intense irregular occupation, leading to significant erosion.

The terrain’s density directly affects drainage networks, which, in turn, can alter the surface configuration. Bauru’s main rivers are the Bauru River and the Batalha River. The Bauru River originates near the urban perimeter in the former Fazenda Fortaleza (now a subdivision in the Lagoa Sul neighborhood), flowing 42 km to join the Tietê River between Boraceia, Pederneiras, and Itapuí. The Batalha River, originating in Agudos, is a significant Tietê tributary, stretching 167 km. It supplies Bauru with water.

=== Climate ===
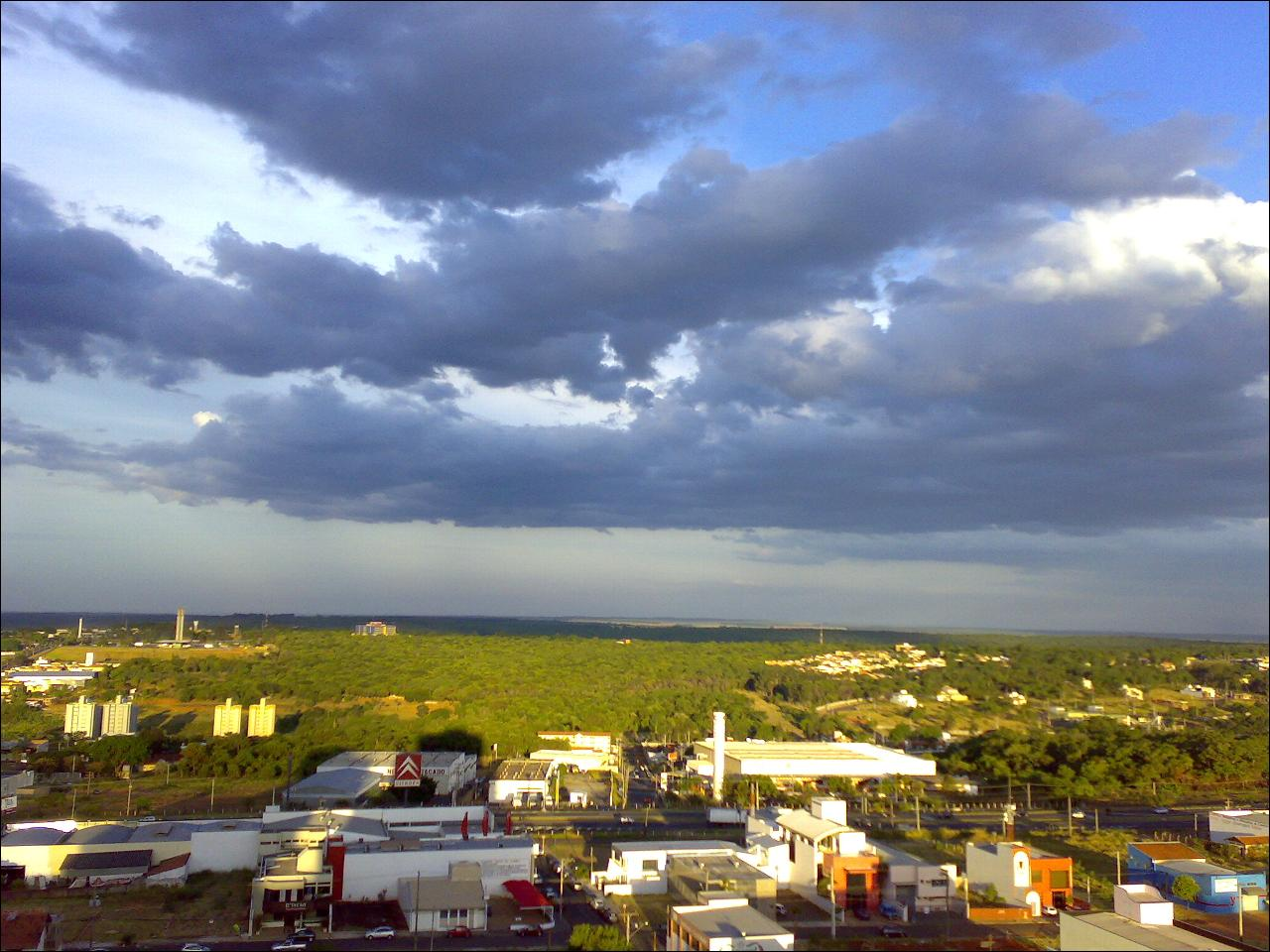
Sky over Bauru on a partly cloudy day.

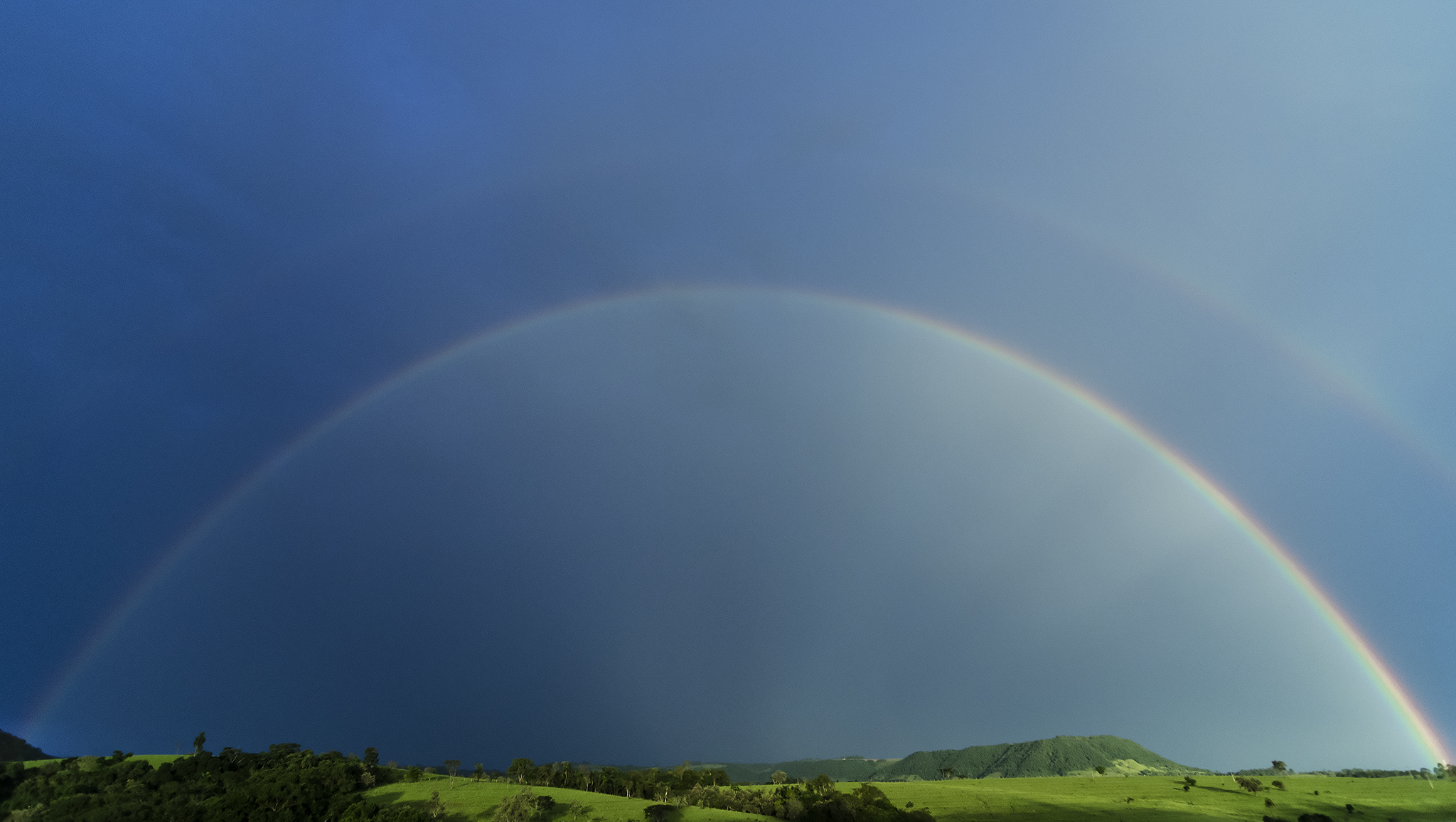
Rainbow near Bauru.

According to the Center for Meteorological and Climatic Research Applied to Agriculture (CEPAGRI) at the State University of Campinas (UNICAMP), Bauru’s climate is classified as a tropical highland climate (Aw per the Köppen climate classification), prevalent in central-western São Paulo. It features dry, mild winters and rainy, warm summers, with the warmest month’s average temperature exceeding 22°C. Autumn and spring serve as transitional seasons. The annual rainfall averages approximately 1,330 millimeters (mm), concentrated in spring and summer, with a significant decrease in winter.

During the rainy season, precipitation primarily falls as rain, occasionally accompanied by hail. These events are sometimes marked by electrical discharges, such as lightning and thunder. In winter, during the dry season, relative humidity levels often drop below 30%. This period also sees frequent wildfires in brushlands, contributing to deforestation and atmospheric pollution, which degrades air quality. Winter also brings polar air masses, some strong enough to lower temperatures to 10°C or below, occasionally causing rare frosts.

Bauru hosts the Institute of Meteorological Research (IPMet), a complementary unit of the São Paulo State University (UNESP), established in 1969 to conduct meteorological research for weather forecasting across São Paulo, as well as to quantify and monitor storms and rainfall using a weather radar.

In partnership with IPMet, the National Institute of Meteorology (INMET) installed an automatic weather station at the institute, operational since August 30, 2001. The station recorded a record low of 2.1°C on August 4, 2011. The highest temperature reached 41.6°C on October 7, 2020. The highest 24-hour precipitation accumulation was 135.4 mm on January 19, 2017. On March 1, 2018, a peak wind gust of 23.8 m/s (85.7 km/h) was recorded. The lowest relative humidity, at 9%, occurred on August 23, 2006, triggering an emergency state.

Climate data for Bauru, elevation 493 m (1,617 ft), (1995–2010 normals, extremes 2001–present)
Month	Jan	Feb	Mar	Apr	May	Jun	Jul	Aug	Sep	Oct	Nov	Dec	Year
Record high °C (°F)	37.1 (98.8)	37.1 (98.8)	35.3 (95.5)	35.7 (96.3)	32.0 (89.6)	30.2 (86.4)	32.5 (90.5)	35.5 (95.9)	40.4 (104.7)	41.6 (106.9)	37.6 (99.7)	36.9 (98.4)	41.6 (106.9)
Mean daily maximum °C (°F)	30.6 (87.1)	31.2 (88.2)	31.9 (89.4)	30.9 (87.6)	27.6 (81.7)	27.1 (80.8)	27.3 (81.1)	29.8 (85.6)	30.4 (86.7)	31.0 (87.8)	31.4 (88.5)	30.9 (87.6)	30.0 (86.0)
Daily mean °C (°F)	25.5 (77.9)	25.8 (78.4)	26.1 (79.0)	24.6 (76.3)	21.2 (70.2)	20.5 (68.9)	20.2 (68.4)	22.1 (71.8)	23.2 (73.8)	24.5 (76.1)	25.1 (77.2)	25.3 (77.5)	23.7 (74.6)
Mean daily minimum °C (°F)	20.4 (68.7)	20.5 (68.9)	20.2 (68.4)	18.3 (64.9)	14.9 (58.8)	13.9 (57.0)	13.2 (55.8)	14.5 (58.1)	16.0 (60.8)	18.0 (64.4)	18.7 (65.7)	19.6 (67.3)	17.3 (63.2)
Record low °C (°F)	12.7 (54.9)	15.4 (59.7)	13.7 (56.7)	6.9 (44.4)	6.3 (43.3)	3.0 (37.4)	2.7 (36.9)	2.1 (35.8)	4.5 (40.1)	10.1 (50.2)	10.1 (50.2)	12.5 (54.5)	2.1 (35.8)
Average precipitation mm (inches)	281.5 (11.08)	180.1 (7.09)	103.3 (4.07)	66.3 (2.61)	61.1 (2.41)	40.8 (1.61)	36.7 (1.44)	30.5 (1.20)	64.2 (2.53)	103.0 (4.06)	127.9 (5.04)	218.9 (8.62)	1,314.3 (51.76)
Average precipitation days (≥ 1.0 mm)	17.8	12.5	8.4	6.3	5.9	3.8	3.6	3.3	6.7	9.3	9.9	12.9	100.4
Source 1: Centro Integrado de Informações Agrometeorológicas
Source 2: INMET

=== Parks and environment ===
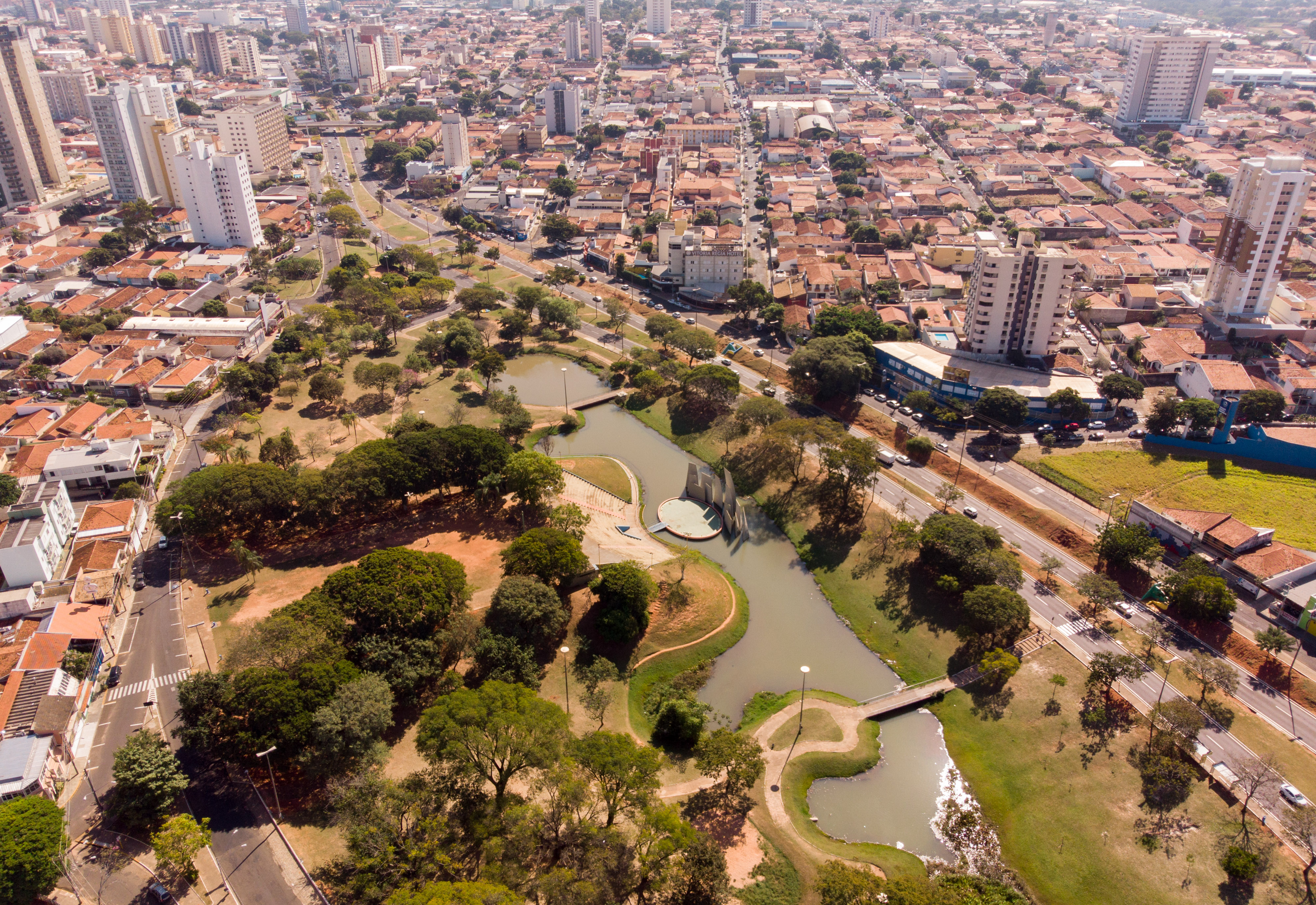
Vitória Régia Park

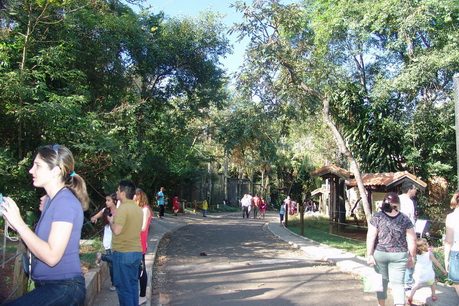
Bauru Municipal Zoo

The original and predominant vegetation in Bauru is the Atlantic Forest, but due to climatic factors and deforestation, the Cerrado biome is increasingly prevalent.

In the early 20th century, deforestation for the construction of the Northwest Brazil Railway and urban expansion led to numerous cases of leishmaniasis, as the disease-carrying mosquito migrated from forests to homes, causing an epidemic that earned the nickname "Bauru ulcer."

To curb deforestation, several conservation areas have been established. As of 2011, Bauru had nine such areas: the Community Grove (16,200 m²); the Pederneiras State Forest (1,941 hectares, established in 2002); the Bauru Ecological Station (278.7 ha, established in 1983); the Bauru Experimental Station (43.09 ha, established in 1939); the Batalha River Environmental Protection Area (APA) (established in 1998 to protect the riparian forest along the Batalha River); the Bauru Municipal Botanical Garden (established in 1994); the Vargem Alegre Municipal APA (established in 1996); the Água Parada APA (established in 1996); and the Bauru Municipal Zoo (established in 1992, covering 30 ha and housing endangered species).

Bauru also features parks, medium and large squares, sports courts, and recreational areas such as the Vitória Régia Park and Castelo Park, among others.

The Bauru Municipal Botanical Garden began construction in the 1910s at a site used for water extraction, rich in springs protected by forests. The park’s Visitor Center, opened on July 7, 2003, displays information about the park, with key attractions including ecological trails, a herbarium, and a nursery. The Bauru Forest Garden spans 50 hectares, hosting an experimental station for research on pine, eucalyptus, and other exotic and native plant species. The Bauru Municipal Zoo, inaugurated on August 24, 1980, houses various animal species and attracts approximately 150,000 visitors annually.

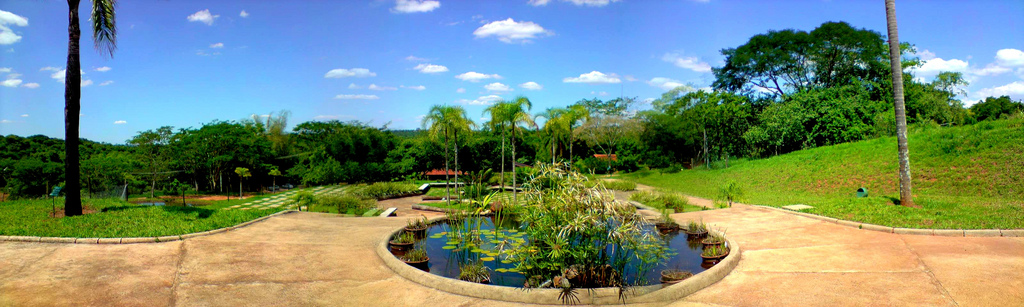
Panorama of the Bauru Botanical Garden

== Demographics ==
Historical population
Year	Pop.	±%
1970	131,936	—
1980	186,659	+41.5%
1991	261,112	+39.9%
2000	316,064	+21.0%
2010	344,039	+8.9%
2022	379,146	+10.2%
Source: Brazilian Institute of Geography and Statistics (IBGE) and National; Confederation of Municipalities (CNM)

According to the 2022 Brazilian Census, conducted by the Brazilian Institute of Geography and Statistics (IBGE), the population of Bauru was 379,146 inhabitants, with a population density of 567.85. It ranks as the 18th most populous municipality in the state and the most populous in the Mesoregion of Bauru, with a population density of 510.83 inhabitants per km².

The 2010 Brazilian Census reported that 166,692 inhabitants were male and 177,347 were female. According to the same census, 338,891 residents lived in the urban area and 5,148 in the rural area.

Bauru's Municipal Human Development Index (HDI-M) is considered very high by the United Nations Development Programme (UNDP). Its HDI-M score is 0.801, making it the 20th highest in São Paulo state (out of 645 municipalities), the 24th in the Southeast Region of Brazil (out of 1666), and the 37th in Brazil (out of 5565). Most of Bauru's indicators are very high and exceed the national average, according to the UNDP.

In 2003, the IBGE reported Bauru's Gini coefficient, which measures social inequality, as 0.43, where 1.00 represents the highest inequality and 0.00 the lowest. The incidence of poverty, as measured by the IBGE, was 14.01%, with a lower limit of 9.68%, an upper limit of 18.34%, and a subjective poverty incidence of 9.37%. From 1991 to 2010, the proportion of individuals with a per capita household income of up to half the minimum wage decreased by 16.0%. In 2010, 85.6% of the population lived above the poverty line, 9.6% were at the poverty line, and 4.7% were below it. In 2000, the richest 20% of Bauru's population accounted for 62.8% of the municipality's total income, 23 times higher than the 2.7% share of the poorest 20%. In 1991, the poorest 20% held 3.9% of the income, indicating an increase in social inequality from the early 1990s to 2000.

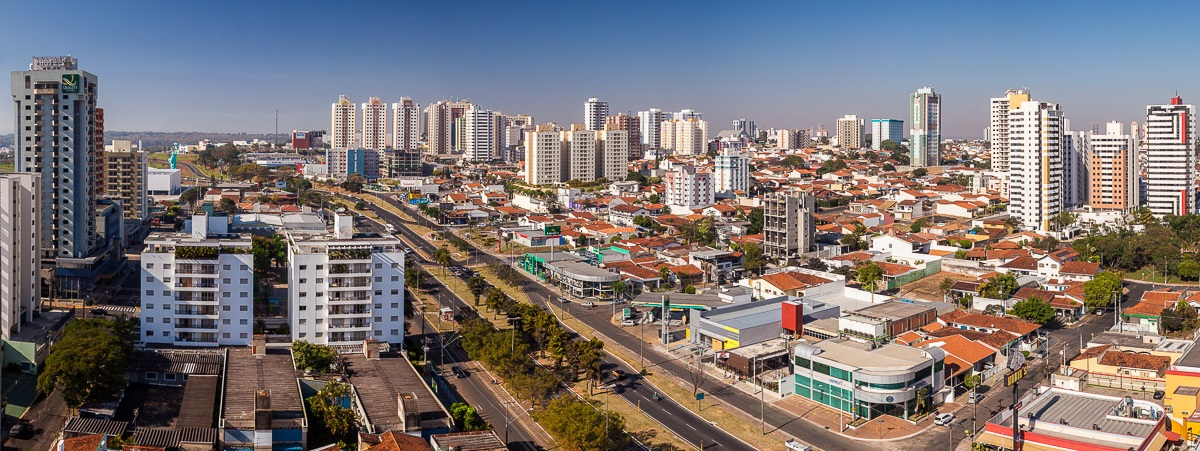
Panorama of the Nações Unidas Avenue region

=== Housing shortage ===
In 2008, according to the municipal government, there were records of slums, stilt houses, and irregular settlements. In 2000, the IBGE reported that 5,888 inhabitants lived in subnormal agglomerations. However, data from November 2008, released by the Planning Secretariat, estimated that nearly 15,000 people were living in shacks. In 2010, the IBGE identified 23 slums in Bauru (Jd. Ivone, Barreirinho, Ferradura, V. Aimorés, Sta. Teresinha, Jd. Olímpico, Jd. Nicéia, Jd. Yolanda, J. Europa, Vila Zilo, Parque das Nações, Comendador/Santista, Jd. Vitória, Cutuba, Parque Real, Jd. Andorfato, Parque Jaraguá, São Manoel, Vila Sta. Filomena, J. Gerson França, Jd. Marise, Jd. Maria Célia, and Pousada da Esperança). The first irregular housing clusters began forming in the mid-1980s, as many people migrated to Bauru seeking better living conditions and settled in subnormal agglomerations. These grew due to the absence of a housing policy or housing secretariat in Bauru. Many of these occupied areas were public lands designated for green spaces.

To address this situation and improve living conditions in the slums, the Bauru Participatory Master Plan was approved in August 2008. It provides for the regularization of slums not located in high-risk areas prone to flooding or erosion, or in environmental preservation zones, with those in such areas to be relocated. Other municipal projects aim to curb the expansion of slums. Additionally, irregular settlements—areas lacking legal land ownership—pose challenges, though many are in the process of regularization.

=== Religion ===
Reflecting Bauru's cultural diversity, the city is home to a wide range of religious manifestations. Although it developed within a predominantly Catholic social framework, influenced by both colonization and immigration—and the majority of Bauru residents still identify as Catholic—the city is now home to numerous Protestant denominations, as well as practices of Buddhism, Islam, Spiritism, and others. In recent decades, Buddhism and Eastern religions have seen significant growth in the city.

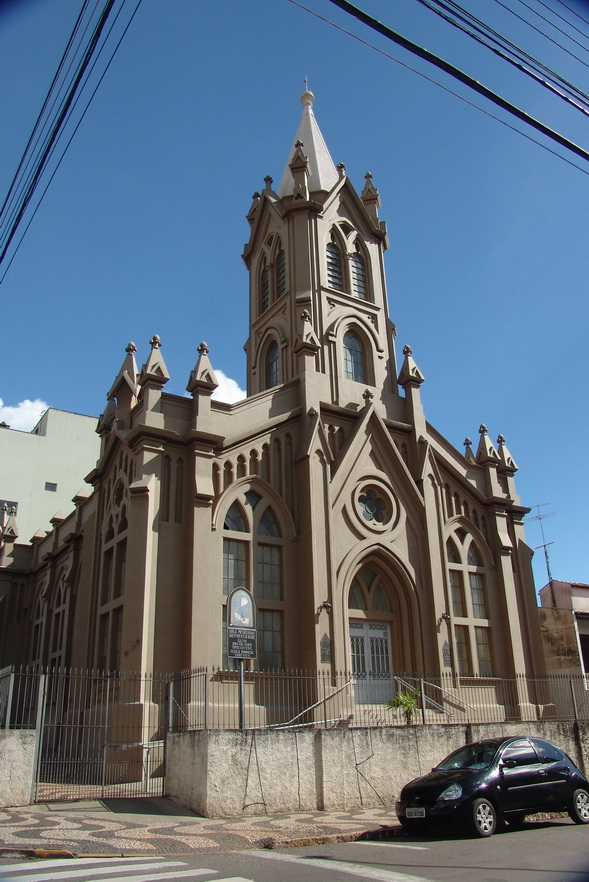
Independent Presbyterian Church

The Jewish, Mormon, and Afro-Brazilian religious communities are also significant. According to the 2000 IBGE census, Bauru's population is composed of: Catholics (62.37%), Evangelicals (23.59%), non-religious individuals (7.31%), Spiritists (3.12%), with the remainder distributed among other religions.

==== Protestant churches ====
Bauru is home to a variety of Protestant or Reformed denominations, including the Lutheran Church, Presbyterian Church, Methodist Church, Anglican Episcopal Church, and various Evangelical groups such as the Sara Nossa Terra Evangelical Community, Maranata Christian Church, Baptist churches, Assemblies of God, Seventh-day Adventist Church, World Church of God's Power, Universal Church of the Kingdom of God, and Christian Congregation in Brazil, among others.

As noted, the 2000 IBGE census indicated that 23.59% of the population was Protestant. Of this group, 16.52% belonged to Pentecostal Evangelical churches, 3.61% to mission-based Evangelical churches, 2.65% to institutionally unaffiliated Evangelical churches, and 0.81% to other Evangelical denominations.

Other Christian denominations are also present, including Jehovah's Witnesses (1.19% of the population) and members of The Church of Jesus Christ of Latter-day Saints (0.29%). The first Protestant church established in Bauru was the Presbyterian Church, with its local congregation founded on 15 October 1933.

==== Roman Catholic Apostolic Church ====
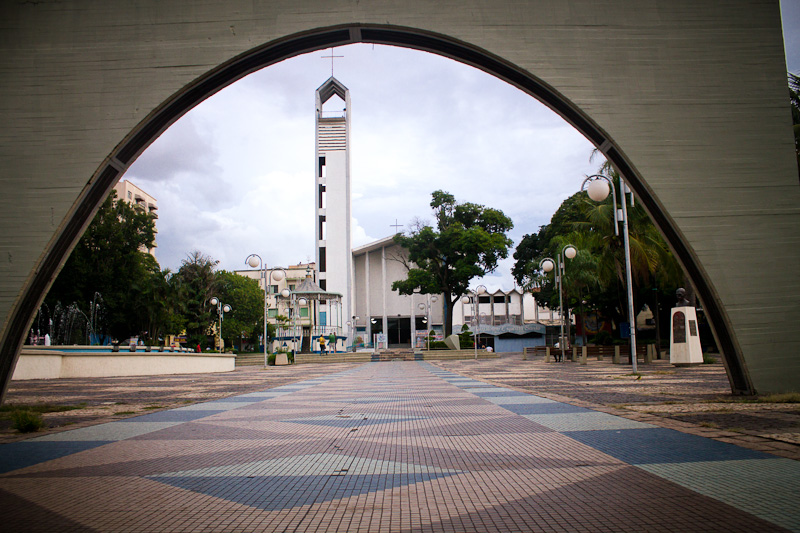
Façade of the Divine Holy Spirit Cathedral, located in Rui Barbosa Square in the city center.

According to the Catholic Church's organizational structure, Bauru is part of the Archdiocese of Botucatu, established as a diocese on 7 June 1908 and elevated on 19 April 1958. It also serves as the seat of the Diocese of Bauru, created on 15 February 1964, encompassing Bauru and twelve other municipalities. For pastoral purposes, it is divided into seven pastoral regions and 41 parishes. The seat of the Diocese of Bauru is the Divine Holy Spirit Cathedral, the city's main religious monument, inaugurated on 21 July 1897.

The establishment of the Diocese was driven by rapid population growth in the region during the early 20th century, which fostered the development of Catholicism. The "Divine Holy Spirit Chapel" was built in the late 1880s by Faustino Ribeiro da Silva, with financial support from the Municipal Council, but it was demolished in 1913. Prior to this, the first sign of religious expression in Bauru appeared around 1886, with the placement of a cross in front of the current cathedral site, in what was then the Municipal Square, renamed Rui Barbosa Square in 1923.

=== Ethnic composition ===
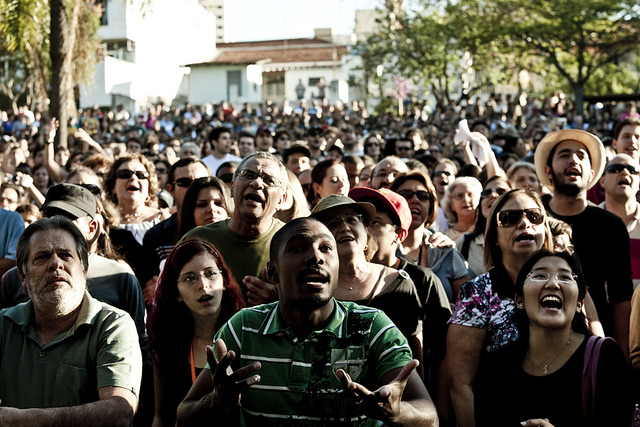
Sample of Bauru's population during a cultural event in 2010.

In 2010, according to IBGE census data, Bauru's population was composed of 243,028 Whites (70.66%), 17,041 Blacks (4.95%), 78,039 Pardos (22.69%), 5,394 Asians (1.57%), and 435 Indigenous individuals (0.13%). In 2010, there were 1,070 immigrants from other parts of São Paulo state and Brazil, according to the IBGE. The city received a significant influx of people from other parts of the country during the March to the West, many of whom settled in the region hoping for better living conditions. Conversely, 1,070 individuals left Bauru for other countries, with 345 (32.45%) going to Japan, 217 (20.28%) to the United States, and 63 (5.89%) to the United Kingdom.

Immigration was more common in the early 20th century, contributing significantly to agriculture. Many immigrants sought employment, particularly in coffee plantations, and helped strengthen commerce. Bauru welcomed waves of immigrants from various parts of the world, notably Italians, Spaniards, Portuguese, and Japanese. Its strategic location at a major road and rail junction, connecting the municipality to much of the country and other South American nations, also attracted Syrian, Lebanese, German, French, Chinese, and Jewish immigrants of various nationalities. More recently, the city has received Bolivians, Argentines, Chileans, Palestinians, and North Americans, making it one of the most cosmopolitan municipalities in the Interior of São Paulo.

== Politics and administration ==
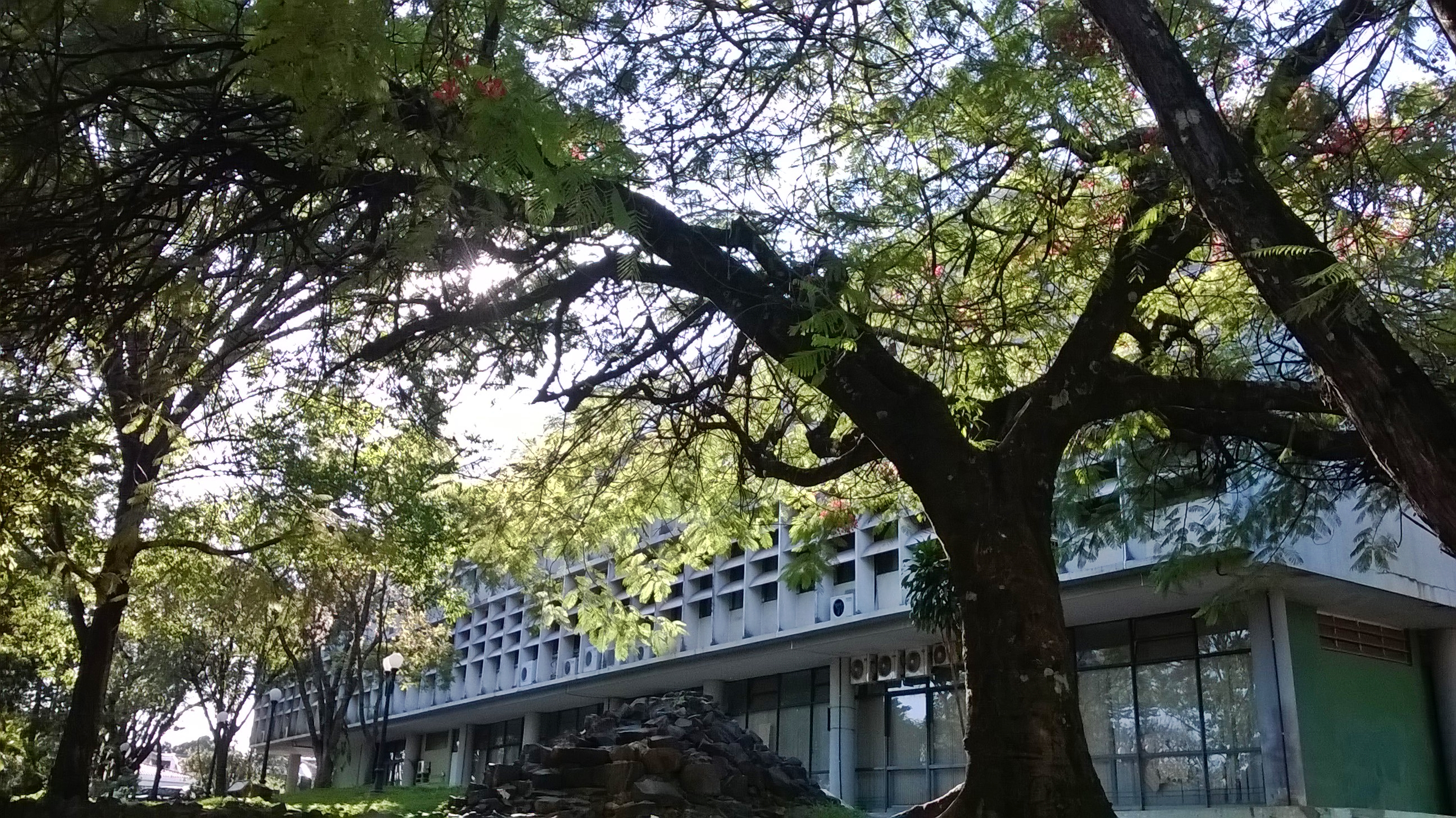
Cherry Blossom Palace, the seat of the Bauru City Hall

Municipal administration in Bauru is carried out through the executive branch and the legislative branch. The first person to govern the municipality was José Alves de Lima, who served as intendant from January to May 1896. The current mayor is Suéllen Silva Rosim of the Social Democratic Party (PSD). She won the 2020 mayoral election in the second round with 89,725 votes (at the time representing the Patriota party), securing 55.98% of the valid votes. In the 2024 mayoral election, Suéllen Rosim was re-elected as mayor. She became the first woman to be elected mayor of Bauru.

The legislative branch is represented by the Municipal Chamber, which consists of 17 councilors elected to four-year terms, in accordance with Article 29 of the Constitution. The chamber’s composition is as follows: two seats for the Social Liberal Party (PSL); two seats for Democrats (DEM); two seats for the Progressive Party (PP); two seats for the Brazilian Democratic Movement (PMDB); one seat for Republicans (REP); one seat for the Brazilian Labour Party (PTB); one seat for the Democratic Labour Party (PDT); one seat for Citizenship; one seat for the Workers' Party (PT); one seat for the Social Democratic Party (PSD); one seat for the Brazilian Social Democracy Party (PSDB); one seat for Patriota (PATRI); and one seat for Podemos (PODE). The chamber is responsible for drafting and voting on fundamental laws for the administration and the executive, particularly the participatory budget (Budget Guidelines Law).

The municipality is governed by an organic law, enacted on 5 April 1990 and effective from the same date. Bauru is also the seat of the Comarca of Bauru, established on 22 December 1910 by Law No. 1232. In April 2012, there were 246,842 registered voters, representing 0.799% of the total for the state of São Paulo. Bauru has a sister city relationship with Tenri, Japan. The city is divided into approximately 350 neighborhoods and ten regional administrations. It comprises two districts: the Seat District and Tibiriçá, which had a population of 1,492 in 2000, according to the IBGE.

Due to its central geographic location within the state of São Paulo, there have been proposals to permanently relocate the state government’s seat to Bauru. This move would aim to alleviate infrastructure pressures on the city of São Paulo and its metropolitan region while centralizing regional governance, similar to the transfer of the federal capital from Rio de Janeiro to Brasília.

== Economy ==
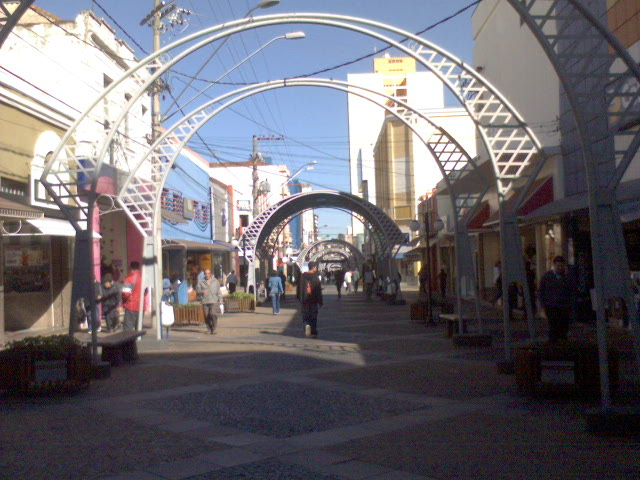
Sidewalk on Batista de Carvalho Street in the commercial center.

Bauru’s Gross Domestic Product (GDP) is the largest in the Bauru Microregion, the 18th largest in the state of São Paulo, and the 68th largest in Brazil. According to 2009 IBGE data, the municipality’s GDP was R$6,795,517,000. Of this, R$747,297,000 consisted of taxes on products net of subsidies at current prices. The per capita GDP was R$18,906.42.

According to the IBGE, in 2010, the city had 14,233 local units and 13,613 active commercial enterprises and establishments. A total of 131,698 workers were employed, with 114,667 classified as salaried employees. Salaries and other remunerations amounted to R$2,082,034,000, and the average monthly salary in the municipality was 2.9 minimum wages.

Until the 1940s, Bauru’s economy was heavily dependent on agriculture. However, its strategic location at a major road, air, water, and rail junction in São Paulo, combined with access to electricity and telephone networks, enabled the growth of industry and commerce throughout the 20th century, particularly in the second half.

=== Primary sector ===
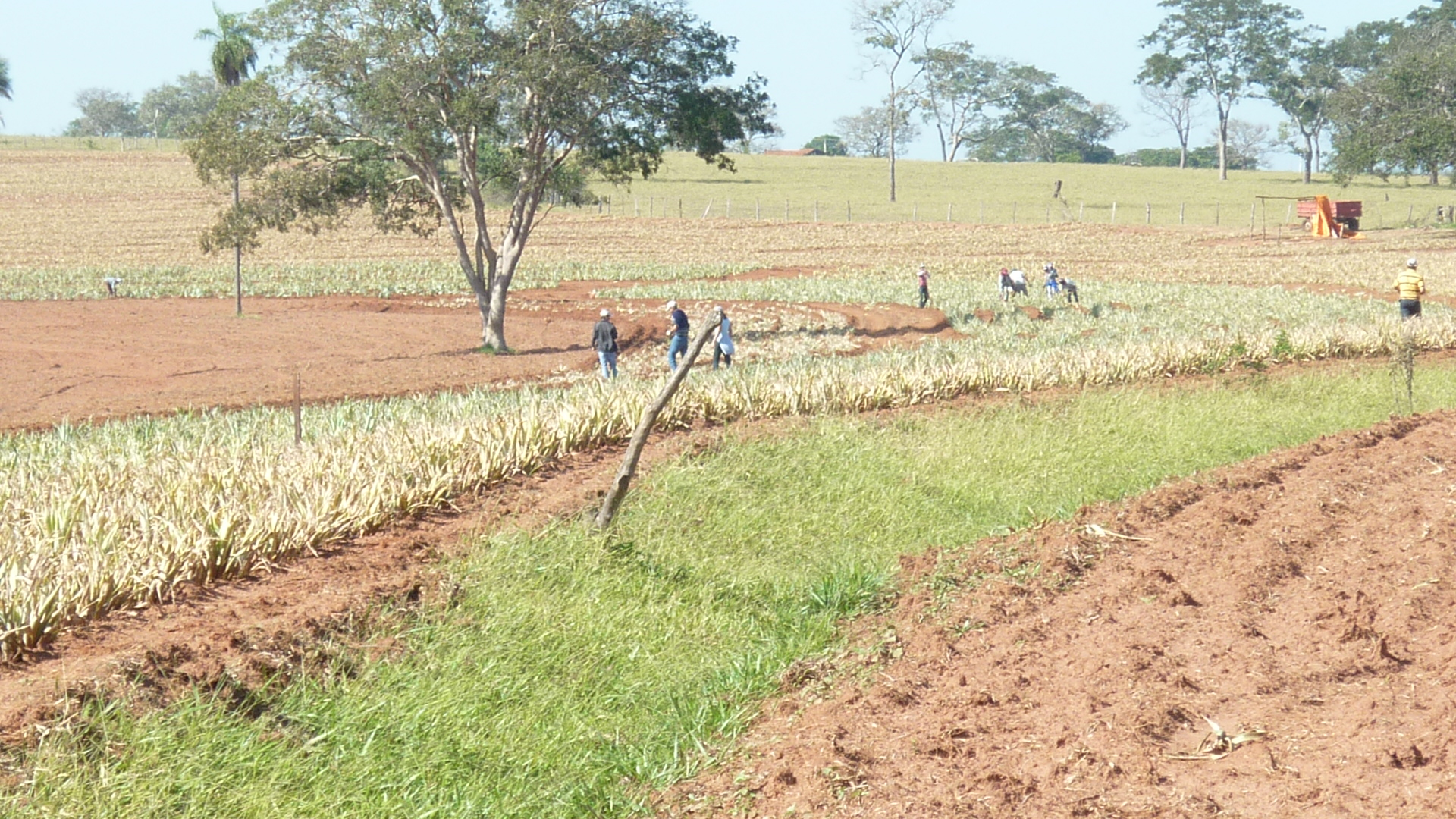
Pineapple plantation in Bauru.

Agriculture is the least significant sector of Bauru’s economy. Of the city’s total GDP, R$18,069,000 is the gross added value of agriculture. According to the IBGE, in 2010, the municipality had approximately 52,740 cattle, 1,912 horses, 244 buffalo, 20 donkeys, 45 mules, 11,058 pigs, 180 goats, and 2,893 sheep. There were 249,180 poultry, including 245,500 roosters, pullets, chickens, and chicks, and 3,680 hens, producing 102,000 dozen chicken eggs. A total of 915 cows were milked, yielding 1,263,000 liters of milk. Additionally, 26,500 kg of honey was extracted. In temporary crops, the main products are sugarcane (430 hectares cultivated and 37,883 tons harvested in 2010), pineapple (220 hectares cultivated and 3,520,000 fruits harvested), and sweet potato (75 hectares and 1,200 tons harvested).

Agriculture was a dominant economic activity in Bauru at the beginning of the 20th century, with significant contributions from immigrants. At that time, coffee cultivation was the primary economic driver, largely due to the labor of European immigrants. However, following the 1929 economic crisis, coffee production declined and was replaced by cotton cultivation. Over time, agriculture’s importance in Bauru and western São Paulo diminished, exacerbated by rural exodus as people sought better living conditions in urban areas. In rural areas, cotton was gradually replaced by sugarcane.

=== Secondary sector ===
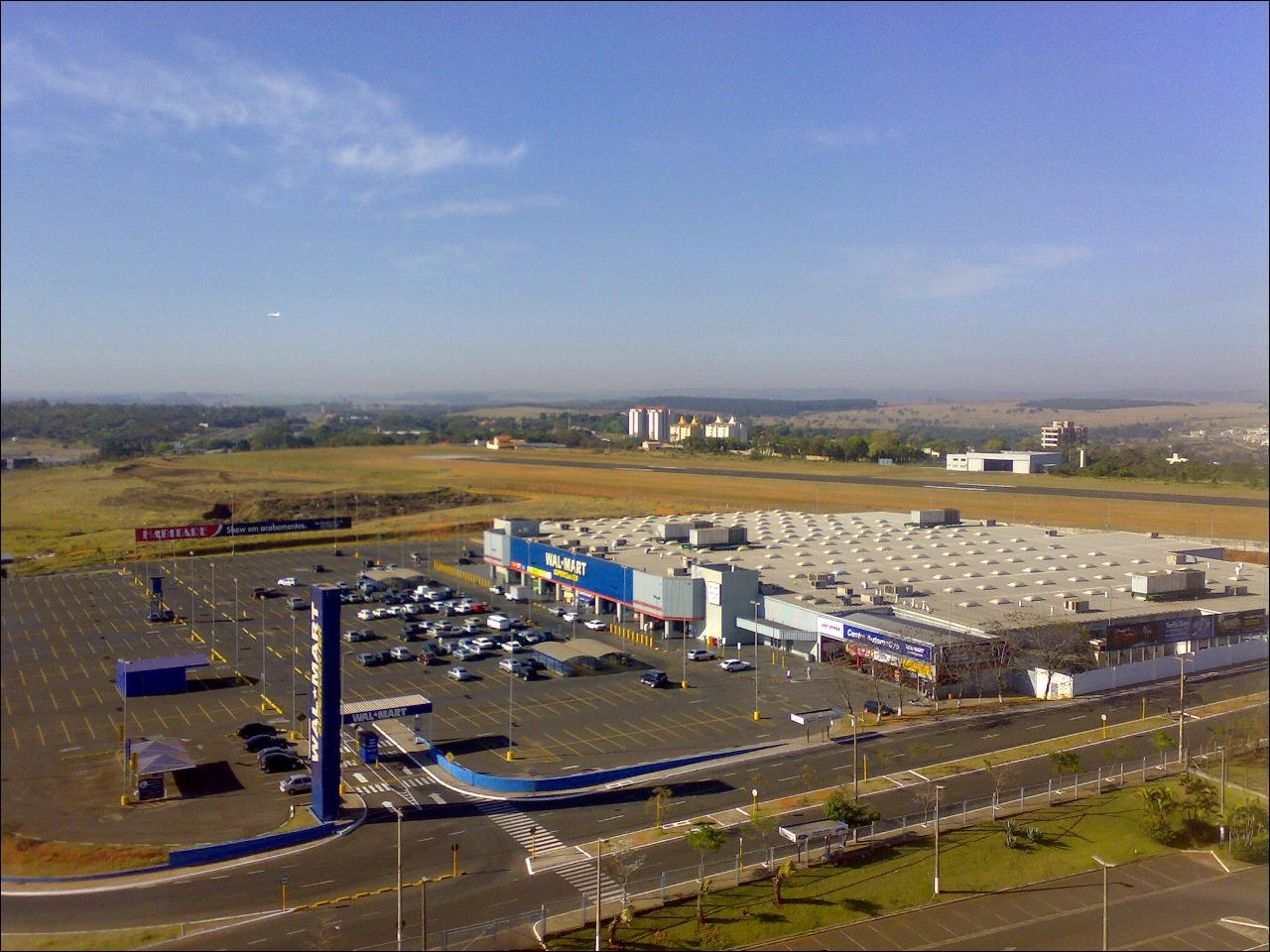
Walmart in Bauru.

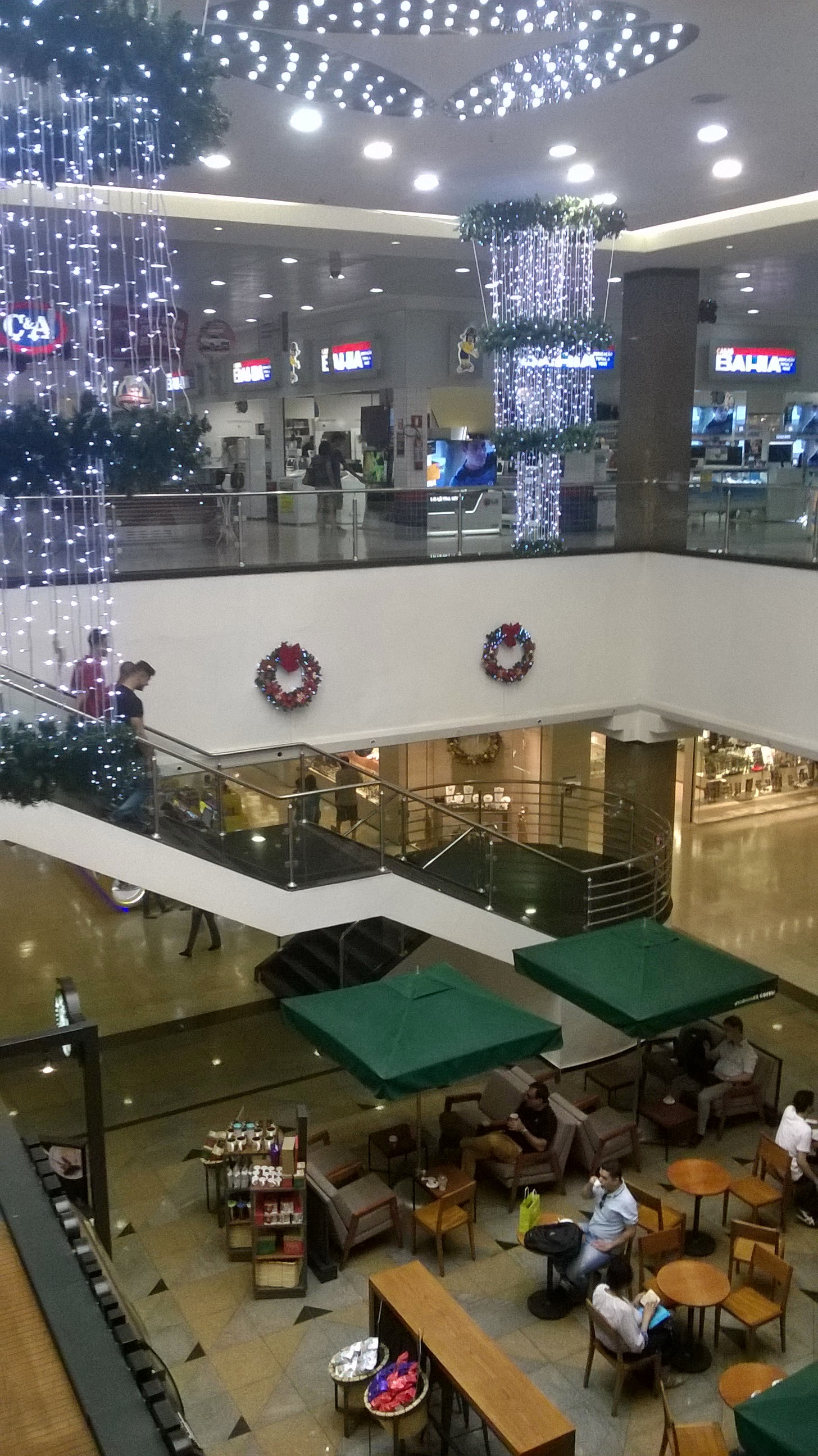
Bauru Shopping Mall

The industry is currently the second most significant sector of Bauru’s economy, contributing R$1,208,787,000 to the municipal GDP.

Key industries in the municipality include metalworking, publishing and printing, food processing, electronics, and plastics, employing over 20,000 workers directly in factories and industries.

Bauru produces automotive batteries, plastics, continuous forms, packaging, food products (such as candies and chewing gum), and clothing. It is also a major exporter of meat derivatives and a national leader in the production of school notebooks. The city has three industrial districts, hosting over 130 companies in the industrial, service, and wholesale trade sectors.

Industry played a pivotal role in Bauru’s urbanization, attracting significant populations from rural areas seeking better living conditions and income opportunities. Migrants came not only from Bauru’s rural zones but also from various small municipalities in the Interior of São Paulo.

Effective planning also supported the industrial sector’s growth. Strict environmental controls ensured that factory expansion had minimal adverse environmental impacts. The São Paulo State Industries Center (Ciesp/Regional Bauru) coordinates the productive and service sectors, addressing institutional and macroeconomic issues.

=== Tertiary sector ===
The service sector generates R$4,821,365,000 of the municipal GDP, making it the largest contributor to Bauru’s economy. In addition to commerce, the higher education sector is notable, with several higher education institutions, both public and private, establishing campuses in the city.

The development of transportation infrastructure, starting in the 1910s with the formation of a road-rail junction, made services and commerce the dominant economic activities in Bauru. Immigrants played a significant role in the growth of this sector. On 2 April 1931, the Bauru Commercial and Industrial Association was established to coordinate the commercial sector.

Commercial activity is concentrated in Bauru’s central region and its shopping malls.

== Infrastructure ==
=== Health ===
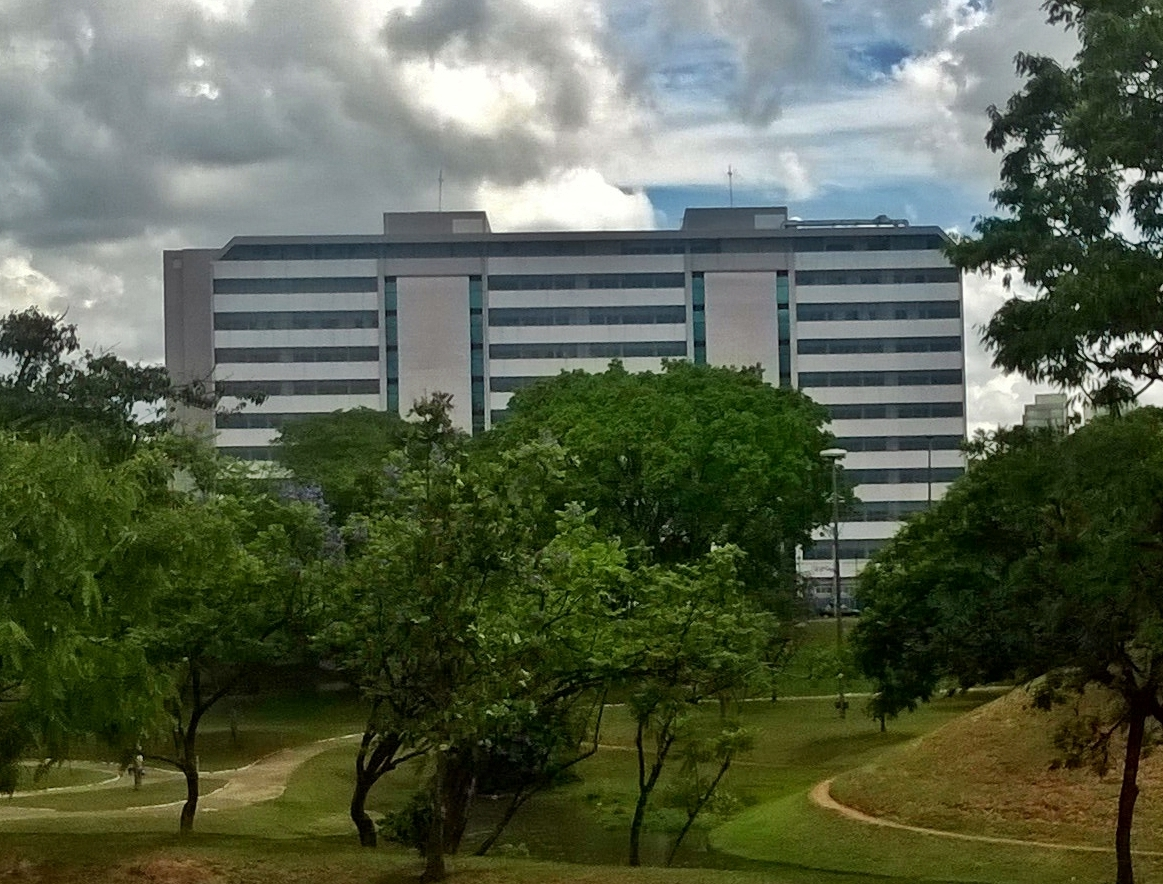
Hospital for Rehabilitation of Craniofacial Anomalies at the University of São Paulo in Bauru, known as "Centrinho"

In 2009, Bauru had 149 healthcare facilities, including hospitals, emergency rooms, health posts, and dental services, with 49 public and 100 private establishments. These facilities provided 1,046 hospitalization beds, with 465 in public facilities and 581 in private ones. In 2011, 98.5% of children under one year old were up to date with their vaccinations. In 2010, there were 4,429 births, with an infant mortality rate of 11.3 per 1,000 children under one year old. Additionally, 99.7% of live births were attended by qualified health professionals. In the same year, 14.1% of pregnant women were under 20 years old. A total of 11,817 children were weighed by the Family Health Program, with 0.1% classified as malnourished.

The Bauru Municipal Health Department, directly linked to the City Hall, is responsible for maintaining and operating the Unified Health System (SUS) and developing policies, programs, and projects to promote municipal health. For emergencies, the city has four Urgent Care Units (in the Bela Vista, Mary Dota, Ipiranga, and Geisel/Redentor neighborhoods), the Mobile Emergency Care Service (SAMU), the Central Emergency Department, and the Pediatric Emergency Service. Support services include the Municipal Mental Health Outpatient Clinic, the Human Milk Bank, Psychosocial Care Centers, the Zoonosis Control Center, and the Municipal Elderly Care Program (PROMAI). Primary care services include the Family Health Program (PSF) with six care units and 17 Basic Health Units (UBS).

Dental clinics are also set up in municipal and state schools, conducting hygiene campaigns and consultations for children. The Lauro de Souza Lima Institute (ILSL), established in 1933, is located in Bauru and is a national and international reference center for general dermatology and, in particular, leprosy. In addition to dermatology services, the institute conducts research, teaching, physical rehabilitation, occupational therapy, physiotherapy, and corrective plastic surgeries.

=== Education ===
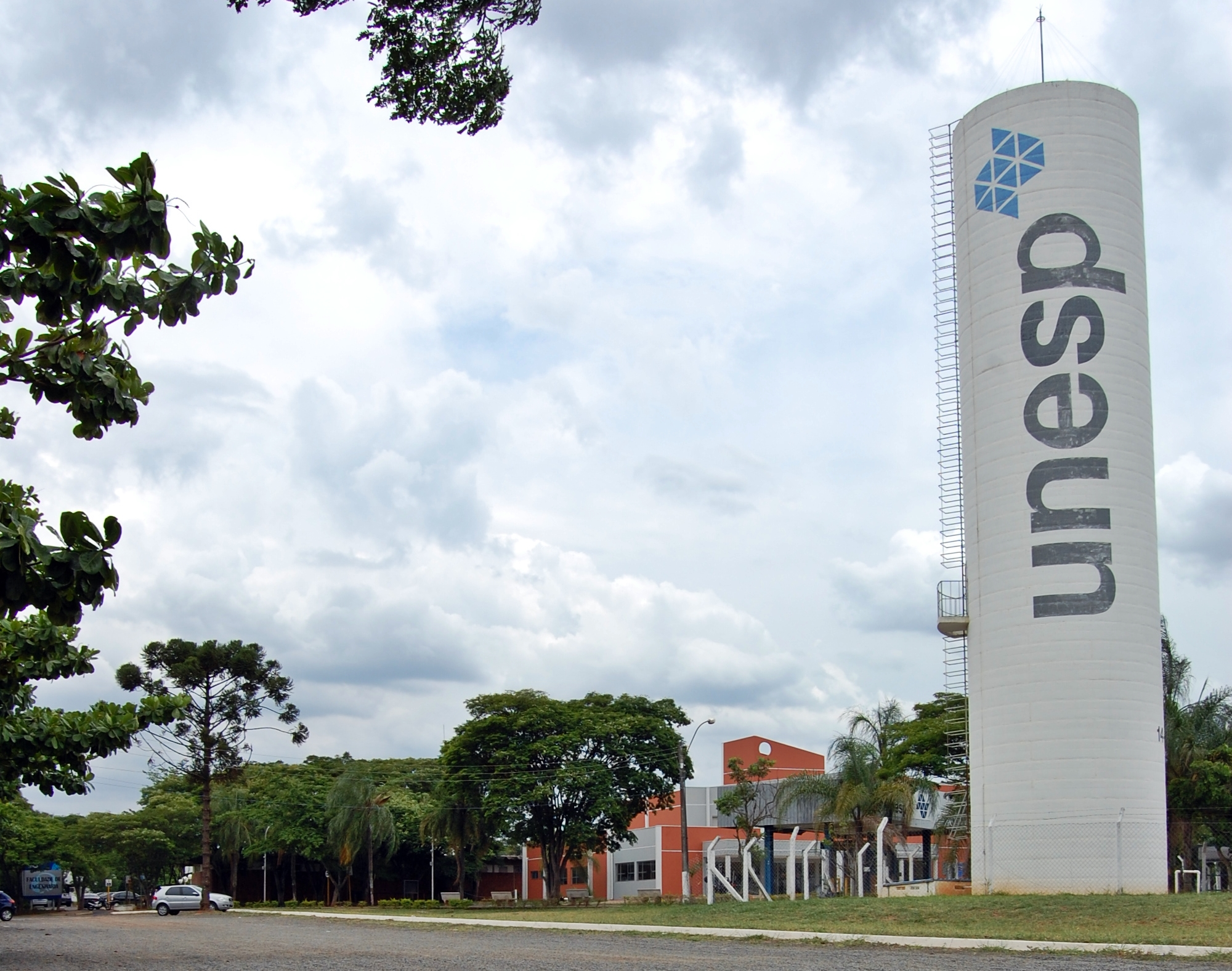
São Paulo State University

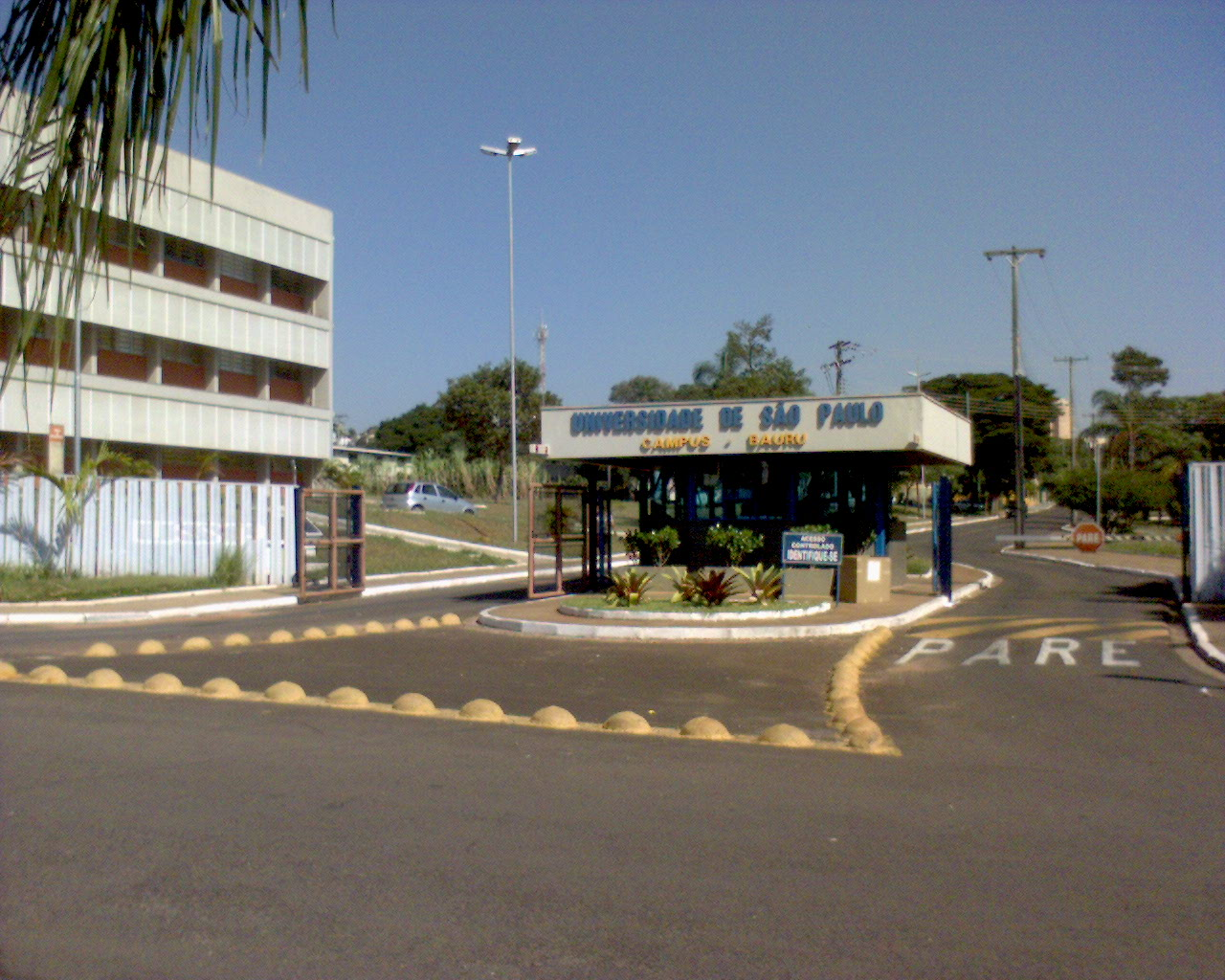
University of São Paulo

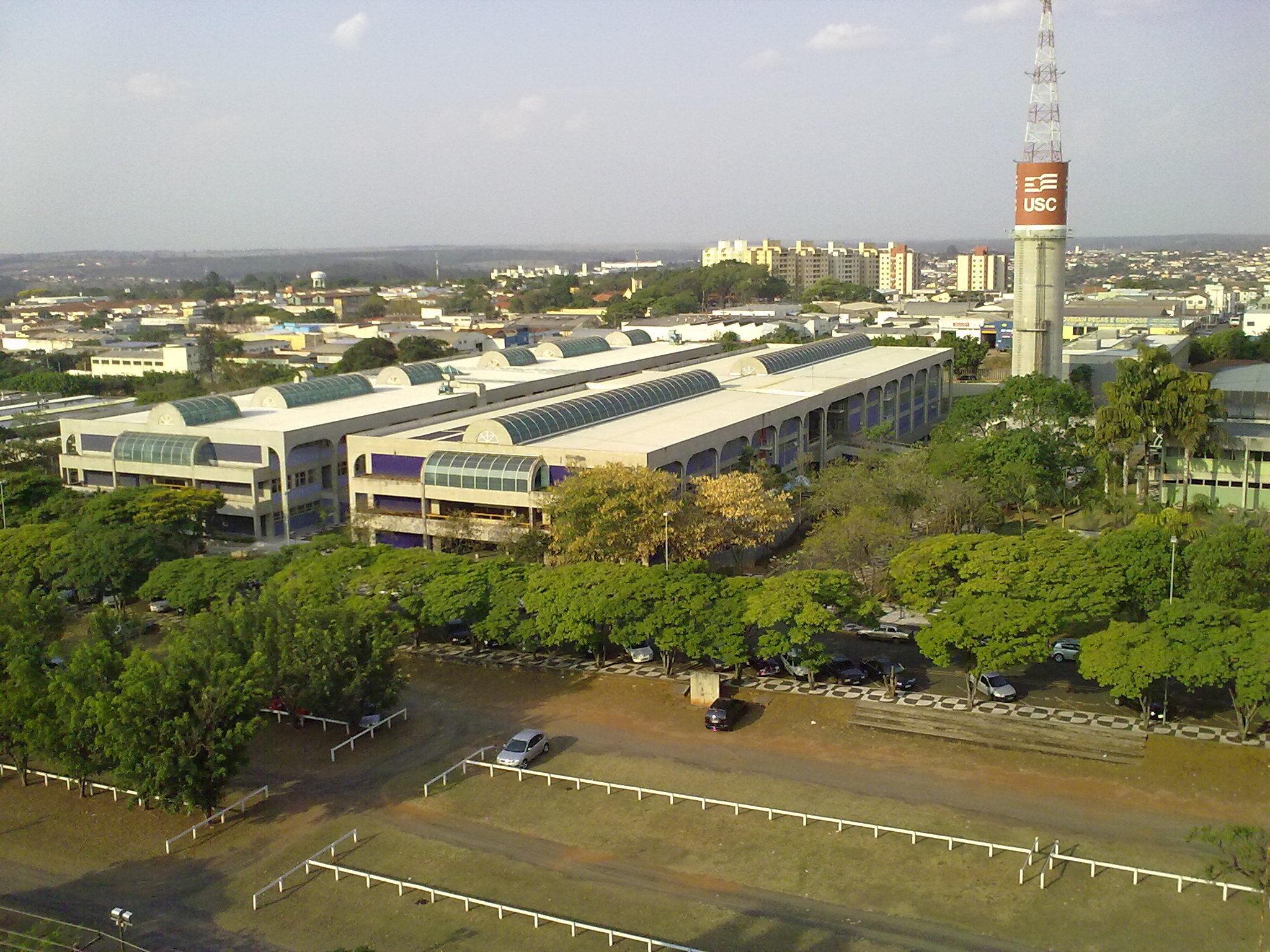
Sacred Heart University

In 2009, the average Basic Education Development Index (IDEB) for Bauru’s public schools was 5.1 (on a scale from 1 to 10). Fifth-year students (formerly 4th grade) scored 5.5, while ninth-year students (formerly 8th grade) scored 4.7. The national average for municipal and state schools was 4.0. For private institutions, the municipal index rose to 6.1 (6.4 for fifth-year students and 5.9 for ninth-year students).

In 2009, Bauru had approximately 66,237 enrollments in public and private schools. According to the IBGE, of the 97 primary schools, 48 were state-run, 48 were municipal, and 33 were private. Of the 51 secondary schools, 32 were state-run, and 19 were private. In 2000, 10.5% of children aged 7 to 14 were not enrolled in primary education. The completion rate for youths aged 15 to 17 was 66.5%. In 2010, the literacy rate for the population aged 15 and older was 99.2%. In 2006, for every 100 girls in primary education (aged 7 to 14), there were 105 boys.

The Bauru Municipal Education Department (SME) coordinates and provides administrative and pedagogical support to the city’s school system. Programs include Adult and Youth Education (EJA), a free education network for adults who have not completed primary education, and Special Education, where students with physical disabilities are guided by specialized teachers.

Bauru also has technical and vocational schools, such as the National Industrial Apprenticeship Service (SENAI), Industrial Social Services (SESI), Bauru Industrial Technical College (CTi), and Rodrigues de Abreu State Technical School (ETEC). The city is home to three public universities: the University of São Paulo (USP), the São Paulo State University (UNESP), which has its largest campus in Bauru, and the Bauru Faculty of Technology (FATEC). Private universities include the Sacred Heart University (USC), Bauru Integrated Faculties (FIB), Paulista University (UNIP), Toledo Educational Institution (ITE), and the medicine course at UNINOVE. Additionally, Bauru hosts a unit of the São Paulo Agribusiness Technology Agency for agricultural research.

Education in Bauru by numbers
Level	Enrollments	Teachers	Schools (total)
Early childhood education	8,786	449	122
Primary education	44,181	1,985	97
Secondary education	13,270	921	51

=== Housing, services, and communication ===
Bauru’s first water supply system was installed in 1912 by then-intendant José Carlos de Freire Figueiredo, operated by the Bauru Water and Sewage Company. The system was reinaugurated on 19 April 1942, drawing water from the Batalha River. By Law No. 1,006 of 24 December 1962, the Bauru Water and Sewage Department (DAE) was established, which has since managed public water and sewage services. In early 2012, there were 29 deep wells (underground springs) and a Batalha River intake station, which supplies 40% of the population. The city has two sewage treatment plants (ETEs), Tibiriçá and Candeia, with plans for a third, Vargem Limpa, expected to begin operations in 2020.

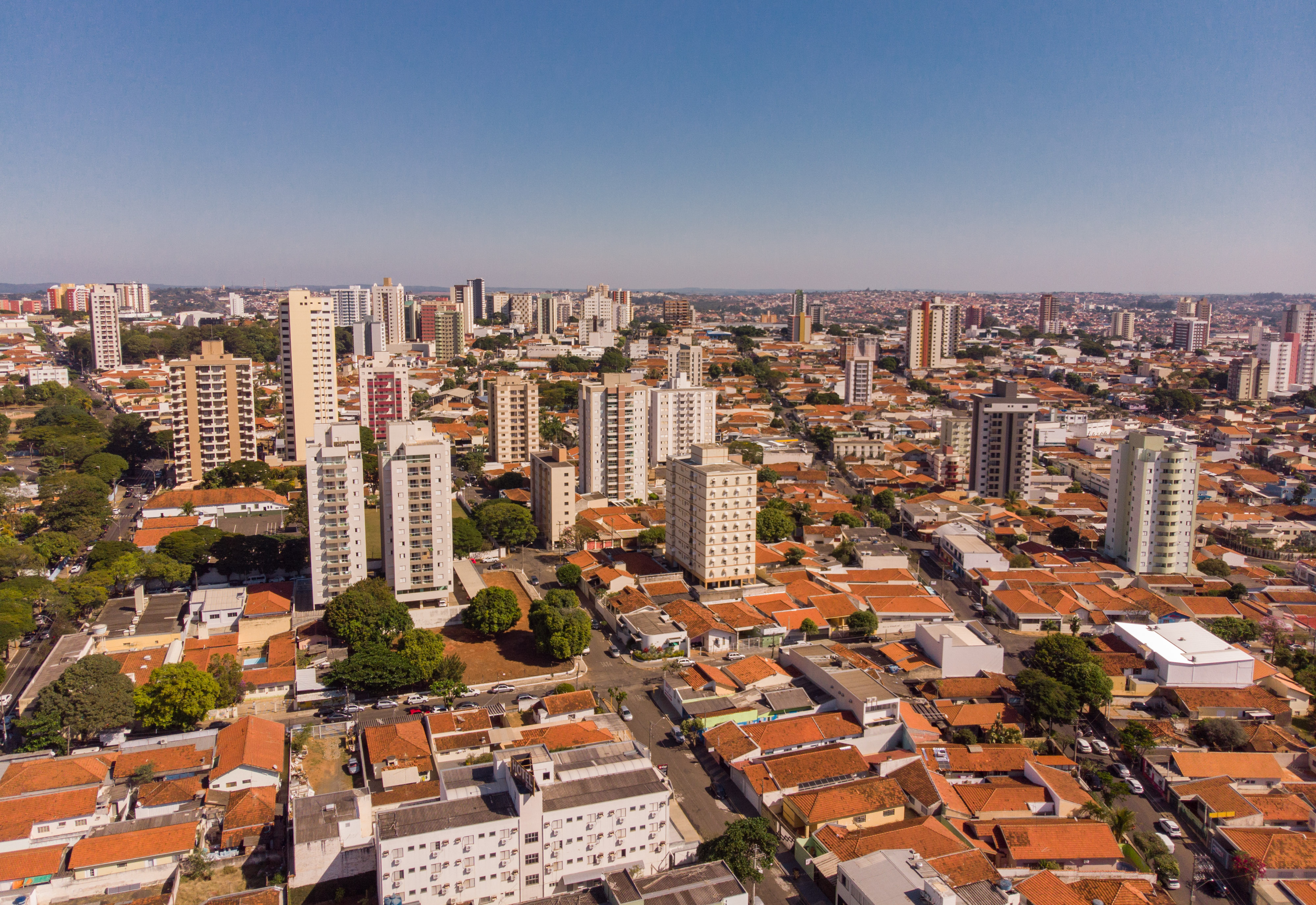
City panorama with numerous residential buildings. Bauru has over 13,000 apartments.

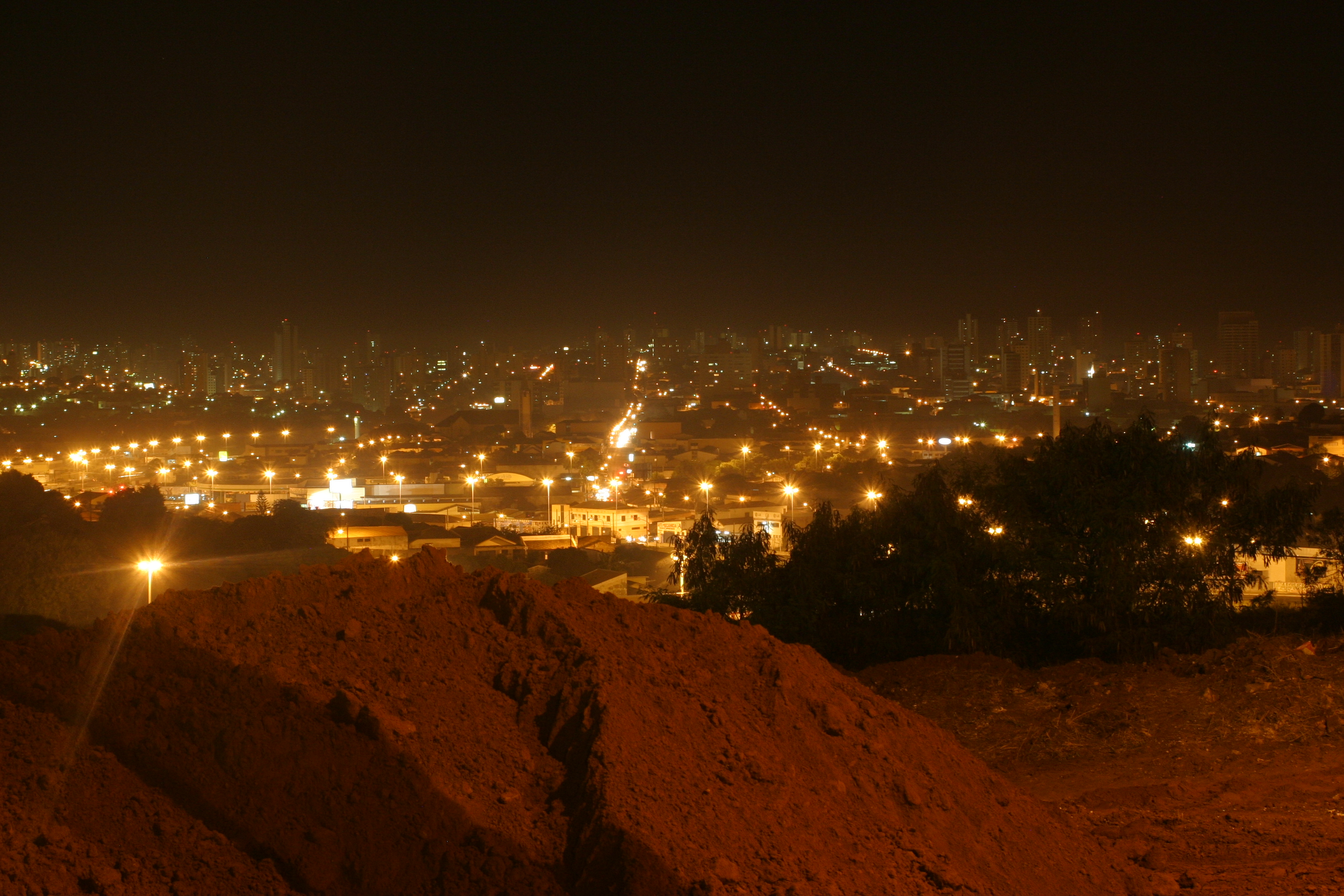
Partial nighttime view of Bauru. According to the CPFL, the city has 39,218 public streetlights installed (March 2011).

In 2010, according to the IBGE, Bauru had 109,875 permanent private households, including 94,653 houses, 13,363 apartments, 1,549 village houses or condominiums, and 310 rooms or shanties. Of these, 78,830 were owned properties (63,365 fully paid, 15,465 under acquisition), 24,841 were rented, 5,780 were provided (1,040 by employers, 4,740 otherwise), and 424 were occupied in other ways. Most of the municipality has access to treated water, electricity, sewage, urban cleaning, fixed-line telephone, and mobile phone services. In 2010, 98.42% of households were served by the general water supply network, 99.4% had garbage collection, and 97.03% had sewage systems.

On 16 March 1911, the city hall inaugurated the first electricity supply service. In 1927, the São Paulo Power and Light Company (CPFL Paulista) took over, currently serving 234 other municipalities in the São Paulo interior. According to CPFL, in March 2011, there were 39,218 public streetlights installed in the city’s streets and avenues. In 2010, 99.85% of the municipality’s households had electricity.

The city offers internet services, including dial-up, broadband (ADSL), and fiber optic (FTTH and FTTX), provided by various free and paid internet service providers. Fixed-line telephony was initially provided by the Brazilian Telephone Company (CTB), which built the city’s first telephone exchange, still in use today. In 1973, São Paulo Telecommunications (TELESP) took over, implementing the direct distance dialing (DDD) system and building additional exchanges. In 1998, TELESP was privatized and sold to Telefônica, which adopted the Vivo brand in 2012. Mobile phone services are offered by various operators, with some areas featuring wireless networks. Bauru’s area code (DDD) is 014, and its postal code ranges from 17000-001 to 17109-999.

Several Ultra High Frequency (UHF) channels are available in digital technology, with major broadcasters having affiliates in Bauru or nearby cities, including RecordTV Paulista (owned by RecordTV), TV TEM Bauru (Rede Globo), and SBT Central (owned by SBT). On 28 March 2018, analog television signals were discontinued in Bauru. The city also has several circulating newspapers. The first, O Bauru, was established in 1906. Current publications include Bom Dia Bauru, Jornal da Cidade, Vivendo Bauru, and Tudo Bauru. The first radio station, Bauru Rádio Clube, began broadcasting on 8 March 1934. Major stations today include Rádio Auri-Verde, Rádio 94 FM Bauru, Rádio 96 FM Bauru, and Rádio Unesp FM.

=== Crime and public safety ===
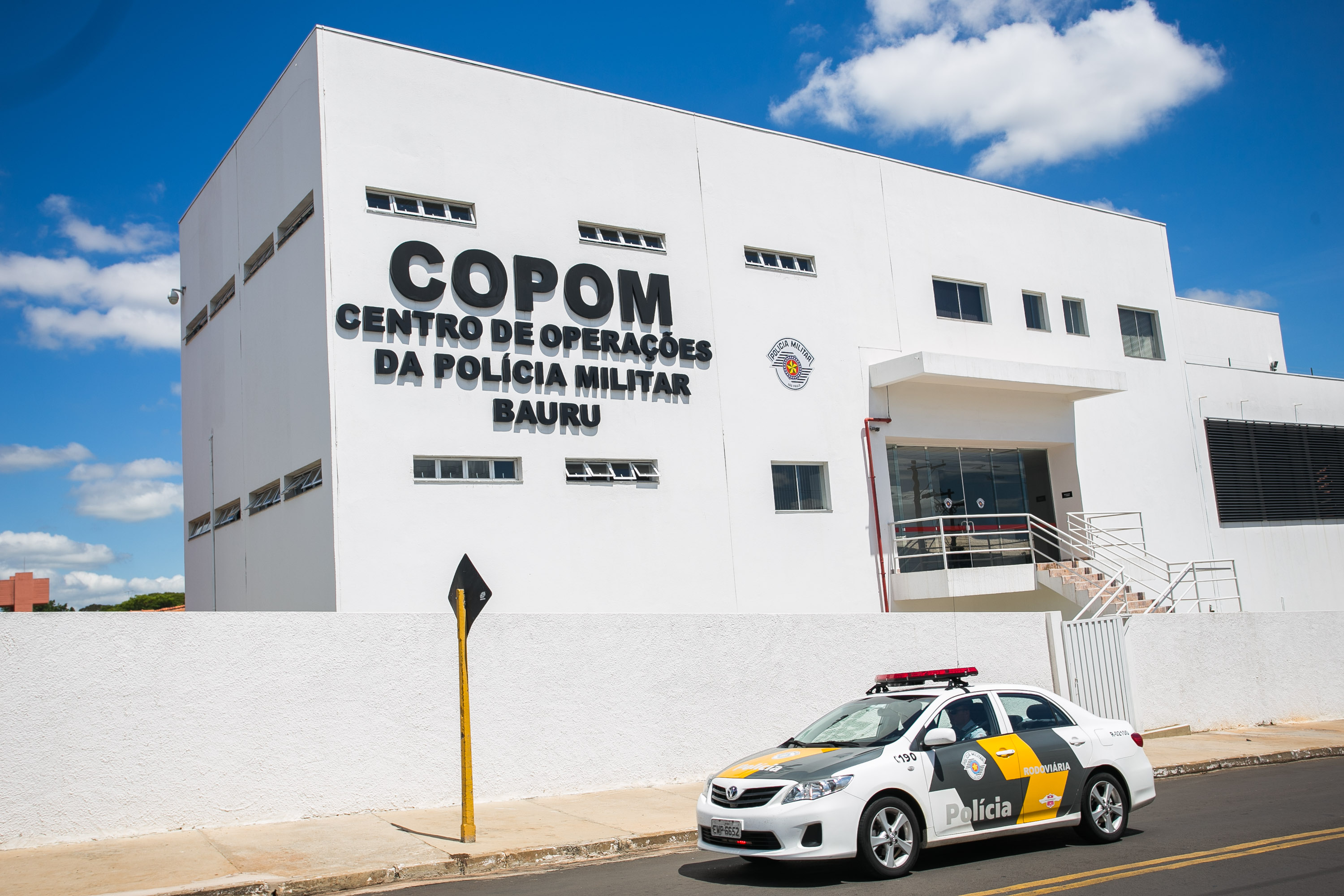
Military Police Operations Center (COPOM)

As in most medium and large Brazilian municipalities, crime remains a challenge in Bauru. In 2008, the homicide rate was 10.0 per 100,000 inhabitants, ranking 62nd in the state and 694th nationally. The suicide rate in 2008 was 7.0 per 100,000 inhabitants, ranking 66th in the state and 735th nationally.

In the 2018 Violence Atlas, produced by the Institute for Applied Economic Research (IPEA) in partnership with the Brazilian Public Safety Forum, Bauru was identified as having the lowest homicide and violent crime rates among Brazilian cities with over 300,000 inhabitants. Among the 309 Brazilian municipalities with over 100,000 inhabitants, Bauru ranked 16th.

=== Air ===
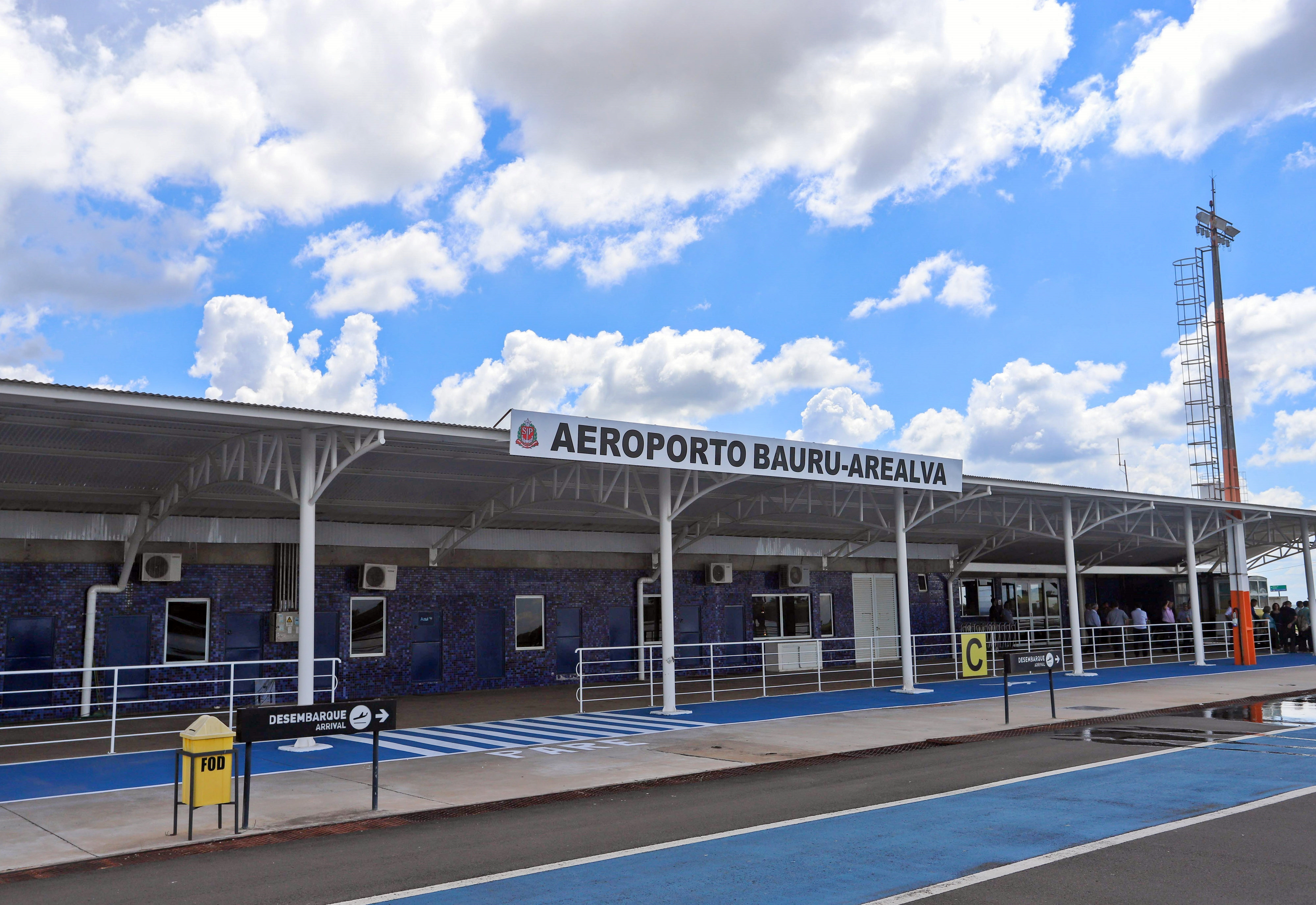
Bauru-Arealva Airport

Bauru has two medium-sized airports, both managed by the São Paulo State Aviation Department (DAESP). The Bauru Airport, inaugurated on 8 April 1939, features a 1,500-meter asphalt runway and a passenger terminal. It hosts an aeroclub and an aircraft and glider workshop and is located less than 3 km from the city center.

The Bauru-Arealva Airport, opened in 2006, has a 2,500 m² passenger terminal, a 2,100-meter runway, and an aircraft maintenance yard. It offers flights to São Paulo and Campinas.

=== Rail ===
The first railway to reach Bauru was the Sorocabana Railway, with the first railway station inaugurated on 22 April 1905. This small station operated until the late 1990s, when the railway, then managed by Ferrovia Paulista S/A (FEPASA), closed.

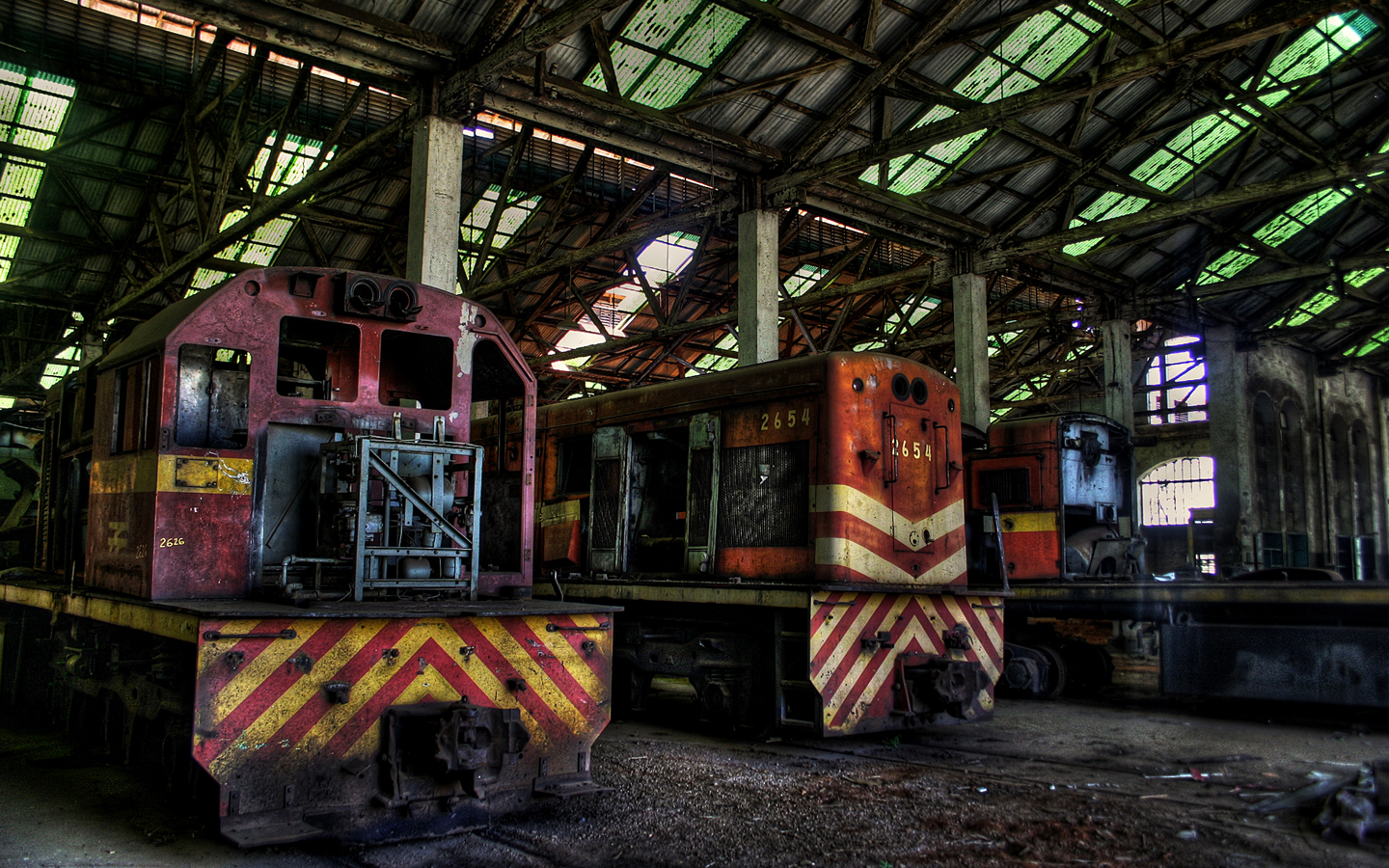
Interior of the former railway station.

The main station, established on 27 September 1906, was one of Brazil’s largest railway junctions between the 1940s and 1950s. It served as a busy passenger terminal and a key hub for cargo loading and unloading. However, in 1997, the railway was sold to Novoeste Railway S.A., and the last passenger train ran on 15 March 2001, leaving the station unused since then. Another medium-sized station, Bauru Paulista, opened on 8 September 1910 and was abandoned by FEPASA in 1997.

Rail transport in Bauru, as in much of São Paulo, declined significantly due to the rise of road and air transport, particularly in the early 1990s. Current efforts focus on preserving the main railway station’s heritage, with its administration transferred to the city hall in 2011.

=== Road ===
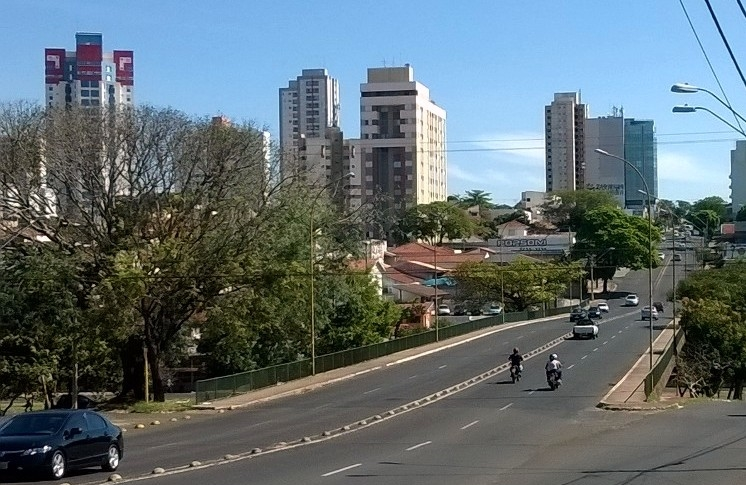
Duque de Caxias Avenue, one of Bauru’s main thoroughfares.

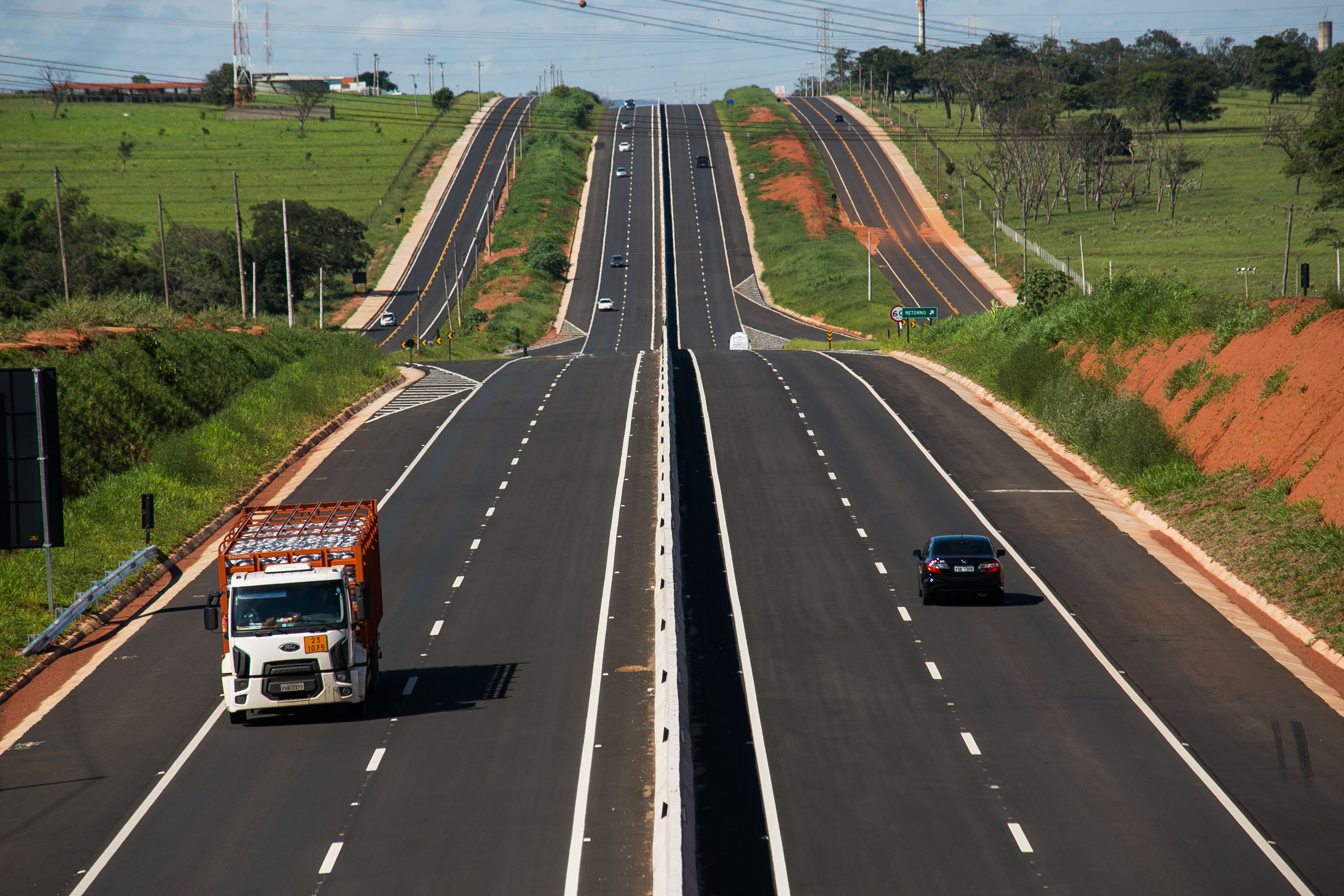
Cezário José de Castilho Highway (SP-321)

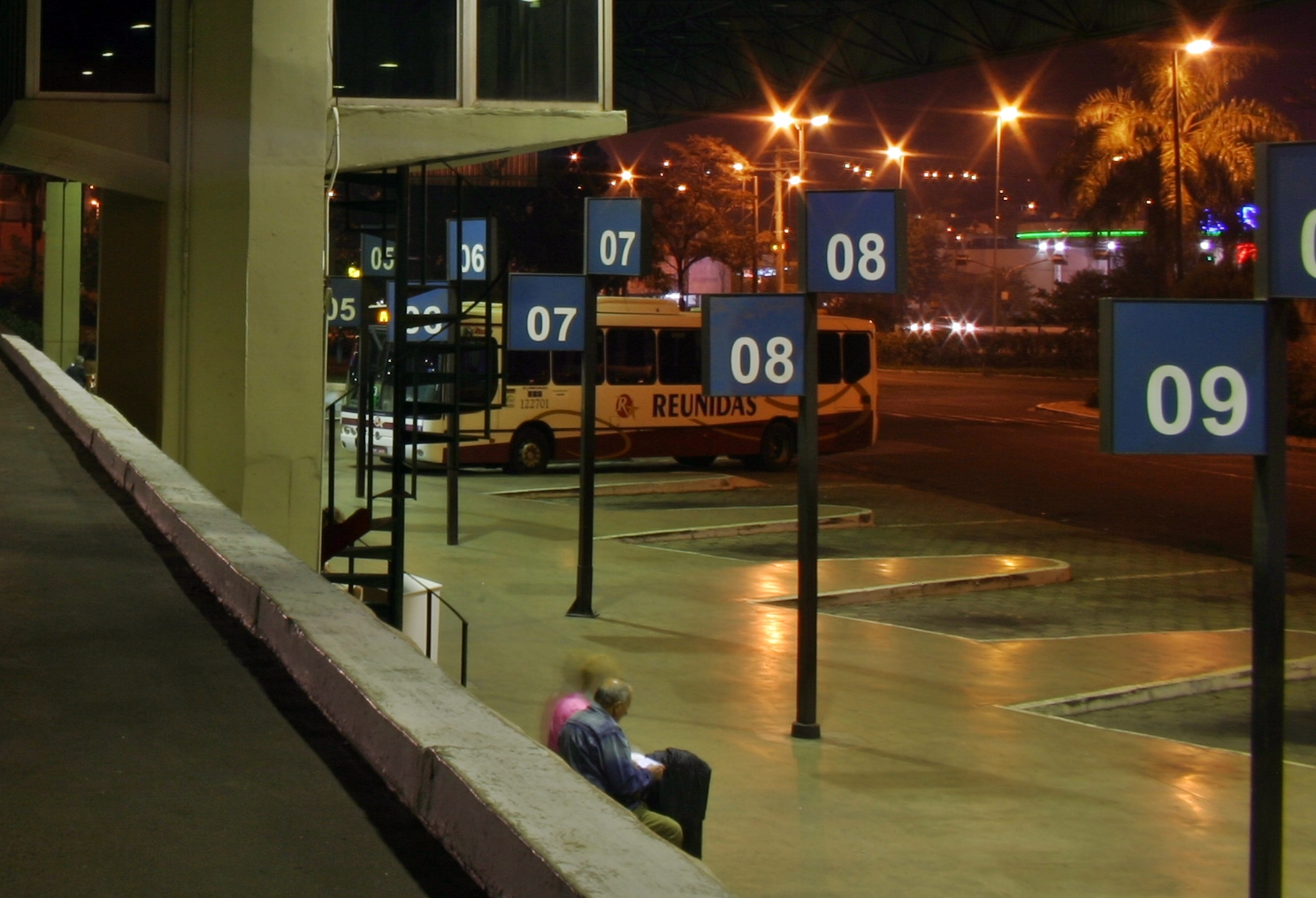
Bauru Bus Terminal

Bauru has an extensive road network connecting it to various cities in the São Paulo interior and the state capital, with access to major state and national highways via paved, dual-lane secondary roads. As part of a major road junction, it offers easy connections to various parts of Brazil. The following highways pass through the municipality: João Ribeiro de Barros and Engineer João Batista Cabral Renno Highways (sections of SP-225); João Ribeiro de Barros Highway (section of SP-294); Marechal Rondon Highway (SP-300); and Cesário José de Carvalho Highway (section of SP-321).

The Bauru Bus Terminal is one of the main terminals in its region, handling an average of 25,000 passengers weekly. The most popular destinations from the terminal are São Paulo, Rio de Janeiro, Belo Horizonte, Curitiba, Campo Grande, Londrina, and Maringá.

=== Urban ===
The Bauru Municipal Urban and Rural Development Company (EMDURB), established by Municipal Law No. 2166 of 25 September 1979, oversees and maintains the city’s traffic, including monitoring public roads, driver and pedestrian behavior, developing traffic engineering projects, paving, building road infrastructure, and managing services such as taxis, alternative transport, chartered and school buses.

In 2010, the municipal vehicle fleet totaled 203,651 vehicles, including 129,388 cars, 4,863 trucks, 608 tractor-trucks, 12,430 pickups, 5,650 vans, 426 minibuses, 37,689 motorcycles, 6,555 scooters, 1,045 buses, 14 wheeled tractors, 549 utility vehicles, and 4,434 other vehicle types.

Dual-lane, paved avenues and numerous traffic lights facilitate city traffic. However, the rapid increase in vehicle numbers over the past decade has led to slower traffic, particularly in the Seat District. Finding parking spaces in the commercial center has also become challenging, impacting local commerce.

Public transportation in Bauru is provided through urban and interurban buses and taxis, considered essential services. Urban bus transport is managed by the Bauru Urban Public Transport Companies Association (Transurb), established in 2002, which in 2010 operated 70 lines covering nearly the entire city. Transurb represents three public transport concessionaires: Grande Bauru Public Transport, Baurutrans CN General Transport, and Cidade Sem Limites.

== Culture ==
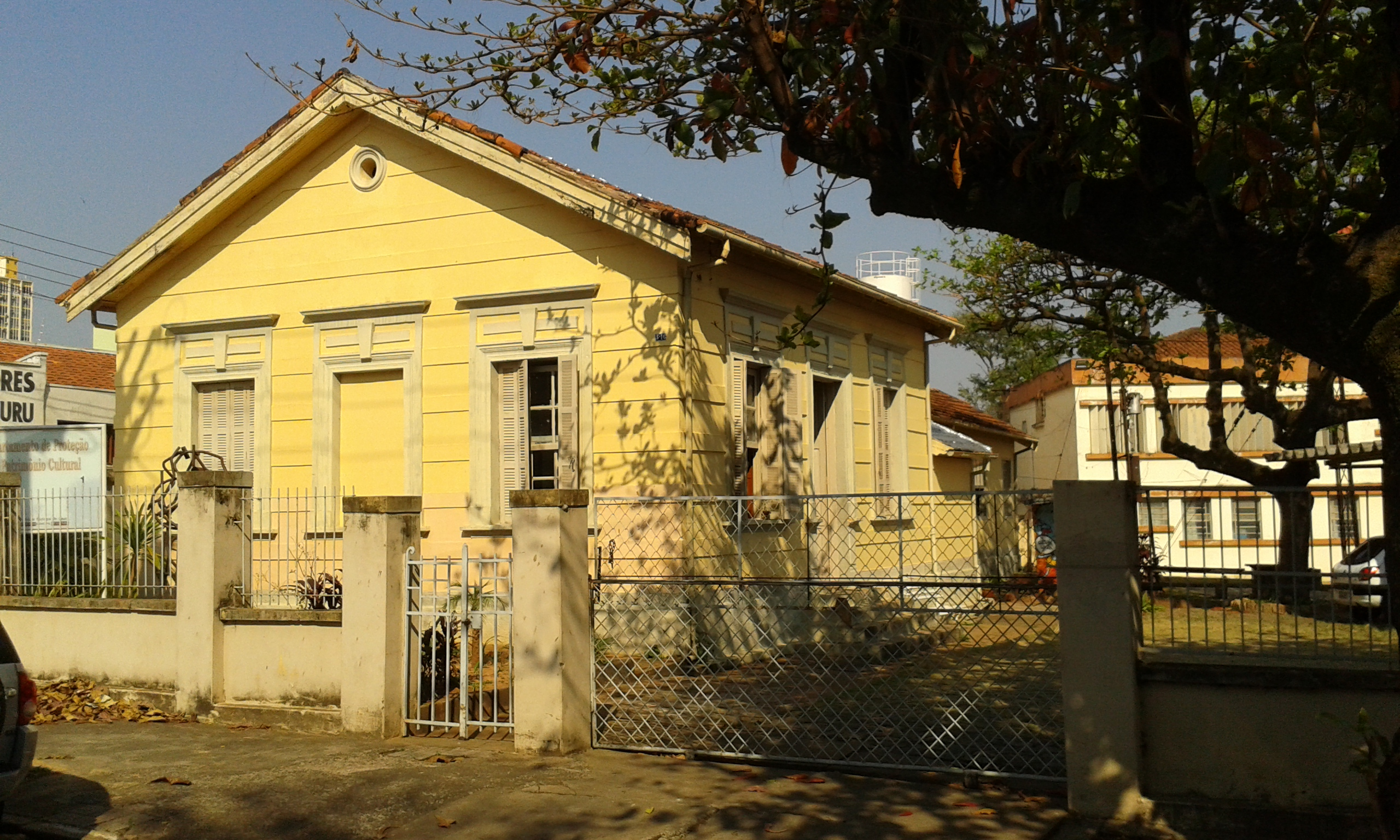
Bauru Municipal Historical Museum.

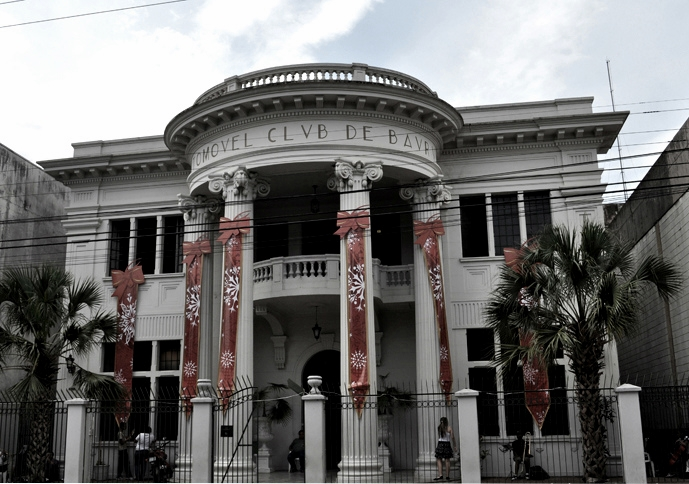
Automobile Club of Bauru, the headquarters of the city's Symphony Orchestra.

The cultural sector in Bauru is managed by the Municipal Secretariat of Culture, which is tasked with planning and implementing the municipality's cultural policies through the development of programs, projects, and activities aimed at fostering cultural growth. Established in 1993, the Secretariat is divided into two departments: the Department of Cultural Action and the Department of Historical Heritage. The latter assesses the needs of cultural spaces and the Secretariat itself, while the former promotes the municipal policy for the protection of cultural heritage.

Bauru is also the birthplace of numerous singers, composers, and artists who have achieved national or international recognition, including José Marciano, Luiz de Carvalho, Chico Dehira, Edson Celulari, Tina Kara, Paulo Villaça, Gustavo Haddad, as well as the astronaut Marcos Pontes and the journalist Amauri Soares, among others.

Within the urban area, key attractions include a variety of hotels, restaurants, museums, bars, fast-food chains, cinemas, and shopping centers, as well as a pedestrian walkway in the city center and a concentration of shops extending from the central area to the southern region. The Automobile Club of Bauru, for instance, inaugurated on 8 April 1939, frequently hosts events and features a spacious venue with distinctive architectural elements.

=== Performing arts ===
Bauru is home to several venues dedicated to cultural events in theater and music. The Bauru Municipal Theater is a significant cultural hub both locally and statewide, offering a diverse range of renowned performances and attractions throughout the year. It occasionally hosts public musical performances, fairs, and exhibitions. Another notable venue is the Bauru Cultural Center, which was inaugurated on 15 March 1942.

The Secretariat of Culture also provides art classes to the community. The Arts Education Division serves over 500 students per semester in courses such as guitar, flute, classical ballet, jazz dance, street dance, modern dance, theater, drawing, ceramics, and capoeira. It also forms dance groups composed of students who represent the city at festivals across the state and throughout Brazil.

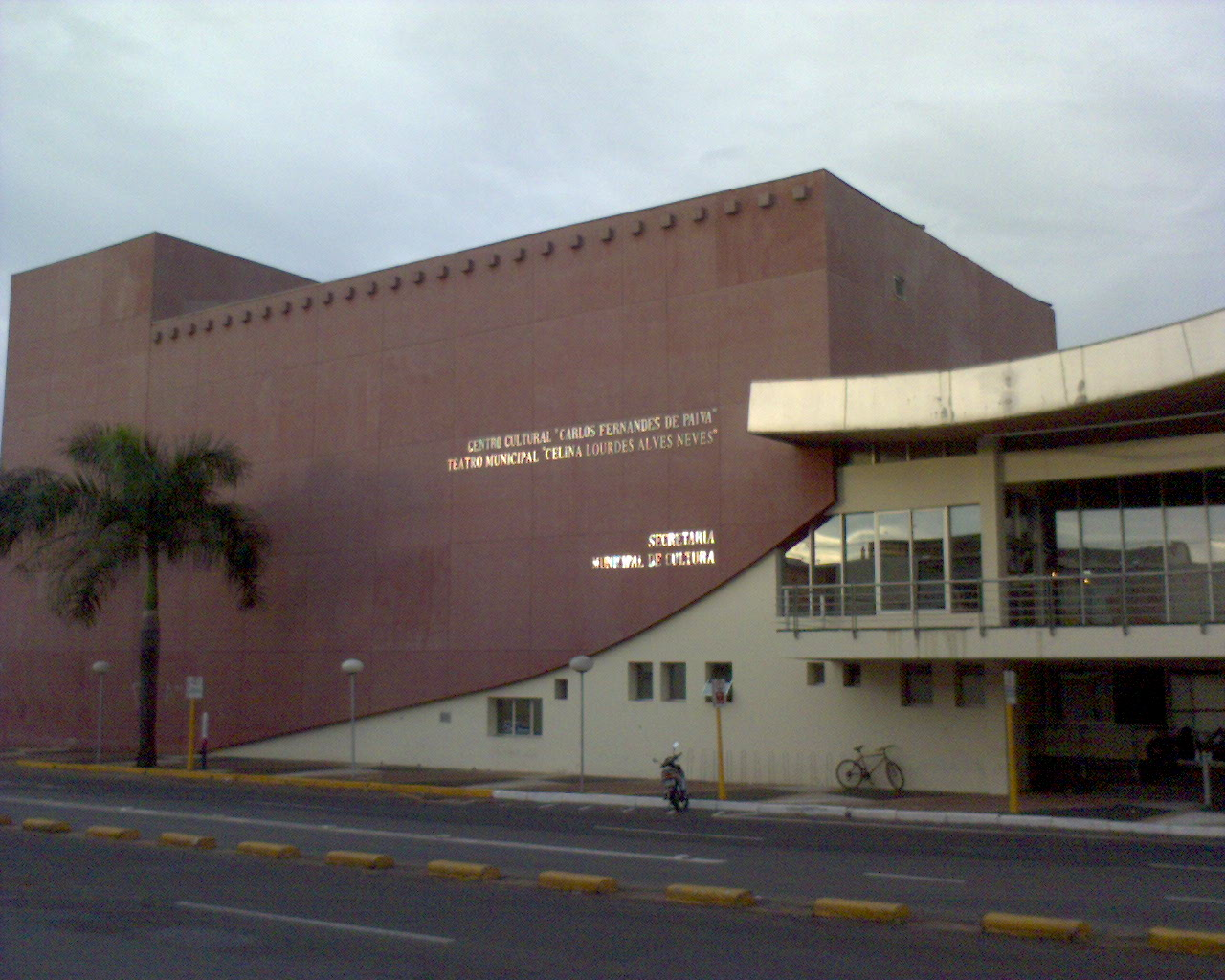
Celina Lourdes Alves Neves Theater.

The Municipal Library System comprises the Rodrigues de Abreu Municipal Library, the Ivan Engler de Almeida Children's Library, the Aucione Torres Agostinho Comic Library, eight smaller libraries, and mobile "Bibliobus" units that serve events and schools by appointment. The Bauru Central Library has been computerized since August 2002, offering over 44,000 works, as well as periodicals, videos, and a newspaper archive. The eight smaller libraries collectively hold a collection of 16,000 items. The city is also home to three museums: the Image and Sound Museum, the Bauru Regional Railway Museum, and the Bauru Municipal Historical Museum.

Bauru has 15 movie theaters, considered among the most modern in the region, attracting audiences from neighboring cities. These theaters are located at Bauru Shopping-Multiplex Cinema (five screens, including one with THX sound and one 3D screen), Boulevard Shopping Bauru-Cinépolis (six screens, including one Macro XE), and Alameda Quality Center-Cine ‘n Fun (four screens, all with THX sound). The cineclub movement, which was highly active in Bauru during the 1960s and 1970s (with the city hosting up to four cineclubs simultaneously, one dedicated to screening full operas), no longer has a permanent cineclub.

=== Events ===
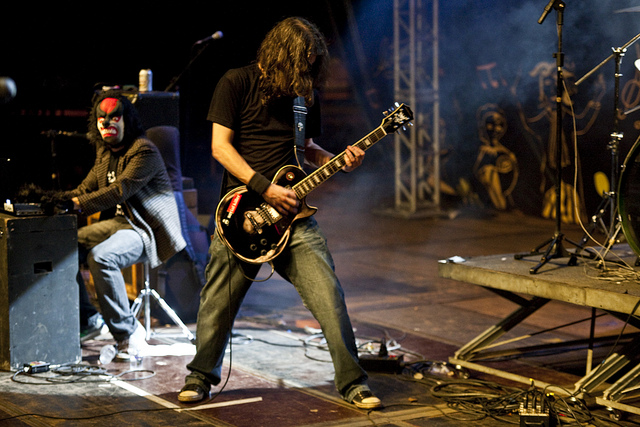
Rock concert at the 2010 Virada Cultural in Bauru.

Bauru is one of the host municipalities of the Virada Cultural Paulista, an annual event held in various cities across São Paulo state, modeled after the Virada Cultural in the state capital. Organized in Bauru since 2007, the event aims to provide 24 hours of continuous cultural activities, including musical performances across various genres, theater productions, and art and history exhibitions.

The Bauru Carnival was regarded in the 1980s as the most famous in the interior of São Paulo. The Bauru Municipal Sambadrome was the second to be inaugurated in Brazil, surpassed only by the Marquês de Sapucaí Sambadrome. In the early 2000s, the samba school parades were broadcast live online, a novelty at the time, having previously been transmitted via radio and, less frequently, local television channels. However, official parades were suspended starting in 2002, with no formal competition. The parades resumed in 2010, and organizers are gradually working to restore the event’s prominence from past decades.

=== Sports ===
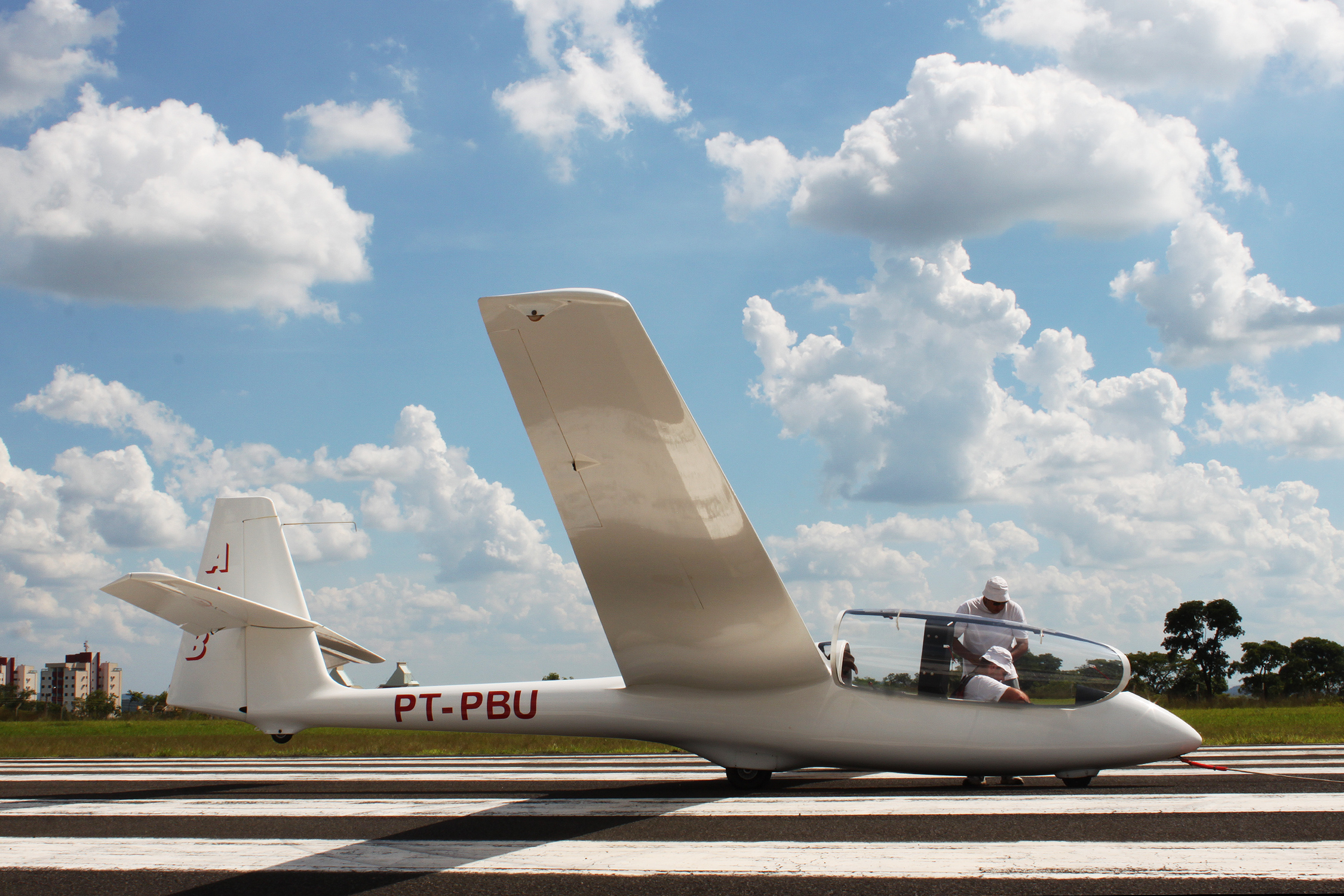
Glider at the Bauru Airport.

Bauru is home to several sports clubs, including Esporte Clube Noroeste, the city’s largest and one of the most traditional football teams in São Paulo, founded on 1 September 1910. Its stadium, Estádio Alfredo de Castilho, is the largest in Bauru, with a capacity of over 17,000 spectators. The city also hosts an amateur football championship with two divisions and numerous clubs, with Parquinho Futebol Clube standing out as the most successful in the amateur scene. Additionally, Bauru is notable for being the city where Pelé began his career, playing in the youth categories of Bauru Atlético Clube before transferring to Santos FC.

Beyond football, Bauru offers facilities for various sports. American football is represented by the Bauru Hunters, active since 2009. The Bauru Aeroclub, located at the Bauru Airport, is the largest gliding center in Brazil, boasting the country’s largest and most diverse fleet of gliders and currently leading the national gliding rankings. In motorsports, the “Toca da Coruja” kart track hosts regional, state, and national karting and motorcycle competitions. In basketball, the Bauru Basket has won the São Paulo State Basketball Championship in 1999, 2013, and 2014; the Brazilian Basketball Championship in 2002 and 2016-17; the South American Basketball League in 2014; the FIBA Americas League in 2015; and was runner-up in the FIBA Intercontinental Cup in 2015. In volleyball, the city is represented by SESI Vôlei Bauru, which won the São Paulo State Championship in 2018 and competes in the Women’s Superliga.

=== Holidays ===
Bauru observes two municipal holidays, eight national holidays, and six optional holidays. The municipal holidays are the city’s anniversary, celebrated on 1 August, and All Souls’ Day, observed on 2 November. According to federal law No. 9,093, enacted on 12 September 1995, municipalities may designate up to four religious municipal holidays, including Good Friday.

== Sister cities ==
- Tenri, Japan, since 1970.
- Sibiu, Romania, since 1995.

== Notable people ==
- Alecsandro, football player
- Airton Daré, racing driver
- Kerolin, football player
- Diltor Opromolla, leprosy researcher
- Pelé, football player
- Marcos Pontes, Aeronautical engineer, Astronaut, Fighter pilot, Recipient of National Order of Merit
- Mário Sabino, judoka
- Ozires Silva, Aeronautical engineer, founder of Embraer

== See also ==
- List of municipalities in São Paulo
