= Viação Aérea Arco-Íris =

Brazilian airline

Viação Aérea Arco-Íris S.A.
- Founded: 1945
- Commenced operations: 1946
- Ceased operations: 1948
- Operating bases: São Paulo-Congonhas

Viação Aérea Arco-Íris S.A. was a Brazilian airline founded in 1945. Flight operations ceased in 1948.

== History ==
Arco-Íris was founded in March 1945 and the first flight was operated on July 12, 1946 between São Paulo-Congonhas and cities within the states of São Paulo and Paraná, being the first carrier to serve Londrina.

Due to financial problems the airline ceased operations in 1948. It was later sold to a group of entrepreneurs from Rio Grande do Sul, who moved its head-office to Caxias do Sul, right on the main operational area of Varig. For this reason, the new owners had extreme difficulty in establishing operations. Finally in 1950 Arco-Íris had its operational authorization cancelled.

== Destinations ==
Arco-Íris served the following cities:

- Assis – Assis Airport
- Londrina – Londrina Airport
- Marília – Marília Airport
- Ourinhos – Ourinhos Airport
- Presidente Prudente – Presidente Prudente Airport
- São Paulo – Congonhas Airport

== Fleet ==
Viação Aérea Arco-Íris fleet
Aircraft	Total	Years of operation	Notes
de Havilland DH-89A Dragon Rapide	7	1946–1948	

== Accidents and incidents ==
- 1946: a de Havilland DH-89A Dragon Rapide registration PP-AID crashed upon touch down at São Paulo-Congonhas due to cross-winds. One passenger survived.

== See also ==
- List of defunct airlines of Brazil
