= DAESP =

- Type: State company
- Industry: Aviation
- Products: Airports administration

DAESP - Departamento Aeroviário do Estado de São Paulo (English: Airways Department of São Paulo State) was the São Paulo state (in Brazil) aviation department. DAESP was part of the Secretaria de Transportes do Governo do Estado de São Paulo (English: Transportation Secretariat of the State of São Paulo), and was responsible for the management of 21 public airports within the state, in accordance to directives from the National Civil Aviation Agency of Brazil (ANAC).

It was created in 1963 as Diretoria de Aeroportos (English: Directorate of Airports) of the Secretaria de Viação e Obras Públicas (English: Public Works and Transit Secretariat). This Directorate was changed to DAESP in 1966.

DAESP was extinct on April 14, 2022.

== Concessions ==
On December 26 and 28, 2012 the management of the three airports below was transferred to their respective municipalities:

- Botucatu – Tancredo de Almeida Neves Airport
- Lins – Gov. Lucas Nogueira Garcez Airport
- Piracicaba – Pedro Morganti Airport

On March 15, 2017 the consortium Voa São Paulo was granted the concession to operate five airports previously operated by DAESP. They are:

- Bragança Paulista – Arthur Siqueira Airport
- Campinas – Campo dos Amarais Airport
- Itanhaém – Antônio Ribeiro Nogueira Jr. Airport
- Jundiaí – Comte. Rolim Adolfo Amaro Airport
- Ubatuba – Gastão Madeira Airport

On February 16, 2018 the management of the airport below was transferred to its municipality:

- Ourinhos – Jornalista Benedito Pimentel Airport

On July 15, 2021 all remaining airports managed by DAESP had their concessions auctioned to private entities. The winners were the following consortia:

Consórcio Aeroportos Paulista, related to Socicam and Dix:

- Andradina – Paulino Ribeiro de Andrade Airport
- Araçatuba – Dario Guarita Airport
- Assis – Marcelo Pires Halzhausen Airport
- Barretos – Chafei Amsei Airport
- Dracena – Muliterno de Dracena Airport
- Penápolis – Dr. Ramalho Franco Airport
- Presidente Epitácio – Geraldo Moacir Bordon Airport
- Presidente Prudente – Presidente Prudente Airport
- São José do Rio Preto – Prof. Eribelto Manoel Reino Airport
- Tupã – José Vicente Faria Lima Airport
- Votuporanga – Domingos Pignatari Airport

Consórcio Rede Voa, related to Voa São Paulo:

- Araraquara – Bartholomeu de Gusmão Airport
- Avaré / Arandu – Comte. Luiz Gonzaga Luth Airport
- Bauru / Arealva – Moussa Nakhl Tobias Airport
- Franca – Ten. Lund Presotto Airport
- Guaratinguetá – Edu Chaves Airport
- Marília – Frank Miloye Milenkovich Airport
- Registro – Alberto Bertelli State Airport
- Ribeirão Preto – Dr. Leite Lopes Airport
- São Carlos – Mário Pereira Lopes Airport
- São Manuel – Nelson Garófalo Airport
- Sorocaba – Bertram Luiz Leupolz Airport

== List of airports once managed by DAESP ==
The following airports were once managed by DAESP:

- Andradina – Paulino Ribeiro de Andrade Airport
- Araçatuba – Dario Guarita Airport
- Araraquara – Bartolomeu de Gusmão Airport
- Assis – Marcelo Pires Halzhausen Airport
- Avaré / Arandu – Comte. Luiz Gonzaga Luth Airport
- Barretos – Chafei Amsei Airport
- Bauru – Comte. João Ribeiro de Barros Airport
- Bauru / Arealva – Moussa Nakhl Tobias Airport
- Botucatu – Tancredo de Almeida Neves Airport
- Bragança Paulista – Arthur Siqueira Airport
- Campinas – Campo dos Amarais Airport
- Castilho / Urubupungá – Ernesto Pochler Airport
- Dracena – Muliterno de Dracena Airport
- Franca – Ten. Lund Presotto Airport
- Guaratinguetá – Edu Chaves Airport
- Itanhaém – Antônio Ribeiro Nogueira Jr. Airport
- Jundiaí – Comte. Rolim Adolfo Amaro Airport
- Lins – Gov. Lucas Nogueira Garcez Airport Airport
- Marília – Frank Miloye Milenkovich Airport
- Ourinhos – Jornalista Benedito Pimentel Airport
- Penápolis – Dr. Ramalho Franco Airport
- Piracicaba – Pedro Morganti Airport
- Presidente Epitácio – Geraldo Moacir Bordon Airport
- Presidente Prudente – Presidente Prudente Airport
- Registro – Alberto Bertelli State Airport
- Ribeirão Preto – Dr. Leite Lopes Airport
- São Carlos – Mário Pereira Lopes Airport
- São José do Rio Preto – Prof. Eribelto Manoel Reino Airport
- São Manuel – Nelson Garófalo Airport
- Sorocaba – Bertram Luiz Leupolz Airport
- Tupã – José Vicente Faria Lima Airport
- Ubatuba – Gastão Madeira Airport
- Votuporanga – Domingos Pignatari Airport

== Top 5 ==
In 2015 those were the top 5 airports according to number of transported passengers, metric tonnes of cargo handled, and number of aircraft operations:

=== Number of transported passengers ===
- 1 - Ribeirão Preto – Dr. Leite Lopes Airport – 1,109,809
- 2 - São José do Rio Preto – Prof. Eribelto Manoel Reino Airport – 691,559
- 3 - Presidente Prudente – Presidente Prudente Airport – 272,204
- 4 - Bauru/Arealva – Moussa Nakhl Tobias Airport – 143,015
- 5 - Araçatuba – Dario Guarita Airport – 108,993

=== Metric tonnes of cargo handled ===
- 1 - Bauru/Arealva – Moussa Nakhl Tobias Airport – 1,502
- 2 - Ribeirão Preto – Dr. Leite Lopes Airport – 1,057
- 3 - Marília – Frank Miloye Milenkowichi Airport – 735
- 4 - Sorocaba – Bertram Luiz Leupolz Airport – 368
- 5 - Jundiaí – Comte. Rolim Adolfo Amaro Airport – 357

=== Number of aircraft operations ===
- 1 - Jundiaí – Comte. Rolim Adolfo Amaro Airport – 81,211
- 2 - Sorocaba – Bertram Luiz Leupolz Airport – 61,846
- 3 - Campinas – Campo dos Amarais Airport – 49,385
- 4 - Ribeirão Preto – Dr. Leite Lopes Airport – 46,360
- 5 - Bragança Paulista – Arthur Siqueira Airport – 37,121

== See also ==
- List of airports in Brazil
