= Dracena Airport =

Muliterno de Dracena State Airport Aeroporto Estadual Muliterno de Dracena
- IATA: QDC; ICAO: SDDR; LID: SP0021

Summary
- Airport type: Public
- Operator: DAESP (?–2021); ASP (2021–present)
- Serves: Dracena
- Time zone: BRT (UTC−03:00)
- Elevation AMSL: 372 m (1,220 ft)
- Coordinates: 21°27′38″S 051°36′25″W
- Website: aeroportospaulistas.com.br/dracena/

Map
- Location in Brazil QDC (Brazil)

Runways
Direction	Length		Surface
Direction	m	ft	Surface
09/27	1,500	4,921	Asphalt
- Sources: Airport Website, ANAC, DECEA

Muliterno de Dracena State Airport (IATA: QDC, ICAO: SDDR) is the airport serving Dracena, Brazil.

It is operated by ASP.

== History ==
On July 15, 2021, the concession of the airport was auctioned to the Aeroportos Paulista Consortium (ASP), comprised by companies Socicam and Dix. The airport was previously operated by DAESP.

== Access ==
The airport is located 9 km (6 mi) from downtown Dracena.

== See also ==
- List of airports in Brazil
