= Botucatu Airport =

Tancredo de Almeida Neves Airport Aeroporto Tancredo de Almeida Neves
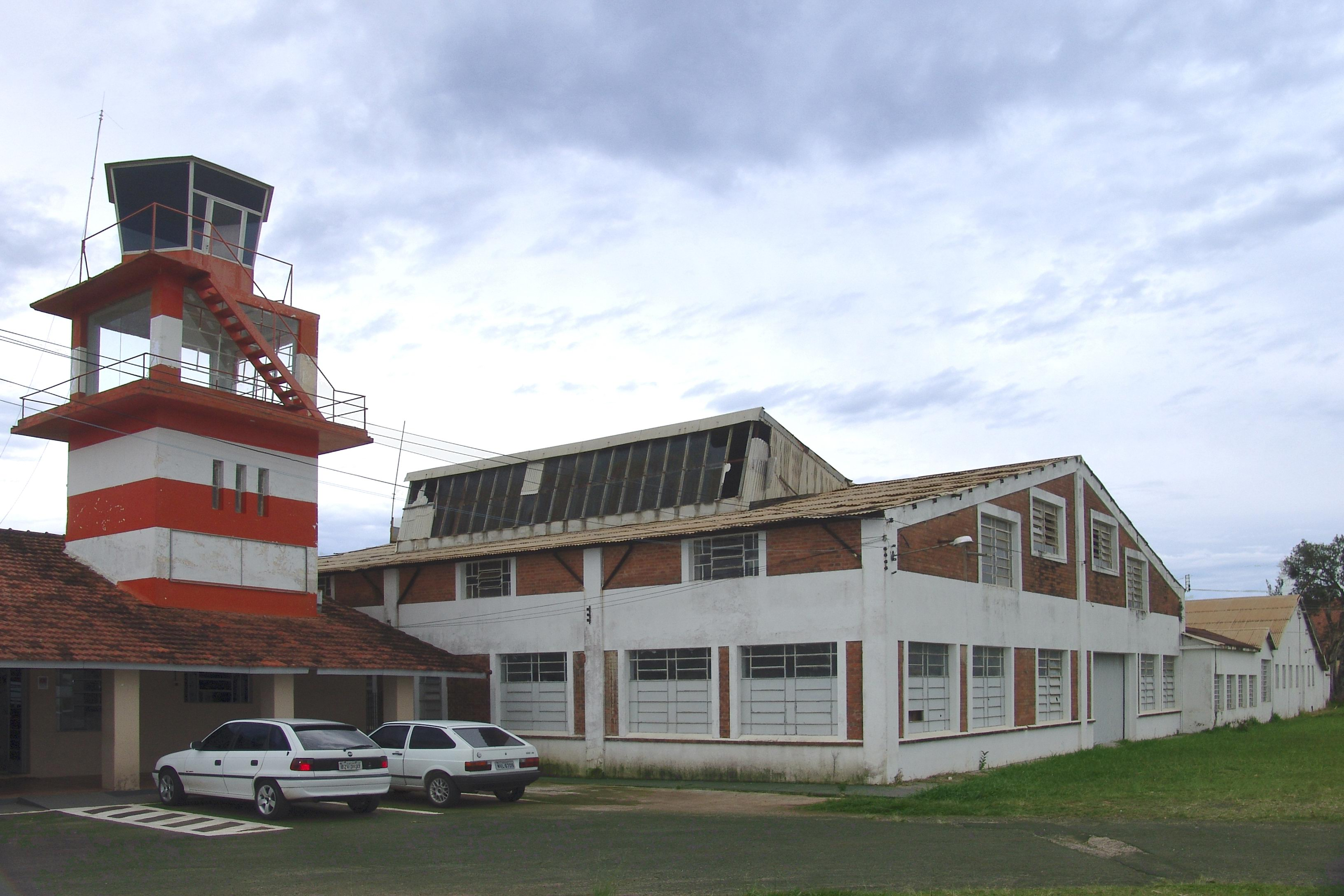
- IATA: QCP; ICAO: SDBK; LID: SP0019

Summary
- Airport type: Public
- Operator: DAESP (?–2012); Botucatu (2012–present)
- Serves: Botucatu
- Time zone: BRT (UTC−03:00)
- Elevation AMSL: 888 m (2,913 ft)
- Coordinates: 22°56′16″S 048°28′05″W

Map
- Location in Brazil QCP (Brazil)

Runways
Direction	Length		Surface
Direction	m	ft	Surface
01/19	1,500	4,921	Asphalt
- Sources: ANAC, DECEA

Tancredo de Almeida Neves Airport (IATA: QCP, ICAO: SDBK), is an airport serving Botucatu, Brazil.

It is operated by the Municipality of Botucatu.

== History ==
In 2012 the administration of the airport was transferred to the Municipality of Botucatu. Previously it was administrated by DAESP.

== Access ==
The airport is located 10 km (6 mi) from downtown Botucatu.

== See also ==
- List of airports in Brazil
