= Bragança Paulista Airport =

Arthur Siqueira State Airport Aeroporto Estadual Arthur Siqueira
- IATA: BJP; ICAO: SBBP; LID: SP0036

Summary
- Airport type: Public
- Operator: DAESP (?–2019); Rede Voa (2019–present)
- Serves: Bragança Paulista
- Time zone: BRT (UTC−03:00)
- Elevation AMSL: 893 m (2,930 ft)
- Coordinates: 22°58′44″S 046°32′14″W
- Website: www.voa-sp.com.br/aeroporto/aeroporto-estadual-arthur-siqueira/

Map
- Location in Brazil BJP (Brazil)

Runways
Direction	Length		Surface
Direction	m	ft	Surface
16/34	1,200	3,937	Asphalt

Statistics (2015)
- Passengers: 36,624 ▼4%
- Aircraft Operations: 37,121 ▼1%
- Metric tonnes of cargo: 3 ▲50%
- Statistics: DAESP; Sources: Airport Website, ANAC, DECEA

Arthur Siqueira State Airport (IATA: BJP, ICAO: SBBP) is the airport serving Bragança Paulista, Brazil.

It is operated by Rede Voa.

== History ==
On March 15, 2017 Voa São Paulo was granted by the government of the State of São Paulo the concession to operate this facility, previously operated by DAESP.

== Access ==
The airport is located 3 km (2 mi) from downtown Bragança Paulista.

== See also ==
- List of airports in Brazil
