= SBJD =

SBJD may refer to:

- Jundiaí Airport (ICAO: SBJD), in Brazil
- Sino-British Joint Declaration, a treaty signed in 1984
