= Piracicaba Airport =

Pedro Morganti Airport Aeroporto Pedro Morganti
- IATA: QHB; ICAO: SDPW; LID: SP0041

Summary
- Airport type: Public
- Operator: DAESP (?–2012); Piracicaba (2012–present)
- Serves: Piracicaba
- Time zone: BRT (UTC−03:00)
- Elevation AMSL: 584 m (1,916 ft)
- Coordinates: 22°42′38″S 047°37′10″W

Map
- Location in Brazil QHB (Brazil)

Runways
| Direction | Length | | Surface |
| Direction | m | ft | Surface |
|---|---|---|---|
| 17/35 | 1,200 | 3,937 | Asphalt |
- Sources: ANAC, DECEA

Pedro Morganti Airport (IATA: QHB, ICAO: SDPW), is an airport serving Piracicaba, Brazil.

It is operated by the Municipality of Piracicaba.

== History ==
In 2012 the administration of the airport was transferred to the Municipality of Piracicaba. Previously it was administrated by DAESP.

== Accidents and incidents ==
- 14 September 2021: a Beechcraft B200GT King Air 250, registration PS-CSM, belonging to CSM Agropecuária crashed shortly after takeoff. The aircraft was destroyed and all seven on board were killed.

== Access ==
The airport is located 5 km (3 mi) from downtown Piracicaba.

== See also ==
- List of airports in Brazil
