= Campo dos Amarais Airport =

Airport in São Paulo, Brazil

Campo dos Amarais–Prefeito Francisco Amaral State Airport Aeroporto Estadual Campo dos Amarais–Prefeito Francisco Amaral
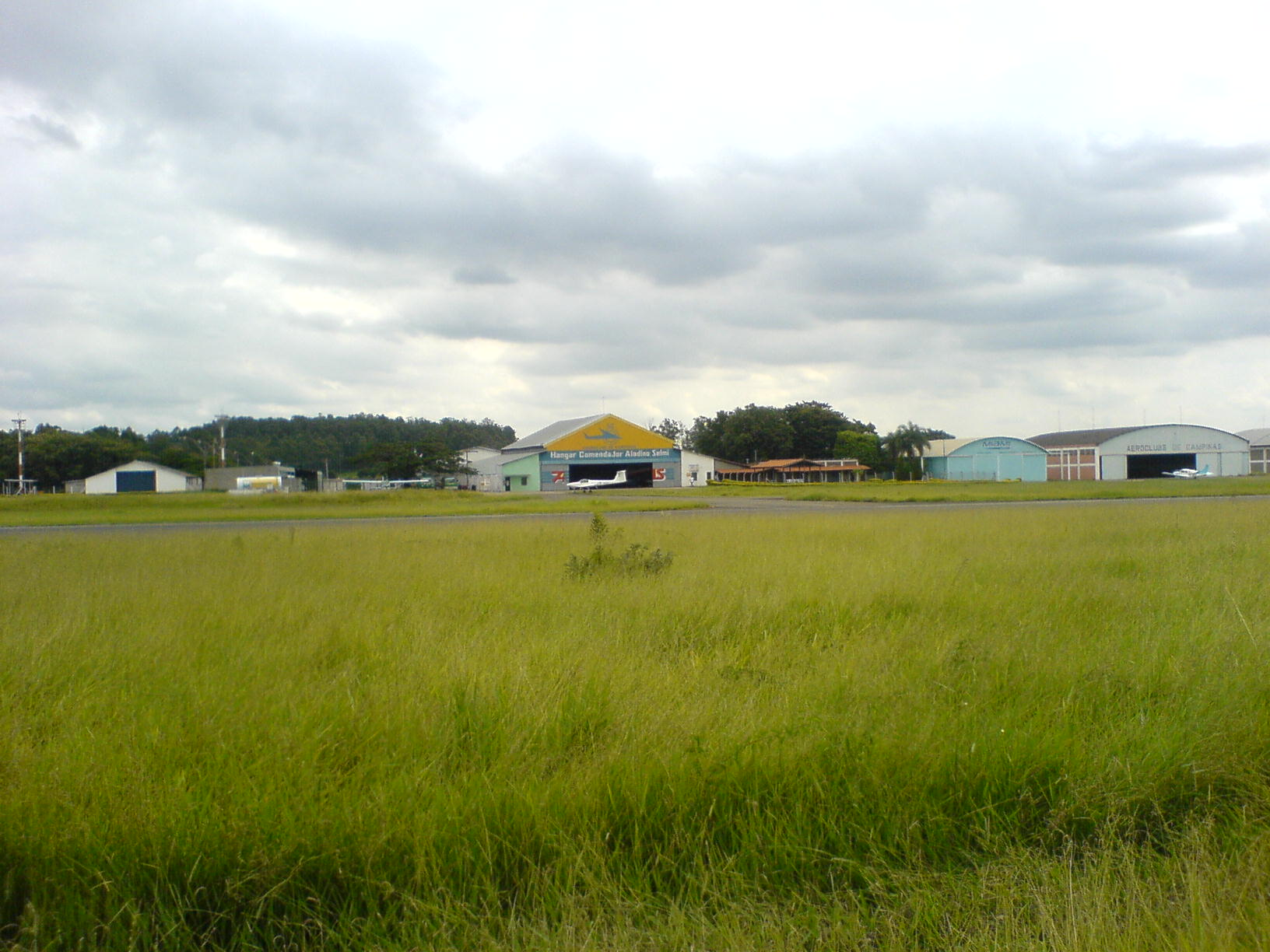
- IATA: CPQ; ICAO: SDAM; LID: SP0037

Summary
- Airport type: Public
- Operator: DAESP (?–2019); Rede Voa (2019–present)
- Serves: Campinas
- Time zone: BRT (UTC−03:00)
- Elevation AMSL: 612 m (2,008 ft)
- Coordinates: 22°51′33″S 047°06′29″W
- Website: www.voa-sp.com.br/aeroporto/aeroporto-estadual-campo-do-amarais-prefeito-francisco-amaral/

Map
- Location of the airport in Brazil CPQ (Brazil)

Runways
Direction	Length		Surface
Direction	m	ft	Surface
16/34	1,650	5,413	Asphalt

Statistics (2015)
- Passengers: 39,753 ▲18%
- Aircraft Operations: 49,385 ▼16%
- Metric tonnes of cargo: 0
- Statistics: DAESP; Sources: Airport Website, ANAC, DECEA

Campo dos Amarais–Prefeito Francisco Amaral State Airport (IATA: CPQ, ICAO: SDAM), also known as Amarais Airport, is an airport serving Campinas, Brazil.

It is operated by Rede Voa.

== History ==
On March 15, 2017 Voa São Paulo was granted by the government of the State of São Paulo the concession to operate this facility, previously operated by DAESP.

== Access ==
The airport is located 8 km (5 mi) from downtown Campinas.

== See also ==
- List of airports in Brazil
