= Ubatuba Airport =

Gastão Madeira State Airport Aeroporto Estadual Gastão Madeira
- IATA: UBT; ICAO: SDUB; LID: SP0065

Summary
- Airport type: Public
- Operator: DAESP (?–2019); Rede Voa (2019–present)
- Serves: Ubatuba
- Time zone: BRT (UTC−03:00)
- Elevation AMSL: 3 m (9.8 ft)
- Coordinates: 23°26′29″S 045°04′34″W
- Website: www.voa-sp.com.br/aeroporto/aeroporto-estadual-gastao-madeira/

Map
- Location in Brazil UBT (Brazil)

Runways
Direction	Length		Surface
Direction	m	ft	Surface
09/27	940	3,084	Asphalt
- Sources: Airport Website, ANAC, DECEA

Gastão Madeira State Airport (IATA: UBT, ICAO: SDUB) is the airport serving Ubatuba, Brazil.

It is operated by Rede Voa.

== History ==
On March 15, 2017 Voa São Paulo was granted by the government of the State of São Paulo the concession to operate this facility, previously operated by DAESP.

== Accidents and incidents ==
- 9 January 2025: a private Cessna 525 Citation CJ1, registration PR-GFS, overshot runway 09 upon landing, crossed a road and broke up on a beach, bursting into flames. The pilot was killed, 4 occupants were rescued alive and three persons on the ground were also treated for injuries.

== Access ==
The airport is located 1 km (1 mi) from downtown Ubatuba.

== See also ==
- List of airports in Brazil
