= São José do Rio Preto Airport =

São José do Rio Preto–Prof. Eribelto Manoel Reino State Airport Aeroporto Estadual de São José do Rio Preto–Prof. Eribelto Manoel Reino
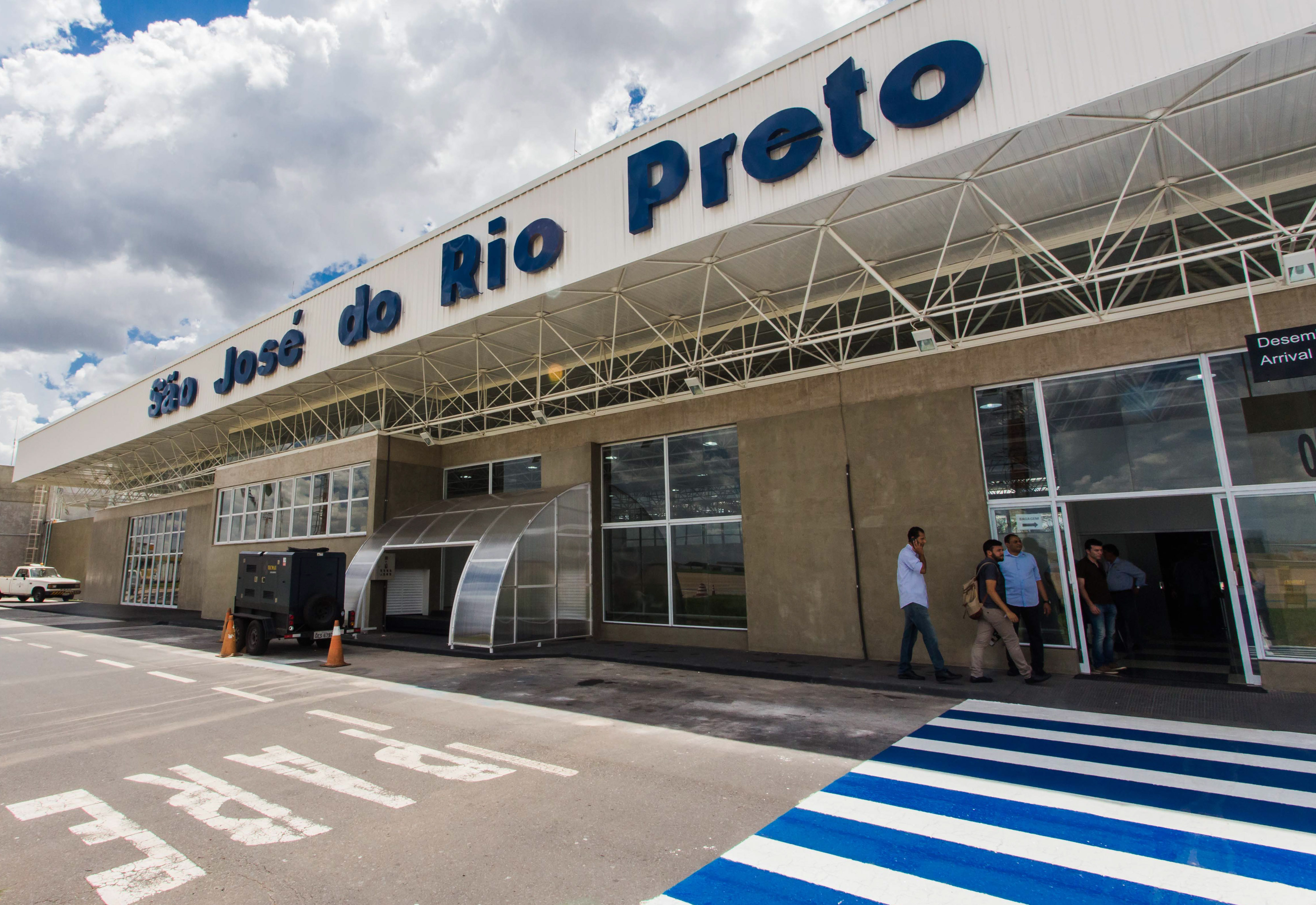
- IATA: SJP; ICAO: SBSR; LID: SP0006

Summary
- Airport type: Public
- Operator: DAESP (?–2021); ASP (2021–present)
- Serves: São José do Rio Preto
- Time zone: BRT (UTC−03:00)
- Elevation AMSL: 544 m (1,785 ft)
- Coordinates: 20°49′02″S 049°24′25″W

Map
- Location in Brazil SJP (Brazil)

Runways
Direction	Length		Surface
Direction	m	ft	Surface
07/25	1,640	5,381	Asphalt

Statistics (2019)
- Passengers: 816,016 ▲4%
- Aircraft Operations: 20,429 ▼23%
- Statistics: DAESP; Sources: Airport Website, ANAC, DECEA

São José do Rio Preto–Prof. Eribelto Manoel Reino State Airport (IATA: SJP, ICAO: SBSR) is the airport serving São José do Rio Preto, Brazil.

It was named in honor of Eribelto Manoel Reino (1941–1987), a prominent local lawyer, accountant, economist and politician.

It is operated by ASP (Aeroportos Paulistas).

== History ==
The airport's operation was transferred to the ASP (Aeroportos Paulistas) consortium, a joint venture between Socicam and Dix companies, following a concession auction held on July 15, 2021. Prior to that, the airport was managed by DAESP.

== Airlines and destinations ==
Airlines	Destinations
Azul Brazilian Airlines	Belo Horizonte–Confins, Campinas, Cuiabá, Porto Seguro; Seasonal: Fortaleza, João Pessoa, Maceió, Natal, Recife
Gol Linhas Aéreas	São Paulo–Congonhas
LATAM Brasil	Brasília, São Paulo–Congonhas, São Paulo–Guarulhos

== Access ==
The airport is located 3 km (2 mi) from downtown São José do Rio Preto.

== See also ==
- List of airports in Brazil
