= Guaratinguetá Airport =

Edu Chaves Airport Aeroporto Edu Chaves
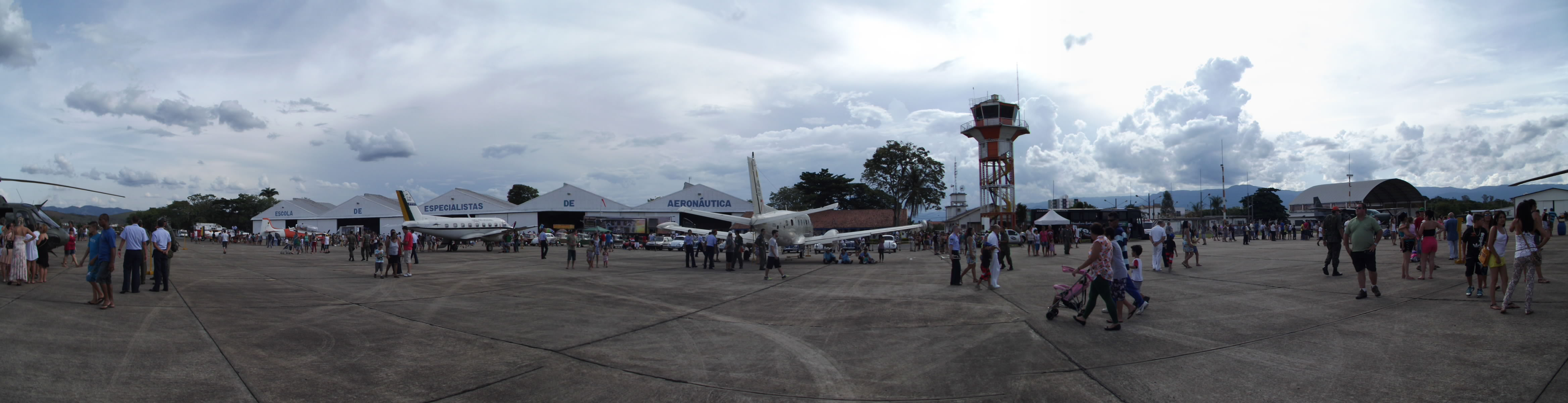
- IATA: GUJ; ICAO: SBGW; LID: SP0076

Summary
- Airport type: Public
- Operator: DAESP (2020–2021); Rede Voa (2021–present)
- Serves: Guaratinguetá
- Opened: 15 July 1940; 86 years ago
- Time zone: BRT (UTC−03:00)
- Elevation AMSL: 537 m (1,762 ft)
- Coordinates: 22°47′30″S 045°12′16″W
- Website: www.voa-sp.com.br/aeroporto/aeroporto-estadual-guaratingueta/

Map
- Location in Brazil GUJ (Brazil)

Runways
Direction	Length		Surface
Direction	m	ft	Surface
02/20	1,551	5,089	Asphalt
- Sources: Airport Website, ANAC, DECEA

Edu Chaves Airport (IATA: GUJ, ICAO: SBGW) is the airport serving Guaratinguetá, Brazil.

The airport is named after Eduardo Pacheco e Chaves (1887–1975), who was the first Brazilian pilot to fly in Brazil on March 8, 1912 in Santos. He also founded the first school of aviation in Brazil.

It is operated by Rede Voa.

Some of its facilities are used by the School of Aeronautics Specialists of the Brazilian Air Force.

== History ==
On February 19, 2020 the administration of the airport was handed over to DAESP.

On July 15, 2021 the concession of the airport was auctioned to Rede Voa, under the name Consórcio Voa NW e Voa SE. The airport was previously operated by DAESP.

== Access ==
The airport is located 3 km (2 mi) from downtown Guaratinguetá.

== See also ==
- List of airports in Brazil
