= Leite Lopes Airport =

Airport serving Ribeirão Preto, Brazil

Dr. Leite Lopes State Airport Aeroporto Estadual Dr. Leite Lopes
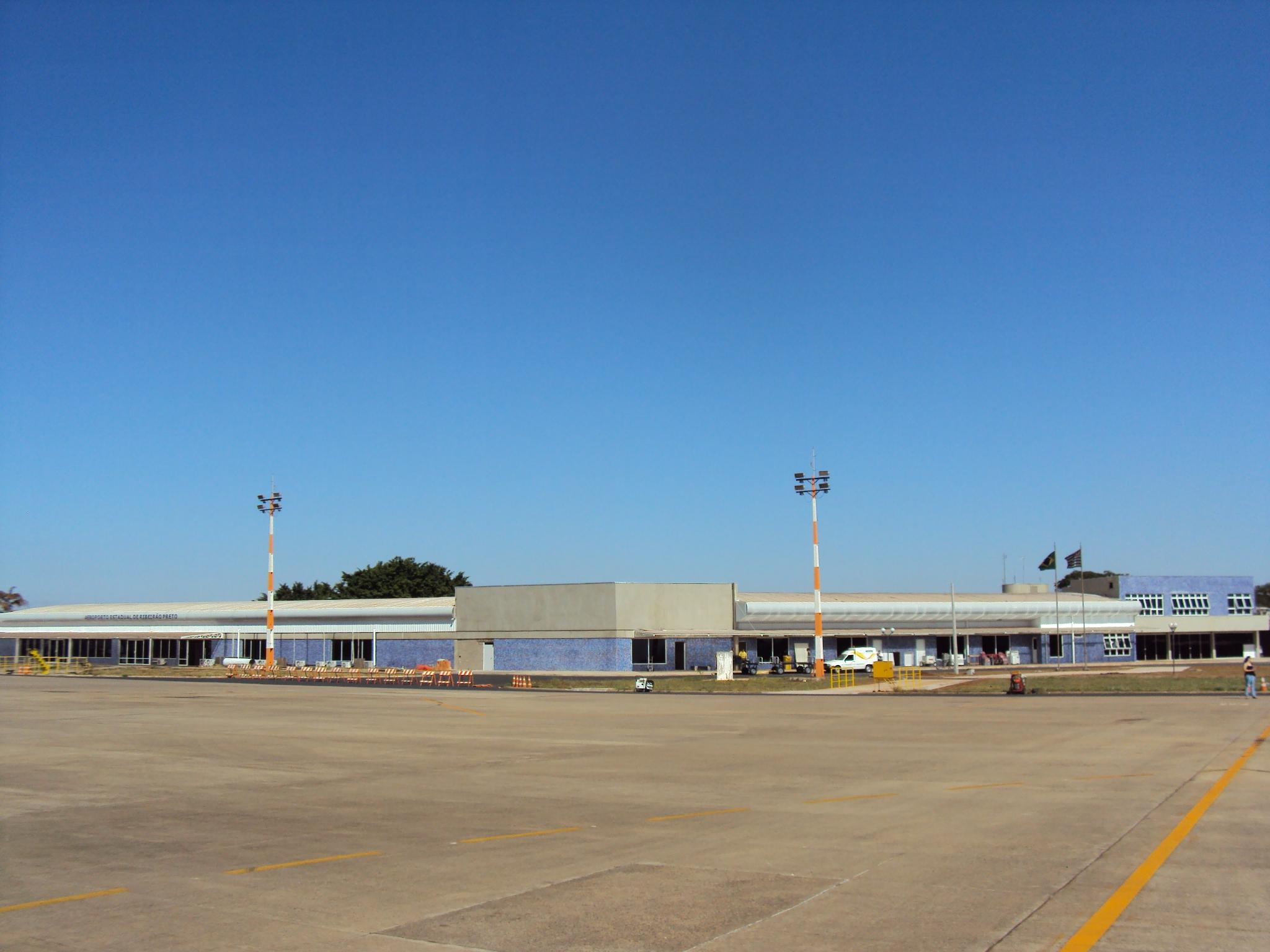
- IATA: RAO; ICAO: SBRP; LID: SP0004

Summary
- Airport type: Public
- Operator: DAESP (?–2021); Rede Voa (2021–present)
- Serves: Ribeirão Preto
- Opened: April 2, 1939; 87 years ago
- Time zone: BRT (UTC−03:00)
- Elevation AMSL: 550 m (1,800 ft)
- Coordinates: 21°08′11″S 047°46′36″W
- Website: redevoa.com.br/nossos-aeroportos/aeroporto-estadual-doutor-leite-lopes/

Map
- Location in Brazil RAO (Brazil)

Runways
Direction	Length		Surface
Direction	m	ft	Surface
18/36	2,100	6,890	Asphalt

Statistics (2019)
- Passengers: 923,617 ▲20%
- Aircraft Operations: 34,929 ▲15%
- Statistics: DAESP; Sources: Airport Website, ANAC, DECEA

Dr. Leite Lopes State Airport (IATA: RAO, ICAO: SBRP) is an airport serving Ribeirão Preto, Brazil. Since December 11, 1956 it is named after José Leite Lopes (1918–2006), a Brazilian scientist.

It is operated by Rede Voa.

== History ==
Dr. Leite Lopes State Airport was opened on April 2, 1939, and soon after, in 1940, the runway was extended for the first time.

In 1996 the whole airport complex received its major renovation in which the runway and adjoining taxiway were extended from 1,800m to 2,100m and a new larger apron was built.

In 2006 the width of the runway was enlarged to 45m and finally in July 2010 the renovation and enlargement of the terminal building was completed.

On July 15, 2021 the concession of the airport was auctioned to Rede Voa under the name Consórcio Voa NW e Voa SE. The airport was previously operated by DAESP.

== Airlines and destinations ==
Airlines	Destinations
Azul Brazilian Airlines	Belo Horizonte–Confins, Campinas, Porto Seguro; Seasonal: Fortaleza, João Pessoa, Maceió, Natal, Recife, Salvador da Bahia
Gol Linhas Aéreas	São Paulo–Congonhas (ends 26 January 2027), São Paulo–Guarulhos (ends 21 January 2027)
LATAM Brasil	Brasília (begins 22 February 2027), São Paulo–Congonhas, São Paulo–Guarulhos

== Access ==
The airport is located 10 km (6 mi) from downtown Ribeirão Preto.

== See also ==
- List of airports in Brazil
