= Tupã Airport =

José Vicente Faria Lima State Airport Aeroporto Estadual José Vicente Faria Lima
- IATA: none; ICAO: SDTP; LID: SP0025

Summary
- Airport type: Public
- Operator: DAESP (?–2021); ASP (2021–present)
- Serves: Tupã
- Time zone: BRT (UTC−03:00)
- Elevation AMSL: 550 m (1,800 ft)
- Coordinates: 21°53′24″S 050°30′21″W
- Website: aeroportospaulistas.com.br/tupa/

Map
- Location in Brazil SDTP (Brazil)

Runways
Direction	Length		Surface
Direction	m	ft	Surface
06/24	1,500	4,921	Asphalt
- Sources: Airport Website, ANAC, DECEA

José Vicente Faria Lima State Airport (ICAO: SDTP) is the airport serving Tupã, Brazil.

It is operated by ASP.

== History ==
On July 15, 2021, the concession of the airport was auctioned to the Aeroportos Paulista Consortium (ASP), comprised by companies Socicam and Dix. The airport was previously operated by DAESP.

== Access ==
The airport is located 7 km (4 mi) from downtown Tupã.

== See also ==
- List of airports in Brazil
