= Presidente Epitácio Airport =

Geraldo Moacir Bordon State Airport Aeroporto Estadual Geraldo Moacir Bordon
- IATA: none; ICAO: SDEP; LID: SP0052

Summary
- Airport type: Public
- Operator: DAESP (?–2021); ASP (2021–present)
- Serves: Presidente Epitácio
- Time zone: BRT (UTC−03:00)
- Elevation AMSL: 297 m (974 ft)
- Coordinates: 21°46′30″S 052°08′37″W
- Website: aeroportospaulistas.com.br/presidente-epitacio/

Map
- Location in Brazil SDEP (Brazil)

Runways
Direction	Length		Surface
Direction	m	ft	Surface
06/24	1,345	4,413	Asphalt
- Sources: Airport Website, ANAC, DECEA

Geraldo Moacir Bordon State Airport (ICAO: SDEP) is the airport serving Presidente Epitácio, Brazil.

It is operated by ASP.

== History ==
On July 15, 2021, the concession of the airport was auctioned to the Aeroportos Paulista Consortium (ASP), comprised by companies Socicam and Dix. The airport was previously operated by DAESP.

== Access ==
The airport is located 8 km (5 mi) from downtown Presidente Epitácio.

== See also ==
- List of airports in Brazil
