= Sorocaba Airport =

Bertram Luiz Leupolz State Airport Aeroporto Estadual Bertram Luiz Leupolz
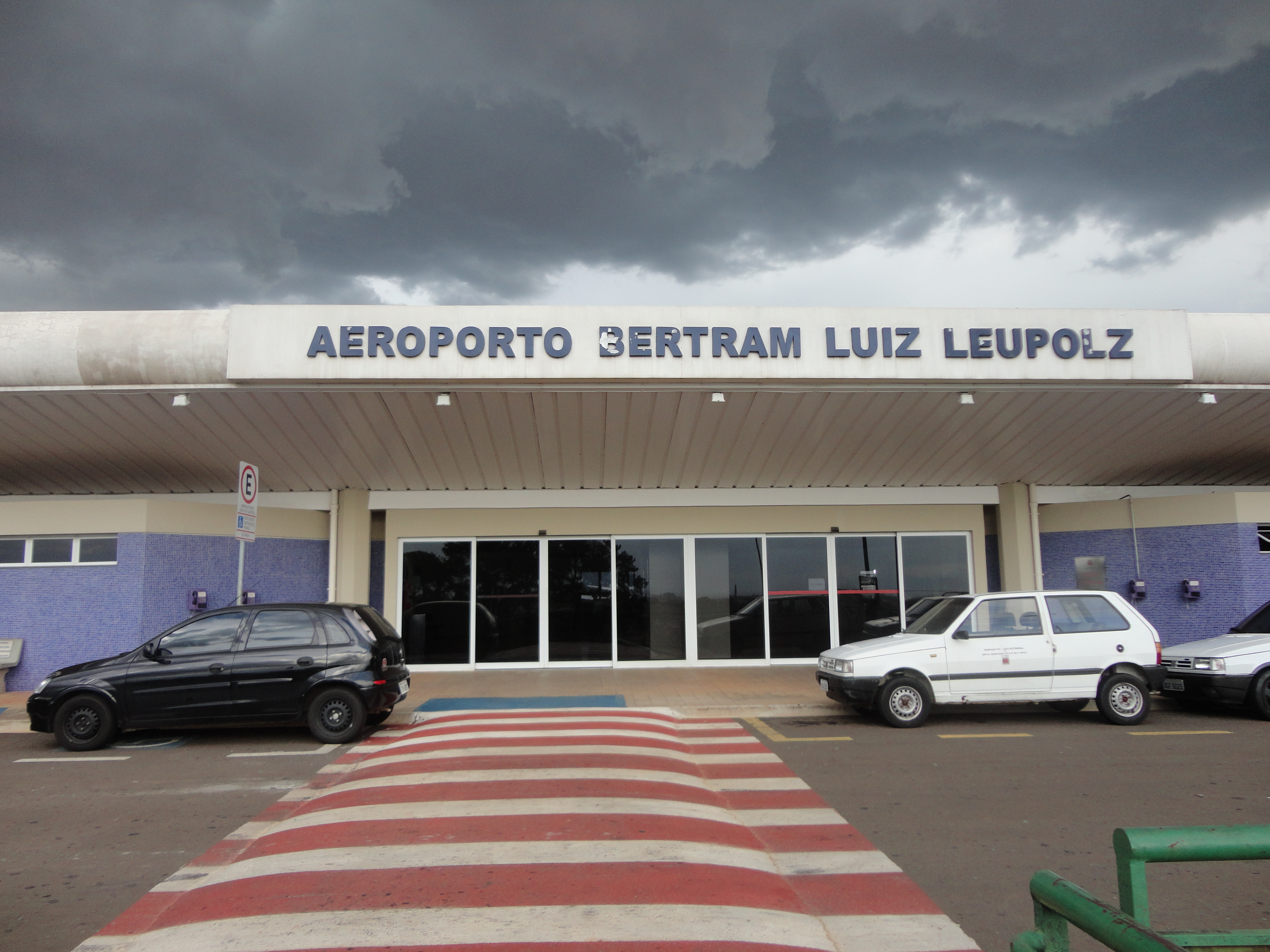
- IATA: SOD; ICAO: SDCO; LID: SP0027

Summary
- Airport type: Public
- Operator: DAESP (?–2021); Rede Voa (2021–present)
- Serves: Sorocaba
- Time zone: BRT (UTC−03:00)
- Elevation AMSL: 635 m (2,083 ft)
- Coordinates: 23°28′40″S 047°29′24″W
- Website: www.voa-sp.com.br/aeroporto/aeroporto-estadual-bertram-luiz-leupolz/

Map
- Location in Brazil SOD (Brazil)

Runways
Direction	Length		Surface
Direction	m	ft	Surface
01/19	1,630	5,348	Asphalt

Statistics (2019)
- Passengers: 43,627 ▲48%
- Aircraft Operations: 28,324 ▲12%
- Statistics: DAESP; Sources: Airport Website, ANAC, DECEA

Bertram Luiz Leupolz Airport (IATA: SOD, ICAO: SDCO) is the airport serving Sorocaba, Brazil.

It is operated by Rede Voa.

== History ==
The airport was commissioned in 1942.

On March 5, 2012, the government of São Paulo state announced the concession of an area of the airport to Embraer. The latter plans to build and develop a service center of executive aviation in the new facility. Embraer considers the airport an ideal location because it is located only 90 km away from São Paulo downtown.

On July 15, 2021 the concession of the airport was auctioned to Rede Voa, under the name Consórcio Voa NW e Voa SE. The airport was previously operated by DAESP.

== Accidents and incidents ==
- 23 July 2003: a Água Limpa Transportes Ltda Cessna Citation II registration PT-LME carried out a visual approach to the airport. After landing the crew lost control of the aircraft, it overran the runway, went down a drop off and skidded into a street. The airplane collided with four houses and three vehicles and ended up in a small field. The pilot died.

== Access ==
The airport is located 5 km (3 mi) from downtown Sorocaba.

== See also ==
- List of airports in Brazil
