= Votuporanga Airport =

Domingos Pignatari State Airport Aeroporto Estadual Domingos Pignatari
- IATA: VOT; ICAO: SDVG; LID: SP0026

Summary
- Airport type: Public
- Operator: DAESP (?–2021); ASP (2021–present)
- Serves: Votuporanga
- Time zone: BRT (UTC−03:00)
- Elevation AMSL: 511 m (1,677 ft)
- Coordinates: 20°27′26″S 050°00′09″W
- Website: aeroportospaulistas.com.br/votuporanga/

Map
- Location in Brazil SDVG (Brazil)

Runways
Direction	Length		Surface
Direction	m	ft	Surface
05/23	1,500	4,921	Asphalt
- Sources: Airport Website, ANAC, DECEA

Domingos Pignatari State Airport (ICAO: SDVG) is the airport serving Votuporanga, Brazil.

It is operated by ASP.

== History ==
On 15 July 2021, the concession of the airport was auctioned to the Aeroportos Paulista Consortium (ASP), comprising companies Socicam and Dix. The airport was previously operated by DAESP.

== Access ==
The airport is located 6 km (4 mi) from downtown Votuporanga.

== See also ==
- List of airports in Brazil
