= Barretos Airport =

Barretos–Chafei Amsei State Airport Aeroporto Estadual de Barretos–Chafei Amsei
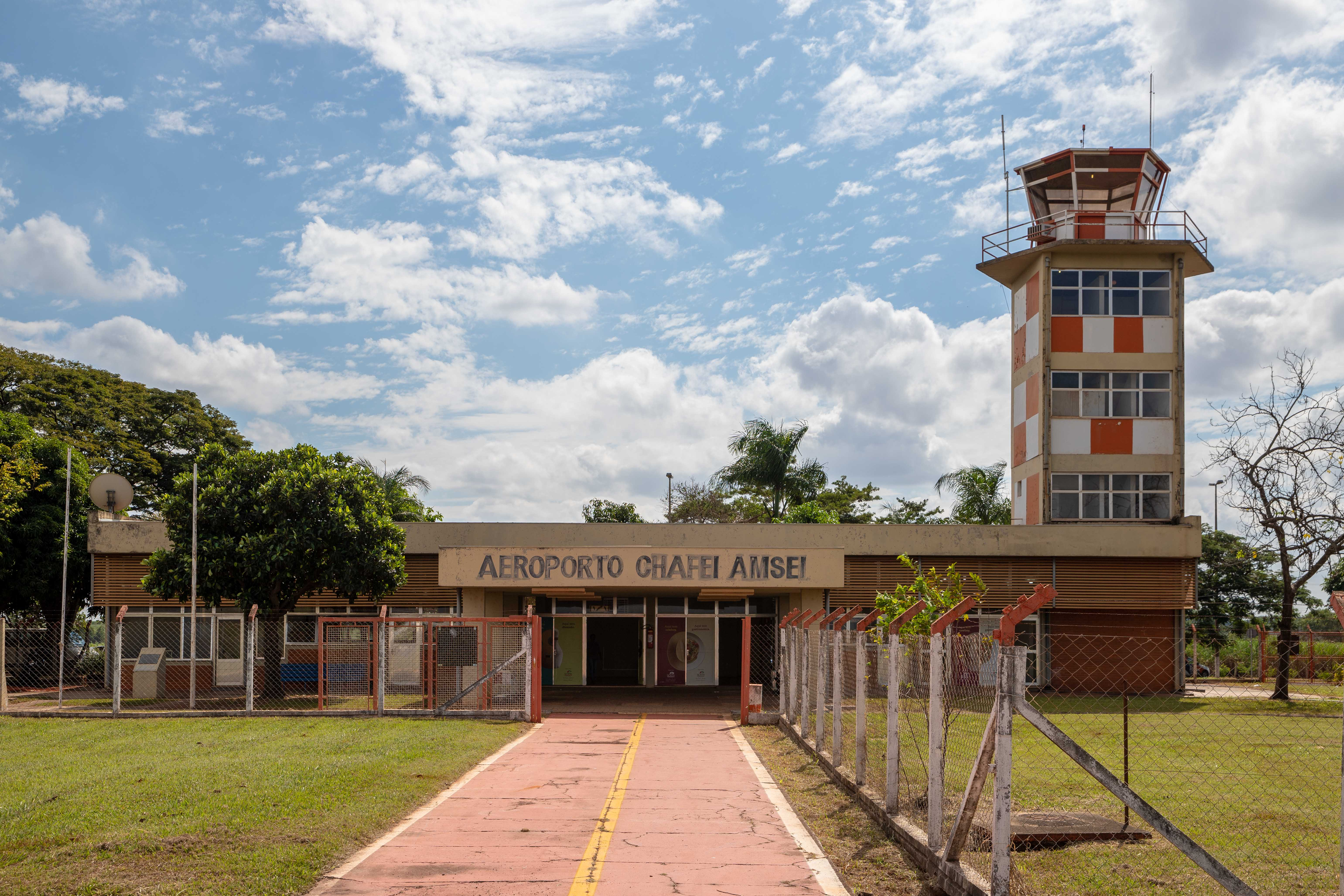
- IATA: BAT; ICAO: SNBA; LID: SP0013

Summary
- Airport type: Public
- Operator: DAESP (1981–2013); Barretos (2013–2019); DAESP (2019–2021); ASP (2021–present)
- Serves: Barretos
- Time zone: BRT (UTC−03:00)
- Elevation AMSL: 580 m (1,900 ft)
- Coordinates: 20°35′08″S 048°35′45″W

Map
- Location in Brazil BAT (Brazil)

Runways
Direction	Length		Surface
Direction	m	ft	Surface
08/26	1,800	5,906	Asphalt

Statistics (2012)
- Passengers: 4,130 ▲10%
- Aircraft Operations: 3,622 ▲36%
- Statistics: DAESP; Sources: Airport Website, ANAC, DECEA

Barretos–Chafei Amsei State Airport (IATA: BAT, ICAO: SNBA) is the airport serving Barretos, Brazil.

It is operated by ASP.

== History ==
On 11 July 2013 DAESP, transferred the administration of the airport to the Municipality of Barretos. However on 16 May 2019, the facility was transferred back to DAESP.

In 2013 a partnership was created between the airport administration and Barretos Cancer Hospital, the biggest in Latin America. This partnership is visible on a campaign requesting Brazilian airlines scheduled flights to Barretos, and it is centralized on the website Voo contra o câncer.

On 15 July 2021, the concession of the airport was auctioned to the Aeroportos Paulista Consortium (ASP), comprised by companies Socicam and Dix. The airport was previously operated by DAESP.

== Airlines and destinations ==
Airlines	Destinations
Azul Conecta	Campinas

== Access ==
The airport is located 4 km (2 mi) from downtown Barretos.

== See also ==
- List of airports in Brazil
