= Bauru-Arealva Airport =

Moussa Nakhl Tobias State Airport Aeroporto Estadual Moussa Nakhl Tobias
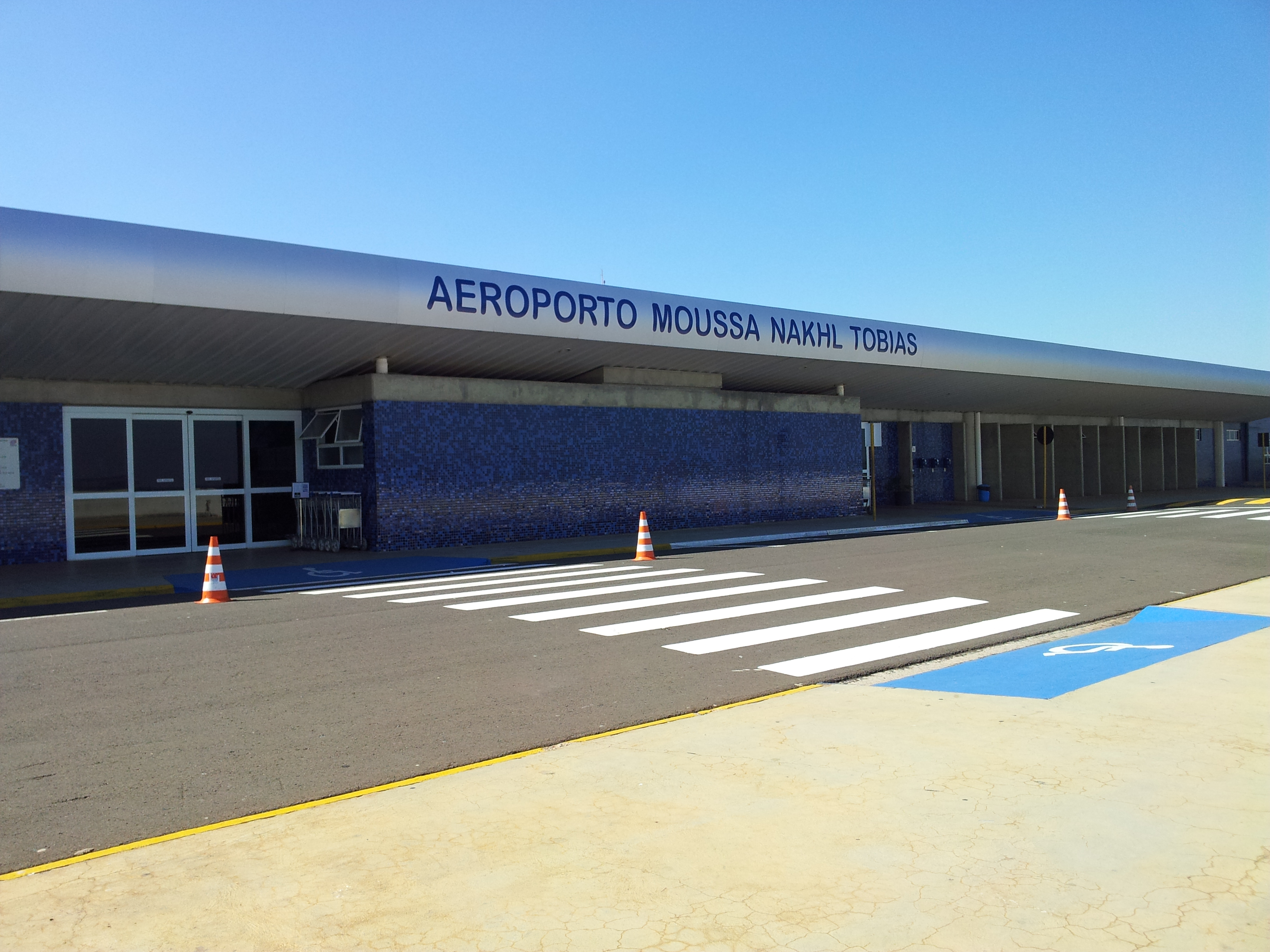
- IATA: JTC; ICAO: SBAE; LID: SP0010

Summary
- Airport type: Public
- Operator: DAESP (2006–2021); Rede Voa (2021–present)
- Serves: Bauru
- Location: Arealva, Brazil
- Opened: October 23, 2006
- Time zone: BRT (UTC−03:00)
- Elevation AMSL: 598 m (1,962 ft)
- Coordinates: 22°09′28″S 049°04′06″W
- Website: www.voa-sp.com.br/aeroporto/aeroporto-estadual-bauru/

Map
- Location in Brazil JTC (Brazil)

Runways
Direction	Length		Surface
Direction	m	ft	Surface
17/35	2,010	6,494	Asphalt

Statistics (2019)
- Passengers: 137,149 ▲69%
- Aircraft Operations: 7,237 ▲109%
- Statistics: DAESP; Sources: Airport Website, ANAC, DECEA

Moussa Nakhl Tobias State Airport (IATA: JTC, ICAO: SBAE), commonly known as Bauru–Arealva Airport is the main airport serving Bauru and Arealva, Brazil. It is named after the Lebanese businessman and vice-mayor Moussa Nakhl Tobias (1940-2003), who immigrated to Brazil in 1959 and established himself in Bauru.

It is operated by Rede Voa.

== History ==
The airport was built as a replacement to the older Comte. João Ribeiro de Barros Airport and opened on 23 October 2006, when all scheduled traffic was transferred to this new facility.

On July 15, 2021 the concession of the airport was auctioned to Rede Voa, under the name Consórcio Voa NW e Voa SE. The airport was previously operated by DAESP.

== Airlines and destinations ==
Airlines	Destinations
Azul Brazilian Airlines	Campinas; Seasonal: Maceió, Recife

== Access ==
The airport is located 18 km (11 mi) from downtown Bauru and 34 km (21 mi) from downtown Arealva, within the limits of the municipality of Arealva.

== See also ==
- List of airports in Brazil
