= São Manuel Airport =

Nelson Garófalo State Airport Aeroporto Estadual Nelson Garófalo
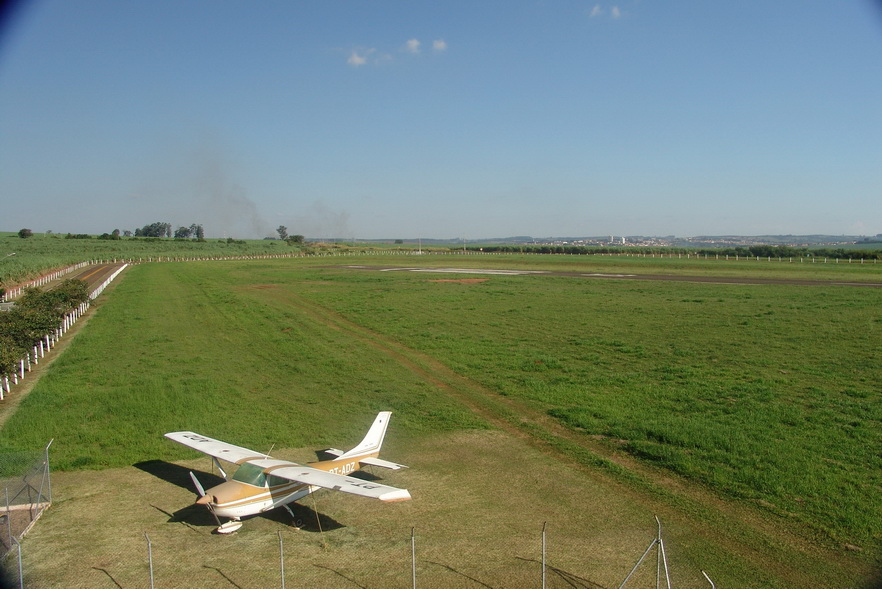
- IATA: none; ICAO: SDNO; LID: SP0061

Summary
- Airport type: Public
- Operator: DAESP (?–2021); Rede Voa (2021–present)
- Serves: São Manuel
- Time zone: BRT (UTC−03:00)
- Elevation AMSL: 734 m (2,408 ft)
- Coordinates: 22°41′46″S 048°34′34″W
- Website: www.voa-sp.com.br/aeroporto/aeroporto-estadual-nelson-garofalo/

Map
- Location in Brazil SDNO (Brazil)

Runways
Direction	Length		Surface
Direction	m	ft	Surface
14/32	1,000	3,281	Asphalt
- Sources: Airport Website, ANAC, DECEA

Nelson Garófalo State Airport (ICAO: SDNO) is the airport serving São Manuel, Brazil.

It is operated by Rede Voa.

== History ==
On July 15, 2021, the concession of the airport was auctioned to Rede Voa, under the name Consórcio Voa NW e Voa SE. The airport was previously operated by DAESP.

== Access ==
The airport is located 7 km (4 mi) from downtown São Manuel.

== See also ==
- List of airports in Brazil
