= Registro Airport =

Alberto Bertelli State Airport Aeroporto Estadual Alberto Bertelli
- IATA: none; ICAO: SSRG; LID: SP0030

Summary
- Airport type: Public
- Operator: DAESP (?–2021); Rede Voa (2021–present)
- Serves: Registro
- Time zone: BRT (UTC−03:00)
- Elevation AMSL: 25 m (82 ft)
- Coordinates: 24°31′54″S 047°50′25″W
- Website: www.voa-sp.com.br/aeroporto/aeroporto-estadual-alberto-bertelli/

Map
- Location in Brazil SSRG (Brazil)

Runways
Direction	Length		Surface
Direction	m	ft	Surface
11/29	1,500	4,921	Asphalt
- Sources: Airport Website, ANAC, DECEA

Alberto Bertelli State Airport (ICAO: SSRG) is the airport serving Registro, Brazil.

It is operated by Rede Voa.

== History ==
On July 15, 2021 the concession of the airport was auctioned to Rede Voa, under the name Consórcio Voa NW e Voa SE. The airport was previously operated by DAESP.

== Access ==
The airport is located 6 km (4 mi) from downtown Registro.

== See also ==
- List of airports in Brazil
