= Franca Airport =

Franca–Ten. Lund Presotto State Airport Aeroporto Estadual de Franca–Ten. Lund Presotto
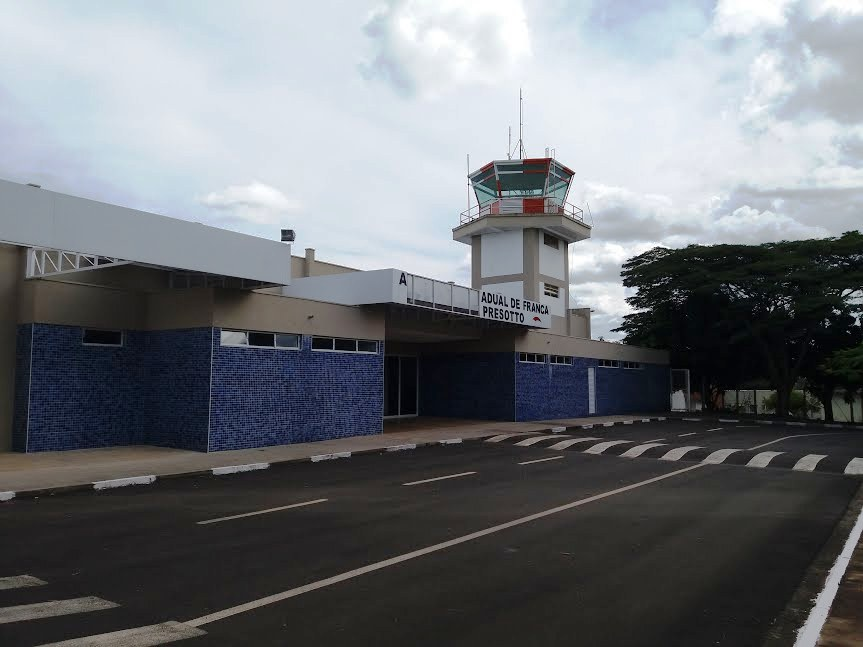
- Landside entry of the airport
- IATA: FRC; ICAO: SIMK; LID: SP0011

Summary
- Airport type: Public
- Operator: DAESP (?–2021); Rede Voa (2021–present)
- Serves: Franca
- Time zone: BRT (UTC−03:00)
- Elevation AMSL: 1,003 m (3,291 ft)
- Coordinates: 20°35′32″S 047°22′59″W
- Website: www.voa-sp.com.br/aeroporto/aeroporto-estadual-franca/

Map
- Location in Brazil FRC (Brazil)

Runways
Direction	Length		Surface
Direction	m	ft	Surface
06/24	2,000	6,562	Asphalt

Statistics (2019)
- Passengers: 3,111 ▲54%
- Aircraft Operations: 4,274 ▲98%
- Statistics: DAESP; Sources: Airport Website, ANAC, DECEA

Franca–Ten. Lund Presotto State Airport (IATA: FRC, ICAO: SIMK) is the airport serving Franca, Brazil.

== History ==
It was established as an aeroclub in 1939 and designated as an airport in 1977. On July 15, 2021, the airport’s concession was auctioned to Rede Voa, with DAESP retaining regulatory oversight. The transition to Rede Voa was completed on February 7, 2022.

== Airlines and destinations ==
Airlines	Destinations
Azul Conecta	Campinas

== Access ==
The airport is located 7 km (4 mi) from downtown Franca.

== See also ==
- List of airports in Brazil
