= Itanhaém Airport =

Antônio Ribeiro Nogueira Jr. State Airport Aeroporto Estadual Antônio Ribeiro Nogueira Jr.
- IATA: JTN; ICAO: SDIM; LID: SP0033

Summary
- Airport type: Public
- Operator: DAESP (?–2019); Rede Voa (2019–present)
- Serves: Itanhaém
- Time zone: BRT (UTC−03:00)
- Elevation AMSL: 4 m (13 ft)
- Coordinates: 24°09′53″S 046°47′08″W
- Website: www.voa-sp.com.br/aeroporto/aeroporto-estadual-antonio-ribeiro-nogueira-jr/

Map
- Location in Brazil JTN (Brazil)

Runways
Direction	Length		Surface
Direction	m	ft	Surface
15/33	1,350	4,429	Asphalt
- Sources: Airport Website, ANAC, DECEA

The Antônio Ribeiro Nogueira Jr. State Airport (IATA: JTN, ICAO: SDIM) is the airport serving Itanhaém, Brazil.

It is operated by Rede Voa.

== History ==
On 15 March 2017 Voa São Paulo was granted by the government of the State of São Paulo the concession to operate this facility, previously operated by DAESP.

== Access ==
The airport is located 4 km (2 mi) from downtown Itanhaém.

== See also ==
- List of airports in Brazil
