= SDDN =

SDDN may refer to:

- Andradina Airport, Brazil, by ICAO airport code
- Siddharthnagar railway station, Uttar Pradesh, India, by Indian Railways station code
