= Penápolis Airport =

Dr. Ramalho Franco State Airport Aeroporto Estadual Dr. Ramalho Franco
- IATA: none; ICAO: SDPN; LID: SP0024

Summary
- Airport type: Public
- Operator: DAESP (?–2021); ASP (2021–present)
- Serves: Penápolis
- Time zone: BRT (UTC−03:00)
- Elevation AMSL: 412 m (1,352 ft)
- Coordinates: 21°24′36″S 050°02′01″W
- Website: aeroportospaulistas.com.br/penapolis/

Map
- Location in Brazil SDPN (Brazil)

Runways
| Direction | Length | | Surface |
| Direction | m | ft | Surface |
|---|---|---|---|
| 15/33 | 1,500 | 4,921 | Asphalt |
- Sources: Airport Website, ANAC, DECEA

Dr. Ramalho Franco State Airport (ICAO: SDPN) is the airport serving Penápolis, Brazil.

It is operated by ASP.

== History ==
On July 15, 2021, the concession of the airport was auctioned to the Aeroportos Paulista Consortium (ASP), comprised by companies Socicam and Dix. The airport was previously operated by DAESP.

== Access ==
The airport is located 7 km (4 mi) from downtown Penápolis.

== See also ==
- List of airports in Brazil
