= OUS =

OUS may refer to:

- Ohio University Southern Campus
- Okayama University of Science
- Open University of Sudan
- Operation United Shield
- Oregon University System
- Organizational unit (computing)
- Ourinhos Airport
- Oxford Union Society

== See also ==
- Ous (name)
