= Presidente Prudente (disambiguation) =

Presidente Prudente is a city in Brazil.

Presidente Prudente may also refer to:

- Prudente de Morais e Barros (1841–1902), third President of Brazil (1894–1898)
- Presidente Prudente Airport
- Roman Catholic Diocese of Presidente Prudente
- Presidente Prudente Formation, a geological formation in São Paulo state, Brazil
