= Lins Airport =

Gov. Lucas Nogueira Garcez Airport Aeroporto Gov. Lucas Nogueira Garcez
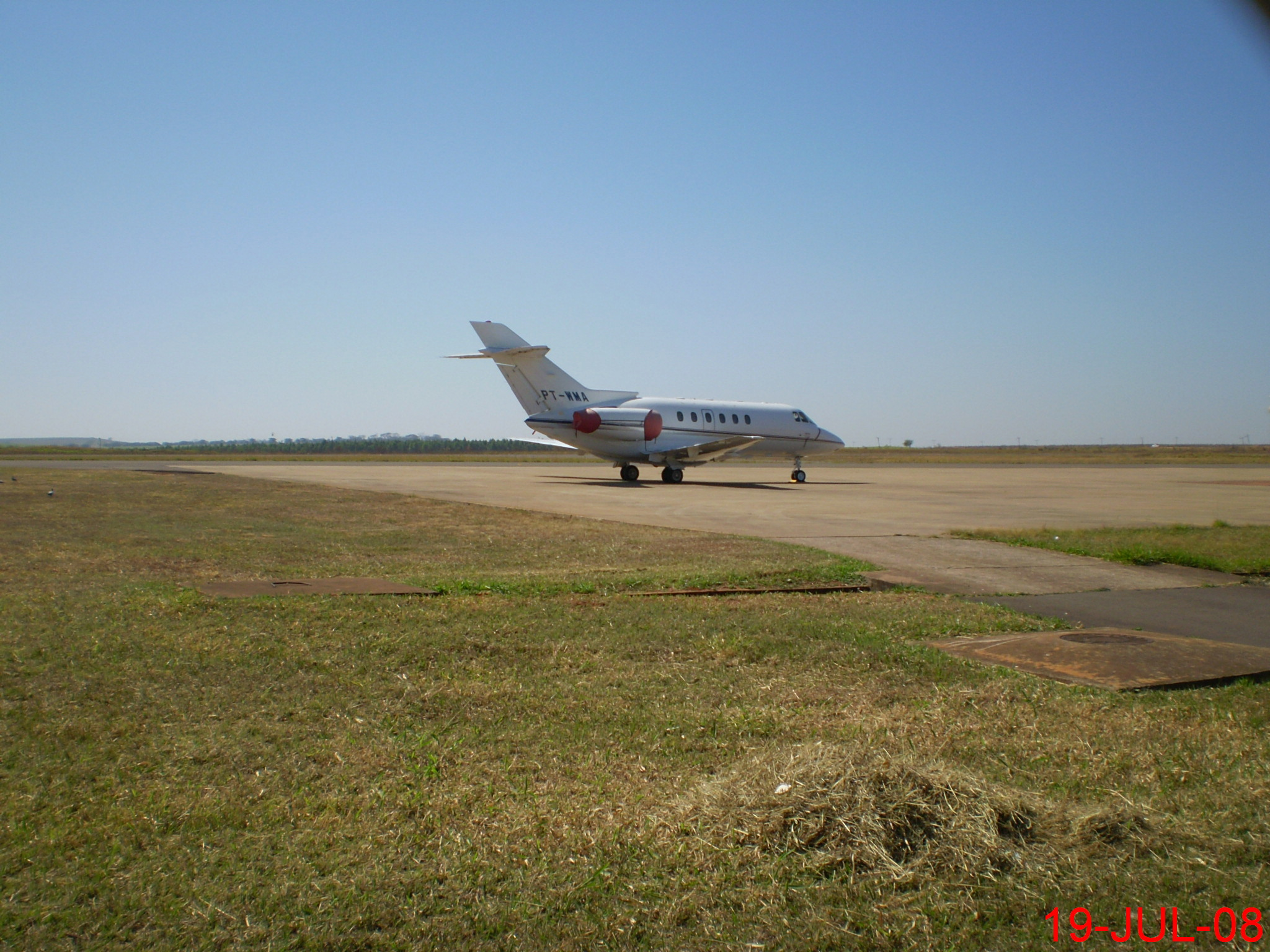
- IATA: LIP; ICAO: SWXQ; LID: SP0015

Summary
- Airport type: Public
- Operator: DAESP (?–2012); Lins (2012–present)
- Serves: Lins
- Time zone: BRT (UTC−03:00)
- Elevation AMSL: 480 m (1,570 ft)
- Coordinates: 21°39′46″S 049°43′52″W

Map
- Location in Brazil LIP (Brazil)

Runways
| Direction | Length | | Surface |
| Direction | m | ft | Surface |
|---|---|---|---|
| 14/32 | 1,700 | 5,577 | Asphalt |

Statistics (2012)
- Passengers: 3,582
- Aircraft Operations: 1,871
- Metric tonnes of cargo: 0
- Statistics: DAESP; Source: ANAC, DECEA

Gov. Lucas Nogueira Garcez Airport (IATA: LIP, ICAO: SWXQ) formerly SBLN, is the airport serving Lins, Brazil.

It is operated by the Municipality of Lins.

== History ==
In 2012 the administration of the airport was transferred to the Municipality of Lins. Previously it was administrated by DAESP.

== Access ==
The airport is located 2 km (1 mi) from downtown Lins.

== See also ==
- List of airports in Brazil
