= Araçatuba Airport =

Araçatuba–Dario Guarita State Airport Aeroporto Estadual de Araçatuba–Dario Guarita
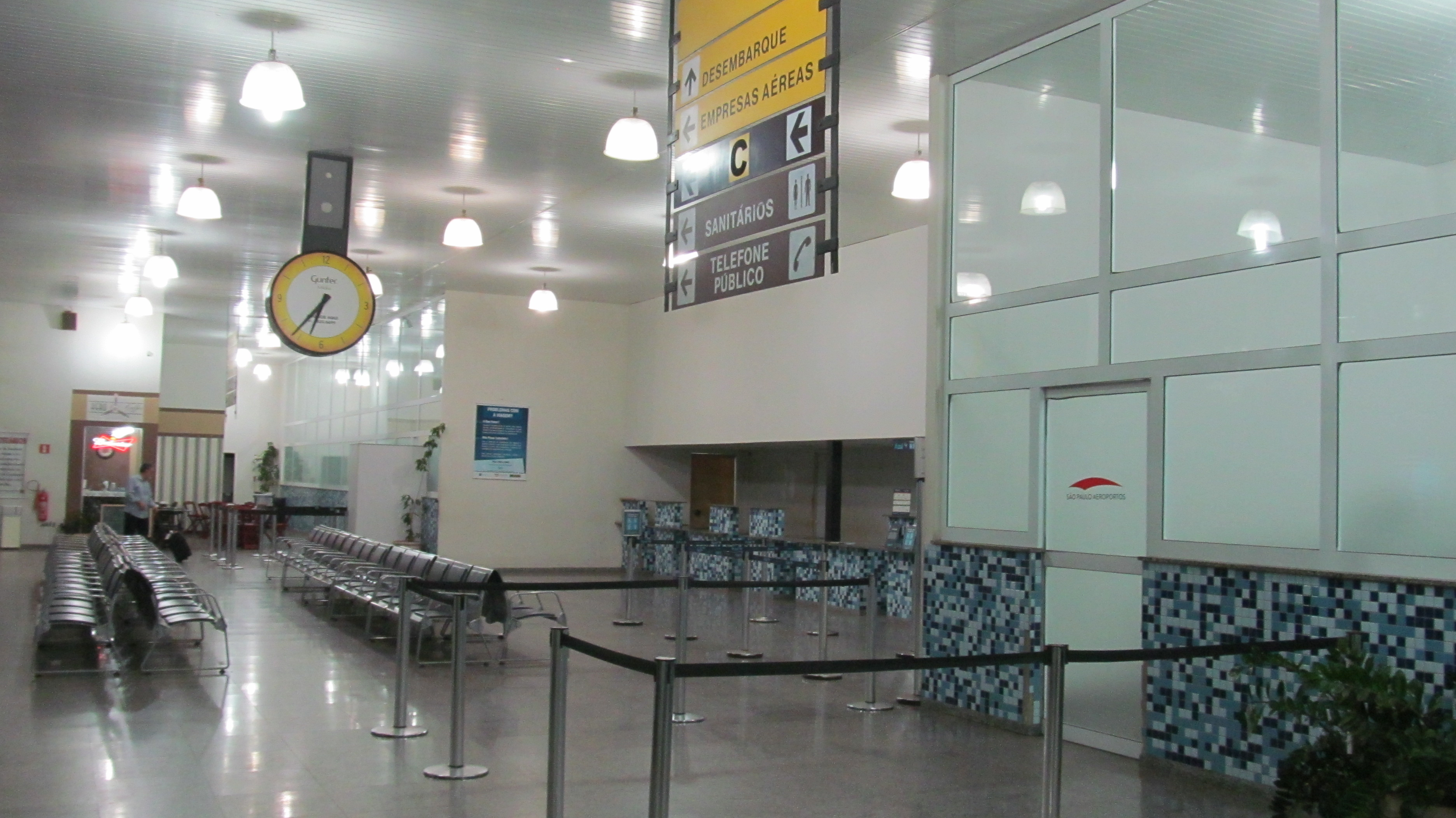
- IATA: ARU; ICAO: SBAU; LID: SP0009

Summary
- Airport type: Public
- Operator: DAESP (?–2021); ASP (2021–present)
- Serves: Araçatuba
- Time zone: BRT (UTC−03:00)
- Elevation AMSL: 414 m (1,358 ft)
- Coordinates: 21°08′39″S 050°25′35″W

Map
- Location in Brazil ARU (Brazil)

Runways
Direction	Length		Surface
Direction	m	ft	Surface
05/23	2,120	6,955	Asphalt

Statistics (2023)
- Passengers: 93,238 ▼7%
- Aircraft Operations: 10,423 ▼19%
- Statistics: ANAC DECEA

Araçatuba–Dario Guarita State Airport (IATA: ARU, ICAO: SBAU) is the airport serving Araçatuba, Brazil.

It is operated by ASP.

== History ==
Dario Guarita Airport was renovated in 1991.

On July 15, 2021, the concession of the airport was auctioned to the Aeroportos Paulista Consortium (ASP), comprised by companies Socicam and Dix. The airport was previously operated by DAESP.

== Airlines and destinations ==
Airlines	Destinations
Azul Brazilian Airlines	Campinas; Seasonal: Maceió
Gol Linhas Aéreas	São Paulo–Congonhas

== Accidents and incidents ==
- 7 October 1983: a TAM Airlines Embraer EMB 110C Bandeirante registration PP-SBH flying from Campo Grande and Urubupungá to Araçatuba struck the ground just short of the runway threshold after missing the approach at Araçatuba Airport twice. Seven crew and passengers died.

== Access ==
The airport is located 10 km (6 mi) from downtown Araçatuba.

== See also ==
- List of airports in Brazil
