= Ous (name) =

Ous is a given name. Notable people with the name include:

- Ous Ibrahim (born 1986), Iraqi footballer
- Oussama Mellouli (nicknamed “Ous”; born 1984), Tunisian swimmer and Olympic medalist

== See also ==
- OUS (disambiguation)
