= Rede Voa =

Brazilian airport administration consortium

- Type: Private company
- Industry: Aviation
- Headquarters: Jundiaí, Brazil
- Key people: Cel. Marcel Gomes Moure (CEO)
- Products: Airports administration
- Website: https://redevoa.com.br/

Rede Voa, previously known as Voa São Paulo or Voa-SP in short, is a private Brazilian airports administration consortium, responsible for sixteen Brazilian regional and municipal airports administrative operations.

On March 15, 2017 Voa São Paulo was granted the concession to operate five airports by the government of the State of São Paulo, previously operated by DAESP.

On July 15, 2021 eleven airports managed by DAESP had their concessions auctioned to Voa São Paulo, under the name Consórcio Voa SE.

== List of airports managed by Rede Voa ==
The following airports are managed by Rede Voa in 2022:

Added in 2019:

- Bragança Paulista – Arthur Siqueira State Airport
- Campinas – Campo dos Amarais–Pref. Francisco Amaral State Airport
- Itanhaém – Antônio Ribeiro Nogueira Jr. State Airport
- Jundiaí – Comte. Rolim Adolfo Amaro State Airport
- Ubatuba – Gastão Madeira State Airport

Added in 2021:

- Araraquara – Bartolomeu de Gusmão State Airport
- Avaré / Arandu – Comte. Luiz Gonzaga Luth Regional Airport
- Bauru / Arealva – Moussa Nakhl Tobias State Airport
- Franca – Ten. Lund Presotto State Airport
- Guaratinguetá – Edu Chaves Airport
- Marília – Frank Miloye Milenkovich State Airport
- Registro – Alberto Bertelli State Airport
- Ribeirão Preto – Dr. Leite Lopes State Airport
- São Carlos – Mário Pereira Lopes State Airport
- São Manuel – Nelson Garófalo Airport
- Sorocaba – Bertram Luiz Leupolz State Airport

== See also ==
- List of airports in Brazil
- List of the busiest airports in Brazil
