= Andradina Airport =

Paulino Ribeiro de Andrade State Airport Aeroporto Estadual Paulino Ribeiro de Andrade
- IATA: none; ICAO: SDDN; LID: SP0020

Summary
- Airport type: Public
- Operator: DAESP (?–2021); ASP (2021–present)
- Serves: Andradina
- Time zone: BRT (UTC−03:00)
- Elevation AMSL: 380 m (1,250 ft)
- Coordinates: 20°55′30″S 051°22′55″W
- Website: aeroportospaulistas.com.br/andradina/

Map
- Location in Brazil SDDN (Brazil)

Runways
Direction	Length		Surface
Direction	m	ft	Surface
11/29	1,500	4,921	Asphalt
- Sources: Airport Website, ANAC, DECEA

Paulino Ribeiro de Andrade State Airport (ICAO: SDDN) is the airport serving Andradina, Brazil.

It is operated by ASP.

== History ==
On July 15, 2021, the concession of the airport was auctioned to the Aeroportos Paulista Consortium (ASP), comprised by companies Socicam and Dix. The airport was previously operated by DAESP.

== Access ==
The airport is located 4 km (2 mi) from downtown Andradina.

== See also ==
- List of airports in Brazil
