= Jundiaí Airport =

Comte. Rolim Adolfo Amaro State Airport Aeroporto Estadual Comte. Rolim Adolfo Amaro
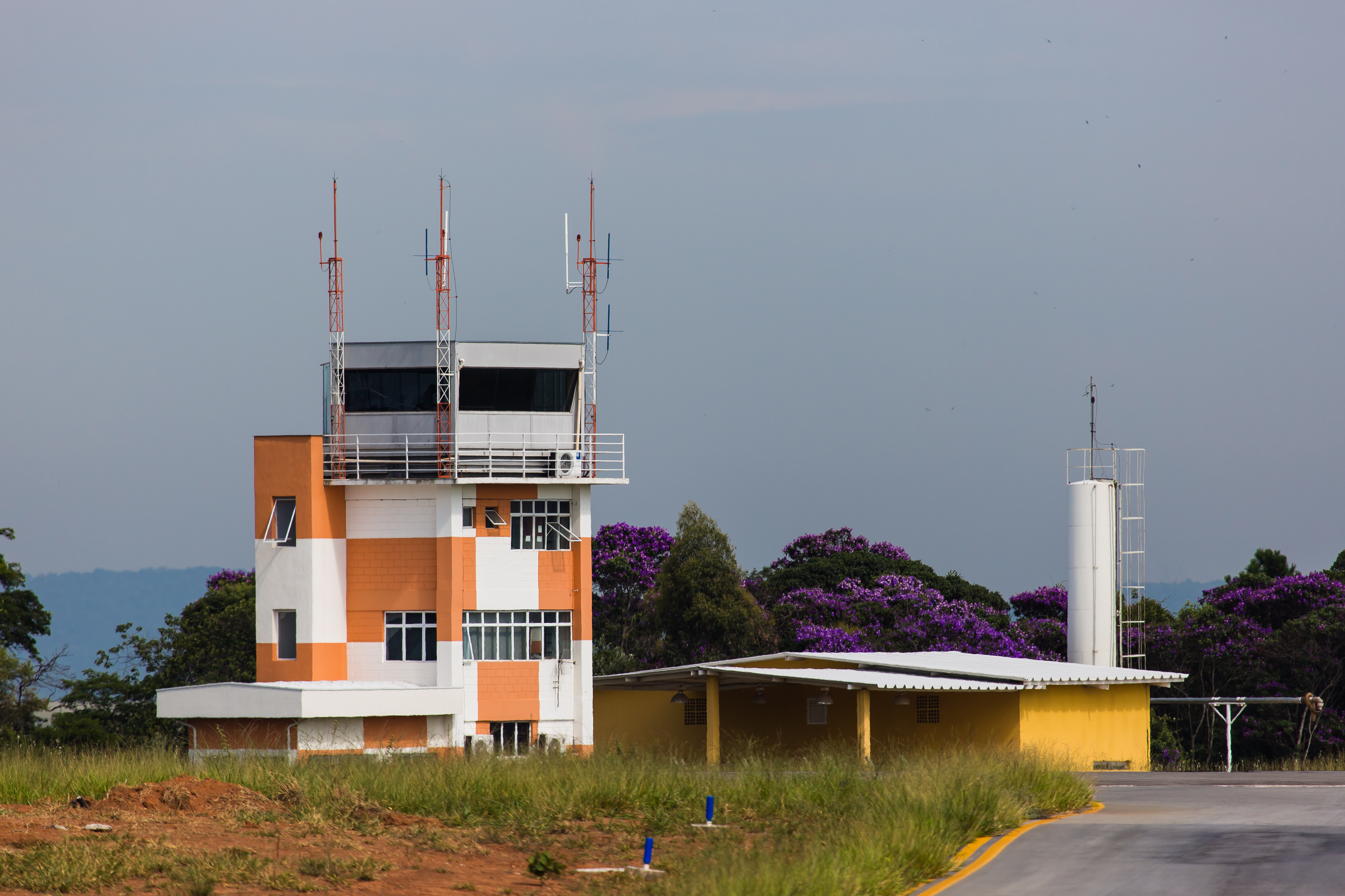
- IATA: QDV; ICAO: SBJD; LID: SP0031

Summary
- Airport type: Public
- Operator: DAESP (?–2019); Rede Voa (2019–present)
- Serves: Jundiaí
- Time zone: BRT (UTC−03:00)
- Elevation AMSL: 753 m (2,470 ft)
- Coordinates: 23°10′54″S 046°56′37″W
- Website: www.voa-sp.com.br/aeroporto/aeroporto-estadual-comandante-rolim-adolfo-amaro/

Map
- Location in Brazil QDV (Brazil)

Runways
Direction	Length		Surface
Direction	m	ft	Surface
18/36	1,400	4,594	Asphalt

Statistics (2015)
- Passengers: 11,674 ▼13%
- Aircraft Operations: 81,211 ▼6%
- Metric tonnes of cargo: 357 ▲68%
- Statistics: DAESP; Sources: Airport Website, ANAC, DECEA

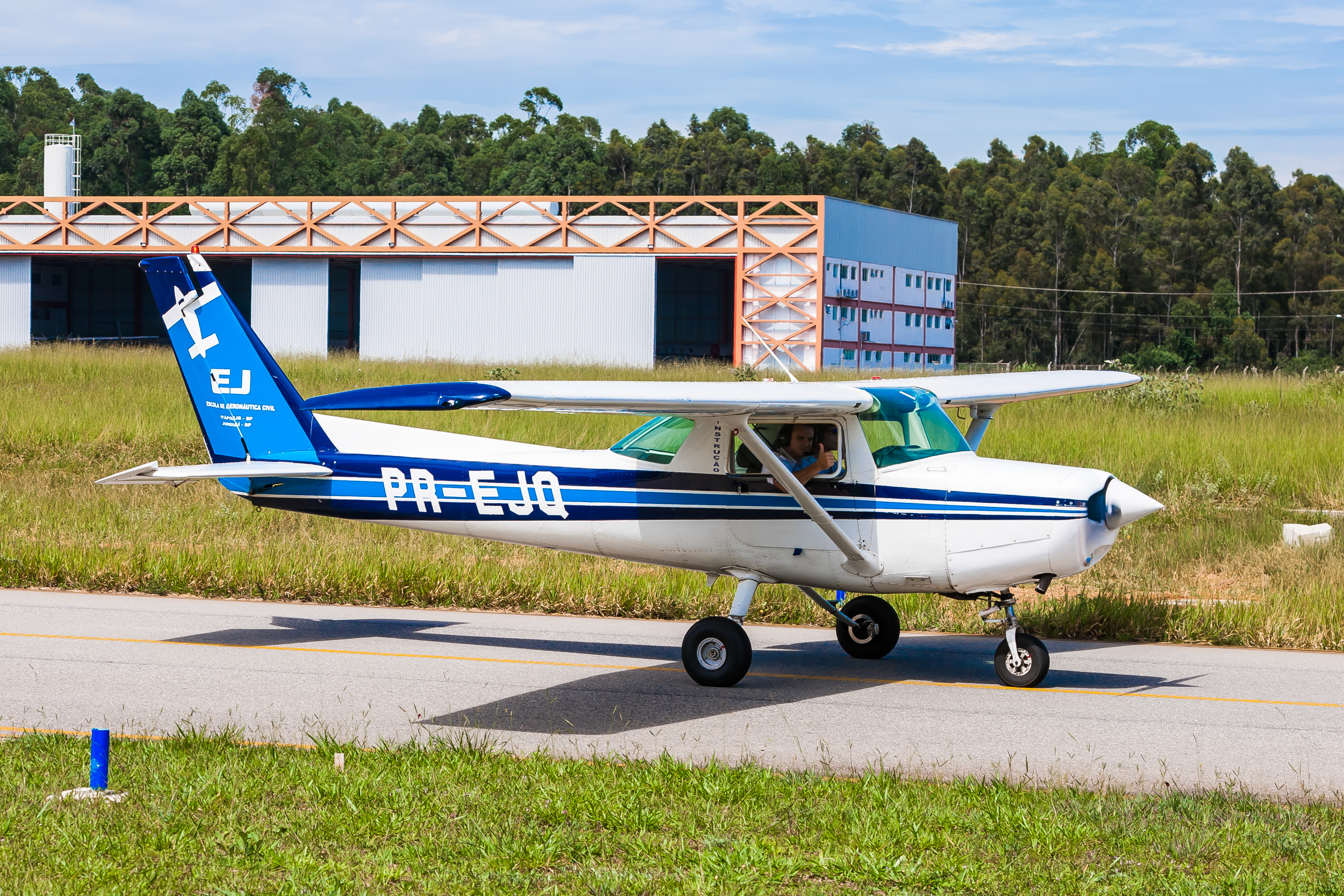
Training aircraft that belongs to a Brazilian Flight School operating in the Jundiaí Airport

Comte. Rolim Adolfo Amaro State Airport (IATA: QDV, ICAO: SBJD) formerly SDJD, is the airport serving Jundiaí, Brazil. It is named after Rolim Adolfo Amaro (1942–2001), founder and former president of LATAM Brasil formerly known as TAM Airlines.

It is operated by Rede Voa.

== History ==
The airport was commissioned in 1942 and it is dedicated to general aviation. In 2009 the airport was ranked 10th in terms of aircraft operations in Brazil, and in 2010 it remained amongst the busiest airports in the country due to its general aviation traffic, including executive aviation and aircraft maintenance facilities.

On 15 March 2017 Voa São Paulo was granted by the government of the State of São Paulo the concession to operate this facility, previously operated by DAESP.

Azul Conecta has its main maintenance base at the airport.

== Access ==
The airport is located 7 km (4 mi) from downtown Jundiaí.

== See also ==
- List of airports in Brazil
