= Assis Airport =

Assis–Marcelo Pires Halzhausen State Airport Aeroporto Estadual de Assis–Marcelo Pires Halzhausen
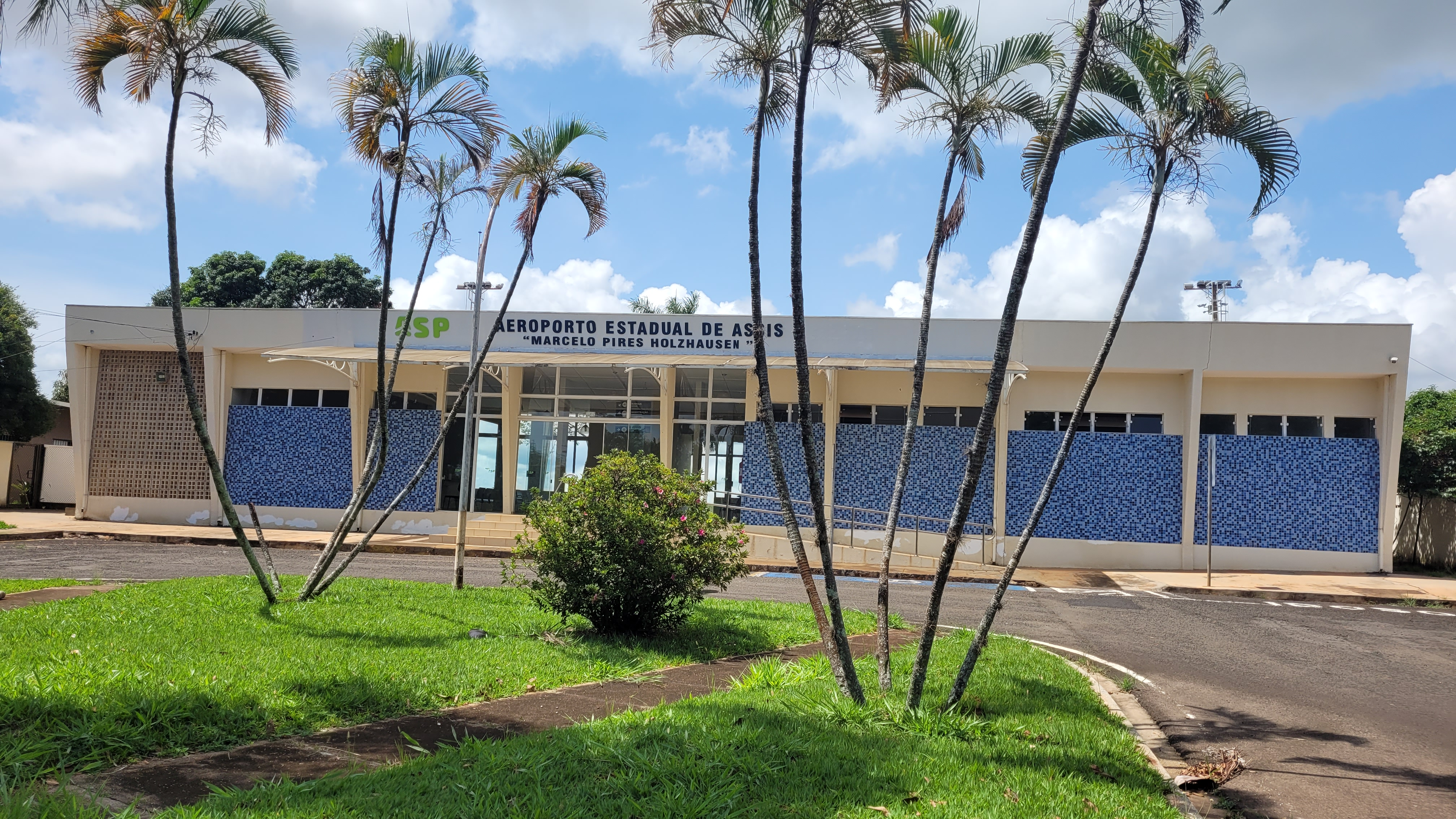
- IATA: AIF; ICAO: SNAX; LID: SP0016

Summary
- Airport type: Public
- Operator: DAESP (?–2021); ASP (2021–present)
- Serves: Assis
- Opened: 1967
- Time zone: BRT (UTC−03:00)
- Elevation AMSL: 564 m (1,850 ft)
- Coordinates: 22°38′19″S 050°27′21″W

Map
- Location in Brazil AIF (Brazil)

Runways
Direction	Length		Surface
Direction	m	ft	Surface
12/30	1,689	5,541	Asphalt

Statistics (2019)
- Passengers: 1,649 ▲4%
- Aircraft Operations: 1,860 ▲4%
- Statistics: DAESP; Sources: Airport Website, ANAC, DECEA

Assis–Marcelo Pires Halzhausen State Airport (IATA: AIF, ICAO: SNAX) is the airport serving Assis, Brazil.

It is operated by ASP.

== History ==
On July 15, 2021, the concession of the airport was auctioned to the Aeroportos Paulista Consortium (ASP), comprised by companies Socicam and Dix. The airport was previously operated by DAESP.

== Access ==
The airport is located 7 km (4 mi) from downtown Assis.

== See also ==
- List of airports in Brazil
