= Marília Airport =

Frank Miloye Milenkovich State Airport Aeroporto Estadual Frank Miloye Milenkovich
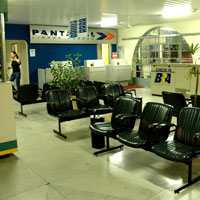
- IATA: MII; ICAO: SBML; LID: SP0014

Summary
- Airport type: Public
- Operator: DAESP (?–2021); Rede Voa (2021–present)
- Serves: Marília
- Time zone: BRT (UTC−03:00)
- Elevation AMSL: 650 m (2,130 ft)
- Coordinates: 22°11′49″S 049°55′35″W
- Website: www.voa-sp.com.br/aeroporto/aeroporto-estadual-marilia/

Map
- Location in Brazil MII (Brazil)

Runways
Direction	Length		Surface
Direction	m	ft	Surface
03/21	1,700	5,576	Asphalt

Statistics (2019)
- Passengers: 73,756 ▲26%
- Aircraft Operations: 5,644 ▼12%
- Statistics: DAESP; Sources: Airport Website, ANAC, DECEA

Frank Miloye Milenkovich State Airport (IATA: MII, ICAO: SBML) is the airport serving Marília, Brazil.

It is operated by Rede Voa.

== History ==
The airport was opened in 1938.

It was at this airport that on January 7, 1961 TAM – Táxi Aéreo Marília, the forerunner of TAM Airlines (rebranded LATAM Brasil) started its operations as a company specialized in general aviation.

On July 15, 2021, the concession of the airport was auctioned to Rede Voa, under the name Consórcio Voa NW e Voa SE. The airport was previously operated by DAESP.

== Airlines and destinations ==
Airlines	Destinations
Azul Brazilian Airlines	Campinas

== Access ==
The airport is located 3 km (2 mi) from downtown Marília.

== See also ==
- List of airports in Brazil
