= Tupã, São Paulo =

Tupã
- Municipality
- Municipality of Tupã
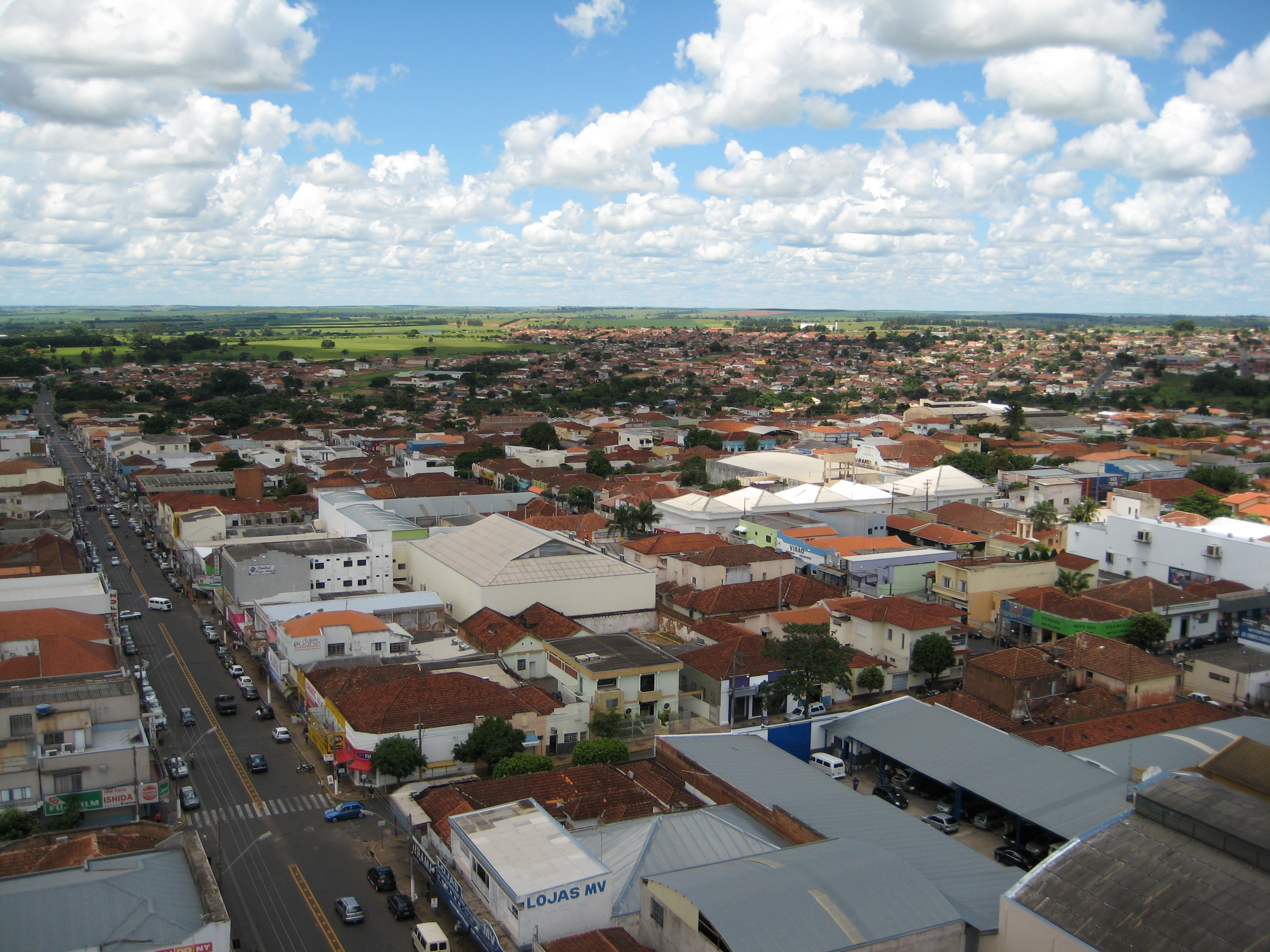
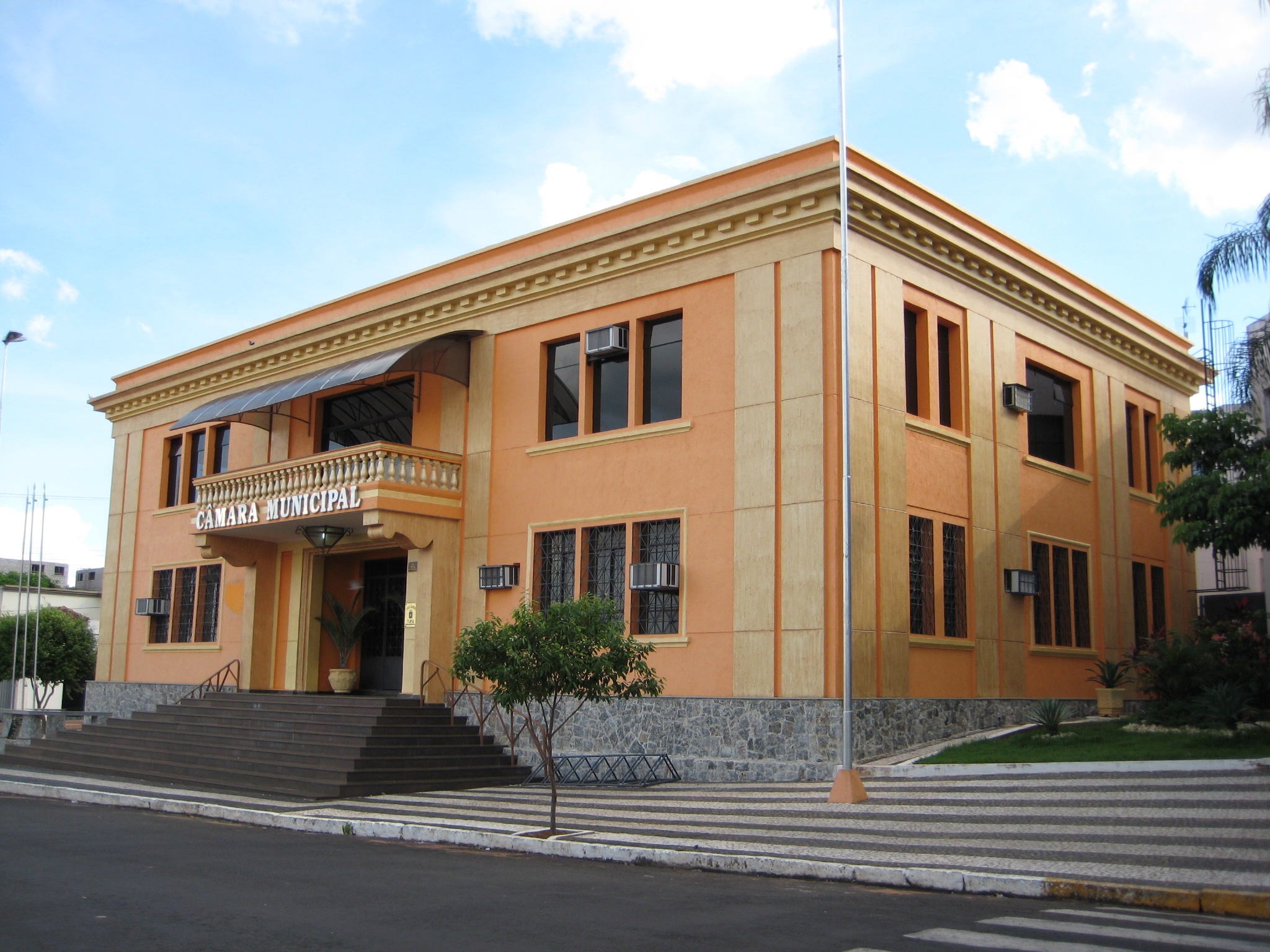
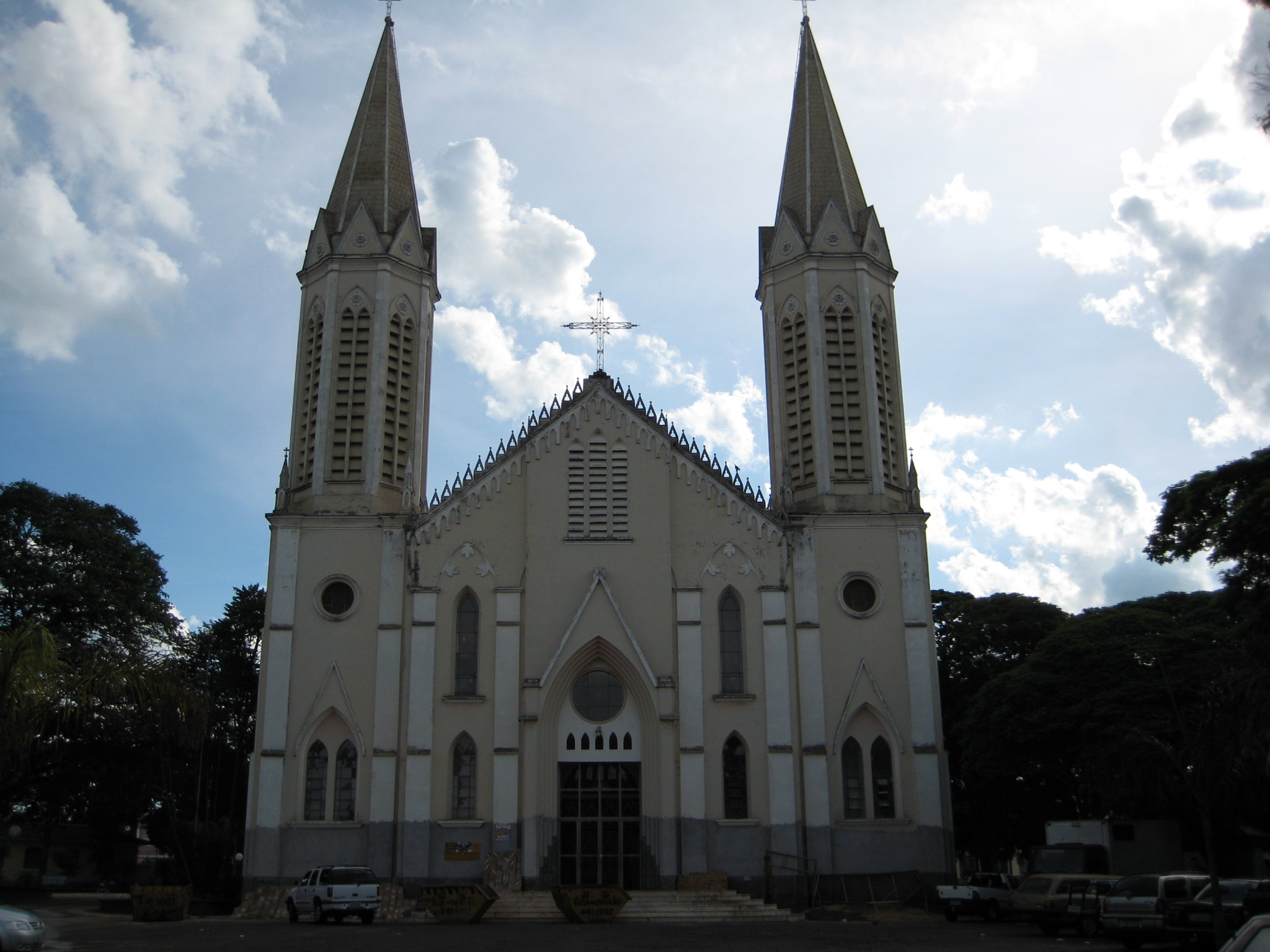
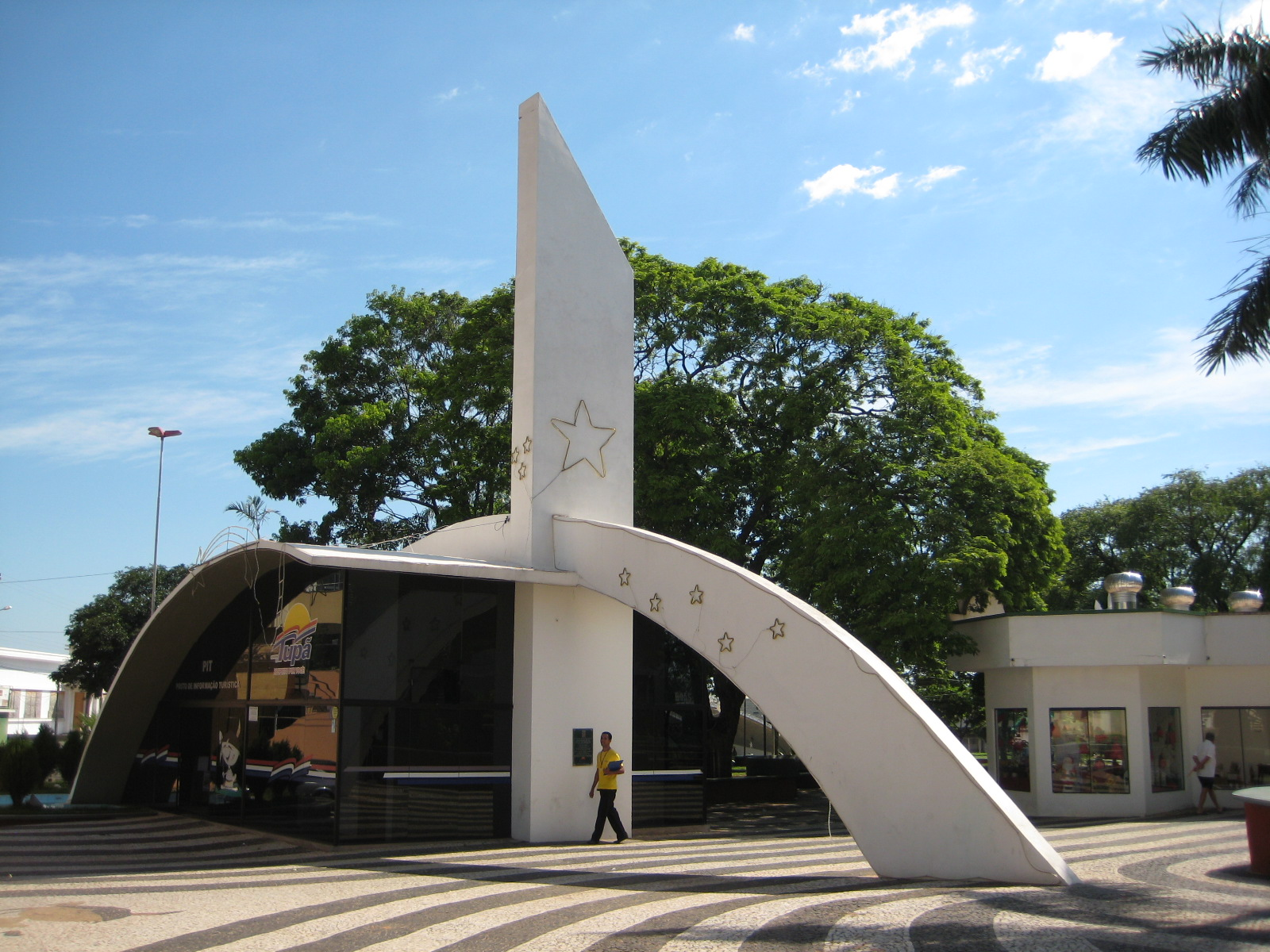
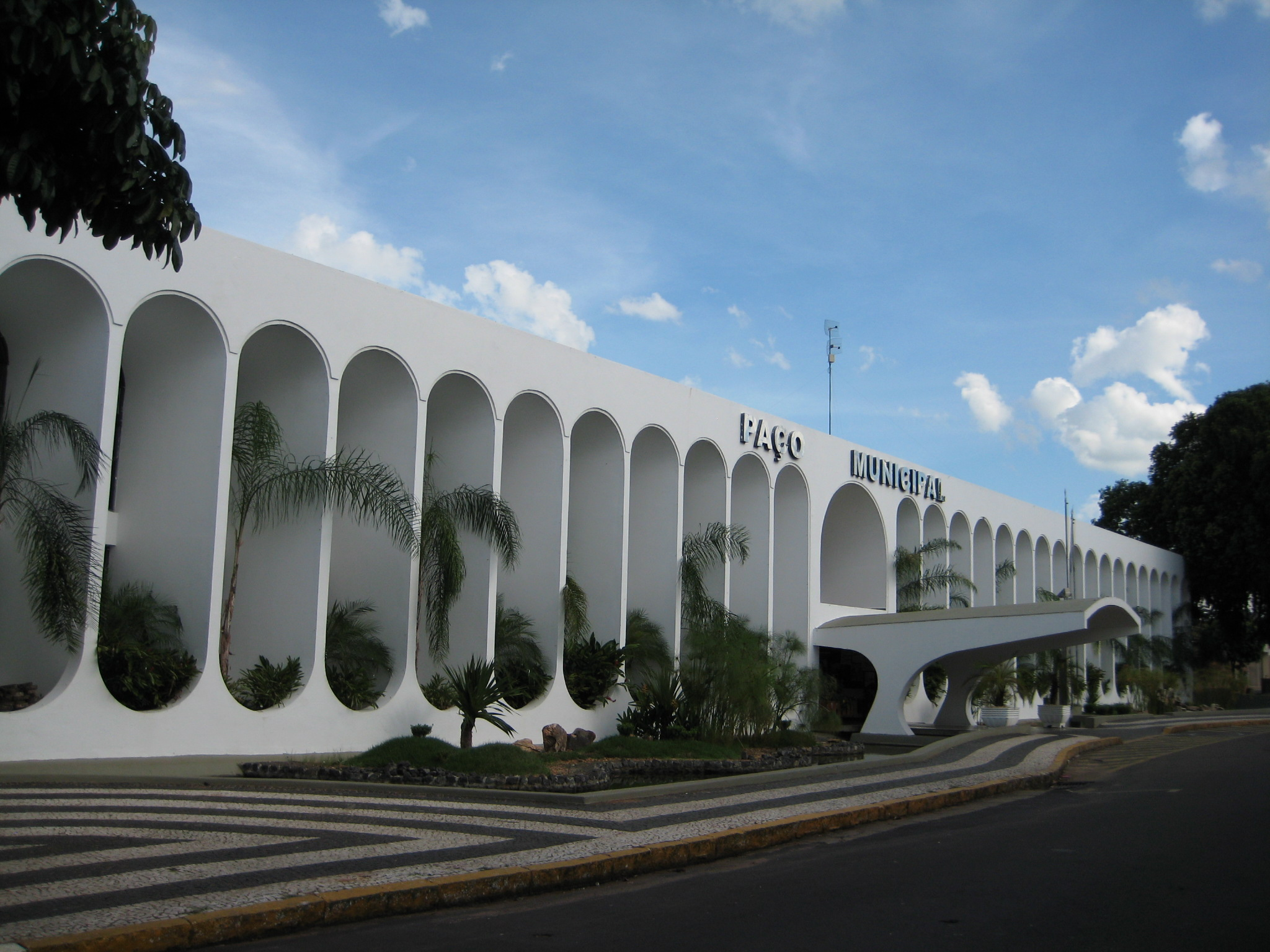
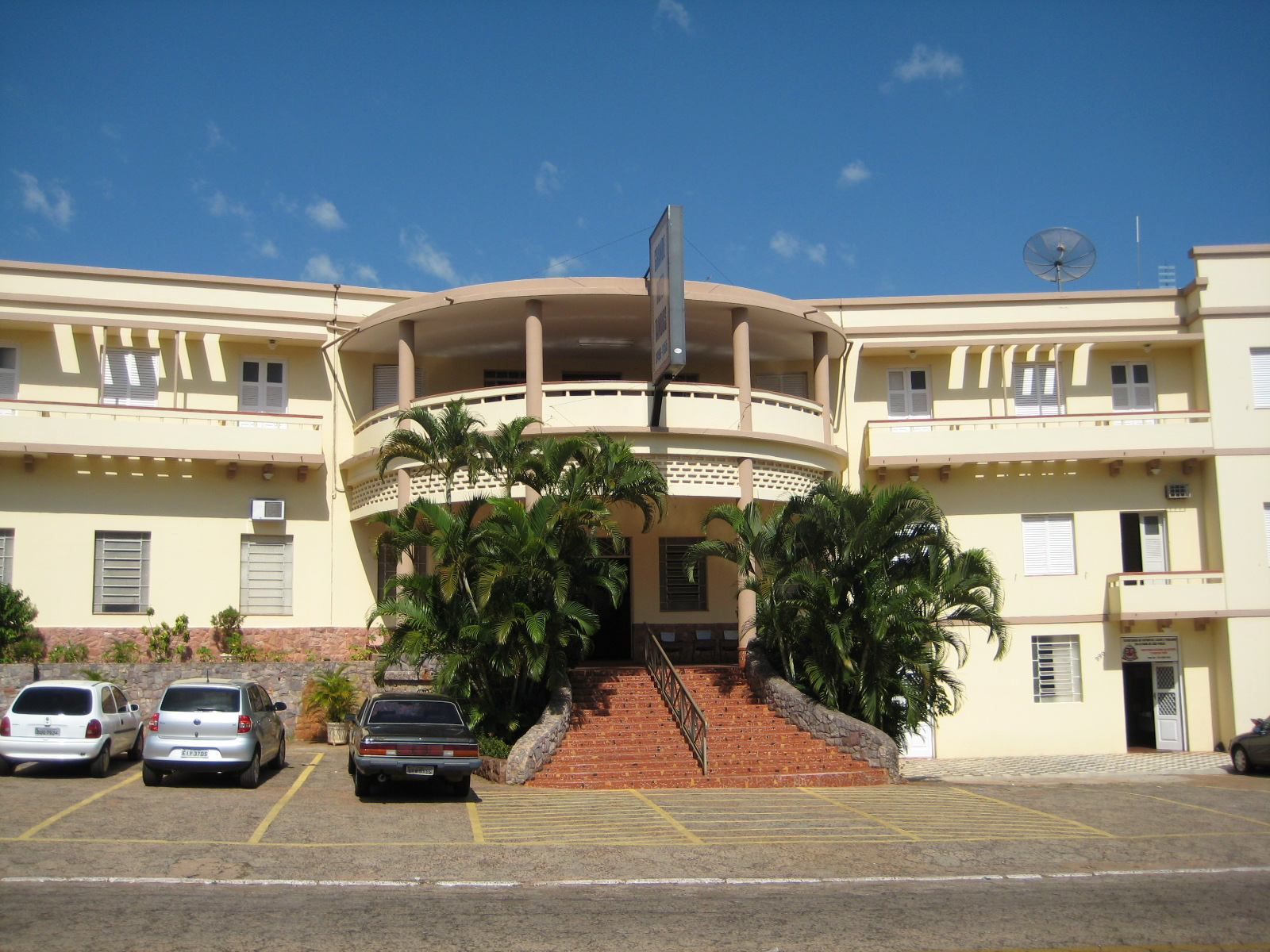
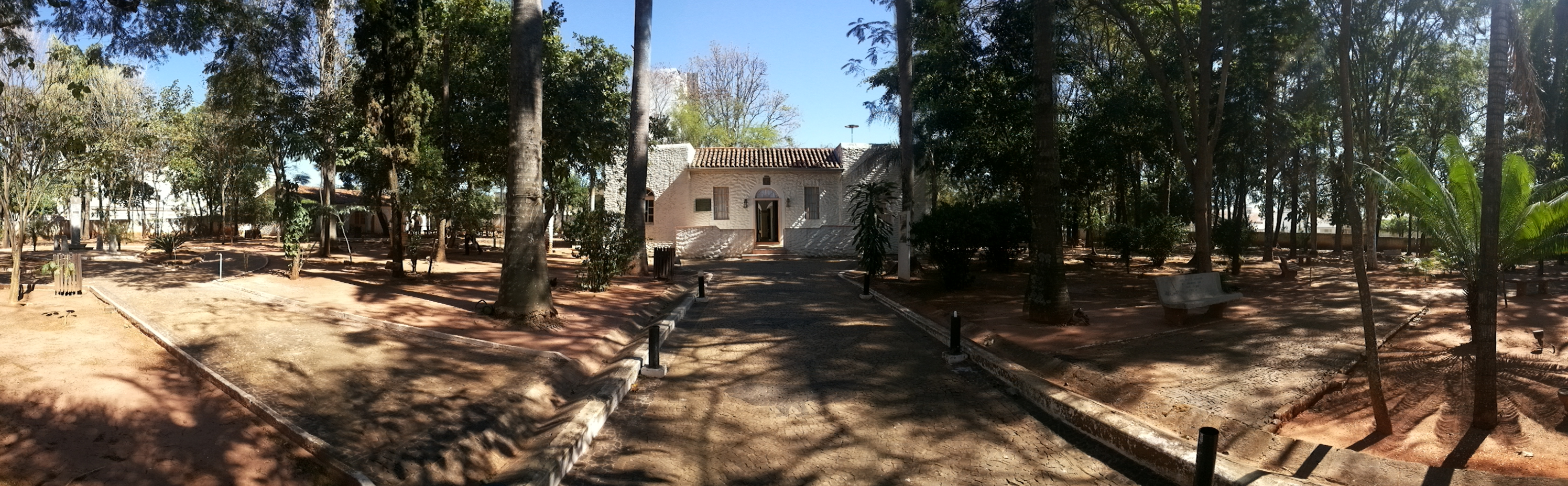

- Flag Coat of arms

- Location in São Paulo
- Coordinates: 21°56′5″S 50°30′49″W
- Country: Brazil
- Region: Southeast
- State: São Paulo
- Founded: 12 October 1929

Area
  - Total: 628 km^{2} (242 sq mi)

Population (2020)
  - Total: 65,570
  - Density: 104/km^{2} (270/sq mi)
- Time zone: UTC-03:00 (BRT)
- HDI (2010): 0.771 – high
- Website: tupa.sp.gov.br

Tupã is a municipality in the state of São Paulo in Brazil. The population is 65,570 (2020 est.) in an area of 628 km^{2}. The city is located in the Alta Paulista Region and it is located 530 km (329.32 sq mi) from capital São Paulo. It was founded on October 12, 1929 by Luiz de Souza Leão a business man that chose the region that were tropical forest. The city is located between 2 rivers: Aguapeí River and Rio do Peixe.

The city is named after a god of thunder in the Guaraní mythology.

== History ==
The municipality was created by state law in 1938.

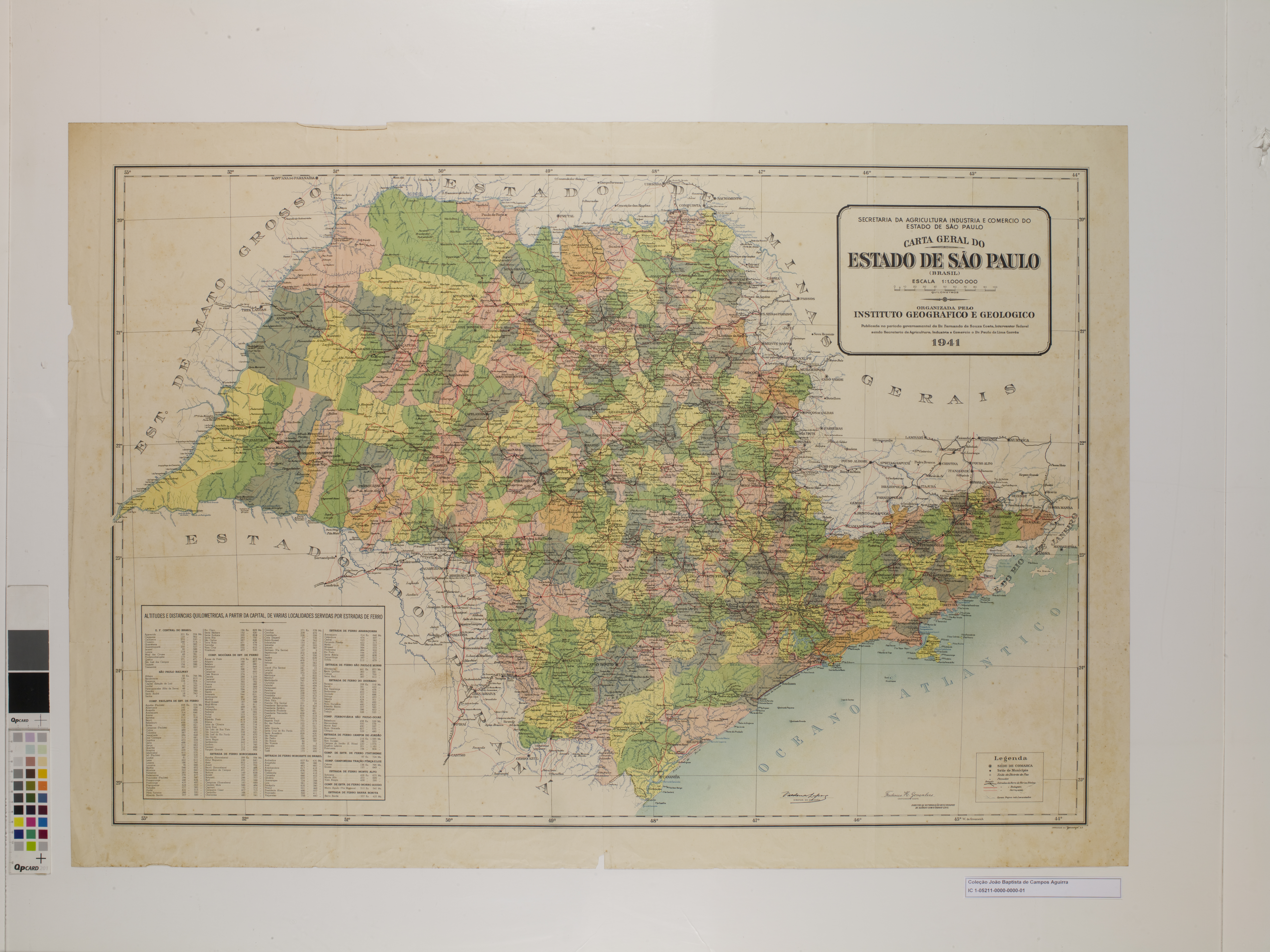
Map of the state of São Paulo (1938).

== Demographics ==
Historical population (municipality)
Year	Population	%±
1940	35,583	—
1950	56,682	59.3%
1960	56,468	−0.4%
1970	52,537	−7.0%
1980	56,587	7.7%
1991	61,302	8.3%
2000	63,333	3.3%
2010	69,476	9.7%
2022	75,928	9.3%

== Media ==
In telecommunications, the city was served by Telecomunicações de São Paulo. In July 1998, this company was acquired by Telefónica, which adopted the Vivo brand in 2012. The company is currently an operator of cell phones, fixed lines, internet (fiber optics/4G) and television (satellite and cable).

== Religion ==
Christianity is present in the city as follows:

=== Catholic Church ===
The Catholic church in the municipality is part of the Roman Catholic Diocese of Marília.

=== Protestant Church ===
The most diverse evangelical beliefs are present in the city, mainly Pentecostal, including the Assemblies of God in Brazil (the largest evangelical church in the country), Christian Congregation in Brazil, among others. These denominations are growing more and more throughout Brazil.

== Transportation ==
Tupã is served by José Vicente Faria Lima State Airport.

== See also ==
- List of municipalities in São Paulo
