= Dracena =

Municipality in the state of São Paulo in Brazil

- Municipality
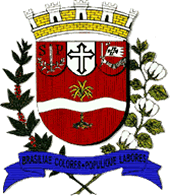
- Flag Coat of arms

- Location in São Paulo state

- Location in Brazil
- Coordinates: 21°28′58″S 51°31′58″W
- Country: Brazil
- Region: Southeast
- State: São Paulo
- Mesoregion: Presidente Prudente

Area
  - Total: 488 km^{2} (188 sq mi)
- Elevation: 421 m (1,381 ft)

Population (2015)
  - Total: 45,847
  - Density: 93.9/km^{2} (243/sq mi)
- Time zone: UTC-03:00 (BRT)
  - Summer (DST): UTC-02:00 (BRST)
- Postal code: 17900-000
- Area code: +55(018)
- Website: www.dracena.sp.gov.br

Dracena is a municipality in the state of São Paulo in Brazil. The population is 45,847 (2015 est.) in an area of 488 km^{2} (188 sq mi). The elevation is 421 m.

== History ==
Dracena was founded on December 8, 1945 on the initiative of Irio Spinardi, João Vandramini, Virgílio and Florêncio Fioravanti. It grew rapidly, and became an independent municipality in 1948, when it was separated from Lucélia.

Map of the state of São Paulo (1948).

== Geography ==
The municipality contains part of the 7,720 hectares (19,100 acres) Rio do Peixe State Park, created in 2002.

=== Climate ===
The climate is subtropical, The annual medium temperature is 23.4 °C (74.1 °F), the warmest month is January 27.8 °C (82.0 °F) and the coolest month is July 17.3 °C (63.1 °F). The highest temperature ever registered was 43.1 °C (109.6 °F) and the lowest, −4.1 °C (24.6 °F).

== Media ==
In telecommunications, the city was served by Telecomunicações de São Paulo. In July 1998, this company was acquired by Telefónica, which adopted the Vivo brand in 2012. The company is currently an operator of cell phones, fixed lines, internet (fiber optics/4G) and television (satellite and cable).

== Religion ==
Christianity is present in the city as follows:

=== Catholic Church ===
The Catholic church in the municipality is part of the Roman Catholic Diocese of Marília.

=== Protestant Church ===
The most diverse evangelical beliefs are present in the city, mainly Pentecostal, including the Assemblies of God in Brazil (the largest evangelical church in the country), Christian Congregation in Brazil, among others. These denominations are growing more and more throughout Brazil.

== Transportation ==
Dracena is served by Muliterno de Dracena Airport.

== Notable people ==
- Rodrigo Caio, Football player

== See also ==
- List of municipalities in São Paulo
