= Presidente Epitácio =

- Municipality
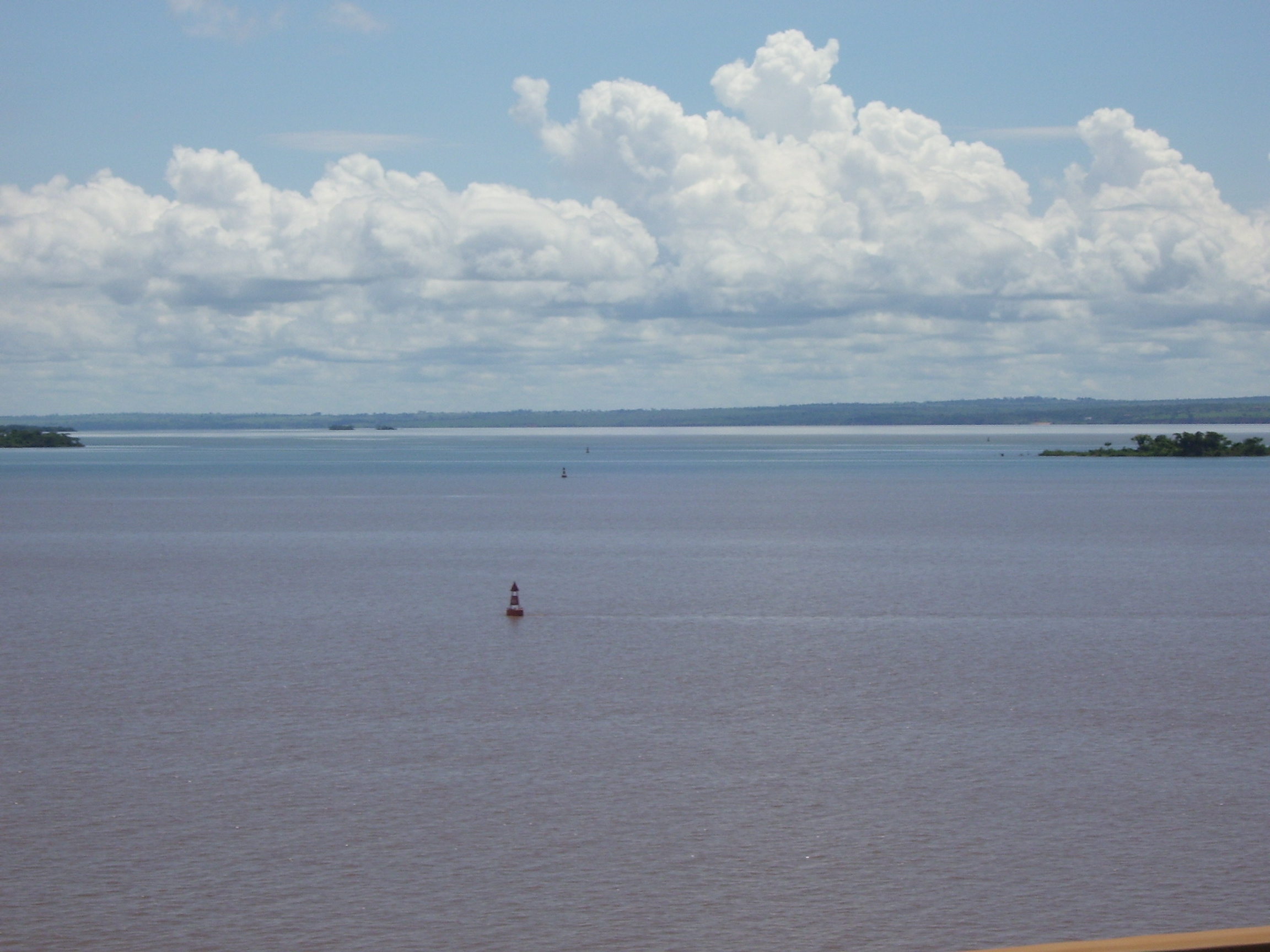
- Paraná River in Presidente Epitácio

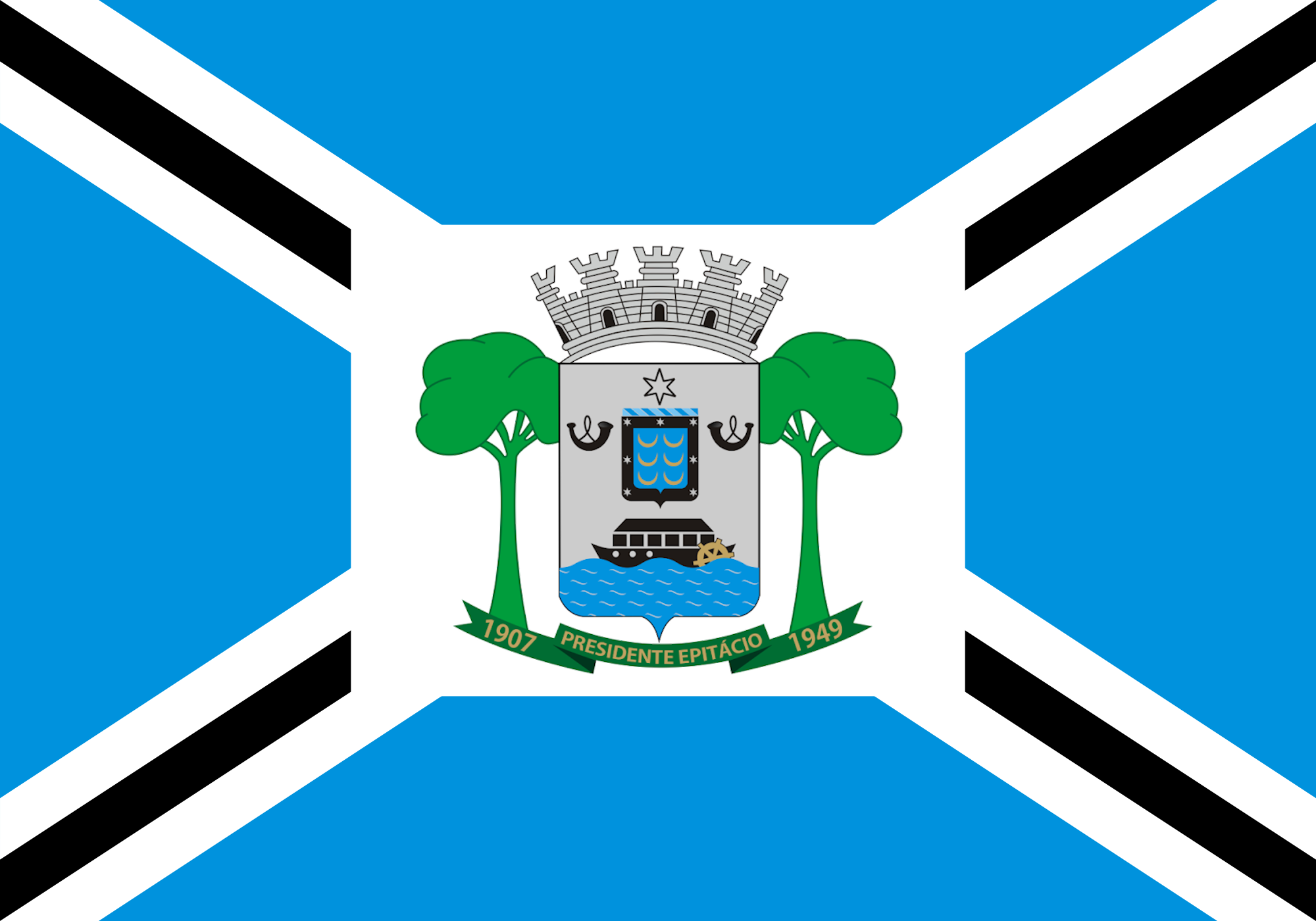
- Flag Coat of arms

- Location in São Paulo state

- Location in Brazil
- Coordinates: 21°45′53″S 52°6′19″W
- Country: Brazil
- Region: Southeast
- State: São Paulo

Area
  - Total: 1,260 km^{2} (490 sq mi)
- Elevation: 310 m (1,020 ft)

Population (2020)
  - Total: 44,389
  - Density: 35.2/km^{2} (91.2/sq mi)
- Time zone: UTC-03:00 (BRT)
  - Summer (DST): UTC-02:00 (BRST)
- Website: http://www.presidenteepitacio.sp.gov.br/

Presidente Epitácio is a municipality in the state of São Paulo in Brazil. The town is named after Epitácio Pessoa. The population is 44,389 (2020 est.) in an area of 1260 km^{2}. The elevation is 310 m. It is situated on the Paraná River, which forms the border with Mato Grosso do Sul here.

== History ==
The municipality was created by state law in 1948 and named after Epitácio Pessoa, President of Brazil.

Map of the state of São Paulo (1948).

== Geography ==
The municipality contains the 937-hectare (2,320-acre) Lagoa São Paulo Reserve. It contains part of the 246,800-hectare (610,000-acre) Great Pontal Reserve, created in 1942. It also contains 11% of the 6,677-hectare (16,500-acre) Mico Leão Preto Ecological Station, established in 2002.

== Demographics ==
Historical population (municipality)
Year	Population	%±
1950	6,384	—
1960	18,966	197.1%
1970	26,428	39.3%
1980	29,608	12.0%
1991	34,851	17.7%
2000	39,298	12.8%
2010	41,318	5.1%
2022	39,505	−4.4%

== Media ==
In telecommunications, the city was served by Telecomunicações de São Paulo. In July 1998, this company was acquired by Telefónica, which adopted the Vivo brand in 2012. The company is currently an operator of cell phones, fixed lines, internet (fiber optics/4G) and television (satellite and cable).

== Transportation ==
Presidente Epitácio is served by Geraldo Moacir Bordon State Airport.

== Climate ==
Climate data for Presidente Epitácio, elevation 308 m (1,010 ft), (2014–2021 normals, extremes 2014–2022)
Month	Jan	Feb	Mar	Apr	May	Jun	Jul	Aug	Sep	Oct	Nov	Dec	Year
Record high °C (°F)	38.9 (102.0)	39.5 (103.1)	37.1 (98.8)	36.3 (97.3)	34.0 (93.2)	33.3 (91.9)	34.3 (93.7)	37.3 (99.1)	41.2 (106.2)	40.0 (104.0)	39.7 (103.5)	39.1 (102.4)	41.2 (106.2)
Mean daily maximum °C (°F)	33.2 (91.8)	33.0 (91.4)	32.4 (90.3)	31.2 (88.2)	28.3 (82.9)	27.0 (80.6)	27.5 (81.5)	29.4 (84.9)	32.2 (90.0)	31.9 (89.4)	32.5 (90.5)	32.9 (91.2)	31.0 (87.7)
Daily mean °C (°F)	27.9 (82.2)	27.6 (81.7)	26.9 (80.4)	25.2 (77.4)	22.3 (72.1)	21.1 (70.0)	20.6 (69.1)	22.4 (72.3)	25.5 (77.9)	26.0 (78.8)	26.8 (80.2)	27.5 (81.5)	25.0 (77.0)
Mean daily minimum °C (°F)	22.6 (72.7)	22.1 (71.8)	21.4 (70.5)	19.3 (66.7)	16.4 (61.5)	15.3 (59.5)	13.8 (56.8)	15.3 (59.5)	18.8 (65.8)	20.1 (68.2)	21.0 (69.8)	22.2 (72.0)	19.0 (66.2)
Record low °C (°F)	18.5 (65.3)	17.4 (63.3)	16.6 (61.9)	7.6 (45.7)	9.1 (48.4)	2.7 (36.9)	2.2 (36.0)	7.3 (45.1)	9.9 (49.8)	12.0 (53.6)	14.8 (58.6)	17.1 (62.8)	2.2 (36.0)
Average precipitation mm (inches)	173.3 (6.82)	158.1 (6.22)	108.5 (4.27)	53.4 (2.10)	77.1 (3.04)	50.9 (2.00)	33.1 (1.30)	50.9 (2.00)	65.6 (2.58)	128.3 (5.05)	108.0 (4.25)	139.6 (5.50)	1,146.8 (45.13)
Average precipitation days (≥ 1.0 mm)	14.4	10.1	8.1	5.4	5.1	4.8	2.8	4.8	6.3	9.0	9.3	14.1	94.2
Source: Centro Integrado de Informações Agrometeorológicas

== Religion ==
Christianity is present in the city as follows:

=== Catholic Church ===
The Catholic church in the municipality is part of the Roman Catholic Diocese of Presidente Prudente.

=== Protestant Church ===
The most diverse evangelical beliefs are present in the city, mainly Pentecostal, including the Assemblies of God in Brazil (the largest evangelical church in the country), Christian Congregation in Brazil, among others. These denominations are growing more and more throughout Brazil.

== See also ==
- List of municipalities in São Paulo
