= Presidente Prudente Airport =

Adhemar de Barros State Airport Aeroporto Estadual Adhemar de Barros
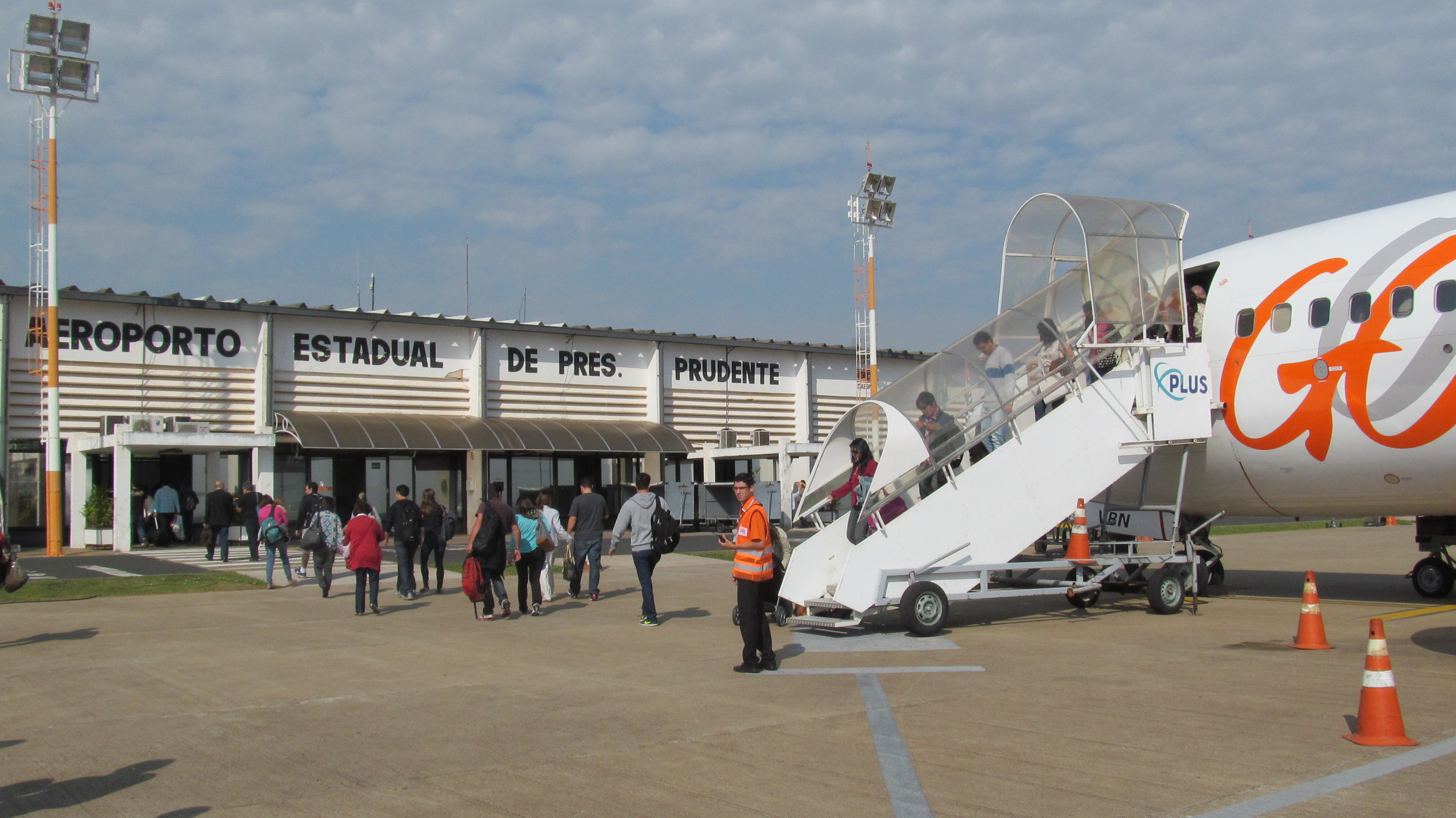
- IATA: PPB; ICAO: SBDN; LID: SP0005

Summary
- Airport type: Public
- Operator: DAESP (?–2021); ASP (2021–present)
- Serves: Presidente Prudente
- Time zone: BRT (UTC−03:00)
- Elevation AMSL: 452 m (1,483 ft)
- Coordinates: 22°10′30″S 051°25′28″W

Map
- Location in Brazil PPB (Brazil)

Runways
Direction	Length		Surface
Direction	m	ft	Surface
12/30	2,100	6,890	Asphalt

Statistics (2019)
- Passengers: 319,059 ▲12%
- Aircraft Operations: 12,988 ▼20%
- Statistics: DAESP; Sources: Airport Website, ANAC, DECEA

Adhemar de Barros State Airport (IATA: PPB, ICAO: SBDN) is the airport serving Presidente Prudente, Brazil.

It is operated by ASP.

== History ==
On July 15, 2021, the concession of the airport was auctioned to the Aeroportos Paulista Consortium (ASP), comprising companies Socicam and Dix. The airport was previously operated by DAESP.

== Airlines and destinations ==
Airlines	Destinations
Azul Brazilian Airlines	Campinas, Porto Seguro; Seasonal: Maceió, Natal
Gol Linhas Aéreas	São Paulo–Congonhas

== Access ==
The airport is located 5 km (3 mi) from downtown Presidente Prudente.

== See also ==
- List of airports in Brazil
