= Ourinhos Airport =

Jornalista Benedito Pimentel–Ourinhos Airport Aeroporto Jornalista Benedito Pimentel–Ourinhos
- IATA: OUS; ICAO: SDOU; LID: SP0023

Summary
- Airport type: Public
- Operator: DAESP (?–2018); Ourinhos (2018–present)
- Serves: Ourinhos
- Time zone: BRT (UTC−03:00)
- Elevation AMSL: 462 m (1,516 ft)
- Coordinates: 22°58′25″S 049°54′41″W

Map
- Location in Brazil OUS (Brazil)

Runways
Direction	Length		Surface
Direction	m	ft	Surface
16/34	1,500	4,921	Asphalt

Statistics (2015)
- Passengers: 1,159
- Aircraft Operations: 1,482
- Metric tonnes of cargo: 0
- Statistics: DAESP; Sources: Airport Website, ANAC, DECEA

Jornalista Benedito Pimentel–Ourinhos Airport (IATA: OUS, ICAO: SDOU) is the airport serving Ourinhos, Brazil.

It is operated by the Municipality of Ourinhos.

== History ==
On February 16, 2018 the management of the airport was transferred to the Municipality of Ourinhos. Previously it was administrated by DAESP.

== Access ==
The airport is located 4 km (2 mi) from downtown Ourinhos.

== See also ==
- List of airports in Brazil
