= Department of Airspace Control =

Brazil's Department of Airspace Control (Portuguese: Departamento de Controle do Espaço Aéreo, DECEA) is a governmental military organization of the Aeronautics Command, which in turn is subordinated to the Ministry of Defense. Its mission is to manage air traffic services within Brazilian sovereign airspace, as well as to coordinate its defense along with the Brazilian Command of Airspace Defense (Portuguese: Comando de Defesa Aeroespacial Brasileiro, COMDABRA).

== History ==
The Department of Airspace Control originated on 12 January 1942 with the creation of the Air Routes Directorate (Portuguese: Diretoria de Rotas Aéreas, DR). The Air Routes Directorate was renamed to the Directorate of Electronics and Flight Protection (Portuguese: Diretoria de Eletrônica e Proteção ao Voo, DEPV) in 1972 before ultimately changing its name once again to the Department of Airspace Control in 2011.
