= TAM Airlines Flight 540 =

Aviation crash from January 1990

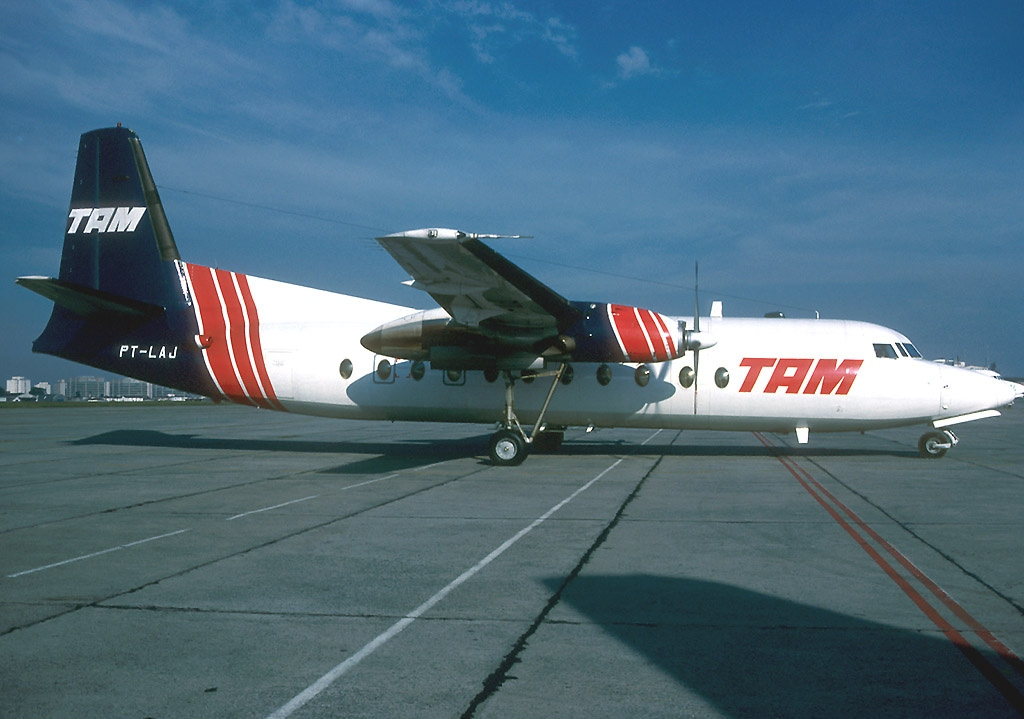
- A TAM Fokker F-27 Friendship , similar to the aircraft involved in the accident

Accident
- Date: 12 February 1990
- Summary: Go-around failure due to pilot error
- Site: Bauru Airport, Bauru, Brazil
- Total fatalities: 3
- Total injuries: 13
- Total survivors: 40

Aircraft
- Aircraft type: Fokker F-27-200 Friendship
- Operator: TAM Airlines
- Registration: PT-LCG
- Flight origin: São Paulo–Congonhas Airport, São Paulo, Brazil
- Destination: Bauru Airport, Bauru, Brazil
- Occupants: 41
- Passengers: 38
- Crew: 3
- Fatalities: 1
- Injuries: 13
- Survivors: 40

Ground casualties
- Ground fatalities: 2

TAM Airlines Flight 540 was a domestic flight in Brazil from São Paulo to Bauru. On 12 February 1990, the Fokker F27 Friendship crashed while go-around after a failed attempt to land at Bauru Airport, killing the instructor and two individuals on ground.

This plane crash was considered to be the most serious air accident in the Bauru region.

== Background ==
=== Aircraft ===
The aircraft involved was a Fokker F27 Friendship, manufactured in 1962.

=== Crew member ===
On board was the instructor named Paulo Sérgio Espósito, who have acquired 5,706 flight hours with 3,578 of them were in the F27. He was the only fatality on the plane.

The pilot flying was Minoru Kawakubo, who have acquried 10,010 flight hours with 1,286 of them were in the F27. He was under training during the flight. After the crash, he was fired and became a flight instructor for Pantanal Linhas Aéreas.

== Accident ==
At around 9:40 AM, at an altitude of 4000 feet, the crew decided to make a direct approach instead of the IFR plan. The plane was found to be too high for a proper descent but the instructor decided to continue the approach by pushing back the throttles and pushing the nose down steeply to bring back to the flight level. The plane touch down 775 meters from the threshold, nose gear first. The plane bounced and touched again 959 meters from the threshold. They realized they won't be able to stop the plane in time, so they initiated a go-around. However, the aircraft then stalled, fell down rapidly and crashed into obstacles.

The plane struck a vehicle carrying Gisele Marie Savi Pinto and her son, Guilherme - all died at the scene. The captain initially survived, but was unconcious, trapped at the scene and died 27 days later due to smoke intoxication. Apart from the mother and child, other residents were not injured or affected. 25 passengers escaped unharmed, 11 passengers were injured. The co-pilot and flight attendant were also injured.

== Investigation ==
The investigation was conducted by CENIPA. On November 14, 1990, the final report was finalized. The reason for the stall during the go-around was found to be an abrupt throttle acceleration done by the instructor. This cause the engine combustion to gain too much fuel, insufficient air was received to ignite the kerosene-oxygen mixture and the temperature rose to a critical level, which hampered the propellor to produce energy for the lift. The flap was still retracted during the touchdown and go-around, lowering down the critical angle of attack. Those factors combined led to the aircraft's stalling condition.

== Lawsuit ==
Relatives of the victims demand compensation from the airline at Superior Court of Justice. The airline initially was ordered but then able to appeal as the crash was not the airlines' fault. Howevery, it was later denied after the court recognized the need for reimbursement of personal belongings damaged or lost in the accident. The company also need to cover funeral expenses not covered by social security institutions. In total, the airline had to pay 500 minimum wage per victims.

The airline also had to compensate R$116,000 for a passenger named Carlos Salles as he suffered from spinal injuries in the accident leading to a 20% loss of his work capacity.
