= TAM Transportes Aéreos Regionais Flight 283 =

1997 aircraft bombing in Brazil

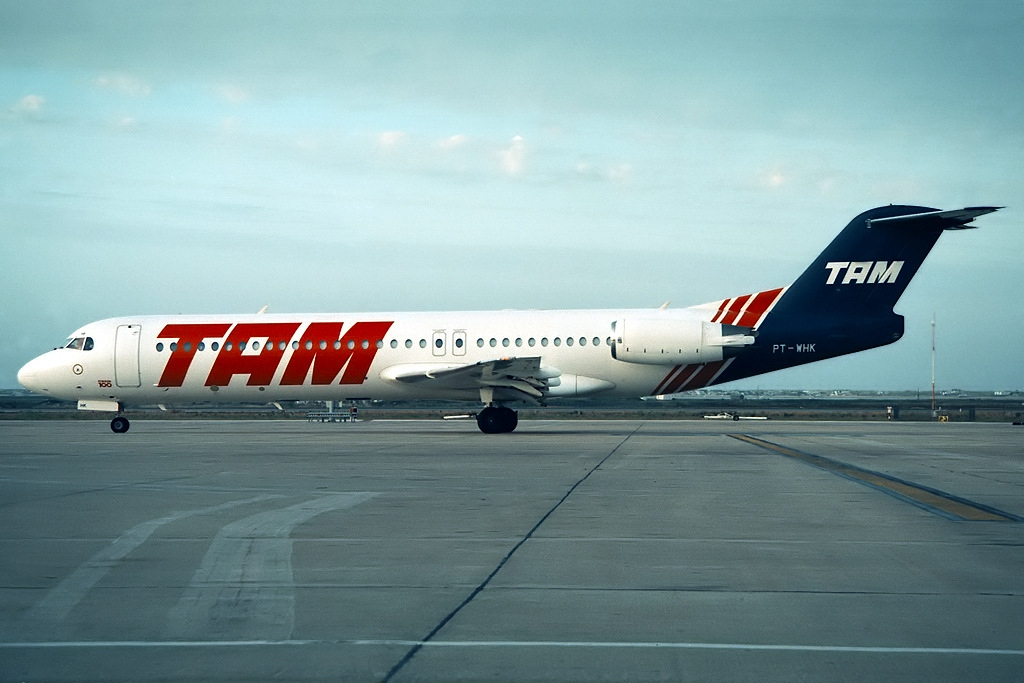
- PT-WHK, the aircraft involved in the bombing, seen in May 1997

Accident
- Date: 9 July 1997
- Summary: Bomb explosion on board
- Site: Near Suzano, São Paulo state, Brazil; 23°32′37″S 46°18′40″W

Aircraft
- Aircraft type: Fokker 100
- Operator: TAM Transportes Aéreos Regionais
- IATA flight No.: JJ283
- ICAO flight No.: TAM283
- Call sign: TAM 283
- Registration: PT-WHK
- Flight origin: Eurico de Aguiar Salles Airport, Vitória, Espírito Santo, Brazil
- 1st stopover: São José dos Campos Airport, São Paulo state, Brazil
- Destination: São Paulo–Congonhas Airport, São Paulo state, Brazil
- Occupants: 60
- Passengers: 55
- Crew: 5
- Fatalities: 1
- Injuries: 6
- Survivors: 59

TAM Transportes Aéreos Regionais Flight 283 was a domestic Fokker 100 flying in Brazil from Eurico de Aguiar Salles Airport to São Paulo–Congonhas Airport, with a stopover in São José dos Campos Airport. On 9 July, 1997, a bomb explosion blew a hole in the aircraft fuselage, ejecting a passenger out of the plane. After the explosion, the crew managed to perform a safe emergency landing at São Paulo–Congonhas Airport.

No one was ever sentenced for the attack.

== Background ==
=== Aircraft ===
The aircraft involved was a Fokker 100 registered as PT-WHK, manufactured in 1993 and acquired by TAM in 1996. After the bombing the aircraft was repaired and remained in service until at least 2015.

=== Crew and passengers ===
The flight's captain was Humberto Angel Scarel, who was said to be an experienced pilot, while the first officer was Ricardo della Volpi, the other three crew members were female flight attendants. On board there were also 55 passengers, all Brazilians. The only fatality of the attack was 38-year-old passenger Fernando Moura.

== Accident ==
The aircraft was scheduled to do a domestic flight from Eurico de Aguiar Salles Airport to São Paulo–Congonhas Airport, with an intermediate stopover in São José dos Campos Airport. The plane took off from Eurico de Aguiar Salles Airport at around 6:55 am local time, the first leg of the flight went uneventful. At around 8:30 am the aircraft departed São José dos Campos for the final leg of the flight to Congonhas Airport. As the aircraft was climbing through flight level FL080, at 8:48 am, a bomb planted underneath seat 18D exploded, ripping a 2x2 meters in size and 30 centimeters deep hole through the fuselage.

Fernando Moura, seated on seat 18E, the one placed next to where the bomb exploded, was sucked out of the aircraft and killed after he fell into a field located near the Tijuco Preto neighbourhood. The body of Moura was found by a local farmer, who soon contacted the police. Fragments of the aircraft fuselage were also spread in a radius of about 300 meters around the point where the explosion occurred.

A few minutes after the detonation of the bomb the crew of Flight 283, which initially thought that the depressurization of the cabin was caused by the mid-air opening of a cargo door, contacted the Congonhas Airport's ATC to inform them that they were going to make an emergency landing. The aircraft landed safely at Congonhas Airport at around 9:05 am. After de-boarding the other six injured people, five passengers and a flight attendant, were taken to the Jabaquara emergency room and to the São Paulo hospital to be treated for minor injuries.

== Investigation ==
The hypothesis of a bombing was quickly taken into consideration after the survivors reported a burning smell on board, and chemical residues were found around the hole in the fuselage; so the Federal Police of Brazil started a 90 day investigation into the occurrence. Ground witnesses, including the farmer that found Moura's body, also reported hearing sounds similar to an explosion while the accident occurred. Fuselage and cabin fragments of the aircraft were taken to Congonhas Airport for analyses and traces of gunpowder were found.

After the investigation the Federal Police of Brazil and the Public Prosecutor's Office declared that the main suspect as the attacker was professor Leonardo Teodoro de Castro, which was suspected to have built and planted the improvised bomb.

But just three days after the release of this information de Castro was run over by a bus and left in a coma-like state, and because of this his trial was suspended. After almost a year of medical care de Castro remained in a state of near dementia. Until 2009, he had to submit to a mental acuity test designed to evaluate whether he would be able to be judged. As of 2010 de Castro lives with a sister in Divinopolis, Minas Gerais. In 2021, 24 years after the bombing, a federal judge declared that de Castro could not be punished, due to his health issues.

== Aftermath ==
After the accident, the vice president of TAM Transportes Aéreos Regionais, Luis Eduardo Falco, stated that they still couldn't say for sure that it was an explosion, and that they would have waited for the official investigation result, also he stated that the airline didn't receive any threats in the days prior to the attack.

In 2021 a federal court in São Paulo sentenced the Federal government of Brazil and the state-owned company Infraero to pay 2,5 million Brazilian real in compensation to Instituto de Resseguros do Brasil and TAM Transportes Aéreos Regionais to cover the cost of the repair of the damage caused by the bomb to the aircraft. The Federal Government and Infraero were found responsible of not checking properly the luggage and passengers before boarding, letting the bomb being introduced into the cabin.

== See also ==
- Daallo Airlines Flight 159, another aircraft where a bomb exploded near the fuselage creating a hole that sucked out a passenger
- 1997 in aviation
- Timeline of airliner bombing attacks
