= LATAM Airlines Brasil =

Subsidiary airline of LATAM Airlines Group

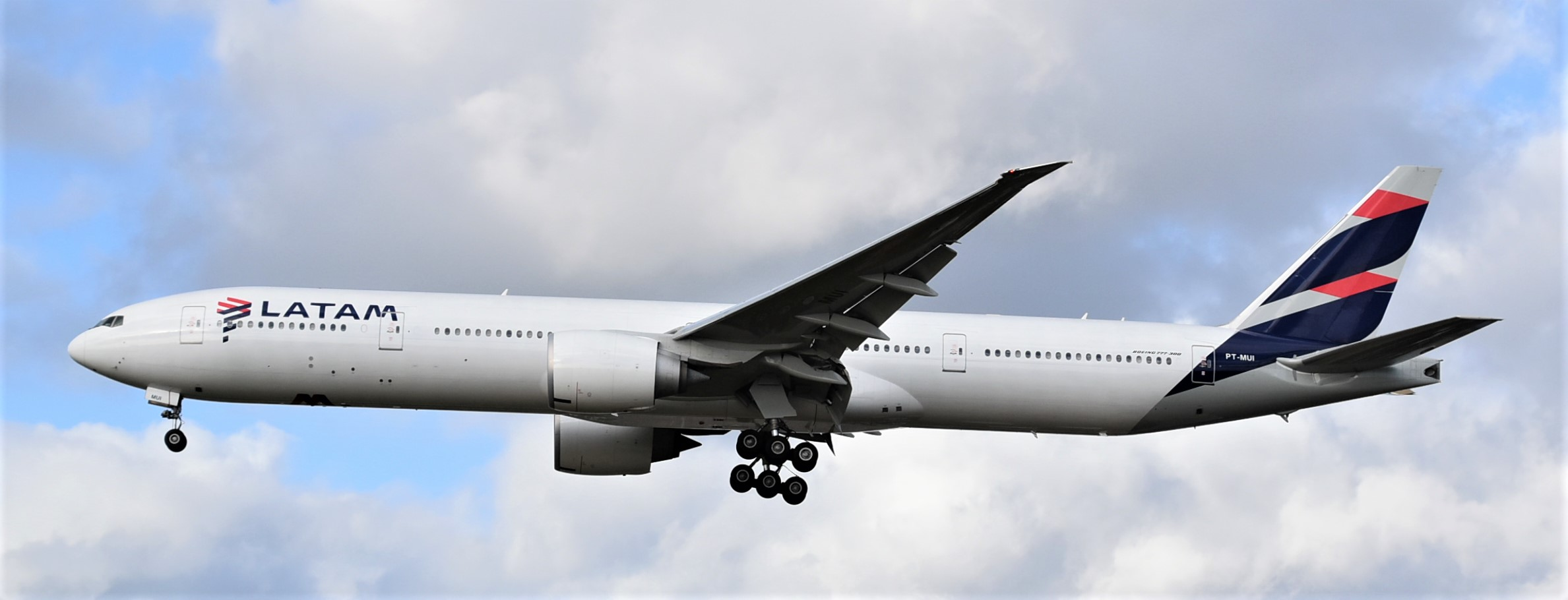
- A LATAM Airlines Brasil Boeing 777-300ER
IATA	ICAO	Call sign
JJ (LA)	TAM	TAM
- Founded: 21 February 1961; 65 years ago (as TAM – Táxi Aéreo Marília); 11 November 1975; 50 years ago (as TAM – Transportes Aéreos Marília)
- Commenced operations: 12 July 1976; 50 years ago (as TAM – Transportes Aéreos Marília); 15 May 2000; 26 years ago (as TAM Linhas Aéreas); 5 May 2016; 10 years ago (as LATAM Brasil)
- AOC #: 13,221 (November 24, 2023)
- Hubs: Brasília; Fortaleza; São Paulo–Congonhas; São Paulo–Guarulhos
- Focus cities: Porto Alegre; Rio de Janeiro–Galeão
- Frequent-flyer program: LATAM Pass
- Fleet size: 170
- Destinations: 87
- Parent company: LATAM Airlines Group
- Headquarters: São Paulo, Brazil
- Key people: Jerome Cadier (CEO)
- Founder: Rolim Amaro
- Revenue: ▲US10.7 billion (2017)
- Net income: ▲US$109.4 million (2017)
- Website: www.latam.com

LATAM Airlines Brasil, formerly TAM Linhas Aéreas, is the Brazilian brand of Chilean LATAM Airlines Group operating international and domestic flights from hubs in Brasília, Fortaleza, and São Paulo. According to the National Civil Aviation Agency of Brazil (ANAC), between January and December 2023, LATAM had 37.8% of the domestic, and 18.2% of the international market share in terms of passenger-kilometers flown, making it the largest domestic and largest international airline in Brazil.

TAM Linhas Aéreas was Brazil's and Latin America's largest airline before the takeover by Chilean airline LAN Airlines. Its headquarters were in São Paulo, operating scheduled services to destinations within Brazil, as well as international flights to Europe and other parts of North and South America. Shares in the company were traded on the São Paulo Exchange (BM&F Bovespa) and New York Stock Exchange as "TAM". Prior to the merger with LAN, the company closed its capital, transferring its shares to LATAM Airlines Group. In August 2015, it was announced that the two airlines would fully rebrand as LATAM, with one livery to be applied on all aircraft by 2018. The airline withdrew from the Star Alliance and joined Oneworld, effective from March 31, 2014. The carrier left Oneworld on May 1, 2020.

The word "TAM" is an acronym for "Transportes Aéreos Marília", which dates back to the company's origins as a regional aviation company founded in Marília, in the state of São Paulo.

== History ==
=== The Origins: TAM – Táxi Aéreo Marília ===
TAM – Táxi Aéreo Marília and TAM – Transportes Aéreos Regionais were two different entities, although both belonged to the TAM Group. TAM – Marília, an air taxi company founded on February 21, 1961 at the city of Marília, provided the start-up infrastructure for TAM – Regionais.

=== TAM – Transportes Aéreos Regionais (KK) ===
On November 11, 1975, the Government of Brazil created the Brazilian Integrated System of Regional Air Transportation and divided the country in to five different regions, for which five newly created regional airlines received a concession to operate air services. Founded by Rolim Adolfo Amaro, TAM – Transportes Aéreos Regionais S/A was the third of those regional airlines to be made operational. Its services started on July 12, 1976, and its operational area comprised parts of the Southeast and Central West regions of Brazil, specifically the states of Mato Grosso do Sul, and parts of Mato Grosso, and São Paulo plus the possibility of serving the cities of Cuiabá, Rio de Janeiro, Londrina, Maringá, and Brasília when linking them to its area of concession.

TAM – Linhas Aéreas Regionais was formed as a joint-venture between TAM – Táxi Aéreo Marília, and VASP which was then a state-owned airline. The airline received the IATA code KK on October 13, 1999. The new airline flew Embraer EMB 110 Bandeirantes at first, but these proved grossly inadequate for the task at hand, and even at full capacity needed to be subsidized by the government in order to be profitable.

TAM went on to purchase three used Fokker F27 turboprops, which were subsequently refurbished by Fokker in the Netherlands. In order to obtain the import authorization for the aircraft, a deal was struck with the government in which TAM was forced to maintain three Bandeirantes for every F27, as well as removing five seats from each one, bringing the F27's capacity down to 40 passengers. A fourth F27, previously owned by Air New Zealand, was added to the TAM fleet in 1981. By 1983, TAM had acquired 10 F27s. By 1981, TAM had flown 1 million passengers, and 2 million by 1984.

=== TAM (KK) joint operations with TAM (JJ) ===
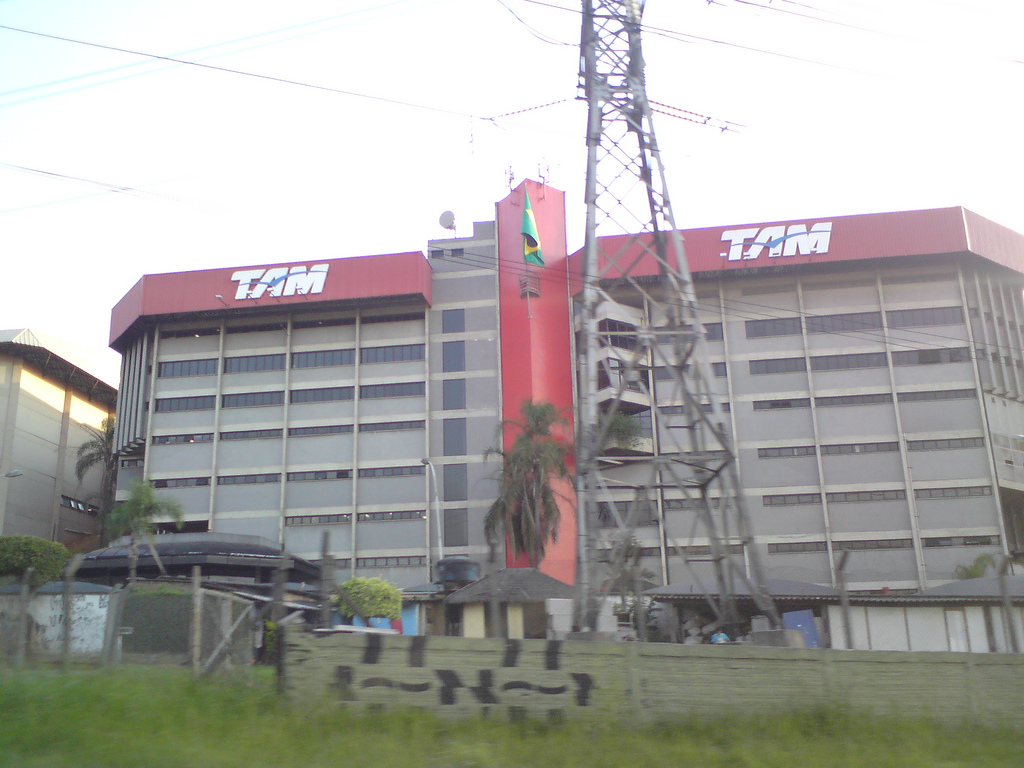
TAM's former headquarters, located at Congonhas Airport.

TAM's former logo (1980-2008)

Under financial stress, the company went public in August 1986, and began floating stock in the market. The same year, TAM – Transportes Aéreos Regionais (KK) acquired another regional airline, VOTEC, which operated in areas of northern and central Brazil. VOTEC was then renamed Brasil Central Linhas Aéreas. TAM and Brasil Central were both regional airlines and operated in different designated areas. They, however, operated as a consortium with integrated networks and fleet, with the most notable differences being the flight number IATA codes (whereas TAM had the IATA code KK, Brasil Central operated with the code JJ inherited from VOTEC), the different color schemes of the aircraft, and their designated areas of operation. In 1988, TAM flew its 3 millionth passenger.

On May 15, 1990, the Brazilian Government lifted restrictions on operational areas of regional airlines allowing them to fly anywhere in Brazil. As a consequence, Brasil Central was renamed TAM - Transportes Aéreos Meridionais, acquired the same color scheme of TAM (KK) but maintained the IATA code JJ.

In 2000, TAM (KK) was merged into TAM (JJ) and TAM (JJ) was renamed TAM Transportes Aéreos. The code JJ was maintained and the code KK was released back to IATA.

Despite TAM's success in the market, it was evident the airline would not last long when competing against airlines such as Varig and VASP, both of which already possessed Boeing 737s in their fleet. Amaro then tried to buy VASP, which was about to be privatized and called the project "Revolution". Having lost the bid, he opted for slower growth with the gradual addition of new aircraft, re-dubbed "Evolution".

=== Consolidation of Services ===
On September 15, 1989, TAM arranged for the acquisition of two Fokker 100 jets. Like the F27s before them, TAM did not actually purchase these aircraft but used Amaro's credibility to arrange for a third-party asset management company, Guinness Peat Aviation, to purchase them and subsequently lease them back to TAM. Two more were added in 1991. In 1992, TAM carried its 8 millionth passenger. By 1993, through the use of the Fokker 100 fleet, which now numbered at 14, TAM was serving 56 cities in Brazil.

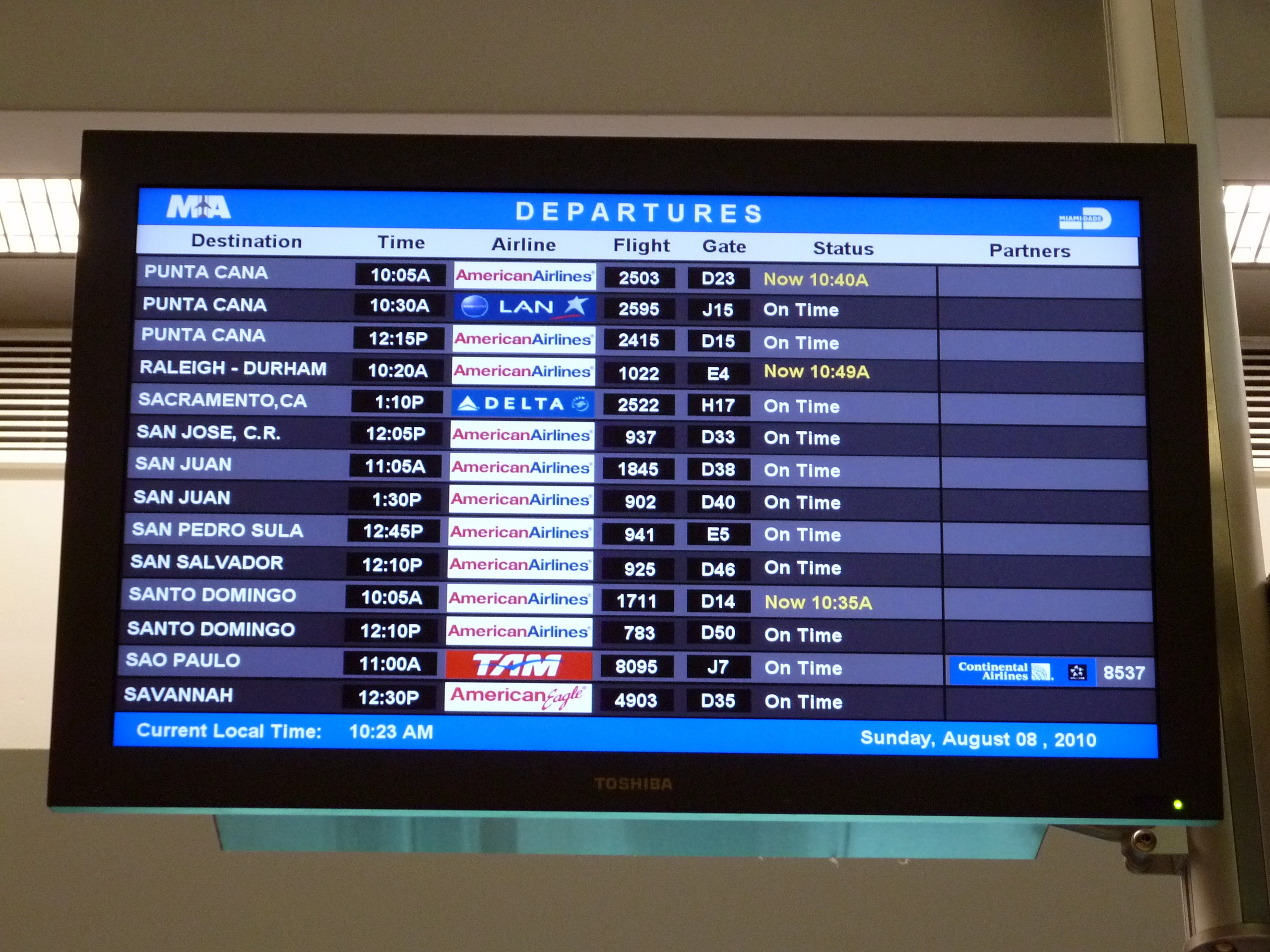
A departures board showing a TAM flight at Miami International Airport in August 2010

In 1996, TAM bought another airline, Helisul Linhas Aéreas, which used the trade name of TAM. In 1997, TAM ordered its first large jets; the airline ordered 45 planes from Airbus, including 10 A330s, 4 A319s, and 34 A320s. In 1997, the Airbuses began to be delivered and the airline flew its first international service from São Paulo to Miami International Airport. In 1998, TAM purchased the passenger division of Itapemirim Transportes Aéreos.

Two years later, in 1999, services to Europe were inaugurated through a code share service with Air France, to Paris-Charles de Gaulle Airport. In 2000, the airline was renamed TAM Linhas Aéreas. Long running discussions to merge with Varig ended in 2004. In 2008, TAM transported 30,144,000 passengers, with an average load factor of 71%. As of 2010, the airline is owned by the Amaro family (46.25%), Amaro Aviation Part (3.52%), treasury stocks (0.27%), and minority shareholders (49.96%). It employed 24,000 staff. On May 13, 2010, TAM became the 27th member of Star Alliance. David Barioni served as the airline's president from 2007 to 2009.

In 2009, TAM decided to replace its Passenger Service System provided by Sabre, known as Sabresonic, with the Altéa platform from Amadeus. The migration to Altéa was completed in the first quarter of 2010.

On March 30, 2011, TAM signed a letter of intentions to purchase up to 31% of the shares of TRIP Linhas Aéreas, a regional airline which code-shares with TAM since 2004. A final decision had however been postponed; and finally, in February 2012, the purchase agreement was not renewed. On May 28, 2012, TRIP was sold to Azul Brazilian Airlines. Code-sharing operations ended on March 28, 2013.

TAM's last logo (2008-2016) before merging with LAN Airlines

On December 21, 2009, TAM Linhas Aéreas purchased Pantanal Linhas Aéreas. At that time, TAM decided to maintain Pantanal as a separate airline within the TAM Group integrated into the network of TAM. Starting August 1, 2011, Pantanal operated flights on behalf of TAM, all with origin and destination at São-Paulo-Congonhas Airport. On March 26, 2013, Brazilian authorities approved the incorporation of all Pantanal assets by TAM and Pantanal ceased to exist. The incorporation process was completed on August 23, 2013.

In January 2013, the Jet Airliner Crash Data Evaluation Centre (JACDEC) determined that TAM Linhas Aéreas had the second-worst safety record in the world. The ratings take into account the number and deadliness of the hull losses (destroyed airplanes) they have suffered in the past 30 years, how they have fared more recently, and how many flights they have flown without incident. The results do not take into account the cause of the hull losses, or whether the airline is at fault, so they are not a perfect measure of how safely an airline behaves.

=== The creation of LATAM Airlines Group ===
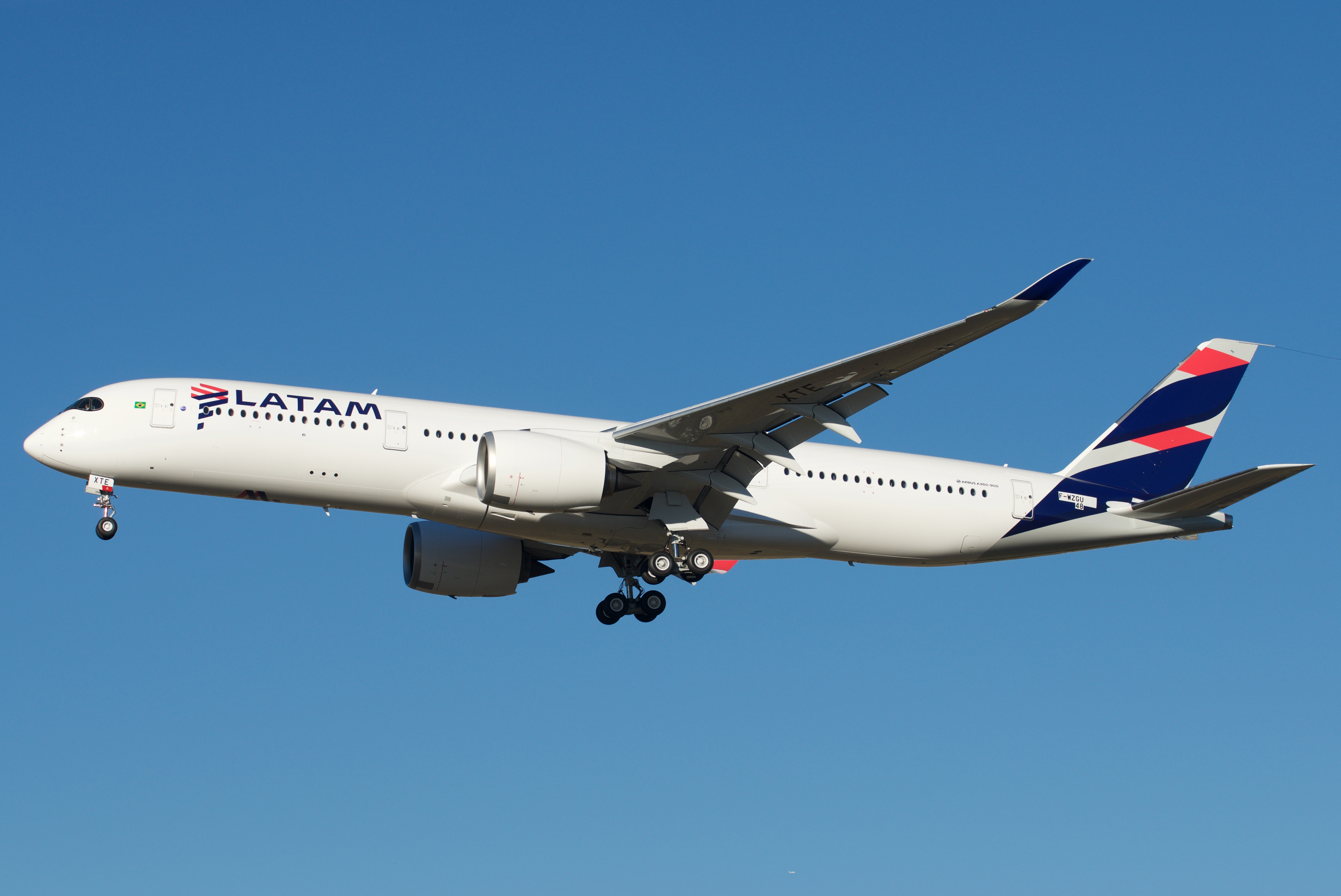
A future LATAM Brasil Airbus A350-900, 2016

On August 13, 2010, TAM signed a non-binding agreement with Chilean airline LAN Airlines to merge and create LATAM Airlines Group. This was changed into a binding agreement on January 19, 2011. LATAM's agreement was approved with 11 restrictions by Chilean authorities on September 21, 2011. These included transferring four slots at São Paulo-Guarulhos to competitors interested in operating flights to Santiago de Chile, renouncing membership to either Oneworld or Star Alliance, restricting increase capacity on flights between Brazil and Chile, and opening code-share possibilities and fidelity program membership to interested competitors. On December 14, 2011, Brazilian authorities approved the agreement imposing similar restrictions as Chilean authorities. By August 2012, LATAM made a decision in favor of Oneworld and frequencies between São Paulo and Santiago de Chile were reduced: TAM had two pairs of slots while LAN had four. LAN ceded two pairs to competitors interested in using them which later was known to be Sky Airline. The merger was completed on June 22, 2012. As of May 5, 2016 TAM adopted the name LATAM. It still continues to use the "TAM" name as a call sign for its LATAM Brasil operated flights.

On July 9, 2020, LATAM Brasil announced that it filed for judicial reorganization in the United States due to the impacts of the COVID-19 crisis on the company's operations. The LATAM Airlines group and its affiliates had already entered the debt restructuring process in May of the same year under the protection of Chapter 11 of the United States bankruptcy law, which allows a deadline for companies to reorganize themselves financially. Despite the announcement, the company continues to operate normally.

=== Subsidiary: LATAM Paraguay ===
In 1994, TAM Linhas Aéreas established a small subsidiary airline in Paraguay called Aerolíneas Paraguayas with a fleet consisting mostly of the Cessna 208 Caravans, formerly operated by TAM. On September 1, 1996, TAM via ARPA, purchased 80% of the shares of the former state-owned Líneas Aéreas Paraguayas and merged it with ARPA. The new airline was named TAM – Transportes Aéreos del Mercosur and maintained the IATA code of LAP, PZ. TAM owned 94.98% and the Paraguayan government 5.02% of the shares.

In 2008, following a branding strategy, the name TAM Mercosur was dropped and the airline adopted an identical corporate identity of TAM Airlines. However, its corporate structure remained the same. The airline was informally known as TAM Paraguay, and used the IATA code PZ. In 2016, the airline was rebranded to LATAM Paraguay, at the same time as all other airlines of the LATAM group.

== Destinations ==
The network of LATAM Brasil and LATAM Paraguay covers Brazil, Paraguay, Africa, Europe, North and South America.
As of June 2026, LATAM Brasil (formerly TAM Linhas Aéreas) operates scheduled services to the destinations below. The list includes destinations formerly served by its subsidiaries, Pantanal Linhas Aéreas and TAM Paraguay:

Country	City	Airport	Notes	Refs
Argentina	Bariloche	Teniente Luis Candelaria International Airport	Seasonal	
Argentina	Buenos Aires	Aeroparque Jorge Newbery		
Argentina	Buenos Aires	Ministro Pistarini International Airport		
Argentina	Córdoba	Ingeniero Aeronáutico Ambrosio L.V. Taravella International Airport		
Argentina	Mendoza	Governor Francisco Gabrielli International Airport		
Argentina	Rosario	Islas Malvinas International Airport		
Argentina	San Miguel de Tucumán	Teniente General Benjamín Matienzo International Airport	Terminated	
Argentina	Ushuaia	Malvinas Argentinas International Airport	Seasonal	
Belgium	Brussels	Brussels Airport		
Bolivia	Cochabamba	Jorge Wilstermann International Airport	Terminated	
Bolivia	La Paz	El Alto International Airport	Terminated	
Bolivia	Santa Cruz de la Sierra	Viru Viru International Airport	Suspended	
Brazil	Aracaju	Santa Maria Airport		
Brazil	Aracati	Dragão do Mar Regional Airport	Terminated	
Brazil	Araçatuba	Dario Guarita State Airport	Terminated	
Brazil	Araraquara	Bartolomeu de Gusmão State Airport	Terminated	
Brazil	Barreiras	Barreiras Airport	Terminated	
Brazil	Bauru	Comte. João Ribeiro de Barros Airport	Terminated	
Brazil	Bauru/Arealva	Noussa Nakhal Tobias State Airport	Terminated	
Brazil	Belém	Val-de-Cans International Airport		
Brazil	Belo Horizonte	Confins–Tancredo Neves International Airport	Focus city	
Brazil	Boa Vista	Atlas Brasil Cantanhede International Airport		
Brazil	Brasília	Pres. Juscelino Kubitschek International Airport	Hub	
Brazil	Cabo Frio	Cabo Frio International Airport	Terminated	
Brazil	Caldas Novas	Nelson Ribeiro Guimarães Airport	Seasonal	
Brazil	Campinas	Viracopos International Airport		
Brazil	Campo Grande	Campo Grande International Airport		
Brazil	Cascavel	Regional West Airport		
Brazil	Caxias do Sul	Hugo Cantergiani Regional Airport		
Brazil	Chapecó	Serafin Enoss Bertaso Airport		
Brazil	Corumbá	Corumbá International Airport	Terminated	
Brazil	Criciúma/Forquilhinha	Diomício Freitas Airport	Terminated	
Brazil	Cuiabá/Várzea Grande	Mal. Rondon International Airport		
Brazil	Curitiba	Afonso Pena International Airport		
Brazil	Fernando de Noronha	Gov. Carlos Wilson Airport		
Brazil	Florianópolis	Hercílio Luz International Airport	Focus city	
Brazil	Fortaleza	Pinto Martins International Airport	Hub	
Brazil	Foz do Iguaçu	Cataratas International Airport		
Brazil	Franca	Ten. Lund Presotto State Airport	Terminated	
Brazil	Goiânia	Santa Genoveva International Airport		
Brazil	Ilhéus	Jorge Amado Airport		
Brazil	Imperatriz	Pref. Renato Moreira Airport		
Brazil	Ipatinga	Vale do Aço Regional Airport	Terminated	
Brazil	Jaguaruna/Criciúma	Humberto Ghizzo Bortoluzzi Airport		
Brazil	Jericoacoara	Comte. Ariston Pessoa Regional Airport		
Brazil	Ji-Paraná	José Coleto Airport	Terminated	
Brazil	João Pessoa	Pres. Castro Pinto International Airport		
Brazil	Joinville	Lauro Carneiro de Loyola Airport		
Brazil	Juazeiro do Norte	Orlando Bezerra de Menezes Airport		
Brazil	Juiz de Fora	Francisco Álvares de Assis Airport	Terminated	
Brazil	Juiz de Fora	Goianá–Pres. Itamar Franco Regional Airport		
Brazil	Lençóis	Cel. Horácio de Mattos Airport	Terminated	
Brazil	Londrina	Gov. José Richa Airport		
Brazil	Macapá	Alberto Alcolumbre International Airport		
Brazil	Maceió	Zumbi dos Palmares International Airport		
Brazil	Manaus	Eduardo Gomes International Airport		
Brazil	Marabá	João Correa da Rocha Airport		
Brazil	Marília	Frank Milenkovich Airport	Terminated	
Brazil	Maringá	Sílvio Name Júnior Regional Airport		
Brazil	Montes Claros	Mário Ribeiro Airport		
Brazil	Natal	Parnamirim–Augusto Severo International Airport	Airport closed	
Brazil	Natal	São Gonçalo do Amarante–Gov. Aluízio Alves International Airport		
Brazil	Navegantes	Min. Victor Konder International Airport		
Brazil	Ourinhos	Jornalista Benedito Pimentel Airport	Terminated	
Brazil	Palmas	Brig. Lysias Rodrigues Airport		
Brazil	Passo Fundo	Lauro Kurtz Airport		
Brazil	Paulo Afonso	Paulo Afonso Airport	Terminated	
Brazil	Pelotas	João Simões Lopes Neto International Airport		
Brazil	Petrolina	Sen. Nilo Coelho Airport		
Brazil	Porto Alegre	Salgado Filho International Airport	Focus city	
Brazil	Porto Seguro	Porto Seguro Airport		
Brazil	Porto Velho	Gov. Jorge Teixeira de Oliveira International Airport		
Brazil	Presidente Prudente	Presidente Prudente State Airport	Terminated	
Brazil	Recife	Guararapes–Gilberto Freyre International Airport	Focus city	
Brazil	Ribeirão Preto	Leite Lopes Airport		
Brazil	Rio Branco	Plácido de Castro International Airport		
Brazil	Rio de Janeiro	Galeão–Antonio Carlos Jobim International Airport	Focus city	
Brazil	Rio de Janeiro	Santos Dumont Airport		
Brazil	Salvador	Dep. Luís Eduardo Magalhães International Airport		
Brazil	Santa Maria	Santa Maria Airport	Terminated	
Brazil	Santarém	Maestro Wilson Fonseca Airport		
Brazil	Santo Ângelo	Sepé Tiaraju Airport	Terminated	
Brazil	São José do Rio Preto	Prof. Eribelto Manoel Reino State Airport		
Brazil	São José dos Campos	Prof. Urbano Ernesto Stumpf International Airport	Terminated	
Brazil	São Luís	Mal. Cunha Machado International Airport		
Brazil	São Paulo	Congonhas–Dep. Freitas Nobre Airport	Hub	
Brazil	São Paulo	Guarulhos–Gov. André Franco Montoro International Airport	Hub	
Brazil	Sinop	Pres. João Figueiredo Airport		
Brazil	Teixeira de Freitas	9 de maio Airport	Terminated	
Brazil	Teresina	Sen. Petrônio Portella Airport		
Brazil	Uberaba	Mário de Almeida Franco Airport	Terminated	
Brazil	Uberlândia	Ten. Cel. Av. César Bombonato Airport		
Brazil	Una	Una-Comandatuba Airport		
Brazil	Uruguaiana	Ruben Berta International Airport	Terminated	
Brazil	Valença	Valença Airport	Terminated	
Brazil	Vilhena	Brig. Camarão Airport	Terminated	
Brazil	Vitória	Eurico de Aguiar Salles Airport		
Brazil	Vitória da Conquista	Glauber Rocha Airport		
Canada	Toronto	Toronto Pearson International Airport	Terminated	
Chile	Santiago	Arturo Merino Benítez International Airport		
Colombia	Bogotá	El Dorado International Airport		
Dominican Republic	Punta Cana	Punta Cana International Airport	Begins 2 July 2026	
France	Paris	Charles de Gaulle Airport		
Germany	Frankfurt	Frankfurt Airport		
Italy	Milan	Milan Malpensa Airport		
Italy	Rome	Leonardo da Vinci–Fiumicino Airport		
Mexico	Cancún	Cancún International Airport	Terminated	
Mexico	Mexico City	Benito Juárez International Airport		
Paraguay	Asunción	Silvio Pettirossi International Airport		
Paraguay	Ciudad del Este	Guaraní International Airport	Terminated	
Netherlands	Amsterdam	Amsterdam Airport Schiphol		
Peru	Lima	Jorge Chávez International Airport		
Portugal	Lisbon	Humberto Delgado Airport		
South Africa	Cape Town	Cape Town International Airport	Begins 2 September 2026	
South Africa	Johannesburg	O. R. Tambo International Airport		
Spain	Barcelona	Josep Tarradellas Barcelona–El Prat Airport		
Spain	Madrid	Adolfo Suárez Madrid–Barajas Airport		
Switzerland	Zürich	Zürich Airport	Terminated	
United Kingdom	London	Heathrow Airport		
United Kingdom	Stanley	RAF Mount Pleasant	Terminated	
United States	Boston	Logan International Airport		
United States	Las Vegas	Harry Reid International Airport	Terminated	
United States	Los Angeles	Los Angeles International Airport		
United States	Miami	Miami International Airport		
United States	New York City	John F. Kennedy International Airport		
United States	Orlando	Orlando International Airport		
Uruguay	Montevideo	Carrasco/General Cesáreo L. Berisso International Airport		
Uruguay	Punta del Este	Capitán de Corbeta Carlos A. Curbelo International Airport	Terminated	
Venezuela	Caracas	Simón Bolívar International Airport	Terminated	

=== Codeshare agreements ===
LATAM Brasil codeshares with the following airlines:

- Aeroméxico
- Air China
- Austrian Airlines
- British Airways
- Cathay Pacific
- Delta Air Lines
- Finnair
- Iberia
- Japan Airlines
- Korean Air
- LATAM Chile
- LATAM Paraguay
- LATAM Perú
- Lufthansa
- Qantas
- Qatar Airways
- South African Airways
- Swiss International Air Lines
- TAP Air Portugal
- Turkish Airlines
- Virgin Atlantic
- Voepass
- Vueling
- WestJet

== Fleet ==
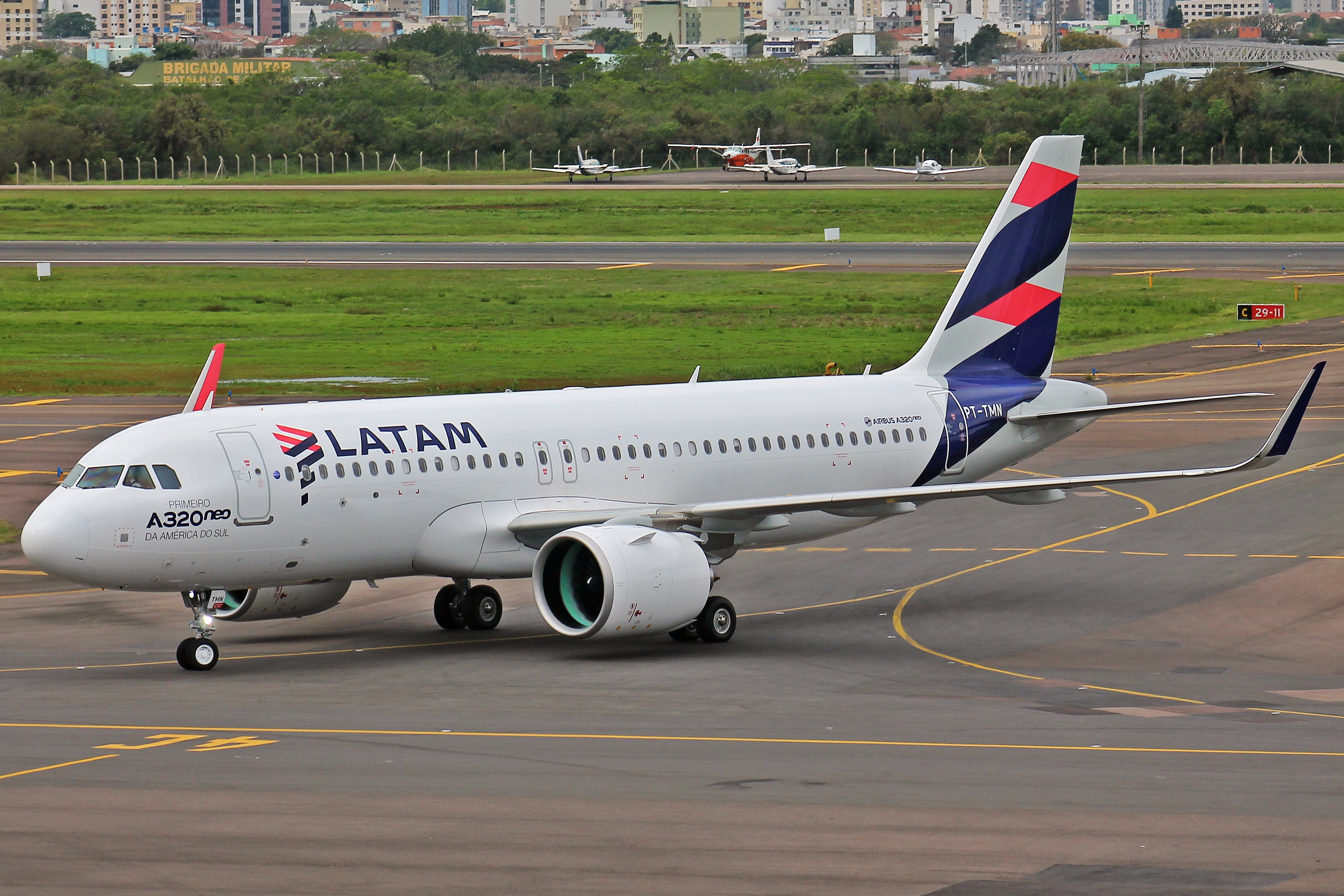
LATAM Brasil Airbus A320neo.

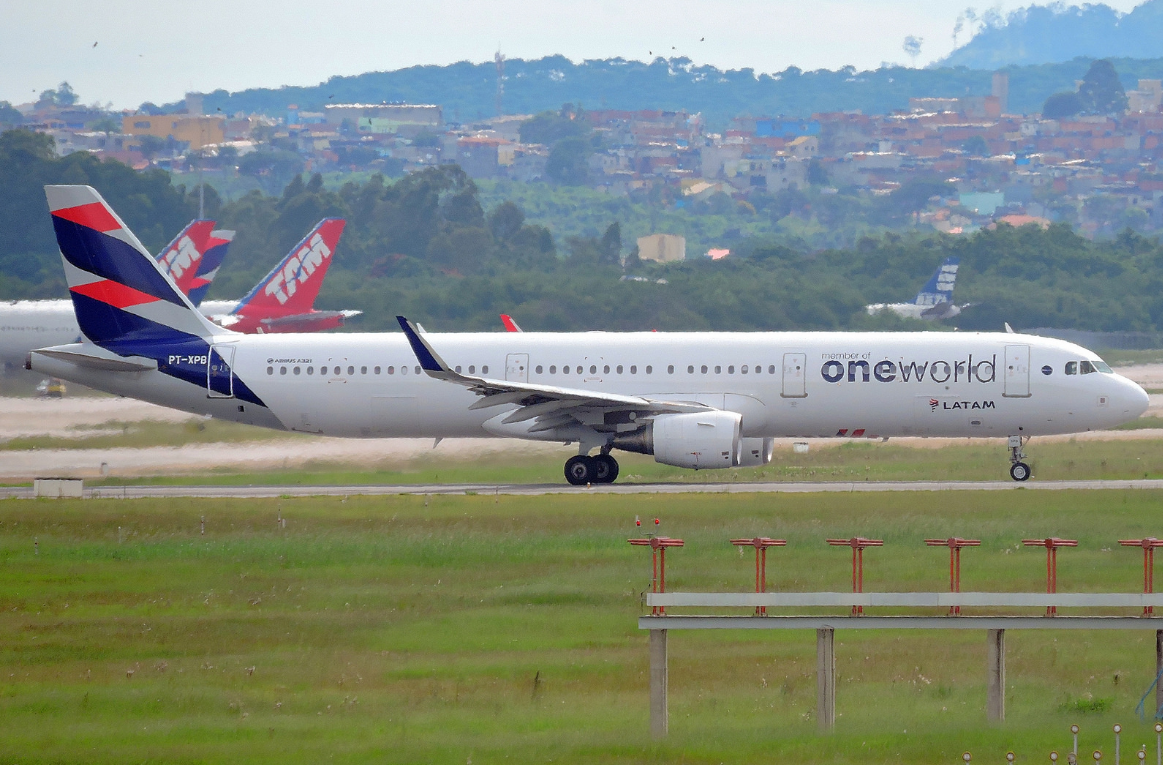
LATAM Brasil Airbus A321-200 in former oneworld livery.

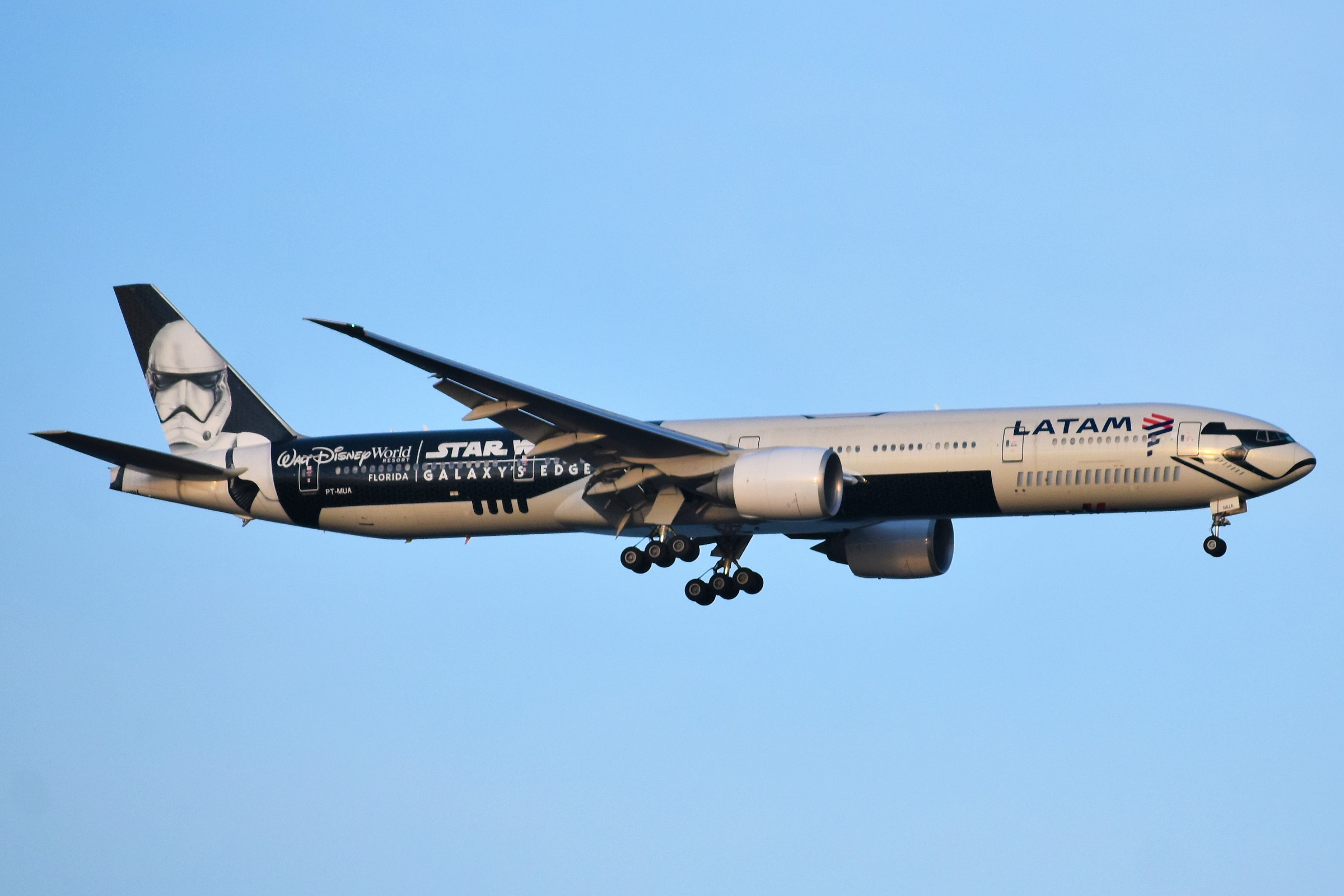
LATAM Brasil Boeing 777-300ER in Star Wars: Galaxy's Edge/Disney World livery.

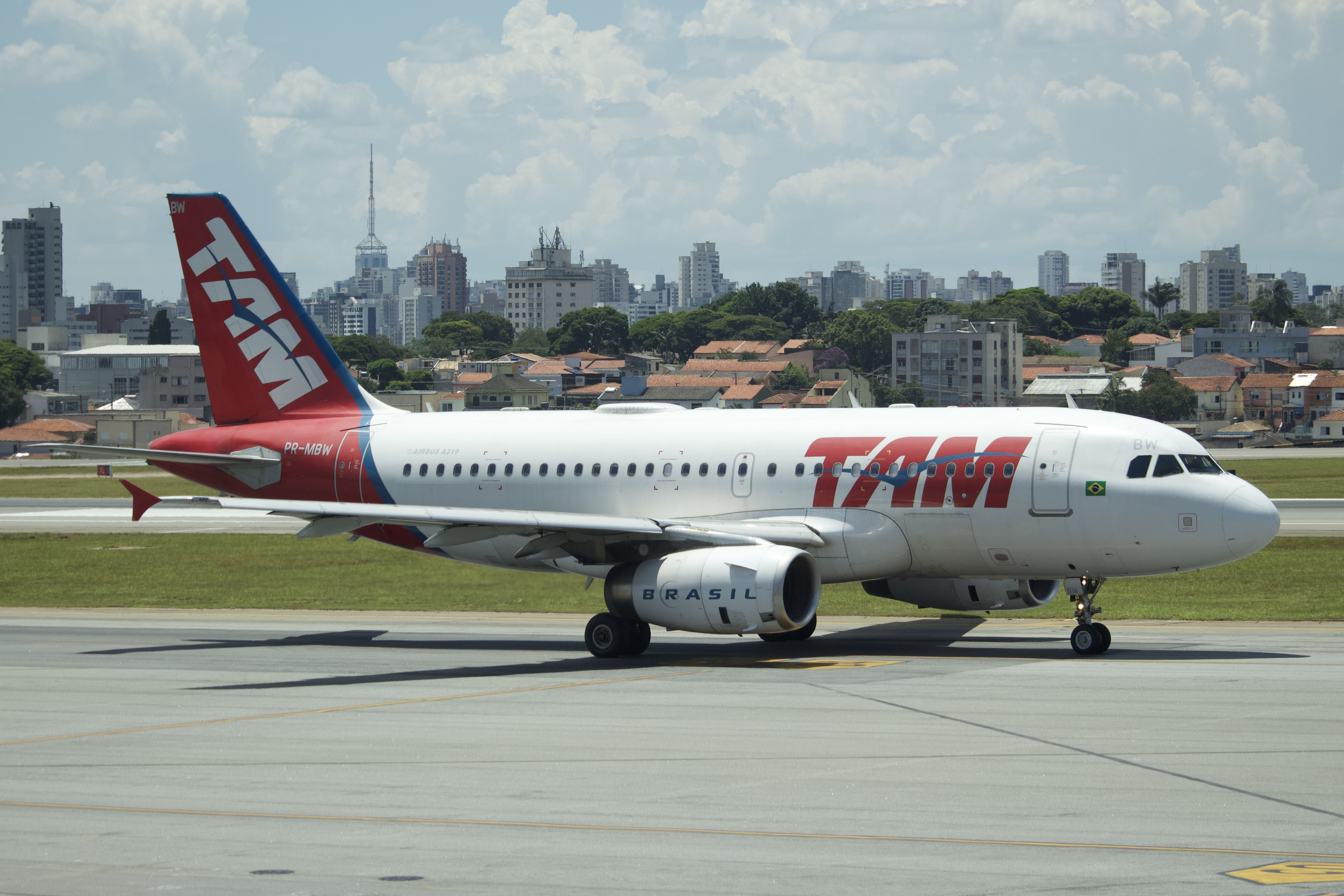
LATAM Brasil Airbus A319 in 2019 still wearing TAM livery.

=== Current fleet ===
As of August 2025, LATAM Airlines Brasil operates the following aircraft:

LATAM Brasil fleet
Aircraft	In service	Orders	Passengers				Notes
Aircraft	In service	Orders	J	W	Y	Total	Notes
Airbus A319-100	19	—	–	–	144	144	Will be replaced by Embraer 195-E2
Airbus A320-200	57	—	–	–	162	162	5 operating for LATAM Paraguay, some will be replaced by Embraer 195-E2
Airbus A320-200	57	—	–	–	174	174	5 operating for LATAM Paraguay, some will be replaced by Embraer 195-E2
Airbus A320-200	57	—	–	–	180	180	5 operating for LATAM Paraguay, some will be replaced by Embraer 195-E2
Airbus A320neo	30	—	–	–	174	174	
Airbus A320neo	30	—	–	–	180	180	
Airbus A321-200	27	—	–	–	224	224	Older aircraft to be replaced by Airbus A321neo.
Airbus A321neo	14	9	–	–	224	224	To replace older Airbus A321-200.
Boeing 777-300ER	10	—	38	50	322	410	
Boeing 787-9	1	—	30	57	216	303	Taken over from LATAM Chile.
Embraer 195-E2	—	24	–	20	116	136	Order with 50 options. Deliveries begin 2026.
Total	170	33					

=== Former fleet ===
LATAM Brasil had also operated these following aircraft since it started services:

LATAM Brasil former fleet
Aircraft	Total	Introduced	Retired	Notes
Airbus A330-200	22	1998	2016	
Airbus A340-500	2	2007	2011	Leased from Air Canada.
Airbus A350-900	13	2016	2021	7 aircraft subleased to Qatar Airways. Replaced by Boeing 787.
Boeing 767-300ER	19	2008	2023	
Cessna 170A	1	1961	Unknown	
Cessna 180	4	1961	Unknown	
Cessna 206 Stationair	1	1961	Unknown	
Cessna 208B Grand Caravan	39	1996	2012	Most operated under the TAM Express brand.
Cessna 402B	4	1972	1979	
Embraer EMB 110 Bandeirante	15	1976	1996	
Fokker F27	10	1980	2000	
Fokker 50	9	1995	2001	
Fokker 100	51	1990	2008	Most were taken from orders of Sempati Air and Pan Am.
Learjet 24	1	1984	Unknown	
Learjet 25	6	1974	Unknown	
Learjet 35	1	2007	Unknown	
McDonnell Douglas MD-11	1	2007	2008	Former Varig aircraft, leased from Boeing Capital.
McDonnell Douglas MD-11ER	2	2007	2008	Former Varig aircraft, leased from Boeing Capital.
Mitsubishi MU-2	1	1994	1999	
Piper PA-31-350 Navajo	1	1976	1984	

=== Fleet development ===
On June 16, 2005, TAM purchased 20 additional Airbus A320 family aircraft (including the A319, A320 and A321), with an additional 20 options. These were expected to be delivered between late 2007 and 2010, adding to the already scheduled delivery of 6 A320s between 2006 and 2008. At the same time, the company signed a memorandum of understanding with Airbus stating its intent to buy 10 of the new Airbus A350-900 plus 5 options, with deliveries planned due to commence at the end of 2014. However, LATAM received its first A350 in early 2016.

TAM has also signed a firm contract with Airbus to acquire 37 additional aircraft. The order comprises 12 A319s, 16 A320s, three A321s and three A330s and includes 12 unspecified extra options. This would bring the number of aircraft in TAM's fleet acquired directly from Airbus to 115 aircraft. The commitments are separate from deals in earlier years for 29 firm-ordered A320s and 20 options. The deliveries were concluded by 2010. In 2013, TAM announced that it would phased out three of the oldest Boeing 767 it operates; however, it later changed plans and decided to keep the aircraft, adding some more aircraft from LAN Airlines instead. They replaced the A330-200s. TAM also received the first aircraft of the A320 family with Sharklets in April 2013.

Fleet maintenance is partially conducted at the technology center at São Carlos Airport.

== Accidents and incidents ==
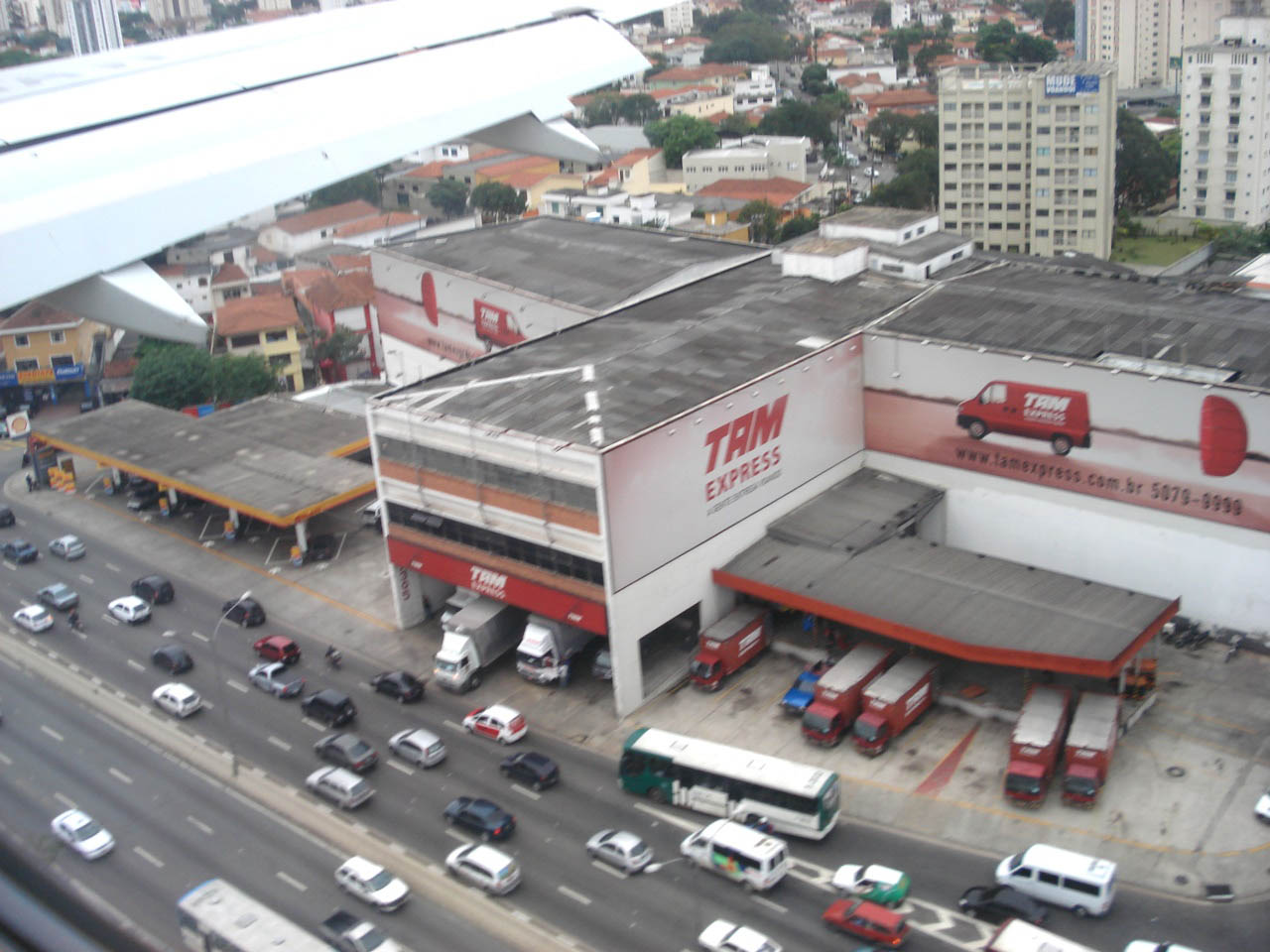
This building across the street from Congonhas-São Paulo Airport and the fuel station seen to the left of it were completely destroyed in a 2007 accident. The building used to host offices and a warehouse for the TAM Express service. A memorial garden and monument now stand at the site.

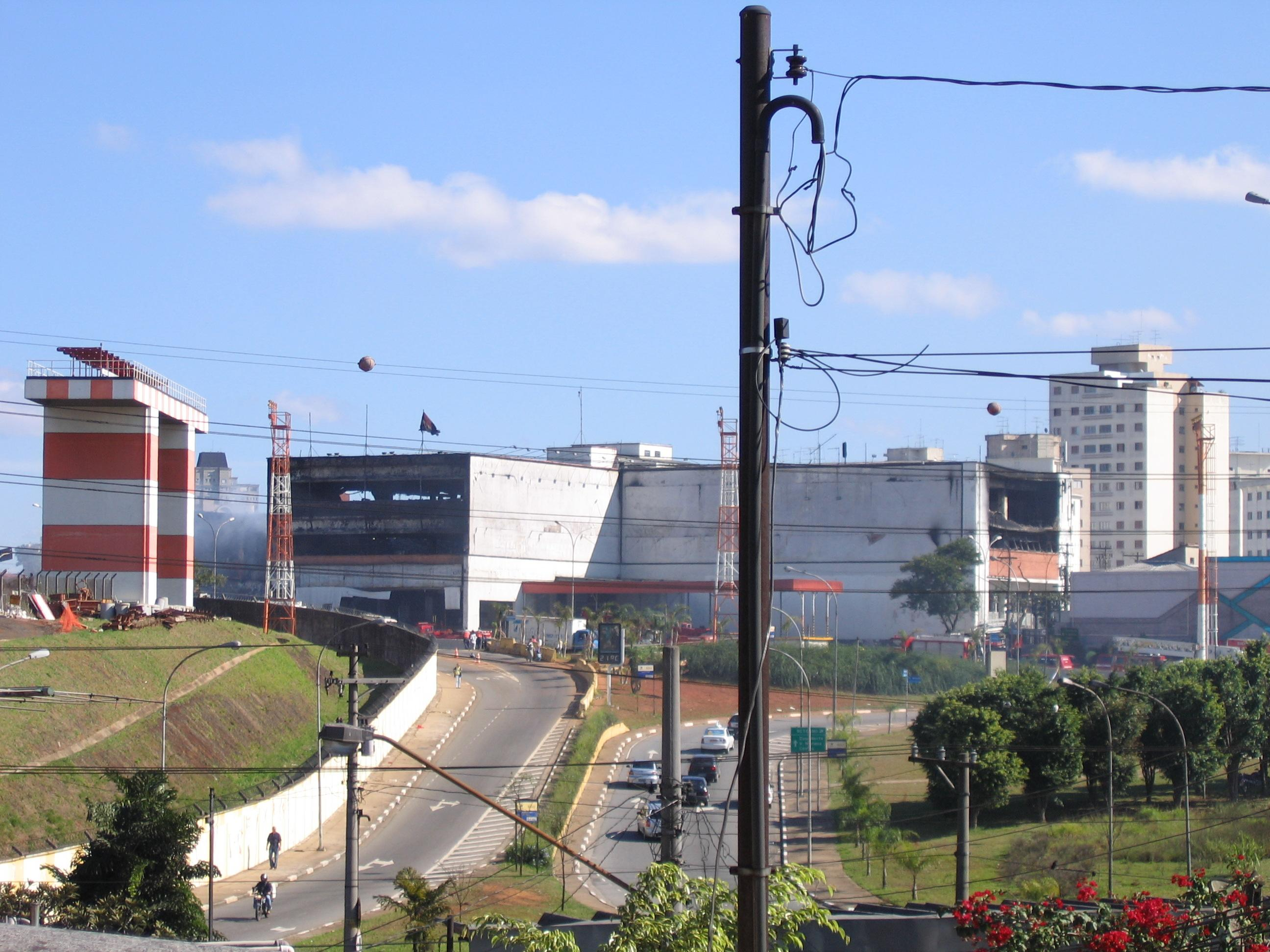
The TAM Express warehouse after the crash of Flight 3054.

- On February 8, 1979, an Embraer EMB 110 Bandeirante (PT-SBB) operating a flight from Bauru to São Paulo-Congonhas, while on initial climb from Bauru, struck trees and crashed into flames. Two crew and 16 passengers died.
- On October 7, 1983, an Embraer EMB 110C Bandeirante (PP-SBH) flying from Campo Grande and Urubupungá to Araçatuba struck the ground just short of the runway threshold after missing the approach at Araçatuba Airport twice. Seven crew and passengers died.
- On June 28, 1984, an Embraer EMB 110C Bandeirante (PP-SBC) operating a chartered flight by Petrobras from Rio de Janeiro-Galeão to Macaé flew into São João Hill while descending through rain and clouds over the Municipality of São Pedro da Aldeia. All 16 passengers and 2 crew died. The passengers were journalists of well-known Brazilian networks who were preparing a special report about the Campos Basin oil fields.
- On February 12, 1990, a Fokker F27 (PT-LCG) operating as Flight 540 from São Paulo-Congonhas to Bauru, due to faulty approach procedures, touched down at Bauru 775 meters (2,543 ft; 848 yd) past the runway threshold. The pilot was unable to initiate a go-around procedure and went past the end of the runway, hitting a car that was passing on a road nearby. One crew member and two occupants of the car died.
- On October 31, 1996, a Fokker 100 (PT-MRK) and operating as Flight 402 from São Paulo-Congonhas to Rio de Janeiro-Santos Dumont crashed into an urban area during takeoff procedures and after engine no. 2 suffering at least three uncommanded reverse thrust deployments and thus losing power, stalled, rolled to the right and struck two buildings. All 95 passengers and crew on board and 4 people on the ground died.
- On July 9, 1997, a Fokker 100 (PT-WHK) operating Flight 283 was on a daily route between Vitória and São Paulo, with a stopover in São José dos Campos, suffered a sudden explosion between seats 18 and 20, which opened a 4-square-meter (43 sq ft) hole in its fuselage and threw engineer Fernando Caldeira de Moura Campos out of the plane. The passenger fell from a height of 2,400 meters (7,874 ft), at a speed of 100 meters per second (330 ft/s), creating a 1-meter (3.3 ft) diameter fault in the ground, in a cassava plantation in the city of Suzano, where he was found. According to the cadaveric report, despite the explosion, it is very likely that Fernando arrived alive and lucid to the ground. Days later, the Federal Police of Brazil indicted unemployed professor Leonardo Teodoro de Castro, who was also traveling on the aircraft, as the author of the explosion. Leonardo, however, could not be judged for what happened, because days after the explosion he was run over by a bus and is in a vegetative state.
- On September 15, 2001, a Fokker 100 (PT-MRN) operating the charter Flight 9755, flying from Recife to São Paulo-Congonhas via Campinas-Viracopos, following an uncontrolled engine failure en route to Campinas, had three cabin windows shattered by fragments of the engine and made an emergency landing at Belo Horizonte-Confins. One passenger was sucked out partly and held by another passenger until the aircraft landed. The passenger did not survive.
- On July 17, 2007, an Airbus A320-200 (PR-MBK) operating Flight 3054 from Porto Alegre to São Paulo-Congonhas overran the runway while landing at Congonhas, crossed a major thoroughfare and impacted against a TAM Express warehouse. All 187 passengers and crew perished, as did 12 people on the ground.
- On September 28, 2018, an empty Airbus A320 (PT-MZJ) of more than 18 years old, got off the pusher truck during towing at the São Paulo-Congonhas and the rear hit a palm and other trees. The palm crushed the right rear wing.
- On December 20, 2018, a Boeing 777-300ER (PT-MUG) operating as LA8084 from São Paulo-Guarulhos to London Heathrow suffered a serious electrical fault inflight, subsequently diverting to Belo Horizonte International Airport. There were no reported injuries or fatalities. The aircraft was repaired and returned to service.
- On July 9, 2024, a Boeing 777-300ER with 398 people on board operating as Flight 8073, sustained a tailstrike while attempting to take off from Milan-Malpensa Airport in Italy. There were no fatalities or injuries reported, but the aircraft received significant damage. The aircraft returned back to its origin airport. The takeoff performance calculation by the pilots resulted in a V1 speed of 145 knots and a VR speed of 149 knots. Thirty-eight seconds after commencing the takeoff roll, the nose lifted at a speed of 151 knots. The aircraft failed to rotate and five seconds later a "tail strike" warning was generated in the cockpit. The aircraft finally lifted off the runway at 180 knots. In a preliminary report ANSV stated that erroneous takeoff parameters were used to calculate the takeoff speeds. VR was in fact 181 knots, not 149. Runway 35L, which was the runway it took off from, was closed for inspection as a result of the accident.

== Subsidiaries ==
=== Active ===
- Multiplus Fidelidade is the customer loyalty network. On November 8, 2011, Multiplus and the Canadian company Aimia (which also administers Air Canada's loyalty program Aeroplan) established a joint-venture to create in Brazil a third company that would administer loyalty schemes of other companies.
- LATAM Airlines Paraguay
- LATAM Cargo Brasil provides cargo services.
- LATAM Travel
- TAM Aviação Executiva provides air services for business executives.
- TAM Museum is a museum of vintage aircraft located in São Carlos and maintained by TAM Group.
- TAM Viagens provides vacation package services for Brazilians, while TAM Vacations provides vacation package services for Americans.

=== Defunct ===
- Aerolíneas Paraguayas
- Cine TAM was a cinema in São Paulo owned by the airline.
- Itapemirim Transportes Aéreos
- Pantanal Linhas Aéreas
- Programa Fidelidade
- TAM Transportes Aéreos del Mercosur
- TAM Transportes Aéreos Meridionais
- TAM Transportes Aéreos Regionais
  - TAM Transportes Aéreos Express
- TAM Express Courier Service
- TAM Paraguay

== See also ==
- Brasil Central Linhas Aéreas
- Helisul Linhas Aéreas
- List of airlines of Brazil
