= SBTC =

SBTC may refer to:

- San Bernardino Transit Center
- Small Business in Transportation Coalition
- Skill-biased technological change
- Southern Baptists of Texas Convention, a state convention of the Southern Baptist Convention which broke away from the larger Baptist General Convention of Texas during the "conservative-moderate" issues of the 1980-1990 timeframe-
- St. Benedict Technology Symposium is a non-profit organization that provide other non-profits with technical support. They operate in the Chicago area.
- S.B.T.C, the initials at end of the killing of JonBenét Ramsey ransom note.
- Una-Comandatuba Airport
