= Pantanal Linhas Aéreas =

Brazilian airline

Pantanal Linhas Aéreas Sul-Matogrossenses

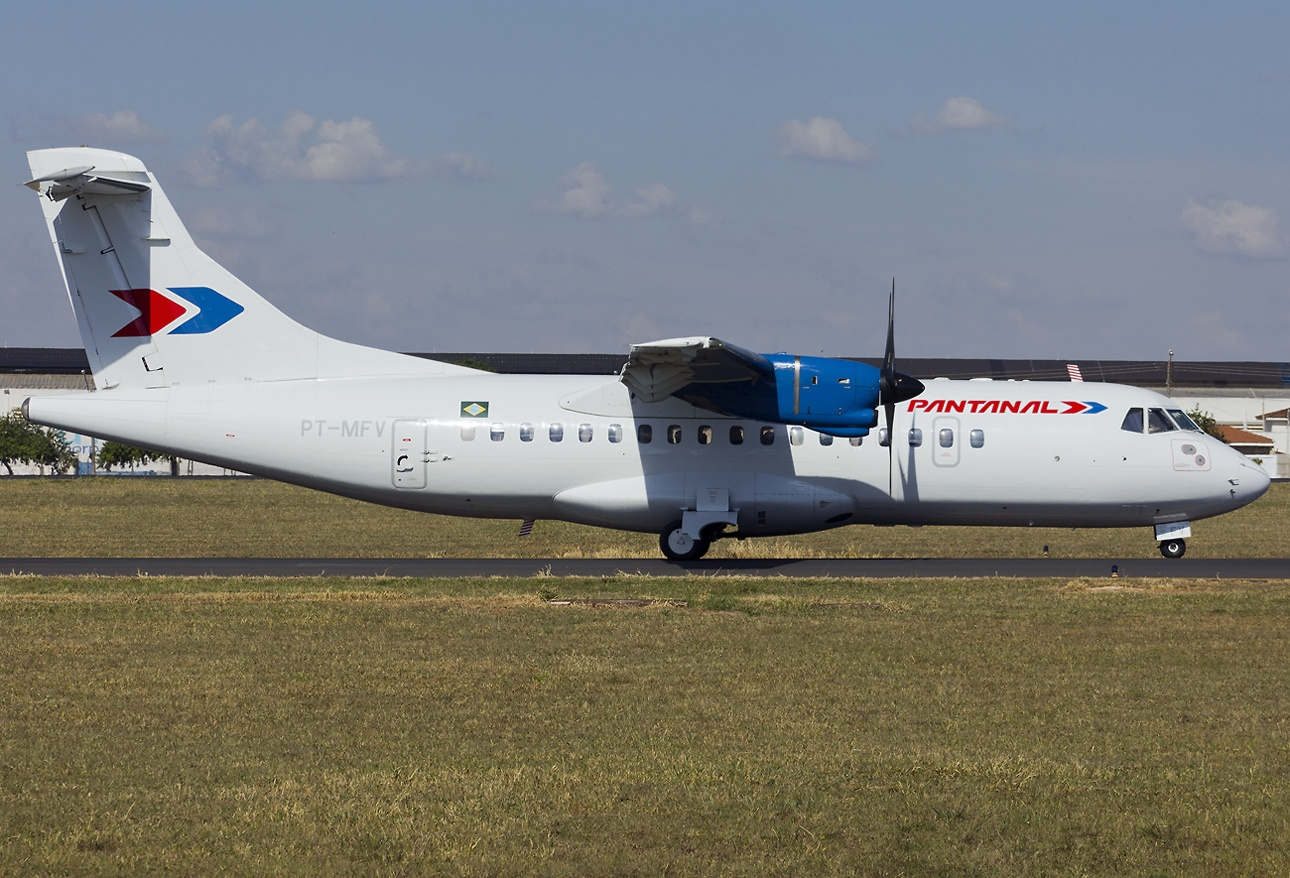
IATA	ICAO	Call sign
GP	PTN	PANTANAL
- Founded: 1990
- Commenced operations: April 12, 1993
- Ceased operations: August 23, 2013
- Hubs: Congonhas-São Paulo Airport
- Frequent-flyer program: TAM Fidelidade
- Parent company: TAM Linhas Aéreas
- Headquarters: São Paulo, Brazil
- Key people: Marcos Sampaio Ferreira
- Website: www.voepantanal.com.br

Pantanal Linhas Aéreas S.A. was a regional airline based in São Paulo, Brazil and incorporated by TAM Linhas Aéreas in 2013. It served destinations mainly in the southeast region of Brazil from its bases at Congonhas and Guarulhos airports in São Paulo.

== History ==
The origins of Pantanal Linhas Aéreas are in Pantanal Taxi Aéreo, an air taxi company created in 1989 in Campo Grande, Mato Grosso do Sul. This company, operating regular charter flights, provided convenient connections of cities in the Central-West Region of Brazil with flights of TAM Linhas Aéreas, which also provided two of the three Embraer EMB 110 Bandeirante of the fleet. In fact, as TAM Linhas Aéreas grew and dropped services to smaller cities, Pantanal became a viable solution for connectivity.

In 1990, the Brazilian Government partially deregulated the market and changed its airline concession policies, allowing the creation of new airlines. At this point, Marcos Sampaio Ferreira decided to transform his air taxi company into a regular airline with operations independent from those of TAM Linhas Aéreas. The leased Bandeirantes were returned to TAM, and in 1992, the first Embraer EMB 120 Brasilia was received. With new aircraft and a new logo identity, depicting a Jabiru locally known as tuiuiú, regular flights started on April 12, 1993.

It became the first Brazilian airline to introduce the ATR 42 aircraft in December 1993. In 1995 it won a government concession for transportation of Petrobras employees and cargo through the Amazon region.

With growing services, in 1996 Pantanal transferred its maintenance base from Campo Grande to Curitiba-Bacacheri, which at the time became its hub. The same year, in partnership with Total and Interbrasil STAR, Pantanal created the shuttle service between Rio de Janeiro-Santos Dumont and Belo Horizonte-Pampulha. The year ended with 18 destinations being served.

One of the consequences of the fast growth of Pantanal was the change of its logo, which, starting in 1997, depicted two arrows and no longer a Jabiru. The intention was to leave behind the idea of a purely regional carrier. The same year also brought a big blow to the operations of Pantanal: the National Civil Aviation Agency of Brazil closed Curitiba-Bacacheri Airport for regular flights. Pantanal had developed a hub and established its maintenance base at this facility. Having no other choice, Pantanal transferred its base to São Paulo-Congonhas Airport and changed its market focus to the Southeast and South regions of Brazil, eliminating destinations and increasing frequencies among the remaining.

Since TAM Linhas Aéreas ceased to operate purely regional flights in December 1998, Pantanal and TAM established feeding and code-share agreements for the second time. Services were concentrated at São Paulo-Congonhas Airport using the airline's precious slots at this airport. Those agreements were suspended in 2001 due to the death of Rolim Amaro, president of TAM and a friend of the president of Pantanal, and to the economic crisis that followed thereafter.

Pantanal never regained economic stability and the crisis reached the limit in the beginning of 2009 when Pantanal applied for judicial reorganization to the Commercial Bankruptcy and Reorganization Court in São Paulo. Pantanal continued to provide services despite its financial troubles.

Redemption came once again via TAM Linhas Aéreas: taking into account their long-lasting partnership and particularly the slots of Pantanal at São Paulo-Congonhas airport, on December 21, 2009, TAM Linhas Aéreas purchased Pantanal Linhas Aéreas. At that time, TAM decided to maintain Pantanal as a separate airline within the TAM Group, integrated into its network. The base of the ATR 42 aircraft was changed to São Paulo-Guarulhos Airport, and Pantanal slots at Congonhas were used by "TAM flights operated by Pantanal." In 2010, IATA changed the designator of Pantanal Linhas Aéreas from P8 to GP.

According to the National Civil Aviation Agency of Brazil (ANAC) in August 2010, Pantanal had 0.20% of the domestic market share in terms of passengers per kilometre flown. Starting September 2010, Pantanal ceased to appear independently on statistics and its data were integrated into the ones of TAM Group, which then comprised TAM Linhas Aéreas and Pantanal Linhas Aéreas.

Starting August 1, 2011, all Pantanal flights were operated on behalf of TAM using equipment leased from TAM, and finally, on March 26, 2013, Brazilian authorities approved the incorporation of all Pantanal assets by TAM, and Pantanal ceased to exist. The incorporation process was finalized on August 23, 2013.

== Destinations ==
Pantanal Linhas Aéreas operated scheduled services to the following destinations:

- Araçatuba – Dario Guarita Airport
- Araraquara – Bartolomeu de Gusmão Airport
- Assis – Marcelo Pires Halzhausen Airport
- Barretos – Chafei Amsei Airport
- Bauru
  - Bauru Airport
  - Moussa Nakhl Tobias Airport (Bauru/Arealva)
- Belo Horizonte
  - Pampulha/Carlos Drummond de Andrade Airport
  - Pres. Tancredo Neves International Airport (Confins)
- Brasília – Pres. Juscelino Kubitschek International Airport
- Caldas Novas – Nélson Ribeiro Guimarães Airport
- Campinas – Viracopos International Airport
- Campo Grande – Campo Grande International Airport
- Caravelas – Caravelas Airport
- Castilho – Urubupungá/Ernesto Pochler Airport
- Caxias do Sul – Hugo Cantergiani Airport
- Corumbá – Corumbá International Airport
- Criciúma/Forquilhinha – Diomício Freitas Airport
- Cuiabá – Mal. Rondon International Airport
- Curitiba
  - Afonso Pena International Airport
  - Bacacheri Airport
- Dourados – Francisco de Matos Pereira Airport
- Florianópolis – Hercílio Luz International Airport
- Fortaleza – Pinto Martins International Airport
- Foz do Iguaçu – Cataratas International Airport
- Franca – Ten. Lund Presetto Airport
- Goiânia – Santa Genoveva Airport
- Governador Valadares – Cel. Altino Machado de Oliveira Airport
- Ilhéus – Jorge Amado Airport
- Ipatinga – Usiminas Airport
- João Pessoa – Pres. Castro Pinto International Airport
- Juiz de Fora – Francisco Álvares de Assis Airport (Serrinha)
- Lins – Gov. Lucas Nogueira Garcez Airport
- Marília – Frank Miloye Milenkowichi Airport
- Maringá – Sílvio Name Júnior Regional Airport
- Mucuri – Max Feffer Airport
- Paranaguá – Santos Dumont Airport
- Ponta Porã – Ponta Porã International Airport
- Porto Alegre – Salgado Filho International Airport
- Porto Seguro – Porto Seguro Airport
- Presidente Prudente – Presidente Prudente Airport
- Recife – Guararapes/Gilberto Freyre International Airport
- Ribeirão Preto – Dr. Leite Lopes Airport
- Rio de Janeiro
  - Galeão/Antonio Carlos Jobim International Airport
  - Santos Dumont Airport
- Rio Verde – Gal. Leite de Castro Airport
- Rondonópolis – Maestro Marinho Franco Airport
- Salvador da Bahia – Dep. Luís Eduardo Magalhães International Airport
- São José do Rio Preto – Prof. Eribelto Manoel Reino Airport
- São Paulo
  - Congonhas Airport Hub
  - Guarulhos/Gov. André Franco Montoro International Airport
- Sorocaba – Bertram Luiz Leupolz Airport
- Teresina – Sen. Petrônio Portella Airport
- Uberaba – Mário de Almeida Franco Airport
- Uberlândia – Ten. Cel. Av. César Bombonato Airport
- Varginha – Major-Brigadeiro Trompowsky Airport
- Videira – Ângelo Ponzoni Airport
- Vilhena – Brig. Camarão Airport

== Fleet ==
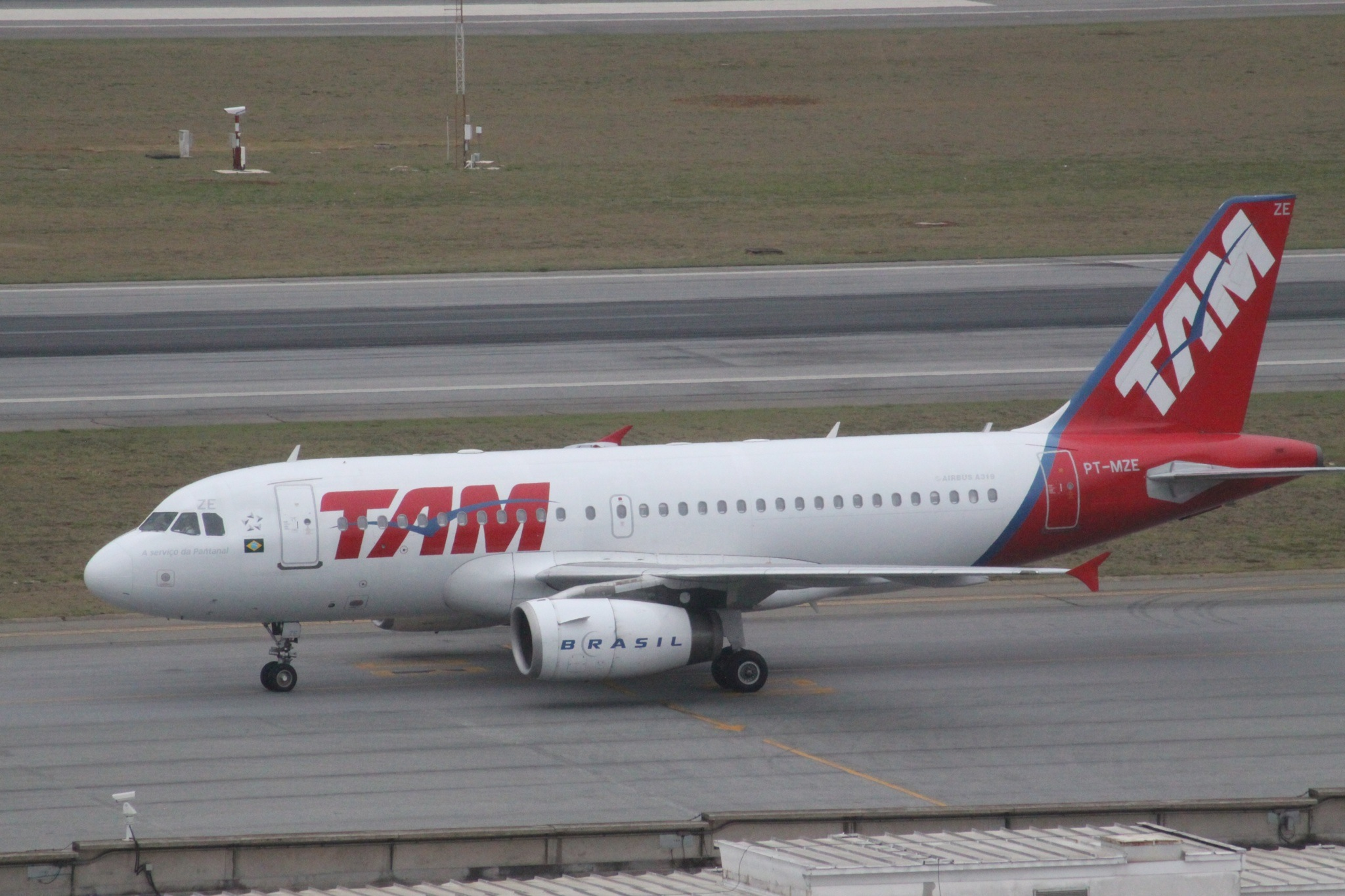
A Airbus A319-100 of TAM at São Paulo–Congonhas Airport, operating for Pantanal. Notice on the nose that reads "A serviço da Pantanal".

Pantanal Linhas Aéreas fleet
Aircraft	Total	Years of operation	Notes
Embraer EMB 110 Bandeirante	3	1993–1997	Two leased from TAM Linhas Aéreas
Embraer EMB 120 Brasilia	4	1993–1997	
Beechcraft 1900C	1	1993–1994	
ATR 42-300	14	1993–2011	One written off as flight 4763
Airbus A319-100	2	2010–2013	Leased from TAM Linhas Aéreas
Airbus A320-200	1	2010–2013	Leased from TAM Linhas Aéreas

== Airline affinity program ==
Between 2009 and 2013, Pantanal was part of TAM Fidelidade, the affinity program of TAM Linhas Aéreas.

== Accidents and incidents ==
On July 16, 2007, Pantanal Linhas Aereas Flight 4763, an ATR 42-300, registration PT-MFK, skidded off runway 17R while landing at Sao Paulo-Congonhas Airport, veering to the left onto the grass beside it, destroying a concrete box and a light pole. The cause was determined to be poor weather (rainy conditions on approach) and a lack of grooves imprinted into the runways, resulting in the plane hydroplaning and unable to slow down. Just one day later, TAM Airlines Flight 3054 would crash on the same runway, killing 199 people, in what would be Brazil's worst aviation disaster.

== See also ==
- List of defunct airlines of Brazil
