= Una-Comandatuba Airport =

Una-Comandatuba Airport Aeroporto de Una-Comandatuba
- IATA: UNA; ICAO: SBTC; LID: BA0067

Summary
- Airport type: Private
- Owner: Hotéis Transamérica
- Operator: Socicam
- Serves: Una
- Time zone: BRT (UTC−03:00)
- Elevation AMSL: 7 m (23 ft)
- Coordinates: 15°21′12″S 038°59′50″W
- Website: www.socicam.com.br/aeroportos/?la=br

Map
- Location in Brazil

Runways
Direction	Length		Surface
Direction	m	ft	Surface
02/20	2,000	6,562	Asphalt
- Sources: Website, ANAC, DECEA

Una-Comandatuba Airport (IATA: UNA, ICAO: SBTC), is the airport serving Una, Brazil and particularly the Transamérica Resort located in Comandatuba Island.

It is owned by Hotéis Transamérica and operated by Socicam.

== History ==
The airport was commissioned in 1977.

== Airlines and destinations ==
Airlines	Destinations
Azul Brazilian Airlines	Belo Horizonte–Confins, São Paulo–Congonhas

== Access ==
The airport is located 10 minutes by boat shuttle from Transamérica Resort located in the adjoining Comandatuba island and 16 km (10 mi) from downtown Una.

== See also ==
- List of airports in Brazil
