= São Paulo–Congonhas Airport =

Domestic airport in São Paulo, Brazil

São Paulo/Congonhas–Deputado Freitas Nobre Airport Aeroporto de São Paulo/Congonhas–Deputado Freitas Nobre
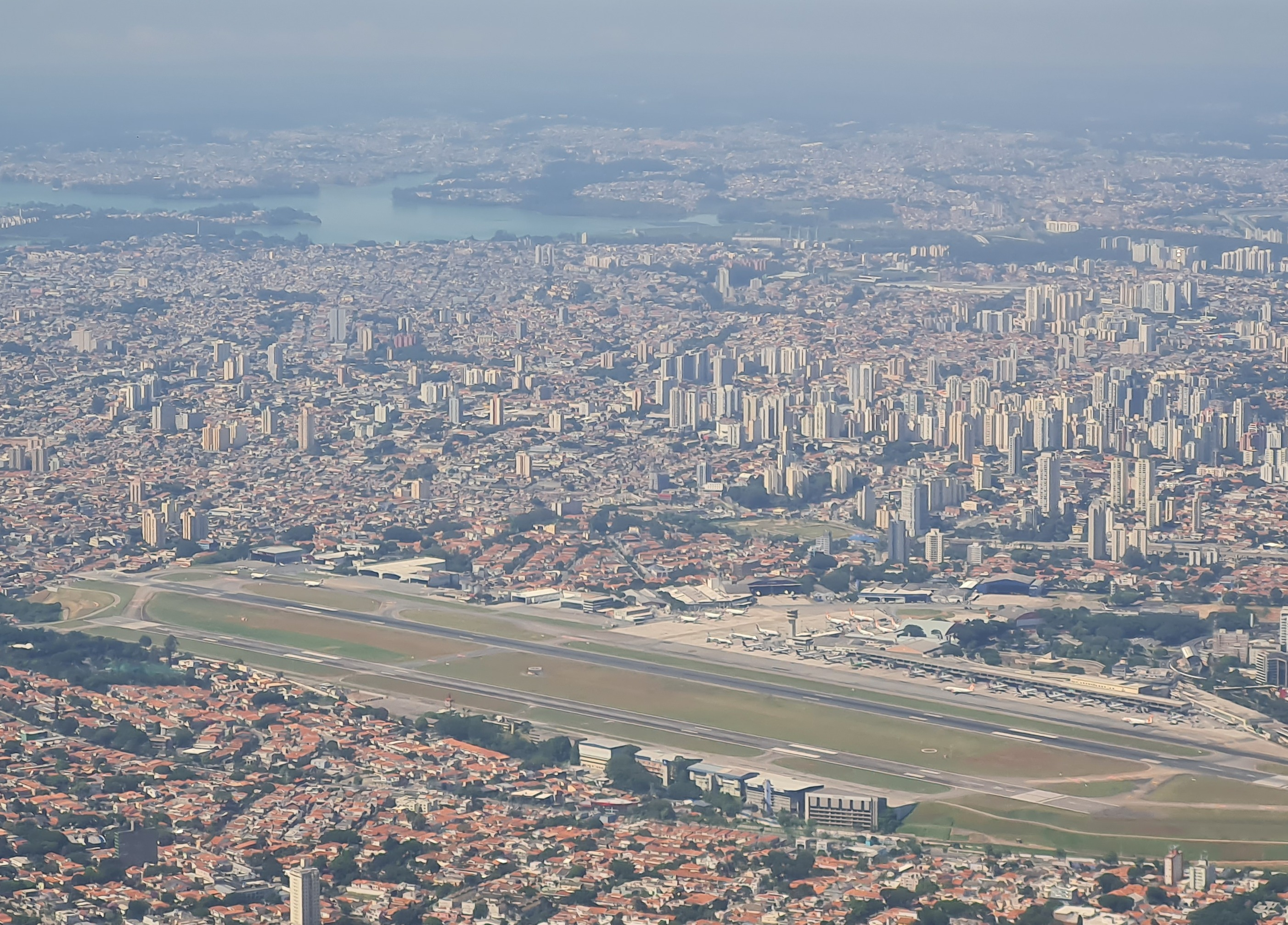
- Aerial view of the airport in 2024
- IATA: CGH; ICAO: SBSP; LID: SP0001

Summary
- Airport type: Public
- Operator: Infraero (1977–2022); AENA (2022–present)
- Serves: São Paulo
- Opened: 12 April 1936; 90 years ago
- Hub for: Gol Linhas Aéreas; LATAM Brasil
- Focus city for: Azul Brazilian Airlines
- Time zone: BRT (UTC−03:00)
- Elevation AMSL: 803 m (2,635 ft)
- Coordinates: 23°37′34″S 046°39′23″W
- Website: www.aenabrasil.com.br/pt/aeroportos/aeroporto-de-congonhas/index.html

Maps
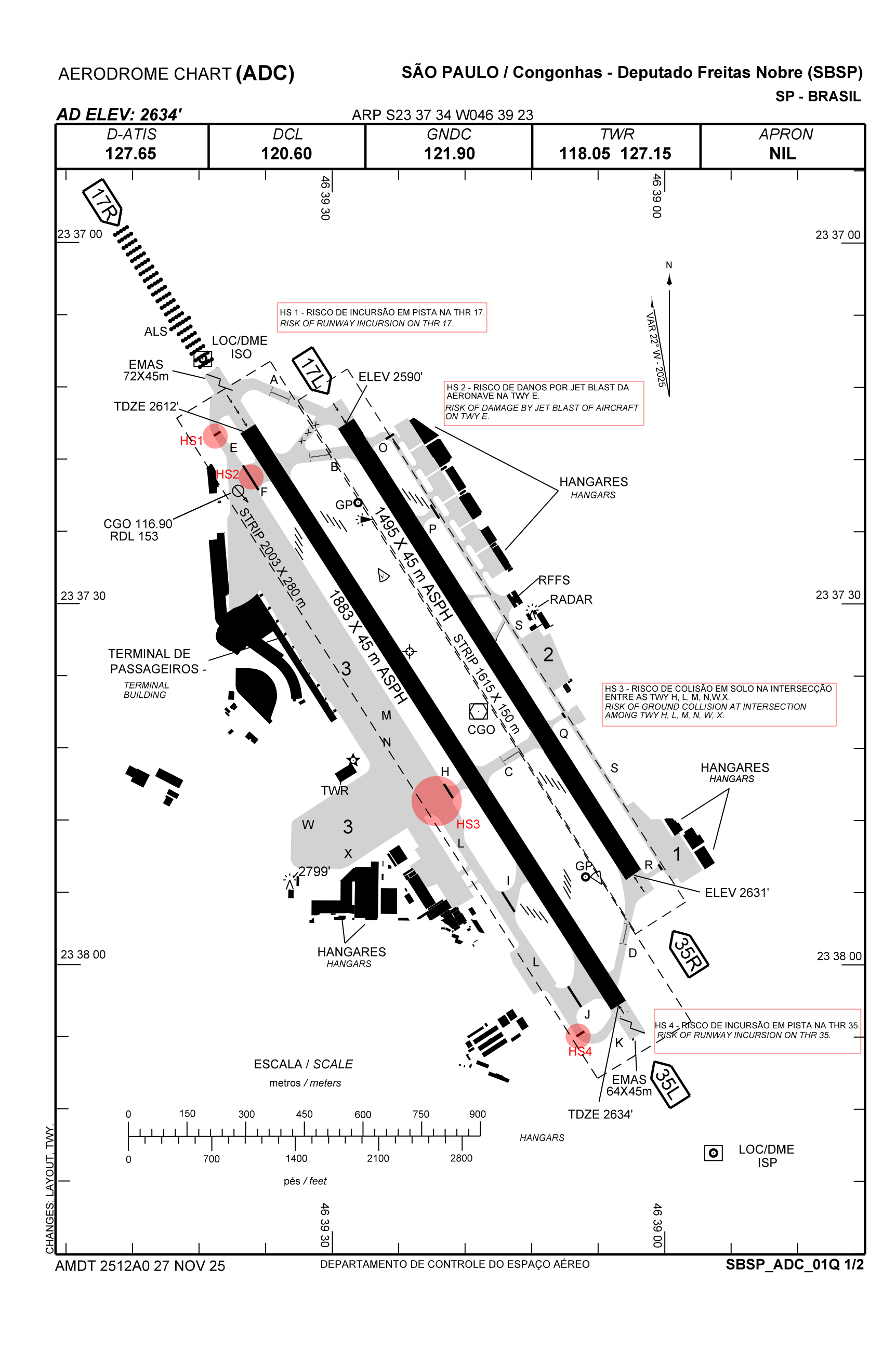
- DECEA airport chart

- Location in São Paulo CGH (São Paulo State) CGH (Brazil)

Runways
Direction	Length		Surface
Direction	m	ft	Surface
17R/35L	1,883	6,173	Asphalt
17L/35R	1,495	4,905	Asphalt

Statistics (2025)
- Passengers: 24,491,178 ▲6%
- Aircraft Operations: 214,951 ▼8%
- Metric tonnes of cargo: 55,230 ▲30%
- Statistics: AENA; Sources: ANAC, DECEA

São Paulo/Congonhas–Deputado Freitas Nobre Airport (IATA: CGH, ICAO: SBSP) (Portuguese pronunciation: [kõˈɡõɲɐs]) is one of the four commercial airports serving São Paulo, Brazil. The airport is named after the neighborhood where it is located, called Vila Congonhas, property of the descendants of Lucas Antônio Monteiro de Barros (1767–1851), Viscount of Congonhas do Campo, first president of the province of São Paulo after the independence of Brazil in 1822, during the Empire. In turn, the Viscount's domain was named after the plural of a shrub known in Brazil as congonha-do-campo (Luxemburgia polyandra, of the Ochnaceae family). Since 19 June 2017, it is officially named after Deputy José Freitas Nobre. The name Congonhas, however, remains mostly used. It is owned by the City of São Paulo.

The airport is operated by AENA.

Congonhas has slot restrictions operating with a maximum of 30 operations/hour, being one of the five airports with such restrictions in Brazil. In 2022, it was the second busiest airport in Brazil by passenger traffic, after São Paulo–Guarulhos.

== History ==
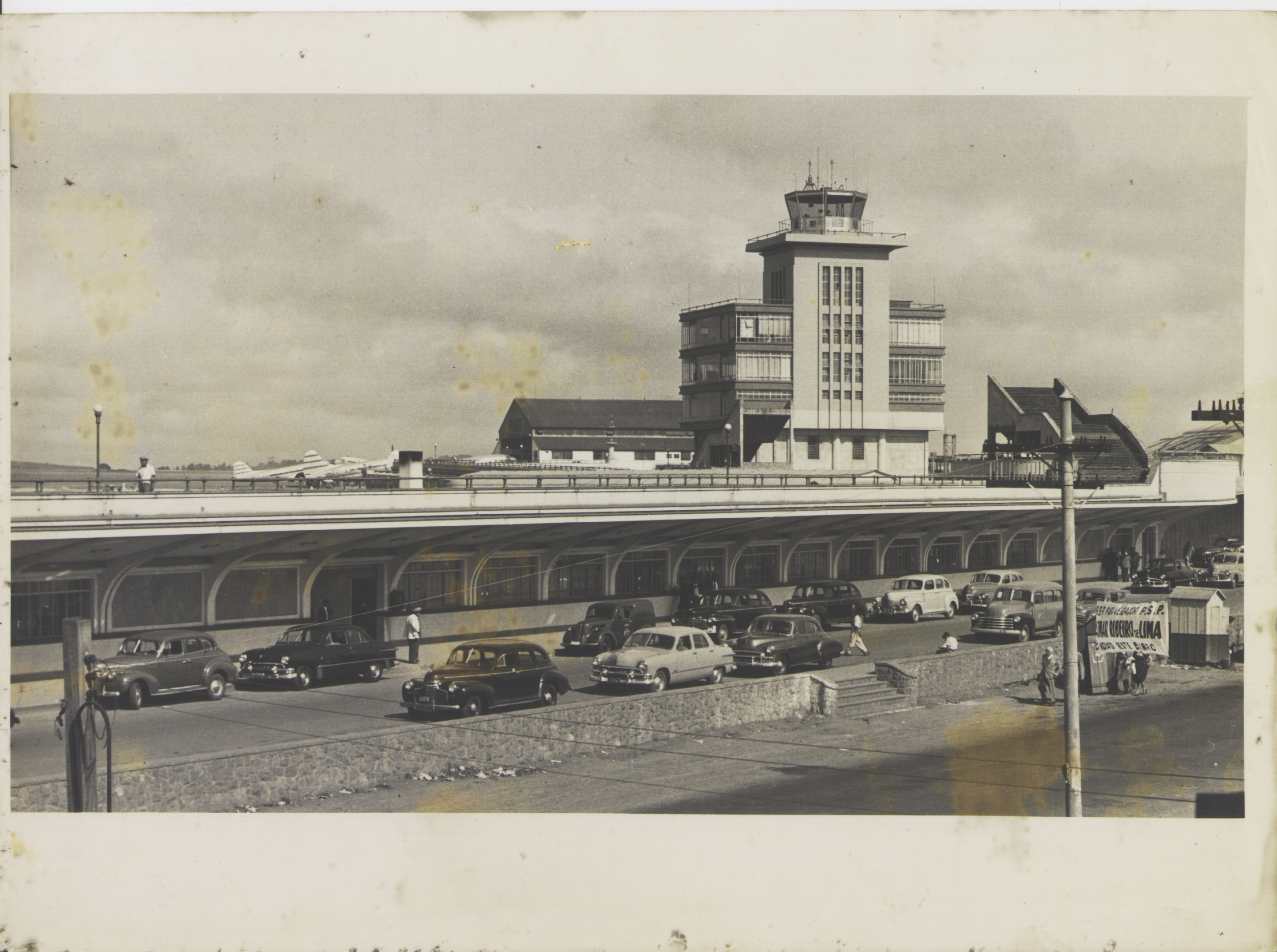
The classic historical modern architecture passenger terminal of Congonhas airport

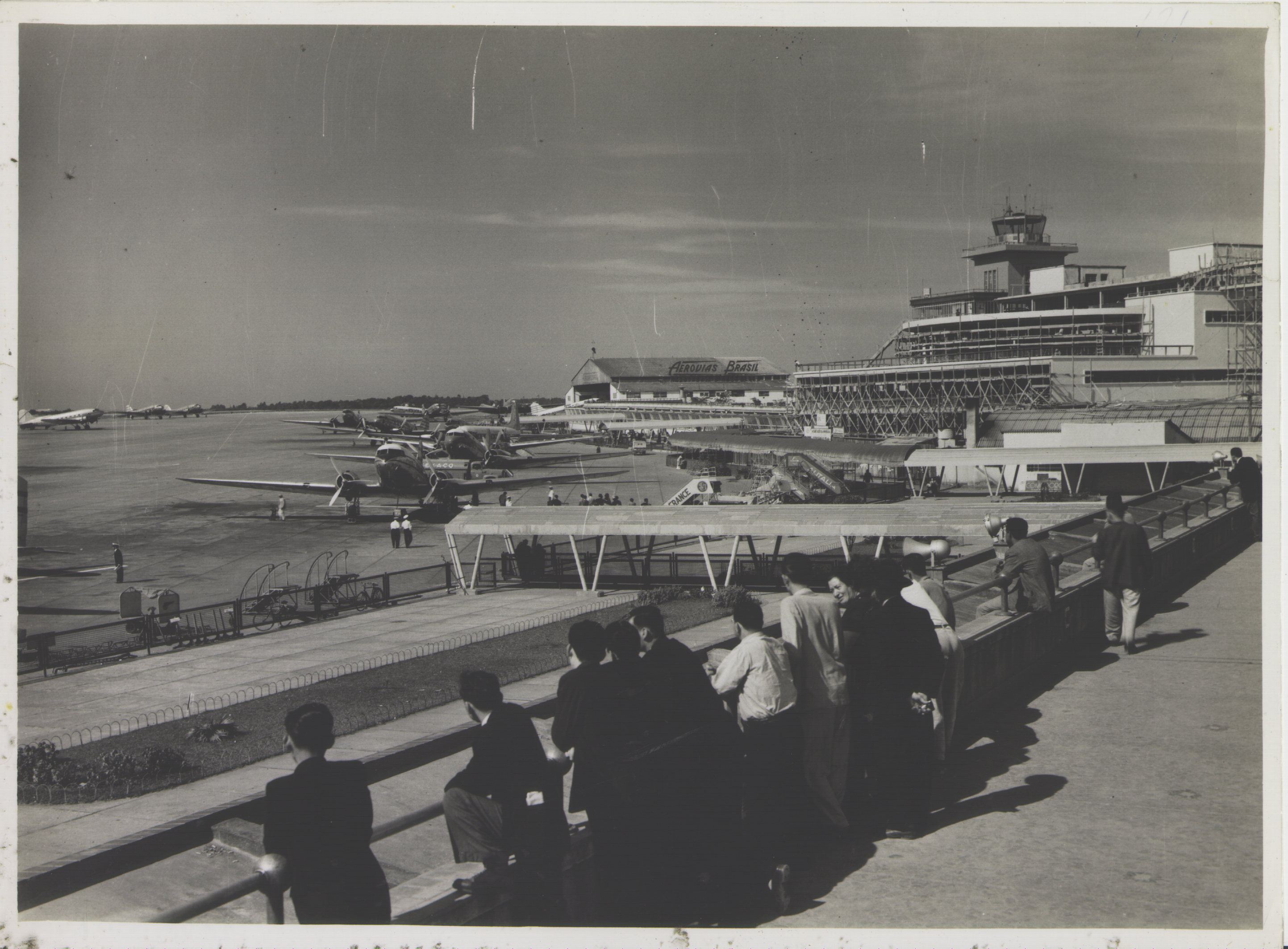
Congonhas in the 1950s

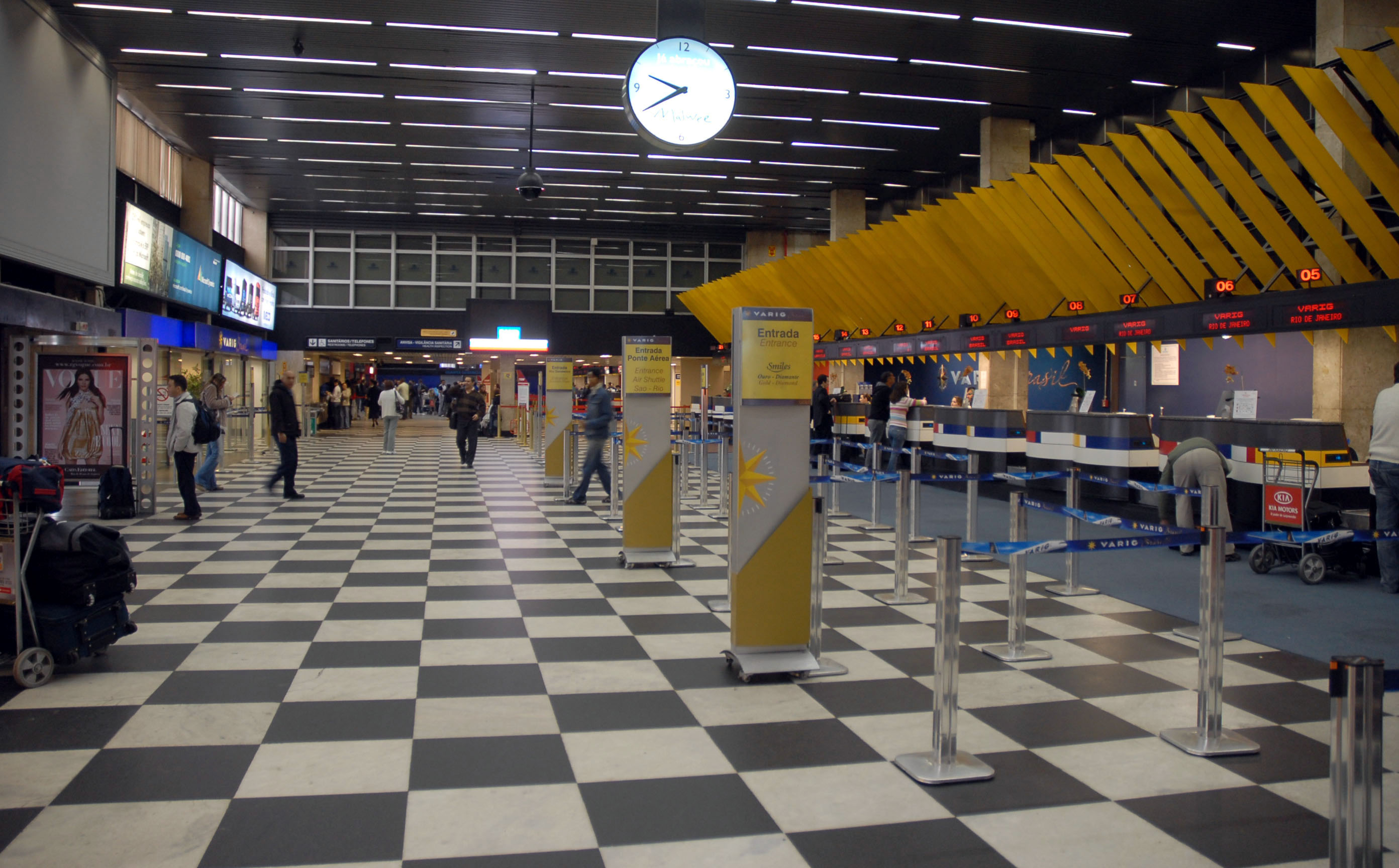
The classic but highly modified modern architecture in the check in hall of Congonhas Airport

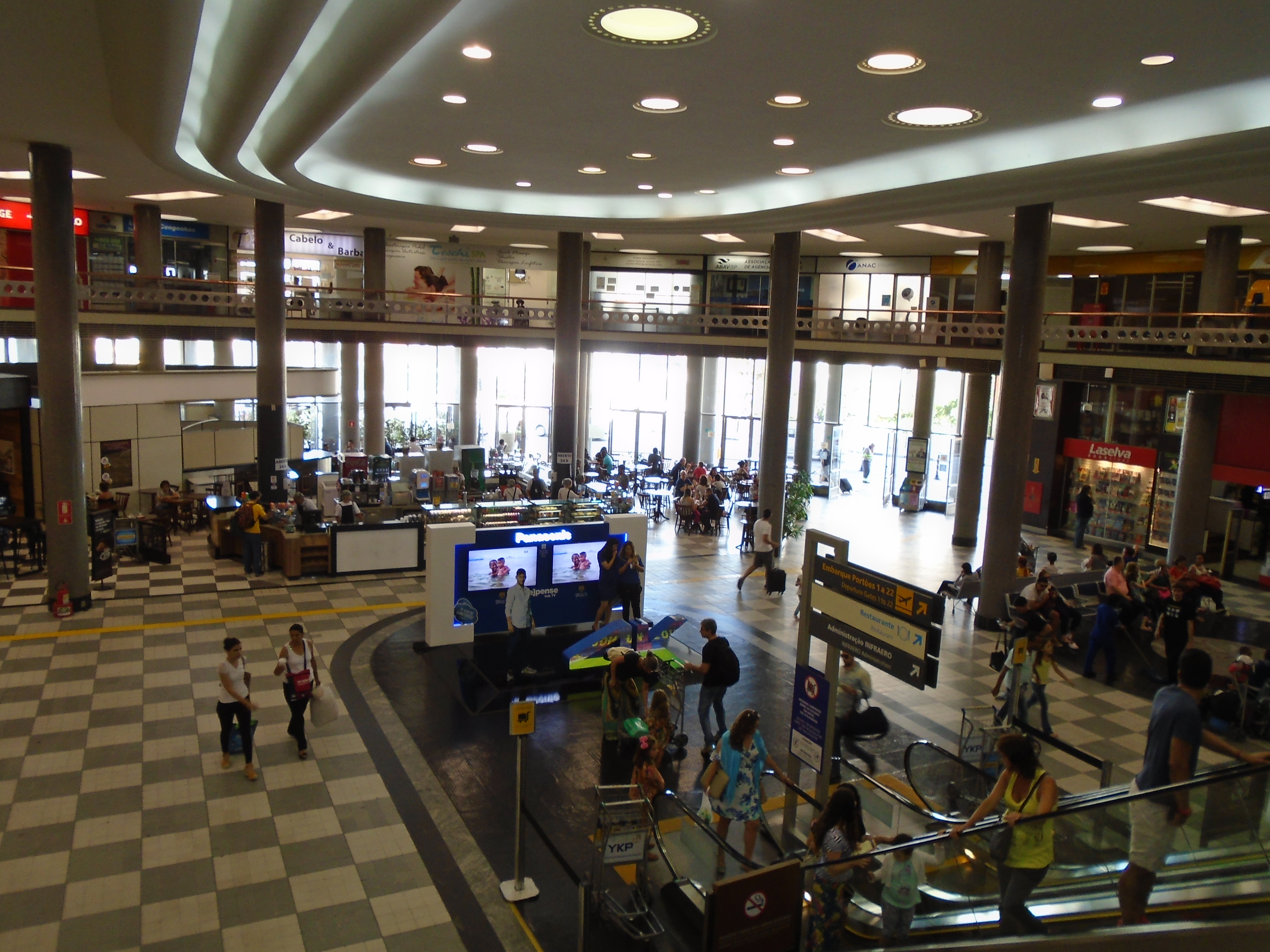
Congonhas terminal view inside

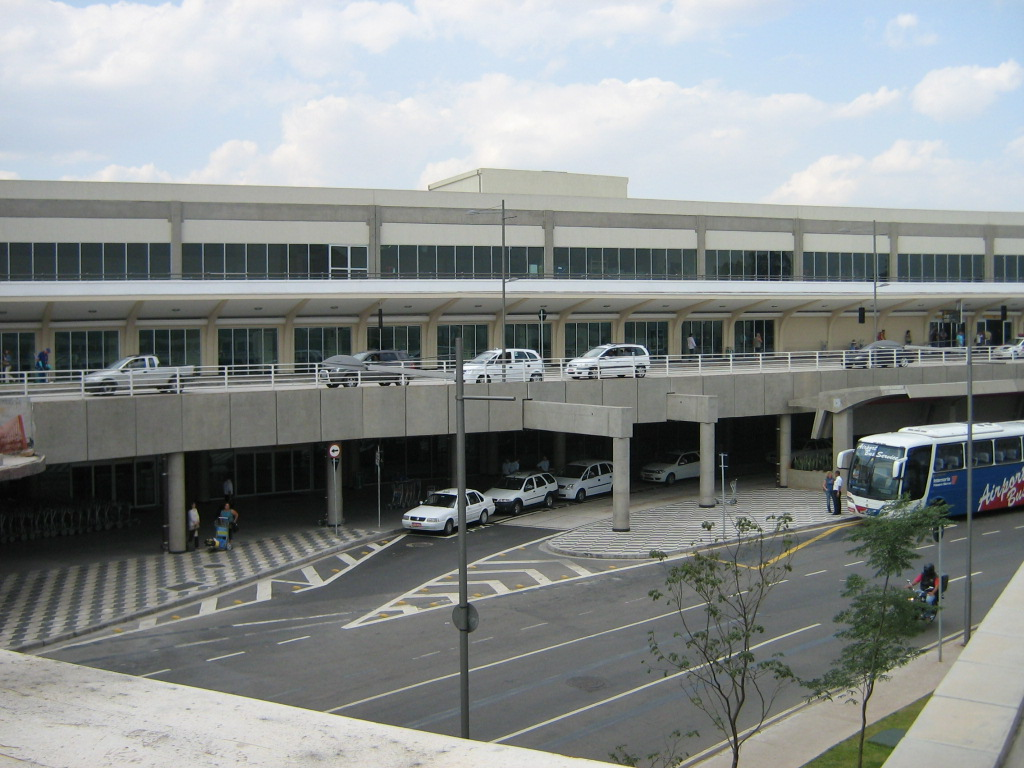
View of Terminal 1

The airport was initially planned in 1919, but it did not open until 12 April 1936. The site was outside the built-up urban area at the time, and it was chosen because it had favourable winds and lay on a high hill with little vegetation. The airport was opened with a 300-metre (984-ft.) long dirt runway. In the beginning it was the private airport of VASP, built as an alternative to Campo de Marte which, already at that time, had operational difficulties. VASP started services to Rio de Janeiro on 5 August 1936, advertising two daily round trips of 90 minutes' flight time in each direction, starting a route that would eventually become one of the world's busiest. By 1957, the airport was the third busiest in the world for air cargo. During the 1950s, Congonhas served all international flights to/from São Paulo, as its runways could accommodate the Lockheed Constellations, Douglas DC-6s, and Douglas DC-7s in use at that time. As early jets such as the Convair 880, Convair 990, Boeing 707 and Douglas DC-8 were bought by airlines, all long-haul travel shifted to Viracopos Airport, and the European airlines left Congonhas.

On 21 May 1959, a formal agreement between Varig, Cruzeiro do Sul and VASP created the shuttle service to Rio de Janeiro that made the airport famous, being the first of its kind in the world. The service was called Air Bridge (Portuguese: Ponte Aérea), inspired on the Berlin Airlift; its first flight was operated on 6 July 1959. It operated between Rio de Janeiro–Santos Dumont and Congonhas Airports and comprised regular departures, usually every half-hour, a common check-in counter and simplified tickets and formalities. The service was an instant success. Sadia, later known as Transbrasil, joined the partnership in 1968. In 1999 the service was discontinued, as more competitive economic times made airlines decide to operate their services independently on that route.

Until 1985, Congonhas was the main airport of São Paulo operating domestic flights, as well as international service to neighbouring countries such as Argentina, Uruguay, Paraguay, Chile, Peru and Bolivia. Due to Congonhas' short runways, unable to accommodate most long-haul jets, intercontinental flights required changing planes at Rio de Janeiro–Galeão or were operated at Viracopos Airport. However, Viracopos' distant location, in Campinas, 97 km (60 mi) from downtown São Paulo, made that choice inconvenient both for passengers and for airlines, so a connection in Rio was usually preferred.

Since the opening of Guarulhos Airport in 1985, international flights no longer operate from Congonhas, and domestic operations have undergone restrictions. Congonhas remains important to the city for regional and short-distance domestic flights. Given the concentration of Brazil's economy in the Central-Southern region, where São Paulo is located, such flights make up the greatest share of the country's domestic air traffic. Therefore, even after Guarulhos International Airport was opened, Congonhas continued to face congestion problems, regarding both the number of passengers and the number of flight operations. Yet the convenience of its short distance from downtown and from the major business areas of Paulista, Faria Lima and Luís Carlos Berrini avenues still makes Congonhas a favorite of passengers, especially business travelers.

The former airport administrator, Infraero, started in 2003 a comprehensive renovation plan of the airport complex. A remodeling of departure and arrival halls with installation of 12 jetways was completed on 15 August 2004. In December 2005, a new parking garage was opened. The runways were resurfaced between February and September 2007. Runway length has not been extended because of the rapid growth of São Paulo, which has completely surrounded the airport.

The airport has been troubled by slippery runways and had several accidents where water accumulation has been a significant factor, the most notable being TAM Airlines Flight 3054 on 17 July 2007, which killed 199 people. Although the main runway had been repaved in June 2007, its new rainwater drainage grooves were only finished in September 2007. As a consequence of this accident and the subsequent public outcry for better safety performance and noise reduction, the airport's operations were significantly altered, through restrictions in the number of landing slots, flight distances, and operating times (presently from 6:00 to 22:30 hours). Furthermore, the maximum allowable gross weight of aircraft was reduced. In the past, the airport used to have operations with Douglas DC-8 Vasp Cargo, Airbus A300 wide-body aircraft by the now-defunct airlines Cruzeiro do Sul, Varig, and VASP, and Boeing 767-200 of also former Trans-Brasil; the largest aircraft now operating at Congonhas are the Airbus A320 and the Boeing 737-800. As a result of the scaled-down operations, Congonhas lost its designation as an international airport in 2008.

On 31 August 2009, Infraero unveiled a R$164.7 million (US$86.8 million; EUR 60.8 million) investment plan to up-grade Congonhas Airport focusing on the preparations for the 2014 FIFA World Cup, which were held in Brazil, São Paulo being one of the venue cities. The investment involved a new control tower, renovation of the apron, conclusion of the renovation on the south portion of the passenger terminal, and renovation of the north portion of the passenger terminal.

The central hall of the passenger terminal is considered one of the most outstanding examples of modern architecture in São Paulo. However, modernizing and enlargement work has been conducted at the terminal from 2003 onwards, while trying to preserve the look of the older, historic section. Today the main terminal has 51,535 m^{2} (554,718 sq.ft) of space.

Previously operated by Infraero, on 18 August 2022, the consortium AENA won a 30-year concession to operate the airport.

== Airlines and destinations ==
Airlines	Destinations
Azul Brazilian Airlines	Belo Horizonte–Confins, Brasília, Cuiabá, Curitiba, Fortaleza, Foz do Iguaçu, João Pessoa, Maceió, Natal, Porto Alegre, Porto Seguro, Recife, Rio de Janeiro–Santos Dumont, Una-Comandatuba; Seasonal: Aracaju, Ilhéus, Navegantes, Salvador da Bahia
Gol Linhas Aéreas	Aracaju, Araçatuba, Belo Horizonte–Confins, Bonito (ends 30 January 2027), Brasília, Campo Grande, Caxias do Sul, Chapecó, Correia Pinto/Lages, Cuiabá (ends 10 December 2026), Curitiba, Florianópolis, Fortaleza, Foz do Iguaçu, Goiânia, Ilhéus, João Pessoa, Joinville, Juiz de Fora, Londrina, Maceió, Maringá, Montes Claros, Natal, Navegantes, Palmas (ends 11 December 2026), Pelotas, Porto Alegre, Porto Seguro, Presidente Prudente, Recife, Ribeirão Preto (ends 31 January 2027), Rio de Janeiro–Galeão, Rio de Janeiro–Santos Dumont, Salvador da Bahia, São José do Rio Preto, Uberlândia, Vitória; Seasonal: Caldas Novas, São Luís
LATAM Brasil	Belo Horizonte–Confins, Brasília, Campo Grande, Caxias do Sul, Cuiabá, Curitiba, Florianópolis, Fortaleza, Foz do Iguaçu, Goiânia, Ilhéus, João Pessoa, Joinville, Londrina, Maceió, Maringá, Natal, Navegantes, Porto Alegre, Porto Seguro, Recife, Ribeirão Preto, Rio de Janeiro–Santos Dumont, Salvador da Bahia, São José do Rio Preto, São Luís, Teresina, Uberlândia, Vitória; Seasonal: Aracaju

== Statistics ==
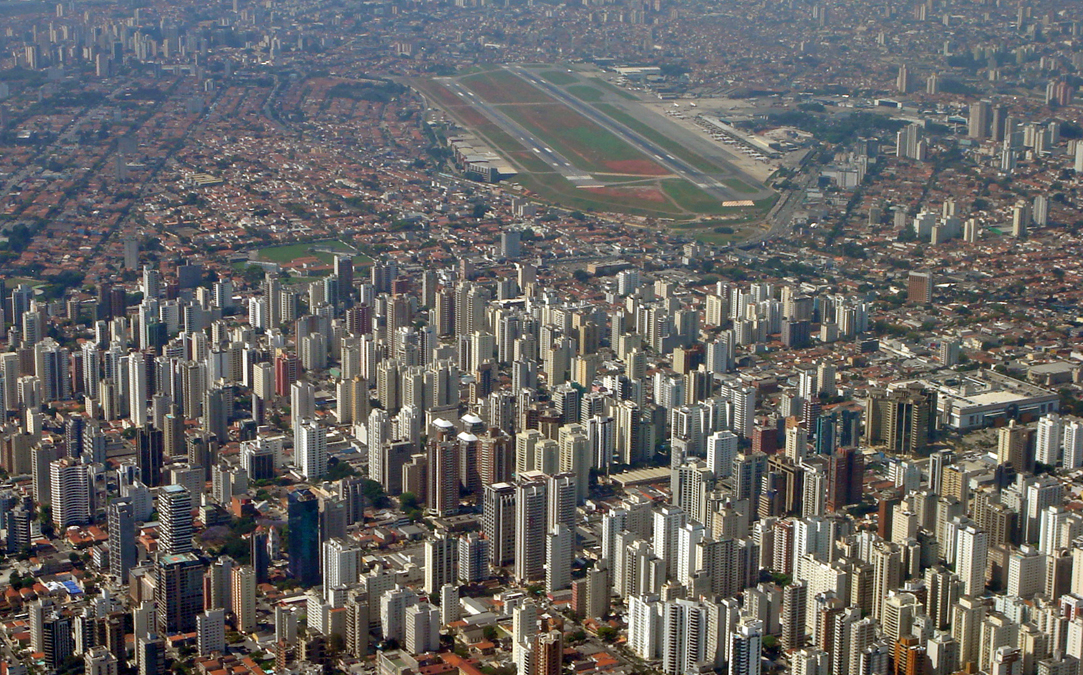
Aerial view

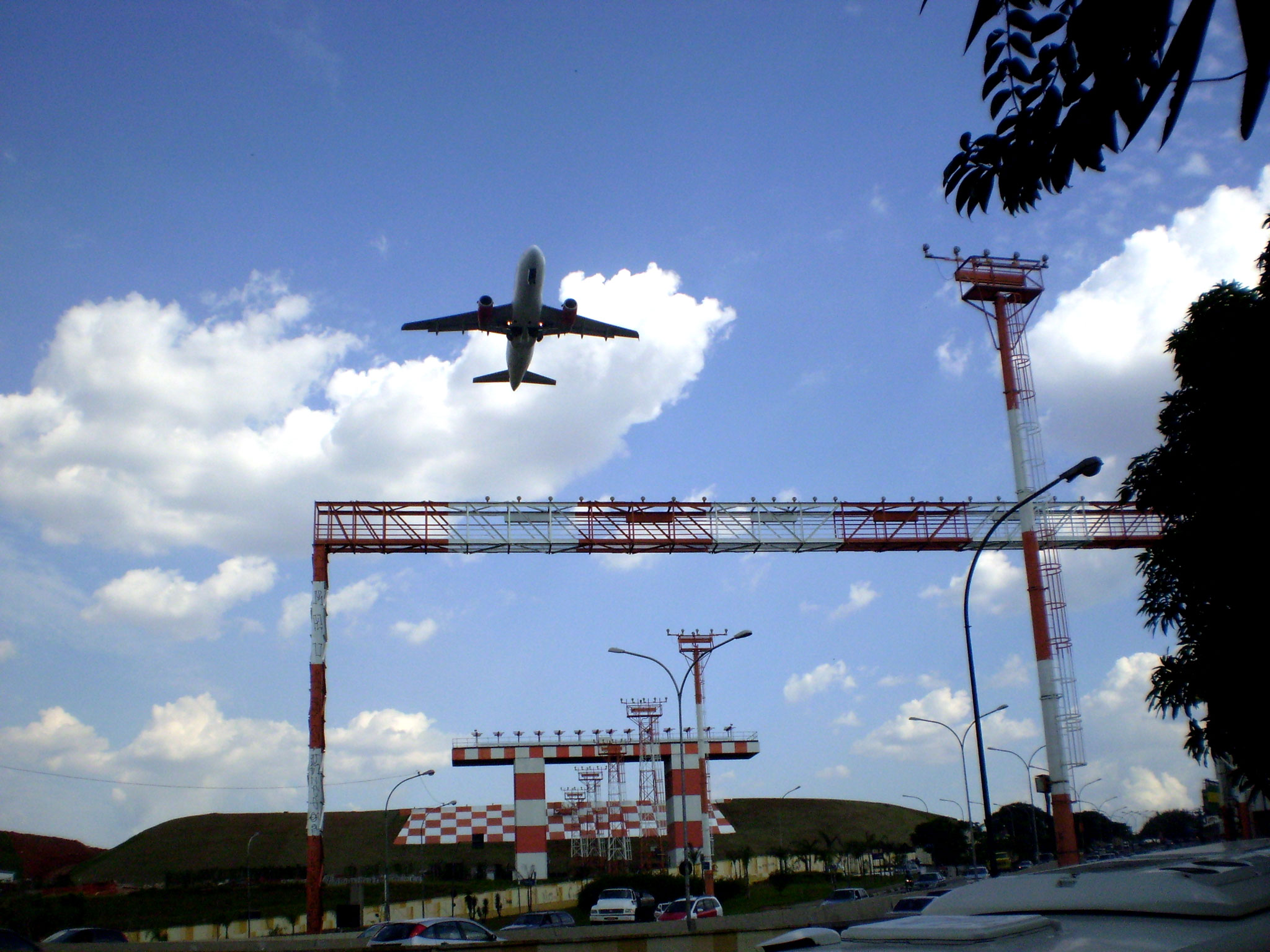
TAM Airbus A320 taking off

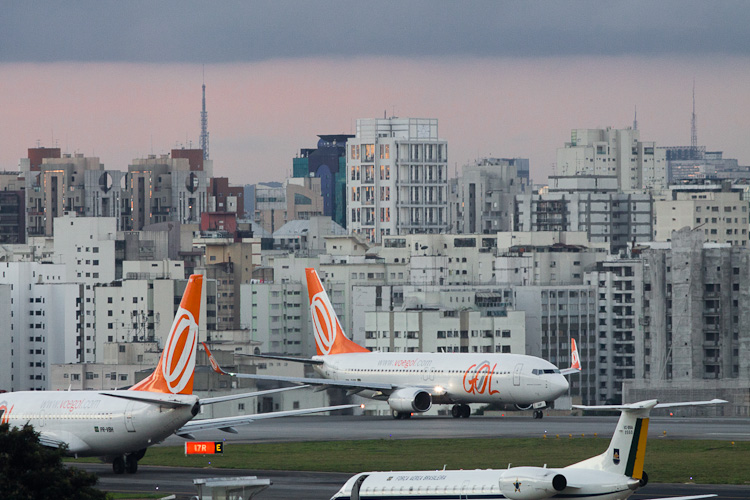
Airplanes waiting in line for take off

Following are the number of passenger, aircraft and cargo movements at the airport, according to Infraero (2007-2022) and AENA (2023-2025) reports:

Year	Passenger	Aircraft	Cargo (t)
2025	24,491,178 ▲6%	214,951 ▼8%	55,230 ▲30%
2024	23,130,523 ▲5%	234,538 ▲2%	42,574 ▲17%
2023	22,032,407 ▲22%	231,861 ▲18%	32,491 ▲2%
2022	18,075,764 ▲87%	196,137 ▲55%	31,754 ▲88%
2021	9,677,569 ▲38%	126,277 ▲30%	16,892 ▲12%
2020	6,991,460 ▼69%	97,450 ▼55%	15,123 ▼74%
2019	22,681,392 ▲3%	217,254 ▼2%	57,417 ▲11%
2018	22,125,712 ▲1%	222,298 ▲2%	51,521 ▲3%
2017	21,859,453 ▲5%	217,918 ▲2%	50,253 ▲2%
2016	20,816,957 ▲8%	213,043	49,231 ▼10%
2015	19,279,644 ▲6%	213,833 ▲4%	54,507 ▼9%
2014	18,134,768 ▲6%	205,407 ▼2%	59,588 ▼5%
2013	17,119,530 ▲2%	209,555 ▼2%	62,460 ▲4%
2012	16,775,770	213,419 ▲2%	60,345 ▲74%
2011	16,756,452 ▲8%	209,280 ▲2%	34,778 ▲49%
2010	15,499,462 ▲13%	204,943 ▲6%	23,383 ▼20%
2009	13,699,657	193,308 ▲4%	29,247 ▼10%
2008	13,672,301 ▼10%	186,694 ▼9%	32,519 ▼7%
2007	15,265,433	205,564	34,905

== Accidents and incidents ==
- 18 August 1941: a Panair do Brasil Lockheed Model 18 Lodestar registration PP-PBD en route from Curitiba-Bacacheri to São Paulo–Congonhas crashed on the Cantareira mountain range near São Paulo. 8 out of 13 passengers and crew aboard died.
- 28 September 1942: a Panair do Brasil Lockheed Model 18 Lodestar registration PP-PBG en route from Rio de Janeiro–Santos Dumont to São Paulo–Congonhas crashed on the location of Pedra Branca, near Santo André. All 15 passengers and crew died.
- 31 August 1944: a Panair do Brasil Lockheed Model 18 Lodestar registration PP-PBI crashed while on night approach to São Paulo–Congonhas under heavy fog. All 16 occupants died.
- 13 March 1948: a Cruzeiro do Sul Douglas DC-3 registration PP-CBX flying to São Paulo–Congonhas crashed on Cantareira Range, near São Paulo. All 6 passengers and crew aboard died.
- 8 September 1951: a VASP Douglas C-47 registration PP-SPQ struck a house after take-off from São Paulo–Congonhas and crashed. Thirteen passengers and crew and three persons on the ground died.
- 13 May 1952: a VASP Douglas C-47 registration PP-SPM operating a flight from São Paulo–Congonhas to Bauru lost control when carrying out an emergency landing following an engine failure. Two crew members and 3 passengers died.
- 17 June 1953: a Panair do Brasil Lockheed L-049 Constellation registration PP-PDA operating flight 263 crashed on final approach to São Paulo–Congonhas. Apparently causes are related to night operations with little visibility. All 17 passengers and crew died.
- 4 June 1954: a Varig Curtiss-Wright C-46 Commando registration PP-VBZ operating a cargo flight between São Paulo–Congonhas and Porto Alegre crashed during take-off from São Paulo. All crew of 3 died.
- 23 September 1959: a VASP Saab 90 Scandia registration PP-SQV en route from São Paulo–Congonhas to Rio de Janeiro–Santos Dumont during climb after take-off did not gain enough height and crashed 1 1/2 minutes out of São Paulo, killing all 20 passengers and crew.
- 15 January 1963: a Cruzeiro do Sul Convair CV-240 registration PP-CEV on approach to Paulo-Congonhas crashed into houses in the neighborhood of Jabaquara after an engine failed. Of the 45 passengers and crew aboard, 6 died. Six persons on the ground were also killed.
- 3 May 1963: a Cruzeiro do Sul Convair 340 registration PP-CDW flying from São Paulo–Congonhas to Rio de Janeiro–Santos Dumont had to return to São Paulo after no. 2 engine caught fire. When on finals to touch down, the aircraft nosed up 45°, stalled and struck a house. Of the 50 passengers and crew aboard, 37 died.
- 30 May 1972: a Varig Lockheed L-188 Electra registration PP-VJL operating a flight between São Paulo–Congonhas and Porto Alegre was hijacked. The hijacker demanded money. The aircraft was stormed and the hijacker was shot.
- 27 February 1975: a VASP Embraer EMB 110 Bandeirante registration PP-SBE operating flight 640 from São Paulo–Congonhas to Bauru crashed after take-off from Congonhas. The 2 crew members and 13 passengers died.
- 31 October 1996: a TAM Airlines Fokker 100 registration PT-MRK and operating flight 402 from São Paulo–Congonhas to Rio de Janeiro–Santos Dumont crashed on urban area during take-off procedures and after engine no.2 suffering an uncommanded reverse thrust and thus losing power, stalled, yawed to the right and struck a building. All 95 passengers and crew on board and 4 people on the ground died.
- 9 July 1997: a TAM Airlines Fokker 100 registration PT-WHK operating flight 283 en route from São José dos Campos to São Paulo–Congonhas was climbing after take-off from São José dos Campos when a bomb exploded in the rear part of the passenger cabin. The uncontrolled decompression blew one passenger out of the aircraft. The aircraft made a successful emergency landing in São Paulo, despite the hole in the fuselage.
- 16 July 2007: Pantanal Linhas Aéreas Flight 4763 to Juiz de Fora, an ATR 42, veered off Runway 17R after landing in light rain. The aircraft struck a light pole, a concrete box, and pavement of an adjacent taxiway, collapsing the nose landing gear. None of the 25 passengers and crew were injured, but the aircraft was written off. The accident was attributed to hydroplaning and the pilot's inappropriate rudder pedal inputs in reaction to this condition.
- 17 July 2007: a TAM Airlines Airbus A320 registration PR-MBK operating TAM Flight 3054 from Porto Alegre to São Paulo–Congonhas overran the 35L runway while landing at Congonhas, crossed a major thoroughfare and impacted against a TAM Express warehouse. All 187 passengers and crew and 12 on the ground perished. 199 bodies were recovered from the crash site, including passengers, crew and people that were working at the warehouse. It remains the deadliest aviation accident in Brazilian territory. In 2022 the airport installed EMAS Engineered materials arrestor system from RunwaySafe group to avoid future overrun accidents.

== Access ==
The airport is located 8 km (5 mi) from downtown São Paulo, at Washington Luís Avenue, in the district of Campo Belo.

Aeroporto de Congonhas monorail station is located next to the airport.

Azul Brazilian Airlines offers free bus transfers for its passengers between Congonhas and Campinas-Viracopos International Airport during regular times.

Gol Airlines and TAM Airlines offer free bus transfers for their passengers between Congonhas and Guarulhos/Gov. André Franco Montoro Airport airports during regular times.

Further bus transportation is also available through the Airport Bus Service, an executive bus line, administered by EMTU and operated by Consórcio Internorte – Área 3. This service provides transportation between Guarulhos and Congonhas airports, via Tietê Bus Terminal, Palmeiras-Barra Funda Intermodal Terminal, Itaim Bibi, Praça da República, Tatuapé Metro Station and the circuit of hotels along Avenida Paulista and Rua Augusta. The ride takes about one hour, depending on traffic.

== See also ==
- List of airports in Brazil
