= Bauru Airport =

Comandante João Ribeiro de Barros Airport Aeroporto Comandante João Ribeiro de Barros
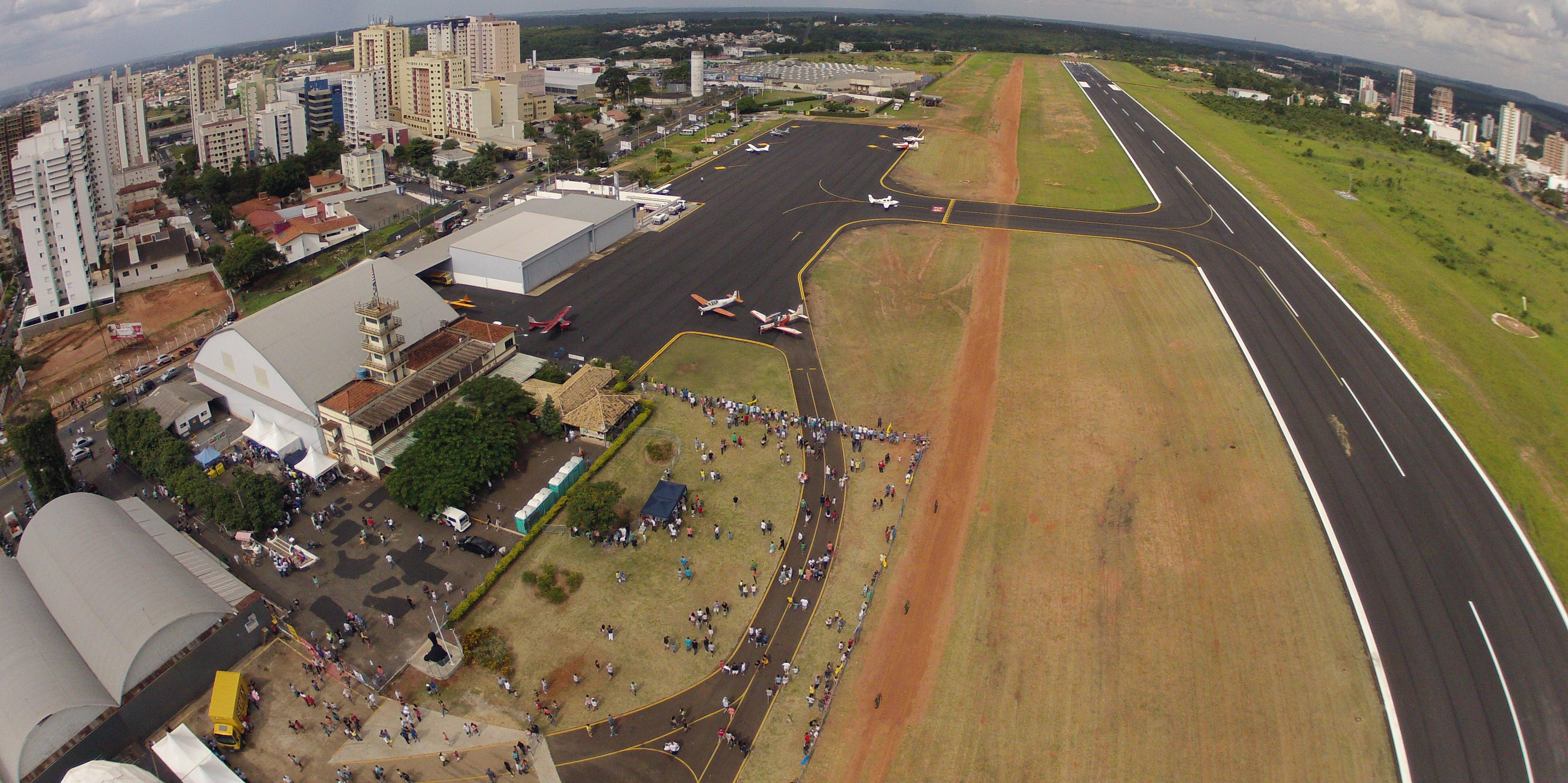
- IATA: BAU; ICAO: SBBU; LID: SP0017

Summary
- Airport type: Public
- Operator: DAESP (?–2013); Bauru (2013–present)
- Serves: Bauru
- Passenger services ceased: October 23, 2006
- Time zone: BRT (UTC−03:00)
- Elevation AMSL: 617 m (2,024 ft)
- Coordinates: 22°20′42″S 049°03′14″W

Map
- Location in Brazil BAU (Brazil)

Runways
Direction	Length		Surface
Direction	m	ft	Surface
14/32	1,501	4,925	Asphalt

Statistics (2012)
- Passengers: 11,451 ▲2%
- Aircraft Operations: 22,753 ▲2%
- Statistics: DAESP; Source: ANAC, DECEA

Comandante João Ribeiro de Barros Airport (IATA: BAU, ICAO: SBBU) is an airport serving Bauru, Brazil.

== History ==
The airport was built in 1939. On 23 October 2006 with the opening of Moussa Nakhl Tobias Airport, located in the adjoining municipality of Arealva, all scheduled traffic was transferred to the new facility. Since then Bauru Airport is dedicated to general aviation and to the operations of the Bauru Flying club.

In 2013 the administration of the airport was transferred to the Municipality of Bauru. Previously it was administrated by DAESP.

== Accidents and incidents ==
- 13 May 1952: a VASP Douglas C-47B-45-DK registration PP-SPM operating a flight from São Paulo-Congonhas to Bauru lost control when carrying out an emergency landing following an engine failure. Two crew members and 3 passengers died.
- 8 February 1979: a TAM Airlines Embraer EMB 110 Bandeirante registration PT-SBB operating a flight from Bauru to São Paulo-Congonhas, while on initial climb from Bauru, struck trees and crashed into flames. All 2 crew and 16 passengers died.
- 12 February 1990: a TAM Airlines Fokker F27 registration PT-LCG operating a flight from São Paulo-Congonhas to Bauru, due to faulty approach procedures touched down at Bauru 775m past the runway threshold. The pilot was unable to initiate a go around procedure and went past the end of the runway hitting a car that was passing on a road nearby. One crew member and 2 occupants of the car died.
- 12 October 2008: a private Beechcraft King Air registration N525ZS crashed 5 km (3.1 mi) during initial climb: after takeoff the aircraft maintained a pitch down attitude and started a small descent, coming to collide to the ground. The occupant died.

== Access ==
The airport is located 3 km (2 mi) from downtown Bauru.

== See also ==
- List of airports in Brazil
