= 1982 in aviation =

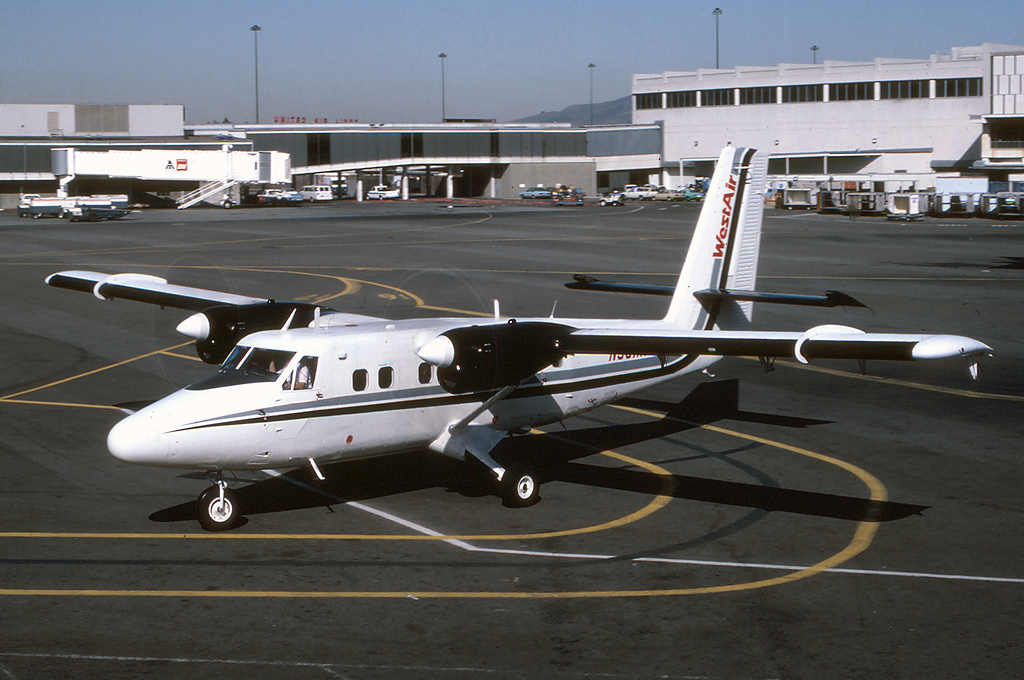
WestAir Commuter Airlines De Havilland Canada DHC-6-200 Twin Otter

This is a list of aviation-related events from 1982.

== Events ==
=== January ===
- January 8 – The Airbus A300 is certified, becoming the first wide-body airliner with cockpit accommodations for only two to be certified.
- January 10 – A Gulfstream III, Spirit of America, flies around the world in just 43 hours 39 minutes and 6 seconds, becoming the fastest business jet to fly around the world.
- January 11 – In the Iran–Iraq War, Iraqi Air Force aircraft hit the Panamanian cargo ship Success with two missiles in the Persian Gulf. Her crew abandons ship.
- January 13 – Air Florida Flight 90, a Boeing 737-222, strikes the 14th Street Bridge and crashes into the Potomac River in Washington, D.C., shortly after takeoff during a snowstorm from Washington National Airport in Crystal City, Virginia, outside Washington, D.C. Seventy-four of the 79 people on board die and all five survivors are injured; four people die and five are injured in cars on the bridge. Television cameras capture the dramatic rescue of the five survivors from the frozen river by police helicopters.
- January 14 – An Ethiopian Air Force Antonov An-26 with an unknown registration crashed near Addis Ababa, Ethiopia, killing all 73 occupants on board.
- January 18 – While practicing a line-abreast loop at Indian Springs Air Force Auxiliary Field in Nevada, four T-38 Talons of the United States Air Force Thunderbirds air demonstration team crash, killing all four pilots. It remains the worst accident involving show aircraft in Thunderbirds history. The Thunderbirds' entire 1982 season will be cancelled, and their next performance will not take place until the spring of 1983, 18 months after their last one.
- January 22 – An F/A-18 Hornet makes a fully automated landing, its autopilot linked to a ground radar at Naval Air Test Center Patuxent River, Maryland.
- January 23 – Landing on an icy runway at Boston Logan International Airport in Boston, Massachusetts, World Airways Flight 30, a McDonnell Douglas DC-10-30 carrying 212 people, is unable to stop before sliding off the end of the runway. Its pilots steer it off the runway, and it skids into Boston Harbor, where its cockpit and forward galley separate from the passenger cabin and three passengers seated in the first row are thrown into the water; two of them are never found. All others aboard survive, including actress Justine Shapiro.
- January 27 – Cessna delivers its 1,000th business jet, a Citation II.

=== February ===
- February 3 – The Mil Mi-26 helicopter lifts a load weighing 57 metric tons to 2,000 metres (6,600 feet) to break a world record for a helicopter.
- February 6 – Freddie Laker's Laker Airways flies for the last time.
- February 9 – Japan Airlines Flight 350, a Douglas DC-8, crashes into Tokyo Bay while on approach to Tokyo International Airport, killing 24 of the 174 passengers on board. The probable cause of the accident was cited as a possible breakdown by captain Seiji Katagiri, who had mental problems. After this accident, a requirement was established for every airline pilot to undergo mental as well as physical testing.
- February 25 – American Airlines announces it will cancel its orders for 15 Boeing 757s.

=== March ===
- March 11 – Widerøe Flight 933, a de Havilland Canada Twin Otter, crashes into the Barents Sea near Gamvik, Norway, killing all 15 people on board. Official investigation concludes that clear-air turbulence caused structural failure to the aircraft's tail, but others believe that an off-course Royal Air Force Harrier jet collided with the Twin Otter during a North Atlantic Treaty Organization (NATO) exercise.
- March 19 – While Ozzy Osbourne's band bus is pulled over for repairs in Leesburg, Florida, during a tour, the bus's driver – a former commercial pilot – takes band members and staff up for joyrides in a Beechcraft Bonanza F35 he had taken from an adjacent airport without permission. On the second flight, he begins to make low passes over the tour bus; on the third pass, the Bonanza's wing strikes the top of the bus, causing the plane to hit a tree and crash into the garage of a nearby mansion, where it bursts into flames, killing all three people on the plane. Guitarist Randy Rhoads is among the dead.
- March 20 – A Garuda Indonesia Fokker F-28 Fellowship overruns the runway and crashes on landing in very heavy rain at Tanjung Karang-Branti Airport at Bandar Lampung on Sumatra in Indonesia, killing all 27 people on board.
- March 22 – In the Iran–Iraq War, Iran launches its Fath al-Mubin offensive. Until it winds down a week to ten days later, Iraqi and Iranian planes and helicopters support the ground forces involved, but are generally ineffective. Iraqi Air Force fighters fly up to 150 sorties a day.

=== April ===
- Doubting the loyalty of the Islamic Republic of Iran Air Force to Iran's Islamic regime, the Ayatollah Ruhollah Khomeini again replaces its commander.
- April 1 – Air France flies the Concorde to Rio de Janeiro, Brazil. and Caracas, Venezuela for the last time.
- April 2 – The Falklands War begins as Argentina invades the Falkland Islands and South Georgia Island.
- April 5 – Royal Navy aircraft carriers HMS Hermes and HMS Invincible depart the United Kingdom for the Falkland Islands.
- April 7 – Austrian race car driver and motor sports journalist Harald Ertl is killed when a Beechcraft Bonanza piloted by his brother-in-law suffers engine failure and crashes near Giessen, West Germany. Ertl's brother-in-law and niece also die, although his wife and son survive the crash.
- April 21–25 – Helicopters play a major role as British forces recapture South Georgia Island from Argentine forces.
- April 27 – CAAC Flight 3303, a Hawker Siddeley Trident 2E, crashes into a mountain near Yangsuo, China, while on approach to Guilin Qifeng Airport in heavy rain. All 112 people on board die. The Chinese media report that the plane, which had taken off in Guangzhou, crashed when the pilot attempted to fight off an armed hijacker.
- April 29 – An Avro Vulcan bomber deploys to Ascension Island as part of the Falklands War build-up of British forces in the South Atlantic Ocean.
- April 30
  - Iran begins a major ground offensive to recapture Khorramshar from Iraq. In fighting that lasts until May 24, Iraqi aircraft fly up to 100 sorties per day, but usually attack Iranian forces in groups that are too small and arrive too late to be effective.
  - The United Kingdom declares an air blockade of the Falkland Islands.

=== May ===
- The Islamic regime in Iran blames a minor coup attempt against it on the Islamic Republic of Iran Air Force. In May and June, British BAE Sea Harriers destroy 23 Argentinian Air Force aircraft without any air-to-air combat loss to themselves.
- May 1
  - A Royal Air Force Avro Vulcan bomber based on Ascension Island attacks the airfield at Port Stanley on East Falkland Island. It is the first strike of Operation Black Buck, a series of five very-long-range missions to strike Argentinian positions in the Falkland (Malvinas) Islands. Each mission requires a 16-hour round trip of almost 8,000 nautical miles (9,200 statute miles; 15,000 km); they are the longest bombing missions in world history up to that time, and are not exceeded in distance and duration until the 1991 Gulf War.
  - BAE Sea Harriers attack Falklands targets for the first time and shoot down two Argentine Mirage III fighters. They are the first air-to-air kills of the Falklands War.
  - American Airlines launches AAdvantage, the first frequent flyer program in history. United Airlines launches its own program, Mileage Plus, only a week later.
- May 3 – Iraq shoots down an aircraft bound for Tehran, Iran, carrying Algerian Foreign Minister Mohammed Seddik Benyahia and 12 of his colleagues. The incident ends an Algerian attempt to mediate between Iran and Iraq and bring an end to the Iran–Iraq War.
- May 4
  - Argentinian Navy Super Étendard aircraft fatally damage the British destroyer Sheffield with an Exocet missile southeast of the Falkland Islands. Sheffield sinks on May 10.
  - The British lose their first Sea Harrier of the Falklands War, shot down by anti-aircraft artillery during a bombing raid over Goose Green on East Falkland Island. The pilot is killed.
- May 7 – The Air Transport Group of the Government of Australia′s Department of Transport becomes a separate government department in its own right as the Department of Aviation, serving as Australia′s national civil aviation authority.
- May 12 – Facing bankruptcy and the threat of a pilots' strike, Braniff International Airways ceases operations and its president, Howard D. Putnam, announces that the airline has filed for protection under bankruptcy laws and grounded its fleet of 71 aircraft. The final flight in Braniff's 52-year history, Flight 501 from Honolulu, operated by a Boeing 747, arrives at Dallas/Fort Worth International Airport on the morning of May 13, bringing the airline's operational history to an end.
- May 18 – American Airlines flies its one millionth passenger.
- May 20
  - Iraqi Air Force aircraft raid Kharg Island and Shiraz in Iran, but inflict little damage.
  - Frontier Airlines adds the McDonnell Douglas MD-80 to its fleet. The other jet it operates is the Boeing 737-200.
- May 21 – British ground troops begin landing at San Carlos on East Falkland Island, and the Argentinian Air Force begins a seven-day-long bombing campaign against British ships in Falkland Sound and San Carlos Water; it will be the Royal Navy's largest combat engagement since the end of World War II in August 1945. On the first day, the Argentinians sink the British frigate Ardent but lose 16 aircraft.
- May 22 – The Principe de Asturias becomes the first aircraft carrier to be launched in Spain.
- May 23 – Argentina loses seven aircraft during raids against British warships in Falkland Sound and San Carlos Water.
- May 24
  - The last service by a British Airways Boeing 707, from Cairo to London, is performed.
  - Argentinian A4B Skyhawks sink the British frigate Antelope in Falkland Sound.
  - Two Fleet Air Arm Sea Harriers of No. 800 Squadron aboard the aircraft carrier HMS Hermes attack four Argentinian Dassault Mirage 5 fighter-bombers off the Falkland Islands and use AIM-9L Sidewinder air-to-air missiles to shoot down three of them in less than five seconds.
- May 25
  - North of the Falkland Islands, Argentinian Air Force A-4 Skyhawk bombers sink the British destroyer Coventry with two 1,000-pound (450 kg) bomb hits and two Argentinian Navy Super Étendard strike aircraft sink the container ship SS Atlantic Conveyor with two Exocet anti-ship missile hits. Eleven helicopters are lost aboard Atlantic Conveyor.
  - An RAF Jaguar of 14 Squadron crashes in farmland approximately 35 miles from its base, RAF Brüggen in Germany, having been hit by an AIM-9L Sidewinder air-to-air missile accidentally fired by an RAF McDonnell Douglas Phantom.
  - VASP Flight 234, a Boeing 737-2A1 registered as PP-SMY suffered a runway excursion during landing killing 2 out of the 118 occupants on board.
- May 30 – Iraqi Air Force aircraft bomb the Iranian oil terminal at Kharg Island, seriously damaging the Turkish oil tanker Atlas.
- May 31 – Frontier Airlines retires its Convair 580s from service.

=== June ===
- June 2 – The United States Court of Appeals for the Ninth Circuit hands down its landmark aviation ruling in Ferguson v. NTSB. The court finds that an airline pilot cannot claim protection from suspension or legal penalty under the "inadvertent and not deliberate" provision of the joint Federal Aviation Administration-National Aeronautics and Space Administration Aviation Safety Reporting System, even if he or she makes an "honest mistake", if that mistake constitutes "reckless conduct" on his or her part. The ruling coins the legal phrase "inadvertent and not deliberate actions cannot encompass reckless conduct" as a precedent for evaluating the actions of airline pilots.
- June 3 – A Royal Air Force Avro Vulcan bomber returning to Ascension Island after completing Operation Black Buck 6 in the Falkland Islands runs low on fuel when a probe breaks while it attempts to refuel from a tanker aircraft over the South Atlantic Ocean. Its crew declares an emergency and flies the bomber into Brazil's airspace. Brazilian Air Force fighter aircraft of the 1° Grupo de Aviação de Caça based at Santa Cruz Air Force Base in Rio de Janeiro intercept the Vulcan and escort it to Galeão Air Force Base in Rio de Janeiro, where the bomber and its crew are interned. The Vulcan and its crew will be released on 11 June.
- June 4 – The Israeli Air Force conducts large-scale raids against Palestine Liberation Organization (PLO) targets in Lebanon, including the PLO's headquarters and military depots in Beirut.
- June 6
  - Iraqi Air Force aircraft carry out a missile attack on the Greek 26,000-gross-ton bulk carrier Good Luck in the Persian Gulf off the Iranian port of Bandar-e Emam Khomeyni, damaging her and killing some of her crewmen and beginning a pattern of sporadic Iraqi air attacks against ships calling at that port.
  - Israel begins the 1982 Lebanon War against the Palestine Liberation Organization (PLO) and Syria with Operation Peace for Galilee, an invasion of Lebanon. The Israeli Air Force supports the invasion with many attack sorties against little opposition. A PLO Strela 2 (NATO reporting name "SA-7 Grail") surface-to-air missile shoots down an Israeli A-4 Skyhawk, the only fixed-wing aircraft Israel will lose in combat during the main part of the air war, which will last until June 11.
  - The Royal Navy destroyer HMS Cardiff mistakenly shoots down a British Army Air Corps Westland Gazelle helicopter with two Sea Dart surface-to-air missiles near Pleasant Peak on East Falkland Island, killing all four occupants of the helicopter.
- June 7–8 – The Israeli Air Force encounters enemy air opposition for the first time in the 1982 Lebanon War and shoots down a Syrian Air Force MiG-23 (NATO reporting name "Flogger").
- June 8
  - VASP Flight 168, a Boeing 727-212A, crashes into a mountainside near Pacatuba, Brazil, while on approach to Fortaleza, killing all 137 people on board.
  - Argentine A4B Skyhawks destroy the British landing ship Sir Galahad and badly damage the landing ship Sir Tristram at Fitzroy on East Falkland Island, killing 51 men, 48 of them aboard Sir Galahad.
- June 8–9 – In air-to-air combat over Lebanon, Israeli aircraft shoot down six Syrian MiG-23s over Beirut, Sidon, and Damour without loss to themselves.
- June 9 – The Israeli Air Force begins a large-scale attack over the course of several hours against the 19 major Syrian surface-to-air missile batteries in Lebanon's Bekaa Valley equipped with 2K12 Kub (NATO reporting name "SA-6 Gainful") missile systems, destroying 17 of them along with several S-75 Dvina (NATO reporting name "SA-2 Guideline") and S-125 Neva/Pechora (NATO reporting name "SA-3 Goa") surface-to-air missile batteries and much Syrian antiaircraft artillery in only 10 to 20 minutes of active combat. Around 50 Syrian fighter aircraft attempt to defend the missile sites, and about 100 Israeli aircraft engage them, shooting down 22 or 23 Syrian fighters and damaging seven others without any Israeli losses. In ground fighting, a significant number of Syrian attack helicopters and some Syrian fixed-wing aircraft attack Israeli ground forces in Lebanon.
- June 10 – The Israeli Air Force shoots down 25 Syrian fixed-wing aircraft and three helicopters during the day and destroys two more Syrian surface-to-air missile batteries deployed to the Bekaa Valley as reinforcements. By the end of the day, Israeli Air Force aircraft have shot down 65 Syrian MiG-21 (NATO reporting name "Fishbed") and MiG-23 aircraft in air-to-air combat, without any Israeli losses.
- June 11
  - Israeli Air Force aircraft shoot down 18 more Syrian fighters and attack aircraft, bringing the Syrian air-to-air losses to 79 to 82 aircraft in air-to-air combat without any Israeli aircraft being shot down by Syrian aircraft. Syria claims to have shot down 19 Israeli aircraft during the day despite its complete lack of success.
  - A British Westland Wessex helicopter fires two AS.12 air-to-surface missiles at the town hall in Stanley in the Falkland Islands in an attempt to kill or incapacitate Argentina's Military Governor of the Falkland Islands, South Georgia, and the South Sandwich Islands, Argentine Army Brigadier General Mario Benjamín Menéndez, during what the British believe to be his daily conference there. The strike fails when one missile malfunctions and the other misses the town hall and strikes the police station. No one is injured.
- June 12 – Operation Black Buck concludes with the last of five very-long range strikes on the Falkland Islands by Royal Air Force Avro Vulcan bombers.
- June 14 – Argentinian forces on the Falkland Islands surrender to British forces, ending the Falklands War. During the war, the Argentines had lost 100 aircraft and 34 aircraft were lost by the British. Figures include direct combat losses, aircraft captured and aircraft lost aboard ships that were damaged or sunk and accidents.
- June 20 – The Israel Defense Forces take control of Beirut International Airport in Lebanon.
- June 21 – The Air India Boeing 707-437 Gouri Shankar, operating as Air India Flight 403, crashes while landing in a rainstorm at Sahar International Airport in Bombay, India, killing 17 of the 111 people on board.
- June 24 – The Boeing 747-236B City of Edinburgh, operating as British Airways Flight 9 with 263 people on board, flies through a cloud of volcanic ash south of Java. All of its engines shut down, but the crew is able to restart them and make a safe landing at Halim Perdanakusuma Airport in Djakarta, Indonesia.
- June 30
  - The Royal Australian Navy decommissions its last aircraft carrier, HMAS Melbourne (R21).
  - A Sri Lankan man hijacks an Alitalia Boeing 747-243B with 260 people on board flying from Delhi, India, to Bangkok, Thailand, claiming to have six accomplices on board and saying he will blow up the plane if he does not receive a US$300,000 ransom and is not reunited with his wife and child, who are in Italy. At Bangkok, he releases four passengers, then he releases another 139 when he is told that his wife and child are on their way to Bangkok; two additional passengers escape by jumping from the plane. After his wife and child board the plane and he receives the ransom, authorities allow the family to fly to Colombo, Sri Lanka, early on July 1. Sri Lankan authorities arrest the man on July 3.

=== July ===
- July 2 – In the Lawnchair Larry flight, the homemade Inspiration I, consisting of a patio chair attached to 45 eight-foot (2.4-m) helium-filled weather balloons, lifts off from the back yard of a home in San Pedro, California, carrying American truck driver Larry Walters, whose plan is to drift at an altitude of about 30 feet (9.1 m) for a few hours before using a pellet gun to shoot out some balloons and descend gradually. Instead, Inspiration I quickly ascends to an altitude of 16,000 feet (4,900 m). After drifting into controlled airspace near Long Beach Airport, he uses the pellet gun to shoot out several of his balloons before accidentally dropping the pellet gun overboard. He gradually descends, becomes entangled in power lines, climbs down safely, and is arrested.
- July 3 – In Lebanon, the Israel Defense Forces begin the organized Siege of Beirut. The Israeli Air Force begins harassing raids against Palestine Liberation Organization (PLO) forces and facilities in Beirut in support of the siege.
- July 6 – After the engine fire warning lights illuminate for two of their Ilyushin Il-62's four engines shortly after takeoff from Moscow's Sheremetyevo International Airport, the pilots of Aeroflot Flight 411 shut down the engines and attempt to return to the airport on their two remaining engines. The plane crashes in a field in Mendeleyevo, killing all 90 people on board. The engine fire warnings are later reported to have been false alarms.
- July 9 – The Pan American World Airways Boeing 727-235 Clipper Defiance, operating as Flight 759, crashes in Kenner, Louisiana, immediately after takeoff from New Orleans International Airport, destroying six and severely damaging five houses. All 145 people on the plane and eight people on the ground die; a baby girl in one house survives in her crib, protected by debris from the fire started by the crash.
- July 13 – United States Navy Reserve Lieutenant Commander Barbara Allen Rainey dies in the crash of a T-34C Mentor trainer aircraft at Middleton Field near Evergreen, Conecuh County, Alabama, during a training flight. In February 1974, as Barbara Ann Allen, she had become the first female aviator in the United States Armed Forces.
- July 18 – The Soviet Union claims that Syria has shot down 67 Israeli fighters during the 1982 Lebanon War. Actual Israeli Air Force fixed-wing aircraft losses to date total one, an A-4 Skyhawk shot down by a PLO missile.
- July 21
  - Islamic Republic of Iran Air Force aircraft bomb Baghdad, Iraq.
  - In response to PLO attacks on Israeli positions, Israeli begins a series of major air and artillery attacks on West Beirut.
- July 23 – During predawn filming of Twilight Zone: The Movie at Valencia, California, special-effects explosions damage the tail rotor of a Bell UH-1B Iroquois helicopter hovering 24 feet (7.3 meters) above actor Vic Morrow and child actors Myca Dinh Le and Renee Shin-Yi Chen. The helicopter crashes onto them, its main rotor decapitating Morrow and Dinh and one of its struts crushing Chen to death.
- July 23–26 – The Israeli Air Force conducts major air raids against PLO targets in West Beirut.
- July 24 – The Israeli Air Force destroys all three Syrian 9K33 Osa (NATO reporting name "Gecko") surface-to-air missile batteries in Lebanon's Bekaa Valley, only a day after Syria had deployed them there. During the operation, Israel loses one F-4 Phantom II shot down by a Syrian surface-to-air missile, the second and last Israeli fixed-wing aircraft lost in action during the 1982 Lebanon War.
- July 24–25 – A sabotage raid takes place at Gweru-Thornhill Air Base in Zimbabwe. One BAe Hawk, seven Hawker Hunters and one Cessna Skymaster was destroyed, with a further three Hawks and one Hunter badly damaged. Six officers of the Air Force of Zimbabwe are charged with assisting the attack, but are eventually cleared of all charges in court, and deported.
- July 27 – The Israeli Air Force escalates its air campaign against the PLO in Beirut by beginning attacks on PLO-dominated residential areas in West Beirut.
- July 28 – American contemporary Christian music pianist, singer, songwriter, and evangelist Keith Green is among 12 people killed in the crash of an overloaded Cessna 414 at Lindale, Texas. Green's two children and all eight members of another family are also among the dead.
- July 28-August 3 – The Israeli Air Force conducts constant attacks on West Beirut.
- July 29 – Mexican airline Mexicana de Aviación is nationalized.
- July 31 – In air-to-air combat since the 1982 Lebanon War began on June 6, Israeli F-15 Eagle fighters have shot down 40 Syrian aircraft, F-16 Fighting Falcons have shot down 44, and F-4 Phantom IIs have shot down one, all without loss to themselves. About half the kills have been MiG-21s and the other half MiG-23s.

=== August ===
- After a vote in the Israeli Knesset banning Israel's national airline, El Al, from flying on the Jewish Sabbath outrages secular Israelis, angry El Al employees block Orthodox and Hassidic Jews from entering the airport building at Ben Gurion Airport in Tel Aviv.
- August 7 – Two members of the "Pierre Gulumian Commando" group of the Armenian Secret Army for the Liberation of Armenia (ASALA) attack Esenboğa International Airport in Ankara, Turkey, detonating a bomb and then opening fire with submachine guns. Before police kill one of the attackers and wound and arrest the other after a two-hour shootout, nine people are killed and 72 injured.
- August 9
  - Iraqi Air Force aircraft make a missile attack in the Persian Gulf off the Iranian port of Bandar-e Emam Khomeyni, sinking the 15,000-gross-ton Greek cargo ship Lition Bride and damaging the South Korean bulk carrier Sanbow Banner beyond repair. Sanbow Banner suffers eight crewmen missing and one killed.
  - Israeli Air Force strikes against Palestine Liberation Organization (PLO) targets in West Beirut, Lebanon, continue despite a PLO agreement with intermediaries three days earlier to evacuate Beirut.
- August 10 – The Israeli Air Force strikes Syrian 9K33 Osa (NATO reporting name "SA-8 Gecko") and 9K31 Strela-1 (NATO reporting name "SA-9 Gaskin") surface-to-air missile batteries in Lebanon's Bekaa Valley, easily destroying them.
- August 10–11 – The Israeli Air Force launches major attacks against PLO targets in West Beirut in response to what Israeli Minister of Defense Ariel Sharon claims was a PLO artillery attack on Israeli soldiers besieging Beirut. The Israeli Cabinet disagrees and orders that no further Israeli Air Force attacks on Beirut take place without its authorization.
- August 11 – A terrorist bomb explodes under a seat cushion on board the Pan American World Airways Boeing 747-121 Clipper Ocean Rover, operating as Flight 830 from Narita International Airport in Tokyo, Japan, to Honolulu International Airport in Hawaii, with 274 people on board. It kills a 16-year-old Japanese boy and injures 15 other people. The plane makes an emergency landing in Honolulu.
- August 18 – Iraqi Air Force aircraft raid the Iranian oil terminal at Kharg Island.
- August 25 – Iraqi aircraft again strike Kharg Island.
- August 26 – Southwest Air Lines Flight 611, a Boeing 737-200 operated by what later becomes Japan Transocean Air, overruns the runway while landing at Ishigaki Airport in Japan. There are no fatalities, but 67 of the 138 on board are injured and the aircraft is destroyed by fire.
- August 30 – An Israeli MIM-23 Hawk surface-to-air missile shoots down a Syrian MiG-25 (NATO reporting name "Foxbat") aircraft flying above 70,000 feet (21,000 meters) at a speed of Mach 2.5.
- August 31 – The Israeli Air Force shoots down a Syrian MiG-25, raising the total number of Syrian aircraft lost in the 1982 Lebanon War to 88.

=== September ===
- Fighting in the 1982 Lebanon War comes to an end by mid-month. Israeli Air Force F-15 Eagle and F-16 Fighting Falcon aircraft have shot down 82 Syrian Air Force aircraft – mainly MiG-21s and MiG-23s – without loss in air-to-air combat. Total losses for Israel come to one A-4 Skyhawk and one F-4 Phantom II (both shot down by surface-to-air missiles) and three helicopters, while Syria has lost 92 fighters and attack aircraft.
- September 1–30 – H. Ross Perot, Jr., and Jay W. Coburn fly their Bell LongRanger II helicopter Spirit of Texas around the world in 29 days, 3 hours, and 8 minutes, leaving from and returning to Dallas, Texas. It is the first time a trip around the world by helicopter is completed.
- September 4 – Iraqi Air Force aircraft make a missile attack on a convoy of 10 merchant ships escorted by Islamic Republic of Iran vessels in the Persian Gulf off the Iranian port of Bandar-e Emam Khomeyni, scoring a direct hit on the engine room of Turkish bulk carrier Mars Transporter, damaging her beyond repair.
- September 8–9 – The Israeli Air Force strikes Syrian 9K33 Osa (NATO reporting name "SA-8 Gecko") and 9K31 Strela-1 (NATO reporting name "SA-9 Gaskin") surface-to-air missile batteries in Lebanon's Bekaa Valley, easily destroying them.
- September 11 – A United States Army CH-47 Chinook helicopter (serial number 74-22292) crashes during an air show at Mannheim, West Germany, while carrying British, French, and German parachutists who planned to jump when the helicopter reached an altitude of 12,000 feet (3,700 meters). All 46 people aboard die. The crash later is found to have been caused by an accumulation of ground walnut shells that had been used to clean the machinery.
- September 13
  - The Israeli Air Force again easily destroys Syrian 9K33 Osa (Sa-8 Gecko) and 9K31 Strela-1 (SA-9 Gaskin) surface-to-air missile batteries in the Bekaa Valley.
  - The flight crew of Spantax Flight 995, a chartered McDonnell Douglas DC-10-30 with 394 people on board, aborts their takeoff at Málaga, Spain, after feeling a vibration and loses control of the aircraft, which rolls off the end of the runway, strikes vehicles while crossing a four-lane highway, and bursts into flames in a field. Fifty people on board die, as do three people in vehicles on the highway; 110 people on board the plane are injured.
- September 14 – G-BDIL a Bell 212, crashed into the North Sea near the Murchison oil platform while on a nighttime search and rescue mission.
- September 17 – Iraqi Air Force aircraft raid the Iranian oil terminal at Kharg Island.
- September 18 – The first BAC One-Eleven assembled in Romania, a Series 560, flies for the first time.
- September 22 – Armed with a knife, 37-year-old Igor Shkuro, who had been denied a visa to enter Algeria and was being returned to Italy, forces his way into the cockpit of Alitalia Flight 871 – a Boeing 727-243 with 109 people on board flying from Algiers to Rome – and hijacks the plane about 20 minutes after departure from Algiers. Holding the knife to the flight engineer′s throat, he demands to be flown to Malta, but after authorities deny the airliner permission to land there, he agrees to allow it to land at Catania, Sicily. After about 30 minutes, he allows the passengers and five of the eight crew members to disembark. Later, the remaining crew members attack him and overpower him with the help of the police.
- September 28 – The thrust reverser on the No. 1 engine of Aeroflot Flight 343, an Ilyushin Il-62M (registration CCCP-86470) with 77 people on board, fails to deploy as it lands at Luxembourg Findel Airport outside Luxembourg City, Luxembourg. The airliner yaws to the right and runs off the runway 1,300 meters (4,300 feet) past the runway threshold, strikes a 1.3-meter-tall (4-foot-tall) building, and slides down a ravine before coming to rest 2,200 meters (7,200 feet) past the runway threshold and 200 meters (660 feet) to the right of the runway's centerline and catching fire. The crash kills seven people aboard the airliner, which is destroyed.

=== October ===
- McDonnell Douglas delivers the final DC-9.
- October 17 – EgyptAir Flight 771, a Boeing 707-366C (registration SU-APE), strikes the ground 50 meters (160 feet) short of the runway while attempting to land at Cointrin Airport in Geneva, Switzerland, bounces, skids off the runway, rotates 270 degrees, and slides to a stop backwards after its right wing detaches. All 182 people on board survive.
- October 28 – Air France flies its last Boeing 707 service, a flight from Tunis to Paris.
- October 31 – Texas International Airlines merges with Continental Airlines, the combined airline retaining the identity of Continental.

=== November ===
- A Boeing 757 sets a nonstop distance record for the type, flying 7,907 km (4,913 mi) from Tokyo to Seattle. The record will stand until July 1986.
- November 4
  - Pan American World Airways inaugurates service from Los Angeles to Sydney; at 7,487 miles (12,049 km), it is the longest non-stop flight in the world.
  - American Airlines receives its first Boeing 767, N301AA.
- November 21 – Iraqi Air Force aircraft damage the Indian bulk carrier Archana in a missile attack in the Persian Gulf off the Iranian port of Bushehr, slightly damaging her.
- November 23 – American minister, humorist, television personality, and author Grady Nutt is killed along with the other two people on board a chartered Beechcraft Baron 55 when it crashes on takeoff in rain and fog at Vinemont, Alabama.

=== December ===
- December 3 – Trans World Airlines begins Boeing 767 service with a flight from Los Angeles to Washington Dulles International Airport outside Washington, D.C.
- December 7 – The Government of Pakistan establishes the Pakistan Civil Aviation Authority to serve as Pakistan′s national civil aviation authority.
- December 9 – Aeronor Flight 304, a Fairchild F-27, suffers an engine failure and crashes near La Florida Airport in La Serena, Chile, killing all 46 people on board.
- December 18 – Iraqi Air Force aircraft make a missile attack on the Greek oil tanker Scapmount in the channel at the Iranian port of Bandar-e Emam Khomeyni, setting her on fire and forcing her crew to abandon ship.
- December 21 – Operating from the Air Force Flight Test Center at Edwards Air Force Base in California, an F-15A Eagle performs the first captive-carry test flight of an ASM-135 anti-satellite missile.

== First flights ==
=== February ===
- February 6 – Grob G 110
- February 19 – Boeing 757 N757BA

=== March ===
- March 8 – Quickie Free Enterprise
- March 22 – Valmet PIK-23 Towmaster

=== April ===
- April 3 - Airbus A310

=== June ===
- June 12 - IAR-825 YR-IGB
- June 14 - Beechcraft Lightning
- June 18 – PZL-Mielec M-21 Dromader Mini

=== July ===
- July 14 - Harbin Y-12
- July 19 - Co Z Development Cozy
- July 20 - AISA GN
- July 29 - Smith XP-99 Prop-Jet

=== August ===
- August 19 - Hawk GafHawk 125
- August 23 - Seawind International Seawind
- August 30 - Northrop F-20 Tigershark 82-0062

=== September ===
- Beechcraft Commuter Model 1900
- September 10 - Mudry CAP X
- September 25 – Ilyushin Il-102

=== October ===
- October 5 - Boeing 747-300.
- October 11 - HAL Ajeet Mk2 Trainer E2426

=== November ===
- November 10 - Mil Mi-28

=== December ===
- December 9 - Cessna 208 Caravan N208LP
- December 23 - Short C-23 Sherpa G-BKMW
- December 26 - Antonov An-124 Ruslan ("Condor")

== Entered service ==
- Mikoyan MiG-31 'Foxhound' with Soviet Air Force/V-PVO

=== January ===
- January 6 – Westland 30 with British Airways Helicopters

=== July ===
- Dornier 228 with Norving

=== December ===
- Boeing 767 with United Air Lines

== Deadliest crash ==
The deadliest crash of this year was Pan Am Flight 759, a Boeing 727 which crashed just after takeoff in New Orleans, Louisiana, U.S. on 9 July, killing all 145 people on board, as well as 8 on the ground.
