= VASP Flight 141 =

1964 aviation accident in Brazil

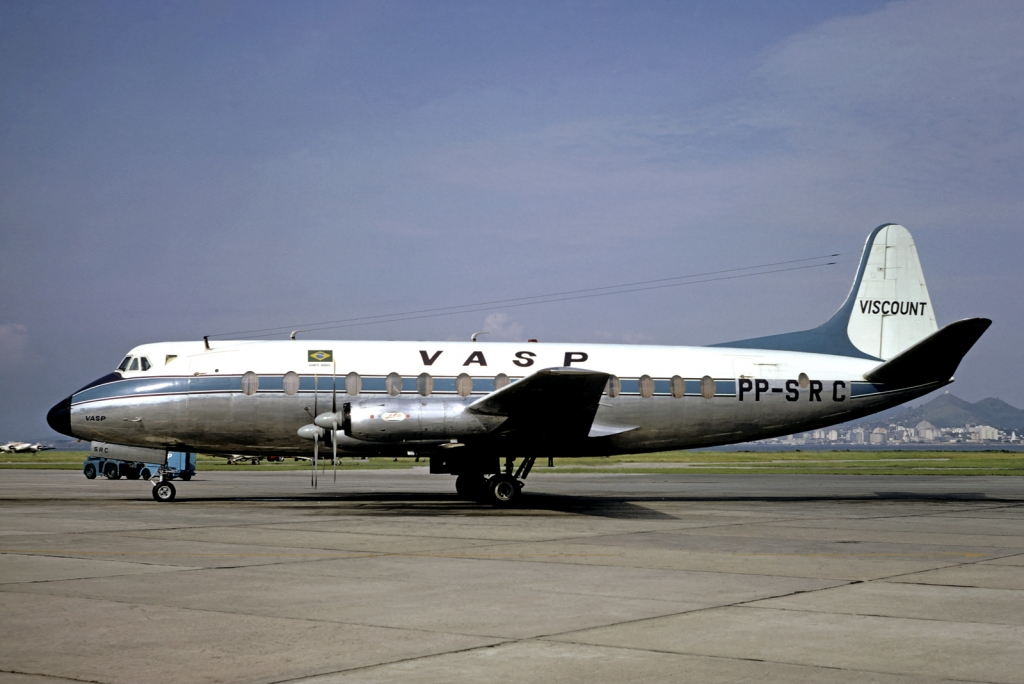
- A Viscount of VASP, similar to the one involved

Accident
- Date: September 4, 1964
- Summary: Controlled flight into terrain
- Site: Pico da Caledônia, Brazil

Aircraft
- Aircraft type: Vickers Viscount
- Operator: Viação Aérea São Paulo (VASP)
- IATA flight No.: VP141
- ICAO flight No.: VSP141
- Call sign: VASP 141
- Registration: PP-SRR
- Flight origin: Recife, Brazil
- Stopover: Goiabeiras Airport, Brazil
- Last stopover: Rio de Janeiro, (Unknown Airport) Brazil
- Destination: Sao Pãulo, Brazil
- Occupants: 39
- Passengers: 34
- Crew: 5
- Fatalities: 39
- Survivors: 0

On 4 September 1964, VASP Flight 141, a Vickers 701C Viscount, was operating a domestic passenger service between Recife, Brazil, to São Paulo, Brazil, with two stopovers. During the second flight of the day, the aircraft impacted mountainous terrain, killing all 39 occupants on board.

== Background ==
=== Aircraft ===
The aircraft involved was a Vickers Viscount 701C, registered as PP-SRR with serial number 66. It had logged a total of 17165 airframe hours and was manufactured in 1955. This accident was the 49th hull-loss accident of the same aircraft at the time, the 32nd fatal accident of this type, the 16th worst accident of the type and the 6th at the time.

=== Passengers and crew ===
There were 34 passengers and 5 crew members. Of the 34 passengers, 18 originated from Vitoria and 6 from Recife. The pilot in command had logged a total of 6,787 total flight hours, with 428 flight hours on the Vickers Viscount, while the copilot had logged 5,945 flight hours, with 433 on the Vickers Viscount.

== Flight ==
The aircraft took off from the Vitória-Goiabeiras Airport at 6:45 p.m., GMT, and immediately climbed to 1,800 metres (5,900 feet). The last contact of the plane was when the crew asked Rio de Janeiro airport control for emergency landing preparations. At 7:33 p.m., the aircraft reported over Rio Bonito when the aircraft was actually over Nova Friburgo, 43 kilometres (27 miles) from Rio Bonito. One minute later, the aircraft crashed into the west slope of the Pico da Caledônia mountain at an altitude of 1,950 m (6,400 ft). Eyewitnesses saw the plane bursting and on flames. The probable cause determined by the Aeronautical Accidents Investigation and Prevention Center (CENIPA) was unknown.

== Aftermath and legacy ==
The accident was found by a Brazilian Air Force search plane. After the discovery, a large rescue operation was initiated. Villagers were told to donate blood if any survivors were found. Helicopters stood by parachute rescuers to find survivors. Approximately nine ambulances were sent to the location. Rains swept the mountains with heavy fog. Only a few trails lead up the mountain. The local air ministry said that the accident was "erroneous and ruinous".

== See also ==
- VASP Flight 234
- VASP Flight 168
