= VASP Cargo Flight 780 =

1992 aviation accident in Brazil

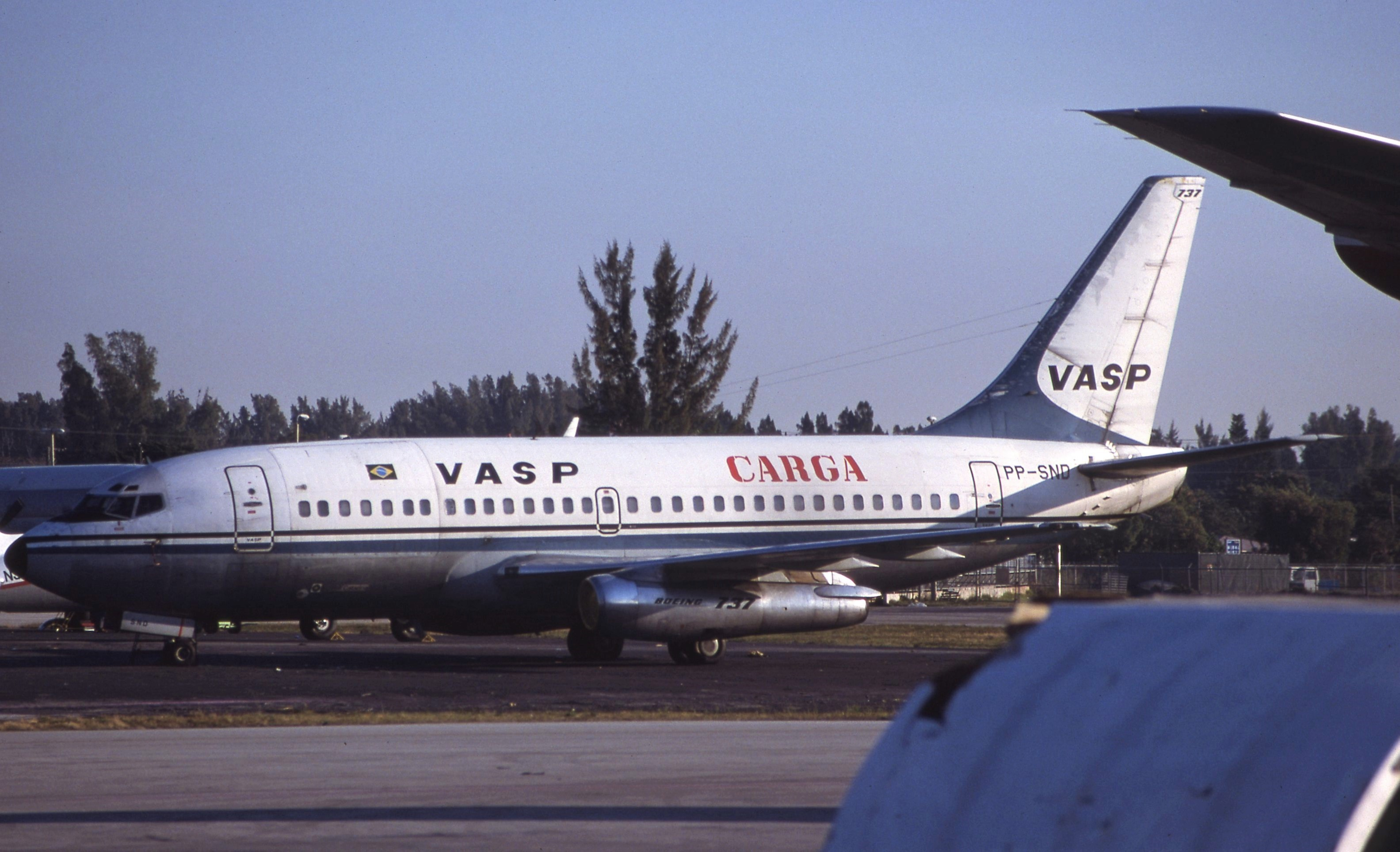
- PP-SND, the aircraft involved, pictured in 1987

Accident
- Date: 22 June 1992
- Summary: Controlled flight into terrain due to pilots' loss of situation awareness from fire alarm
- Site: near Cruzeiro do Sul International Airport, Cruzeiro do Sul, Acre, Brazil

Aircraft
- Aircraft type: Boeing 737-2A1C
- Operator: VASP
- IATA flight No.: VP780
- ICAO flight No.: VSP780
- Call sign: VASP 780
- Registration: PP-SND
- Flight origin: Presidente Médici International Airport, Rio Branco, Acre, Brazil
- Destination: Cruzeiro do Sul International Airport, Cruzeiro do Sul, Acre, Brazil
- Occupants: 3
- Passengers: 1
- Crew: 2
- Fatalities: 3
- Survivors: 0

VASP Cargo Flight 780 was a scheduled cargo flight from Rio Branco, Brazil to Cruzeiro do Sul, Acre, Brazil. On 22 June 1992, the aircraft operating the flight impacted terrain on approach to Cruzeiro do Sul Airport, killing all three occupants onboard. The investigation found that the crew had lost situational awareness after they were distracted by the sound of a fire warning bell in the cockpit, which indicated a fire somewhere on the aircraft, resulting in neither crew member checking the plane's altitude until it impacted terrain.

== Victims ==
On this flight, the aircraft had three crew members:

- Captain Dárcio Lino de Matos, 29 years old – having 4,581 flight hours, including 3,081 hours of this type
- Co-pilot Ricardo Desidério Lopes, 31 years old – having 2,437 flight hours, including 337 hours of this type
- Flight engineer Mauro da Silva Borges, 25 years old – at VASP since 1988, abroad as a passenger

== Accident ==
The cargo onboard included two brand-new motorcycles, two air conditioning units, dairy products, fruits and vegetables, mail, documents, cigarettes, shoes, margarine and cosmetics.

At approximately 00:40, the aircraft requested clearance to leave flight level 310 (31,000 feet, 9,450 meters), which was granted. Upon initiating the Delta 1 procedure to land on runway 10 at Cruzeiro do Sul, the cargo compartment smoke alarm began to sound at intervals of approximately three repetitions per minute. Captain Dárcio asked flight engineer Mauro to check and activate the fire extinguisher if necessary, and when Mauro returned stating that he had found no abnormalities, Dárcio asked him to close the cockpit door and sit down to check on the ground.

The commander attempted to contact the control towers in Rio Branco and Cruzeiro do Sul. Only Cruzeiro do Sul responded and he requested the deployment of firefighters on the Cruzeiro do Sul runway when speaking to the tower, but without declaring an emergency. The landing continued. However, at 01:05, 15 kilometers from the runway, the aircraft collided with the treetops and crashed into the ground at a speed of 255 km/h (138 knots). The impact caused an explosion and the cargo was thrown at the crew on impact, mutilating their bodies. The aircraft wreckage left a 300-meter trail through the forest.

=== Discovery ===
The aircraft wreckage was found at 4:50 am by another aircraft contracted by the company. The rescue team included riverside residents, the army, the Fire Department and Infraero. It was coordinated by Luiz Antônio Cruz, then vice-president of operations at VASP. They were forced to clear paths to reach the site, which was accessible by boat or helicopter, and faced considerable difficulty. The bodies of the crew were found at 4:30 pm by the Cruzeiro do Sul Military Group. The then superintendent of Infraero, João Negreiros, stated that "the plane burned completely, only the wreckage remained" after flying over the site.

Some of the wreckage still remains on site, weathered by time, however most of it has been carried away by the floods and ebb tides of the Moa River, or taken by people as a memento of the accident.

== Investigation ==
The Aeronautical Accidents Investigation and Prevention Center (CENIPA) of Brazil started an investigation into the cause of the accident. According to the final investigation report, the pilots became distracted by the fire warning. Believing that there was a serious onboard emergency, they focused primarily on carrying out the emergency procedures and finding the nearest airport for an immediate landing. The crew rushed the approach and failed to made "callouts", causing them to loss situational awareness of their altitude and descended below the glide path.

== See also ==
- VASP Flight 168
- VASP Flight 141
- TEAM Linhas Aéreas Flight 6865
