= Ecuatoriana de Aviación =

National airline of Ecuador (1957–2006)

Ecuatoriana de Aviacion
IATA	ICAO	Call sign
EU	EEA	ECUATORIANA
- Founded: May 1957 (as Compañía Ecuatoriana de Aviación)
- Commenced operations: August 1957
- Ceased operations: 2006
- Hubs: Mariscal Sucre International Airport
- Focus cities: Simón Bolívar International Airport
- Frequent-flyer program: Lider Club
- Parent company: VASP (50.1%)
- Headquarters: Quito, Ecuador

Empresa Ecuatoriana de Aviación, more commonly known as simply Ecuatoriana, was the national airline of Ecuador. The carrier had an operational hiatus between September 1993 and August 1995, resuming operations on 23 June 1996, after VASP became the controlling shareholder. The airline folded permanently in 2006.

== History ==
=== Compañía Ecuatoriana de Aviación ===
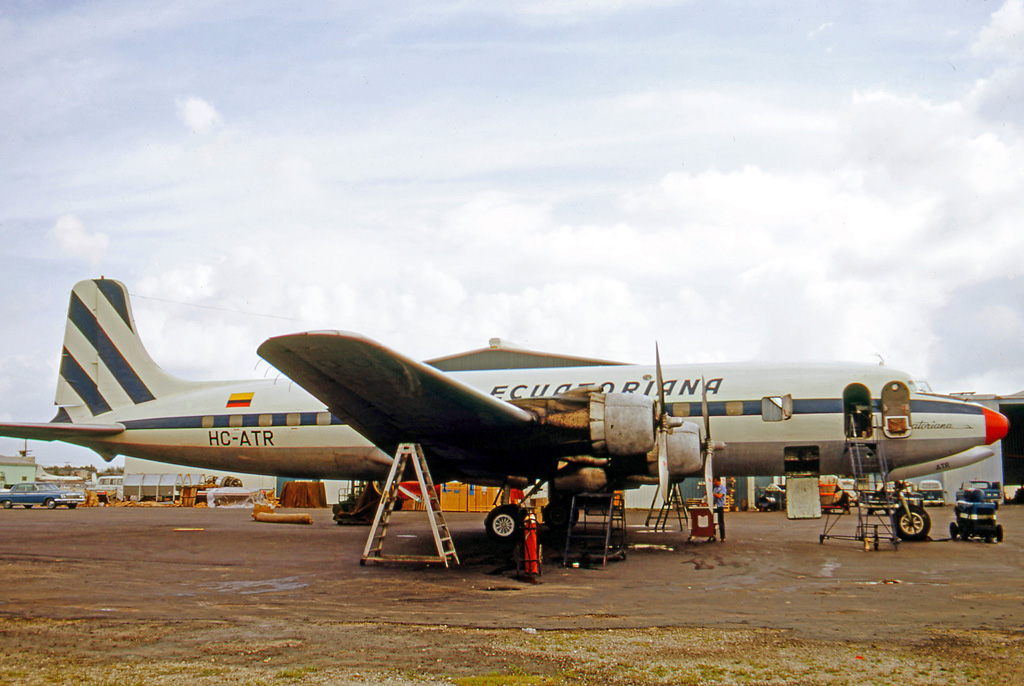
Douglas DC-6A freighter of Ecuatoriana at Miami in 1970

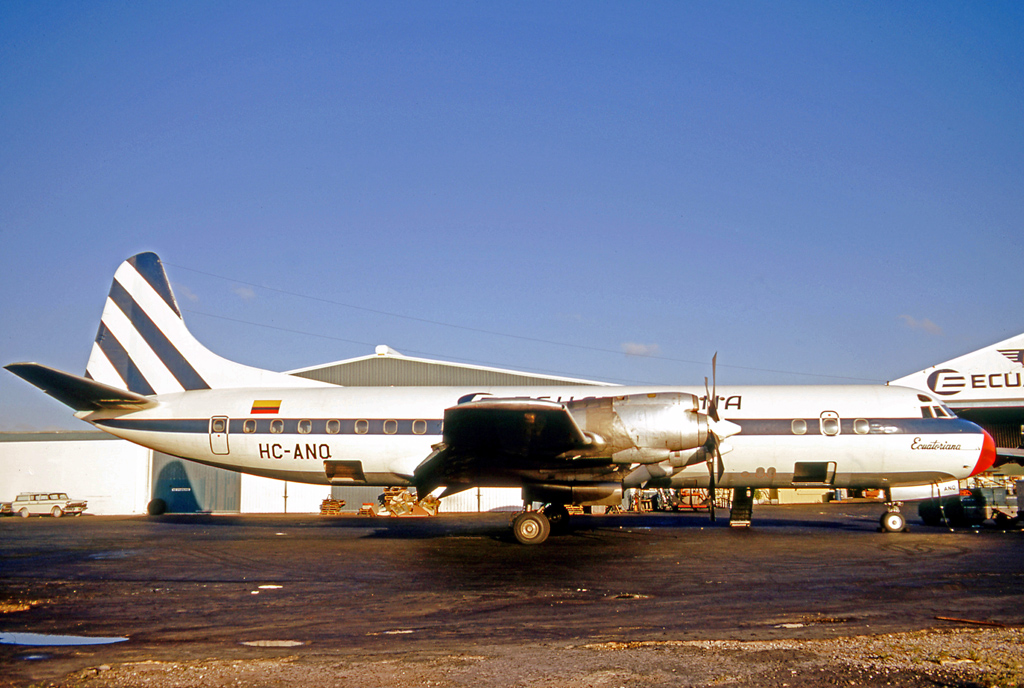
Ecuatoriana Lockheed Electra at Miami International Airport in 1971

Compañia Ecuatoriana de Aviación (CEA) (English: Ecuadorian Aviation Company) was established in May 1957, after a group of American and Ecuadorian investors decided to set up an airline. At first, 50 percent of the airline was owned by Americans. Operations started in August 1957. Serving a relatively small country, the airline had a varied fleet that consisted of Curtiss C-46, Douglas DC-4, Douglas DC-6 and one Junkers K 16 aircraft. The Junkers airplane was a rarity, as Junkers airliners were already considered to be classics at the time.

Ecuatoriana began serving both domestic and international destinations immediately after it started flying. International routes proved to be rather long trips: there were jets already in operation when Ecuatoriana began flying (before the Boeing 707 made its first flight), but they were predominantly used by European airlines. Ecuatoriana's equipment necessitated a stopover in Panama City for its first international route, from Quito to Miami. Likewise, routes from Quito and Guayaquil to Santiago de Chile included stopovers in Lima, Peru.

The airline's livery featured a tailfin logo of alternating blue and white diagonal stripes. The airline operated Lockheed L-188 Electra four-engined turboprop airliners on longer distance scheduled passenger services, including the key Quito-Bogota-Miami route, between March 1967 and March 1975.

=== Empresa Ecuatoriana de Aviación ===
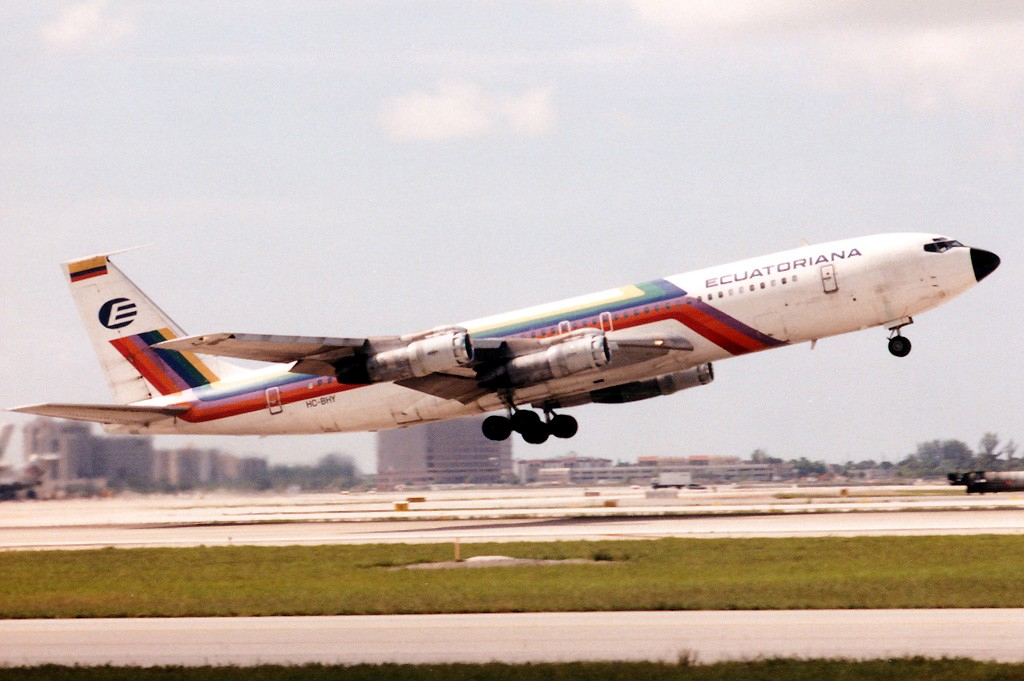
An Ecuatoriana Boeing 707-320B taking off from Miami International Airport (1989)

American investors pulled out of the company during the early 1970s, prompting the creation of a new company. Empresa Ecuatoriana de Aviación, a state-owned company, took over the routes, liabilities, and assets of CEA. It was established in July 1974, becoming the flag carrier of Ecuador. By this time, the airline had modernized its fleet to include the Boeing 707, and a new, colorful "rainbow" livery attracted airplane spotters at new destinations such as New York's John F. Kennedy International Airport and Buenos Aires' Ezeiza International Airport. Some of Ecuatoriana's aircraft became flying canvases for abstract artwork. These distinctively-painted aircraft were seen as a response to Braniff's Alexander Calder-painted aircraft. During the late 1970s and early 1980s, Braniff was Ecuatoriana's main competitor on many routes, including Miami-Quito/Guayaquil.

In the 1970s, most South American national airlines were operated by national air forces. Through the Defence Ministry, the Ecuadorian Air Force bought two refurbished Boeing 707s for the airline from Israeli Aircraft Industries in a deal worth US$4,700,000 (equivalent to $30,683,198 in 2025) million. Ecuatoriana also acquired a Douglas DC-10 from Swissair and opened non-stop routes to Canada. Having jet equipment meant that long flights with stopovers were no longer necessary, and non-stop routes were opened all over South America and to other North American cities.

Ecuatoriana also opened flights to destinations such as Mexico City and Madrid, Spain. The Quito and Guayaquil to Madrid routes in particular proved extremely competitive, as Iberia was popular among travelers who flew those two routes.

During the 1980s, Ecuatoriana de Aviación began conducting business with the European Airbus consortium, buying Airbus A310 jetliners. Ecuatoriana debuted a pair of Airbus A-310s in the early 1990s.

=== Collapse ===
Rumors that government officials flew their family members for free on Ecuatoriana hurt the airline's reputation. During the late 1980s, Ecuatoriana had also developed a reputation for being unreliable. Lengthy flight delays and cancellations were commonplace. Faced with these problems, as well as competition from other carriers such as the privately owned Ecuadorian carrier SAETA, American Airlines (which had assumed Eastern Air Lines' Latin America routes in 1990), and Continental Airlines, which began serving Ecuador from its Houston hub in 1991, Ecuatoriana ceased operations.

Affected by the general economic crisis in South America during the 1990s, Ecuatoriana encountered deep financial problems. The airline stopped flying at the end of September 1993. Some of its leased airplanes, two A310s leased directly from Airbus and its single DC-10 were taken back, with the latter stranded in Panama since Ecuatoriana was not able to meet the lease payments. Ecuatoriana was forced to rely on competitors TAME and SAETA to fly its North and South American routes, after a deal with Costa Rican LACSA broke down. At the end of 1994, SAETA made a $31 million bid in an attempt to acquire Ecuatoriana, but this didn't go through.

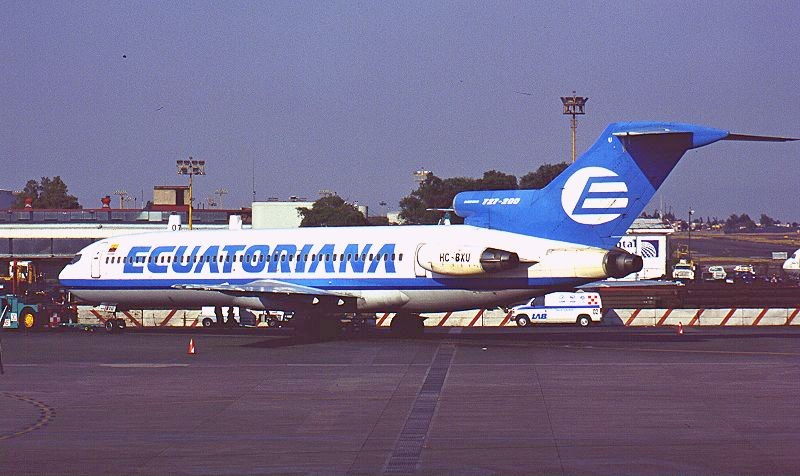
An Ecuatoriana Boeing 727-200 Advanced at Mexico City International Airport. The livery resembles the one used on VASP aircraft. (2000)

After a lengthy privatization process, with the participation of nine consortiums that included ACES, Air France, British Aerospace, Carnival Airlines, Challenge Air Cargo, Continental Airlines, Aerogal and TACA, the consortium led by Brazilian airline VASP (and local investor Juan Eljuri) won the bid through the Guayaquil and Quito stock exchanges, buying 50.1 percent in August 1995 (at $1500 per stock), with a five-year business plan and an effective injection of $10 million during the stock bidding. The government retained the remaining 49.9% and announced it would keep 25% of the remaining stocks (administered by TAME), with 24.9% to be sold within six months. The process was not exempt from political controversy, as the Comptroller, the Supreme Court and the Congress all questioned the process.

With privatization complete, Ecuatoriana received some Boeing 727s, which were repainted in Miami and at Tucson International Airport in Tucson, Arizona. By 1996, short domestic and international services were restarted, with a livery that resembled VASP's. A single DC-10, also borrowed from VASP, allowed the airline to reintroduce services to Madrid's Barajas International Airport.

March 2000 saw the airline flying to Buenos Aires, Cancún, Guayaquil, Manaus, Mexico City, Panama City and Santiago using one Airbus A310-300, three Boeing 727-200 Advanced and one McDonnell Douglas DC-10-30. That year, Ecuatoriana was caught up in the aftermath of the collapse of Ecuador's economy and once again found itself in financial trouble, and VASP decided to sell its part of the airline, with both Aero Continente and Lan Chile being bidders at that time. Despite claims that Lan Chile was not interested in Ecuatoriana, the Chilean carrier was operating its own aircraft on behalf of Ecuatoriana on the lucrative routes to the US after Ecuatoriana's aircraft were repossessed by lessors in late 2000. Following the rejection of Aero Continente's bid and the suspension of Ecuatoriana's air operator certificate, Ecuador's civil aviation authority cleared Lan Chile to start up a subsidiary named Lan Ecuador to fly many international routes previously operated by Ecuatoriana.

Lan Chile owned 50 percent of the airline, wet-leasing two Boeing 767s to the company, but in 2004 sold its part to Lloyd Aéreo Boliviano. By early 2005 LAN had taken over Ecuatoriana's routes and fleet.

== Destinations ==
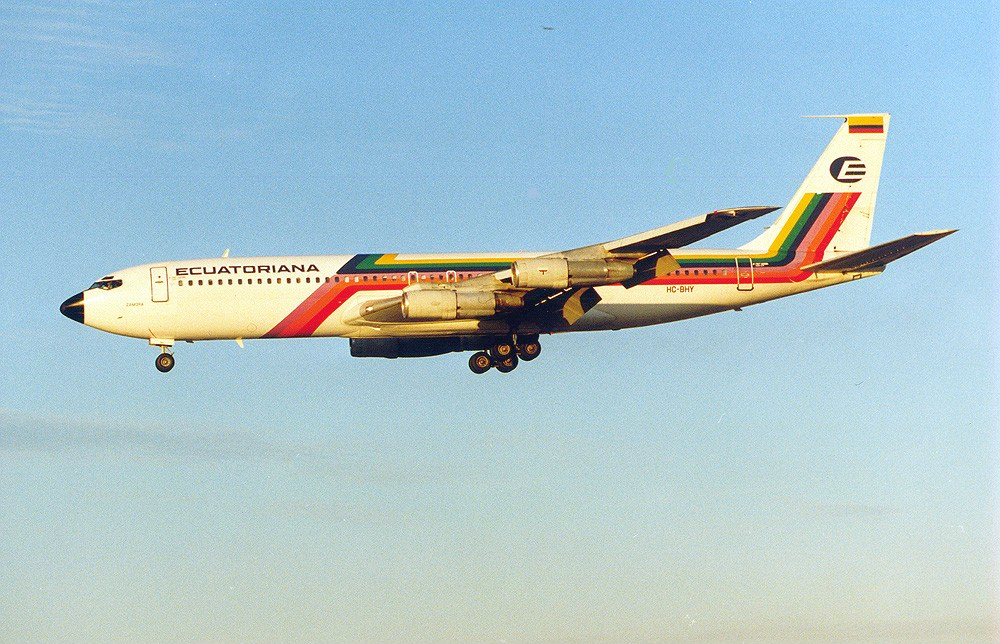
A Boeing 707-320B on short final to Miami International Airport in 1992

Ecuatoriana served the following destinations throughout its history:

City	Airport code		Airport name	Refs
City	IATA	ICAO	Airport name	Refs
Argentina
Buenos Aires	EZE	SAEZ	Ministro Pistarini International Airport	
Bahamas
Nassau	NAS	MYNN	Lynden Pindling International Airport	
Brazil
Manaus	MAO	SBEG	Eduardo Gomes International Airport	
Rio de Janeiro	GIG	SBGL	Rio de Janeiro–Galeão International Airport	
São Paulo	GRU	SBGR	São Paulo–Guarulhos International Airport	
Chile
Santiago	SCL	SCEL	Arturo Merino Benítez International Airport	
Colombia
Bogotá	BOG	SKBO	El Dorado International Airport	
Cali	CLO	SKCL	Alfonso Bonilla Aragón International Airport	
Costa Rica
San José	SJO	MROC	Juan Santamaría International Airport	
Ecuador
Guayaquil	GYE	SEGU	José Joaquín de Olmedo International Airport	
Quito	UIO	SEQU	Mariscal Sucre International Airport	
Mexico
Mexico City	MEX	MMMX	Mexico City International Airport	
Panama
Panama City	PTY	MPTO	Tocumen International Airport	
Peru
Lima	LIM	SPIM	Jorge Chávez International Airport	
Venezuela
Caracas	CCS	SVMI	Simón Bolívar International Airport	
United States
Chicago	ORD	KORD	O'Hare International Airport	
Los Angeles	LAX	KLAX	Los Angeles International Airport	
Miami	MIA	KMIA	Miami International Airport	
New York City	JFK	KJFK	John F. Kennedy International Airport	

== Historical fleet ==
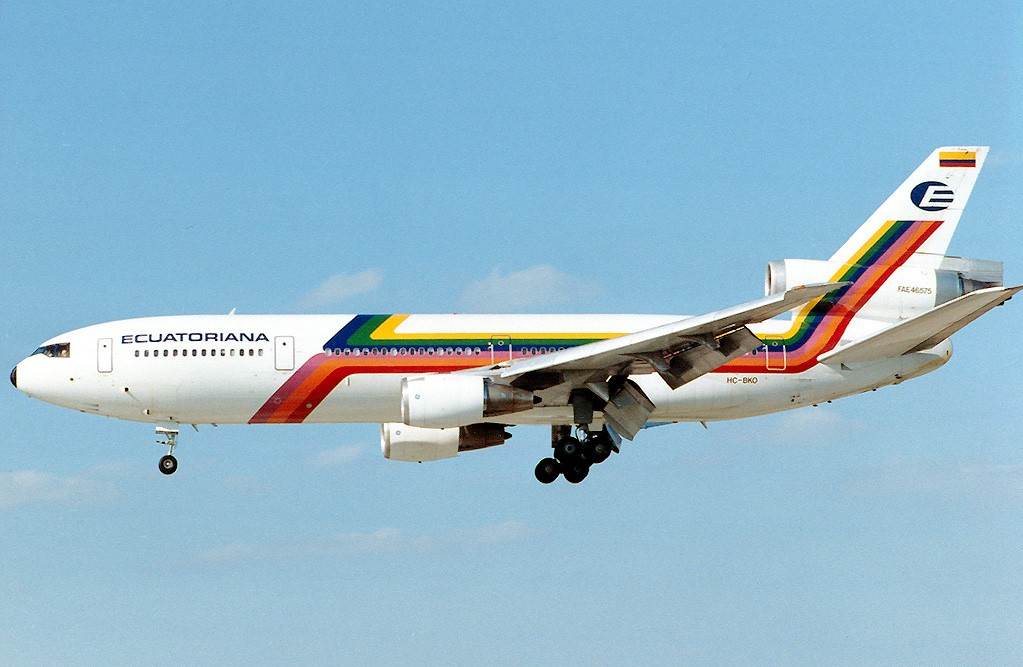
An Ecuatoriana McDonnell Douglas DC-10-30 on short final to Miami International Airport in 1993

The airline operated the following equipment at various times during its history:

- Airbus A310-300
- Boeing 720B
- Boeing 727-200
- Boeing 707-320B
- Boeing 707-320C
- Douglas DC-4
- Douglas DC-6
- Lockheed L-188 Electra
- McDonnell Douglas DC-10-30

== Accidents and incidents ==
- On 14 March 1972, Douglas C-47 HC-SJE was reported to have been damaged beyond economic repair in an accident at Sangay.

== Bibliography ==
- Sherlock, Jay L., Lockheed L-188 Electra and Orion, Air-Britain (Historians) Ltd, 1977, ISBN 0-85130-058-8
- Schleit, P., Shelton's barefoot airlines, Fishergate Publishing Co. Inc., Annapolis (Maryland), 1982
- Davies, R.E.G., Rebels and reformers of the airways, Airlife Publishing Ltd. & Smithsonian Institution Press, 1987
