= VASP =

Airline of São Paulo, Brazil (1933–2005)

VASP Viação Aérea São Paulo

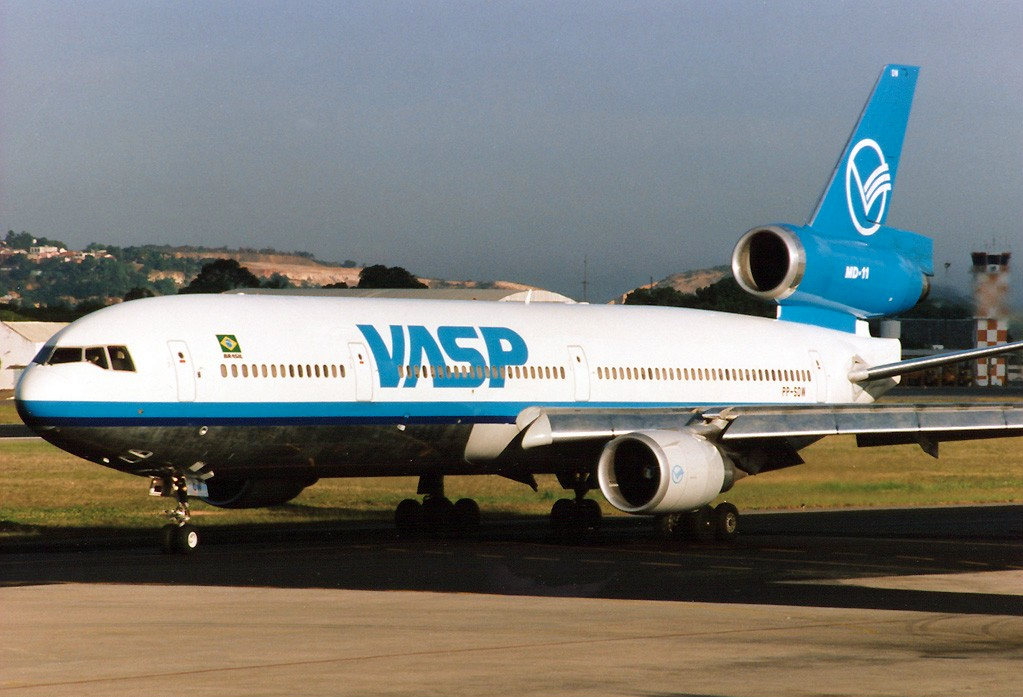
- An MD-11 of VASP
IATA	ICAO	Call sign
VP	VSP	VASP
- Founded: 4 November 1933
- Commenced operations: 12 November 1933
- Ceased operations: 27 January 2005
- Hubs: São Paulo–Congonhas; São Paulo–Guarulhos
- Subsidiaries: VASPEX (São Paulo Airways Express/cargo); Ecuatoriana de Aviación; Transportes Aéreos Neuquén; Lloyd Aéreo Boliviano
- Parent company: Viação Aérea São Paulo
- Headquarters: São Paulo–Congonhas Airport, ,São Paulo, Brazil
- Key people: Wagner Canhedo
- Website: https://web.archive.org/web/19981111190316/http://www.vasp.com.br/ (Archived on the Wayback Machine, 11/11/1998)

Logo used between 1950 and 1985.

Viação Aérea São Paulo S/A (São Paulo Airways), better known as VASP, was an airline with its head office in the VASP Building at São Paulo–Congonhas Airport in São Paulo, Brazil. It had main bases at São Paulo's two major airports, São Paulo–Congonhas Airport (CGH) and São Paulo/Guarulhos International Airport (GRU).

== History ==
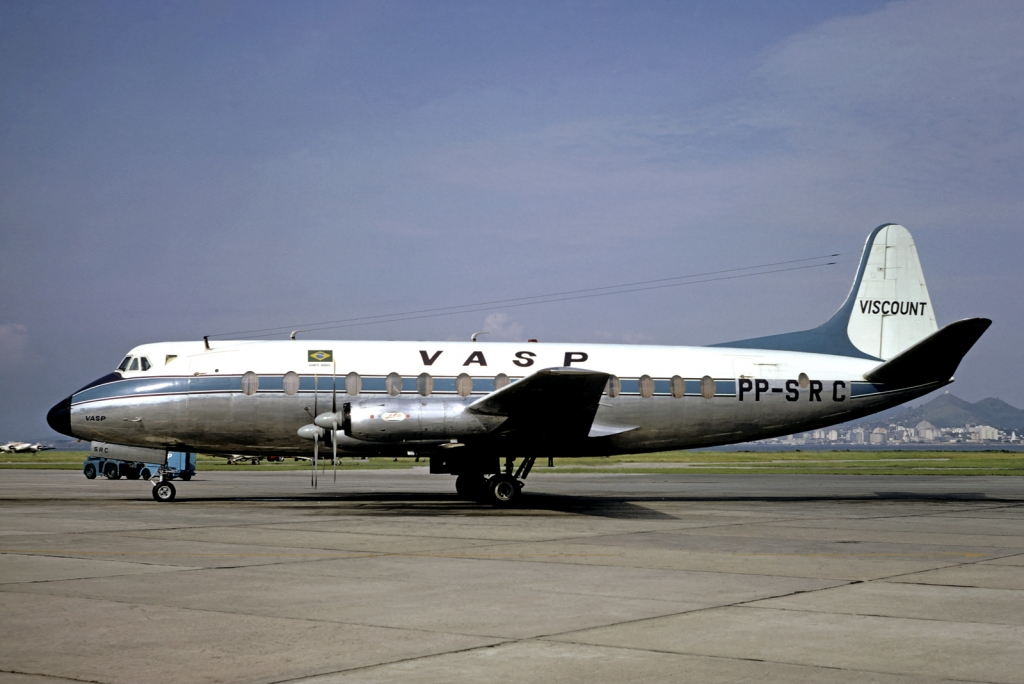
A Vickers Viscount 800 at Rio de Janeiro-Santos Dumont Airport in 1973

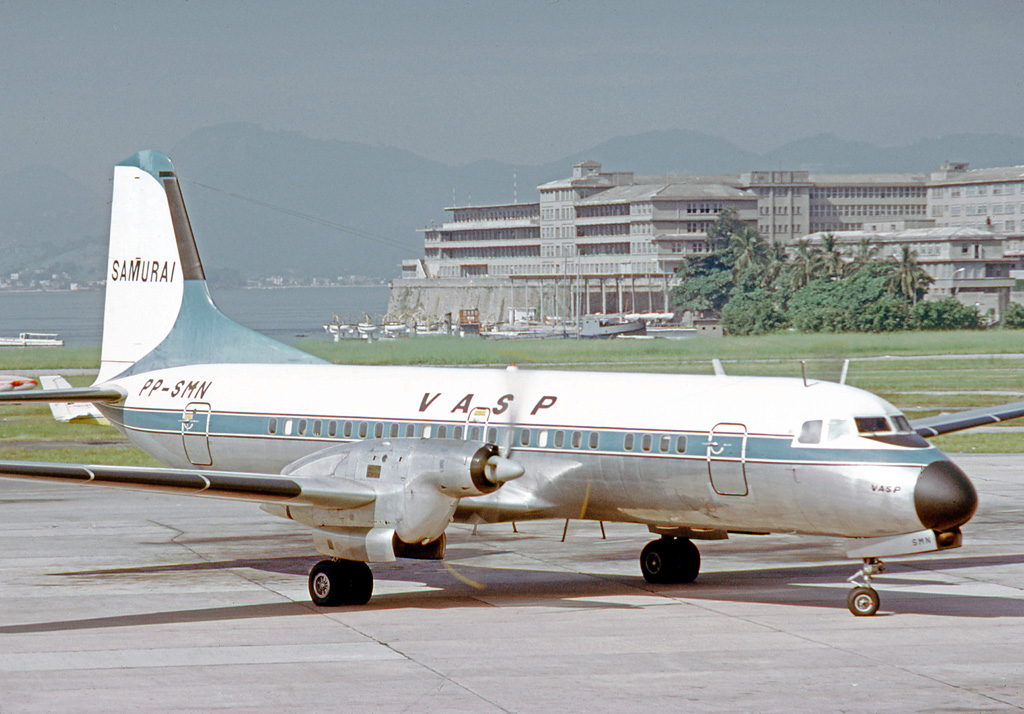
NAMC YS-11 were operated from 1969. This was arriving at Rio de Janeiro-Santos Dumont Airport in 1972.

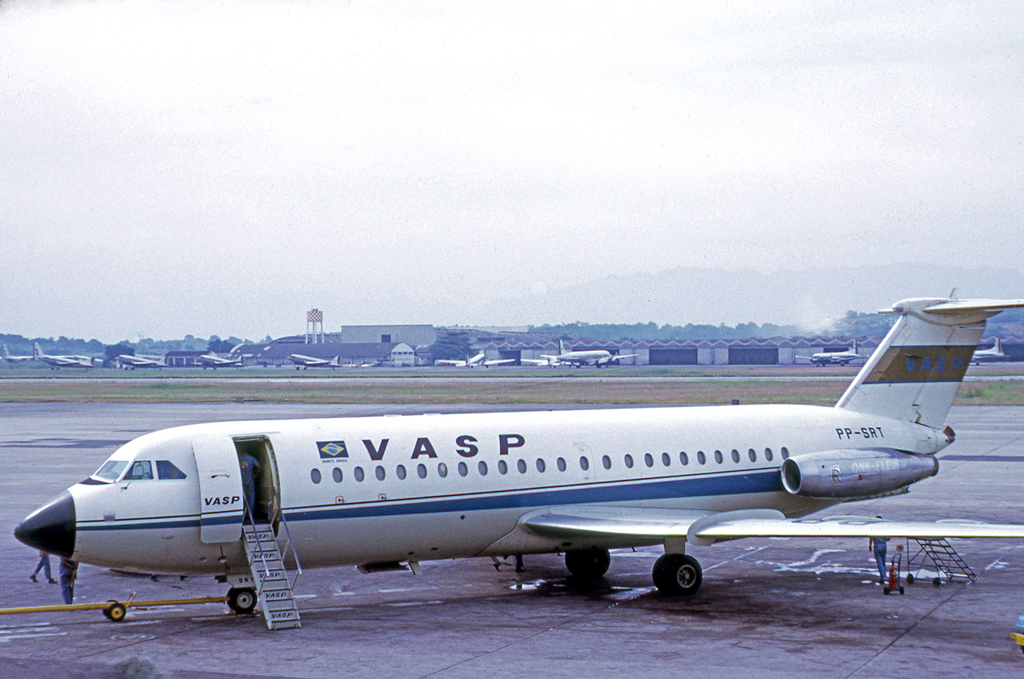
A BAC 1-11 at Rio de Janeiro Galeao airport in 1972

The airline was established on 4 November 1933 by the state government of São Paulo, and began operations on 12 November of that year. VASP was the first airline to serve the interior of the state of São Paulo (São Paulo-São Carlos-São José do Rio Preto and São Paulo-Ribeirão Preto-Uberaba), with two Monospar ST-4s. At the beginning of the 1930s, it was the only carrier to operate with land planes in its service area, an advantage due to the lack of adequate non-coastal airports; many landing strips were improvised on flat pastures. The insistence on land planes led to the 1936 construction of one of Brazil's most important airports: Congonhas in the city of São Paulo, far from the coast. During its early years, Congonhas Airport was popularly known as Campo da VASP ("VASP's airfield").

VASP bought Aerolloyd Iguassu in 1939, including a license to operate flights to the states of Paraná and Santa Catarina. In 1962, VASP became a national airline when it acquired Lóide Aéreo Nacional and its license to operate nationwide.

VASP, Cruzeiro do Sul and Varig initiated air-shuttle service between Rio de Janeiro-Santos Dumont and São Paulo-Congonhas airports on 6 July 1959, the first of its kind in the world. The three companies coordinated their schedules and operations, and shared revenue. The service was a direct response to competition from Real Transportes Aéreos. The idea, Air Bridge (Ponte Aérea in Portuguese), was inspired by the Berlin Airlift. It was successful, continuing until 1999. Flights initially operated on an hourly basis by Convair 240 (Varig), Convair 340 (Cruzeiro) and Saab 90 Scandia (VASP). In a few months the shuttle service led by Varig won the battle against Real, which was bought by Varig in 1961. Sadia Transportes Aéreos joined the service in 1968. It was operated exclusively between 1975 and 1992 by Varig's Lockheed L-188 Electra, which for some time did not have the name "Varig" on the fuselage for neutrality.

Logo used between 1985 and 2001.

Although it had been remarkably well-run for most of its life as a state-owned company, by the 1980s VASP was plagued by inefficiency, losses covered by state-capital injections, and a bloated payroll for political reasons. Under the Brazilian government's new neoliberal policies, VASP was privatized in 1990. A majority stake was bought by the VOE/Canhedo Group, a company formed by the Canhedo Group of Brasília and VASP employees.

Under Wagner Canhedo, its new owner and president, VASP quickly expanded operations in the country and created international routes. Until VASP's entry into the international market, Varig had been Brazil's sole international airline since 1965. After many years of mismanagement, financial losses, debt and bad credit, in 2002 it cancelled its international operations to concentrate on the domestic market. VASP had fallen from the second to fourth place in the Brazilian airline market by then, flying an aging fleet of Boeing 737s (most of them in the obsolete −200 series) and Airbus A300s.

The company faced its worst crisis in 2004 as new airlines rose in the country, which led to the suspension of service to many Brazilian cities and the cancellation of flights. On December 31, 2004 VASP began retiring their Boeing 737-300s. As a result, the airline's domestic market share fell to 10 percent. On 27 January 2005, Brazilian civil-aviation regulator DAC grounded the airline from operating scheduled services pending a financial investigation. VASP was allowed to operate charter services until April 2005, giving it a chance to prove its financial stability and retain its air-operator certificate.

VASP operated Boeing 737-300s around early 1986 and they were officially retired in 2004.

VASP had stopped flying altogether by December 2007, and was reduced to providing maintenance services to other airlines. Even during the worst of the company's troubles, its maintenance expertise and personnel had always been held in high regard. It had been operating under the new Brazilian bankruptcy law since July 2006, and had its recovery plan approved on 27 August of that year. However, VASP declared bankruptcy in 2008.

In October 2020, nine of the company's planes (seven Boeing 737-200s and two Airbus A300s) had been grounded at Congonhas-São Paulo Airport since 2005 and were badly weathered and dilapidated; they began to be dismantled and sold for scrap at auction. Each plane in its current condition was estimated to be worth 30,000 to 50,000 Brazilian Reals (about US$6,000 to $10,000, as of 2025), considerably less than its monthly parking and storage fees. The company's fleet of 27 planes had been grounded in similar circumstances since 2005 at several Brazilian airports.

== Fleet ==
=== Fleet history ===
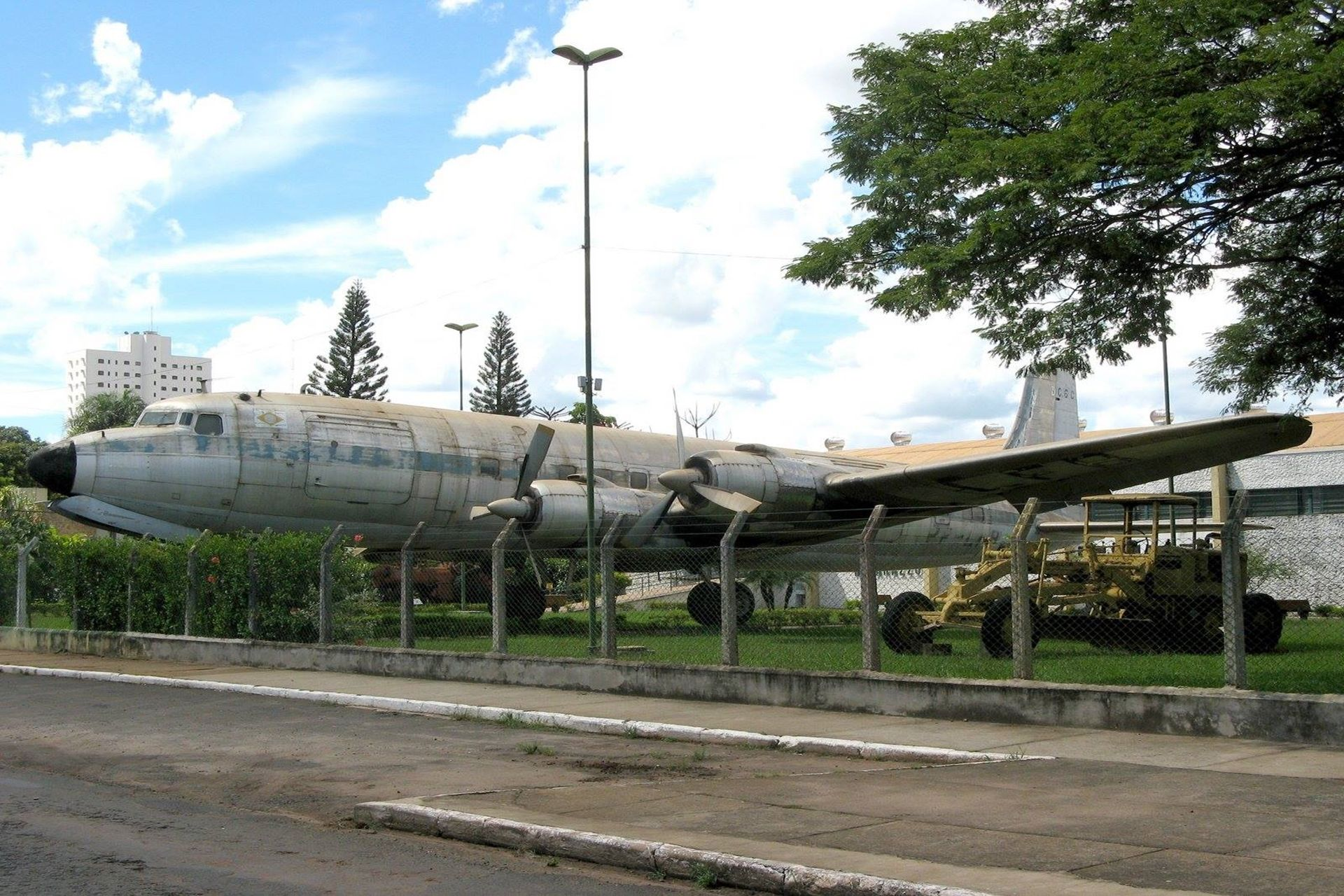
A former VASP Douglas DC 6 at the Bebedouro Museum, the only example of this model to operate in Brazil

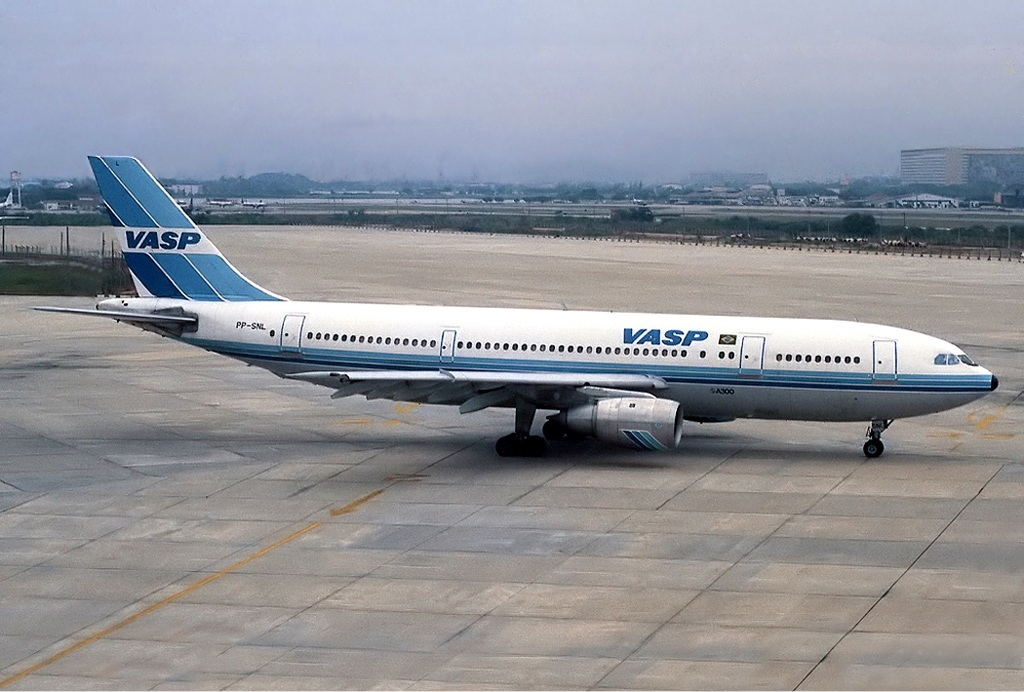
An Airbus A300 at Rio de Janeiro-Galeão International Airport in 1984

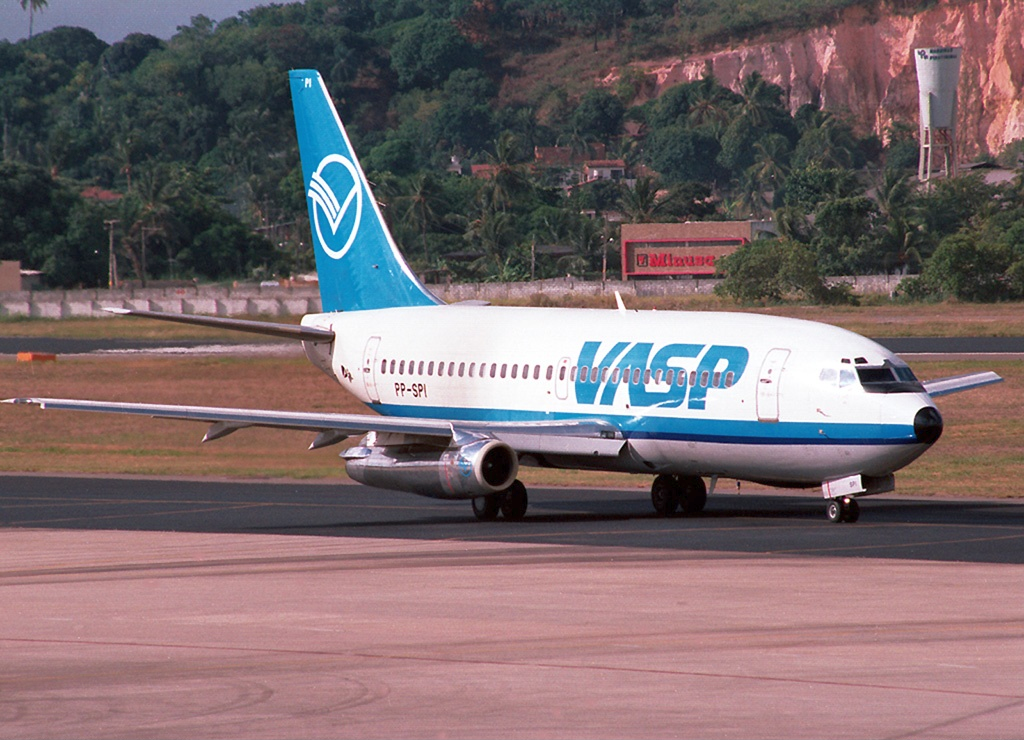
A Boeing 737-200 Advanced at Recife Airport in 1998

VASP had the following aircraft:

VASP fleet
Aircraft	Total	Introduced	Retired	Notes
Airbus A300B2	3	1982	2005	
Airbus A310-300	1	1997	1997	Leased from Ecuatoriana de Aviación
BAC One-Eleven Series 400	2	1967	1974	
Boeing 707-320C	3	1992	1995	
Boeing 727-100C	2	1979	1981	
Boeing 727-200	13	1977	2005	
Boeing 737-200	41	1969	2005	
Boeing 737-300	26	1986	2004	
Boeing 737-400	3	1991	1992	
Curtiss C-46 Commando	14	1962	1973	
de Havilland Dragon	1	1934	1941	
de Havilland Canada DHC-2 Beaver	1	1951	Unknown	
Douglas C-47 Skytrain	9	1946	1981	
Douglas C-54 Skymaster	8	1962	1970	
Douglas DC-3	3	1951	1962	
Douglas DC-6A	4	1962	1977	
Embraer EMB-110 Bandeirante	10	1973	1992	
GAL ST4 Monospar	2	1933	1944	
Junkers Ju 52	7	1937	1957	
Learjet 35A	1	1991	1996	
McDonnell Douglas DC-10-30	6	1991	1996	
McDonnell Douglas MD-11	9	1992	2001	
McDonnell Douglas MD-11ER	1	1998	1998	Leased from World Airways
NAMC YS-11A	8	1968	1977	
Saab 90 Scandia	18	1950	1969	
Vickers Viscount 700	10	1962	1975	
Vickers Viscount 800	6	1958	1975	

=== Fleet in 1970 ===
1970 fleet
Aircraft	Total	Notes
BAC One-Eleven 400	22	
Boeing 737	50	
Douglas DC-3	30	
Douglas DC-6A	4	
Vickers Viscount 700	32	
Vickers Viscount 800	24	
NAMC YS-11	7	
Total	124	

== VASPEX ==
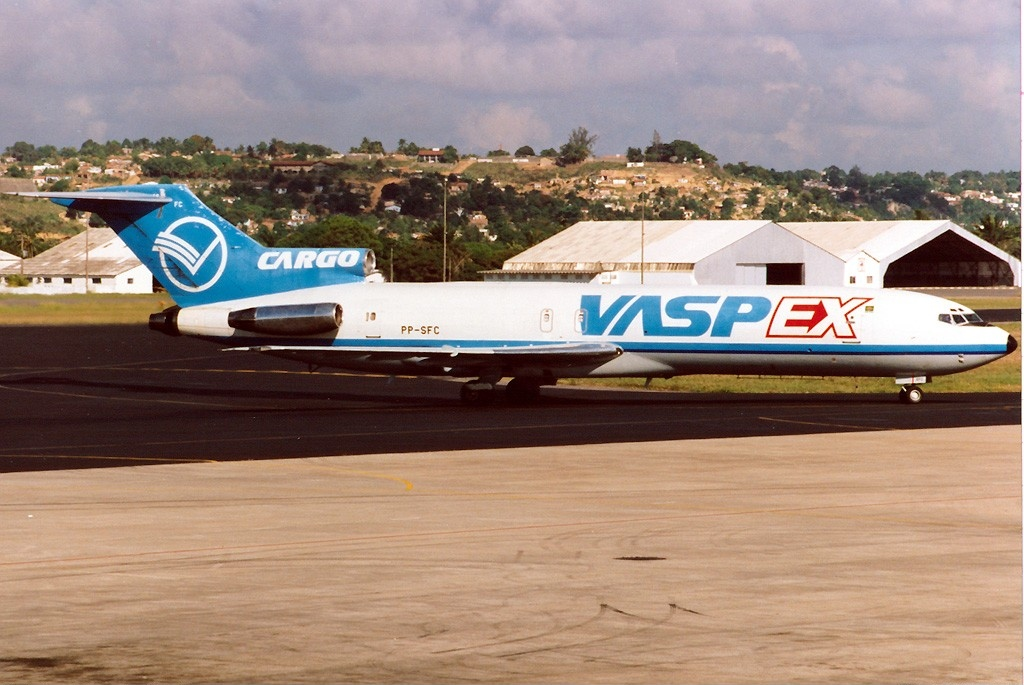
A VASPEX Boeing 727-200F at Recife/Guararapes–Gilberto Freyre International Airport in 1988

VASPEX, VASP's cargo subsidiary, filed for bankruptcy and went bankrupt with VASP on September 4, 2008. It operated the Boeing 727 and 737-200 throughout Brazil.

== Exhibit ==
The third ex-VASP B737, the first operator of the Boeing model in Brazil, is on top of Auto Shopping Só Marcas, a shopping centre in Contagem near the Belo Horizonte border. Registered PP-SMC, the aircraft was manufactured in 1969 and flew with VASP until the company closed. After the company's closure, the aircraft remained at São Paulo–Congonhas Airport for several years before it was bought at auction by the owner of the shopping centre.

The plane has been the scene of several events, and was used in propaganda by the Workers' Party (PT) in 2022;as well as girl who decorated it with World Cup stickers. It was the backdrop for a March 18, 2023 Red Room nighttime event with German DJ Emanuel Satie and Brazilian DJ Jessica Brankka.

== Accidents and incidents ==
=== Accidents ===
- 8 November 1940: a Junkers Ju 52/3mg3e (registration PP-SPF) taking off from Rio de Janeiro-Santos Dumont to São Paulo-Congonhas collided on mid-air with a de Havilland Dragonfly (registration LV-KAB) belonging to the Anglo Mexican Petroleum Company (Shell-Mex) which was preparing for a water landing in front of Fluminense Yacht Club (present-day Rio de Janeiro Yacht Club in Botafogo). Both aircraft crashed, killing all 14 passengers and four crew on the VASP aircraft and the pilot of the Shell-Mex aircraft.
- 27 August 1943: a Junkers Ju 52/3mg3e (registration PP-SPD) flying from São Paulo-Congonhas to Rio de Janeiro-Santos Dumont struck a Naval Academy building near the airport shortly after a second attempt to land at Rio in fog. The aircraft broke in two, and one part fell in the water. Of the 21 passengers and crew, three survived.
- 13 December 1950: a Douglas C-47A (registration PP-SPT) on an initial climb from Londrina lost engine power, crashed and caught fire. There were 3 ground fatalities.
- 18 May 1951: a Douglas C-47B (registration PP-SPL) en route from Santa Cruz do Rio Pardo to Presidente Prudente hit high ground while flying in bad weather. All six passengers and crew died.
- 8 September 1951: a Douglas C-47B (registration PP-SPQ) struck a house after take-off from São Paulo-Congonhas and crashed. Thirteen passengers and crew and three people on the ground died.
- 13 May 1952: a Douglas C-47B (registration PP-SPM) pilot flying from São Paulo-Congonhas to Bauru lost control when carrying out an emergency landing after an engine failure. Two crew members and three passengers died.
- 30 December 1958: a Saab Scandia 90A (registration PP-SQE) flying from Rio de Janeiro-Santos Dumont to São Paulo-Congonhas during a climb after take-off experienced engine failure. The pilot began to return to the airport, but during the second turn the aircraft stalled and crashed into Guanabara Bay. Of the 34 passengers and crew aboard, 20 died.
- 23 September 1959: a Saab Scandia 90A (registration PP-SQV) en route from São Paulo-Congonhas to Rio de Janeiro-Santos Dumont during a climb after take-off did not gain enough height and crashed 1 1/2 minutes out of São Paulo, killing all 20 passengers and crew.
- 22 December 1959: a Vickers Viscount 800 (registration PP-SRG) operating as Flight 233 on approach to Rio de Janeiro-Galeão was involved in a mid-air collision with a Brazilian Air Force Fokker S-11 (T-21) (serial number FAB0742) near Manguinhos Airport. All 32 people aboard the Viscount were killed, in addition to ten on the ground. The T-21 pilot parachuted to safety. The accident led to the eventual closure of Manguinhos Airport.
- 26 November 1962: a Saab Scandia 90A (registration PP-SRA) en route from São Paulo-Congonhas to Rio de Janeiro-Santos Dumont collided in the air over Paraibuna with a private Cessna 310 (registration PT-BRQ) en route from Rio de Janeiro-Santos Dumont to São Paulo-Campo de Marte. Both were flying on the same airway (AB-6) in opposite directions, and did not have visual contact. The crash killed all 23 passengers and crew of the Saab and four occupants of the Cessna.
- 4 September 1964: a Vickers Viscount 701C (registration PP-SRR) operating flight 141 from Vitória to Rio de Janeiro-Santos Dumont collided with a mountain over Nova Friburgo while flying away from the intended track. All 39 passengers and crew died.
- 3 March 1965: a Vickers Viscount (registration PP-SRQ) was damaged beyond repair at Rio de Janeiro/Galeão International Airport when the aircraft left the runway during a simulated engine failure on take-off.
- 31 October 1966: a Vickers Viscount (registration PP-SRM) was damaged beyond repair when it overran the runway at Rio de Janeiro Santos Dumont Airport.
- 15 September 1968: a Vickers Viscount (registration PP-SRE) crashed at São Paulo on a crew-training flight. One of the two crew members was killed.
- 11 January 1969: a Douglas C-47A (registration PP-SPR) was damaged beyond repair at Loanda, Paraná.
- 14 September 1969: a Douglas C-47B (registration PP-SPP) operating flight 555 took off from Londrina to São Paulo-Congonhas. Due to a feathered propeller, it had to return. On approach for landing, the aircraft made a sharp left turn and crashed. All 20 passengers and crew died.
- 12 April 1972: a NAMC YS-11A (registration PP-SMI) flying from São Paulo-Congonhas to Rio de Janeiro-Santos Dumont flew into a mountain on descent 50 km north of Rio de Janeiro due to pilot error. All 25 passengers and crew died.
- 29 January 1973: a Douglas C-47 (registration PP-SQA) crashed on landing at Rondonópolis Airport.
- 15 May 1973: a Vickers Viscount (registration PP-SRD) was damaged beyond economic repair when it departed the runway on landing at Salvador Airport and the undercarriage collapsed.
- 23 October 1973: a NAMC YS-11A (registration PP-SMJ) flying from Rio de Janeiro-Santos Dumont to Belo Horizonte-Pampulha overran the runway during an aborted take-off and slid into Guanabara Bay. Of the 65 passengers and crew, eight passengers died.
- 27 February 1975: an Embraer EMB 110 Bandeirante (registration PP-SBE) operating Flight 640 from São Paulo-Congonhas to Bauru and Araçatuba crashed after take-off from Congonhas. Both crew members and 13 passengers died.
- 25 May 1982: VASP Flight 234, a Boeing 737-200 (registered as PP-SMY), made a hard landing (nose gear first) at Brasília during rain. The gear collapsed and the aircraft skidded off the runway, breaking in two. Two passengers of 118 occupants died.
- 8 June 1982: a Boeing 727-200 (registration PP-SRK) operating Flight 168 from Rio de Janeiro-Galeão to Fortaleza collided with a mountain on approach to Fortaleza. The captain descended below the minimum descent altitude, and all 137 passengers and crew died.
- 28 January 1986: VASP Flight 210 flying from São Paulo-Guarulhos to Belo Horizonte unknowingly tried to take off from Guarulhos in foggy conditions from a taxiway. The take-off was aborted but the aircraft overran, collided with a dyke and broke in two. One passenger died.
- 22 June 1992: a cargo Boeing 737-200C (registration PP-SND), operating as Flight 780 en route from Rio Branco to Cruzeiro do Sul, crashed in the jungle on arrival at Cruzeiro do Sul. The two-person crew and one occupant died.

=== Incidents ===
- 25 April 1970: a Boeing 737-2A1 en route from Brasília to Manaus-Ponta Pelada was hijacked by a person who demanded to be flown to Cuba. The hijack lasted a day.
- 14 May 1970: a Boeing 737-2A1 en route from Brasília to Manaus-Ponta Pelada was hijacked by a person who demanded to be flown to Cuba. The hijack lasted a day.
- 22 February 1975: a Boeing 737-2A1 (registration PP-SMU) en route from Goiânia to Brasília was hijacked by a person who demanded ransom. The hijacker was taken down.
- 29 September 1988: a Boeing 737-300 (registration PP-SNT) operating Flight 375 en route from Porto Velho to Rio de Janeiro via Brasília, Goiânia and Belo Horizonte-Confins was hijacked by one person on the final leg of the flight. The hijacker wanted to force a crash into the Palácio do Planalto, the presidential workplace in Brasília. The pilot convinced the hijacker to divert to Goiânia, where an emergency landing was made. The hijack ended with one victim.
- 18 August 2000: a Boeing 737-2A1 (registration PP-SMG) en route from Foz do Iguaçu to Curitiba-Afonso Pena and on to Rio de Janeiro-Galeão, Brasília, and São Luís was hijacked by five people with the purpose of robbing R$5 million (approximately US$2.75 million) that the aircraft was transporting. The pilot was forced to land at Porecatu, where the hijackers fled with the money. There were no casualties.

== See also ==
- List of defunct airlines of Brazil
