= VASP Flight 210 =

1986 aviation accident in Brazil

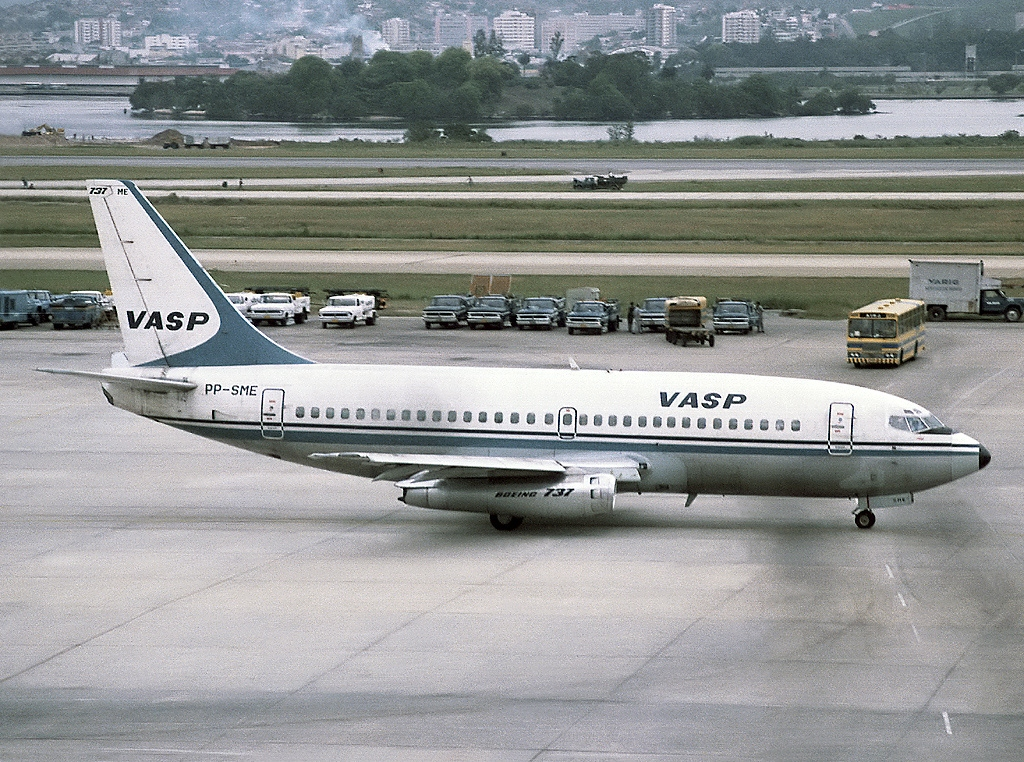
- PP-SME, the aircraft involved in the accident, seen in 1984 with a previous livery

Accident
- Date: 28 January 1986
- Summary: Take-off attempt on taxiway, runway excursion
- Site: São Paulo/Guarulhos International Airport, São Paulo, Brazil

Aircraft
- Aircraft type: Boeing 737-2A1
- Operator: VASP
- IATA flight No.: VP210
- ICAO flight No.: VSP210
- Call sign: VASP 210
- Registration: PP-SME
- Flight origin: São Paulo/Guarulhos International Airport, Guarulhos, Brazil
- Destination: Belo Horizonte Airport, Belo Horizonte, Brazil
- Occupants: 72
- Passengers: 67
- Crew: 5
- Fatalities: 1
- Injuries: 9
- Survivors: 71

VASP Flight 210 was a domestic flight from Guarulhos to Belo Horizonte, Brazil operated by a Boeing 737-200 owned by São Paulo-based Viação Aérea São Paulo (VASP). On 28 January 1986 it ran off the end of the taxiway from which it mistakenly tried to take off, and collided with an embankment, killing one passenger and injuring nine others.

== Aircraft ==
The aircraft involved was a Boeing 737-2A1, tail number PP-SME, that was 16 years and 7 months old. It had its first flight on July 16, 1969. The aircraft was powered by two Pratt & Whitney JT8D-7 turbofan engines.

== Accident ==
On 28 January 1986, dense fog covered the São Paulo/Guarulhos International Airport. The pilots inadvertently lined up with the taxiway instead of runway 09L. At a speed of around 135 knots (250 km/h; 155 mph), take-off was aborted and braking was applied. At 07:32 the aircraft ran off the end of the taxiway and hit a dyke, breaking the front end of the fuselage off, and crumpling the cockpit. One passenger was killed, and the aircraft was written off.

== Cause ==
A combination of intense fog, and pilot's lack of knowledge with the new airport's runway and taxiway configuration caused the crash. A large factor in the incident was also the lack of ground radar and taxiway vehicles.

== See also ==
- Comair Flight 5191 - A similar accident involving a CRJ100 taking off from the wrong runway
- Singapore Airlines Flight 006 - A similar accident involving a Boeing 747 trying to take off from the wrong runway
