= Edson Queiroz =

Brazilian entrepreneur (1925–1982)

Edson Queiroz

Edson Queiroz (April 12, 1925 – June 8, 1982) was a Brazilian entrepreneur, founder of one of the largest business groups in Brazil.

== Biography ==
Edson Queiroz was born on April 12, 1925, in Cascavel, state of Ceará. At the age of 15, he took over the management of Genesio Queiroz Warehouse, belonging to his father. He has attended important schools in the region, including Seminário Arquidiocesano da Prainha and later Liceu do Ceará, where he concluded his technical studies.

In September 1945 he married Yolanda Vidal Queiroz, whom he regarded as just as responsible for his business success as himself.

Edson Queiroz has always refused the standard business model. He was a man of the frontline and well known for getting deep into management issues. Recognized as an honored citizen of the state of Ceará, Edson was always considered ahead of his time.

He was among the 137 people killed in the VASP Flight 168 crash on June 8, 1982 — at the time, the worst accident in Brazilian aviation history.

== Quotes ==
His most famous phrase underlines his life and work ethic:

"If at any time you are caught by surprise by injustice and ingratitude, do not stop believing in life, empowering it by decency, building it by labour."
