= Smith XP-99 Prop-Jet =

Six-seat business aircraft

XP-99 Prop-Jet

General information
- Type: Six seat business aircraft
- National origin: United States
- Manufacturer: Mike Smith Aero Inc
- Designer: Mike Smith
- Number built: 1

History
- First flight: 29 July 1982

The Smith X-99 Prop-Jet was a six-seat turboprop powered business aircraft designed in the United States in the 1980s. Only one was built.

== Design and development ==
The Prop-Jet was an attempt to produce a small, propeller driven business aircraft capable of cruising at speeds above 350 mph (560 km/h). It was powered by a 550 shp (410 kW) Pratt & Whitney Canada PT6 turboprop engine, mounted in a long nose and driving a four blade, constant speed propeller. The fuselage was a monocoque constructed from graphite and glass-fibre epoxy sandwich. The pressurised cabin accommodated pilot and five passengers in three rows of seats, with a baggage space behind. Access was by port side doors forward and another over the trailing edge on the other side. The tail unit was made from Kevlar/graphite/glass fibre epoxy sandwich. The fin was swept and the tailplane mounted, with anhedral, almost at the top of it. The elevator carried an electrically driven trim tab.

To speed the completion of the first prototype, the Prop-Jet used the wing and undercarriage of a Beechcraft Baron 58P, though a composite structure wing was envisaged for production aircraft. The Beech wing was a two spar aluminium box structure, without sweep and mounted between mid and low positions with dihedral of 6° and fitted with slotted Fowler flaps. The tricycle undercarriage was enclosed behind doors after retraction.

The Prop-Jet flew for the first time on 29 July 1982. On 30 September 1984, the Prop-Jet was used to set a world record for speed over a recognised source for a single-engine turboprop when it flew from Johnson City, Kansas to Memphis, Tennessee and then to Atlanta, Georgia, a distance of 1,002 mi (871 nmi; 1,613 km) in 2 hours 37 minutes, at an average speed of 382 mph (332 kn; 615 km/h). By 1985 Mike Smith was reported as seeking financial backers but only the one prototype Prop-Jet was built.

== Specifications ==
Data from Jane's All the World's Aircraft 1985–86 All performance figures at maximum take-off weight except where noted.

General characteristics

- Crew: One
- Capacity: Five passengers
- Length: 30 ft 7 in (9.32 m)
- Wingspan: 37 ft 10 in (11.53 m)
- Height: 10 ft 6 in (3.2 m)
- Wing area: 119.0 sq ft (11.06 m^{2})
- Aspect ratio: 12.02
- Airfoil: modified NACA 23016.5 at root, 23012 at tip
- Empty weight: 3,153 lb (1,430 kg)
- Max takeoff weight: 6,000 lb (2,722 kg)
- Fuel capacity: 220 US gal (832.5 L; 183 Imp gal)
- Powerplant: 1 × Pratt & Whitney Canada PT6A-41 turboprop, 550 hp (410 kW) derated from 634 kW (850 hp)
- Propellers: 4-bladed Hartzell Propeller Type HC-B4TN-3AL/LT1073F-12-5, 7 ft 6 in (2.29 m) diameter constant speed

Performance

- Cruise speed: 325 mph (523 km/h, 282 kn) economical, at 31,000 ft (9,450 m)
- Stall speed: 86 mph (138 km/h, 75 kn) flaps down, power off
- Range: 1,448 mi (2,330 km, 1,258 nmi) with maximum payload
- Ferry range: 1,544 mi (2,485 km, 1,342 nmi) with maximum fuel
- Service ceiling: 31,000 ft (9,400 m) service
- Rate of climb: 3,500 ft/min (17.8 m/s) at sea level at weight of 5,182 lb (2,350 kg)
- Wing loading: 50.0 lb/sq ft (244.1 kg/m^{2})
- Power/mass: 0.093 shp/lb (0.150 kW/kg)
- Take-off distance to clear 50 ft (15 m): 2,376 ft (724 m)
- Landing distance from 50 ft (15 m): 2,498 ft (761 m)

Avionics

- Collins nav/com, ADF, transponder
- Texas Instruments TI-9100C LORAN
- Full blind flying instrumentation
