= Mudry CAP X =

Prototype single-engined two-seat training aircraft

CAP X

General information
- Type: Training aircraft
- National origin: France
- Manufacturer: Avions Mudry
- Number built: 3

History
- First flight: 10 September 1982

The Mudry CAP X is a prototype single-engined two-seat training aircraft built by the French company Avions Mudry. Three examples were built, with the first prototype flying in 1982, but no production following.

== Design and development ==
In early 1981, the French aircraft manufacturer Avions Mudry, builders of the Mudry CAP 10 two-seat aerobatic training aircraft and the single-seater CAP 20 aerobatic aircraft, announced that it was developing a new two-seat, single-engined basic trainer, which was intended to be cheap to buy and have low maintenance requirements. It would be powered by a new engine, also developed by Mudry, the Mudry-Buchoux MB-4-80.

The CAP X is a low-wing cantilever monoplane, with the first prototype's structure largely made of wood, with the wings having a carbon fibre spar. It had a swept-back fin and rudder, with all-moving horizontal tail surfaces. A fixed tricycle landing gear was used, and trainee and instructor sat side-by-side in an enclosed cockpit with a forward sliding canopy. The Mudry-Buchoux MB-4-80 planned as the CAP X's powerplant was a air-cooled four-stoke flat-four piston engine which was claimed to incorporate features based on motor-racing experience. It was rated at 80 hp (60 kW) for take-off and could run on either Avgas or ordinary automobile petrol.

The incomplete prototype was exhibited at the 1981 Paris Air Show, and, registered F-WZCJ, flew for the first time on 10 September 1982 powered by the Mudry-Buchouz engine. The aircraft completed its initial tests in March 1983 following which it was re-engined with a 108 hp (81 kW) Avco Lycoming engine, with which it flew again on 4 May 1983 with the new designation CAP X Super. (Note: The development of the CAP X Super was prompted by the fact that the Mudry-Buchoux engine was still under development.) The CAP X Super was exhibited at the 1983 Paris Air Show. A second pre-production prototype, with an all-wooden structure, a new wing section, more fuel and powered by a 112 hp (84 kW) Avco Lycoming O-235 engine, which was intended to serve as an aerobatic trainer, flew for the first time on 13 June 1985. Type certification was expected to follow in 1986.

In 1988, it was reported that production plans had been indefinitely postponed. Work restarted on the CAP X as a result of interest from several French flying schools in an aerobatic trainer which would be suitable to give basic aerobatic instruction to students before they started training on airliners. The new version, designated CAP X4 would have a tailwheel undercarriage and be powered by a 112 hp (84 kW) O-235-N2A engine. A third prototype with a tailwheel undercarriage, registration F-PRCT was built in 1994. In January 1991, the Soviet design bureau Sukhoi signed an agreement to build the CAP X4 while Mudry would get the Sukhoi Su-26MX aerobatic aircraft certified in France. These plans had been abandoned, however, by 1995.

== Variants ==
CAP X
Original two seat trainer, powered by 80 hp (60 kW) Mudry-Buchoux MB-4-80 engine.
CAP X Super
Modified first prototype, powered by 108 hp (81 kW) Avco Lycoming engine.
CAP X4
Two-seat aerobatic trainer, with tailwheel undercarriage and powered by 112 hp (84 kW) Textron Lycoming O-235 engine.
Mini-CAP
Proposed single seat aerobatic trainer derivative of original CAP X.

== Specifications (First prototype, MB-4 engine) ==
Data from Jane's All the World's Aircraft 1983–1984

General characteristics

- Crew: 2
- Length: 5.90 m (19 ft 4 in)
- Wingspan: 8.00 m (26 ft 3 in)
- Height: 2.05 m (6 ft 9 in)
- Wing area: 9.00 m^{2} (96.9 sq ft)
- Aspect ratio: 7.1:1
- Airfoil: ONERA OAAG 04
- Empty weight: 340 kg (750 lb)
- Max takeoff weight: 530 kg (1,168 lb)
- Fuel capacity: 55 L (12 imp gal; 15 US gal)
- Powerplant: 1 × Mudry Buchoux MB-4-80 flat-four, 60 kW (80 hp)
- Propellers: 2-bladed fixed-pitch, 1.55 m (5 ft 1 in) diameter

Performance

- Cruise speed: 189 km/h (117 mph, 102 kn) at 1,500 m (4,900 ft) (max cruise)
- Stall speed: 82 km/h (51 mph, 44 kn)
- Never exceed speed: 287 km/h (178 mph, 155 kn)
- Range: 740 km (460 mi, 400 nmi)
- g limits: +4.4, -1.8

== Bibliography ==
- Jackson, Paul, ed. (1995). Jane's All the World's Aircraft 1995–96. Coulsdon, UK: Jane's Information Group. ISBN 0-7106-1262-1.
- Lambert, Mark, ed. (1990). Jane's All the World's Aircraft 1990–91. Coulsdon, UK: Jane's Defence Data. ISBN 0-7106-0908-6.
- Lambert, Mark, ed. (1992). Jane's All the World's Aircraft 1992–93. Coulsdon, UK: Jane's Data Division. ISBN 0-7106-0987-6.
- Simpson, R. W. (1995). Airlife's General Aviation (2nd ed.). Shrewsbury, UK: Airlife Publishing Limited. ISBN 1-85310-577-5.
- Taylor, John W R., ed. (1981). Jane's All the World's Aircraft 1981–1982. London: Jane's Publishing Company Limited. ISBN 0-7106-0729-6.
- Taylor, John W R., ed. (1983). Jane's All the World's Aircraft 1983–84. London: Jane's Yearbooks. ISBN 0-7106-0780-6.
- Taylor, John W R., ed. (1985). Jane's All the World's Aircraft 1985–86. London: Jane's Yearbooks. ISBN 0-7106-0821-7.
- Taylor, John W R., ed. (1986). Jane's All the World's Aircraft 1986–87. London: Jane's Yearbooks. ISBN 0-7106-0835-7.
- Taylor, John W R., ed. (1988). Jane's All the World's Aircraft 1988–89. Coulsdon, UK: Jane's Defence Data. ISBN 0-7106-0867-5.
- Taylor, Michael, ed. (1983). Jane's 1983–1984 Aviation Review (3rd ed.). London: Jane's Publishing Company. ISBN 0-7106-0285-5.
