= Pico da Caledônia =

Peak of Serra do Mar

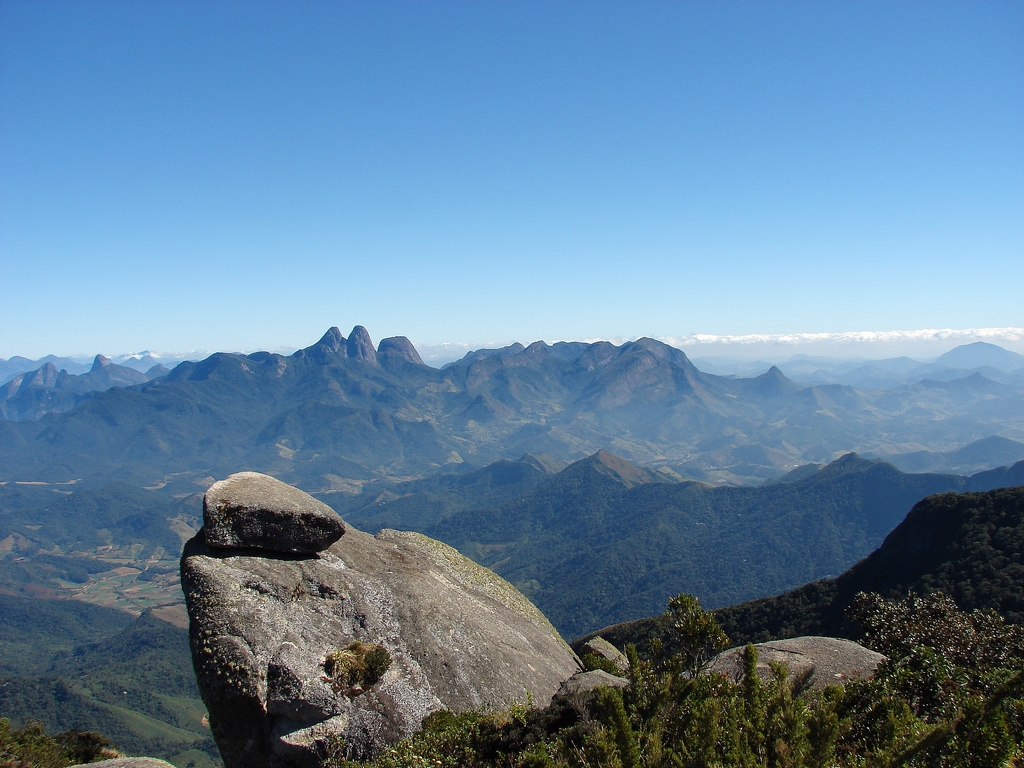
View of Pico da Caledônia of Pedra Coração de Boi

Pico da Caledônia (Brazilian Portuguese pronunciation: [ˈpi.ku da ka.leˈdo.ni.ɐ]) is one of the highest peaks in the Serra do Mar mountain range, standing at 2.257 metres (7 ft).

The most common and safest route is via the Cascatinha neighbourhood, in the southern part of Nova Friburgo, via the Caledônia Road.
