= VASP Flight 234 =

1982 aviation accident in Brazil

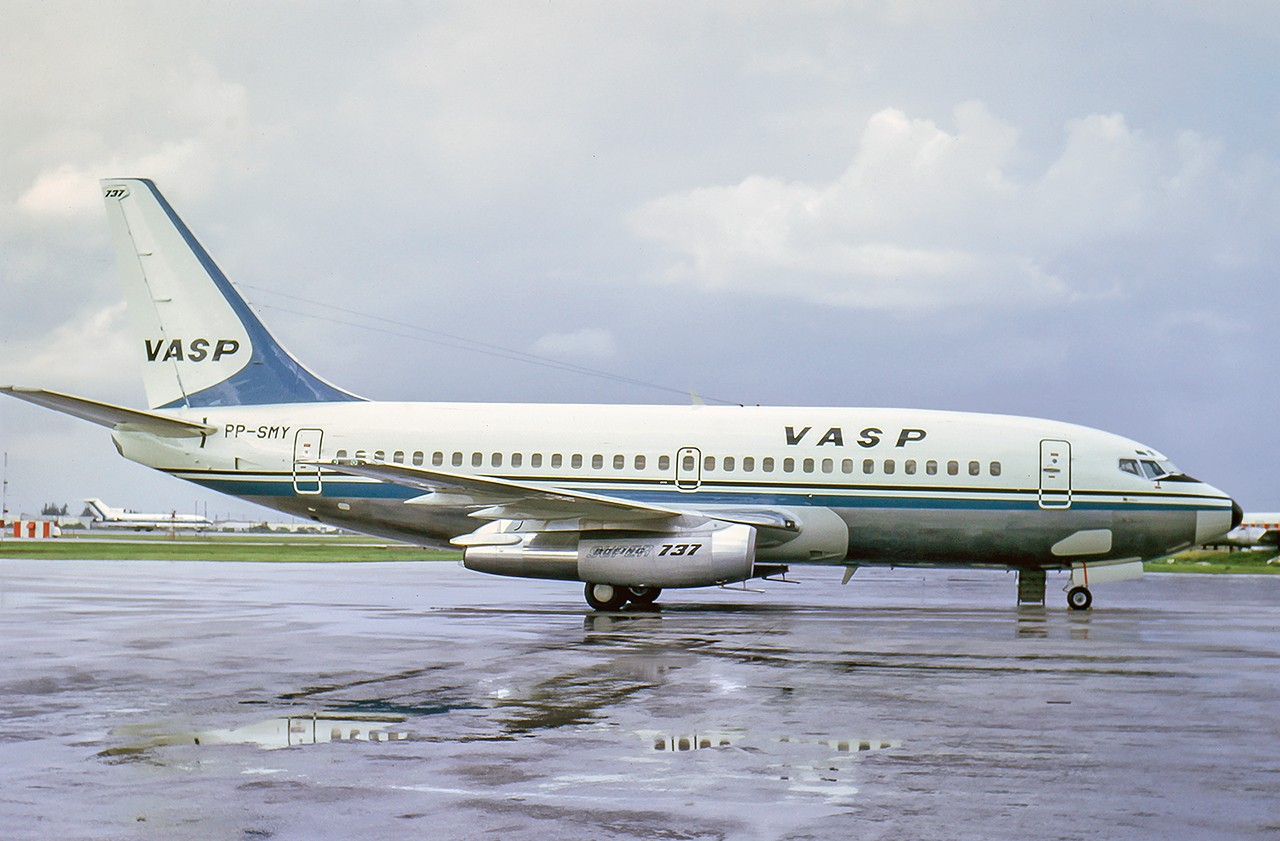
- The aircraft involved, seen in October 1974

Accident
- Date: 25 May 1982
- Summary: Runway excursion
- Site: Brasília International Airport, Brasília, Brazil

Aircraft
- Aircraft type: Boeing 737-2A1
- Operator: VASP
- IATA flight No.: VP234
- ICAO flight No.: VSP234
- Call sign: VASP 234
- Registration: PP-SMY
- Flight origin: São Paulo–Congonhas Airport, São Paulo, Brazil
- Destination: Brasília International Airport, Brasília, Brazil
- Occupants: 118
- Passengers: 112
- Crew: 6
- Fatalities: 2
- Injuries: 17
- Survivors: 116

VASP Flight 234 was a domestic flight of the Viação Aérea São Paulo (VASP) airline from São Paulo-Congonhas Airport to Brasília International Airport. On May 25, 1982, an accident involving a Boeing 737-2A1 registered as PP-SMY occurred on this flight when the captain landed the aircraft incorrectly due to an optical illusion, causing the aircraft to skid off the runway. Two passengers were killed in the accident, while the remaining 116 occupants on board survived.

== Aircraft ==
The aircraft involved was a Boeing 737-2A1, which was 7 years and 8 months old at the time of the accident. It was assembled at Boeing's factory in Renton, Washington, and first flew on 24 September 1974, before being delivered to VASP in October. The aircraft had the serial number 20970 and was the 376th Boeing 737 from current production. The aircraft was registered with the aircraft registration PP-SMY. The twin-engine narrow-body aircraft was equipped with two Pratt & Whitney JT8D-7 engines.

== Accident ==
The flight from São Paulo to Brasília initially went without any special incidents. The landing in Brasília was carried out at 23:40 in heavy rain. When landing, the aircraft touched down with the nose gear first. This then collapsed under the load. The aircraft went left the runway and broke into two pieces near row 12. Most people were injured there. Two passengers were killed and 17 others were injured.

== Cause ==
It was determined that the captain had previously activated the system to spray the cockpit window with a rain deflector liquid. The incorrect use of the agent resulted in an optical illusion in the rain, causing the captain to touch down the aircraft first with the nose landing gear instead of with the main landing gear as intended.

It was also revealed that the captain had visited a doctor shortly before the flight and complained of ongoing health problems. However, he claimed that he was still able to work and stated that he had to take the flight to Brasília. Other VASP pilots complained that they were under a lot of work pressure from the airline and blamed the tense working atmosphere on the state airline's vice president, Alex Barroso, who was also the commander of the Brazilian Air Force. The aviation authority explained that the meteorological conditions at the time accident would have been above the required minimum.
