= VASP Flight 168 =

1982 aviation accident in Brazil

Coordinates: 3°46′52″S 38°52′19″W

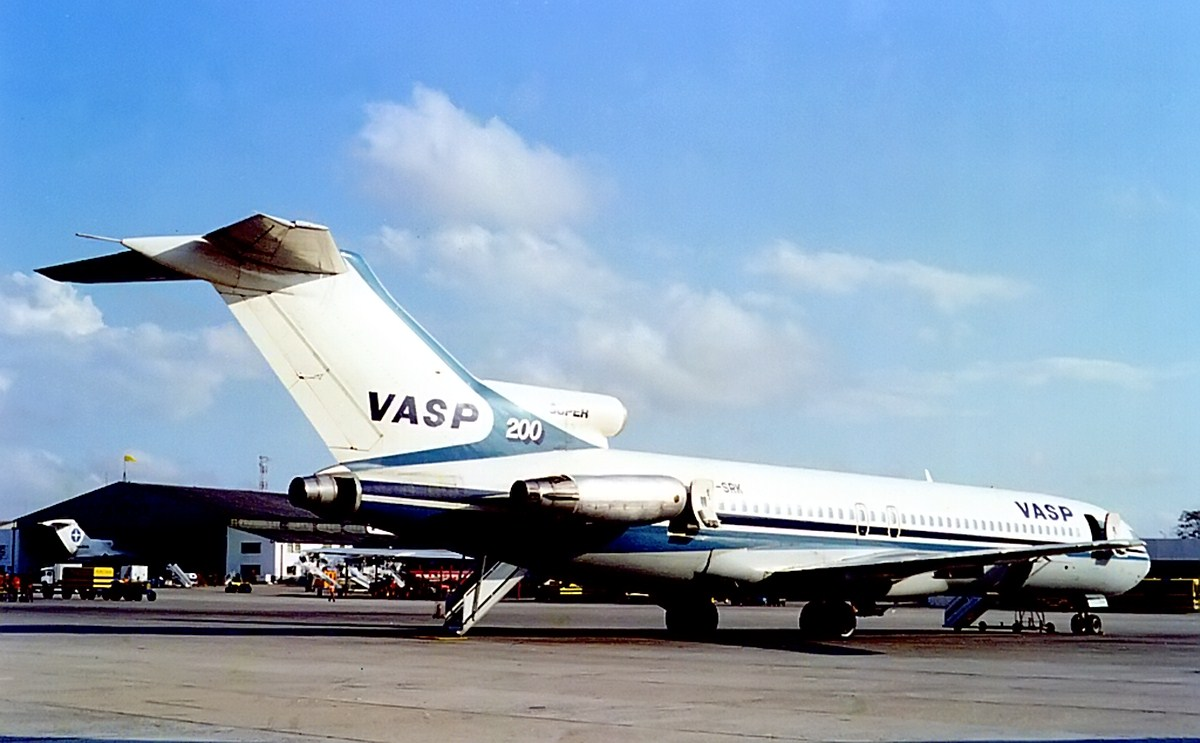
- PP-SRK, the aircraft involved in the accident

Accident
- Date: June 8, 1982
- Summary: Controlled flight into terrain due to pilot error
- Site: Aratanha Mountains, near Pacatuba, CE, Brazil

Aircraft
- Aircraft type: Boeing 727-212
- Operator: VASP
- IATA flight No.: VP 168
- ICAO flight No.: VSP 168
- Call sign: VASP 168
- Registration: PP-SRK
- Flight origin: Congonhas Airport, São Paulo, Brazil
- Stopover: Galeão International Airport, Rio de Janeiro, Brazil
- Destination: Pinto Martins International Airport, Fortaleza, Brazil
- Occupants: 137
- Passengers: 128
- Crew: 9
- Fatalities: 137
- Survivors: 0

VASP Flight 168, a Boeing 727-212 registered PP-SRK, was a scheduled domestic passenger flight from São Paulo to Fortaleza, Brazil which, on June 8, 1982, crashed into a mountainside, while descending into Fortaleza, killing all 137 people on board.

The crash of Flight 168 remains both the largest death toll of a Brazilian aircraft accident from the 20th century and the third-highest death toll of any aviation accident in Brazil after Gol Transportes Aéreos Flight 1907 and TAM Airlines Flight 3054.

== Passengers and crew ==
Flight 168 carried 128 passengers and 9 crew members. Captain Fernando Antônio Vieira de Paiva, age 43, had spent over 15,000 hours in the air. First officer Carlos Roberto Duarte Barbosa, age 28, had logged over 5,000 hours. Engineer José Erimar de Freitas, age 31, had accumulated only 279 hours in the air since his qualification as a flight engineer in 1979, though he had been with VASP since 1971 as an aircraft engineer.

Notably, the passengers included Brazilian business magnate Edson Queiroz, whose self-titled conglomerate had pioneered the nation's shift from wood-burning stoves to gas stoves. Queiroz had originally purchased a ticket for a Varig flight the following morning, but, uncertain it would arrive in time for an early meeting in Fortaleza, exchanged it for a seat on VASP Flight 168 shortly before takeoff.

== Accident ==
Flight 168's first leg was from São Paulo to Rio de Janeiro, which was completed uneventfully. The flight then departed Rio de Janeiro for Fortaleza. As the flight approached its destination, it was cleared to descend from its cruising altitude of flight level 330 – approximately 33,000 feet (10,000 m) mean sea level – to 5,000 feet (1,500 m). Flying at night, with the lights of the city of Fortaleza in front, the Boeing 727 descended through its 5,000-foot (1,500 m) clearance limit, and kept descending until it crashed into a mountainside at 2,500 feet (760 m), killing all 137 on board.

== Investigation ==
The investigation revealed that the captain, possibly disoriented due to bright lights from the city ahead, continued the descent well below the 5,000 feet (1,500 m) clearance limit, despite being warned twice by the ground proximity warning system and the co-pilot of the terrain ahead. As the aircraft kept descending, it struck a wooded mountainside at 2,500 feet (760 m) and crashed.

== See also ==
- Sensory illusions in aviation
