= Battle of Palmar (1866) =

Part of the Paraguayan War

- Part of the Humaitá campaign
Date	September 2, 1866
Location	Paraguay River, Paraguay
Result	Brazilian victory

Belligerents
Empire of Brazil	Paraguay

Commanders and leaders
Viscount of Porto Alegre	Unknown

Strength
+10,000 soldiers 10 warships	Unknown

Casualties and losses
70 dead	Unknown

The Battle of Palmar was a confrontation of the Paraguayan War between a squad of the Brazilian Armada and army troops against a group of Paraguayan soldiers on the Paraguay River, fought on September 2, 1866 and which resulted in victory for the allies.

== The Battle ==
Palmar was an island in the Paraguay River near the blockade station of the Brazilian fleet. On September 1, 1866, the 2nd Army Corps commanded by the Baron of Porto Alegre embarked on squadron ships to disembark close to the defensive lines of Curuzú. At dawn the next day, the battleship Tamandaré, the warships Forte de Coimbra and Pedro Afonso, three flatboats and the wooden ships Araguaia, Beberibe, Greenhalg, Ivaí, Ipiranga, Araguari and Parnaíba started a heavy bombardment of the island and its surroundings, sweeping the defenders Paraguayans who were there. At 3 pm troops from Porto Alegre disembarked on the island and started a fight with the remnants of the defenders losing 70 men, but they were successful in disembarking.

== Bibliography ==
- Scheina, Robert L. (2003). Latin America's Wars. Brassey's inc. ISBN 978-1-57488-451-7.
