= Brazilian corvette Jequitinhonha =

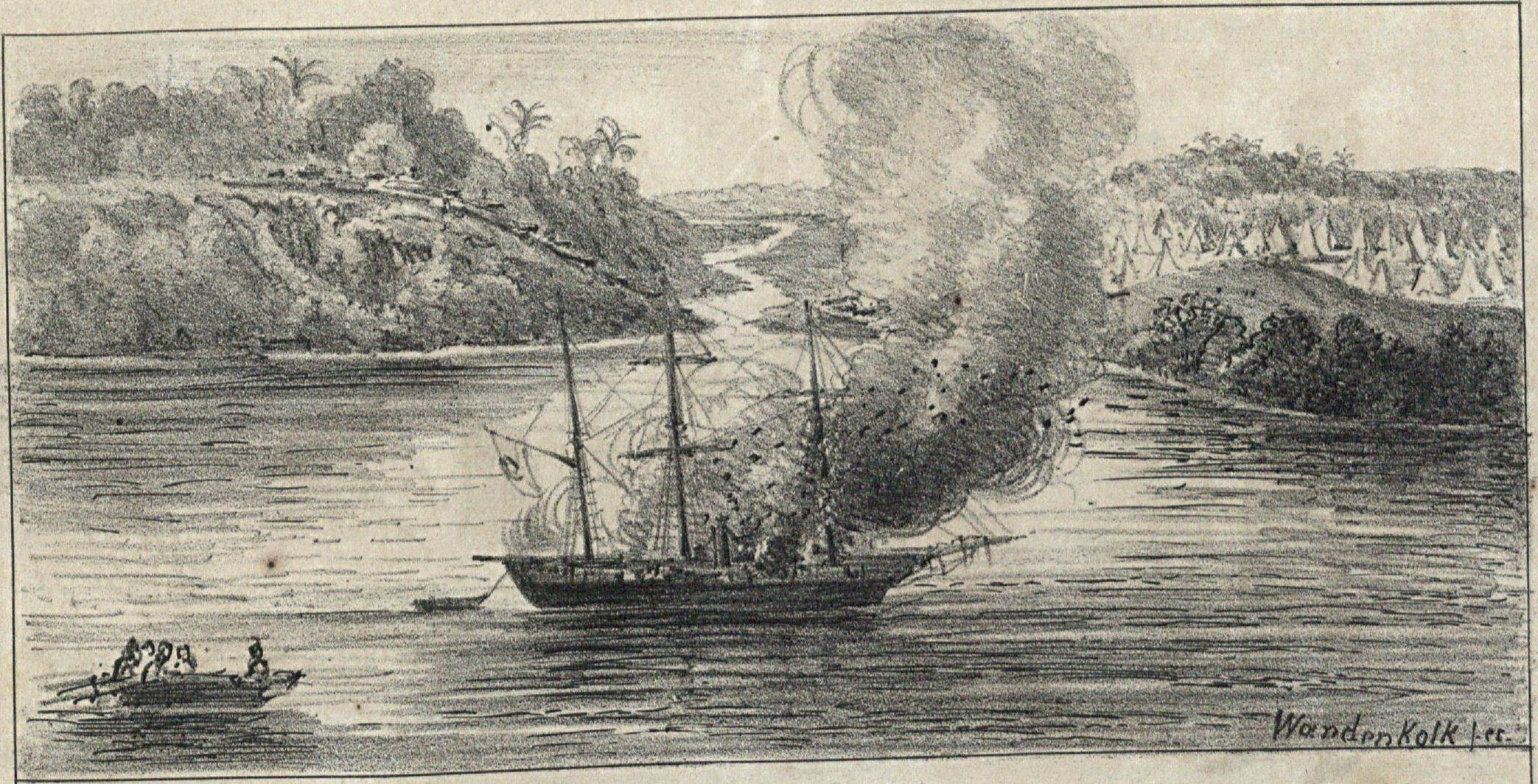
- The Jequitinhonha on fire

History

Empire of Brazil
- Namesake: Jequitinhonha River

General characteristics
- Class & type: Corvette
- Displacement: 637 tonnes
- Beam: 7.92m
- Draft: 3.81
- Propulsion: 130hp steam engine
- Armament: 6 32-caliber guns, 1 38-caliber gun

The steam corvette Jequitinhonha was a warship in the Imperial Brazilian Navy during the Paraguayan War. It took part in the Battle of Riachuelo.

== 1854-65 ==
The Jequitinhonha is the only ship in the history of the Brazilian Navy to bear this name. It was built in Britain in the early 1850s, and arrived in Brazil on 25 January 1854. There it was named Jequitinhonha after the rivers of the same name in Minas Gerais and Bahia. Its first commander was Joaquim Raimundo de Lamare. In 1864 it was assigned to the naval division commanded by pt:Francisco Pereira Pinto, hunting ships of the Uruguayan Navy.

On a mission to blockade Paraguayan ports, the Jequitinhonha was assigned to the naval division commanded by José Segundino de Gomensoro on 5 April 1865. Now under the command of Joaquim José Pinto, the corvette left for Buenos Aires on 30 April as flagship of Gomensoro's 3rd Division, together the frigate Amazonas, the corvettes Beberibe, Belmonte and Parnahyba and the gunboats Araguary, Mearim, Ipiranga and Iguatemy commanded by Admiral Barroso. Their mission was to prevent the Paraguayans from crossing the River Paraná.

== Battle of Riachuelo ==
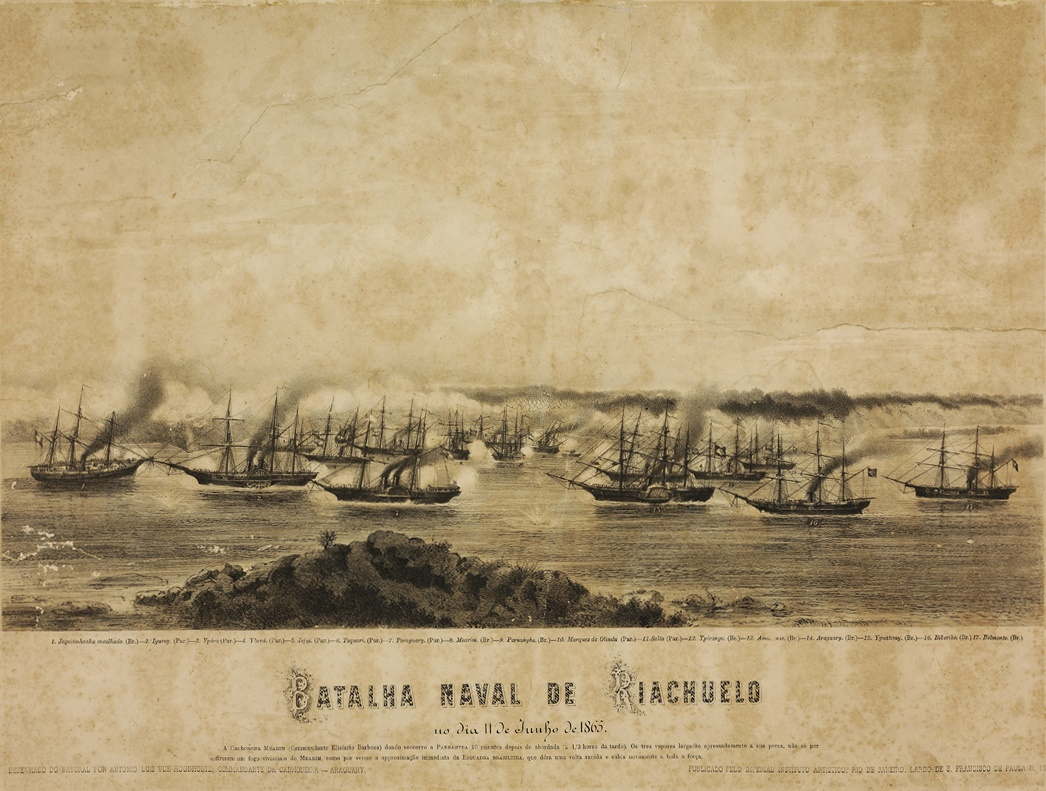
the Jequitinhonha (left) trapped on a sandbar during the Battle of Riachuelo

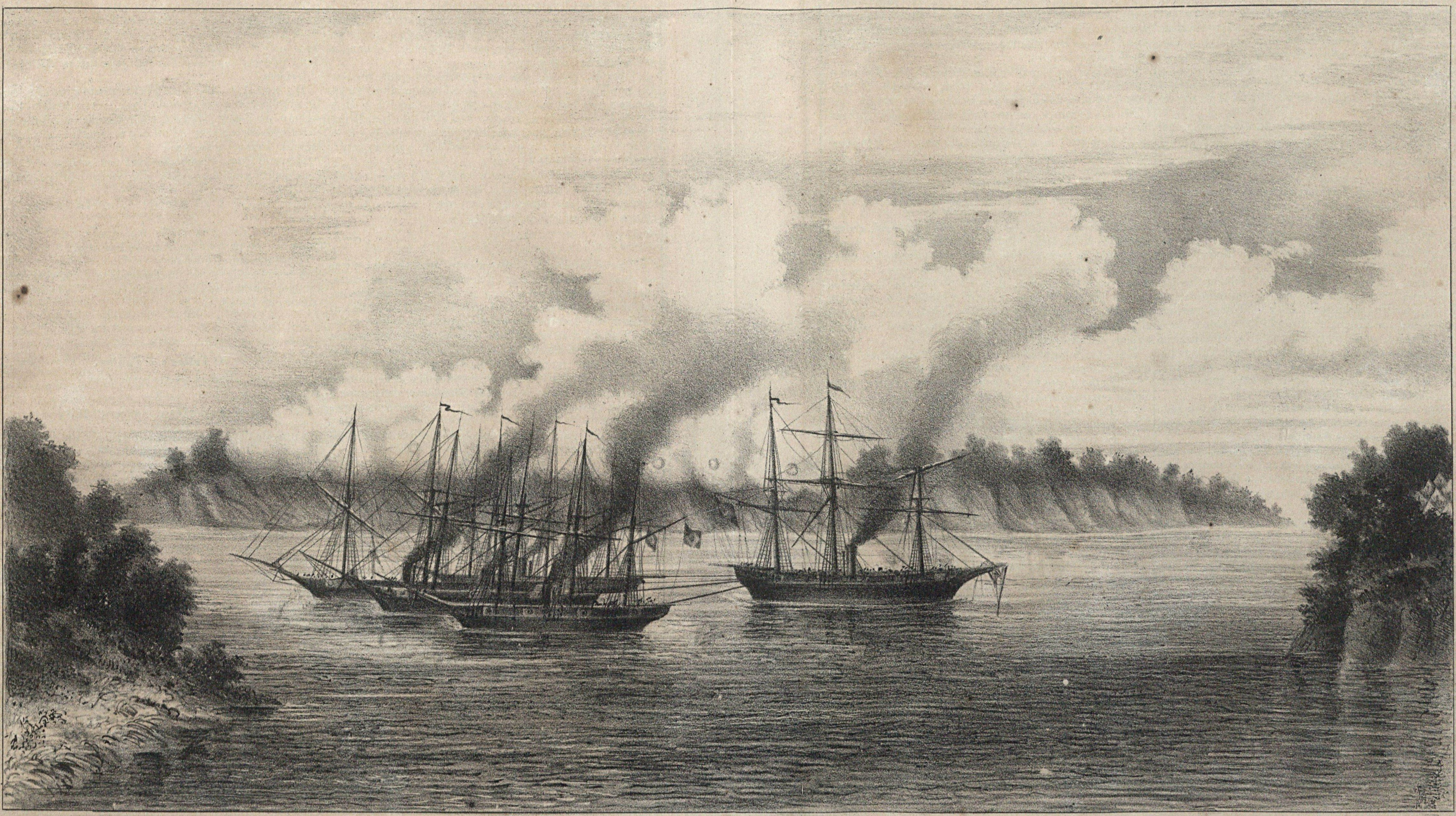
The Ypiranga, Mearim, Araguary and Iguatemy trying to refloat the Jequitinhonha

On 11 June 1865 the Jequitinhonha took part in the Battle of Riachuelo. The Paraguayan fleet made a surprise attack in the morning, before the Brazilian ships had made steam. The Jequitinhonha, closest to the advancing Paraguayans, was ordered to engage with them without delay.

The Paraguayan fleet fired on the Brazilians as it passed downriver and took up defensive positions. As the Brazilians pursued them, most of them kept to the main channel of the river, but the Jequitinhonha and one other ship tried to make way by a side channel. Apparently Commander Pinto decided to fire on the Paraguayan shore batteries, which required him to turn the ship in the river. In the middle of this manoeuvre the ship ran aground on a sandbar.

She was the second-heaviest ship in the Brazilian Navy and was carrying 200 marines. When the shore batteries turned their fire on her, one of the first to be killed was the local pilot, leaving the ship unable to make its way off the sandbar. Gomensoro, commanding the marines, continued to fire with as many of the ship's guns as could be brought to bear on the enemy while it remained trapped.

Three Paraguayan vessels, the (pt)Tacuarí, the (pt) Salto Oriental and the Vapor Marquês de Olinda now made a series of determined attempts to board and capture the Jequitinhonha, but were unable to do so as it maintained constant fire. The Brazilian ship Parnahyba tried to rescue the Jequitinhonha, but also got into trouble as she turned to help, damaging her rudder.

After the battle, the Brazilians tried all night and much of the following day to pull the Jequitinhonha free, but in the end Pinto and his crew abandoned the ship. The Paraguayans then boarded her and seized her guns. They also cut away her mainyard and took it as a trophy to Humaita, where it was later used as the central column of a dancehall.

== See also ==
- List of historical ships of the Brazilian Navy
