= Brazilian frigate Amazonas =

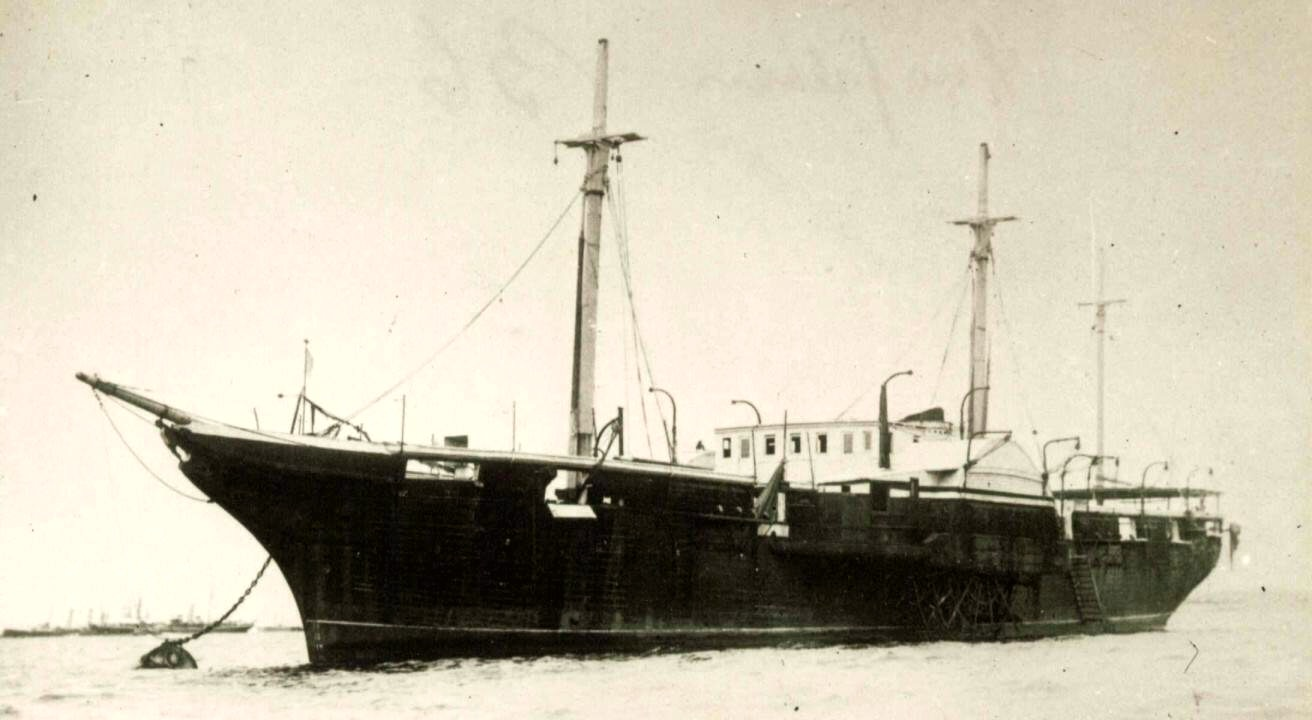
- Amazonas frigate, c. 1863

History

Empire of Brazil
- Name: Amazonas
- Namesake: Amazon River
- Builder: Thomas Wilson Sons & Co.
- Cost: £41,061
- Launched: 25 August 1851
- Completed: 7 April 1852
- Decommissioned: 1897
- Fate: Sunk

General characteristics
- Type: Paddle frigate
- Displacement: 1,800 metric tons (1,800 long tons)
- Length: 56.88 m (186 ft 7 in)
- Beam: 9.81 m (32 ft 2 in)
- Draft: 4.45 m (14.6 ft)
- Installed power: 350 ihp (260 kW)
- Propulsion: Mixed steam-sail, brig-barque rigging; 1 steam engine coupled to lateral propulsion wheels.
- Sail plan: Brig-rigged
- Speed: 11 miles per hour (9.6 kn)
- Complement: 200 officers and sailors in times of war
- Armament: 4 × smoothbore 68-pounder guns in battery; 2 × smoothbore 68-pounder swivel guns

The steam frigate Amazonas was a frigate-type warship that served in the Imperial Brazilian Navy and, for a short period, in the Brazilian Navy after the Proclamation of the Republic in 1889. The frigate was built in the Thomas Wilson Sons & Co. shipyards in Birkenhead and Liverpool, England; it was launched in August 1851. The purchase of this vessel was part of an effort by the Empire of Brazil to obtain more modern ships, due to the country's lag with some foreign powers. Amazonas was commissioned in 1852.

During the naval expedition to Asunción in 1854, the frigate was responsible for acting as the flagship of the fleet and taking a document with demands from the imperial government to the Paraguayan government on border issues involving the region of what is now the state of Mato Grosso do Sul. In the initial route, within Paraguayan territory, the vessel ran aground due to its large size and had to be towed back by Paraguayan ships. It escorted the ship that took the Brazilian imperial family on trips to the northeast of the country and the province of Espírito Santo, between 1859 and early 1860, with the purpose of strengthening the monarchy among Brazilian citizens.

By the end of 1863, Amazonas was part of the imperial fleet sent to the Amazon River in order to intercept two Peruvian warships, Morona and Pastaza, which were sailing on the Amazon River without permission. In mid-1864, it composed the Brazilian squadron in the Saraiva Mission, which aimed to force the Uruguayan government to pay reparations to Brazilians residing in Uruguay and who were being mistreated. It participated as a flagship in combat actions against Uruguayan ships and the naval blockade during the Uruguayan War.

On 11 June 1865, during the Paraguayan War, it had a distinguished role in the Battle of Riachuelo, where it single-handedly rammed four Paraguayan vessels and changed the fate of the combat, which, until then, was having a favorable result for the Paraguayans. Amazonas participated in naval actions in the Battle of Paso de Mercedes and Paso de Cuevas. Afterwards, it underwent several periods of repair between 1867 and 1869. At the end of the war, it was moored in Montevideo. In 1884 the vessel was designated as instruction ship of the Practical School of Artillery and Torpedoes. During the Armada Revolt, in 1893, it was seized by the rebels who ran it aground near the Ilha das Enxadas, Rio de Janeiro, and remained there until it was hit by a naval mine, which destroyed it, in 1897.

== Characteristics ==
Amazonas was built in England, at Thomas Wilson's (Thomas Wilson Sons and Company) shipyards in Birkenhead and Liverpool, at a cost of £41,061. The purchase of the ship, and others, was due to Brazil's need to compensate for its technological backwardness regarding nations such as France, England and the Ottoman Empire, which shortly after were fighting in the Crimean War and demonstrated the great technological superiority of their ships compared to those of other nations.

It was named Amazonas, the fourth vessel to bear this name, in honor of the Amazon River and the province of Amazonas, on 21 August 1851, and was initially masted as a brig-barque. On the 25th, it was launched into the sea, and, on 7 April 1852, it went through an armament exhibition, when it received the badge number 62. Amazonas displaced 1,800 tons, measured 56.88 meters in length, 9.81 meters in beam and 4.45 meters in draft. It had a triple expansion engine built by the American company Benjamin Hick & Son, with 350 HP, which moved the two side wheels and propelled the vessel to about 11 miles per hour. It had the capacity to store 300 tons of coal and consume about 28 tons of it per day. The construction was under the supervision of vice admiral John Pascoe Grenfell.

In the ship's bow, a figure of an amazon was carved, in the form of an Amerindian woman who held a canoe oar in her right hand, a quiver on her shoulder and an adornment of feathers on her legs. At the stern, it had naval symbols, the coat of arms of the Empire of Brazil and other Brazilian flags. In both decorations, mahogany was used. Inside, there was a spacious chamber for the commander and eight cabins for the officers. At the bow were the cabins for low-ranking sailors, in addition to the infirmary, which had 12 berths. It stored 12 tanks of drinking water. Its armament consisted of four pieces of 68 caliber, in battery, with 90 quintal each, six feet and eight inches long, with the capacity to launch projectiles of 8 inches in diameter each; two swivel pieces of 68 caliber, 113 quintal in weight and 9 feet in length. The collars and bed bases were of iron. It had two rowing boats and five longboats. It also had the capacity to garrison 200 sailors in times of war and 170 in times of peace. The first commander of the Amazonas was captain lieutenant Elisiário Antônio dos Santos, future admiral and Baron of Angra. The ship docked in Rio de Janeiro on 2 June 1852.

== History ==
=== 1852–1855 ===
After embarking in Rio de Janeiro, Amazonas departed for Bahia, where it remained until mid-July of that year. On August 9, back in Rio de Janeiro, frigate captain Joaquim Raymundo de Lamare was appointed commander of the ship. Under his command, the warship returned to Bahia on the 15th of October, and on this voyage collided with the brig Sarah, which sank, resulting in damage to the upper end of Amazonas' bow. It entered Guanabara Bay on November 8. Between the end of 1852 and July 1853, the following officers assumed its command: captain lieutenant Achilles Lacombe, frigate captain Rafael Mendes de Moraes e Valle, captain-lieutenant Francisco Xavier de Alcântara and captain lieutenant Luiz da Gama Rosa. Under Rosa's command, the ship made several voyages from Rio de Janeiro to Montevideo, Uruguay, between 1853 and 1855.

==== Naval expedition to Asunción ====
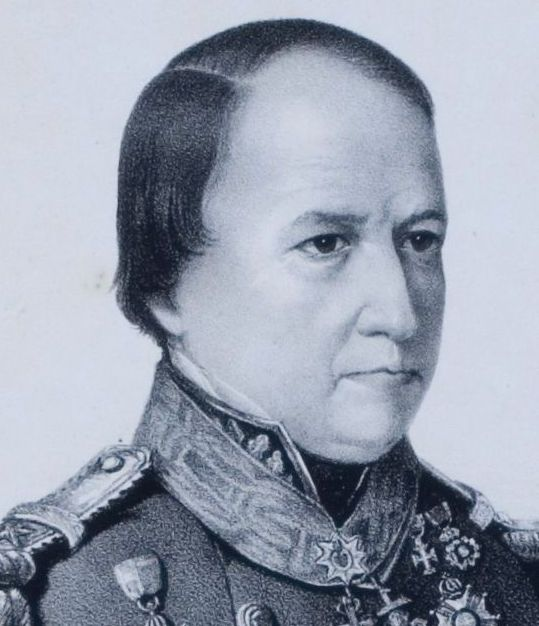
Pedro Ferreira de Oliveira. He commanded the Brazilian expedition to Asunción, and was aboard the frigate Amazonas

Years before the Paraguayan War, there were disputes between the Empire of Brazil and Argentina for hegemony in the La Plata Basin that also involved Paraguay. With Brazil, Paraguay had some negotiations over the free navigation of the Paraguay River and territorial limits in what is now Mato Grosso do Sul, a region that was claimed by both nations. This relationship was marked by tensions and mutual distrust, and reached a point of near war, which was only not materialized due to the imminence of the Platine War. However, in order to enforce the Brazil's right on border issues with Paraguay, emperor Pedro II sent documents on these issues to Paraguay, which arrived on 20 February 1855.

The expedition that took the documents had Amazonas as its flagship. The vessel and another 30 warships, armed with 150 cannons and about 3,000 soldiers, left Rio de Janeiro on 10 December 1854. The river section was too complicated for the heavy imperial ships, and they occasionally ran aground. Due to such difficulties, the fleet took 72 days to reach the border with Paraguay. (Note: For comparison, a voyage from Rio de Janeiro to the province of Mato Grosso, through the Paraguay River, which necessarily crossed Paraguayan territory, aboard a steamer suitable for river navigation, in the 19th century, took around 18 days.) The goal of this expedition was to carry out a display of force to the Paraguayan government, in an authentic gunboat diplomacy, so that it would accept the terms demanded in the documents. The mission was secret, but Paraguay had a large network of agents spread across Rio de Janeiro, São Borja and Encarnación who delivered news about imperial actions to Asunción. The Paraguayans got ahead in the preparations for the possible naval attack; evacuated the capital and increased the troops readiness.

When the imperial ships reached the border at Três Bocas, they encountered a Paraguayan force under the command of captain Pedro Ignacio Meza. Meza would allow the passage through Paraguayan territory as long as it was just one vessel. The commander of the Brazilian expedition, Pedro Ferreira de Oliveira, accepted and went up the Paraguay River aboard the Amazonas. During the journey, the Amazonas ran aground and had to be towed back by Paraguayan ships, and Oliveira had to sail to Assunción aboard the corvette Ipiranga, which docked on 24 March 1855. On April 3, talks began between the Brazilian commander and the then Minister of Foreign Affairs of Paraguay, Francisco Solano López. Negotiations lasted until 14 April and both agreed to open negotiations on border issues.

Among the main points was the territory of the Apa River, which neither side wanted to give up. The Empire of Brazil had to sign a peaceful agreement, because, according to historian Fabiano Barcellos Teixeira, it was not capable of going to war against Paraguay at that time. On April 24, Pedro Ferreira de Oliveira and Solano López signed a treaty of friendship, commerce and navigation, with 21 articles and an additional convention on borders, with five articles. Among its main provisions was the recognition of the full right of the Paraguayan government over the Paraguay River in the region where it crosses Paraguayan territory, and the border issue would be postponed for another year. However, when the fleet arrived in Rio de Janeiro with the treaty, it was not ratified by the Empire of Brazil, which insisted on the right to free navigation based on the alliance against Juan Manuel de Rosas of 1850, and completely rejected it. After the return, Amazonas went to Maranhão, on August 15, where it underwent repairs.

=== 1856–1864 ===
==== Commissions and voyage of the Imperial Family ====
Under the command of captain lieutenant José Segundino de Gomensoro, after its repairs, Amazonas set sail for Montevideo on 13 April 1856 and returned to Rio de Janeiro on May 6. On the 20th of June it sailed to Bahia and returned on the 16th of July. On October 13 it left for Pernambuco and returned on December 13. Under the notice of the 18th, captain lieutenant Francisco Edwiges Brício temporarily assumed command of the ship. On 28 May 1857, a group of its crew watched, aboard the brig Fidelidade, the execution by firing squad of a sailor who had murdered the guardian of the corvette Recife. By the notice of 8 August 1857, it was the turn of captain lieutenant Manoel Pedro dos Reis to assume command of Amazonas.

On the 21st of August, it left on a reserved commission and returned on the 29th; it set sail on 19 September for Montevideo and returned on 14 January 1858; it left for the same port again on the 24th, and returned on the 30th of July. By the notice of December 21 of that year, frigate captain Teotônio Raimundo de Brito assumed command. On 1 October 1859, emperor Pedro II, accompanied by empress Teresa Cristina and a small entourage, undertook a trip to the northern provinces of Brazil. This trip was necessary for the Brazilian monarchy to strengthen itself among the population, and it was also a way of preserving national unity by providing the reconstruction of political alliances, including with opponents of the emperor. They boarded the steamer Apa, which was escorted by the frigate Amazonas, the corvette Paraense and the gunboat Belmonte. They visited the Paulo Afonso Falls, in Bahia, and the provinces of Pernambuco, Paraíba, Alagoas and Sergipe. On January 26, on their way back, they landed in the province of Espírito Santo, where they remained until 12 February 1860. The departure from Vitória back to the court in Rio de Janeiro took place early in the morning of the next day, under the same escort – Apa, Amazonas, Paraense and Pirajá – heading towards the port of Guarapari.

==== Issues with Peru ====
In the 1850s and 1860s, Brazil and Peru were involved in two disputes: the free navigation of the Amazon River and the delimitation of the territorial boundaries of the two countries. On 22 October 1858, a River Convention was signed that gave Peruvian merchant ships the right of navigation on the Amazon River, but on some conditions, which stated that Peruvian authorities and captains of Peruvian ships had to always keep the Brazilian authorities informed of the movements of ships flying the Peruvian flag. However, such restrictions, together with disputes over the delimitation of borders, resulted in an incident involving two Peruvian warships that docked in the city of Belém in 1863.

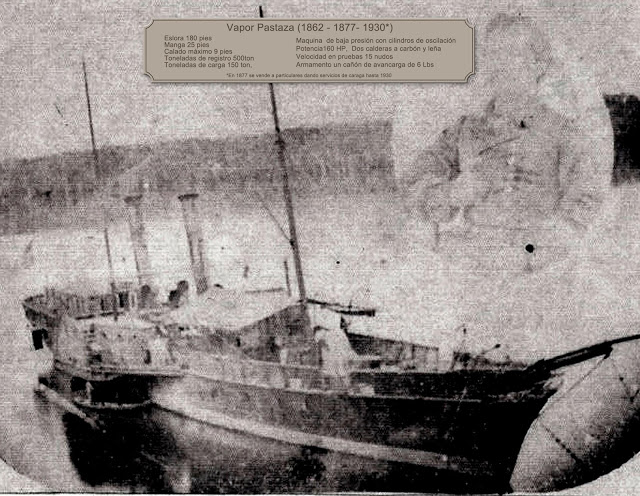
Steamer Pastaza, one of the Peruvian waships involved in the 1863 incident

This incident consisted of the following: the Peruvian warships Morona and Pastaza were docked in Belém, capital of the province of Pará, at the end of 1863. Its commanders then decided, after their stay in the city, to freely ascend the waters of the Amazon river towards Peru without giving any notice to the Brazilian authorities. They justified their action with the clauses of the River Convention of 1858. The president of the province of Pará tried to convince them that the convention only referred to merchant ships of both countries, duly registered and that it stipulated nothing about warships, even if loaded with goods (as was the case). However, the Morona, carrying goods, and accompanied by the Pastaza, departed from Belém without heeding the orders of the president of the province.

A few days later, not far from Belém, the two ships ran aground, having been ordered to return to the capital of Pará by the commander of the Brazilian steamer Belém, which had been chasing the Peruvian ships since their departure. However, as the Peruvians had managed to lift the ships, they ignored the orders and went on their course. Despite this, the steamer Pastaza had to return from the village of Breves to Belém due to lack of provisions and fuel. Upon arriving in Belém, its commander asked the president of the province permission for heading to Cayenne, which was granted. The Morona, on the other hand, did not return to Belém and, upon being ordered to stop its course by the garrison in the fort of Óbidos, fired against it and made its way up the river. When approaching Manaus, it ran aground once again, this time on the reefs of the district of Puraquequara, 33 km away from Manaus.

Informed of these events, the imperial government sent a naval division under the command of chief of squadron Guilherme Parker to Pará in order to assure the territorial sovereignty of the Empire from the offenses that had been inflicted on it. Parker received the following instructions: take the Peruvian steamers back to Belém to carry out their customs duties, or, had they already crossed the border, continue on to the Peruvian province of Loreto to demand reparations from the government of Peru for what happened. This naval division, made up of the ships Beberibe, Belmonte, Ipiranga and Parnaíba, arrived in Belém in mid-December 1863 and left on the 15th of that month towards the province of Amazonas, in pursuit of the Peruvian ships, with the frigate Amazonas joining the other squadron two days later. Before that, just when he arrived in Pará, Parker was informed that the steamer Pastaza had left for Cayenne, and that the Morona had been rescued by the authorities of the province of Amazonas, who prevented her from sinking after she ran aground. Upon reaching the said ship, Chief of Fleet Parker ordered that it be towed to Belém, having arrived in the city on December 31. At the beginning of 1864, the dispute involving the two Peruvian ships was resolved diplomatically, with Brazil demanding recognition by the Peruvian government of the irregular behavior of the captain of the Morona, and the payment of a fine to customs, which was done.

==== Saraiva Mission ====
On 20 April 1864, Amazonas was part of the fleet in the so-called "Saraiva Mission". The goal of this mission, under the responsibility of minister José Antônio Saraiva, was to force the Uruguayan government to pay reparations to Brazilians who were being mistreated in the country:

"[To defend the] life, honour and property of a large number of Brazilian citizens residing in the Oriental Republic, which were being and are being vilified for acts that constituted a ghastly picture of atrocious and barbaric crimes, so repeatedly committed there since 1851, not to go back to more distant times".

Besides the Amazonas, the fleet consisted of the corvettes Belmonte, Beberibe, Jequitinhonha, Niterói and Parnaíba; by the gunboats Mearim, Araguaia, Ivaí, Itajaí and Maracanã and by the steamer Recife. The fleet arrived on the 6th of May and easily dominated the bay of Montevideo, given that the Uruguayan naval power was almost nil.

=== Uruguayan war ===
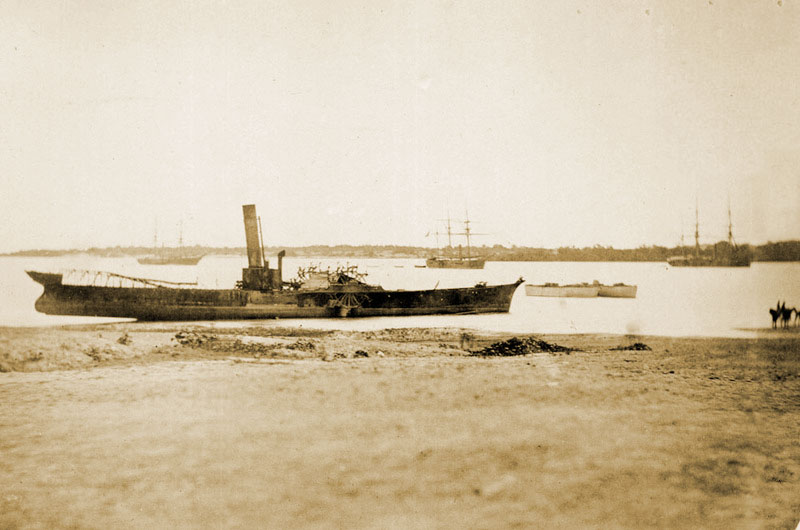
Steamer Villa del Salto. It was one of the only Uruguayan warships that confronted the Brazilian squad led by the Amazonas frigate during the Uruguayan War

After the Uruguayan government refused the imperial ultimatum to safeguard Brazilian interests in the country, minister Saraiva authorized admiral Joaquim Marques Lisboa, commander-in-chief of Brazilian naval and land forces in Uruguay, to begin retaliatory operations. The naval fleet, already stationed in Uruguayan waters in August 1864, was made up of the Amazonas, as flagship, six corvettes and five gunboats. With the mission of protecting Brazilian nationals, the fleet was dispatched to the cities of Salto, Paysandú and Maldonado on the 11th. To confront the Brazilian fleet, Uruguay had only two small war steamers: Villa del Salto and General Artigas. Both vessels were parked at docks when the Brazilian commander ordered the ships to remain where they were. Only General Artigas complied, however, the Uruguayans managed to sell the vessel before it fell into Brazilian hands.

The steamer Villa del Salto escaped and was only sighted on August 24 by two corvettes and a gunboat, while carrying troops to fight the Colorados. These vessels fired on the Uruguayan steamer to stop it, but it ignored the shots and a demand to surrender. It was only on September 7, while trying to flee to Argentina, that Villa del Salto was neutralized. It ran aground in Paysandú and was set on fire by its crew to avoid being captured by the Brazilians. From then on, the imperial fleet acted together with Brazilian land forces, in addition to blocking the cities of Salto and Paysandú.

=== Paraguayan war ===
==== Corrientes and the Battle of Riachuelo ====
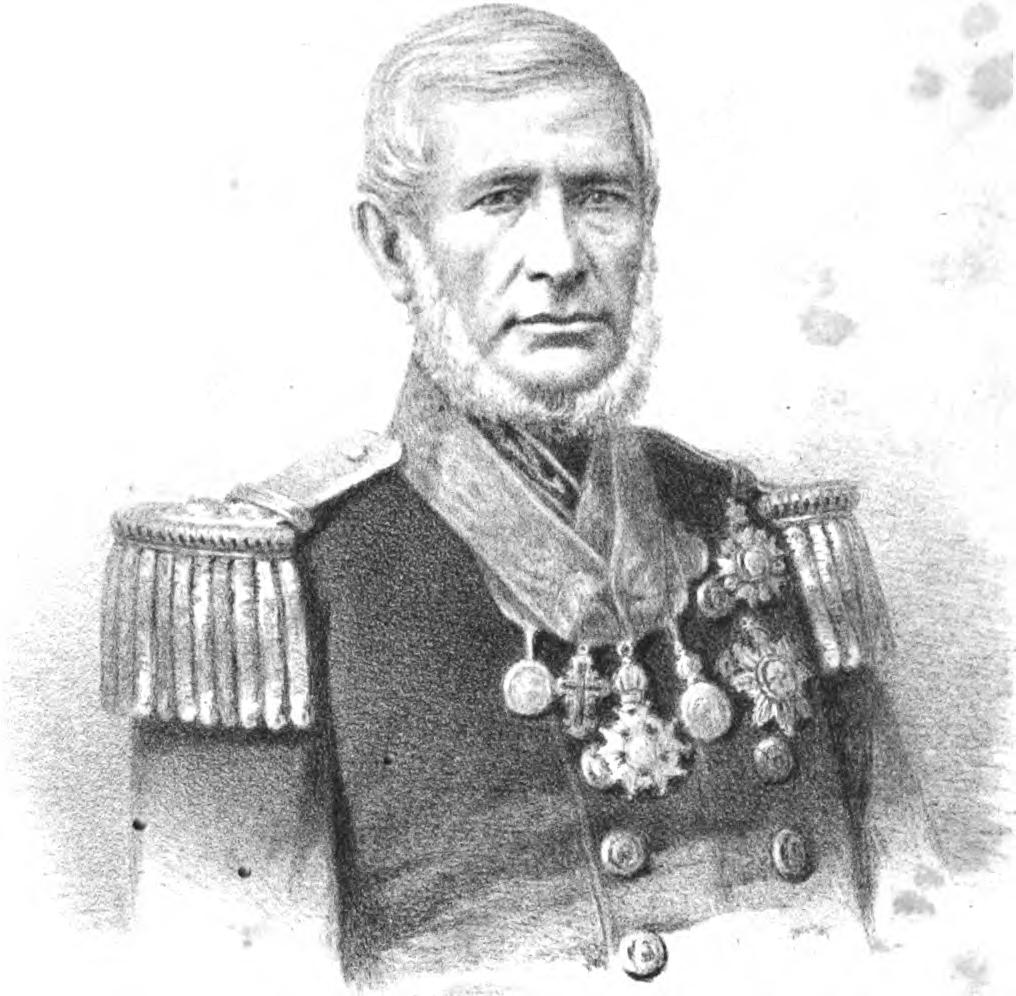
Manuel Barroso. Aboard the frigate Amazonas he led the Brazilian fleet in the Battle of Riachuelo

On 27 April 1865, in the midst of the Paraguayan War, the Brazilian naval force, based in Montevideo, constituted by the Amazonas, which took on board the 9th Infantry Brigade of lieutenant colonel José da Silva Guimarães, the Paraíba and Ivaí, was authorized to depart for Buenos Aires, after operations with naval and land forces against Paraguay had been authorized by the 2nd Viscount of Caramuru, Minister of War, and at the request of admiral Joaquim Marques Lisboa. On the 28th, already in the Argentine capital, Amazonas left for the Paraná River in order to join the 3rd Division of the Imperial Fleet, under the command of Sea and War Captain José Segundino de Gomensoro, made up of the corvettes Jequitinhonha, which was flying its ensign, Beberibe and Belmonte, and the gunboats Araguari, Iguatemi, Ipiranga, Itajaí, Mearim and the transport ship Peperiguaçu. The two fleets met in the Argentine city of Bella Vista.

On the 24th of May, the fleet departed from Bella Vista and headed for Rincón de Soto, an anchorage near the city of Goya, where Brazilian admiral Manuel Barroso and the Argentine general Venceslau Paunero discussed the operation to retake Corrientes, which had been invaded by the Paraguayans since April 14. The attack on Corrientes took place on 25 May, with the landing of Brazilian and Argentine troops, which were victorious. This attack demonstrated to the Paraguayans the vulnerability of their flank to the projection of Brazilian naval power against their army column, which was advancing through Argentina towards southern Brazil. For the Paraguayans, it was imperative to destroy this fleet in order to ensure dominance in the region of Corrientes and Entre Ríos.

Paraguayan president Francisco Solano López prepared an organized naval and land attack force. The Paraguayan fleet was under the command of frigate captain Pedro Ignacio Meza and consisted of the steamers Tacuary, Paraguary, Igurey, Jejuy, Ypora, Salto Oriental, Río Blanco, Pirabebe, the steamer Marquês de Olinda, a Brazilian vessel that had been captured by the Paraguayans on 12 November 1864, and six more artillery barges, called chatas, with a total of 47 cannons of varied calibers and 2,500 soldiers on board. On land, under the command of colonel José María Bruguez, there was an artillery battery composed of 22 cannons from 6 to 32 pounds and two batteries of Congreve rockets, strategically positioned close to Riachuelo, in addition to a force of 2,000 infantry between Riachuelo and Santa Catarina, and a large number of snipers and cavalry forces, under the command of general Venceslao Robles. Captain Meza's orders were to go down the Paraná River, bordering the coast of Corrientes, at dawn on June 11, and park the six barges on the banks of the Riachuelo; then, at daybreak, the fleet of steamers should look for the Brazilian ships to quickly board and capture them. If they were not successful, their duty was to return fighting down the river and rely on Riachuelo's batteries and on the artillery of the barges, attracting the Brazilians to the fire from these hidden positions. The plan did not come to fruition due to the Río Blanco running aground and the delay in pulling it ashore, thus losing the surprise element.

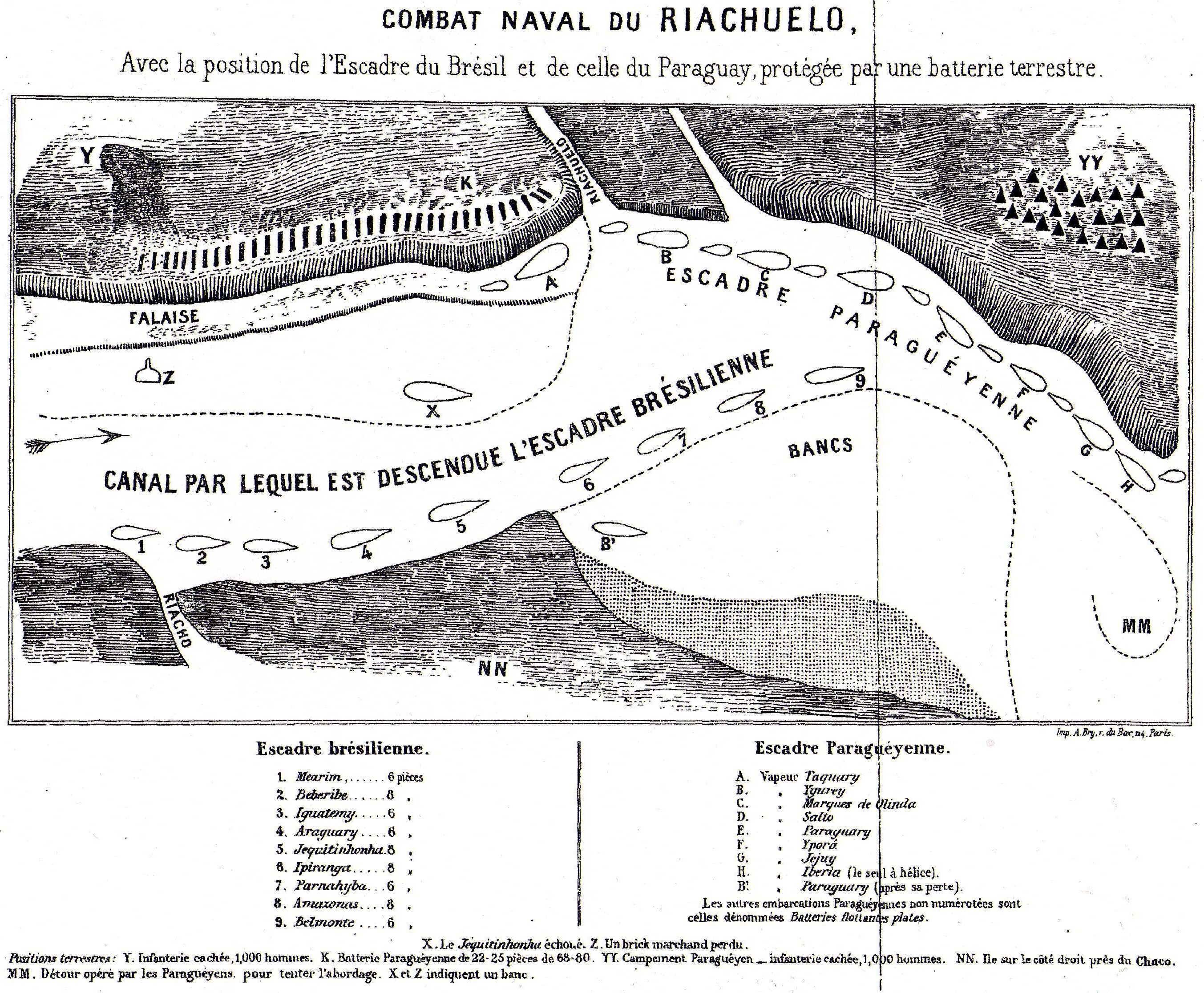
Scheme of the Battle of Riachuelo. The frigate Amazonas is represented by the number 8

The Brazilian Naval Force was led by admiral Francisco Manuel Barroso and consisted of the 2nd Division, formed by the warships Amazonas, Parnaíba, Iguatemi, Araguari and Mearim, and the 3rd Division, commanded by the Captain of Sea and War José Secundino de Gomensoro, and consisting of the Jequitinhonha, Beberibe, Belmonte and Ipiranga. At the time of the battle, the Amazonas was armed with 6 cannons; its commander was frigate captain Teotônio de Brito; first officer captain lieutenant Delfim de Carvalho; crew: 462 men, 149 of which were soldiers (including chief Manuel Barroso and 14 officers); and 313 army soldiers (including the commander of the 9th Brigade, colonel Bruce, and 9 officers), composed of the General Staff and the 3rd, 4th and 5th Companies of the 9th Line Battalion and the 4th Company of the 12th Volunteer Corps (former Police Corps of the province of Rio de Janeiro).

At 9:25 am, the naval battle of Riachuelo began, when the Paraguayan artillery fired the first shots. Meza's naval force advanced in column through the Brazilian fleet, still immobilized. At the beginning of the battle, there were many Brazilian sailors on land looking for firewood to save the coal stock. Admiral Barroso, who was aboard the Mearim, gave the signal for the squadron to begin combat. Meza's fleet took aim and, aboard the last ship of the column, the Tacuary, he gave the order to violently board, without hesitation, one or more Brazilian ships. Only at 10:50 am the Brazilian squad started the movement with Beberibe in the lead. Once on board the Amazonas, Barroso gave his famous signal: "Brazil expects each one to do their duty", after which the advance began with the Beberibe, Mearim, Araguari and the other ships. The next command followed: "hit the nearest enemy".

As the Paraguayan fleet passed, Barroso ordered the Amazonas to stop it, as he thought it was trying to escape, and advanced upriver. This maneuver was not well understood by some Brazilian commanders, and caused Jequitinhonha to pass in front of the Amazonas, and, in front the mouth of the Riachuelo stream where Bruguez's guns were located, to immediately come under fire by the Paraguayan batteries and, despite the crew responding with their artillery, the ship had to run aground on a nearby ravine to avoid sinking. Jequitinhonha was approached by three Paraguayan ships and, even at a disadvantage, managed to resist the successive attacks of the latter. The Paranaíba approached Jequitinhonha to save it, but was intercepted by three other ships from Meza: Salto, Paraguary and Tacuary, who boarded her with successive waves of men. The Paraguayan steamer Marquês de Olinda also approached the Paranaíba, with hundreds of boarding men armed with sabers, hatchets and pistols. Intense fighting ensued on the deck of the Brazilian ship, and after an hour of fighting, the ship was taken by the Paraguayan commander's forces and the rest of the Brazilian officers, supported by Mearim and Belmonte, were still firing at the Paraguayans.

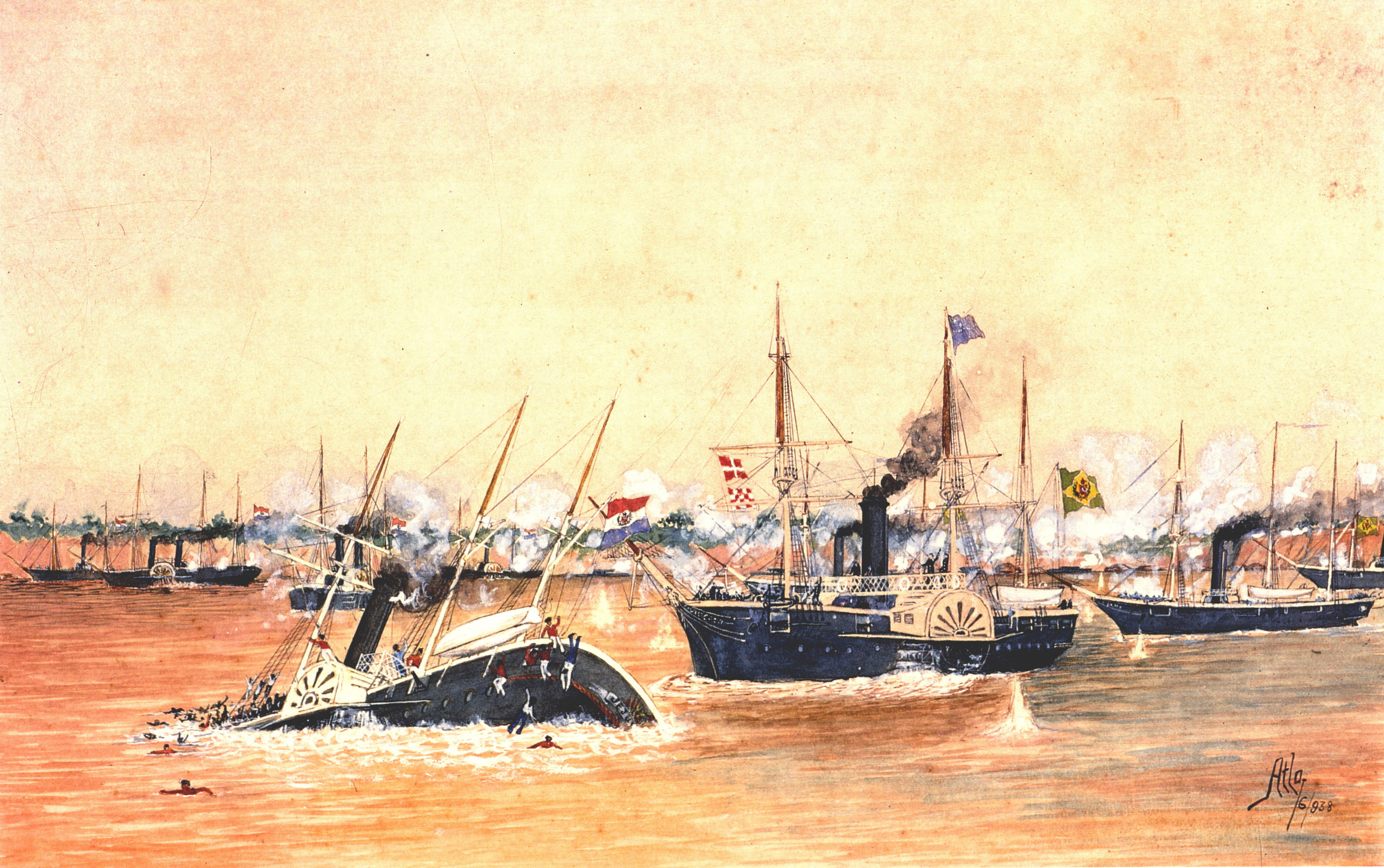
Depiction of the moment when the Amazonas puts down the Jejuy steamer

Up until that point, the battle appeared to have taken an unfavorable outcome for the Brazilians. Admiral Barroso saw the need to reorganize his forces and so he took over the leadership of the imperial ships aboard the Amazonas, where he signaled: “sustain the fire that victory is ours”, to strengthen the spirits of his crew. The Brazilian steamer led the ships that were still in navigational conditions, (Note: Out of the nine Brazilian ships that initially took part in the battle, six were still operational.) and headed to where the Paraguayan forces were located, in the Rincón de Lagraña, downstream of the mouth of the Riachuelo, where they suffered fire from Paraguayan guns and their batteries on land, but still managed to descend the river. About an hour later, the Brazilian fleet returned. Barroso decided to take advantage of the squadron's larger ships to ram the Paraguayan vessels. The Amazonas advanced towards the Paraguarí, which was put out of action. Soon after, it attacked the steamer Jejuy and set it down. Then it turned against the Marques de Olinda, who was also out of combat; to the Salto, rendering it useless, and, finally, sank a chata.

With the loss of more than half of its ships, in addition to the casualties of the squadron commanders, the Paraguayan naval force fled the battle, with only four vessels left. Some time later, some controversy arose about who was the author of the idea of using the Amazonas as a battering ram. For the Argentine press, colonel Bernadino Gustavino, who was aboard the aforementioned warship, would have advised this action. Barroso requested a justification council, which had reports from several witnesses, and this gave him a favorable result. Later, in 1877, Delfim Carlos de Carvalho, a witness of the battle, also questioned the argument that Barroso had the idea of ramming the Paraguayan ships. Barroso replied with a small book in which he reaffirmed that he had taken the initiative in the Amazonas maneuver. It is possible that Gustavino and Barroso could have had the same idea at the time of the battle.

==== Paso de Mercedes ====
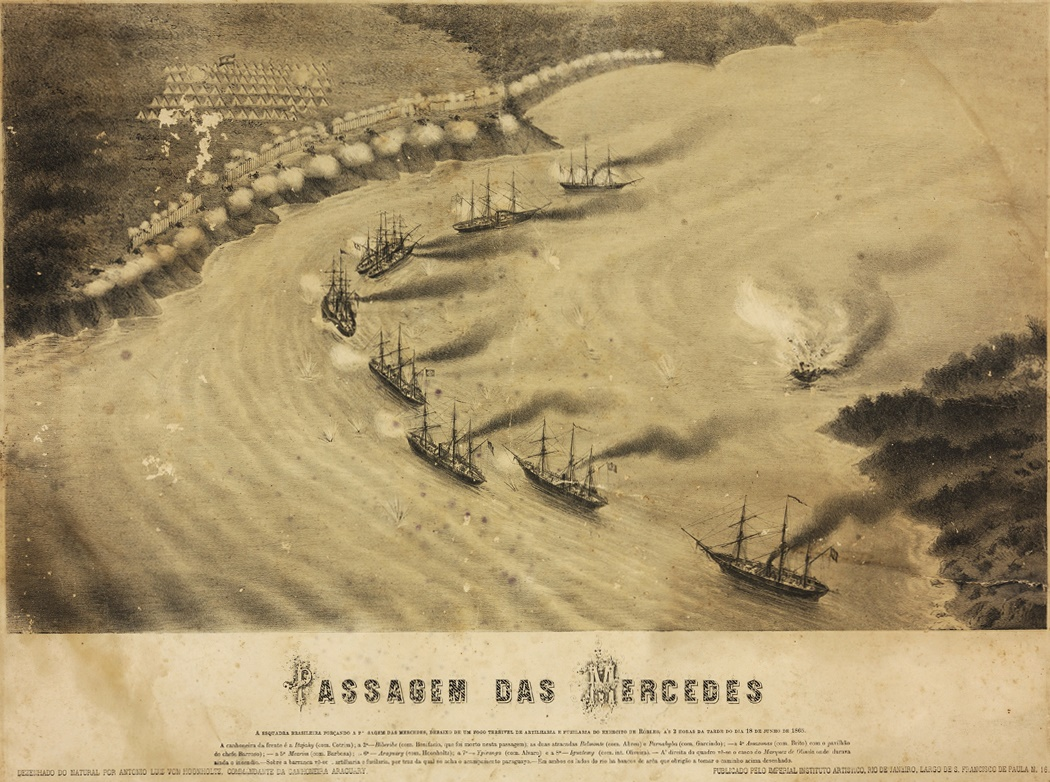
Brazilian fleet forcing the passage of Mercedes. In the lead is the steamer Avaí, followed by the Beberiebe; in the third position, side by side, are the Belmonte and the Parnaíba; in the fourth position the Amazonas

Two days after the naval battle of Riachuelo, the Brazilian fleet descended the Paraná River to the Cabral island in order to count the dead and wounded, carry out the necessary repairs and resupply with coal and ammunition. This last battle led Solano López to order ballistic tests with his cannons to verify that his artillery was capable to pierce the armor of the Brazilian vessels. The test revealed the possibility that his forces would not be able to prevent the imperial fleet from passing the defensive strongholds and reaching Asunción, and this made him uneasy. In order to solve this problem, general Robles organized an ambush for the fleet. The Paraguayan military sent a contingent close to the Riachuelo, the 36th Infantry Regiment with elements of the 2nd Horse Artillery Regiment, under the command of major Elizardo Aquino. To the south, about 34 kilometers from the first contingent, in the region of Punta Mercedes, close to the Argentine city of Empedrado, the second ambush position was established, with some artillery units from general Robles, under the command of general Roa.

On the morning of June 18, the imperial fleet sailed down the waters in a row, with the Amazonas in fourth position, totally oblivious to the Paraguayan preparations. At around 9 am, Bruguez ordered the attack of his 36-gun artillery on the enemy ships, which, taken by surprise, promptly responded with their own. The ravines from which the Paraguayans fired were high, and this made it easier for their projectiles to hit the ships, which could do nothing to avoid them, but the losses were restricted to a few soldiers who fired from the decks — about 14 dead and wounded — and little damage was done to the vessels. At eleven in the morning, the last ship of the fleet managed to pass. Barroso's disappointment at the surprise attacks inflicted by the Paraguayans was evident. The idea of losing a single ship to a handful of cannons and enemy soldiers was not conceivable to him. This would explain the lack of initiative that the Brazilian Imperial Navy had, from then on, in the war. At the end of the battle, the fleet's ships anchored at Chimboral, between Empedrado, to the north, and Bella Vista, to the south.

==== Paso de Cuevas ====
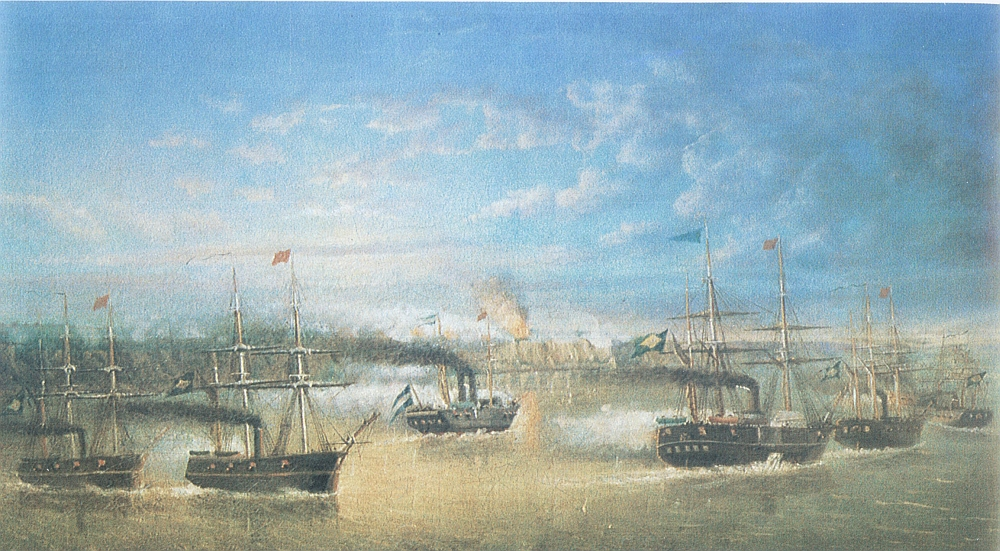
Allied fleet during the passage of Cuevas

General Robles had to reorganize his forces, due to the escape of the Brazilian fleet in Mercedes. He mobilized around 2,000 soldiers and 30 cannons to the ravines of Cuevas, located 23 kilometers downstream from Bella Vista, where the fleet was located. Due to the distance and the bad roads, the reallocation of men and military equipment was extremely difficult; it likely took up to 40 days to complete the preparations. José Ignacio Garmendia reported how the attack was organized:

"Colonel Bruguez divided his artillery into several batteries, forming layers of several platforms, or rather, battery esplanades that could harass the passage of imperial ships from above or below. On the first, on the waterline, there were four cannons; on the second, in a slightly higher position, 14 cannons; on the third and fourth, 12 large-caliber pieces, equidistant from each other, so that one could say very well that they were different esplanades; moreover, with the addition of the infantry's accurate fire and that of some congreve rockets, it was to be expected that, in the face of such organized positions, the imperial fleet would suffer great losses".

Once again, the details of the Paraguayan preparations were totally unknown to the allied naval high command, despite knowing that there were movements of these on the coast. Admiral Joaquim Marques Lisboa ordered Manuel Barroso to move the allied fleet, which in addition to the ships that participated in the passage of Mercedes, had included the Argentine steamer Guardia Nacional and the Brazilian transport ship Apa, under the ravines of Cuevas, on 10 August. They anchored on the same day at Turupí, to the north, near Cuevas. Along the way, the allied forces helped Argentine settlers on the Chaco coast who were in poverty, since all their properties were seized by the Paraguayans. On August 12, the fleet resumed its course in front of Cuevas and, as it approached the tip, Barroso sent two vessels to carry out reconnaissance of this position. So as not to be taken by surprise, as in Mercedes, Barroso put the fleet in maximum readiness and gave the order for passage.

At around 9:45 am, the allied fleet began the passage in the following order: the gunboats Ivaí and Itajaí, the corvette Beberibe with the insignia of the head of the third division; the gunboat Araguari, the frigate Amazonas, with Barroso's insignia, the gunboat Iguatemi; the corvette Parnaíba, the Argentine steamer Guardia Nacional; the transport Apa; the gunboat Mearim; the Belmonte corvette; the gunboat Magé, with the insignia of the head of the second division; and finally the gunboat Ipiranga. This fleet escorted several other smaller ships that carried all sorts of things, from soldiers and supplies to pack animals. The allied fleet forced the passage in an extended file about 2,000 meters from the Paraguayan attack position. Each vessel took about 20 minutes to cross, and each received no less than fifteen projectile hits on average; Amazonas claimed to have 40 perforations, and at least one reached the engine room. The Argentine vessel Guardia Nacional, perhaps in an attempt to prove its worth to the imperial ships, deliberately reduced its speed to spend more time fighting the enemies, and received most of the projectiles.

==== Last records during the war ====
In 1867, Amazonas returned from the conflict in Paraguay for repairs in Rio de Janeiro, where it docked on January 22 and remained until March 23. On April 25, it went through an armament display and, on August 27, lieutenant captain Joaquim Guilherme de Mello Carrão took over its command. On October 3, the frigate set sail for Montevideo, but the ship ran aground on the Flores Island parcel. It stayed for a while in the Uruguayan capital at the beginning of 1868. On March 14, Decree nº 4.117 of the executive power, determined that the Southern Cross ribbon be hoisted on the bow mast of the Amazonas frigate and of some other battleships, and in the center of the helm wheel the officer decoration of the same order. From April 20 on, the ship was anchored and underwent repairs, until 8 February 1869. On November 30, Artur Silveira da Mota, future admiral and Baron of Jaceguai, assumed command of the Amazonas until March 1870. Until the end of the Paraguayan War and the year, the Amazonas remained in Montevideo and acted as the flagship of the fleet stationed there.

=== Final years ===
Between 1874 and 1879, Amazonas went through complete armament and made trips to Montevideo and to the port of Florianópolis. The Order of the Day of 25 January 1884 determined that the frigate be designated as an instruction ship for the Practical School of Artillery and Torpedoes. In 1890, admiral Eduardo Wandenkolk listed the Amazonas for repairs in order to "preserve it as a glorious reminder of a historical fact". In 1893, the Armada Revolt broke out, and the Amazonas was seized by the rebels who used it against government ships. In this episode, the frigate ran aground west of Ilha das Enxadas and sank. Some of its components were saved, such as one of its masts, the figurehead, the wheel and other relics. In 1897, a mine near the sunken ship detonated and completely shattered it.

== See also ==
- List of historical ships of the Brazilian Navy
