= Uruguayan War =

1864–1865 war between Brazil and Uruguay

- Part of the Platine Wars
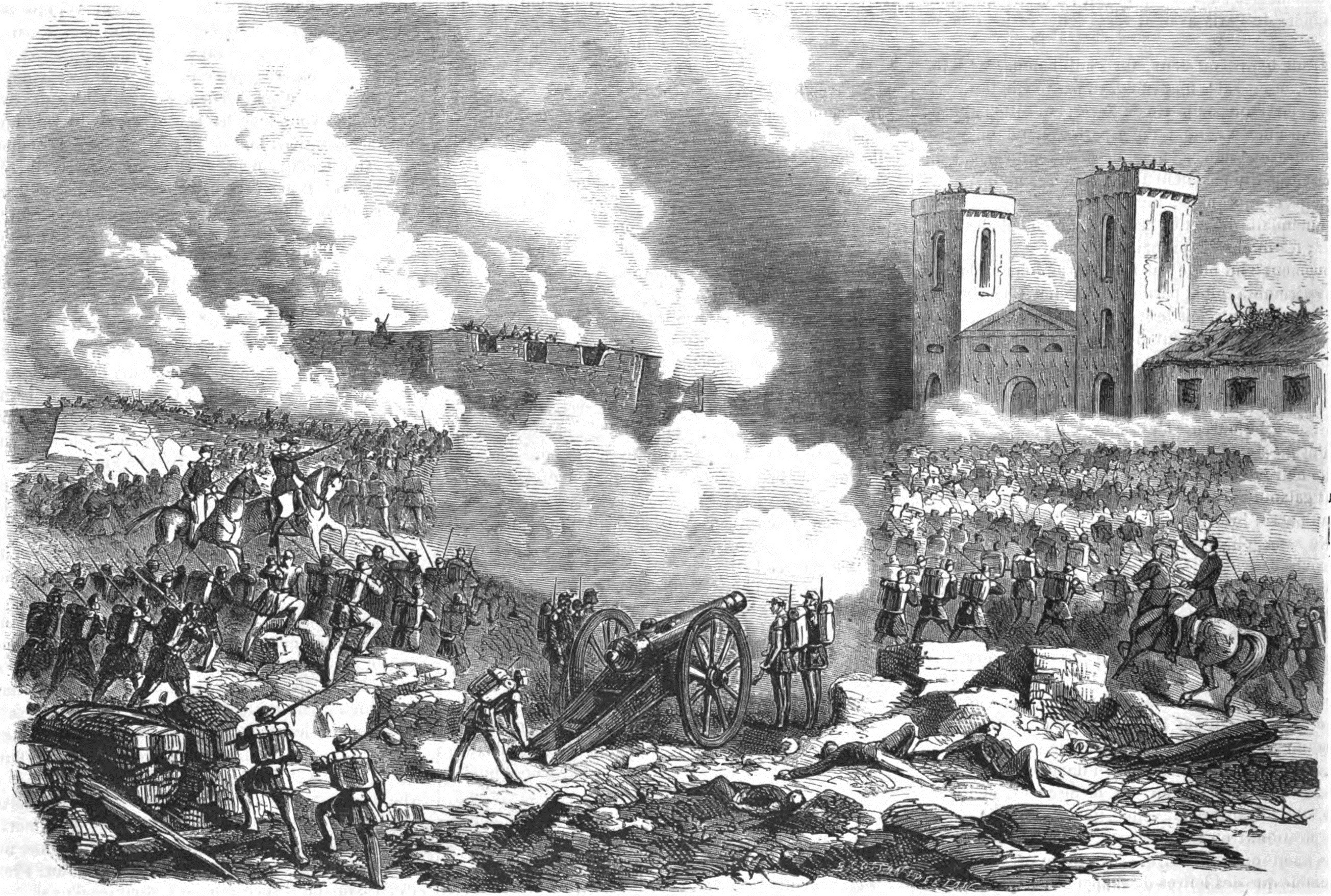
- The Siege of Paysandú as portrayed by L'Illustration newspaper, 1865
Date	10 August 1864 – 20 February 1865 (6 months, 1 week and 3 days)
Location	Uruguay; Empire of Brazil
Result	Brazilian–Colorado victory: Start of the Paraguayan War

Belligerents
Empire of Brazil; Colorados; Argentina; Unitarios	Uruguay; Blancos; Federales; Support: Paraguay

Commanders and leaders
Pedro II; Joaquim Lisboa; (Empire of Brazil) Joaquim Pinto; Manoel Vargas; Mena Barreto; Venancio Flores; Bartolomé Mitre	Bernardo Berro; Atanasio Aguirre; Leandro Gómez (executed); Timoteo Aparicio; Lucas Píriz †; Basilio Muñoz; Tristão Azambuja; José Palomeque

The Uruguayan War (Note: Spanish: Guerra del Uruguay; Portuguese: Guerra do Uruguai.) (10 August 1864 – 20 February 1865) was fought between Uruguay's governing Blanco Party and an alliance consisting of the Empire of Brazil and the Uruguayan Colorado Party, covertly supported by Argentina. Since its independence, Uruguay had been ravaged by intermittent struggles between the Colorado and Blanco factions, each attempting to seize and maintain power in turn. The Colorado leader Venancio Flores launched the Liberating Crusade in 1863, an insurrection aimed at toppling Bernardo Berro, who presided over a Colorado–Blanco coalition (fusionist) government. Flores was aided by Argentina, whose president Bartolomé Mitre provided him with supplies, Argentine volunteers and river transport for troops.

The fusionism movement collapsed as the Colorados abandoned the coalition to join Flores' ranks. The Uruguayan Civil War quickly escalated, developing into a crisis of international scope that destabilized the entire region. Even before the Colorado rebellion, the Blancos within fusionism had sought an alliance with Paraguayan dictator Francisco Solano López. Berro's now purely Blanco government also received support from Argentine federalists, who opposed Mitre and his Unitarians. The situation deteriorated as the Empire of Brazil was drawn into the conflict. Almost one fifth of the Uruguayan population were considered Brazilian. Some joined Flores' rebellion, spurred by discontent with Blanco government policies that they regarded as harmful to their interests. Brazil eventually decided to intervene in the Uruguayan affair to reestablish the security of its southern frontiers and its regional ascendancy.

In April 1864, Brazil sent Minister Plenipotentiary José Antônio Saraiva to negotiate with Atanasio Aguirre, who had succeeded Berro in Uruguay. Saraiva made an initial attempt to settle the dispute between Blancos and Colorados. Faced with Aguirre's intransigence regarding Flores' demands, the Brazilian diplomat abandoned the effort and sided with the Colorados. On 10 August 1864, after a Brazilian ultimatum was refused, Saraiva declared that Brazil's military would begin exacting reprisals. Brazil declined to acknowledge a formal state of war, and for most of its duration, the Uruguayan–Brazilian armed conflict was an undeclared war.

In a combined offensive against Blanco strongholds, the Brazilian–Colorado troops advanced through Uruguayan territory, taking one town after another. Eventually the Blancos were left isolated in Montevideo, the national capital. Faced with certain defeat, the Blanco government capitulated on 20 February 1865. The short-lived war would have been regarded as an outstanding success for Brazilian and Argentine interests, had Paraguayan intervention in support of the Blancos (with attacks upon Brazilian and Argentine provinces) not led to the long and costly Paraguayan War.

== Uruguayan Civil War ==
=== Blanco–Colorado strife ===
The Platine region in 1864. The shaded areas are disputed territories.

The Oriental Republic of Uruguay in South America had been, since its independence in 1828, troubled by strife between the Blanco Party and the Colorado Party. They were not political parties in the modern sense, but factions that engaged in internecine rebellion whenever the other dominated the government. The nation was deeply divided into Colorado and Blanco camps. These partisan groups formed in the 1830s and arose out of patron–client relationships fostered by local caudillos in the cities and countryside. Rather than a unity based upon common nationalistic sentiments, each had differing aims and loyalties informed by their respective, insular political frameworks.

Uruguay had a very low population density and a weak government. Ordinary citizens were compelled by circumstances to seek the protection of local caudillos—landlords who were either Colorados or Blancos and who used their workers, mostly gaucho horsemen, as private armies. The civil wars between the two factions were brutal. Harsh tactics produced ever-increasing alienation between the groups, and included seizure of land, confiscation of livestock and executions. The antagonism caused by atrocities, along with family loyalties and political ties, made reconciliation unthinkable. European immigrants, who came in great numbers during the latter half of the nineteenth century, were drawn into one party or the other; both parties had liberal and conservative wings, so the social and political views of newcomers could be reconciled with either. The feuding blocs impeded development of a broadly supported central national administration.

=== Liberating Crusade of 1863 ===
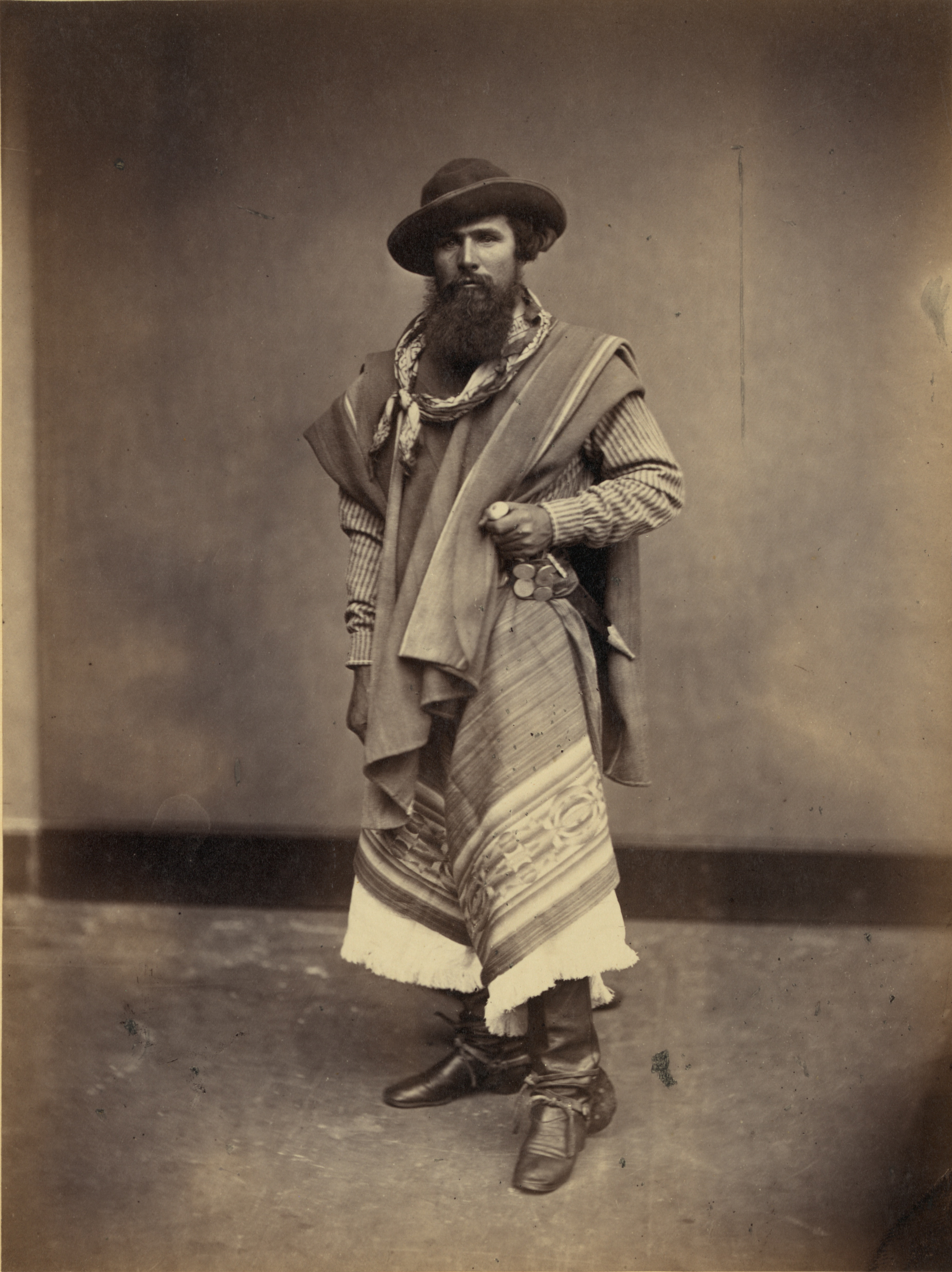
Gaucho horsemen were used as militiamen by caudillos of the Platine region

In the latter half of the 1850s, leading members of the Colorados and Blancos attempted a reconciliation. With the approval of many from both parties efforts were made to implement "fusionist" policies, which began to show results in cooperation in government and military spheres. The attempt at healing the schism was dealt a setback in 1858 when reactionaries in the Colorado Party rejected the scheme. The revolt was put down by Gabriel Pereira, a former Colorado and Uruguayan president under the fusionist government. The rebellious leaders were executed at Paso de Quinteros along the Río Negro, sparking renewed conflict. The Colorados suspected fusionism of promoting Blanco aims to their own detriment and called for the "martyrs of Quinteros" to be avenged.

With the internal weaknesses of fusionism now exposed, the Colorados moved to oust its supporters from the government. Their leader, Brigadier General Venancio Flores, a caudillo and an early proponent of fusionism, found himself without sufficient military resources to mount a sustained revolt and resorted to asking for intervention by Argentina.

Argentina was a fragmented nation (since the 1852 downfall of Argentine dictator Juan Manuel de Rosas), with the Argentine Confederation and the State of Buenos Aires each vying for supremacy. Flores approached the Buenos Aires Minister of War, Bartolomé Mitre, agreeing to throw the support of the Colorados behind Buenos Aires in exchange for subsequent Argentine assistance in their fight against the fusionist government in Montevideo (the Uruguayan capital). Flores and his Colorado units served Buenos Aires with fierce determination. They played a decisive role in the Battle of Pavón on 17 September 1861, in which the Confederation was defeated and all Argentina was reunited under the government in Buenos Aires.

In fulfillment of his commitment, Mitre arranged for the Colorado militia, Argentine volunteer units and supplies to be carried aboard Argentine vessels to Uruguay in May and June 1863. Ships of the Argentine navy kept Uruguayan gunships away from the operation. Back on his native soil, Flores called for the ouster of the constitutional government, by that time headed by Bernardo Berro. Flores accused the Montevideo government of Blanco sympathies and framed his "Liberating Crusade" (as he called his rebellion) in the familiar terms of a Colorado vs. Blanco struggle. Colorados from rural areas joined defectors from the military in responding to his call.

== International crisis ==
=== Paraguayan–Blanco ties ===
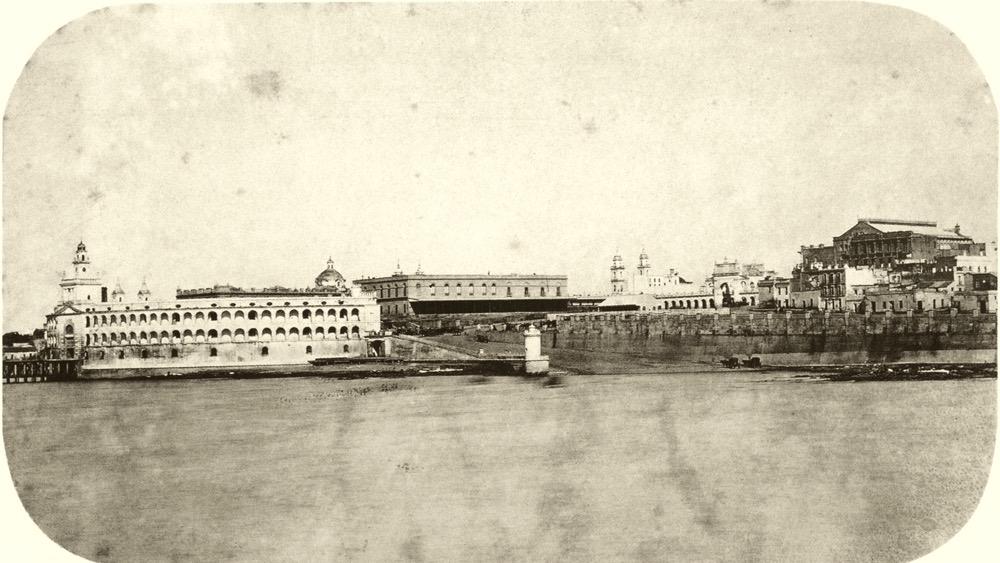
Buenos Aires, capital of Argentina, 1864

Although the Colorados had defected to the Flores insurgency, the national guard continued to support the fusionist government. Blanco partisans filled its depleted ranks. They also replaced army officers who had deserted to Flores. The Blancos received aid from several Argentine Federalists who joined their cause. As in Uruguay, Argentina had long been a battleground of rival parties, and Bartolomé Mitre's victory at Pavón in 1861 had signaled the triumph of his Unitarian Party over the Federal Party led by Justo José de Urquiza. Mitre denied any involvement in the Flores rebellion, even though his complicity was widely known and taken for granted.

Relations between Argentina and Uruguay worsened, and both nations came close to declaring war on each other, although neither could afford a direct military conflict. Argentina had only recently emerged from a long civil war, and was still struggling to suppress a Federalist rebellion in its western province of La Rioja. Uruguay was too weak militarily to engage in a fight unaided.

Since 1862, the Blancos had made repeated overtures to Paraguay, governed by dictator Carlos Antonio López, in an attempt to forge an alliance that might advance both their interests in the Platine region. Upon the death of López, his son, Francisco Solano López, succeeded him as Paraguayan dictator. Unlike the elder López, who strove to avoid encumbering alliances, Solano greeted the Blancos' proposal with enthusiasm. He believed Argentina was working towards the annexation of both Uruguay and Paraguay, with the goal of recreating the Viceroyalty of the Río de la Plata, the former Spanish colony that once encompassed the territories of all three nations. Solano López had, as far back as 1855, expressed this concern, commenting to the Uruguayan Andrés Lamas that "the idea of reconstructing [the old viceroyalty] is in the soul of the Argentines; and as a result, it isn't just Paraguay that needs to stand guard: your country, the Oriental Republic [of Uruguay], needs to get along with my own in order to prepare for any eventualities." In late 1863, Solano López was mobilizing his army and was in talks with Urquiza, the leader of the dissident Argentine Federalists, to convince him to join the proposed Paraguayan–Uruguayan alliance.

=== Brazil and the civil war ===
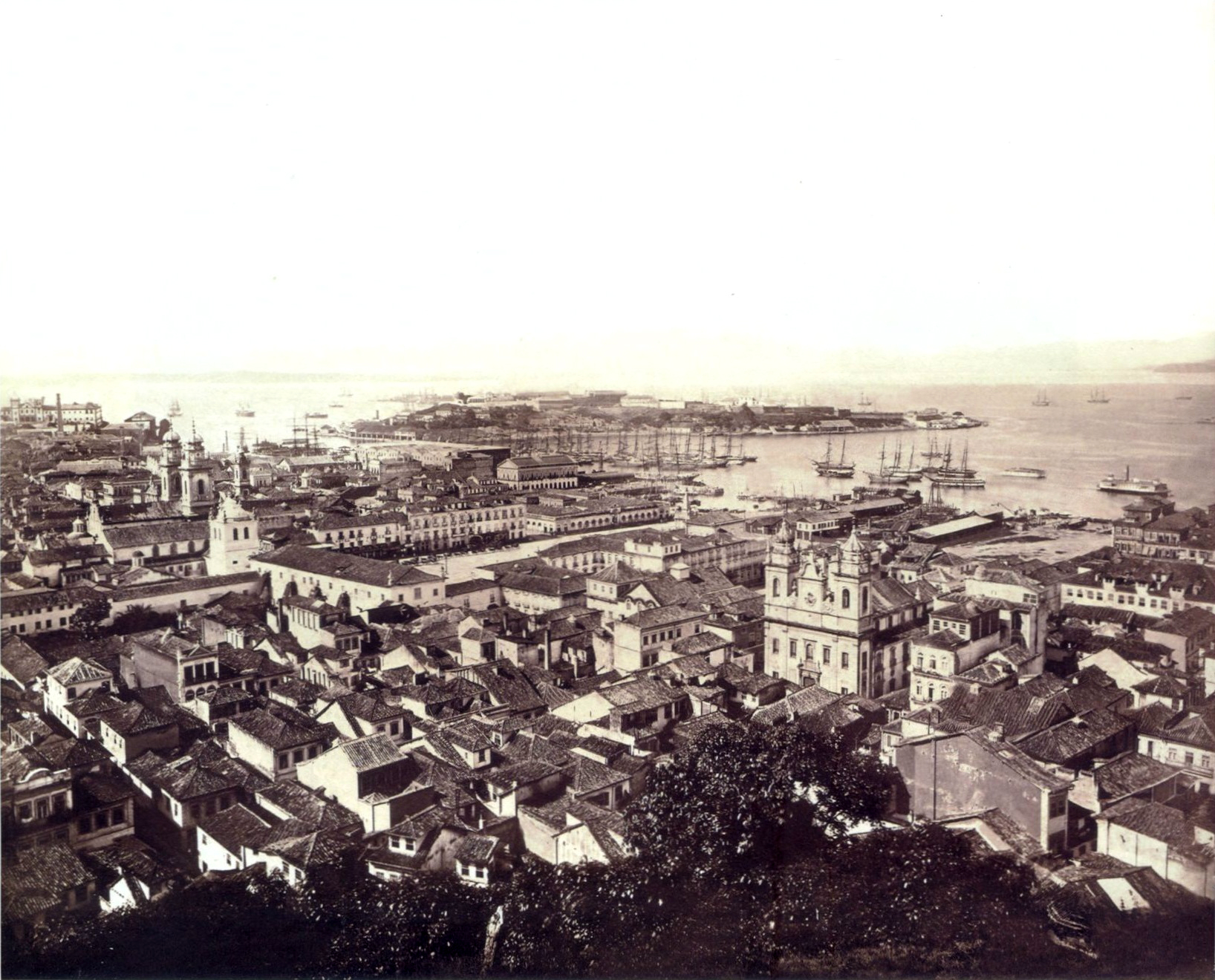
Rio de Janeiro, capital of the Empire of Brazil, c. 1865

The developments in Uruguay were closely watched by the Empire of Brazil, which had vital interests in the Río de la Plata Basin. After Rosas fell in 1852, Brazil became the dominant regional power. Its foreign policy included the covert underwriting of opposition parties in Uruguay and Argentina, preventing strong governments that might threaten Brazil's strategic position in the area. Brazilian banking and commercial firms also had ventures in the area, furthering ties within the region. In Uruguay, the bank run by Irineu Evangelista de Sousa (Baron and later Viscount of Mauá) became so heavily involved in commercial enterprises that the economy depended on this source of continued capital flow.

About 18 percent (40,000) of the Uruguayan population (220,000) spoke Portuguese and regarded themselves as Brazilian rather than Uruguayan. (Note: According to the 1860 census, there were 220,000 inhabitants in Uruguay. Of this number, 120,000 spoke Spanish and considered themselves Uruguayans. All the others were considered foreigners, including 18,000 Spanish, 10,000 Italians and 9,000 French. These were European immigrants who had arrived following Uruguayan independence in 1828. Descendants of intermarriages between Brazilian and other nationalities living in Uruguay were not counted among the 40,000 figure. The Uruguayan foreign minister, Juan José de Herrera, confirmed these numbers to Saraiva in 1864 (Golin 2004, pp. 194, 249).) Many within Flores' ranks were Brazilians, some hailing from the nearby Brazilian province of Rio Grande do Sul. Life along the frontier between Rio Grande do Sul and Uruguay was often chaotic, with hostilities erupting between partisans of various cattle barons, cattle-rustling and random killings. Large landowners on both sides of the border had long been antagonistic toward Berro's policies. The Uruguayan president attempted to tax the cattle coming from Rio Grande do Sul and to impose curbs on the use of Brazilian slaves within Uruguayan territory; slavery had been outlawed years before in Uruguay.

Among the Brazilian land barons were David Canabarro and Antônio de Sousa Neto, both allies of Flores and former separatist rebels during the Ragamuffin War that had ravaged Rio Grande do Sul from 1835 until 1845. Canabarro, a frontier military commander, misled Brazil's government by denying that Brazilians were crossing the border to join Flores. Sousa Neto went to the Brazilian capital to request immediate government intervention in Uruguay, claiming that Brazilians were being murdered and their ranches robbed. The "fact that Uruguayan citizens had just as valid claims against Brazil as Brazilians had against Uruguay was ignored", said historian Philip Raine. Although Sousa Neto had ties with the governing political party, his claims, including that he could amass a force of 40,000 to invade Uruguay, were not taken seriously by all. (Note: Luís Alves de Lima e Silva (Marquis and later Duke of Caxias) best illustrated the skepticism of, and opposition to, Neto when he bluntly responded that not even 1,000 men could be gathered, much less 40,000, to fight this war (Costa 1996, p. 133).) The Uruguayan crisis arrived at a difficult moment for Brazil, which was on the verge of a full-blown war with the British Empire for unrelated reasons. Brazil's government decided to intervene in Uruguay, fearful of showing any weakness in the face of an impending conflict with Britain, and believing that it would be better for the central government to take the lead rather than allow the Brazilian ranchers on the frontier to decide the course of events.

== Early engagements ==
=== Brazilian ultimatum ===
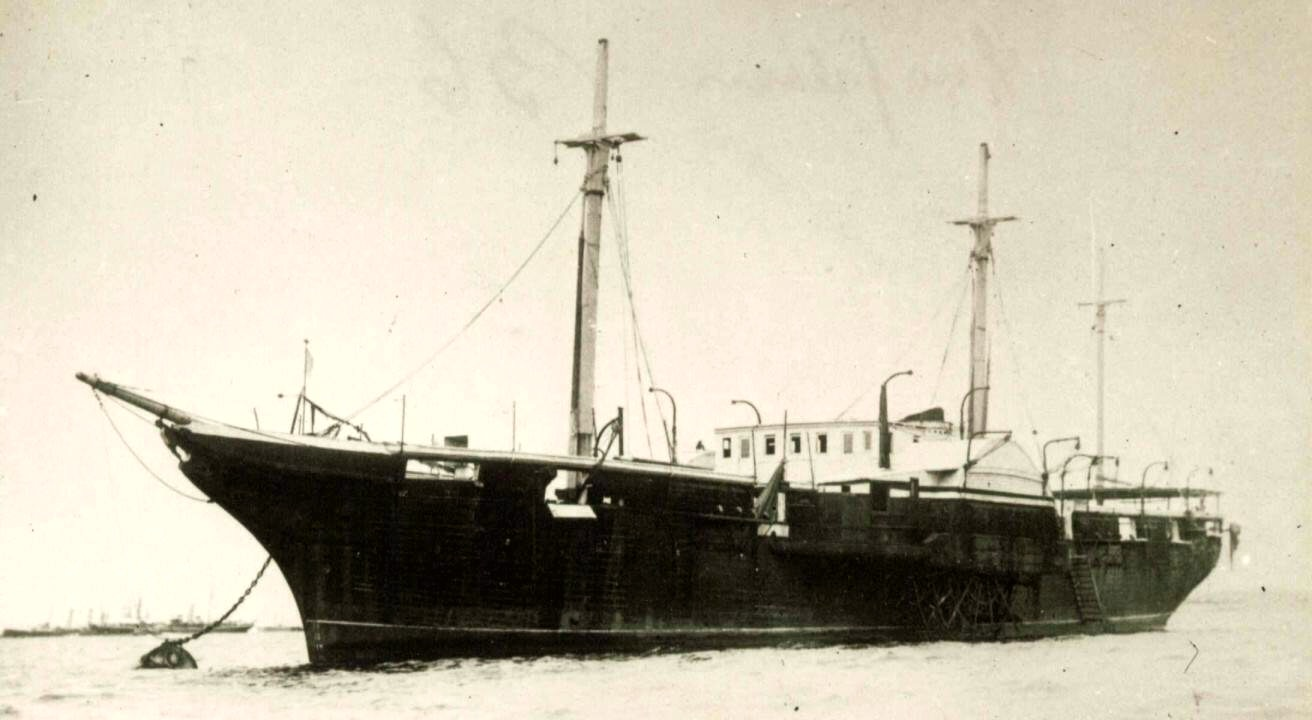
The steam frigate Amazonas served as part of the Brazilian naval fleet during the war.

On 1 March 1864, Berro's term of office ended. The ongoing civil war prevented elections; therefore Atanasio Aguirre, president of the Uruguayan senate and a member of the Amapolas (the radical wing of the Blanco Party) replaced Berro, on an interim basis. In April, José Antônio Saraiva was appointed minister plenipotentiary by the Brazilian government and charged with quickly reaching an accord that would settle Brazil's claims and ensure the safety of Brazilian citizens. His focus soon shifted from satisfying Brazil's terms to a more immediate goal of hammering out a deal between the antagonists in the civil war, with the expectation that only a more stable regime would be able to reach a settlement with Brazil.

The government in Montevideo was at first reluctant to consider Saraiva's proposals. With backing from Paraguay, it saw little advantage in negotiating a close to the civil war or in seeking to comply with Brazil's demands. The main factor, as historian Jeffrey D. Needell summarized, was that the "Uruguayan president had been unwilling to resolve these, particularly because the Brazilians whose grievances were at issue were allies of Venancio Flores, a client of the Argentines, and a man who was seeking his overthrow." A mutual enmity between Brazil and its Hispanic-American neighbors compounded the difficulties, the result of a long-standing distrust and rivalry between Spain and Portugal that had been carried over to their former American colonies. Brazil and Uruguay exhibited loathing for one another; as Robert Bontine Cunninghame Graham put it: "the Brazilians holding the Uruguayans as bloodthirsty savages, and the Uruguayans returning their contempt for the unwarlike ways of the Brazilians, whom they called monkeys, and looked down upon, for their mixed blood."

Eventually, in July 1864, Saraiva's persistent diplomacy moved the Uruguayan government to agree to mediated talks including Edward Thornton (the British resident minister in Buenos Aires), Argentine foreign minister Rufino de Elizalde and Saraiva himself. Initially, the negotiations seemed promising, but soon bogged down. On 4 August, convinced that the government in Montevideo was unwilling to work toward a settlement, a frustrated Saraiva delivered an ultimatum, which the Uruguayans rebuffed. On 10 August, Saraiva informed Aguirre that the Brazilian military commanders would receive orders to begin retaliation, marking the beginning of the war.

=== Alliance with rebel Colorados ===
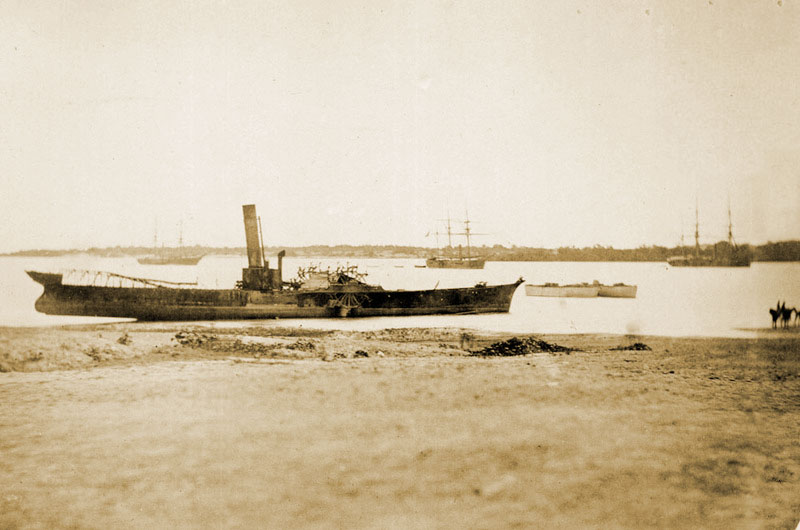
The Uruguayan steamship Villa del Salto after it ran aground and was set on fire by its crew

Under the orders of Vice-Admiral Joaquim Marques Lisboa (Baron of Tamandaré), a Brazilian fleet was stationed in Uruguayan territorial waters. The naval force comprised twelve steamships: one frigate, six corvettes and five gunboats. On 11 August 1864, Tamandaré, as the commander-in-chief of Brazilian naval and land forces in the war, received orders from Saraiva to begin retaliatory operations. Brazilian warships were deployed to the Uruguayan towns of Salto, Paysandú and Maldonado, ostensibly to "protect Brazilian subjects", while Uruguay's only warships, the small steamers Villa del Salto and General Artigas, were to be neutralized. When Tamandaré demanded these steamships remain at their docks, only the crew of General Artigas complied.

Tamandaré created a naval command assigned to Captain of Sea and War Francisco Pereira Pinto (later Baron of Ivinhema). Consisting of two corvettes and one gunboat, the division was sent to patrol the Uruguay River, a tributary of the Río de la Plata and part of the Platine region. On 24 August, Pereira Pinto sighted the Villa del Salto, which was conveying troops to fight the Colorados. The Villa del Salto ignored warning shots and a demand to surrender; after a desperate run from the Brazilian warships, it escaped to Argentine waters. This first skirmish of the war prompted the Uruguayan government to sever all diplomatic ties with Brazil on 30 August. On 7 September, Pereira Pinto again encountered the Villa del Salto sailing from Salto to Paysandú. The two Brazilian corvettes attacked the Uruguayan ship as it again tried to escape to Argentina. The battle ended when the Villa del Salto ran aground near Paysandú, where its crew set it on fire to prevent it falling into Brazilian hands. Meanwhile, the General Artigas had been sold to prevent its capture by the Brazilians.

To Flores, Brazil's military operations against the Blanco government represented a priceless opportunity, since he had been unable to achieve any lasting results during the rebellion. He entered talks with Saraiva, winning the Brazilian government over, after promising to settle their claims refused by the Blanco government. The Brazilian plenipotentiary minister gave instructions to Tamandaré to form a joint offensive with the Colorado leader and overthrow the Blancos. On 20 October, after a swift exchange of letters, Flores and the Brazilian vice-admiral formed a secret alliance.

== Colorado–Brazil joint offensive ==
=== Sieges of Uruguayan towns ===
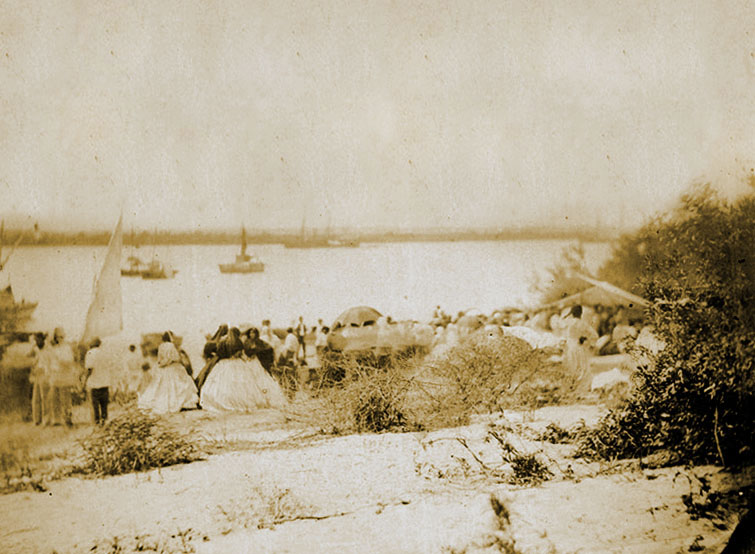
Civilians departing Paysandú during the siege, 1864

The Brazilian naval fleet in Uruguay was supposed to work in conjunction with a Brazilian land force. But months passed, and the "Army of the South" (called the "Division of Observation" until the ultimatum) stationed in Piraí Grande (in Rio Grande do Sul) was still not ready to cross into Uruguayan territory. Its main objectives were to occupy the Uruguayan towns of Paysandú, Salto and Melo; once taken, they were to be handed over to Flores and his Colorados.

On 12 October, a brigade led by Brigadier José Luís Mena Barreto detached from the main army. Two days later, near the Brazilian town of Jaguarão, the force invaded Uruguay's Cerro Largo Department. After skirmishes failed to halt their march, the Blancos abandoned Melo, and the brigade entered this capital of Cerro Largo unopposed, on 16 October. After handing over control of Melo to the Uruguayan Colorados, the Brazilians withdrew on 24 October, to rejoin their Army of the South. The next Brazilian target was Salto. Pereira Pinto sent two gunboats under First Lieutenant Joaquim José Pinto to blockade the town. On 24 November, Flores arrived with his troops and began the siege. Colonel José Palomeque, commander of the Uruguayan garrison, surrendered almost without firing a shot, on the afternoon of 28 November. Flores' army captured and incorporated four artillery pieces and 250 men; 300 Colorados and 150 Brazilians were left behind to occupy Salto.

Paysandú, the last Brazilian target, was already under blockade by Pereira Pinto. Tamandaré, who had been in Buenos Aires until this point, took charge of the blockade on 3 December. It was enforced by one corvette and four gunboats. Paysandú was garrisoned by 1,274 men and 15 cannons, under the command of Colonel Leandro Gómez. Flores, who had come from Salto, headed a force of 3,000 men, mostly cavalry. He invested Paysandú, deploying 800 infantrymen, 7 cannons (3 of which were rifled), and detachments of an additional 660 Brazilians. Gómez declined the offer to surrender. From 6 December until 8 December, the Brazilians and Colorados made attempts to storm the town, advancing through the streets, but were unable to take it. Tamandaré and Flores opted to wait for the arrival of the Army of the South. Meanwhile, Aguirre had sent General Juan Sáa with 3,000 men and four cannons to relieve the besieged town, forcing the Brazilians and Colorados to briefly lift the siege while dealing with this new threat. Sáa abandoned his advance before encountering the enemy force, and fled north of the Río Negro.

=== Army of the South in Paysandú ===
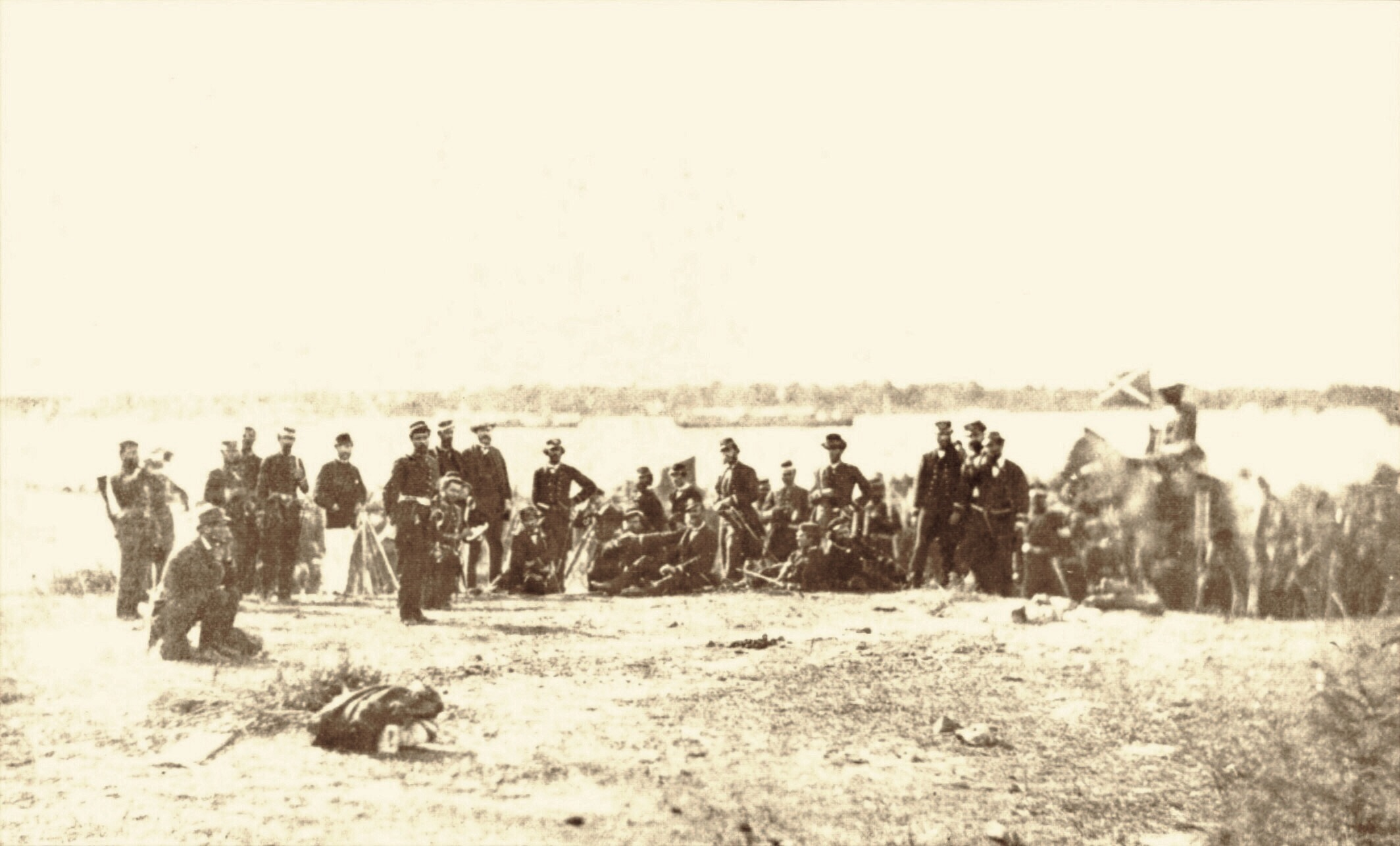
Brazilian navy and army troops during the siege of Paysandú, 1865

Rather than the show of force that had been intended by the Brazilian government, the war revealed the empire's lack of military readiness. The Army of the South, stationed in Piraí Grande, was commanded by Field Marshal João Propício Mena Barreto (later Baron of São Gabriel) with two divisions. The 1st Division, under Brigadier Manuel Luís Osório (later Marquis of Erval), was formed by regular army units. The 2nd Division, under Brigadier José Luís Mena Barreto (who had since returned from his attack on Melo), was composed entirely of national guardsmen. Altogether, it numbered only 5,711 men—all (except some officers) native to Rio Grande do Sul. (Note: The Empire did not rely upon general conscription, and only later mobilized additional units from other provinces. José Paranhos, Baron of Rio Branco, in his notes on Louis Schneider's work, and José Bernardino Bormann said that the Army of the South had 5,711 men (Schneider 2009, p. 63; Bormann 1907, p. 180). Gustavo Barroso and Augusto Tasso Fragoso gave round numbers: 5,700 and 6,000, respectively (Barroso 1935, p. 207; Tasso Fragoso 2009, Vol 1, p. 146).) The army was poorly equipped for siege operations: it brought along no engineers (who could direct the construction of trenches); it was under-equipped, lacking even hatchets (necessary to cut fences, break through doors and scale walls); and its 12 cannons (a mix of La Hitte and Paixhans) were of small calibers ill-suited to attacking fortifications.

On 1 December, almost four months after Saraiva presented the ultimatum, the Army of the South invaded Uruguay. Its troops were accompanied by a semi-independent militia unit, consisting of no more than 1,300 Brazilian gaucho cavalrymen, under the former Ragamuffin Antônio de Sousa Neto. The 7,011-strong force (with 200 supply carts) marched through Uruguayan territory unopposed, heading toward Paysandú in the southwest. The disorganized and undisciplined bands of gauchos, who formed the armies of both Blancos and Colorados, were no match for the Brazilian troops. The Uruguayan gauchos "had combat experience but no training and were poorly armed save for the usual muskets, boleadoras, and facón knives", remarked historian Thomas L. Whigham. "Fire arms he [the Uruguayan gaucho] rarely possessed", said Cunninghame Graham, "or if by chance he owned a pair of long brass-mounted pistols or a flintlock blunderbuss, they were in general out of order and unserviceable. Upon the other hand, a little training made him a formidable adversary with the sabre and the lance."

Field Marshal Barreto reached Paysandú on 29 December with two infantry brigades and one artillery regiment under Lieutenant Colonel Émile Louis Mallet (later Baron of Itapevi). The Army of the South's cavalry established its camp a few kilometers away. Meanwhile, Gómez beheaded forty Colorados and fifteen Brazilian prisoners and "hung their still-dripping heads above his trenches in full view of their compatriots". On 31 December, the Brazilians and Colorados recommenced their attack and overran the city's defenses, after a bitter struggle, on 2 January 1865. The Brazilians captured Gómez and handed him over to the Colorados. Colonel Gregorio "Goyo" Suárez shot Gómez and three of his officers. According to Whigham, "Suárez's actions were not really unexpected, as several members of his immediate family had fallen victim to Gómez's wrath against the Colorados."

== Blanco capitulation ==
=== Further operations ===
The route taken by the Army of the South during the war

On 12 November 1864, before the siege of Paysandú, the Paraguayan dictator Solano López seized the Brazilian steamer Marquês de Olinda, beginning the Paraguayan War. While the Army of the South crossed Uruguay heading toward Paysandú, Brazil's government sent José Maria da Silva Paranhos (later Viscount of Rio Branco) to replace Saraiva. He arrived in the Argentine capital of Buenos Aires on 2 December and a few days later sought a formal alliance with Mitre against the Blancos. The Argentine president refused, insisting that neither he nor his government had any role in Flores' rebellion, and that Argentina would remain neutral. On 26 December, the Paraguayans invaded the Brazilian province of Mato Grosso, laying waste to towns and the countryside.

As the situation deteriorated, the Brazilian government mobilized army units from other regions of the Empire. On 1 January 1865, one brigade (composed of two infantry battalions and one artillery battalion) with 1,700 men from the Brazilian province of Rio de Janeiro disembarked and occupied the Uruguayan town of Fray Bentos. Paranhos, along with Tamandaré, met Flores in Fray Bentos and decided to launch a combined attack against Montevideo. It was apparent that the Paraguayans would take too long to reach Uruguay and no help would come from Urquiza and his Argentine Federalists. Increasingly isolated, Aguirre hoped that the foreign powers could intervene, but when, on 11 January, he asked the diplomatic corps in Montevideo whether they would provide military assistance to him and his government, none responded positively. João Propício Mena Barreto sailed from Fray Bentos on 14 January with the Brazilian infantry, bound for a landing near the mouth of the Santa Lucía River near Montevideo. On the way, he occupied the Uruguayan town of Colonia del Sacramento, garrisoning it with 50 soldiers.

The cavalry and artillery were placed under Osório and went overland. They met João Propício Mena Barreto and the infantry at their landing place. From there, the reunited Army of the South marched on Montevideo. On 31 January, Brazil and the Colorados besieged the Uruguayan capital. In the meantime, on 19 January, Paranhos attempted to clarify the nature of the Brazilian operations against the Blancos. He issued notes to the foreign diplomatic corps in Buenos Aires declaring that a state of war existed between Brazil and Uruguay. Until then, there had been no formal declaration of war, and the Empire's military operations in Uruguay since August 1864 had been mere "reprisals"—the vague term used by Brazilian diplomacy since the ultimatum.

=== Armistice ===
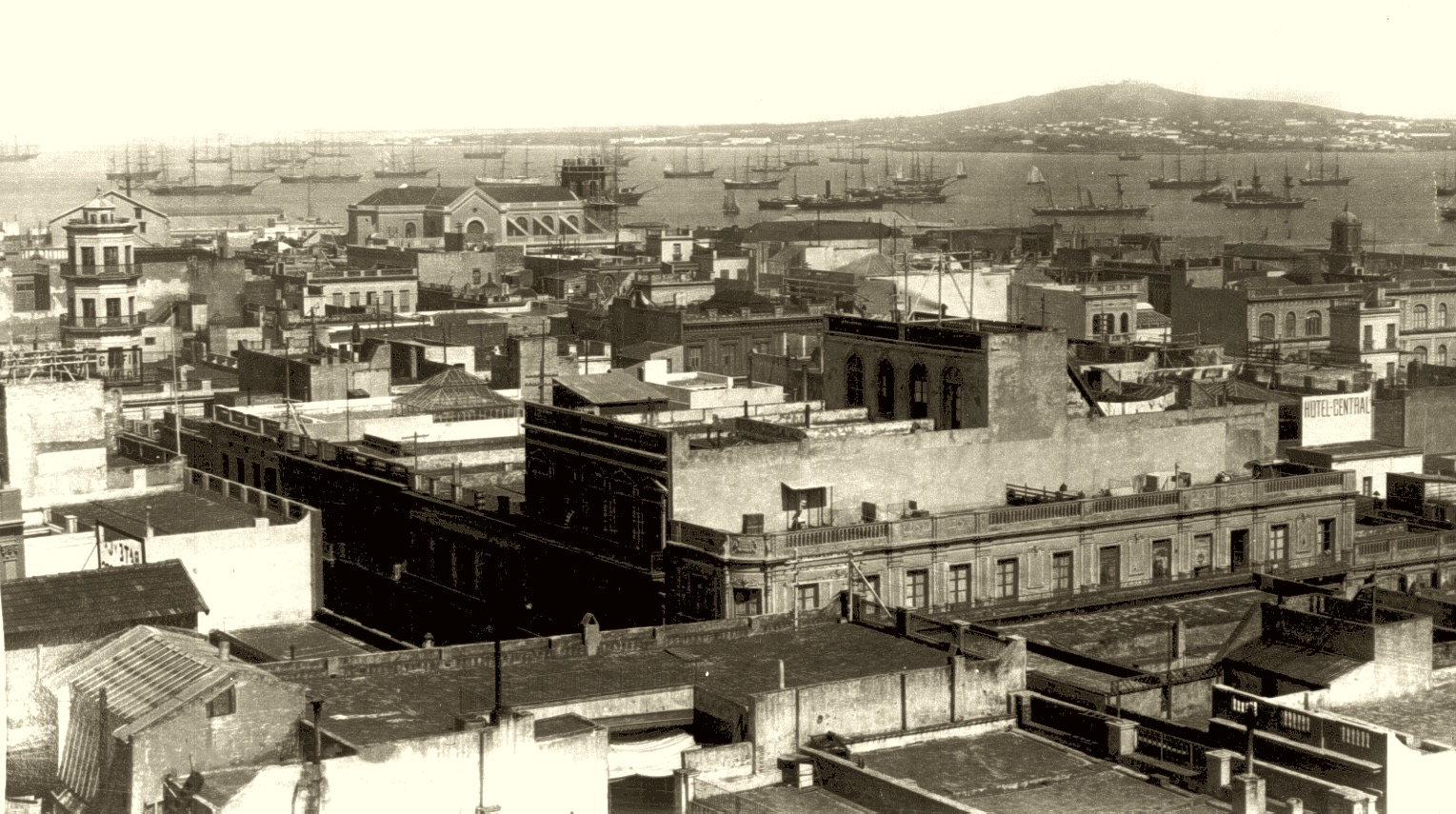
Montevideo, capital of Uruguay, 1865

In an attempt to divert the attention of Brazil from the siege of the capital, the Blanco government ordered the "Vanguard Army of the Republic of Uruguay", composed of 1,500 men under General Basilio Muñoz, to invade Brazilian soil. On 27 January 1865, Muñoz crossed the border and exchanged fire with 500 cavalrymen from Brazil's National Guard units. The Brazilians retreated to the town of Jaguarão, where they were joined by 90 infantrymen also from the National Guard, and hurriedly constructed trenches. There were also two small steamers and one other large vessel, each equipped with one artillery piece, to protect Jaguarão. The Blanco army attacked the town in the Battle of Jaguarão, but were repelled. Muñoz established a brief siege and asked Colonel Manuel Pereira Vargas (the commander of the Brazilian garrison) to surrender, but to no effect. In the early hours of 28 January, Muñoz retreated with his men toward Uruguay, ransacking property and taking all the slaves they could find. (Note: A few books claim that Muñoz's men raped Brazilian women during their retreat from Jaguarão (Tasso Fragoso 2009, Vol 1, pp. 246–247; Osório & Osório 1915, pp. 20–21). The sole contemporary source mentioning the rapes was an article in a gazette (Schneider 2009, p. 102). The attack on Jaguarão only became widely known following an official report submitted by the president (governor) of Rio Grande do Sul, in which there is no mention of violence toward Brazilian women, only of looting and the kidnapping of slaves.(Schneider 2009, pp. 88–89, 102; Golin 2004, pp. 304–305; Bormann 1907, pp. 210–215). It is known that one Brazilian (a former Ragamuffin officer) was castrated and had his ears cut off after he was killed, a common practice among gauchos (Bormann 1907, p. 215).)

On 2 February, Tamandaré declared to foreign diplomats that Montevideo was under siege and blockade. The Uruguayan capital was defended by between 3,500 and 4,000 armed men with little to no combat experience and 40 artillery pieces of various calibers. On 16 February, the Army of the South was further reinforced by 1,228 men from the 8th Battalion of Caçadores (Sharpshooters) arriving from the Brazilian province of Bahia, raising its numbers to 8,116. Sousa Neto and his gauchos had detached from the main force weeks before to pursue Muñoz and his army. British and French nationals were evacuated to Buenos Aires. The "general exodus of foreigners that followed caused those who remained in Montevideo to feel terror for the first time. All agreed that a full-scale assault against the city could not be postponed." However, neither Paranhos nor his government were willing to risk the destruction of Montevideo and face the inevitable outcry from other nations that would follow it.

On 15 February, Aguirre's term of office expired. Against the wishes of the Amapolas, the moderate Tomás Villalba was elected by the Senate to replace Aguirre. French, Italian and Spanish troops landed in Montevideo at Villalba's request to dissuade the radical Blancos from attempting a coup to retake power. Villalba entered into talks with Flores and Paranhos. With the Italian resident minister Raffaele Ulisse Barbolani serving as intermediary, an agreement was reached. Flores and Manuel Herrera y Obes (representing Villalba's government) signed a peace accord on 20 February at the Villa de la Unión. A general amnesty was granted to both Blancos and Colorados, and Villalba handed over the presidency to Flores on an interim basis until elections could be held.

== Aftermath ==
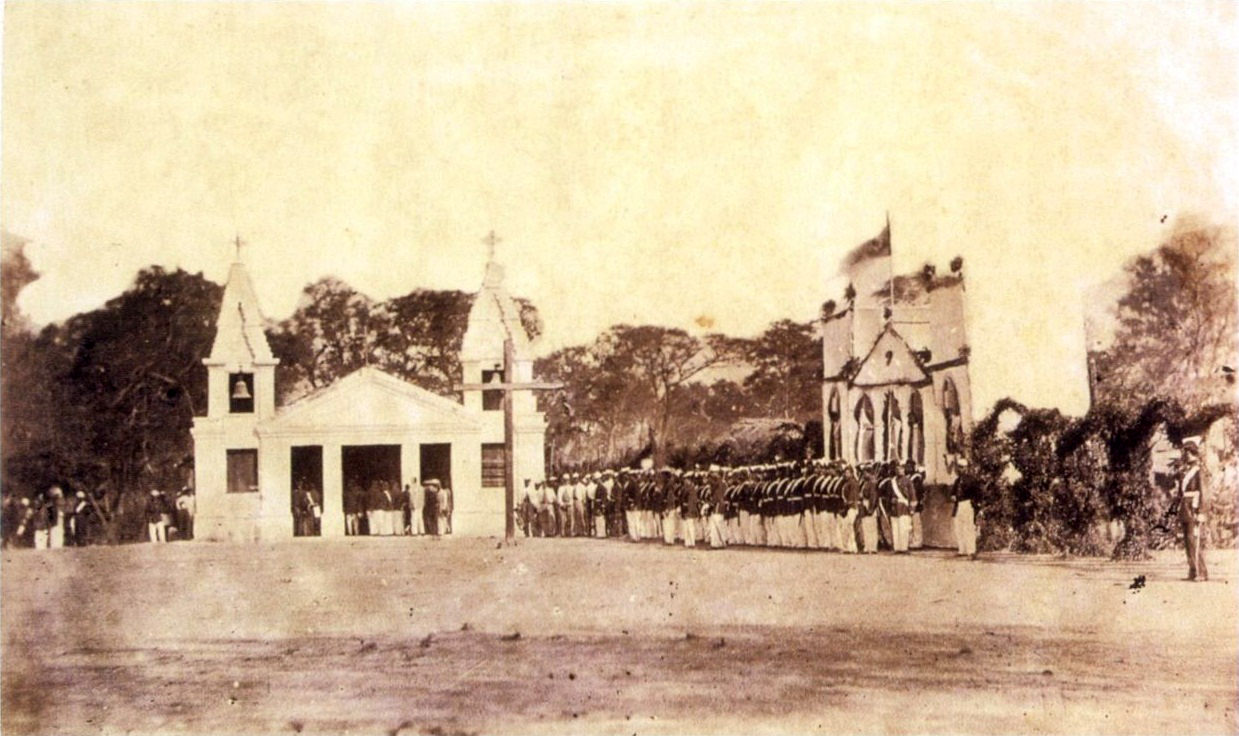
Brazilian troops in Rio Grande do Sul heading toward the front, 1865

In early March, Flores assembled a cabinet composed entirely of Colorados, among them a brother of the Blanco Leandro Gómez. The new Uruguayan president purged government departments of employees with Fusionist or Blanco associations. All Blanco officers and enlisted men were eliminated from the army and replaced by those Colorado and Brazilian loyalists who had remained with Flores throughout the conflict. Public commemorations glorified the Colorados, and a monument dedicated to the "Martyrs of Quinteros" was erected. The costs of the Liberating Crusade are unknown. Flores' losses amounted to around 450 dead and wounded; there are no estimates of the number of civilians who died of famine and disease, nor is it known how much damage was sustained by the national economy. The effects of the Uruguayan War have received little attention from historians, who have been drawn to focus on the dramatic devastation suffered by Paraguay in the subsequent Paraguayan War. (Note: No figures are given in classic contemporary works such as George Thompson's The War in Paraguay (published in 1869), George Frederick Masterman's Seven eventful years in Paraguay (1870), Richard Francis Burton's Letters from the battlefields of Paraguay (1870), Charles Ames Washburn's The History of Paraguay (1871), Max von Versen's Reisen in Amerika und der Südamerikanische Krieg (1872) and Louis Schneider's Der Krieg der Triple-Allianz (1872–75). The subject is also ignored in later, well-known histories such as José Bernardino Bormann's A Campanha do Uruguai (1907), Augusto Tasso Fragoso's História da Guerra entre a Tríplice Aliança e o Paraguai (1934) and Francisco Doratioto's Maldita guerra: nova história da Guerra do Paraguai (2002). The same omission is found in English-language works that deal with the war, such as Thomas L. Whigham's The Paraguayan War: Causes and early conduct (2002), Chris Leuchars' To the bitter end: Paraguay and the War of the Triple Alliance (2002), Hendrik Kraay and Thomas L. Whigham's I die with my country: perspectives on the Paraguayan War, 1864–1870 (2004) and Terry D. Hooker's The Paraguayan War (2008).)

News of the war's end was brought by Pereira Pinto and met with joy in Rio de Janeiro. Brazilian Emperor Dom Pedro II found himself waylaid by a crowd of thousands in the streets amid acclamations. But public opinion quickly changed for the worse, when newspapers began running stories painting the accord of 20 February as harmful to Brazilian interests, for which the cabinet was blamed. The newly raised Viscount of Tamandaré and Mena Barreto (now Baron of São Gabriel) had supported the peace accord. Tamandaré changed his mind soon afterward and played along with the allegations. Paranhos (a member of the opposition party) was used as a scapegoat by the Emperor and the government, and was recalled in disgrace to the imperial capital. Subsequent events show the accusation was unfounded. Not only had Paranhos managed to settle all Brazilian claims, but by avoiding the death of thousands, he gained a willing and grateful Uruguayan ally, not a dubious and resentful one—who provided Brazil an important base of operations during the war with Paraguay that followed.

Victory brought mixed results for Brazil and Argentina. As the Brazilian government had expected, the conflict was a short-lived and relatively easy affair that led to the installation of a friendly government in Uruguay. The official estimates included 549 battlefield casualties (109 dead, 439 wounded and 1 missing) from the navy and army and an unknown number who died from disease. Historian José Bernardino Bormann put the total at 616 (204 dead, 411 wounded and 1 missing). The war would have been deemed an outstanding success for Brazil, had it not been for its terrible consequences. Instead of demonstrating strength, Brazil revealed military weakness that an emboldened Paraguay sought to exploit. From the Argentine viewpoint, most of Bartolomé Mitre's expectations were frustrated by the war's outcome. He had succeeded in bringing to power his friend and ally, but the minimal risk and cost to Argentina he had envisioned at the outset proved to be illusory. The resulting attack by Paraguay on Brazilian and Argentine provinces sparked the long and devastating Paraguayan War.

== Bibliography ==
- Barroso, Gustavo (1935). História Militar do Brasil (in Portuguese). São Paulo: Companhia Editora Nacional.
- Bethell, Leslie (1985). The Cambridge History of Latin America. Vol. 3. Cambridge: Cambridge University Press. ISBN 0-521-23224-4.
- Bormann, José Bernardino (1907). A Campanha do Uruguay (1864–65) (in Portuguese). Rio de Janeiro: Imprensa Nacional.
- Box, Pelham Horton (1930). The Origins of the Paraguayan War. Urbana, IL: University of Illinois Studies in the Social Sciences.
- Carvalho, José Murilo de (2007). D. Pedro II: Ser ou Não Ser (in Portuguese). São Paulo: Companhia das Letras. ISBN 978-85-359-0969-2.
- Costa, Wilma Peres (1996). A Espada de Dâmocles: o Exército, a Guerra do Paraguai e a Crise do Império (in Portuguese). São Paulo: HUCITEC. ISBN 85-271-0245-5.
- Golin, Tau (2004). A Fronteira (in Portuguese). Vol. 2. Porto Alegre: L&PM. ISBN 978-85-254-1438-0.
- Graham, Robert Bontine Cunninghame (1933). Portrait of a Dictator. London: William Heinemann.
- Hooker, Terry D. (2008). The Paraguayan War. Nottingham: Foundry Books. ISBN 978-1-901543-15-5.
- Kraay, Hendrik; Whigham, Thomas L. (2004). I Die with My Country: Perspectives on the Paraguayan War, 1864–1870. Dexter, Michigan: Thomson-Shore. ISBN 978-0-8032-2762-0.
- Leuchars, Chris (2002). To the Bitter End: Paraguay and the War of the Triple Alliance. Westport, Connecticut: Greenwood Press. ISBN 0-313-32365-8.
- Maia, Prado (1975). A Marinha de Guerra do Brasil na Colônia e no Império (in Portuguese) (2 ed.). Rio de Janeiro: Cátedra.
- Munro, Dana Gardner (1960). The Latin American Republics: A History (3 ed.). New York: Appleton-Century-Crofts.
- Needell, Jeffrey D. (2006). The Party of Order: the Conservatives, the State, and Slavery in the Brazilian Monarchy, 1831–1871. Stanford, California: Stanford University Press. ISBN 978-0-8047-5369-2.
- Osório, Joaquim Luís; Osório, Fernando Luís (1915). História do General Osório (in Portuguese). Vol. 1. Pelotas: Tipografia do Diário Popular.
- Raine, Philip (1956). Paraguay. New Brunswick, New Jersey: Scarecrow Press.
- Schneider, Louis (2009). A Guerra da Tríplice Aliança Contra o Paraguai (in Portuguese). Porto Alegre: Pradense. ISBN 978-85-89072-13-7.
- Silva, Alfredo Pretextato Maciel da (1906b). Os Generais do Exército Brasileiro de 1822 a 1889: Traços Biográficos (in Portuguese). Vol. 2. Rio de Janeiro: M. Orosco & C.
- Tasso Fragoso, Augusto (2009). História da Guerra entre a Tríplice Aliança e o Paraguai (in Portuguese). Vol. 1 (3 ed.). Rio de Janeiro: Biblioteca do Exército.
- Williams, Mary Wilhelmine (1937). Dom Pedro the Magnanimous, Second Emperor of Brazil. Chapel Hill, North Carolina: University of North Carolina Press.
- Whigham, Thomas L. (2002). The Paraguayan War: Causes and Early Conduct. Vol. 1. Lincoln, Nebraska: University of Nebraska Press. ISBN 978-0-8032-4786-4.
