= Joaquim José Pinto =

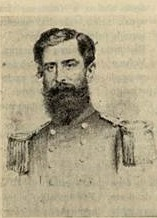
- Born: October 1826; São João da Barra, Rio de Janeiro, Brazil
- Died: 25 December 1884 (aged 58); Rio de Janeiro, Rio de Janeiro, Brazil
- Military career
- Allegiance: Empire of Brazil
- Branch: Imperial Brazilian Navy
- Service years: 1842–1884
- Rank: Division Chief
- Commands: Jequitinhonha
- Conflicts: Uruguayan War; Siege of Salto; Paraguayan War; Battle of the Riachuelo

Joaquim José Pinto (October 1826 – 25 December 1884) was a Brazilian Division Chief and was notable for his participation at the Siege of Salto and his command of the Jequitinhonha during the Battle of the Riachuelo.

== Early life ==
He was born in the village of São João da Barra, Rio de Janeiro in October 1826. He was the son of Francisco José Pinto and Maria Máxima das Neves. Pinto became an aspirant to guarda-marinha (midshipman) on 17 February 1842 after enrolling at the Navy Academy on the 21st of that same month and was promoted to midshipman on 22 November 1844.

== Paraguayan War ==
With the rank of lieutenant captain, he took part in the Paraguayan War, especially in the Corrientes campaign and in the Battle of Riachuelo, when he commanded the corvette Jequitinhonha. In the latter clash, as a result of a maneuver ordered by Division Chief José Segundino de Gomensoro, the Jequitinhonha ran aground on a sandbar of the Riachuelo stream, coming under heavy enemy fire from the nearby ravines. Even so, he was able to open fire on the enemy steamer Paraguarí, causing severe damage that put the ship out of action, almost sinking it. He even repelled the boarding from the Paraguayan steamers Taquarí, Salto and Marques de Olinda. After the battle, despite all the efforts to lift the ship, it was not possible to do so and, under these conditions, admiral Francisco Manuel Barroso ordered that the vessel be abandoned and set on fire on June 13 though the ship's guns were seized by the Paraguayans.

Pinto died on 25 December 1884 in the city of Rio de Janeiro.

== Ranks ==
- Aspirant to Midshipman: 17 February 1842
- Midshipman: 22 November 1844
- Second Lieutenant: 2 December 1846
- First Lieutenant: 2 December 1854
- Captain Lieutenant: 10 November 1864
- Frigate Captain: 29 December 1867
- Captain of Sea and War: 30 December 1878
- Division Chief: 23 December 1884
