= Siege of Salto =

1864 military operation in Uruguay

- Part of the Uruguayan War
Date	November 22, 1864 – November 28, 1864
Location	Salto, Uruguay
Result	Brazilian victory

Belligerents
Empire of Brazil; Colorados	Uruguay

Commanders and leaders
(Empire of Brazil) Joaquim José Pinto; Venancio Flores	(Uruguay) José G. Palomeque

Strength
Brazil: 2 gunboats Colorados: Unknown	Unknown

Casualties and losses
Unknown	Unknown

The siege of Salto occurred during the Uruguayan War, from the 22nd to the 28th of November 1864, when Brazilian forces (under Marquis of Tamandaré) and Colorado forces (under Venancio Flores) attempted to capture the city of Salto in Uruguay from its Uruguayan Army defenders.

Two Brazilian gunboats under First Lieutenant Joaquim José Pinto blockaded the town. On 24 November, Flores arrived with his troops and began the siege. Colonel José Palomeque, commander of the Uruguayan garrison, surrendered almost without firing a shot, on the afternoon of 28 November. Flores' army captured and incorporated four artillery pieces and 250 men; 300 Colorados and 150 Brazilians were left behind to occupy the town.

== Bibliography ==
- Barroso, Gustavo (1935). História Militar do Brasil (in Portuguese). São Paulo: Companhia Editora Nacional.
- Bormann, José Bernardino (1907). A Campanha do Uruguay (1864–65) (in Portuguese). Rio de Janeiro: Imprensa Nacional.
- Maia, Prado (1975). A Marinha de Guerra do Brasil na Colônia e no Império (in Portuguese) (2 ed.). Rio de Janeiro: Cátedra.
- Schneider, Louis (2009). A Guerra da Tríplice Aliança Contra o Paraguai (in Portuguese). Porto Alegre: Pradense. ISBN 978-85-89072-13-7.
- Tasso Fragoso, Augusto (2009). História da Guerra entre a Tríplice Aliança e o Paraguai (in Portuguese). Vol. 1 (3 ed.). Rio de Janeiro: Biblioteca do Exército.
