= Brazilian gunboat Ypiranga =

Warship of the Imperial Brazilian Navy

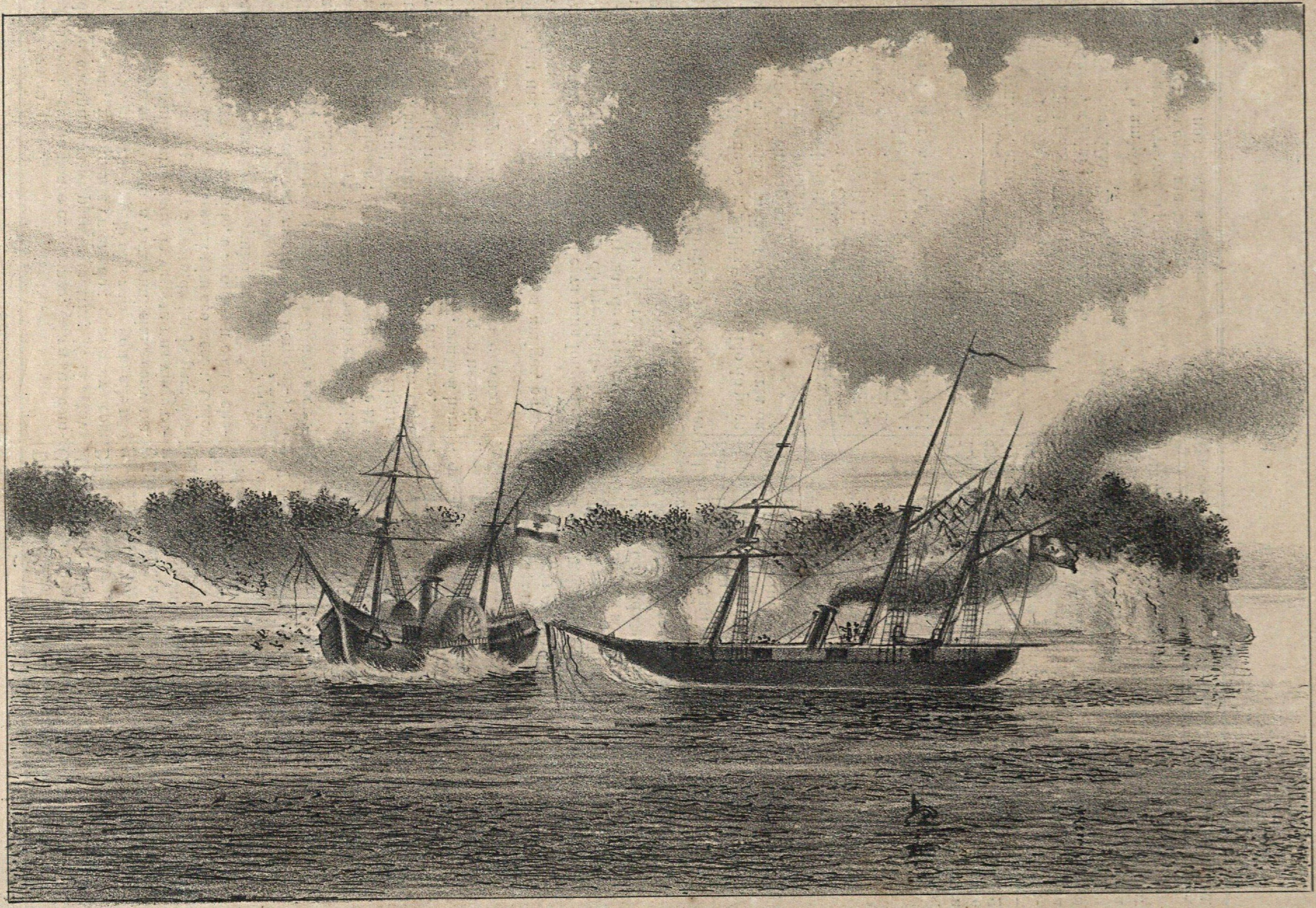
- Ypiranga commanded by Álvaro de Carvalho, defeats the Paraguayan war steamer Saltó.

History

Empire of Brazil
- Name: Ypiranga
- Namesake: Ipiranga Brook
- Builder: Arsenal de Marinha do Rio de Janeiro
- Launched: 23 September 1854
- Decommissioned: 1880

General characteristics
- Type: Gunboat
- Displacement: 70,0000 lb (350 t)
- Length: 129 ft (39 m)
- Beam: 18 ft (5.5 m)
- Draught: 8.62 ft (2.63 m)
- Propulsion: Steam boiler for propulsion in the stern propeller
- Speed: 9 knots (17 km/h; 10 mph)
- Troops: 171
- Armament: 7 cannons
- Armor: Hull; 12 in (300 mm) midships; 7 in (180 mm) fore and aft; 12 in. main towers; 3 in (76 mm) deck; 4 in (100 mm) control tower

The Brazilian gunboat Ypiranga was a warship of the Imperial Brazilian Navy, having acted in the Paraguayan War. She was the third ship to bear this name in the Brazilian Navy, referring to the historic brook in São Paulo, and was the first propeller-driven warship designed and built in Brazil.

== Characteristics ==
Ypiranga was launched in 1854 and had a crew of up to 171 men. She was powered by a steam engine with 70 hp that propelled her to reach a speed of up to 9 knots. The ship's dimensions were 129 ft. (39,4 m) long, 18 ft. (5,52 m) wide, and a draught of 8,62 ft. (2.63 m) with a displacement of 350 tons. She was equipped with 7 cannons, one of which was a 2nd class 30 caliber, arranged in a wheelbarrow, and six others, of the same caliber and 5th class, positioned in the battery. Its garrison, in times of peace, was set at 104 men.

She had her keel laid on October 20, 1852, and was baptized by a Notice of December 20 of the same year, in honor of the historic São Paulo brook where Pedro I launched the cry of Brazil's Independence. She was launched to sea on September 29, 1854, and on October 19 of that year, she had her armament show. Her first commander was Captain lieutenant João Gomes de Aguiar.

The gunboat Ypiranga was designed by Napoleão Level, built by the Arsenal de Marinha in Rio de Janeiro, and was the first propeller-driven warship produced in the country.

== History ==
On May 18, 1863, lieutenant Captain Manuel Antônio Vital de Oliveira took command of the ship. On January 27, 1864, he helped the French gunboat Lutim rescue a French galley that had been shipwrecked on the Rio de Janeiro coast. On February 18, 1864, he left for hydrographic services in southern Brazil.

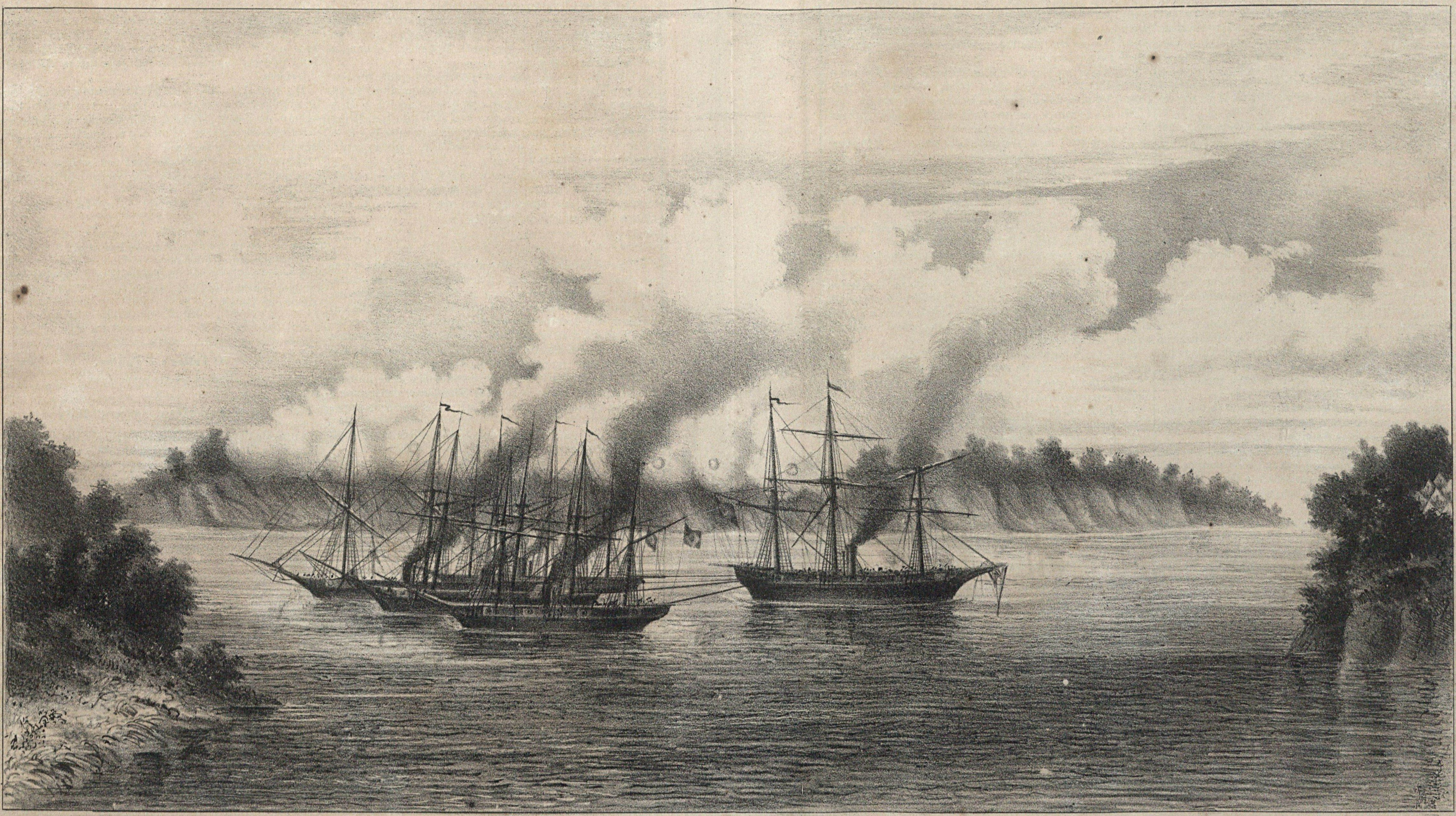
Episode from June 13, 1865. Battle of Riachuelo. The gunboats Ypiranga (with Álvaro de Carvalho), Mearim (under Barbosa), Araguari (under Hoonholtz) and Iguatemi (under Coimbra), working on unstowing the Jequitinhonha. Painting by Fleiuss (1865).

The Ypiranga participated in the Paraguayan War from the beginning, its first action being the blockade of April 5, 1865. On April 5, 1865, she left for the naval blockade of Paraguay, being part of Chief José Segundino de Gomensoro's Division.

On April 30, 1865, the gunboat left for Buenos Aires under the command of Senior lieutenant Álvaro Augusto de Carvalho intending to sail up the Paraná River to effectively blockade the enemy naval forces. Ypiranga was part of Admiral Barroso's squadron, together with the frigate Amazonas (captainship), the corvettes Beberibe, Belmonte, and Parnahyba, and the gunboats Araguary, Mearim, Iguatemy, and Jequitinhonha. For this mission, Ypiranga had 98 soldiers and 8 navy officers in its crew, as well as a detachment of 61 soldiers and 4 officers from the Rio de Janeiro police.

On June 11, 1865, the Fleet engaged the enemy in the Battle of Riachuelo. The ship had one cabin boy killed and a few wounded in the encounter. Some material damages were easily repaired.

Still in the war campaign, on June 18, 1865, Ypiranga supported the squadron during the fortified pass of Mercedes and, on August 12, she stopped in order to support the pass of Cuevas. In this combat, the ship, which closed the column due to its short march, was heavily attacked by enemy forces, leaving one dead and seven wounded.

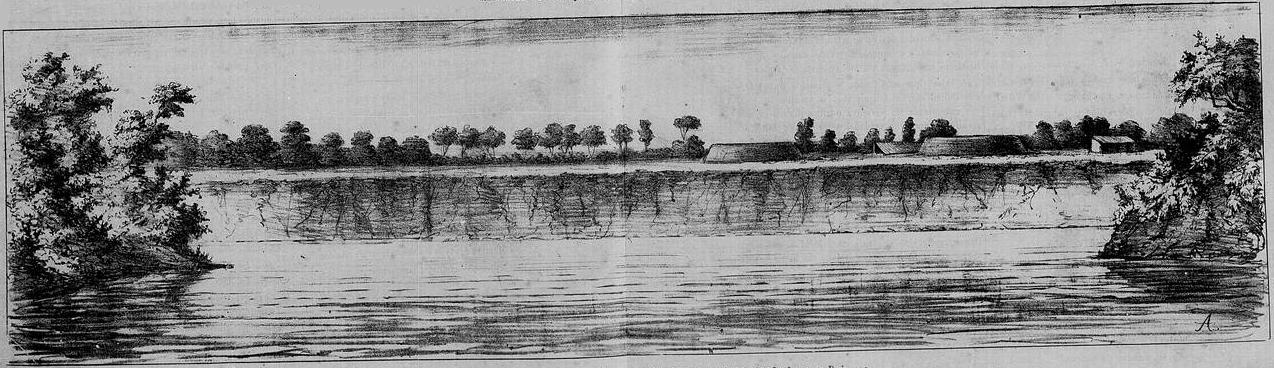
View of the ravines and fortifications of Curupaity, docking place of the ship Princesa.

Her commander, Chief Lieutenant Álvaro Augusto de Carvalho, shot down due to typhoid fever, contrary to his commanders, was carried to the deck where he could command the actions of his men throughout the combat. On April 16, 1866, she took part in the actions at the Vitória pass, where the ship was responsible for protecting the landing of the army troops. In the same month, she participated in the bombardments against enemy positions at the Itapiru Fortress. On July 13, Chief lieutenant Antônio Maria do Couto and seven soldiers from a patrol boat were killed by a torpedo explosion. In September 1866, she participated in the bombardment of the Curuzú and Curupaiti Forts.

With the end of fighting in the campaign of the Triple Alliance and the consequent declaration of peace, she returned to Rio de Janeiro.

By Notice, of April 28, 1875, she became subordinate to the 2nd Naval District and, by another Notice, of July 10, 1877, she was made available. In September 1881, she sailed from Pernambuco to Rocas Atoll, taking aboard the military engineer Colonel Alvim to study the placement of a lighthouse at that point. The ship remained at that location from September 24 until October 27 of that same year.

== Representation in culture ==
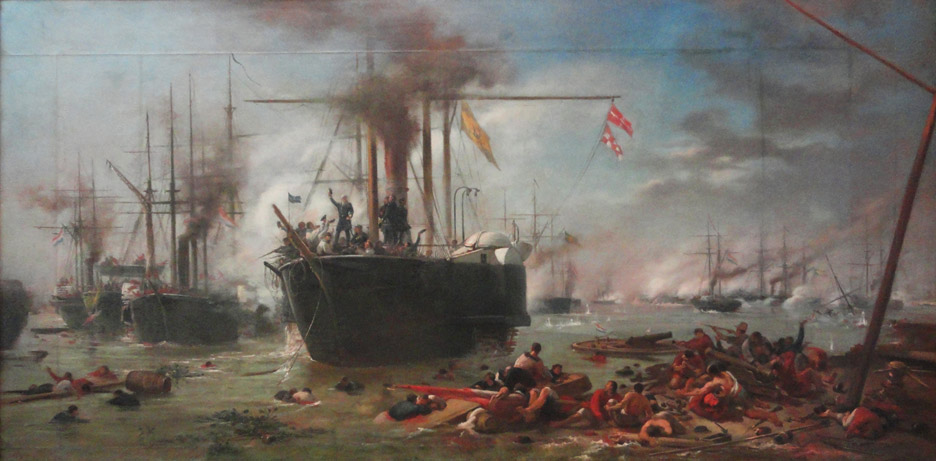
Artwork by Victor Meirelles, study for the Battle of Riachuelo.

== See also ==
- List of historical ships of the Brazilian Navy
