= Iguassú National Park Airport =

Former airport that served Foz do Iguaçu, Brazil

Iguassú (Iguaçu) National Park Airport Aeroporto do Parque Nacional do Iguassú (Iguaçu)
- IATA: none; ICAO: none

Summary
- Airport type: Defunct
- Serves: Foz do Iguaçu
- Opened: 1941
- Closed: 6 January 1974
- Coordinates: 25°31′32″S 054°35′12″W

Map
- Location in Brazil IGU (Brazil)
- Demolished, no longer operational.

Iguassú (Iguaçu after 1945) National Park Airport ~~(IATA: IGU)~~ was an airport that served Foz do Iguaçu, Brazil until 1974, when Foz do Iguaçu International Airport was opened. On that very occasion the airport was closed.

== History ==
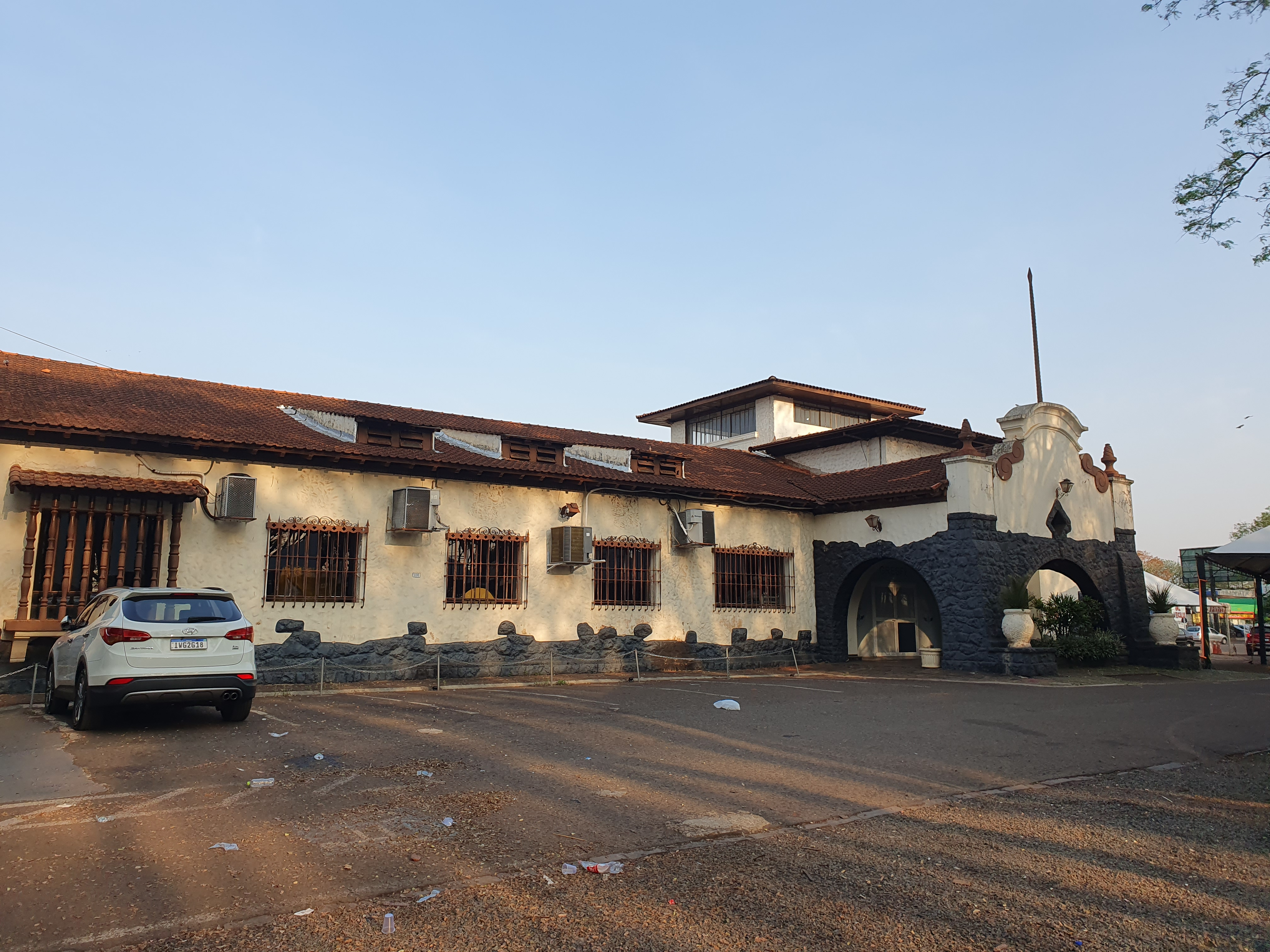
Terminal building

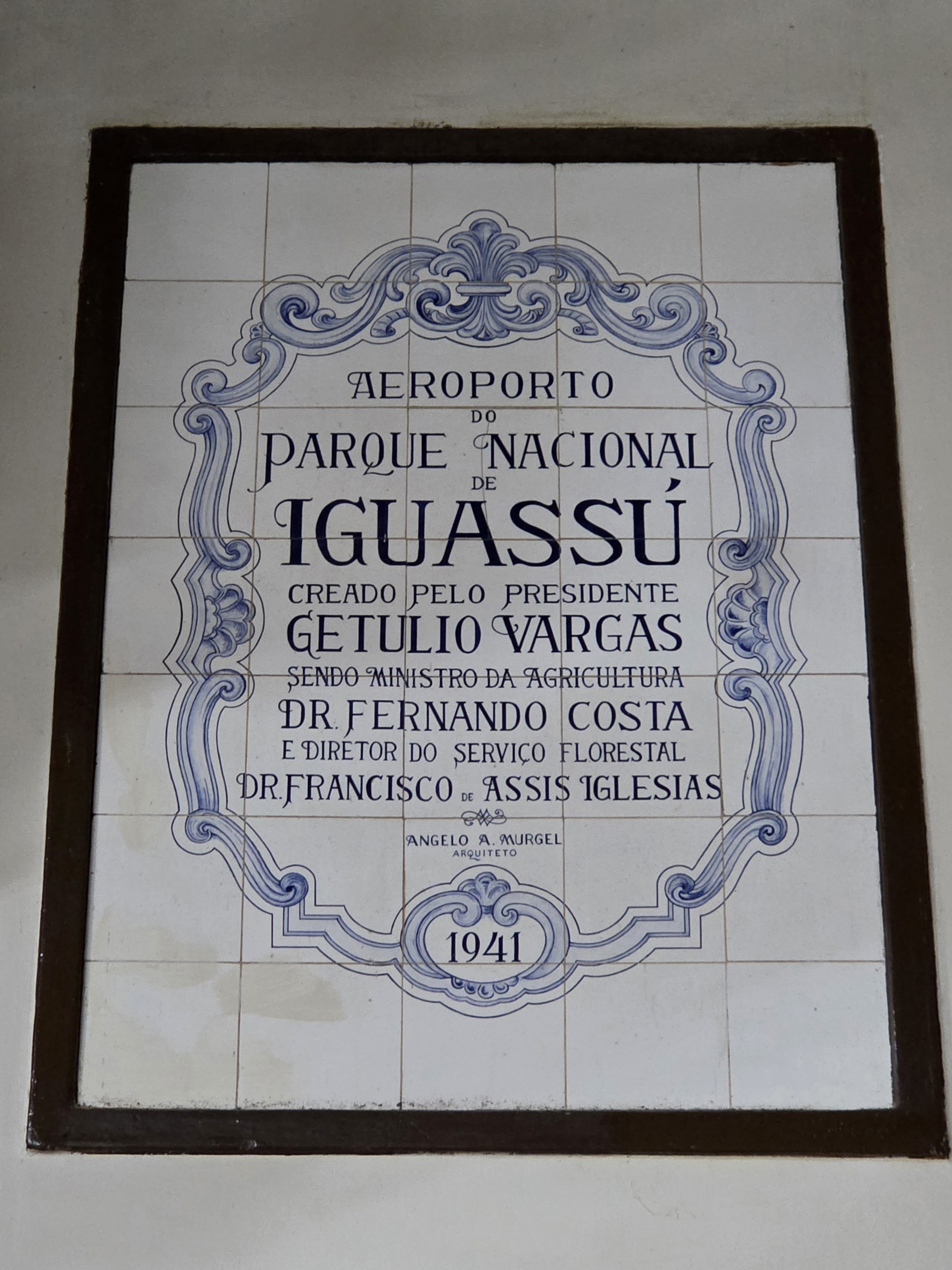
Plaque celebrating the official opening of the airport

Iguassú National Park Airport was the first airport of Foz do Iguaçu, Brazil. It was opened in 1941 but a landing strip existed on the site since 1935, when the first official flight landed on April 1. In 1938 Panair do Brasil started flying to the location as a stop on a flight from Rio de Janeiro and Curitiba to Asunción and Buenos Aires. In 1945 the spelling changed to Iguaçu National Park Airport.

Because of its proximity to the urban center, the airport was closed on January 6, 1974, when Foz do Iguaçu International Airport was opened at a different location.

The former runway is now a green area. The former terminal has been preserved as part of GRESFI club and since 26 August 2024 it is a City Heritage Protected building.

Panair do Brasil, Real, Sadia and Varig once served the airport.

== Access ==
The airport was located 1 km (1 mi) south of downtown Foz do Iguaçu.
