= Mesquita Omar Ibn Al-Khatab =

Mosque in Paraná, Brazil

Omar Ibn Al-Khatab Mosque
- Portuguese: Mesquita Omar Ibn Al-Khatab, Mesquita Foz Do Iguaçu
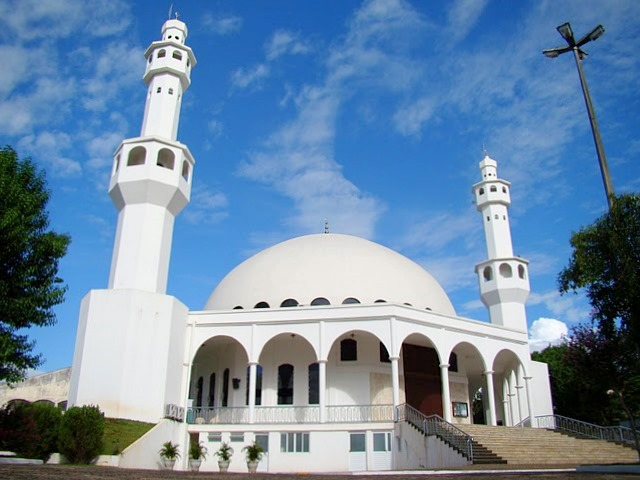
- Mesquita Foz Do Iguaçu, in 2010

- Location within Paraná

Religion
- Affiliation: Islam
- Ecclesiastical or organisational status: Mosque
- Status: Active

Location
- Location: Foz do Iguaçu, Paraná
- Country: Brazil
- Coordinates: 25°31′14.8″S 54°34′42.6″W

Architecture
- Type: Mosque architecture
- Completed: 1983

Specifications
- Interior area: 600 m^{2} (6,500 sq ft)
- Dome: 1
- Minaret: 2

The Omar Ibn Al-Khatab Mosque (Portuguese: Mesquita Foz Do Iguaçu) is a mosque located at Foz do Iguaçu, Paraná, Brazil. It is situated in the city near the Iguaçu Falls.

== Overview ==
The mosque was inaugurated on 23 March 1983 featuring an exterior design painted in uniform white color. Its architecture was inspired by Al-Aqsa Mosque, in Jerusalem. The mosque is named after Omar Ibn Al-Khatab, a pious companion of the Holy Prophet Muhammad صلى الله عليه وآله وسلم and one of the first four caliphs of Islam.

Outside the mosque are tall two minarets from which the Muslim call to prayer (Adaan) is sounded five times each day which gathers the faithful for congregational prayers in the spacious main hall. Inside the mosque, there is a spacious main prayer hall which covers 400 square metres (4,300 sq ft) of the total built area of 600 square metres (6,500 sq ft). In the main prayer hall, there is a Mihrab built into the back wall. The decorated Mihrab indicates the direction to the Holy Mosque of Mecca in Saudi Arabia, where all Muslims face when they pray.

== Gallery ==
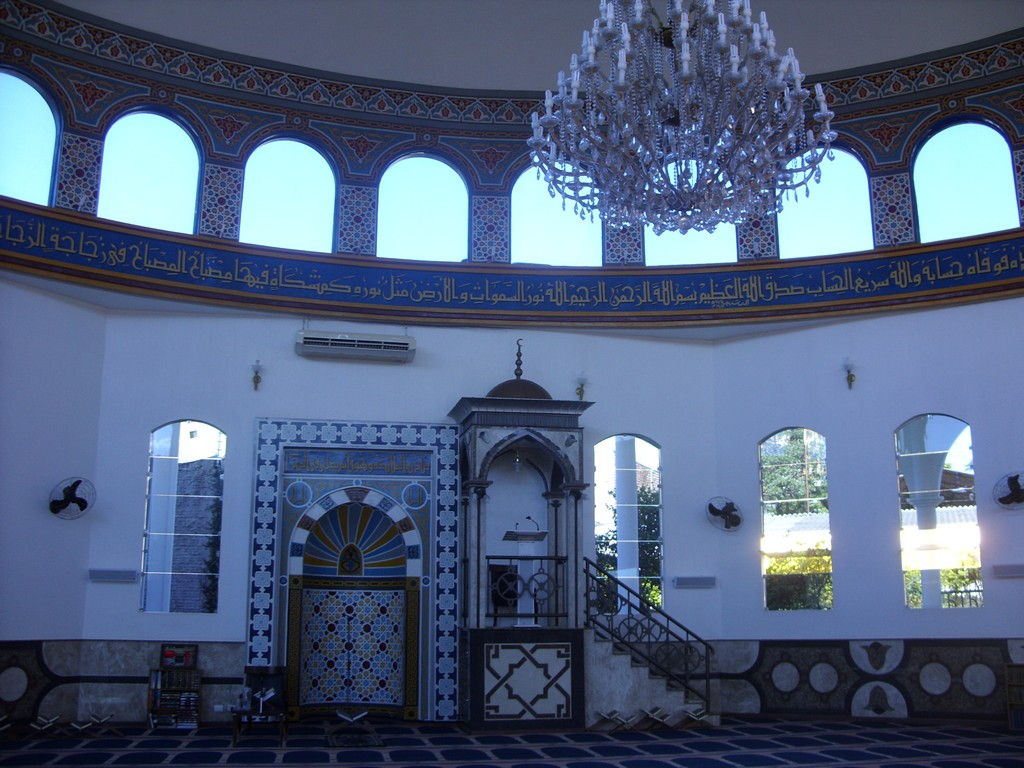
Mosque interior, main prayer hall

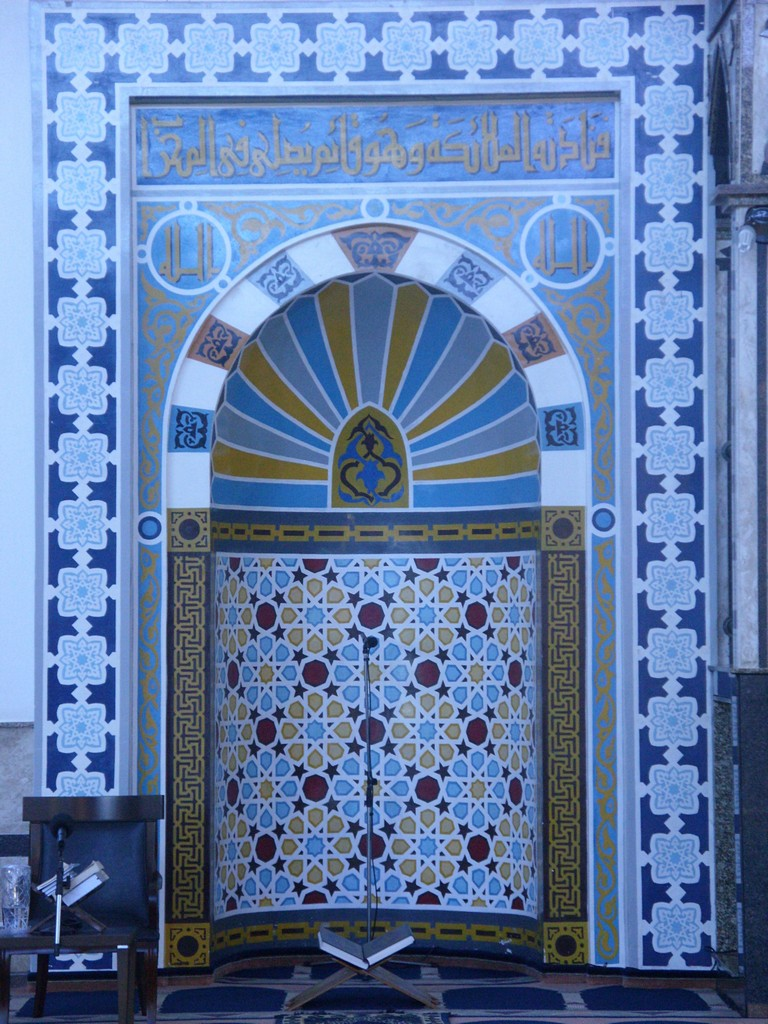
The mihrab inside the mosque, which indicates the direction to face when Muslims perform their prayer

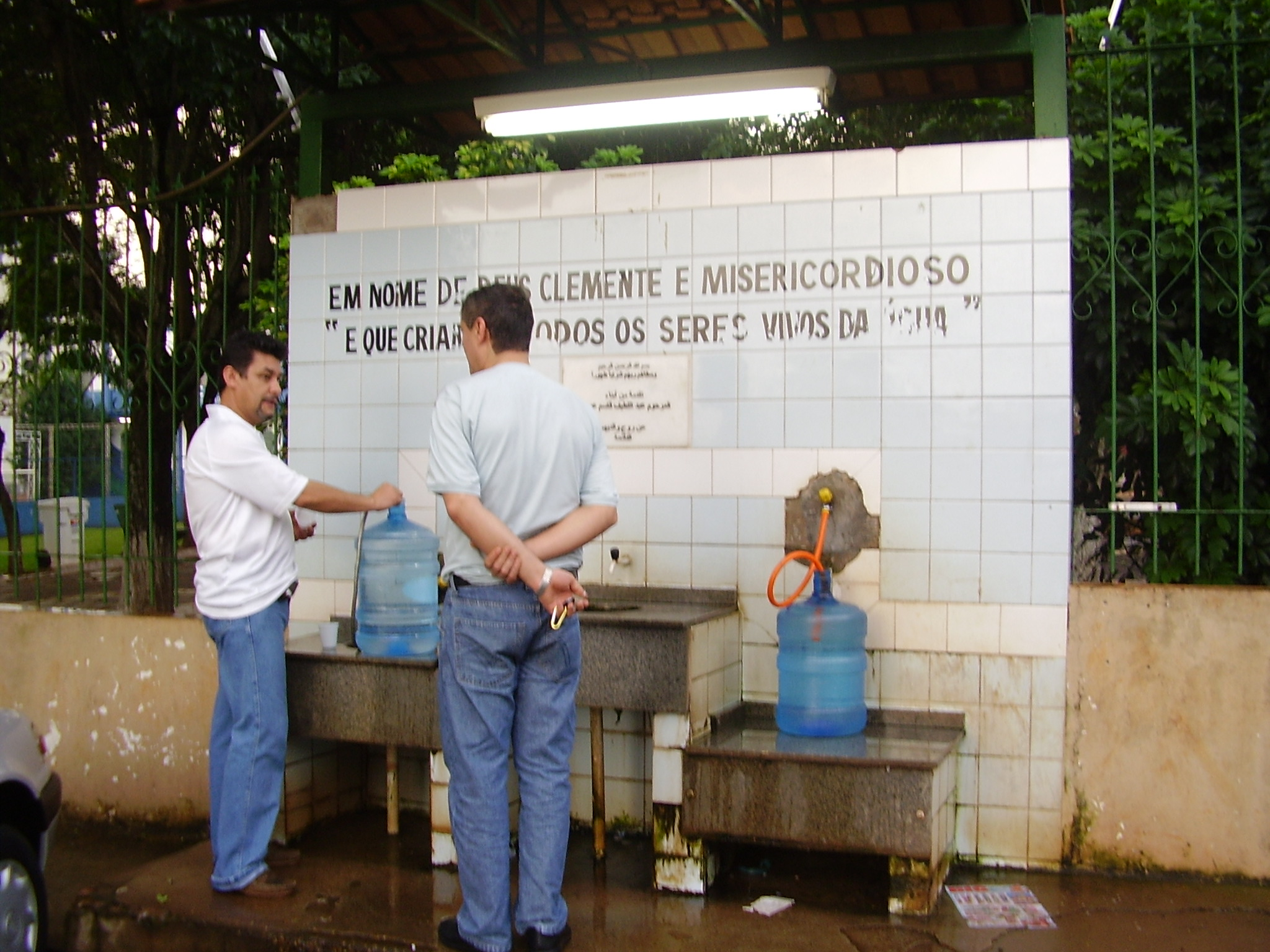

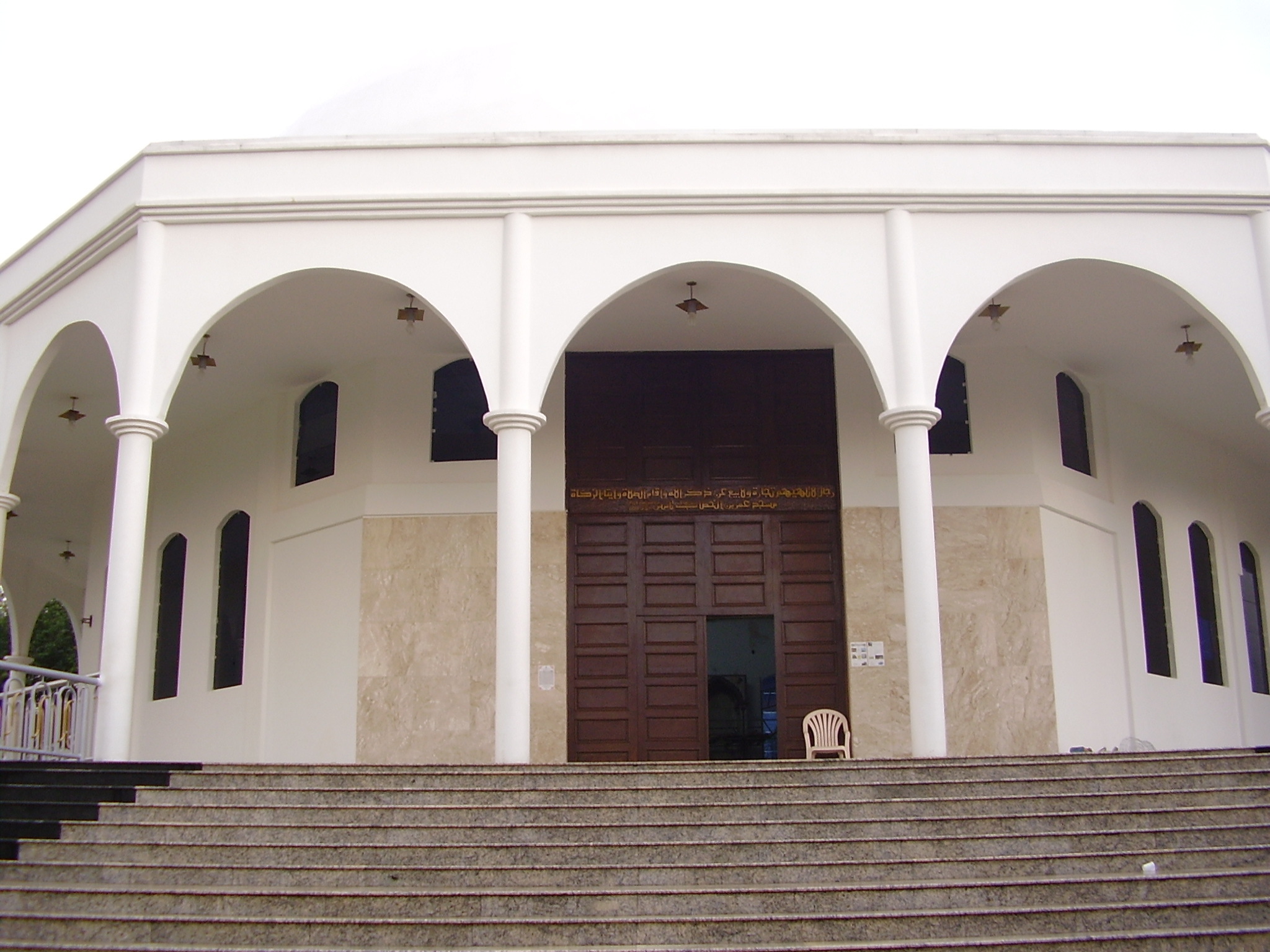
Mosque main entrance door

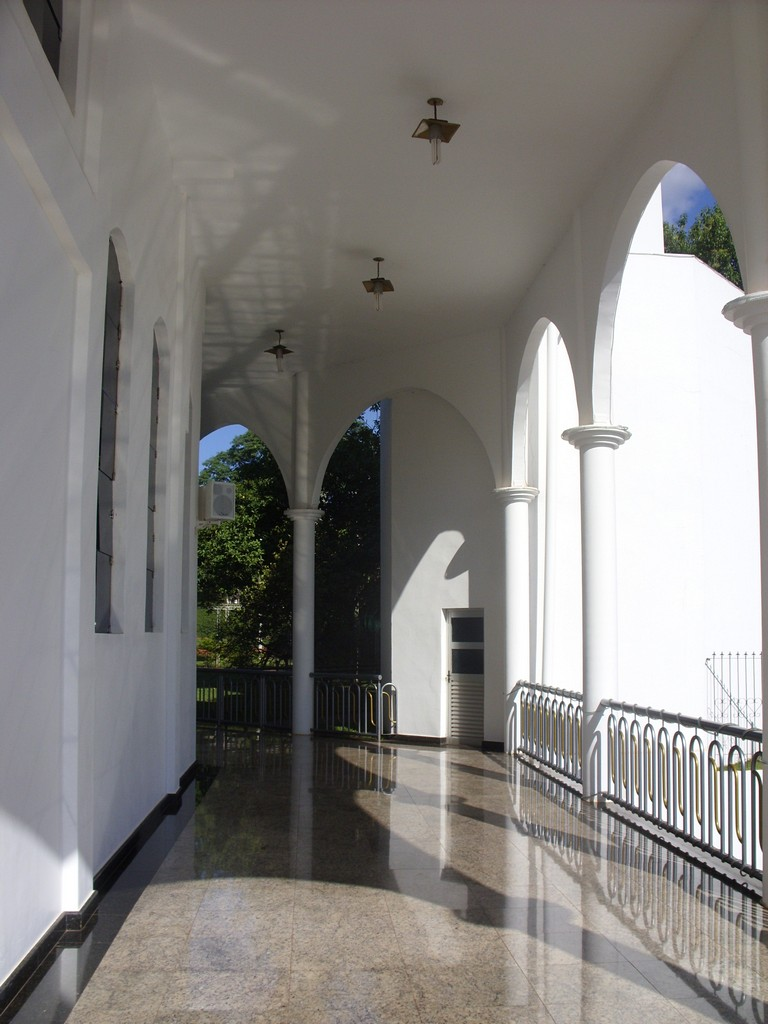

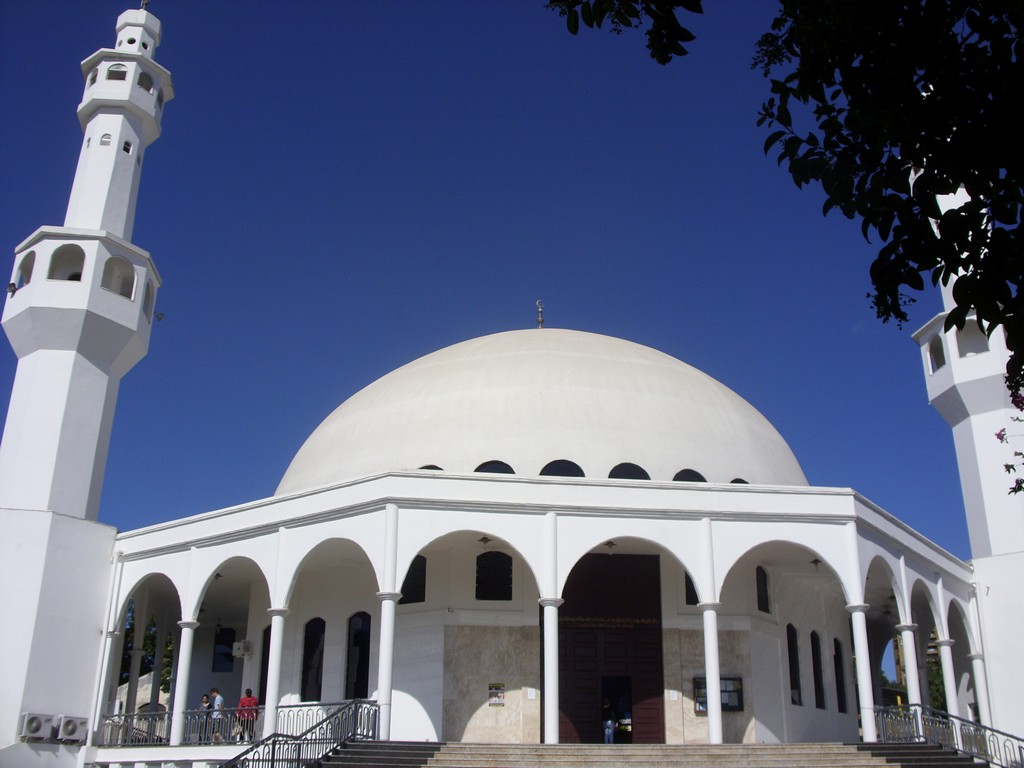

== See also ==
- Islam in Brazil
- List of mosques in Brazil
