= Foz do Iguaçu =

- Municipality
- Município de Foz de Iguaçu; Municipality of Foz do Iguaçu
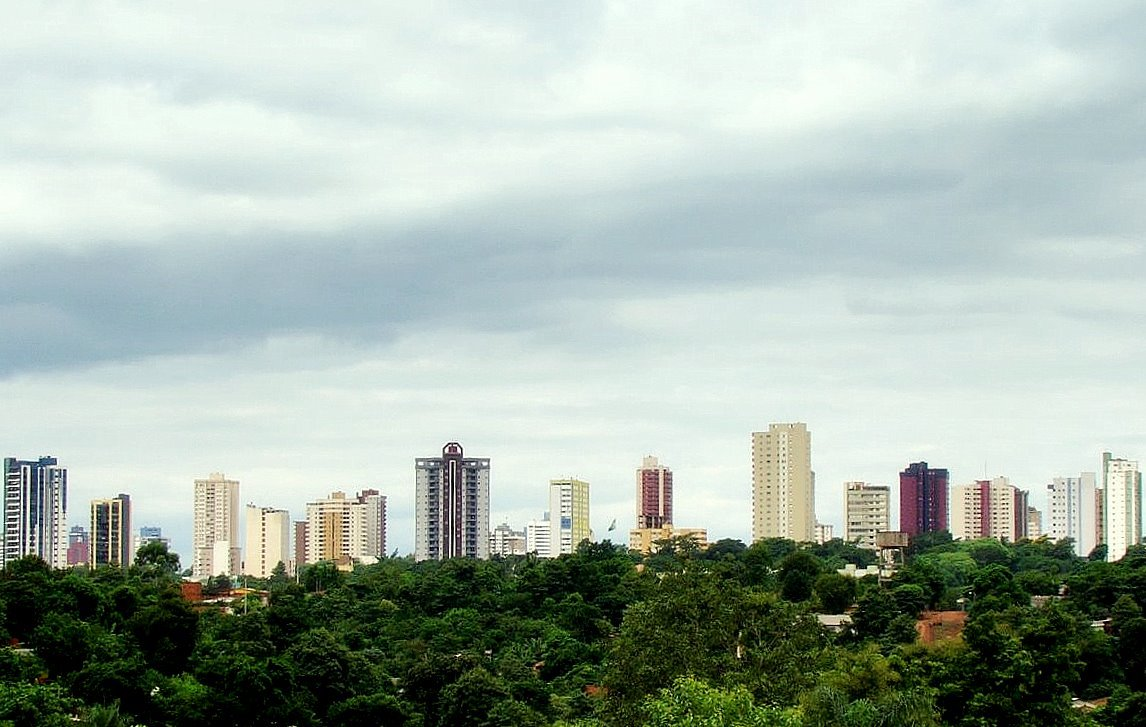
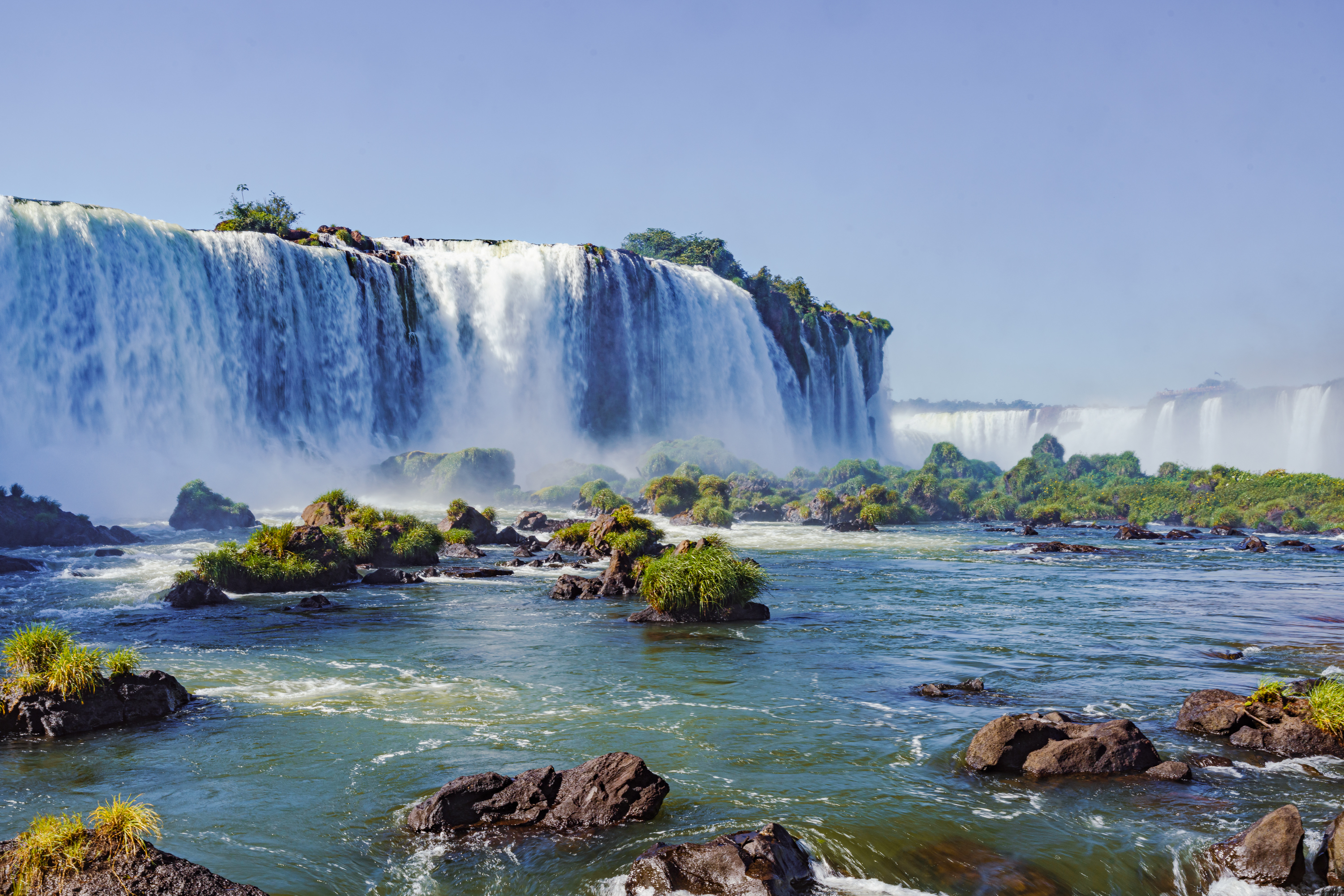
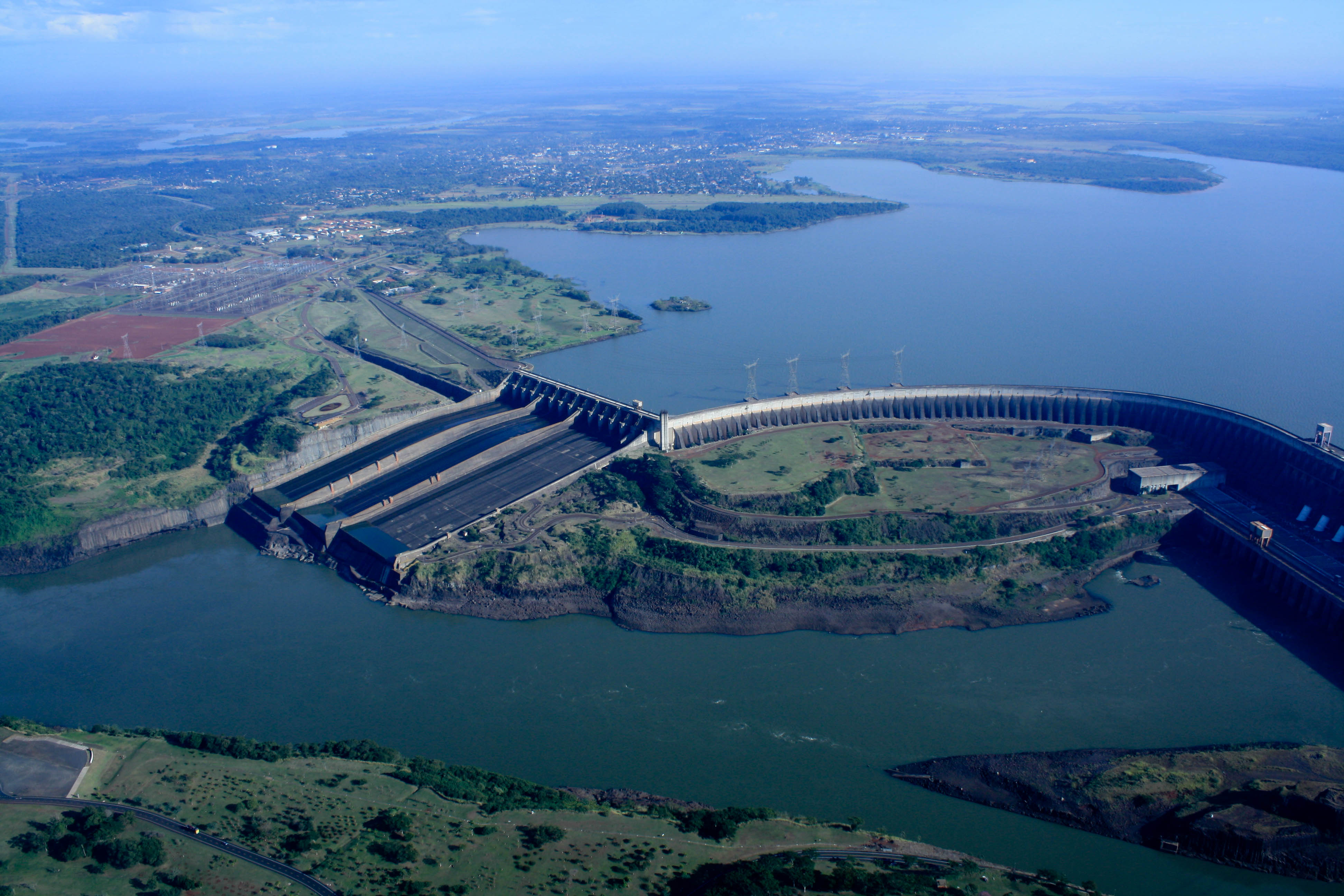
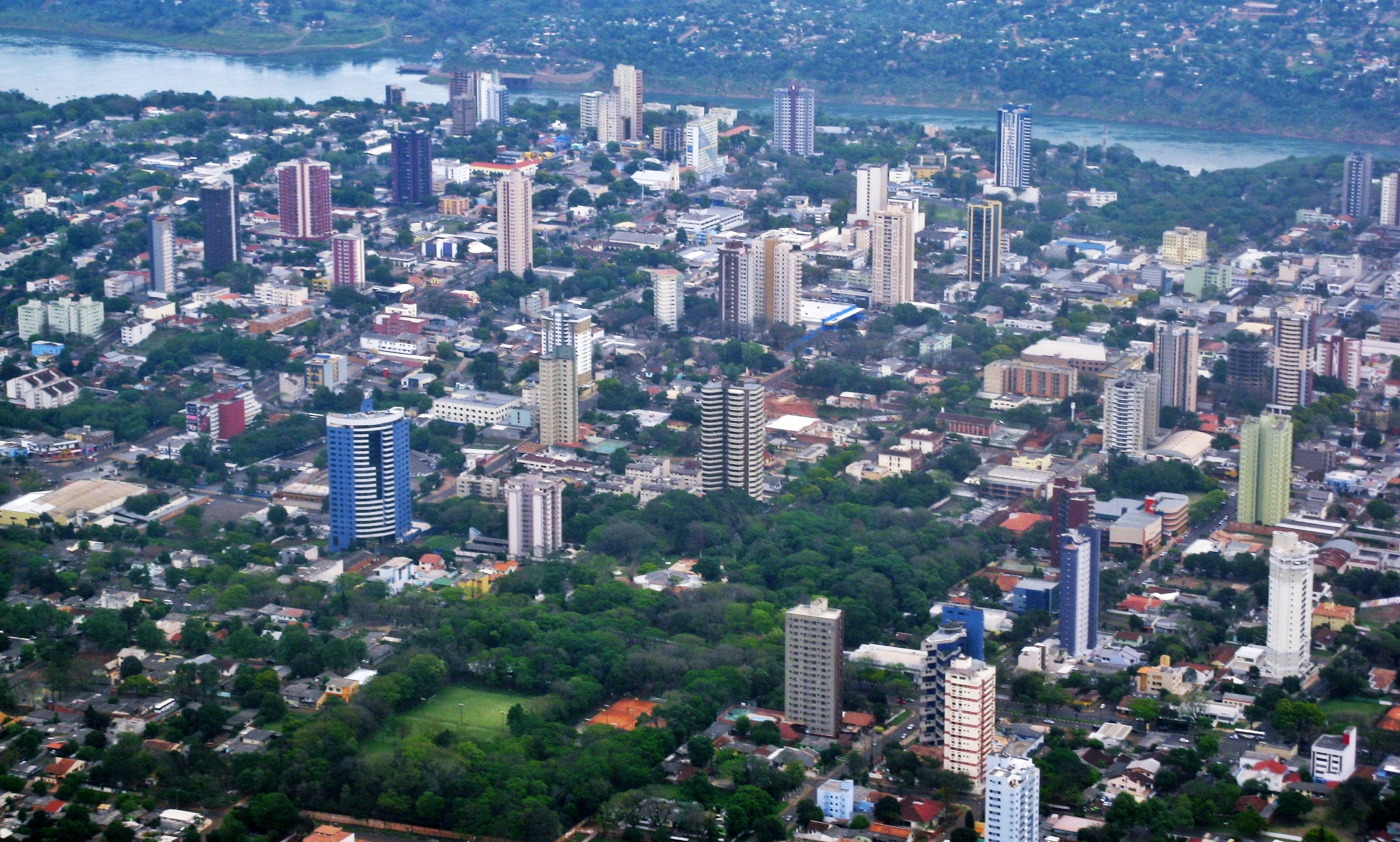
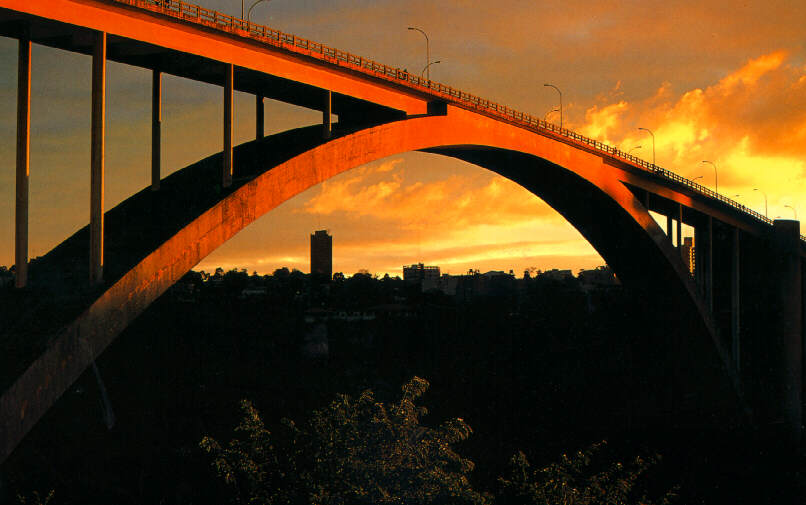
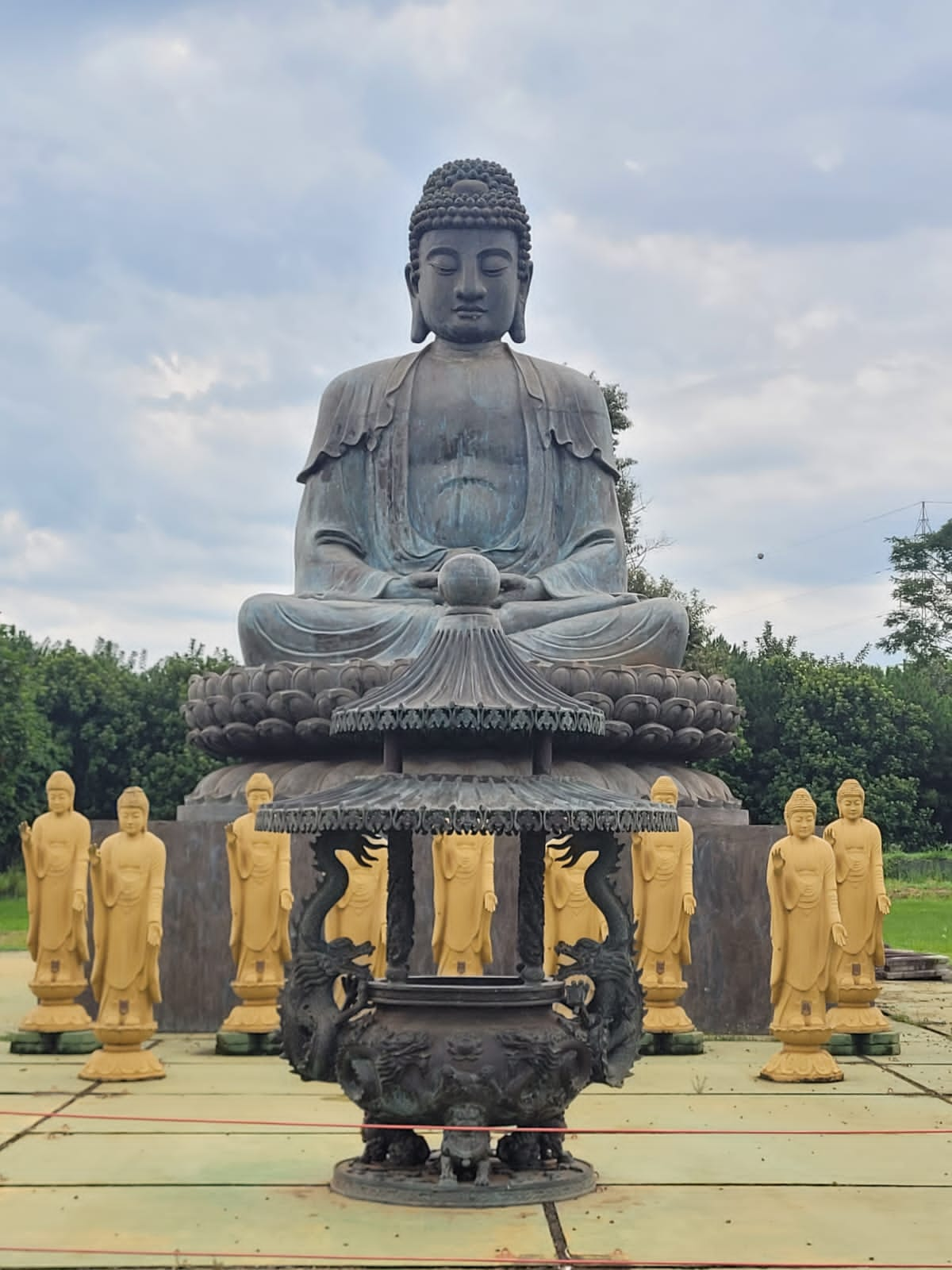
- City skyline Iguaçu National Park Itaipu Dam Downtown Friendship Bridge, between Brazil and Paraguay Chen Tien Buddhist Temple in Foz do Iguaçu

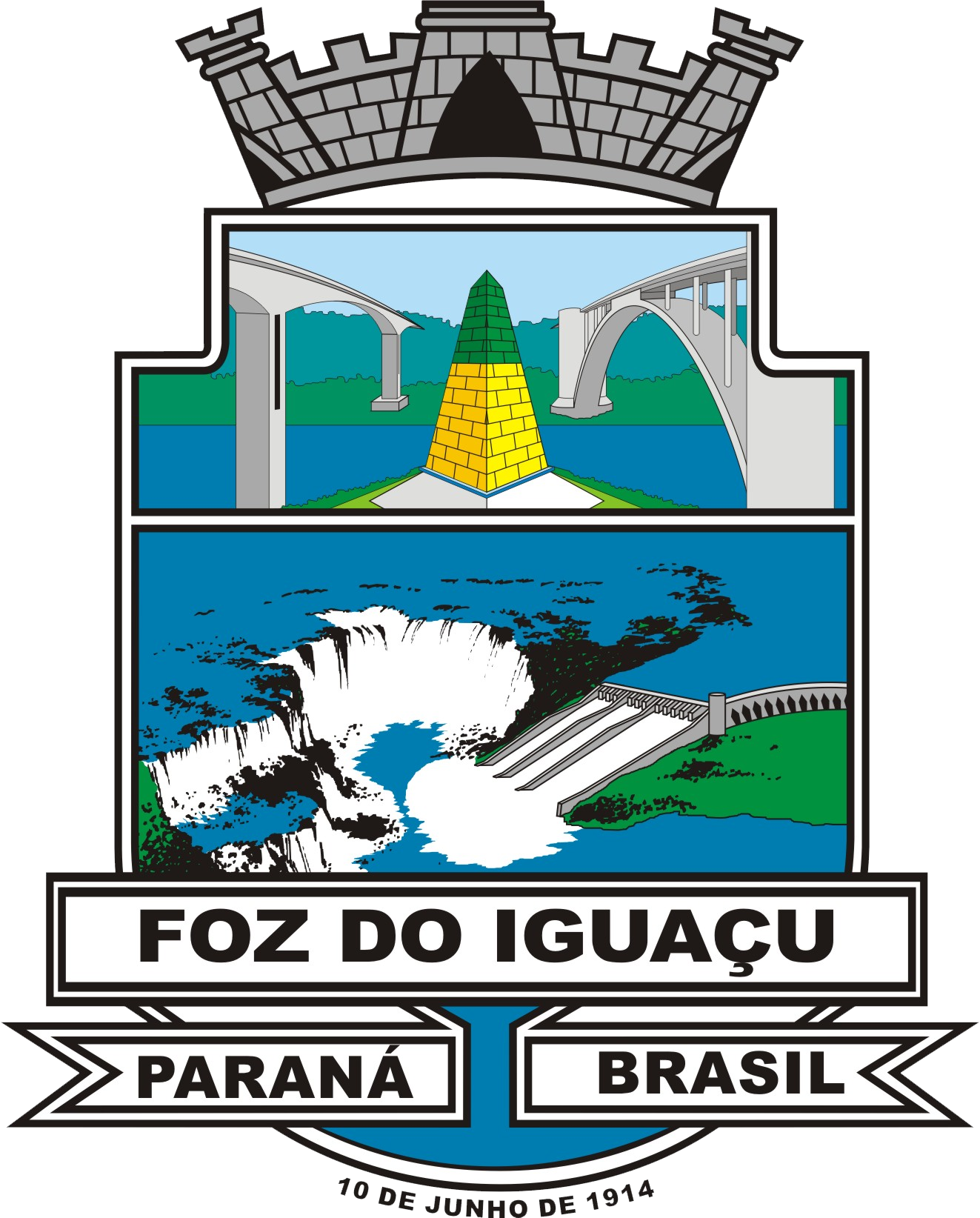
- Flag Coat of arms
- Nickname: Terra das Cataratas (Land of the Waterfalls)
- Location of Foz do Iguaçu
- Coordinates: 25°32′24″S 54°35′15″W
- Country: Brazil
- Region: Sul
- State: Paraná
- Founded: 10 June 1910

Government
  - Mayor: Joaquim Silva e Luna (PL)

Area
  - Municipality: 617.70 km^{2} (238.50 sq mi)
- Elevation: 164 m (538 ft)

Population (2025)
  - Municipality: 297,352
  - Density: 426.58/km^{2} (1,104.85/sq mi)
  - Urban: 98%
- Time zone: UTC-3 (UTC-3)
- Area code: +55 45
- Website: www.pmfi.pr.gov.br

Foz do Iguaçu (Brazilian Portuguese pronunciation: [ˈfɔz du iɡwaˈsu]; "Mouth of the Iguazu"), colloquially referred to as Foz, is the Brazilian city on the border of Iguaçu Falls. Foz in Portuguese means the mouth or end of a river and Iguaçu in Guarani or Tupi comes from the words y [ɨ], meaning "river", and guasu [waˈsu], meaning "big".

The city is the 7th largest in the state of Paraná with a population of approximately 258,000 inhabitants. It is approximately 650 km (400 mi) west of the capital of the state, Curitiba, being the westernmost city in that State.

The inhabitants of the city are known as iguaçuenses. The Iguaçu Falls located on the border of Argentina and Brazil and consisting of approximately 257 individual waterfalls over 2.7 km (1.7 mi) were chosen as one of the "New Natural Seven Wonders of the World."

The city is characterized by tourism and cultural diversity. There are about 80 nationalities, being the most representative from Italy, Portugal, Lebanon, China, Paraguay and Argentina. Foz do Iguaçu is integrated into a tri-national region, bordering the Argentine city of Puerto Iguazú and the Paraguayan city of Ciudad del Este. The city's economy is based on tourism, with emphasis on trade and services.

According to research conducted by the Brazilian Tourist Institute (Embratur) and the Foundation Institute of Economic Research (FIFE) in 2006, 2007 and 2008, Foz do Iguaçu was the 2nd most visited leisure destination by foreign tourists after Rio de Janeiro. In 2010, it received from the Brazilian Ministry of Tourism 10 awards for Best Practices and Competitiveness Index. Foz do Iguaçu has been noted as a destination by various national and international media: the British newspaper The Guardian considered it the best foreign destination for the UK. The U.S. TV network CNN classified it as one of the 14 most romantic destinations.

Foz do Iguaçu is home of the Itaipu Dam, the world's second largest hydroelectric plant in power generation, after the Three Gorges Dam in China. With 20 generator units and 14,000 MW of installed capacity, it provides approximately 15% of the energy consumed in Brazil and 86% of the energy consumed in Paraguay.

== Geography ==
=== Climate ===
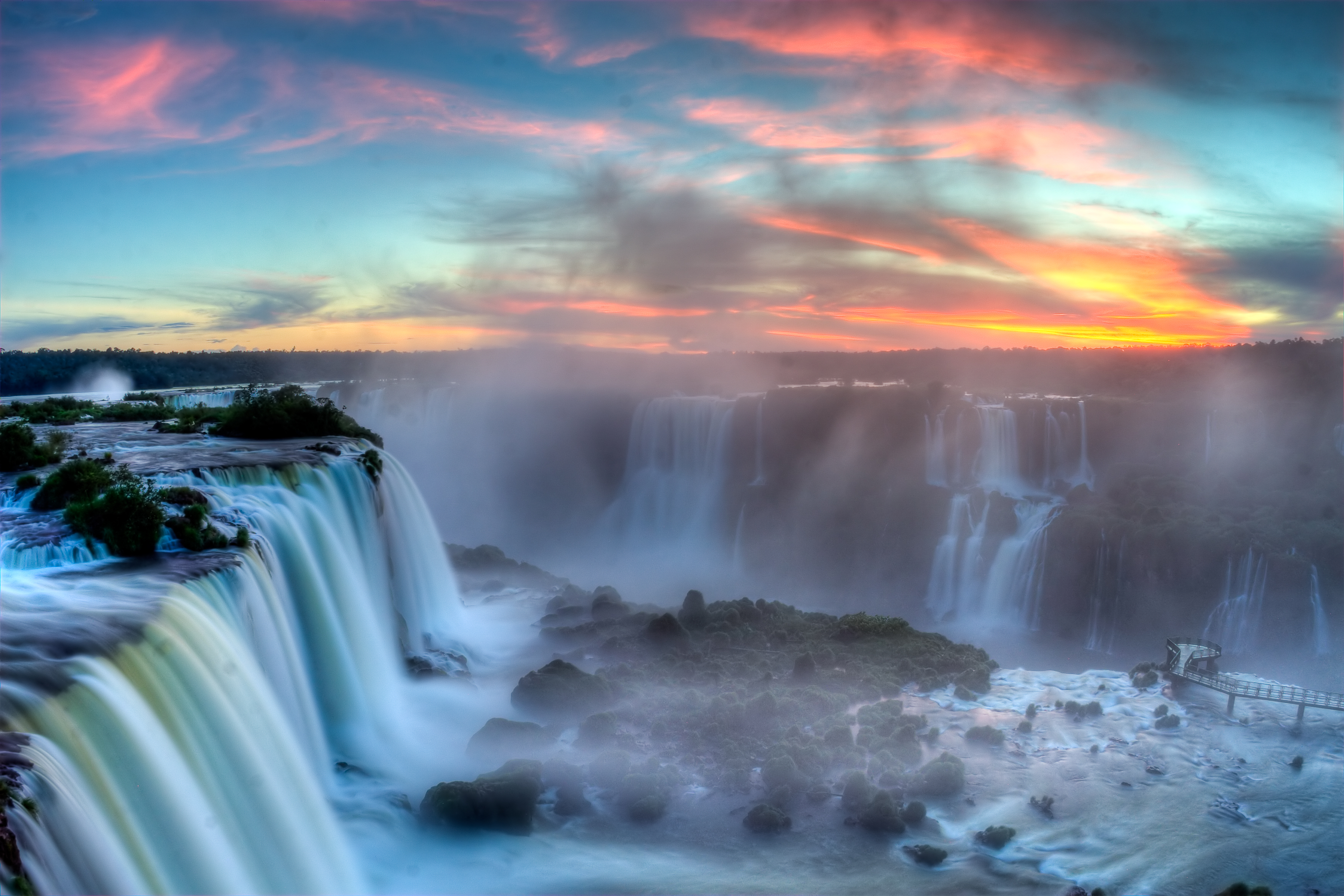
Foz do Iguaçu National Park.

The climate of Foz do Iguaçu is humid subtropical, with two distinctive seasons; one humid and hot in the summer and another, dry and cold, in the winter. The city's annual average temperature is 23.8 °C (74.8 °F), but can be as high as 40 °C (104 °F) in the summer (highest) or as low as -5 °C (23 °F) in the winter (lowest). The average in the summer is 26.5 °C (79.7 °F) and in the winter 15.4 °C (59.6 °F).

The climate of the city is hot or warm throughout the year, due to the relatively low altitude (standing only 173 m, 567 ft (173 m), above sea level).

Generally, the city is sunny during the year, but rain is fairly common during the spring and in the summer. The weather of the city, however, changes very constantly, because the region where the city stands is the zone where frequently three fronts meet. As consequence, it is not uncommon to see temperatures as high as 35 °C (95 °F) and in the summer as low as 8 °C (46 °F) in the city and frequent thunderstorms.

Climate data for Foz do Iguaçu
Month	Jan	Feb	Mar	Apr	May	Jun	Jul	Aug	Sep	Oct	Nov	Dec	Year
Record high °C (°F)	40.0 (104.0)	40.0 (104.0)	38.8 (101.8)	36.8 (98.2)	36.0 (96.8)	32.0 (89.6)	31.3 (88.3)	35.0 (95.0)	36.8 (98.2)	39.0 (102.2)	38.6 (101.5)	39.4 (102.9)	40.0 (104.0)
Mean daily maximum °C (°F)	33.0 (91.4)	32.6 (90.7)	31.1 (88.0)	28.2 (82.8)	25.2 (77.4)	23.1 (73.6)	23.7 (74.7)	25.3 (77.5)	26.9 (80.4)	28.8 (83.8)	31.0 (87.8)	32.6 (90.7)	28.5 (83.3)
Daily mean °C (°F)	25.5 (77.9)	25.4 (77.7)	23.8 (74.8)	20.8 (69.4)	17.7 (63.9)	15.8 (60.4)	15.7 (60.3)	17.5 (63.5)	19.0 (66.2)	21.4 (70.5)	23.1 (73.6)	25.1 (77.2)	20.9 (69.6)
Mean daily minimum °C (°F)	19.6 (67.3)	20.0 (68.0)	18.4 (65.1)	15.4 (59.7)	12.2 (54.0)	10.4 (50.7)	9.7 (49.5)	11.3 (52.3)	13.5 (56.3)	15.3 (59.5)	16.5 (61.7)	18.6 (65.5)	15.1 (59.2)
Record low °C (°F)	9.2 (48.6)	6.8 (44.2)	5.2 (41.4)	3.0 (37.4)	−1.0 (30.2)	−3.1 (26.4)	−4.2 (24.4)	0.0 (32.0)	1.0 (33.8)	5.0 (41.0)	6.3 (43.3)	3.8 (38.8)	−4.2 (24.4)
Average precipitation mm (inches)	196.0 (7.72)	180.1 (7.09)	174.8 (6.88)	151.0 (5.94)	127.6 (5.02)	138.3 (5.44)	84.4 (3.32)	107.4 (4.23)	146.6 (5.77)	219.8 (8.65)	153.7 (6.05)	189.0 (7.44)	1,868.7 (73.57)
Average precipitation days (≥ 1.0 mm)	9	9	8	8	6	8	6	8	8	9	7	9	95
Average relative humidity (%)	77	80	82	85	86	85	83	80	79	78	75	74	80.3
Mean monthly sunshine hours	230.5	196.3	209.9	193.6	180.8	151.2	168.7	157.9	146.4	195.6	231.4	232.3	2,294.6
Source: INMET

== History ==
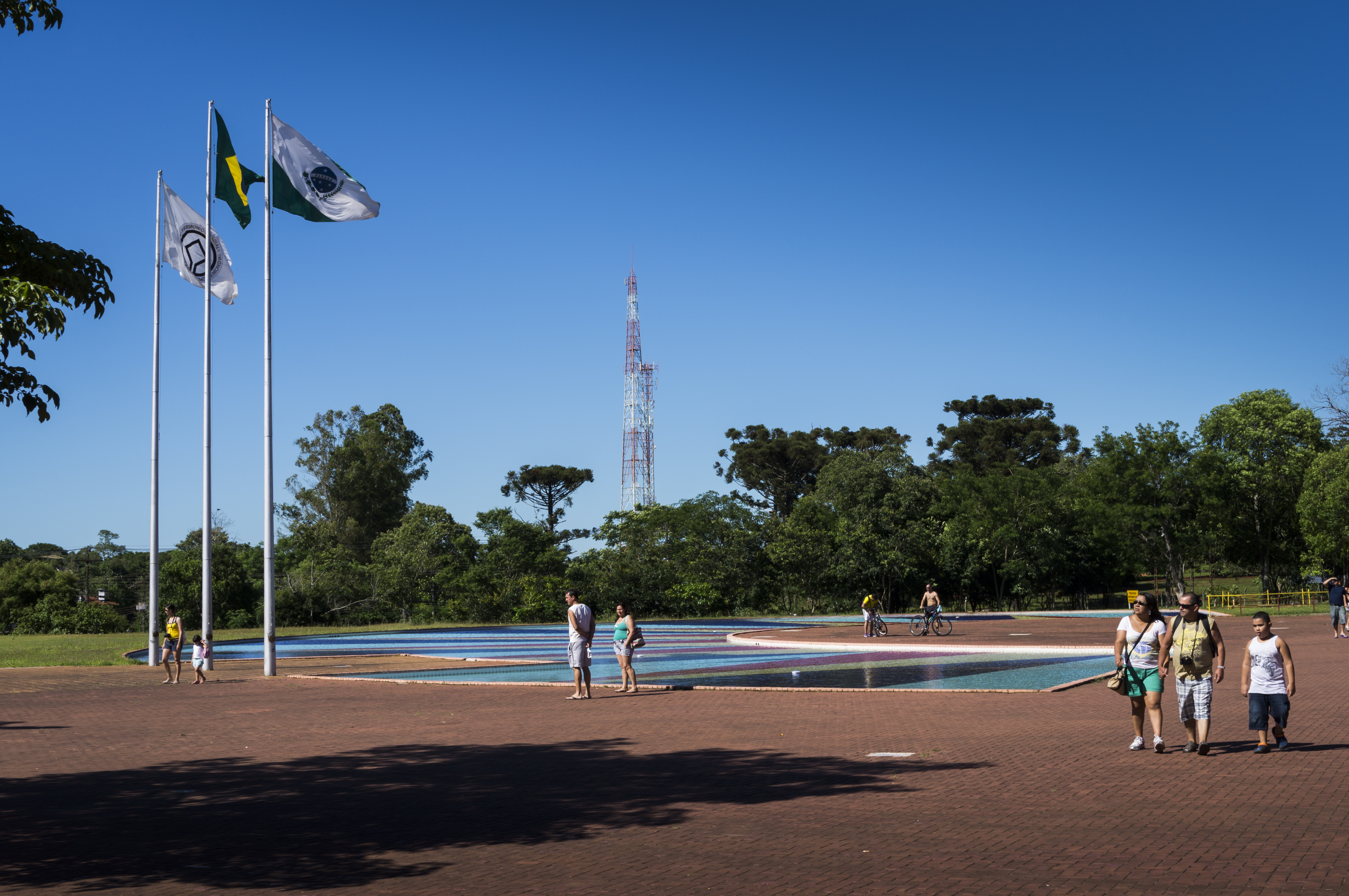
Flags in Iguaçu National Park

In 1549, a Spanish explorer, Cabeza de Vaca, found the falls while travelling down the river. Very impressed, he named them "Quedas de Santa Maria". Later the name changed to Quedas del Iguazú; which was derived from the native name of the local Guarani Indians.

Until 1860, it was under the disputed territory between Brazil and Paraguay, but given the latter's defeat in the Paraguayan War, the falls were recognized as part of the Brazilian territory.

In 1910, the colony's status was upgraded to the position of "vila" (town or village), named "Vila Iguazú", and, in 1914, to city. At that time, the city was known as Foz do Iguassú.

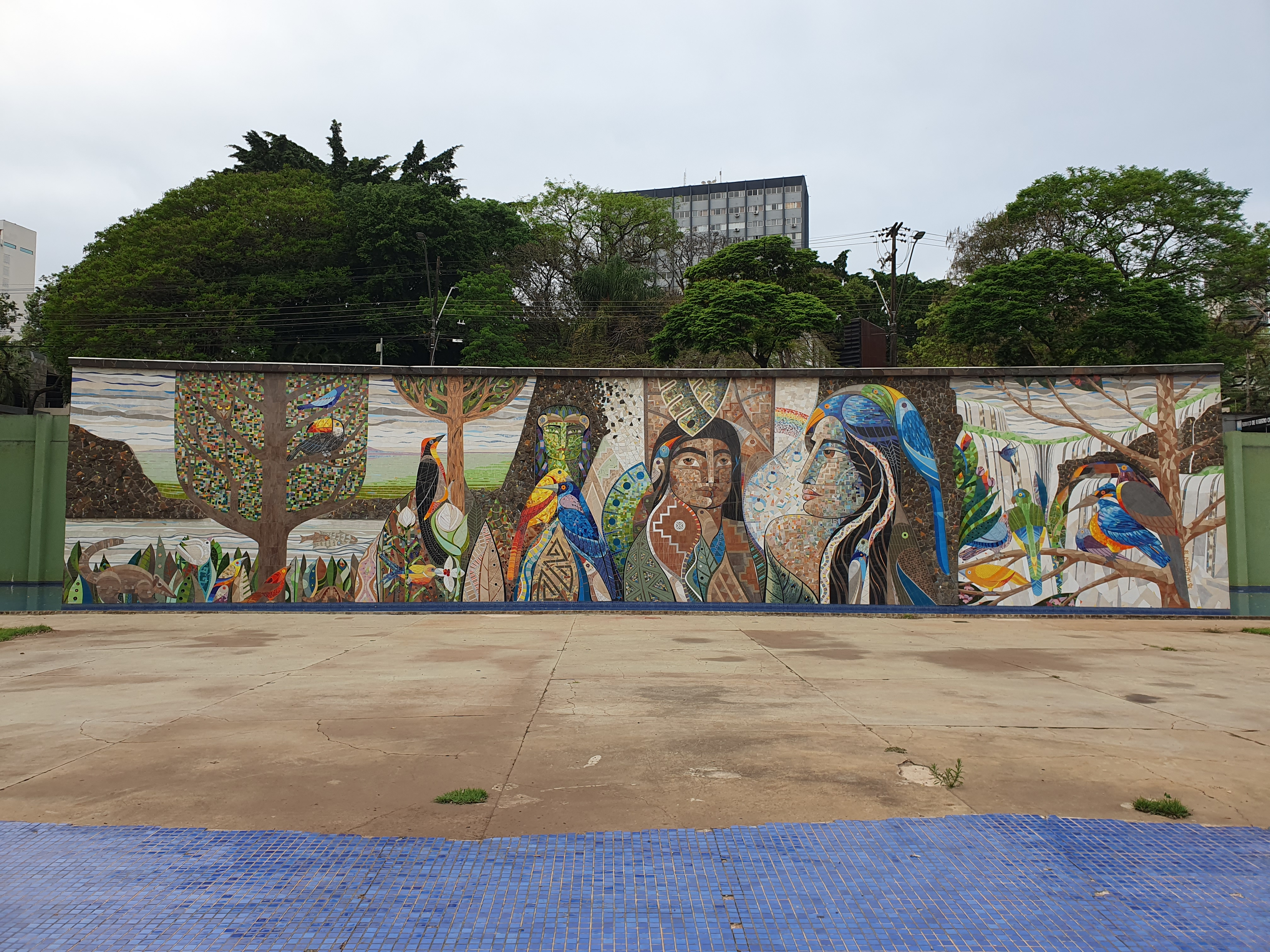
Mural The Legend of the Falls commissioned in 2018 to Miguel Hacher

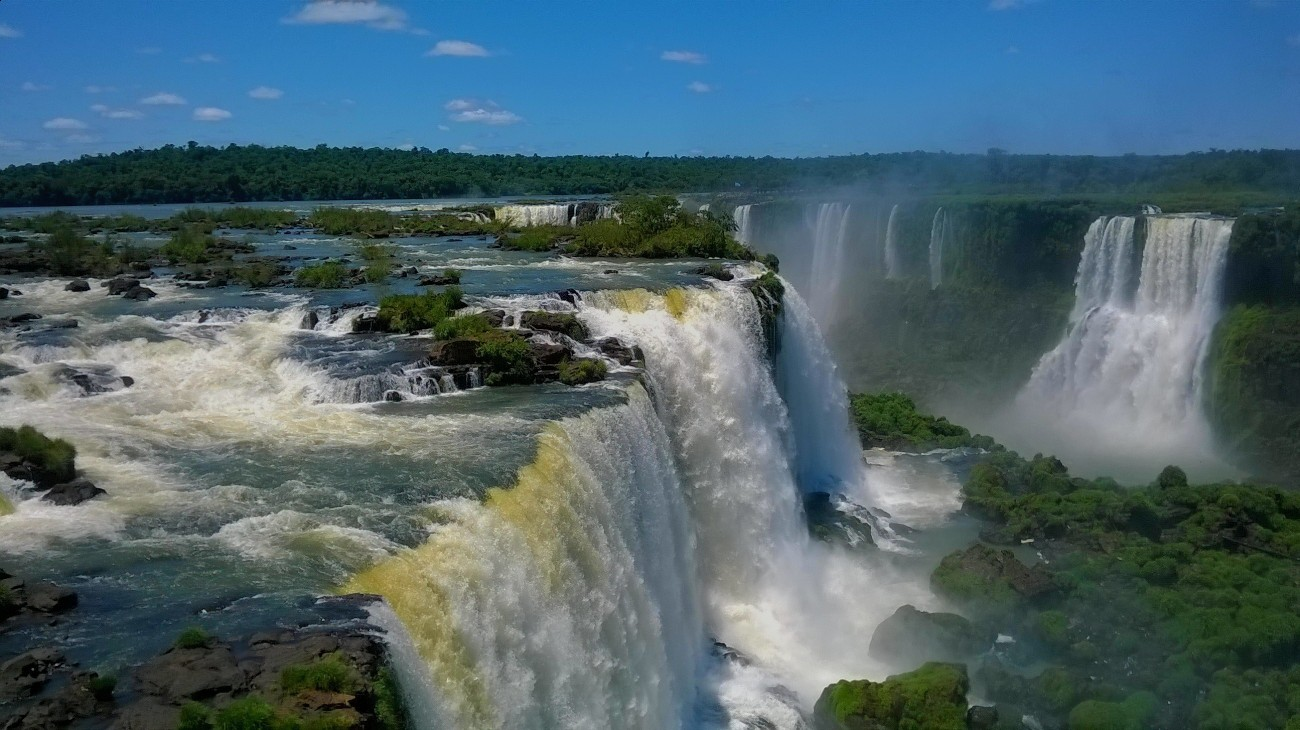
Aerial view of Iguaçu falls

In 1916, Alberto Santos-Dumont visited the region and, impressed with the beauty of the region, suggested more attention of the government to the area and asked for the appropriation of the land where currently is the Parque do Iguaçu (Iguaçu Park). Until 1917, this region had an owner, Jezus Val. The state appropriated the land in the next year, and, in 1939, the Parque Nacional do Iguaçu ("Iguaçu National Park") was created.

The city experienced a big economical boom in the 1960s to the late 1980s, first with the construction of the Friendship Bridge, concluded in 1965, and the Itaipu Dam, in operation since in 1984.

=== Spelling of the name ===
In 1945, an agreement between the Brazilian Academy of Letters and the academy of Lisbon changed the spelling of the city name to Foz do Iguaçu.

On 19 October 2005, a proposal was made to revert the spelling of the city name to Foz do Iguassú. The proposal was approved in a first debate at the Town Hall and then rejected in a second debate, by four votes for and eight against.

The purpose of the adjustment to the city name was to return the spelling to the original form, as at the foundation of the city in 1914. The change occurred due language reforms of 1945, which changed the orthography of Brazilian Portuguese. However, existing proper names were not obliged to change. Another reason for the proposed adjustment back to the original was that 146 of the 198 member countries of the United Nations do not have the "ç" character in their alphabets.

The adjustment would therefore rationalise any search for the city in search engines, since Foz do Iguaçu's is more widely known for the falls, which are known as the Iguassú Falls. The City councillor proponent of the bill, Djalma Pastorello, felt that tourism to the city of Foz do Iguaçu would improve greatly by a clarification of its association with the now-famous Iguassu Falls. However, he estimated that 70% of the city's population were against the name change because the local media anticipated the change and presented it in a distorted way, so that locals were unable to see that the intention was to benefit the population.

The same word is spelled Iguazú in Spanish and Yguasu in Guarani.

=== Literature ===
The region that today is part of Foz do Iguaçu, is described by Álvar Núñez Cabeza de Vaca in his diary that narrates the very experience at the beginning of the European colonization in the Americas. In contemporary literature one of the city's neighborhoods appears in a subjective way in the work of the writer Leonid R. Bózio, who reports in the book Tempos Sombrios, from the series Autofagia, local mysticism through the figure of Pombero, a creature from Guarani mythology.

== Crime ==
With the border of Brazil, Paraguay and Argentina being one the world's largest drug trafficking points, the city of Foz do Iguaçu experiences a large circulation of smuggled goods, cars and weapons, which generates several social problems, especially violence, resulting in a very high homicide rate relative to the population. The city leads the ranking of adolescent homicides in the country. Apart from being one of the most violent cities in southern Brazil, it is also one of Brazil's most violent cities. The largest favela in the state of Paraná is located in the city, in the Porto Meira neighborhood.

== Demographics ==
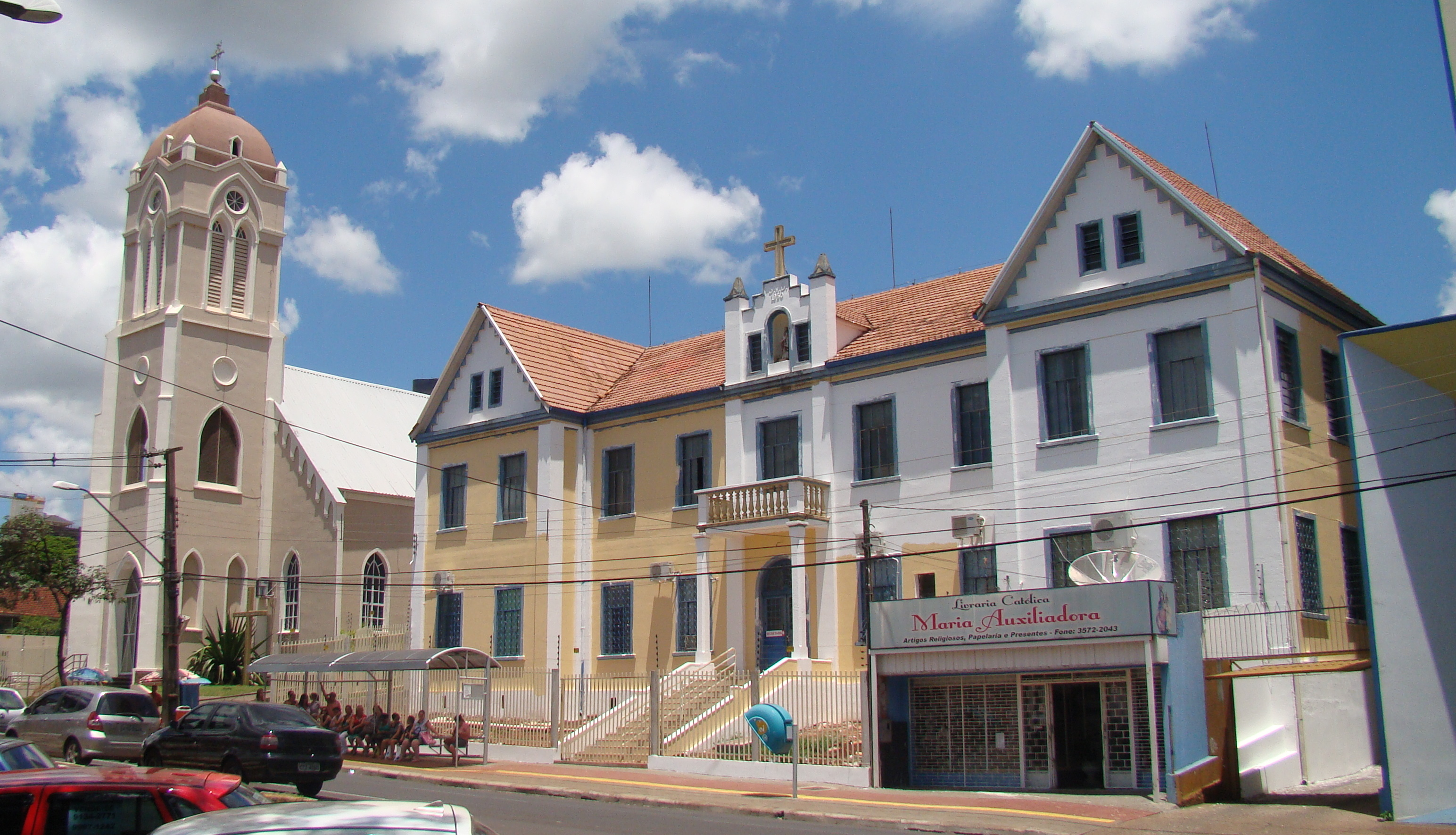
Church of St. John the Baptist, former Roman-Catholic Cathedral

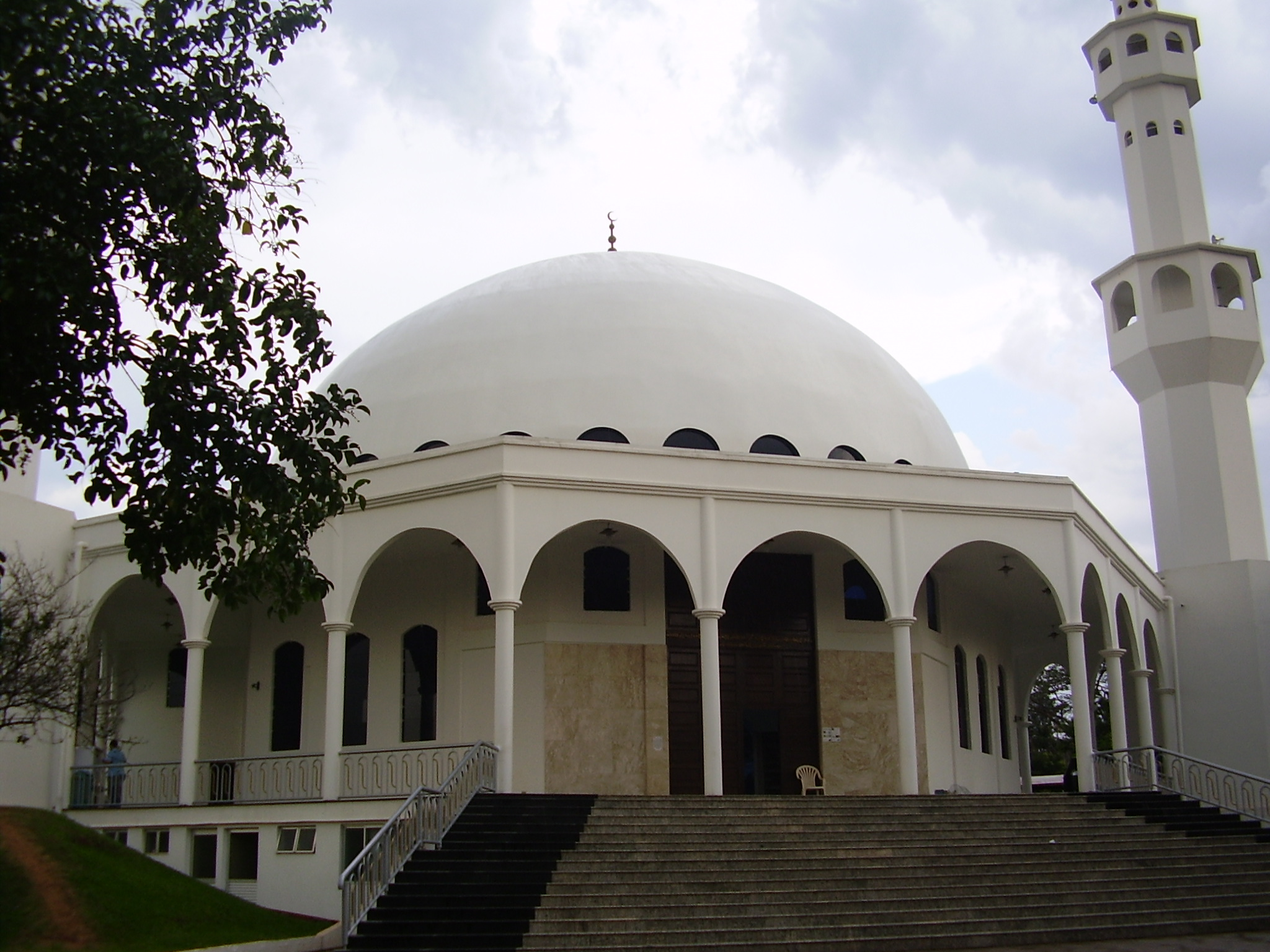
Mosque Omar Ibn Al-Khatab

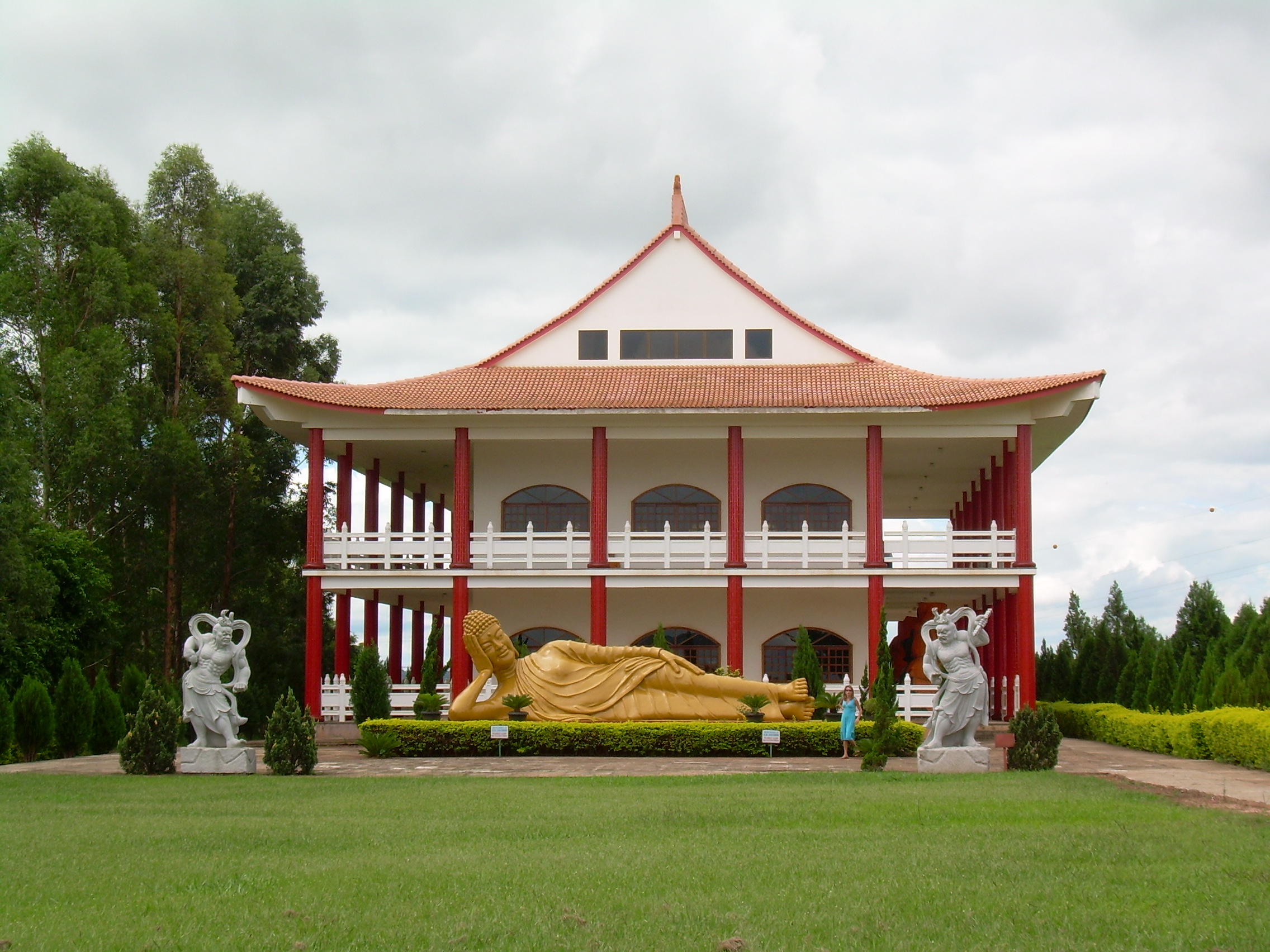
Buddhist Temple of Foz do Iguaçu

The city has a population of approximately 265,000, whilst the Triple Frontier region (the metropolitan areas of Foz do Iguaçu, Brazil; Ciudad del Este, Paraguay; and Puerto Iguazú, Argentina) has a population of close to 1 million. The city's population is heterogeneous, with immigrant communities from many parts of the world, such as Arabs (mostly from Lebanon or Syria), Asians (mostly of Chinese, Japanese, and Korean descent), Europeans (mostly Germans, Italians, French, Swedes, Portuguese, Poles, and Ukrainians), and other Central and South Americans (mostly Paraguayans and Argentines with some Haitians, with UNILA attracting students from all over the Americas).

The residents are predominantly Roman Catholic but there is a relatively large minority of Muslims and Buddhists. The city has a large mosque and a Buddhist temple.

Fenartec is an annual event held in May to commemorate the city's multicultural diversity.

Race makeup	%
White	67.9%
Mixed	26.2%
Asian	2.8%
Black	2.6%
Amerindian	0.5%

Source: Paranaense Institute for Economic and Social Development (2014)

=== Arab influence ===
Since 1940, Lebanese and other Arabs have settled in the southwestern city of Foz do Iguaçu, in the "Triple Border" area where Paraguay, Argentina and Brazil converge in a region of loosely controlled borders.

People of Lebanese heritage constitute around 90% of the population from Middle East in the city, with others from Egypt, Iraq, Jordan, Kuwait, Syria and Palestine.

== Transportation ==
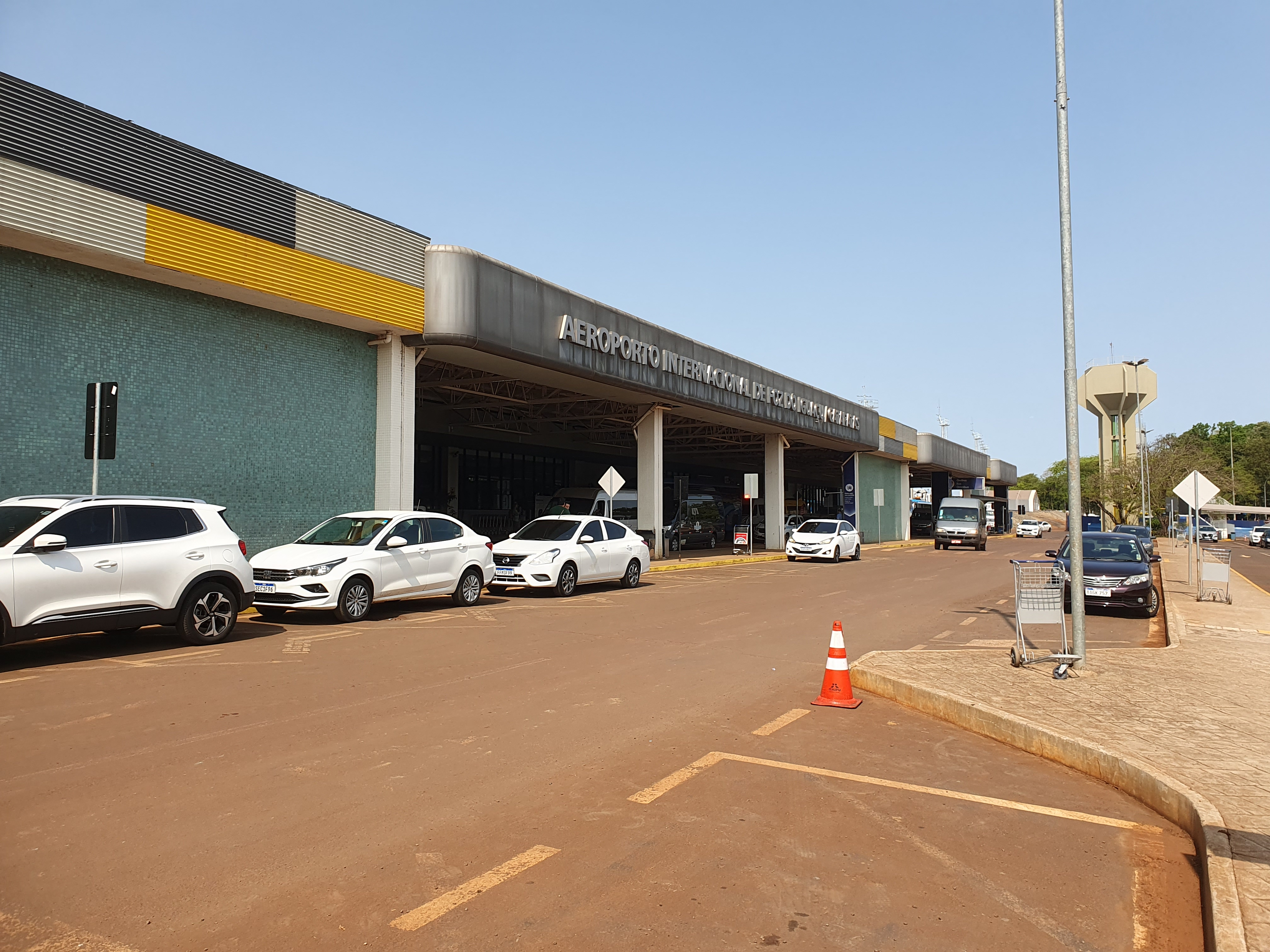
Foz do Iguaçu International Airport, terminal land side

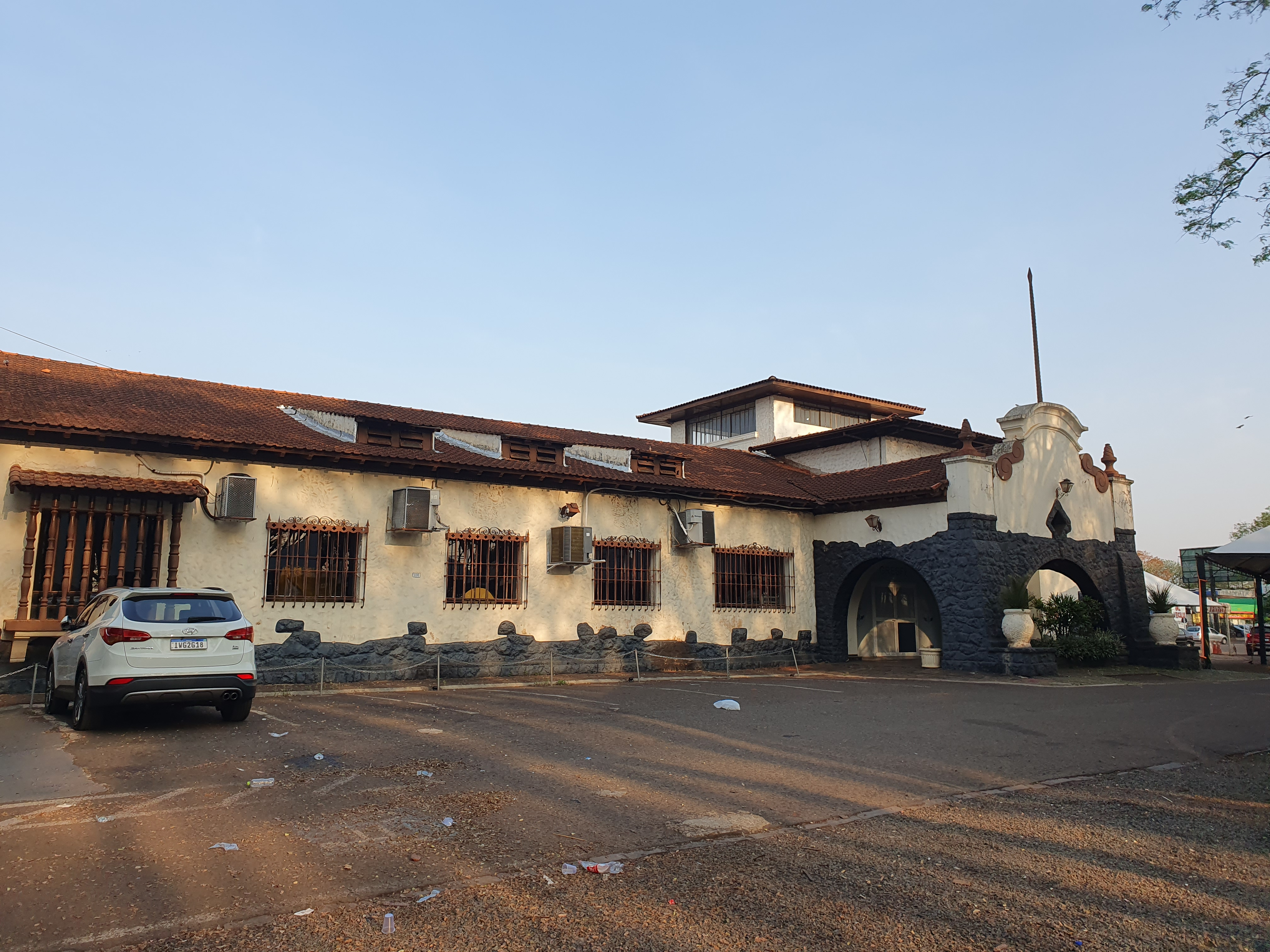
Defunct terminal of Iguassú National Park Airport. It is now a protected building, part of the GRESFI Club

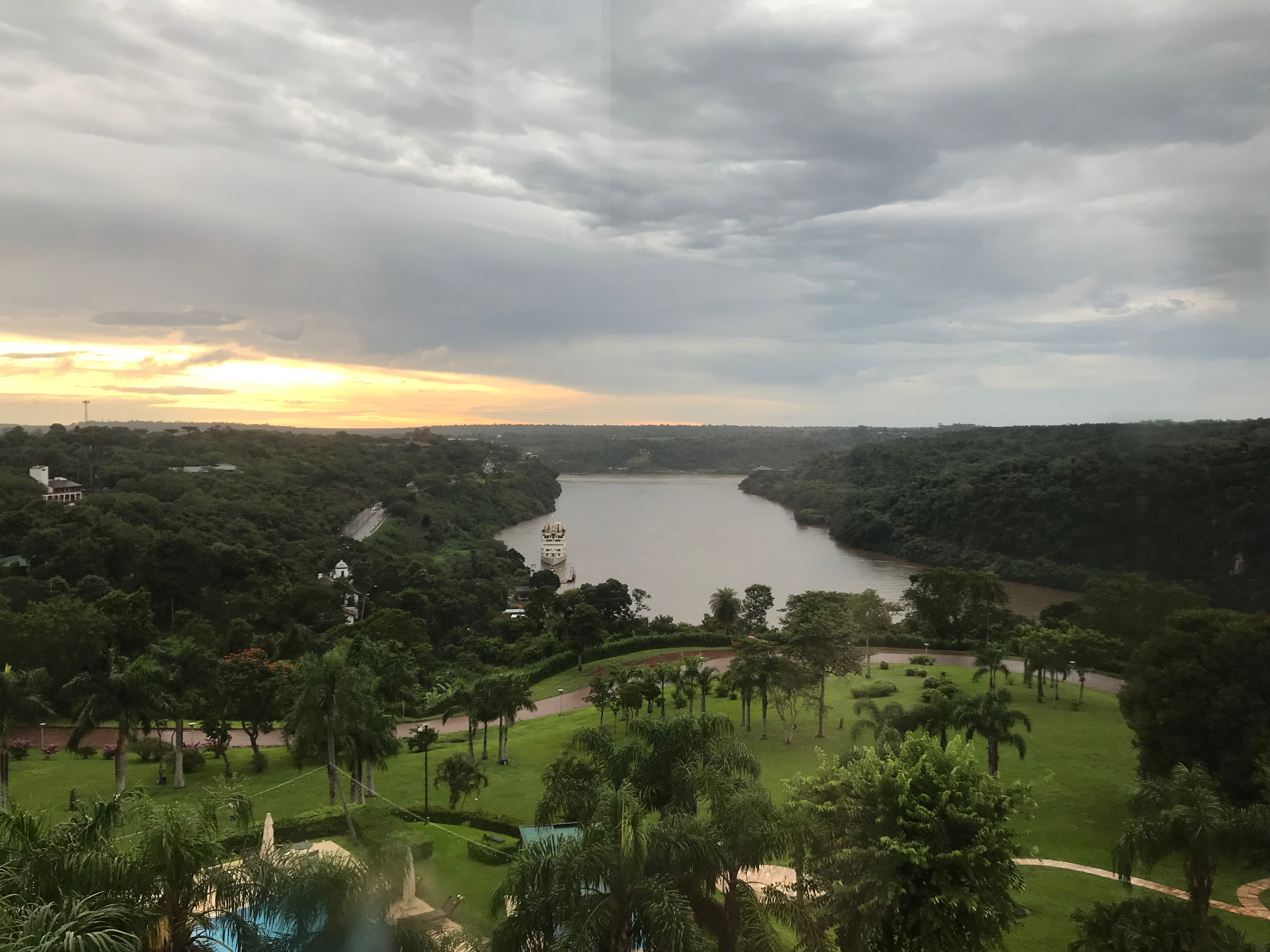
Tri-border area between Brazil, Paraguay and Argentina.

Foz do Iguaçu is connected to the east by the BR-277, to Paranaguá, and to the west by the Friendship Bridge to Ciudad del Este, and to the south to Puerto Iguazú by the Fraternity Bridge. Both the BR-277 and the Friendship Bridge are very busy roads, linking Paraguay to the Paranaguá's seaport.

The city is served by Foz do Iguaçu/Cataratas International Airport. Nearby options are Cataratas del Iguazú International Airport in Puerto Iguazú, Argentina and Guaraní International Airport in Ciudad del Este, Paraguay.

=== Public transport ===
The city does not operate its own municipal transport networks, but instead licenses four private bus companies to operate services on its behalf. The bus fares are set by the municipality for all four companies. In 2003, the city initiated an integrated city fare and created a hub near the city centre.

Now, most of the bus routes pass through this hub and passengers pay a standard fare within the city zone, which enables them to transfer routes, even when these may be operated by another company.

The transport network extends to certain distant areas, such as the city's airport and the Iguazu Park, but not between the city and its neighbor Ciudad del Este, nor with Puerto Iguazú, which are serviced by other companies. These routes are not part of the integrated network, a situation reflected by higher fares.

=== Avenida Brasil (Brazil Avenue) ===
Since Foz do Iguaçu's foundation, Brazil Avenue is the city's main road. While during its early years the street was primarily the military headquarters' location (now they are just in the right beginning of the Avenue), nowadays the street is a very active place where many retail stores are located. It is located at the downtown of the city and it is 5 km (3 mi) long (of which 3 km, 2 mi (3.2 km), is arterial road).

As of 2004, the prefecture of the city decided that a major revitalization of "Avenida Brasil" (Brazil Avenue) was needed. Attracting many consumers from many different areas of the city and even from its neighbours Ciudad del Este and Puerto Iguazú, the avenue, wide enough only to support two cars side-by-side, is frequently used during business days, and even more in important holidays (Christmas, Children's day, Easter, Mother's day), with many cars competing for a parking space.

The revitalization proposals asks for removal of parking space, giving major attention to pedestrians. Also, the avenue would be wide enough only to support one car side by side. The project started at the end of 2004, and by 2006 was completed. The avenue does not have a bus route, by municipal order.

Nowadays, the Brazil Avenue, in downtown Foz do Iguaçu, is full of homeless people.

== Education ==
The city has a literacy rate of 95.5%, with most children attending public or private schools. Public education has been a priority of the municipality of the city and the government of the state of Paraná; however, most middle and upper-class families continue to send their children to elite private schools.

The city has approximately 30 private schools and approximately 120 public schools (including daycare and kindergarten schools). In addition, there are 7 universities:

- Cesufoz;
- UDC;
- Uniamérica;
- Unifoz;
- Unioeste;
- Anglo-Americano Faculdades;
- IFPR (Technical Institute).

In January 2010, the Universidade Federal da Integração Latino-Americana (UNILA) was founded.

== Tourism ==
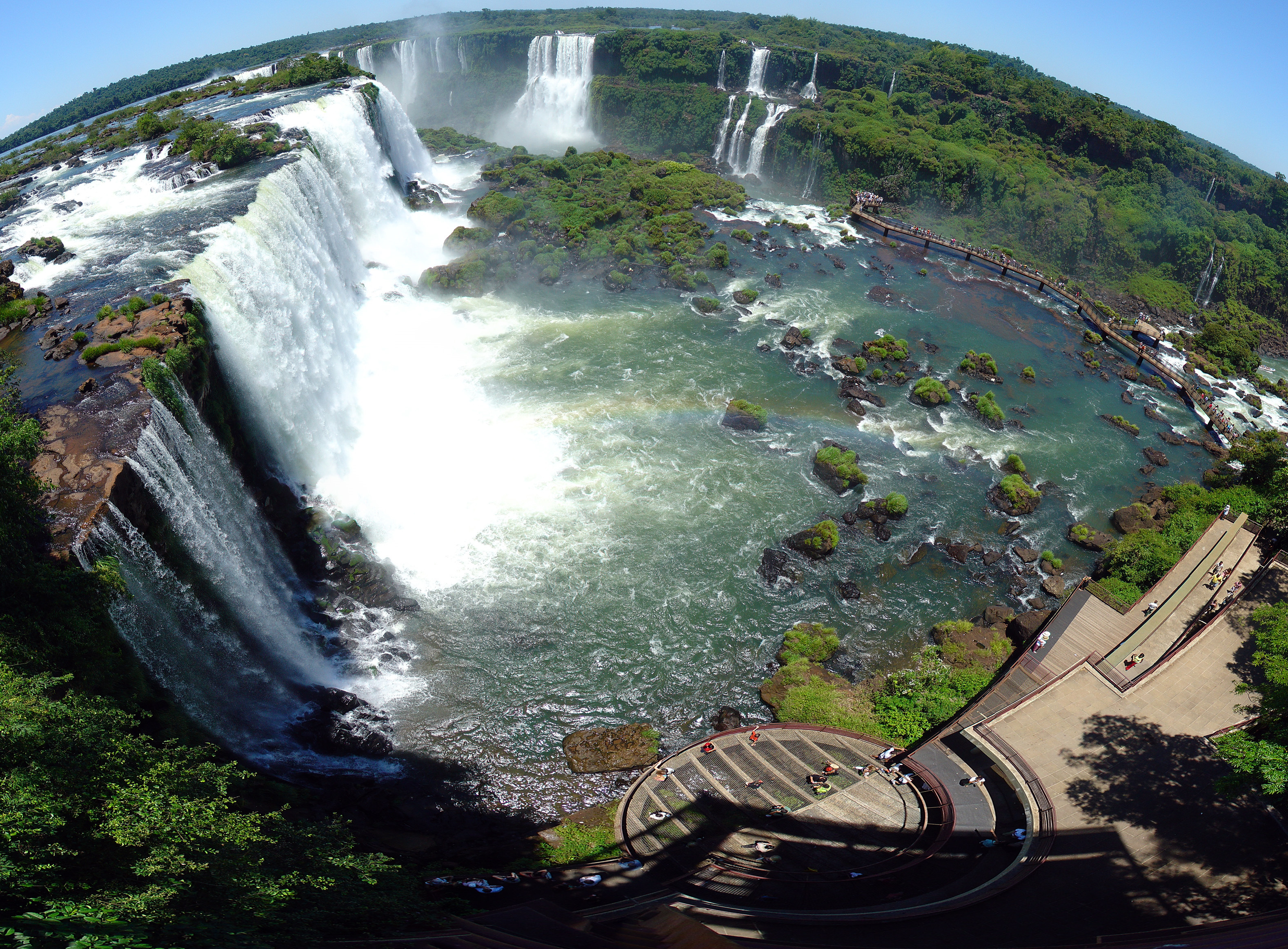
Iguaçu falls

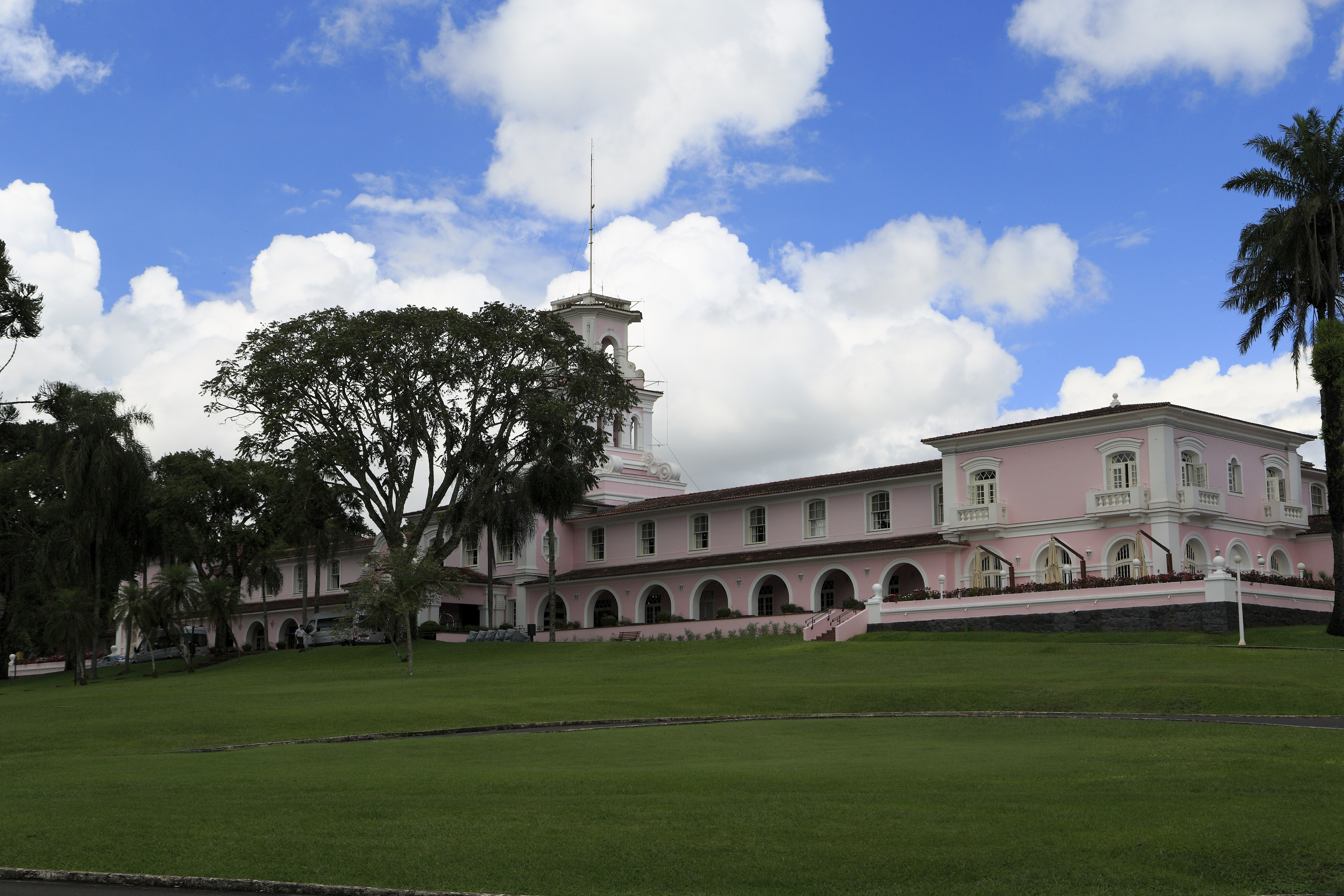
Cataratas Hotel in Iguaçu National Park

The city is one of Brazil's most-frequented tourist destinations. Most tourists are Brazilians and Argentines. The city has about 100 hotels and inns. Its main attractions are:

- Iguaçu Falls, which has a flow capacity equal to three times that of Niagara Falls. Part of the falls are on the Brazilian side. Others are on the Argentine side. "Devil's Throat" ("Garganta do Diabo" in Portuguese) is the tallest of the falls, which is 97 m (318 ft) high;
- Parque Nacional do Iguaçu (Iguaçu National Park), in both Brazil and Argentina, where the falls are. It is protected by the IBAMA. Attractions include also Macuco Safari river rafting and Poço Preto Hike;
- Itaipu Dam, the first-largest generator of hydro-electric power in the world, in the Parana river, between Brazil and Paraguay. Both the plant and the Biological Reserve can be visited;
- The Tríplice Fronteira (Triple Frontier) location where Brazil, Argentina and Paraguay meet. Each side has its own Marco (landmark);
- The Omar Ibn Al-Khattab mosque, the largest in Latin America;
- The Bird Park (Parque das Aves), which features a collection of wild birds, and the "Bosque Guaraní" the city's zoo.

== Consular representations ==
The following countries have consular representations in Foz do Iguaçu:

- Argentina (Consulate)
- Paraguay (Consulate-General)
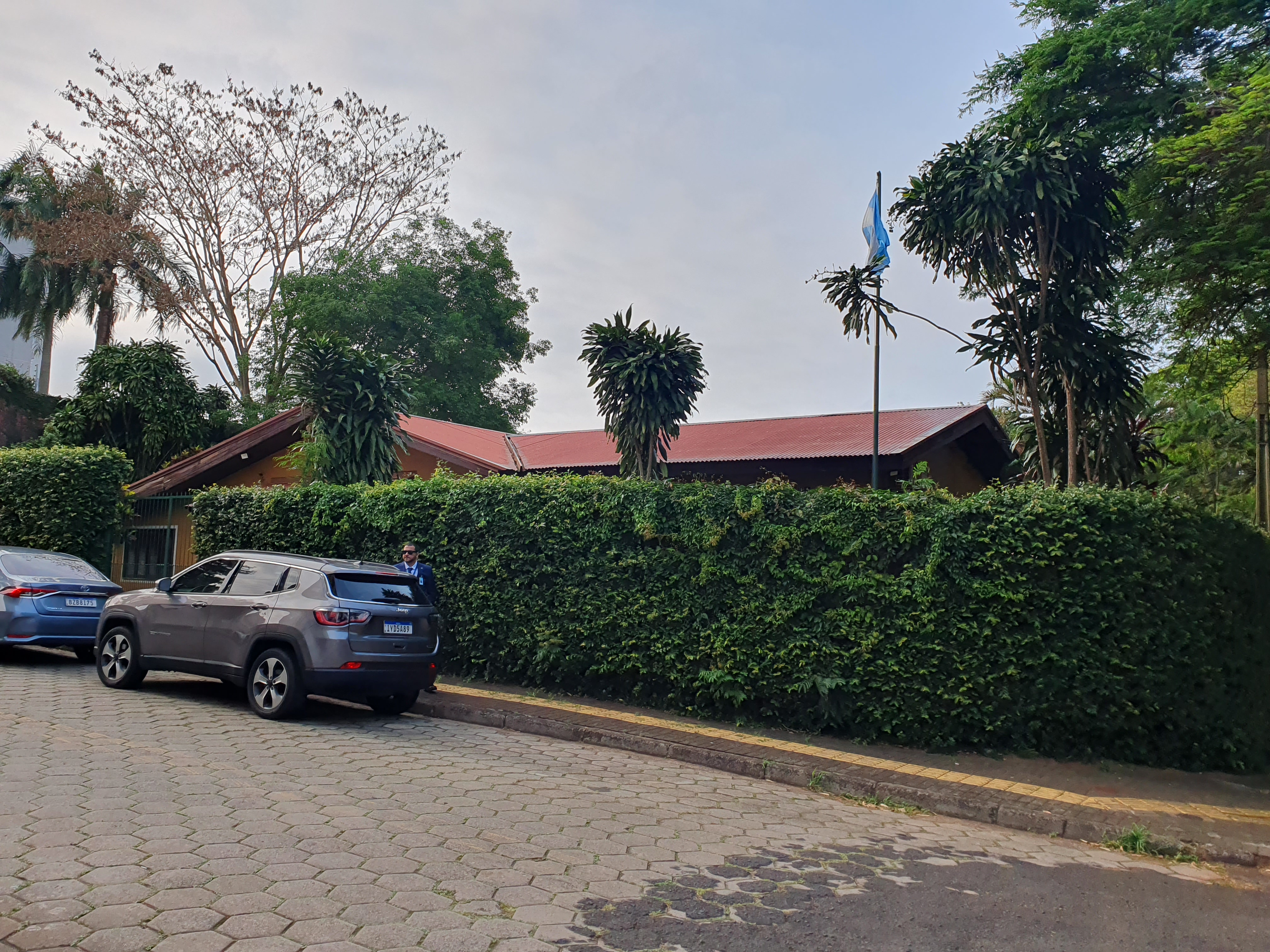
Consulate of Argentina

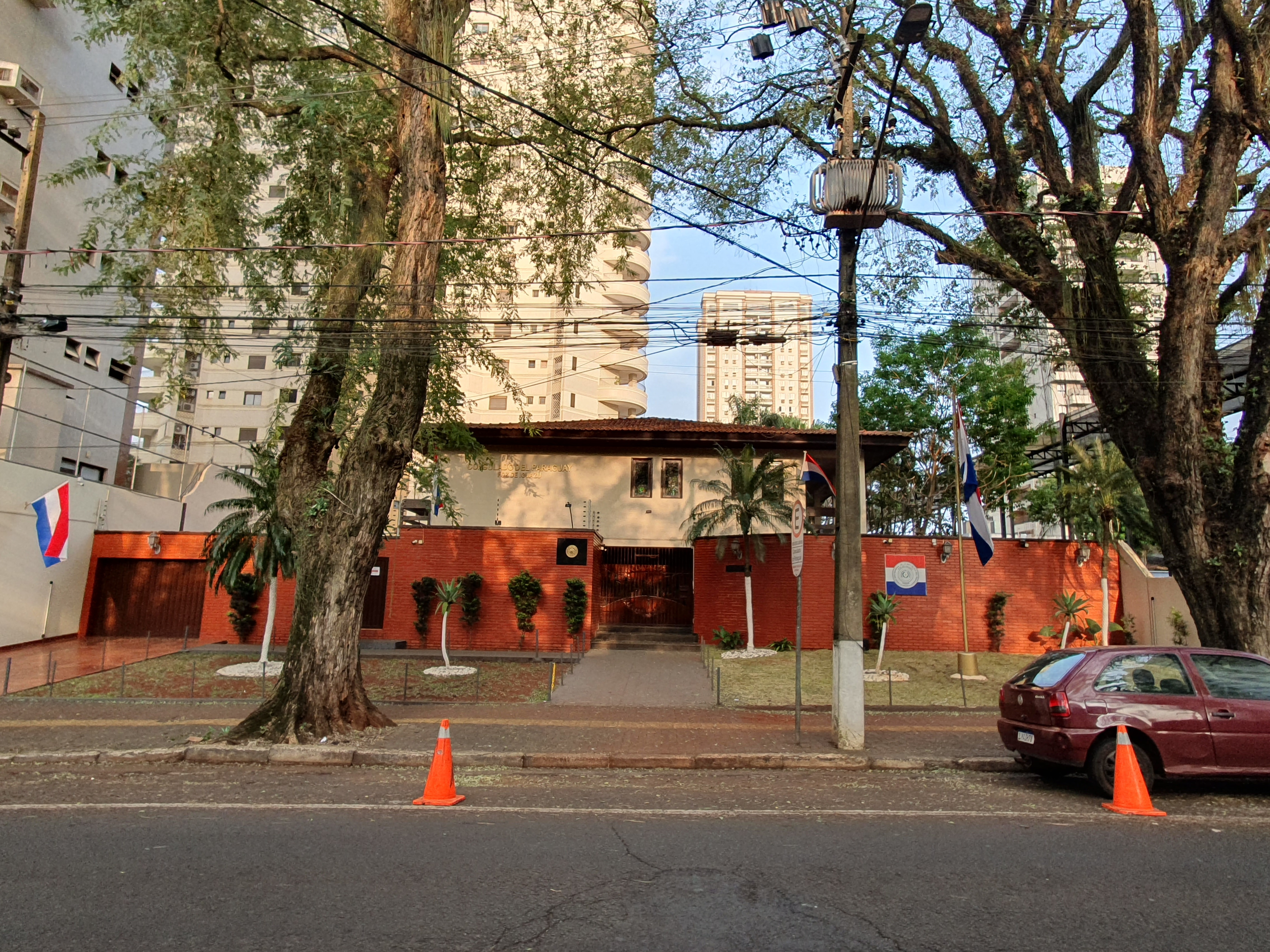
Consulate-General of Paraguay

== Sports ==
Foz do Iguaçu hosted an edition of the Summer X Games in 2013.

== Notable people ==
- Pepê, football player
- Fabiano Beltrame, football player
- Jean Silva, mixed martial artist

== See also ==
- Ciudad del Este
- Puerto Iguazú
- Itaipu Dam
- Argentina–Brazil border
- Brazil–Paraguay border
- List of cities in Brazil by population
