= Buddhist Temple of Foz do Iguaçu =

Coordinates: 25°28′28″S 54°35′58″W

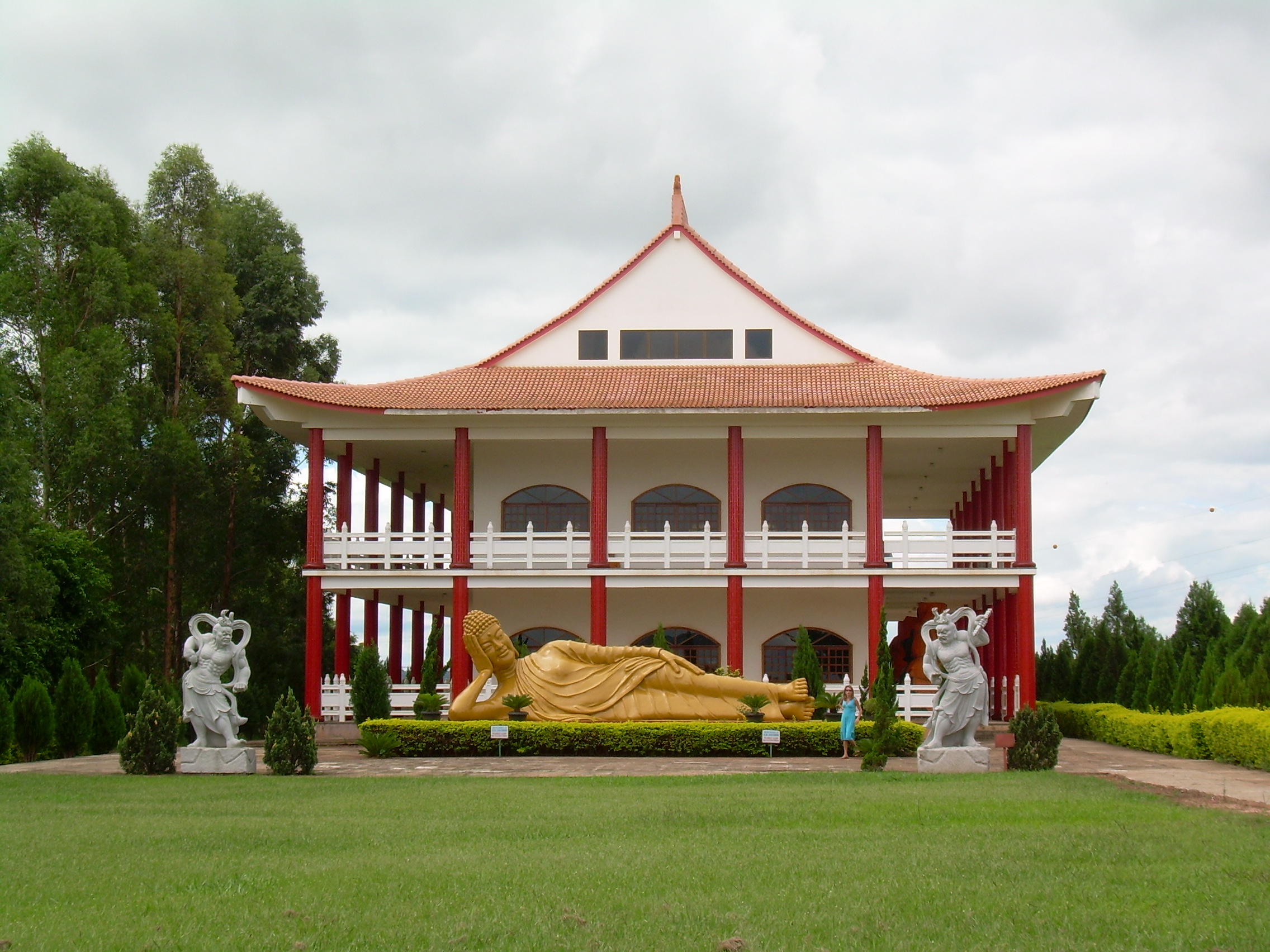
Buddhist temple Chen Tien

The Chen Tien Buddhist Temple in Foz do Iguaçu, Brazil, was built in 1996 by Chinese communities in the triple frontier region of Brazil, Paraguay, and Argentina. It is associated with the Pure Land school of Buddhism.

== Structure ==
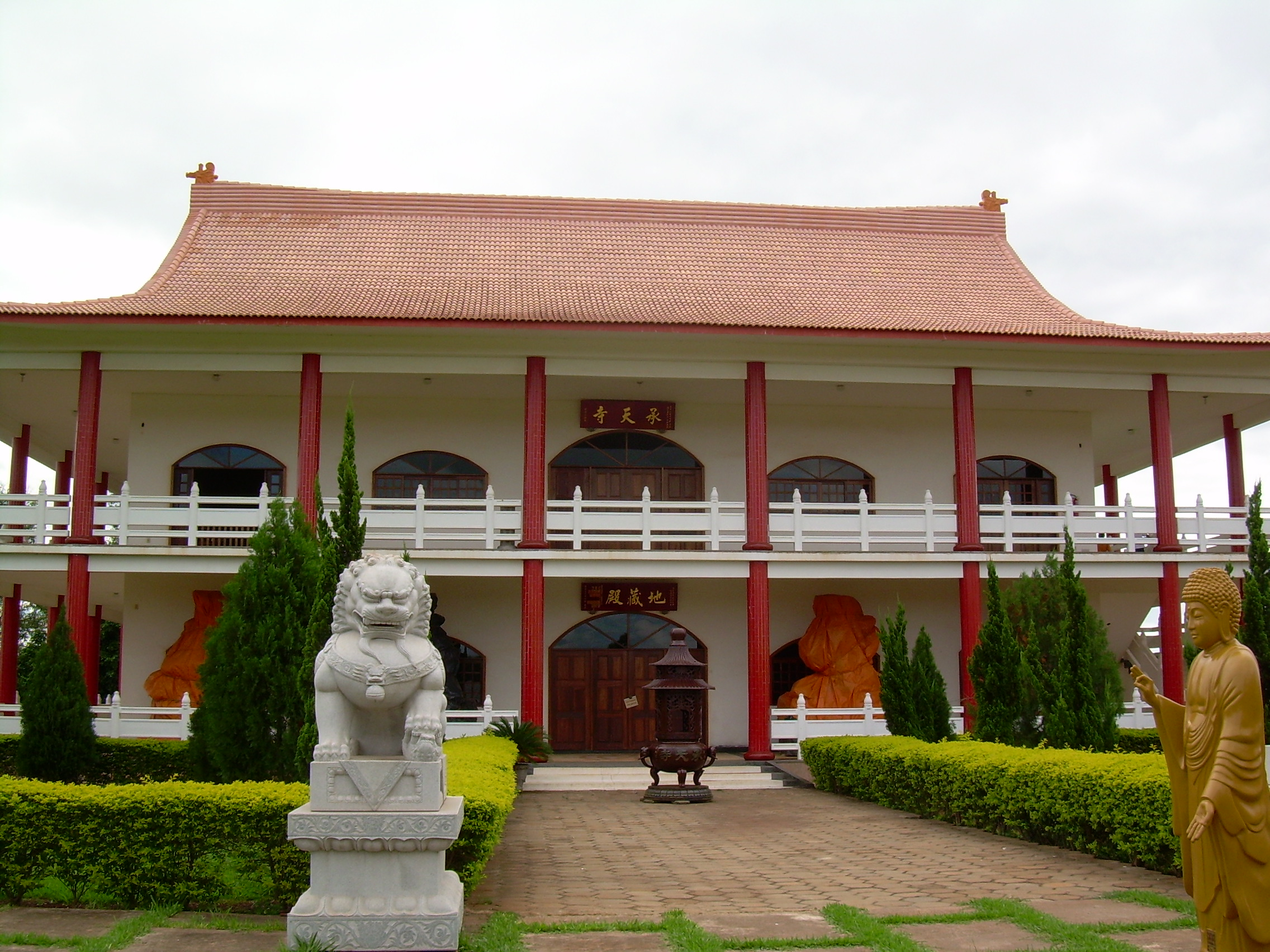
Temple seen from the side

The temple has over one hundred statues, with three large statues of Buddha including:

1. 7-meter tall replica of the famous seated Buddha Milè Pu-San (Maitreya)
2. A reclining Buddha Shakyamuni, representing the achievement of Parinirvana
3. A bronze statue of Amitābha, considered the highest rank by the temple.

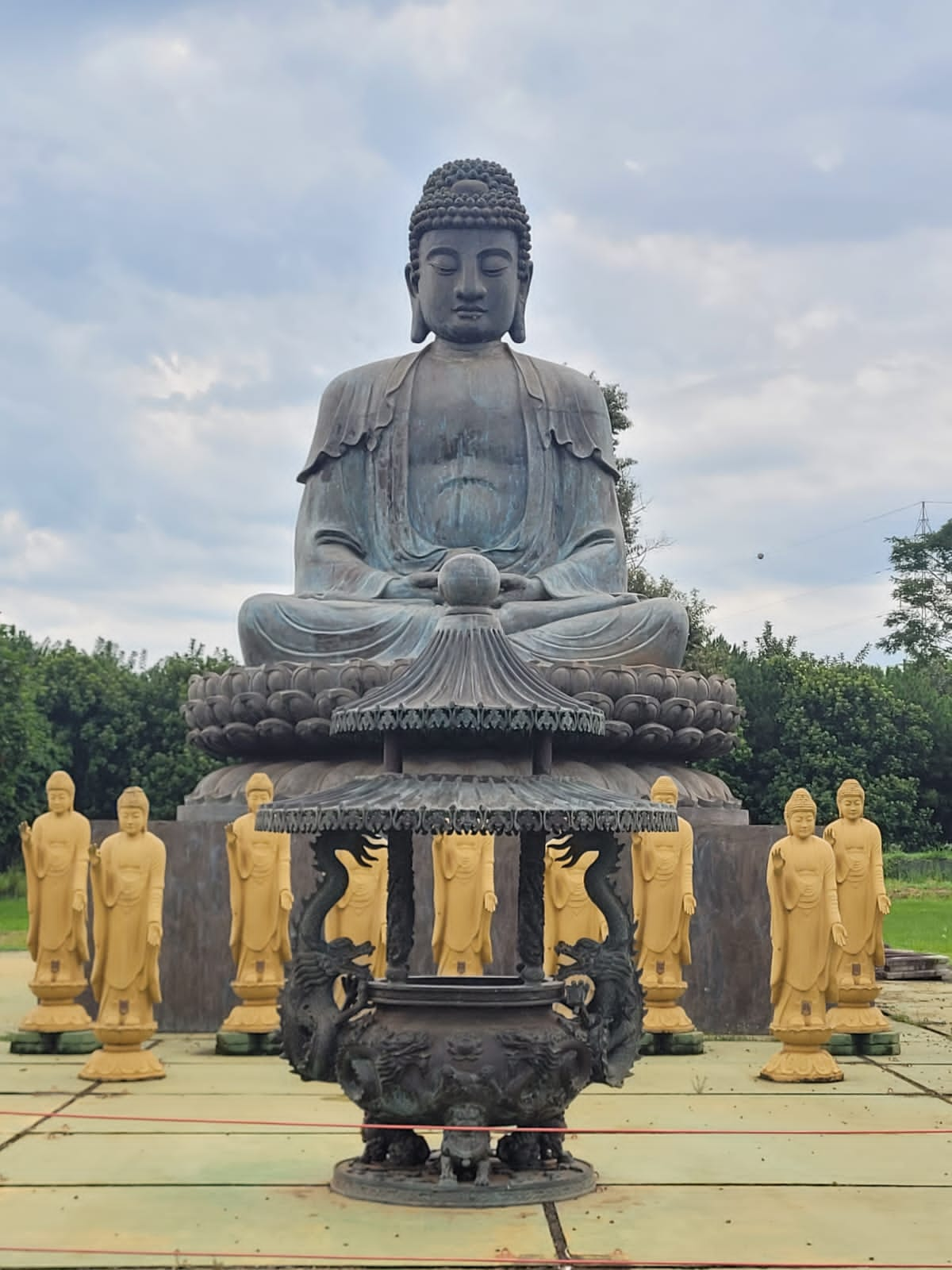
Buda Amituofo

There are also 120 statues representing each reincarnation of the Buddha on earth. The primary temple is more than 2000m² and two floors. The house of the master is on the second floor.

== Location ==
The Buddhist Temple accepts visitors from 9:30 to 16:30. Entrance is free and there is also free parking.
