= Foz do Iguaçu International Airport =

Airport serving Foz do Iguaçu, Brazil

Foz do Iguaçu/Cataratas International Airport Aeroporto Internacional de Foz do Iguaçu/Cataratas

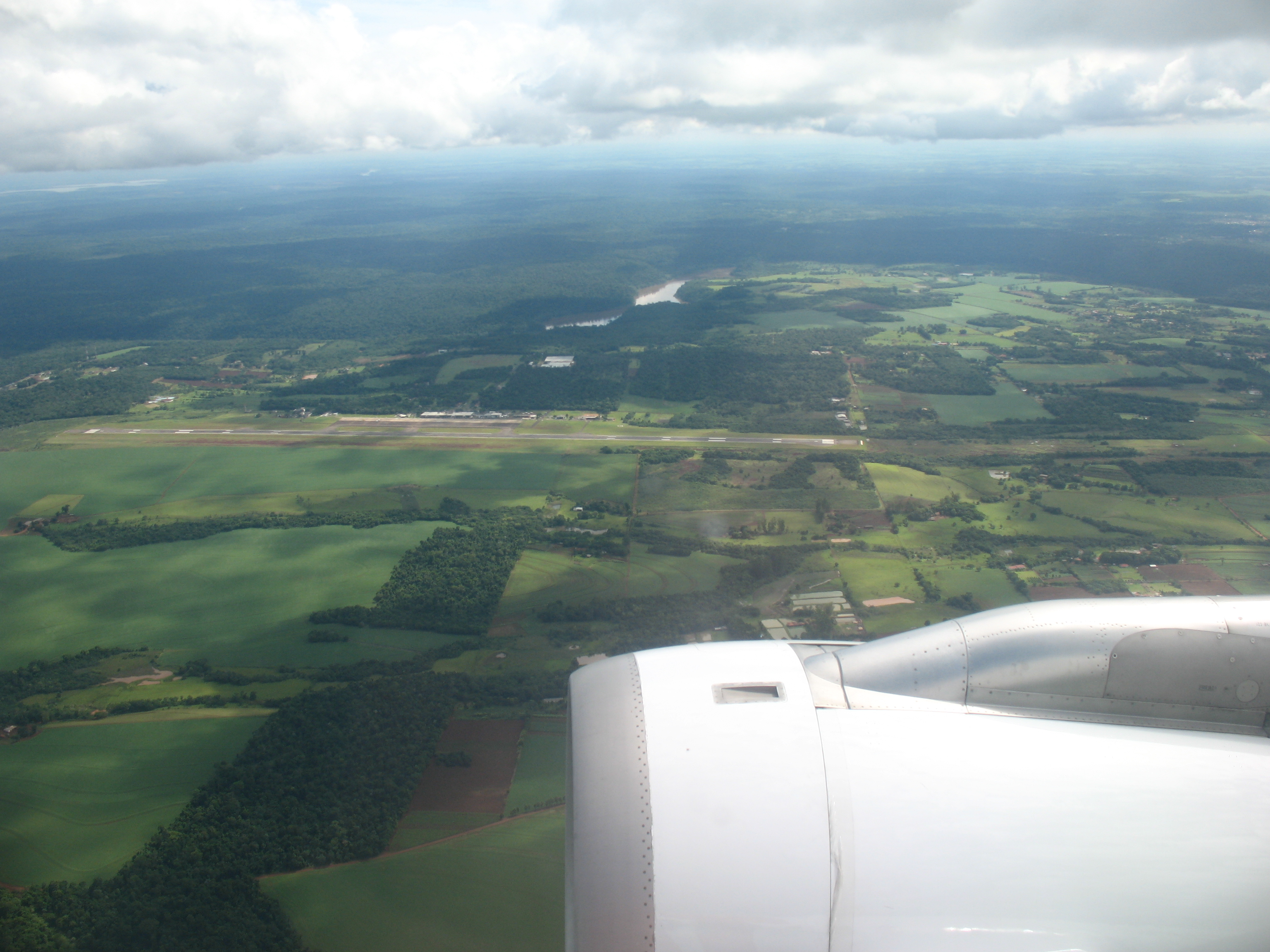
- IATA: IGU; ICAO: SBFI; LID: PR0002

Summary
- Airport type: Public
- Operator: Infraero (1974–2021); Motiva (2021–2026); ASUR (2026–present)
- Serves: Foz do Iguaçu
- Opened: 7 January 1974; 52 years ago
- Time zone: BRT (UTC−03:00)
- Elevation AMSL: 240 m (790 ft)
- Coordinates: 25°36′01″S 054°29′06″W
- Website: aeroportos.motiva.com.br/foz-do-iguacu-pr/

Map
- Location in Brazil IGU (Brazil)

Runways
Direction	Length		Surface
Direction	m	ft	Surface
15/33	2,705	8,875	Asphalt

Statistics (2025)
- Passengers: 2,274,784 ▲23%
- Aircraft Operations: 19,335 ▲15%
- Statistics: Motiva; Sources: Airport Website, ANAC, DECEA

Foz do Iguaçu/Cataratas International Airport (IATA: IGU, ICAO: SBFI), is the airport serving Foz do Iguaçu, Brazil. It is named after the Iguazu Falls (Portuguese: Cataratas do Iguaçu) and provides air-connections to the falls located at Iguaçu National Park, and to Itaipu Dam.

It is operated by ASUR.

== History ==
The airport was opened on January 7, 1974 replacing the older Iguassú National Park Airport, closer to downtown which was then closed.

Previously operated by Infraero, on April 7, 2021, CCR won a 30-year concession to operate the airport. On April 26, 2025 CCR was rebranded as Motiva.

On November 18, 2025 the entire airports portfolio of Motiva was sold to the Mexican airport operator ASUR. Motiva will cease to operate airports. The transaction was completed on August 31, 2026..

== Airlines and destinations ==
Airlines	Destinations
Azul Brazilian Airlines	Belo Horizonte–Confins, Campinas, Curitiba, São Paulo–Congonhas; Seasonal: Porto Alegre, Recife
Gol Linhas Aéreas	Fortaleza (ends 30 January 2027), Porto Alegre, Rio de Janeiro–Galeão, São Paulo–Congonhas, São Paulo–Guarulhos
JetSmart Chile	Seasonal: Santiago de Chile
LATAM Brasil	Brasília, Curitiba, Rio de Janeiro–Galeão, São Paulo–Congonhas, São Paulo–Guarulhos

== Statistics ==
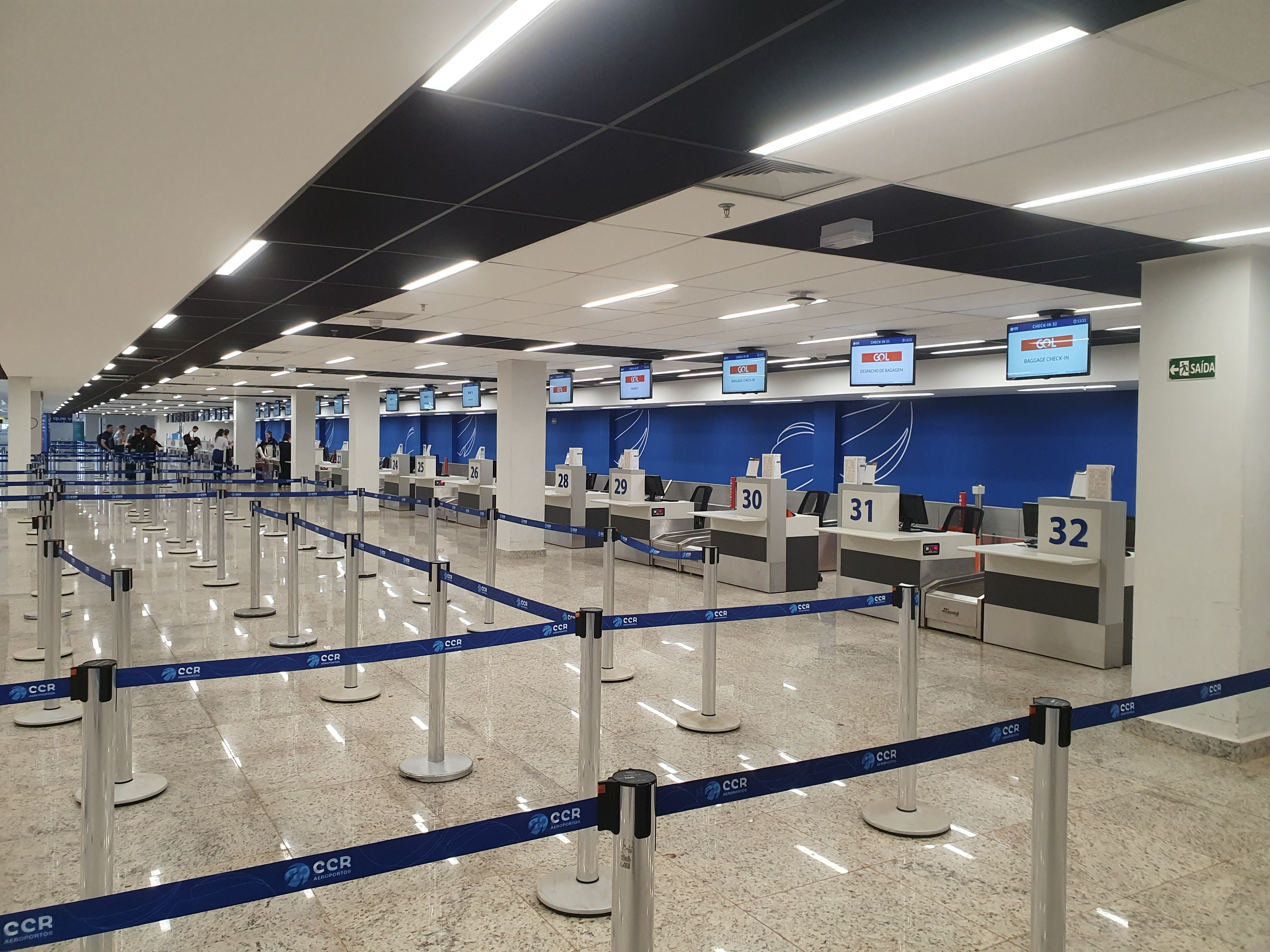
Check-in Hall

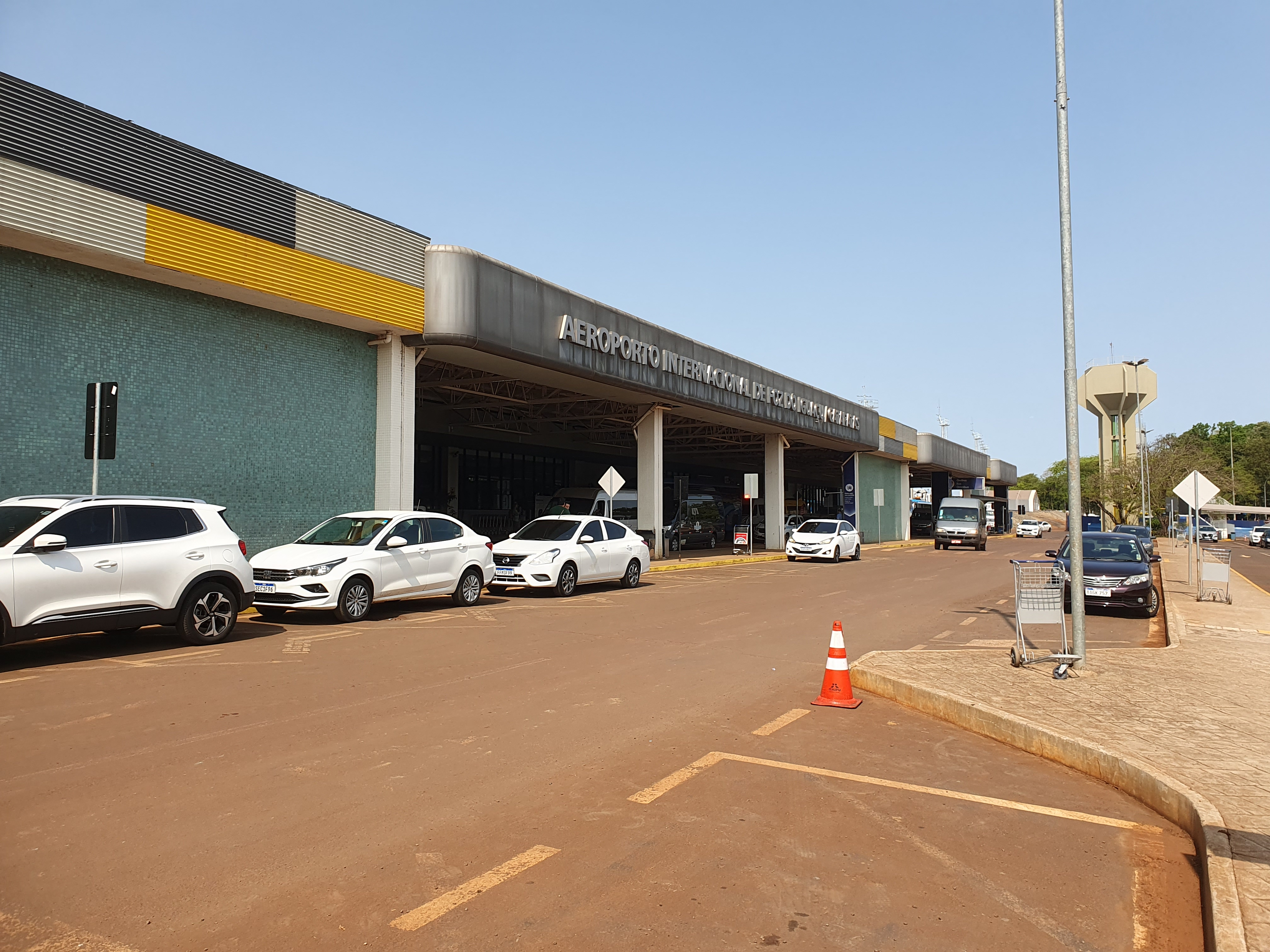
Terminal land side

Following are the number of passenger, aircraft and cargo movements at the airport, according to Infraero (2007-2021) and Motiva (2022-2025) reports:

Year	Passenger	Aircraft	Cargo (t)
2025	2,274,784 ▲23%	19,335 ▲15%	
2024	1,850,980 ▼4%	16,850 ▲1%	
2023	1,919,109	16,622	
2022^{a}	1,185,316	11,897	
2021	951,540 ▲16%	10,319 ▲21%	366 ▲26%
2020	822,403 ▼64%	8,514 ▼60%	291 ▼61%
2019	2,314,532 ▼1%	21,117 ▼1%	747 ▼2%
2018	2,342,489 ▲8%	21,636 ▲3%	762 ▲51%
2017	2,177,298 ▲18%	20,929 ▲14%	504 ▼3%
2016	1,851,116 ▼10%	18,402 ▼8%	521 ▼10%
2015	2,056,050 ▲9%	20,065 ▲6%	577 ▲57%
2014	1,880,564 ▲12%	18,887 ▲2%	367 ▲13%
2013	1,677,460 ▼4%	18,524 ▼7%	324 ▼46%
2012	1,741,526 ▲3%	19,917 ▼2%	603 ▼31%
2011	1,691,392 ▲46%	20,365 ▲28%	879 ▲9%
2010	1,155,615 ▲43%	15,886 ▲33%	804 ▲10%
2009	807,540 ▲5%	11,918 ▲10%	733 ▲3%
2008	766,444 ▲6%	10,878 ▲4%	713 ▲10%
2007	721,385	10,410	649

Note:
^{a}: 2022 series provided by CCR is incomplete, lacking data for the months of January, February and part of March.

== Accidents and incidents ==
- 18 August 2000: a VASP Boeing 737-2A1 registration PP-SMG en route from Foz do Iguaçu to Curitiba was hijacked by five persons with the purpose of robbing R$5 million (approximately US$2.75 million at that time) that the aircraft was transporting. The pilot was forced to land at Porecatu where the hijackers fled with the money. No one was injured.

== Access ==
The airport is located 13 km (8 mi) from Foz do Iguaçu downtown. A regular bus service connects the airport to the city.

== See also ==
- List of airports in Brazil
