= Estanisláo Przewodowski =

Brazilian military officer and engineer

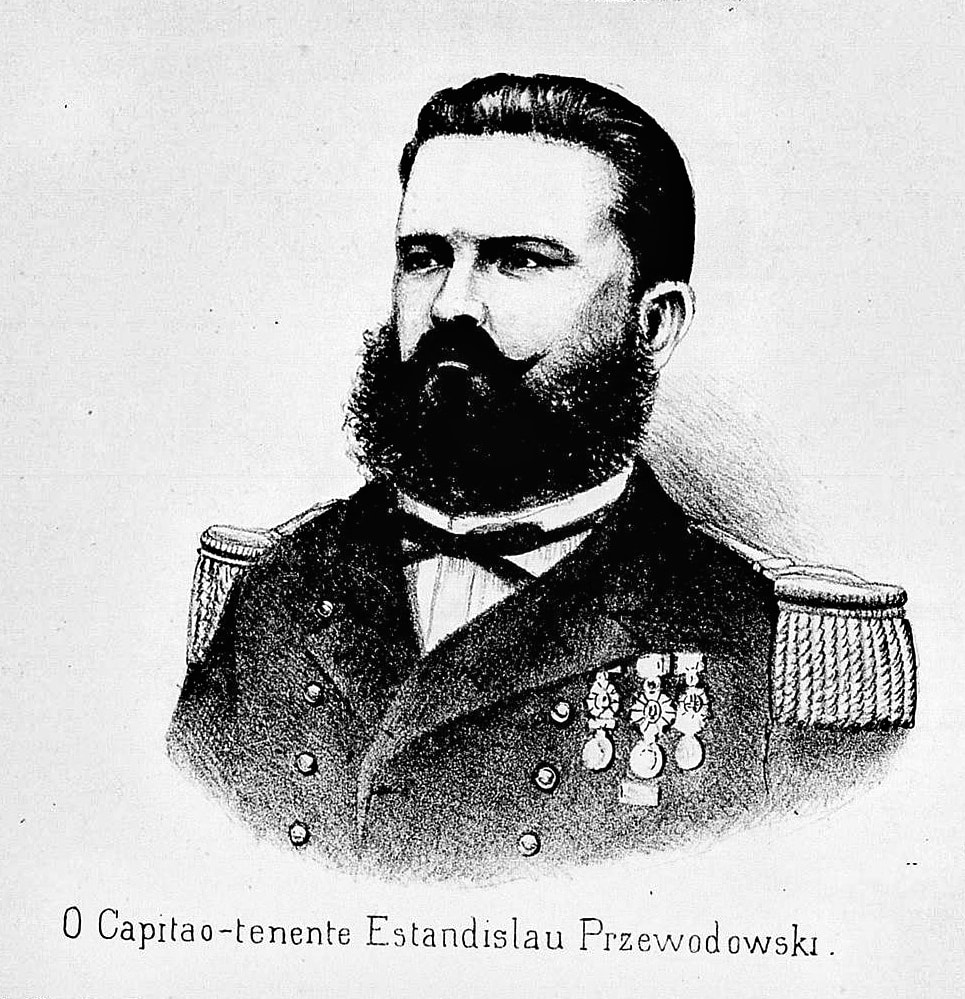
- Born: 22 October 1843; Salvador, Brazil
- Died: 25 August 1903 (aged 59) Salvador, Brazil
- Allegiance: Empire of Brazil
- Branch: Imperial Brazilian Navy
- Service years: 1858–1874
- Rank: Frigate captain
- Conflicts: Uruguayan War; Paraguayan War
- Spouse: Felicidade Perpétua Cardozo Pereira de Mello

Estanisláo Przewodowski (22 October 1843 – 25 August 1903), also known as Estanislau Prezewodowski, was a Brazilian military officer and engineer. A veteran of the Uruguayan and Paraguayan wars, in which he fought for the Imperial Brazilian Navy and received several commendations, later being made commander of the Upper Uruguay Flotilla, based in Itaqui. Occupying this post, he became known for having ordered the bombardment of the Argentine city of Alvear in 1874, causing a diplomatic crisis between the Brazil and Argentina in reaction to an aggression against a Brazilian doctor by Argentines. Despite being welcomed as a hero by the population of Rio Grande do Sul, he was dismissed from service for participating in the incident, being moved to the reserve with the rank of frigate captain.

In the reserve, he graduated in engineering, being appointed chief engineer for the demarcation and colonization missions of the Rio Pardo and Jequitinhonha valleys, in addition to being manager of the Bahia Navigation Company from 1894 to 1900. He was an effective partner and founder of the Geographical and Historical Institute of Bahia. He married Felicidade Perpétua Cardozo Pereira de Mello, niece of the Baron of São Marcos, in 1895.

== Biography ==
Estanisláo Przewodowski was born in Salvador on 22 October 1843, the son of engineer André Przewodowski, a Polish immigrant from the Russian Empire. Completing the humanities course, he joined the Navy, obtaining the title of aspirant on 23 February 1858, after which he made instructional trips to Europe and the United States. He was promoted to second lieutenant on 2 December 1862, first lieutenant on 20 July 1864 and captain lieutenant on 2 December 1869.

After participating in a mission in the Amazon to resolve a conflict with Peru, Przewodowski fought in the Uruguayan War, participating in the siege of Paysandú. Afterward, he fought in the Paraguayan War, in which he was an officer in the ship Beberibe and commandeder of the Greenhalgh, serving with the Marquis of Tamandaré and participating in the Battle of Riachuelo and in the passages of Cuevas and Mercedes. For his acts of bravery, he received the commendations of the Cruzeiro, the Order of Christ, the Rose, Aviz and medals for the oriental campaign.

After the end of the Paraguayan War, he was appointed commander of the Alto Uruguay Flotilla in Itaqui in 1872, and was eventually made lieutenant captain. In 1874, Pamphilo Manoel Freire de Carvalho, a doctor and lieutenant captain who came to help a Brazilian national in the neighboring Argentine city of Alvear, was attacked by two witchdoctors of Italian origin in front of the local police, who did not react. Przewodowski, in reaction, repeatedly called on Argentine authorities to hand over the attackers. As he did not get a reply, he ordered on 22 June that both flotilla monitors carry out hourly bombardments against the outskirts of the city, damaging some buildings, until, at the fourth shot, a commission from Alvear went to Przewodowski to negotiate a ceasefire, which was granted despite Alvear authorities no longer being able to hand over the attackers. The episode caused a diplomatic crisis between both countries, resulting in Przewodowski's dismissal despite his acquittal by the War Council.

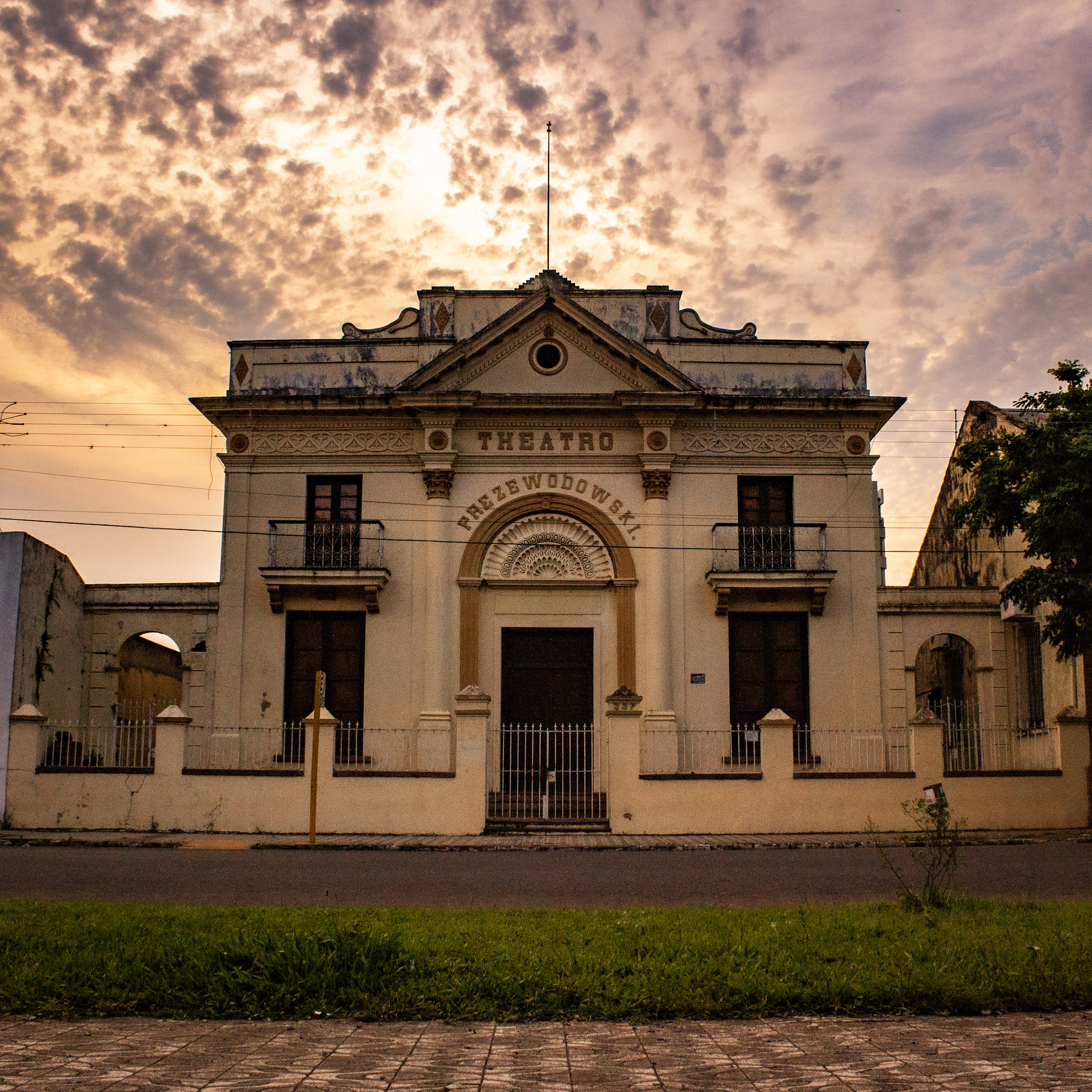
Przewodowski Theater

Przewodowski, however, was received as a hero by the population in Itaqui, who built a theater in his honor, the Theatro Prezewodowski. Construction began in 1883, when the foundation stone was laid by the eponymous Sociedade Anônima Estanislau Prezewodowski, making the theater one of the oldest in Latin America. The name reflects an alternate spelling of his name, "Estanislau Prezewodowski". The theater was put up for auction in 1942, but reopened in 1992. He himself, however, soon moved to Jaguarão, and was reformed as a frigate captain by the Imperial Navy.

Przewodowski completed an engineering course in 1876, and was successful as an engineer, being appointed chief engineer for the demarcation and colonization missions of the Rio Pardo and Jequitinhonha valleys. In 1889, he published A barra do Rio Grande do Sul, causes of obstruction and its removal (1889), co-written with Collatino Marques de Souza Filho. He was managing director of Companhia Norte Mineira, dedicated to colonization, agricultural industry and commerce in northern Minas Gerais, Espírito Santo and southern Bahia. It was incorporated by Banco Regional do Brasil in 1891. Przewodowski was also manager of the Bahia Navigation Company from 1894 to 1900, and a founding and effective partner of the Geographical and Historical Institute of Bahia in 1894.

On 12 June 1895, when he married Felicidade Perpétua Cardozo Pereira de Mello, niece of the Baron of São Marcos, the local population of Jaguarão held a soirée in which he was honored for "the noble and patriotic attitude he had taken in the Alvear Conflict". He had five children with his wife. He died in Salvador on 25 August 1903.
