= Alto Uruguay Flotilla =

- Flotilha Naval do Alto Uruguay
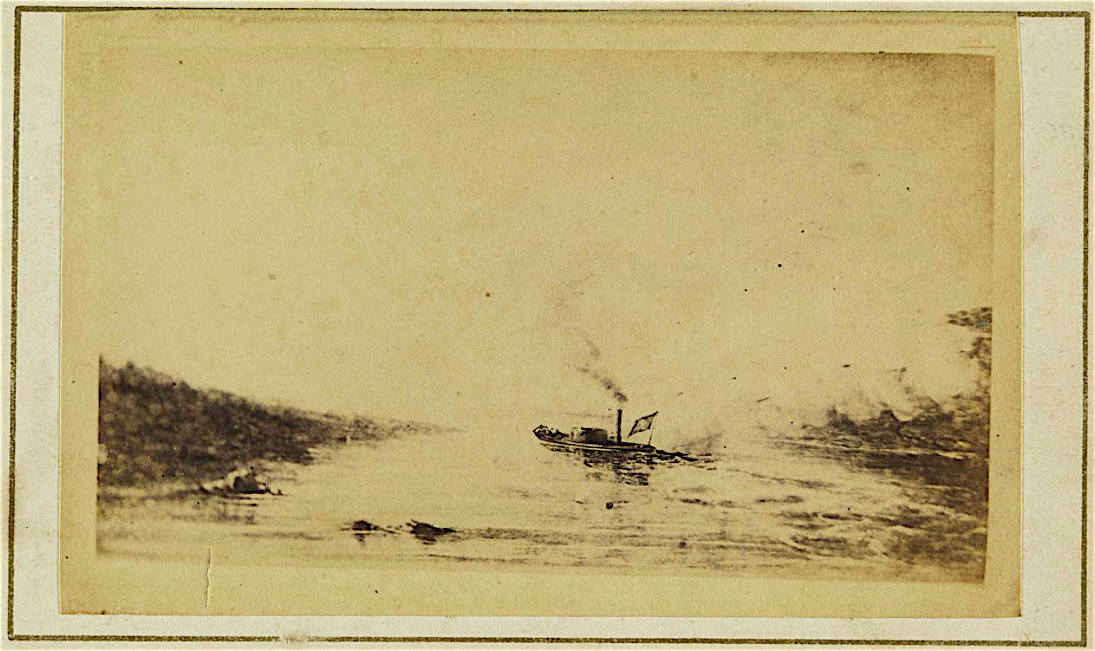
- A photo of Alagoas near Humaitá, River Paraguay, 1868. (National Library of Brazil.)
- Active: 1866 – 1906
- Country: Empire of Brazil; First Brazilian Republic
- Branch: Imperial Brazilian Navy; Early Republican Navy
- Type: Flotilla
- Garrison/HQ: Itaqui

Commanders
- Notable commanders: Estanisláo Przewodowski

The Naval Flotilla of Alto Uruguay was a flotilla based in Itaqui and operating in Brazil from 1866 to 1906.

In 1874, it became involved in the so-called Alvear Conflict, in which it fired on the neighboring Argentine city of Alvear.

== Origins ==
The flotilla was established in 1866 by the Brazilian Empire in Itaqui during the Paraguayan War, in order to prevent Paraguayan invasions of Rio Grande do Sul. It included the Pará-class monitors Alagoas and Rio Grande, as well as some smaller wooden ships. The command of the flotilla was briefly abolished in 1871, being combined with that of the Rio Grande do Sul Flotilla. In 1872, however, Estanisláo Przewodowski, a native of Bahia and of Polish origin, was appointed commander of the flotilla.

In 1874, Pamphilo Manoel Freire de Carvalho, a medical lieutenant-captain who had come to the aid of a wounded Brazilian in the nearby Argentine town of Itaqui de Alvear, was assaulted by two healers of Italian origin in front of the local police, who did not react. Przewodowski, in reaction, repeatedly asked the Argentine authorities to hand over the aggressors. Seeing no reaction, he ordered on June 22 that both flotilla monitors execute hourly bombardments against the city's outposts, until, at the fourth firing, a committee of Alvear residents went to Itaqui to negotiate a ceasefire, which Przewodowski granted.

The flotilla was terminated in 1906.

== Ships ==
From 1866 to 1879, the Flotilha Naval do Alto Uruguay was composed of:

Gunboats
Greenhalgh
Vidal de Negreiros
Tramandahy
Monitors
Alagoas
Rio Grande

== See also ==
- Paraguayan War
- Montevideo Naval Division
