= Battle of Riachuelo =

1865 battle of the Paraguayan War

- Part of the Corrientes campaign
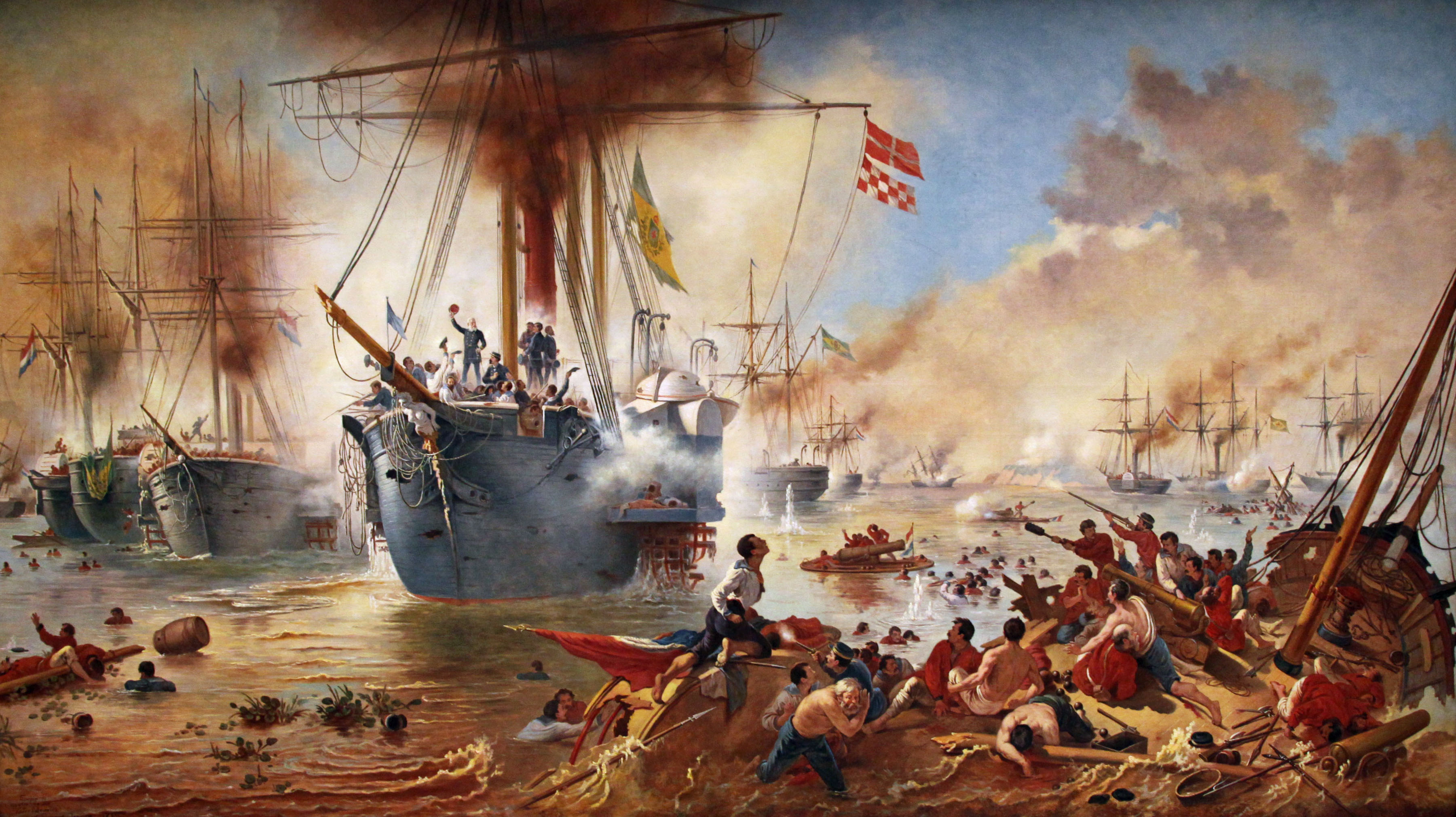
- The Battle of Riachuelo (copy by Oscar Pereira da Silva of original by Victor Meirelles)
Date	11 June 1865
Location	Riachuelo stream, Corrientes, Argentina 27°33′44″S 58°50′21″W
Result	Brazilian victory

Belligerents
Paraguay	Empire of Brazil

Commanders and leaders
Pedro I. Meza (WIA)	Francisco M. Barroso

Strength
Ships: 2 corvettes; 6 steamboats; 7 barges; Total guns: 44; Forces on land: 22 cannons; 2 congreve batteries	Ships: 1 frigate; 4 corvettes; 4 gunboats; Total guns: 58

Casualties and losses
750 casualties; 4 steamers sunk; 7 barges sunk	247: 104 killed 123 wounded 20 missing 1 corvette sunk

The Battle of Riachuelo (or Battle of the Riachuelo) was a large and decisive naval battle of the Paraguayan War between Paraguay and the Empire of Brazil. By late 1864, Paraguay had scored a series of victories in the war, but on 11 June 1865, its naval defeat by the Brazilians on the Paraná River began to turn the tide in favor of the allies.

== Plan ==
Paraguay's fleet was a fraction of the size of Brazil's, even before the battle, and arrived at the Fortress of Humaitá on the morning of June 9. The Paraguayan president Francisco Solano López prepared to attack the ships supporting allied land troops at Riachuelo. Nine ships and seven cannon-carrying barges, totaling 44 guns, as well as 22 guns and two Congreve rocket batteries from troops on the river bank attacked the Brazilian squadron, nine ships with a total of 58 guns.

The Paraguayans had planned a surprise attack before sunrise since they were fully aware that most Brazilian troops would sleep on land, leaving only a small garrison on board to guard the fleet.

The original plan had been for the Paraguayan steamers to approach the docked Brazilian vessels at night under cover of darkness, and board them outright. No other confrontation had been planned; the Paraguayan steamers were there only to provide cover from forces on shore.

== Battle ==
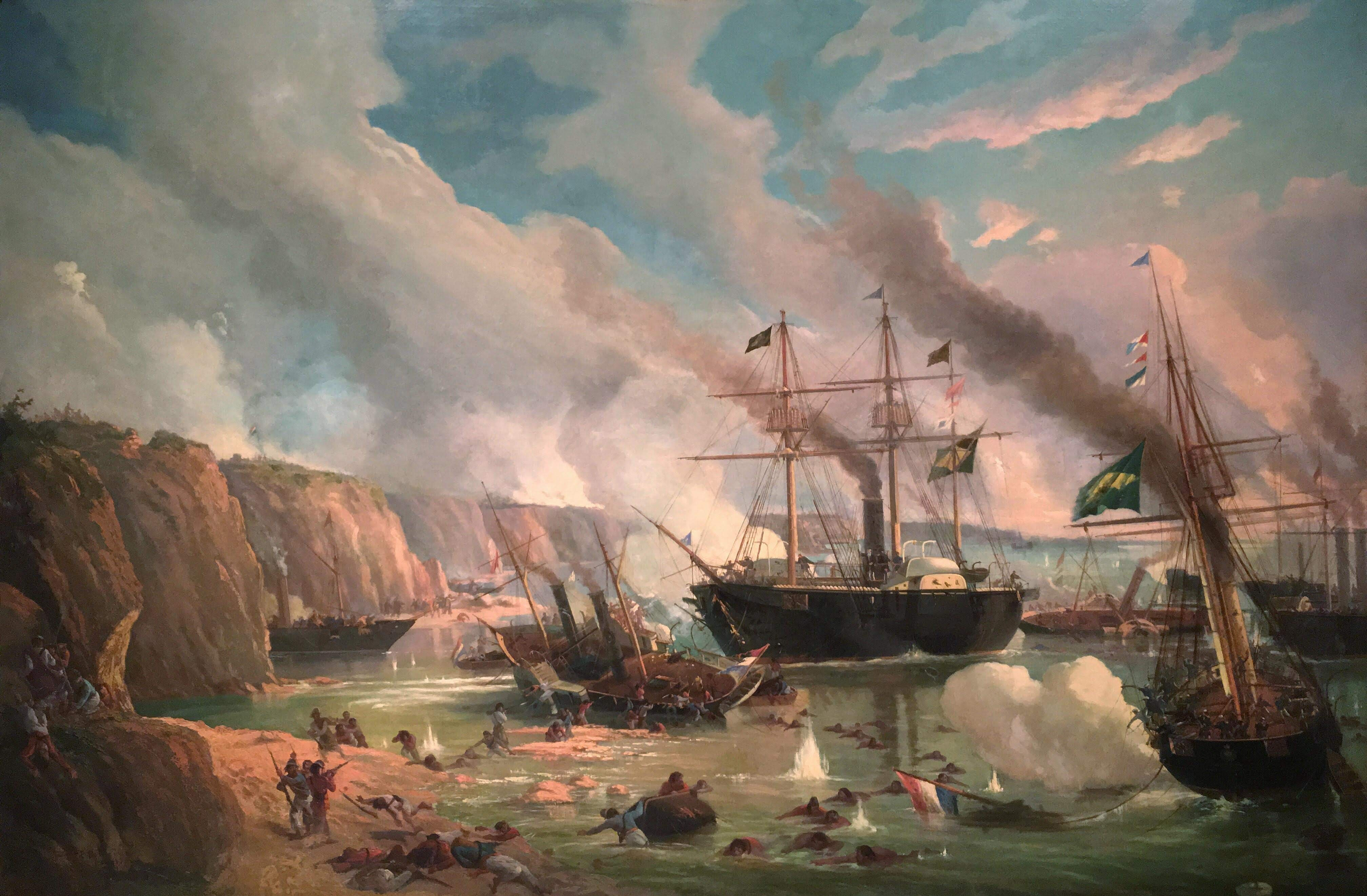
Brazilian steamers ramming Paraguayan ships.

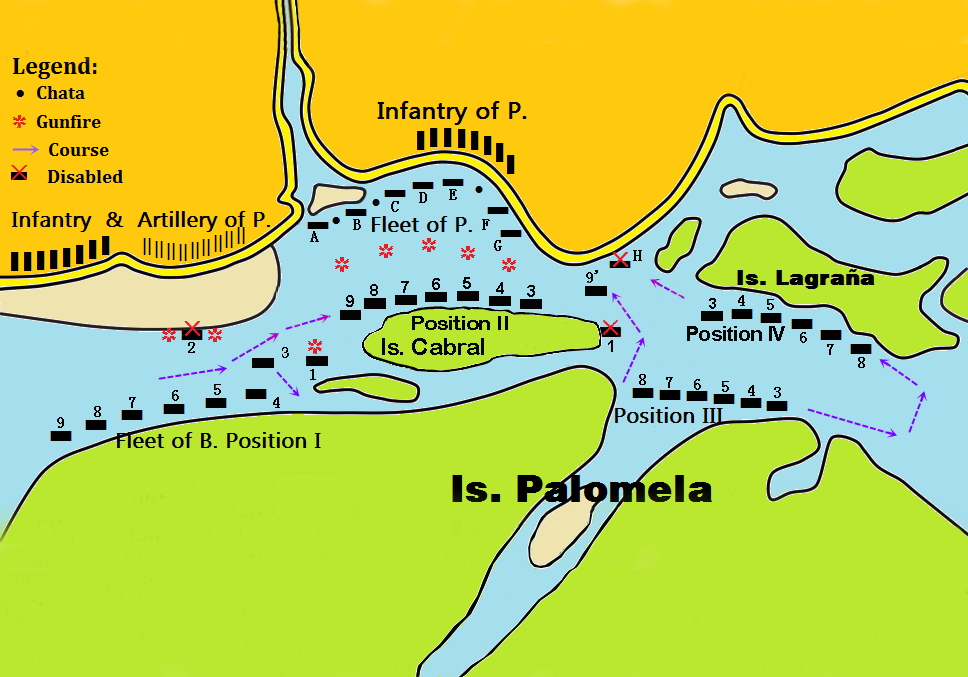
Battle of Riachuelo, stage 1. a) The Brazilian fleet goes downstream to meet the Paraguayan fleet. b) Amazonas goes out of the fleet for some reason and is followed by Jequitinhonha. Then, Amazonas returns to the fleet, and Jequitinhonha is heavily attacked by the infantry and the artillery on the cliff. c）The absence of Amazonas and Jequitinhonha makes Belmonte' become an easy target, heavily attacked, and drift downstream. d) The Brazilian fleet then turns around (keeping upstream in order to maintain the vessels' stability) while Panaiba comes to the aid of Jequitinhonha.

The Paraguayan fleet left the fortress of Humaitá on the night of 10 June 1865 and headed to the port of Corrientes. López had given specific orders to approach the docked Brazilian steamers stealthily before sunrise and board them, leaving the Brazilian ground forces bereft of their fleet at this early stage of the war.

López sent nine steamers, Tacuarí, Ygureí, Marqués de Olinda, Paraguarí, Salto Guairá, Rio Apa, Yporá, Pirabebé, and Yberá under the command of Captain Meza, who was aboard Tacuarí. However, some two leagues after leaving Humaitá, the fleet reached a point known as Nuatá-pytá, where the engine of Yberá broke down. After hours were lost in an attempt to repair it, it was decided to continue with the other eight steamers.

Although the fleet arrived at Corrientes after sunrise, there was a dense fog, and the plan was still viable since most, if not all, Brazilian forces were still on land. However Meza decided that instead of approaching and boarding the docked steamers in obedience to López's orders, the fleet was to continue down the river and fire at the camp and docked vessels as they passed by. The Paraguayans opened fire at 9:25 am.

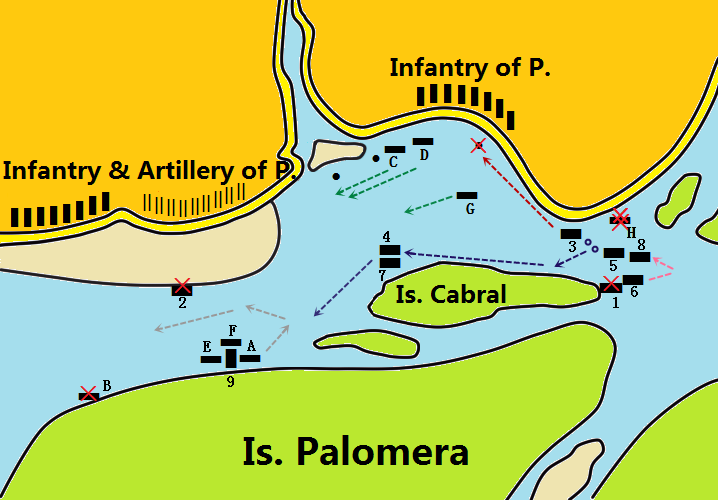
Battle of Riachuelo, Stage 2

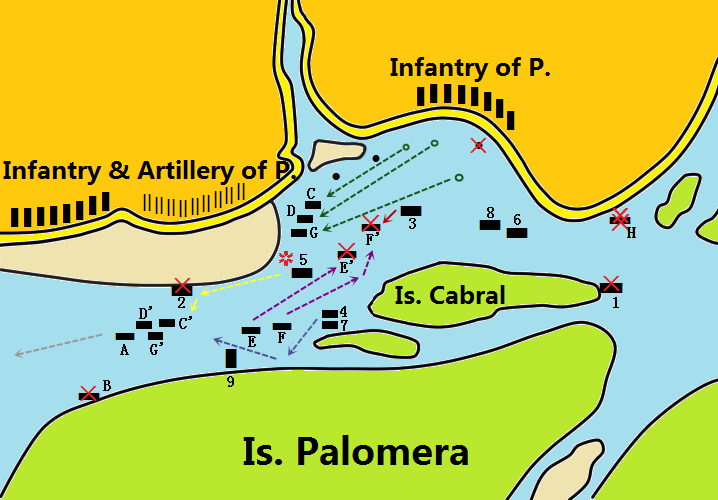
Battle of Riachuelo, Stage 3

The Paraguayans passed in a line parallel to the Brazilian fleet and continued downstream. Meza ordered the entire fleet to fire on the docked Brazilian steamers. The troops on land, realizing that their ships were under attack, hastily boarded them and began to return fire. One of the Paraguayan steamers was hit in the boiler, and one of the chatas (barges) was damaged. Once out of range, they turned upstream and anchored the barges, which formed a line in a very narrow part of the river, intending to trap the Brazilian fleet.

Admiral Barroso detected the Paraguayan tactic and turned downstream to go after the Paraguayans, but they started to fire from the shore into the lead ship, Belmonte. The second ship in the line, Jequitinhonha, mistakenly turned upstream and was followed by the whole fleet, leaving Belmonte alone to receive the full firepower of the Paraguayan fleet, which soon put it out of action. Jequitinhonha ran aground after and so became an easy prey for the Paraguayans.

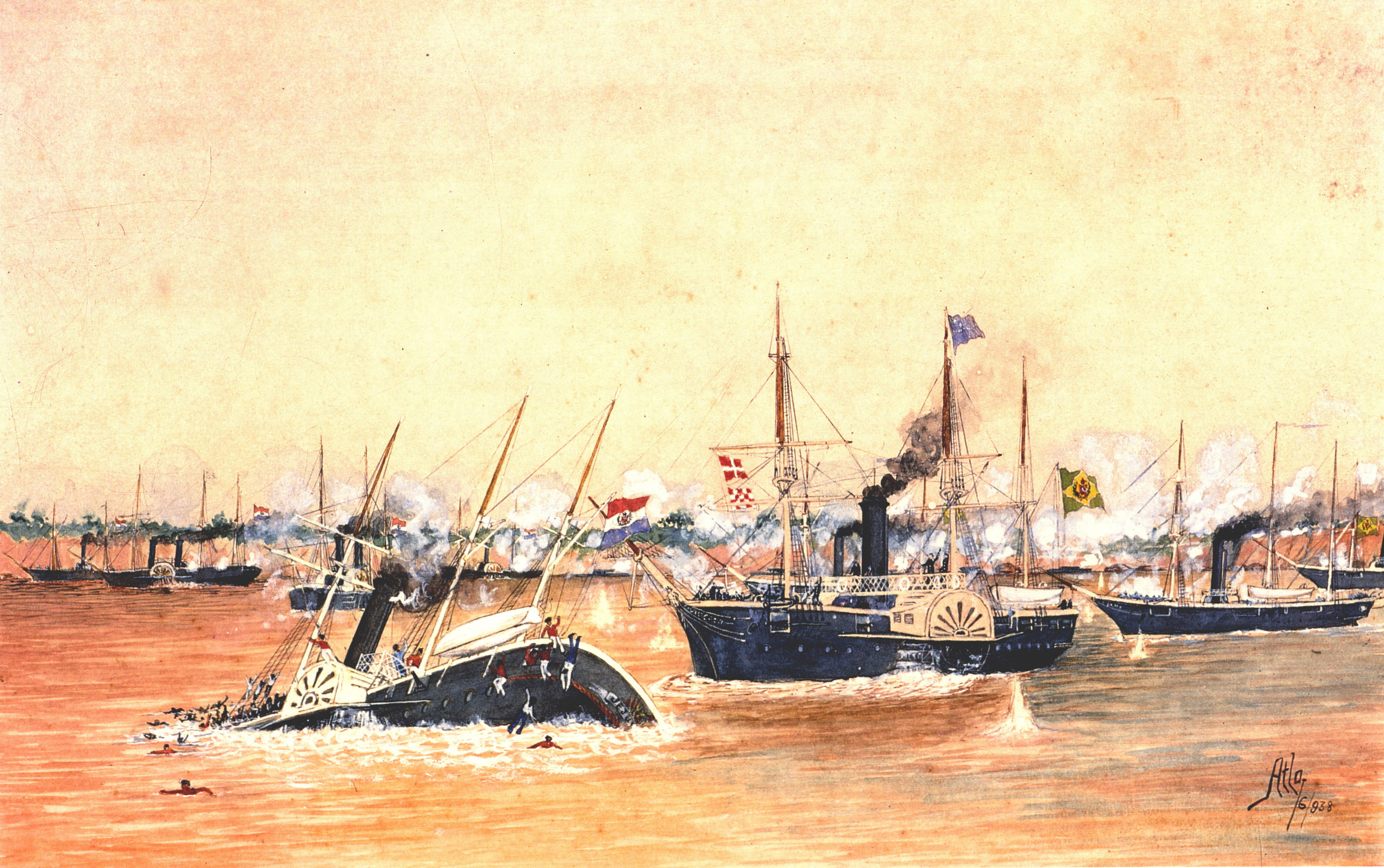
Battle of Riachuelo. The Brazilian frigate Amazonas rams and sinks the Paraguayan Jejuy.

Admiral Barroso, on board the steam frigate Amazonas, tried to avoid chaos and to reorganize the Brazilian fleet by leading the fleet downstream again to fight the Paraguayans to prevent their escape, rather than to save Amazonas. Barroso famously rallied his fleet signalling "Brazil expects that every man will do his duty", following the example of Horatio Nelson. Four steamers (Beberibe, Iguatemi, Mearim, and Araguari) followed Amazonas. Meza left his position and attacked the Brazilian line, which sent three ships after Araguari. Parnaíba remained near Jequitinhonha, and was also attacked by three ships that were trying to board it. The Brazilian line was effectively cut in two. In Parnaíba, a ferocious battle took place when Marquez de Olinda joined the attackers.

Barroso, now heading upstream, decided to turn the tide of the battle with a desperate measure. The first ship to face Amazonas was the Paraguarí which was rammed and put out of action. Then, he rammed Marquez de Olinda and Salto, and sank a "chata". Paraguari was already out of action and so the Paraguayans tried to disengage. Beberibe and Araguari pursued the Paraguayans and heavily damaged Tacuarí and Pirabebé, but nightfall prevented the sinking of those ships.

Jequitinhonha had to be set on fire by Paraguari and Marquez de Olinda. Ultimately the Paraguayans lost four steamers and all of their "chatas", but the Brazilians lost only the Jequitinhonha, coincidentally the ship responsible for the confusion.

== Aftermath ==
After the battle, the eight remaining Brazilian steamers sailed downriver. President López ordered Major José María Bruguez with his batteries to quickly move inland to the south to wait for and attack the Brazilian fleet as it passed. On August 12, Bruguez attacked the fleet from the high cliffs at Cuevas. All Brazilian ships were hit, and 21 men were killed.

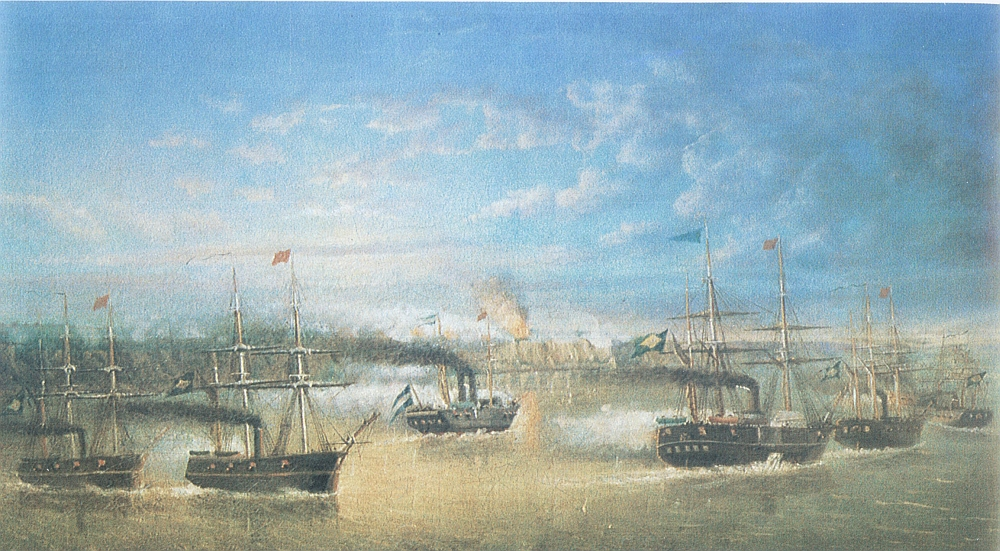
Battle of Cuevas

The Paraguarí, which had been rammed by the Amazonas, was set ablaze by the Brazilians. The ship had a metal hull; a few months later, López ordered the Yporá to retrieve the hull, tow it to the Jejui River and sink it there. Also, under orders from López, one month after the battle the Yporá returned to the scene and, again under the cover of night to conceal it from a Brazilian steamer nearby, boarded the remains of the Jequitinhonha and took one of its cannons.

Meza was wounded by a gunshot to the chest on June 11 during the battle, and died eight days later at the Humaitá hospital. López, upon learning of Meza's death, said, Si no hubiera muerto con una bala, debía morir con cuatro ("Had he not died from one gunshot, he would have to die from four"). He gave orders for no officers to attend Meza's funeral.

Manuel Trujillo, one of the Paraguayan soldiers who took part in the battle, recalled, "When we sailed downriver on full steam, passing all the Brazilian steamers on the morning of the eleventh, we were all shocked since we knew that all we had to do was approach the steamers and go 'all aboard!'" He also recalled that during the battle the land troops who had been taken on the steamers to board the Brazilian fleet shouted, "Let's approach the steamers! We came in order to board them and not to be killed on deck!"

Barroso had turned the tables by creatively ramming the enemy ships. The Brazilian Navy had won a decisive battle. General Wenceslao Robles had effectively been stopped in Santa Lucía River, and the threat to Argentina had been neutralized.

== Order of battle ==
=== Brazil ===
Unit	Type	Tonnage	Horsepower	Firepower	Notes
Amazonas	Frigate	1050	300	1 70 lb and 5 68 lb	Flagship – paddle steamer
Belmonte	Corvette	602	120	1 70 lb, 3 68 lb and 4 32 lb	
Jequitinhonha	Corvette	647	130	2 68 lb and 5 32 lb	
Beberibe	Corvette	637	130	1 68 lb and 6 32 lb	
Parnaíba	Corvette	602	120	1 70 Lb, 2 68 lb and 4 32 lb	
Ipiranga	Gunboat	325	70	7 30 lb	
Araguari	Gunboat	415	80	2 68 lb and 2 32 lb	
Iguatemi	Gunboat	406	80	3 68 lb and 2 32 lb	
Mearim	Gunboat	415	100	3 68 lb and 4 32 lb	

=== Paraguay ===
Unit	Type	Tonnage	Horsepower	Firepower	Notes
Tacuarí	Corvette	620	120	2 68 lb and 6 32 lb	
Ygureí	Steamboat	650	130	3 68 lb and 4 32 lb	
Marquez de Olinda	Steamboat	300	80	4 18 lb	Captured from Brazil earlier in the war
Salto Guairá	Steamboat	300	70	4 18 lb	
Paraguarí	Corvette	730	130	2 68 lb and 6 32 lb	
Yporá	Steamboat	300	80	4 guns	Gun rates unavailable. Scuttled in the River Yhaguy after the battle. Boiler, crankshaft and paddle wheel on display
Yberá	Steamboat	300		4 guns	
Pirabebé	Steamboat	150	60	1 18 lb	Scuttled in the River Yhaguy after the battle. Wreckage restored and today on public display
Rio Apa					
2 Chatas		40		1 80 lb gun each	Barges – Towed
5 Chatas		35		1 68 lb each	Barges – Towed
Shore troops				22 32 lb and two congreve batteries	Shore troops

== Gallery ==
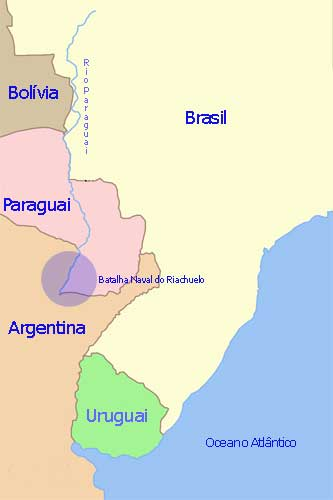
Place where the battle was fought.

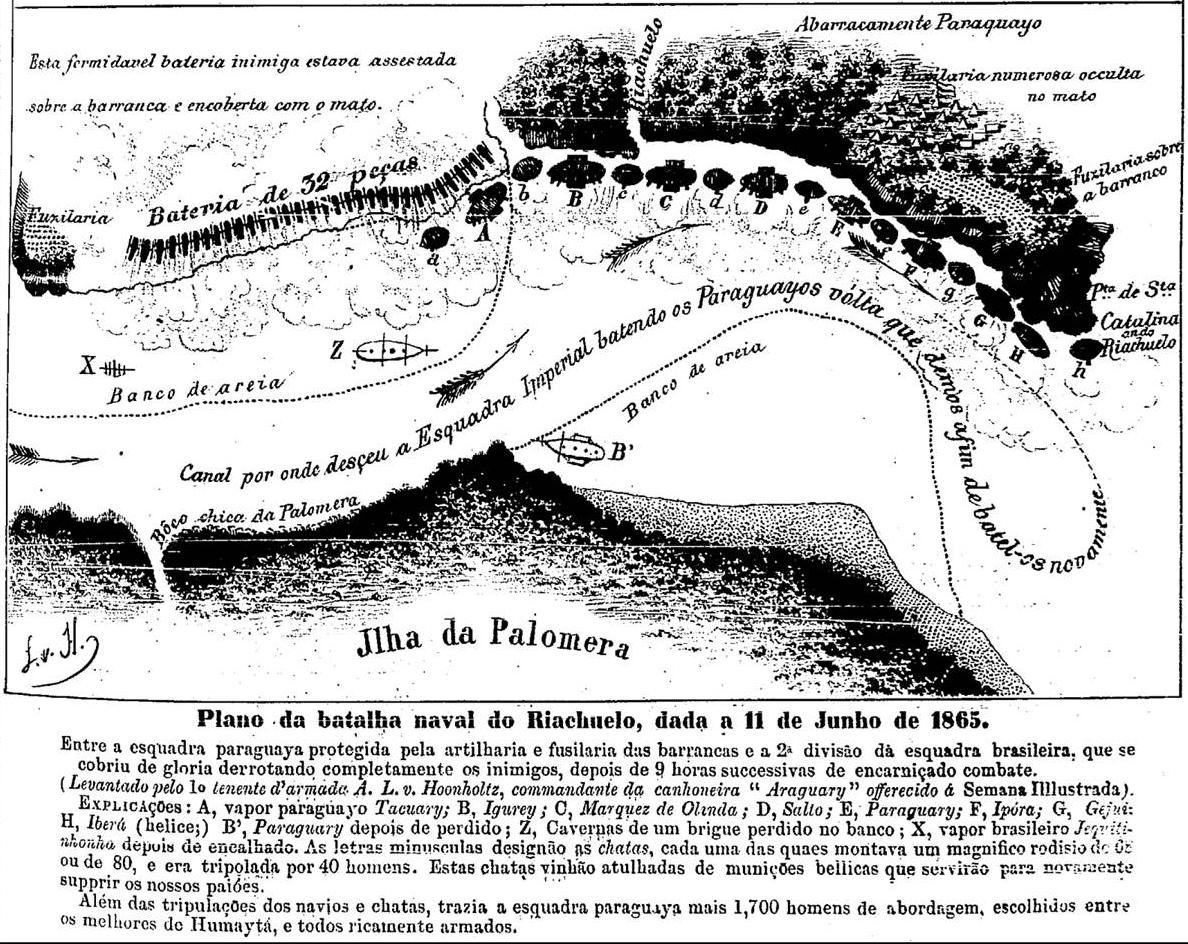
Plan of the battle in Portuguese.

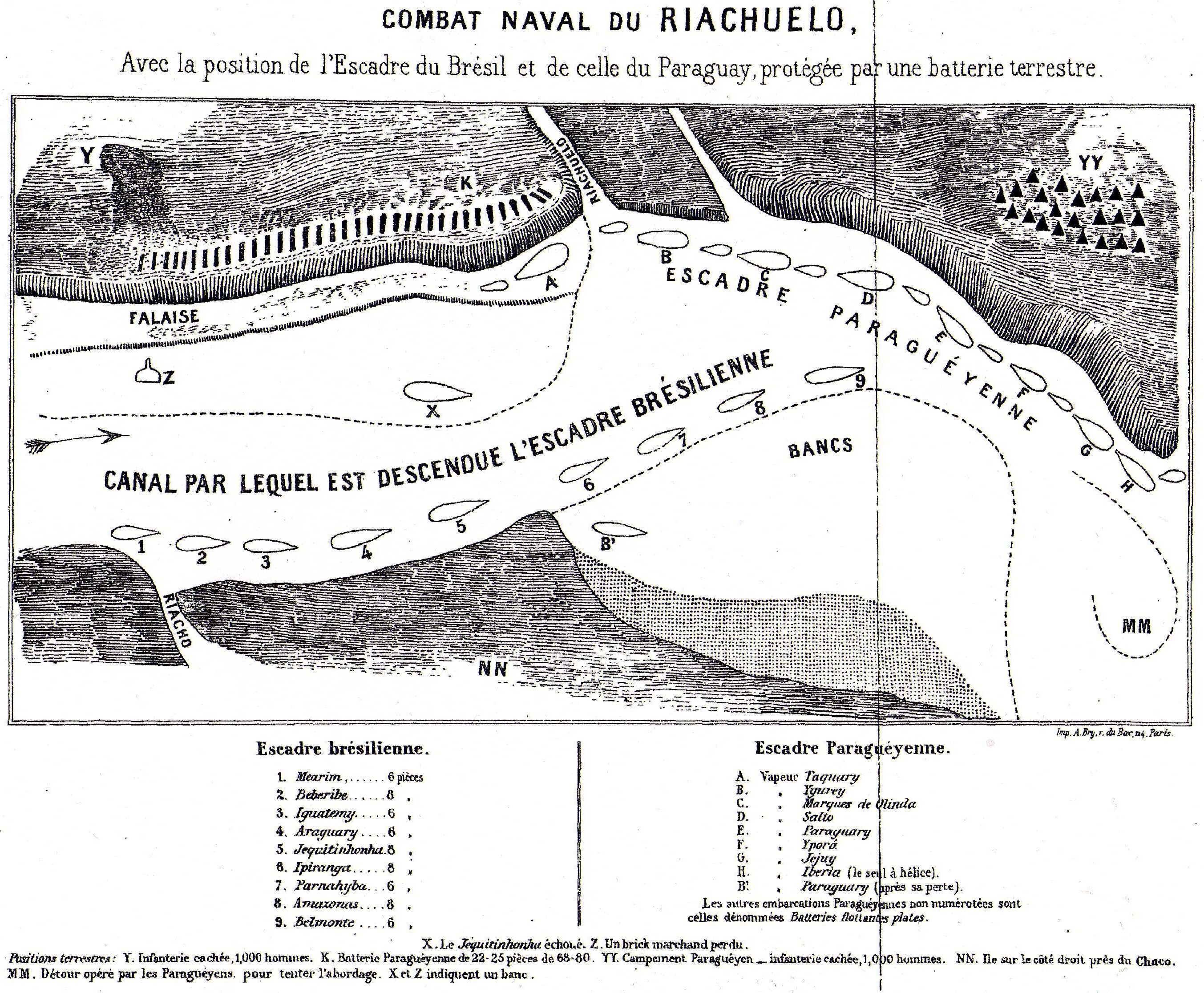
Plan of the battle in French.

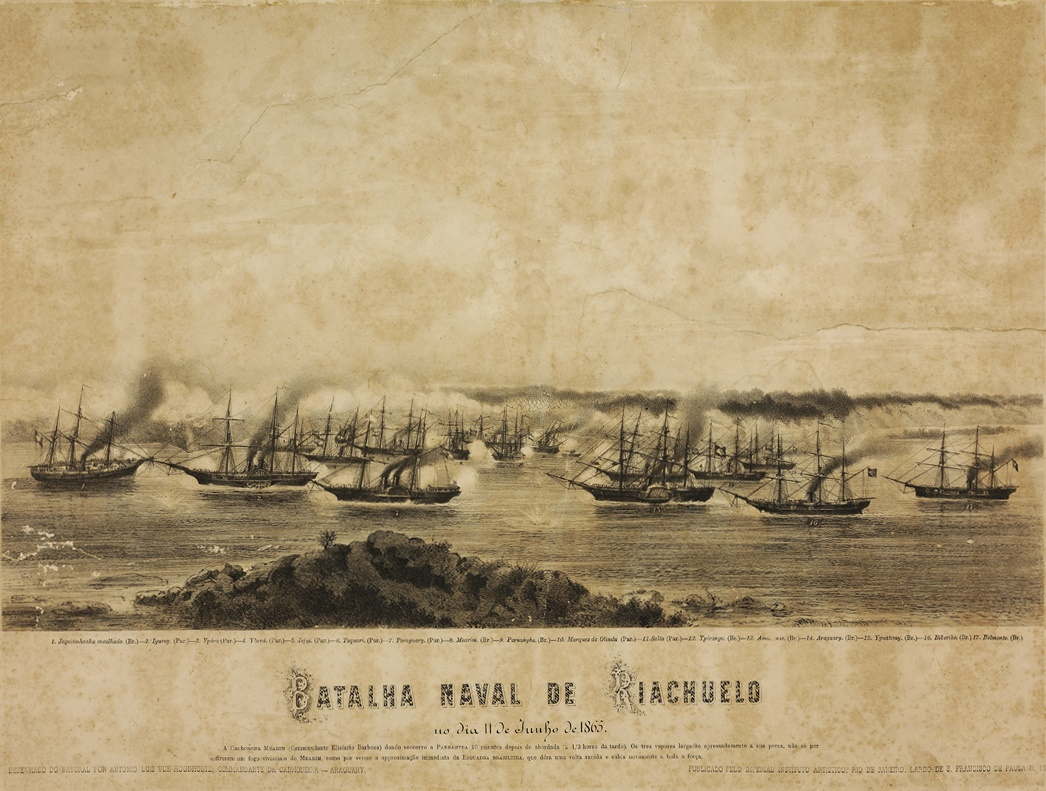
The Jequitinhonha (left) trapped on a sandbar during the Battle of Riachuelo.

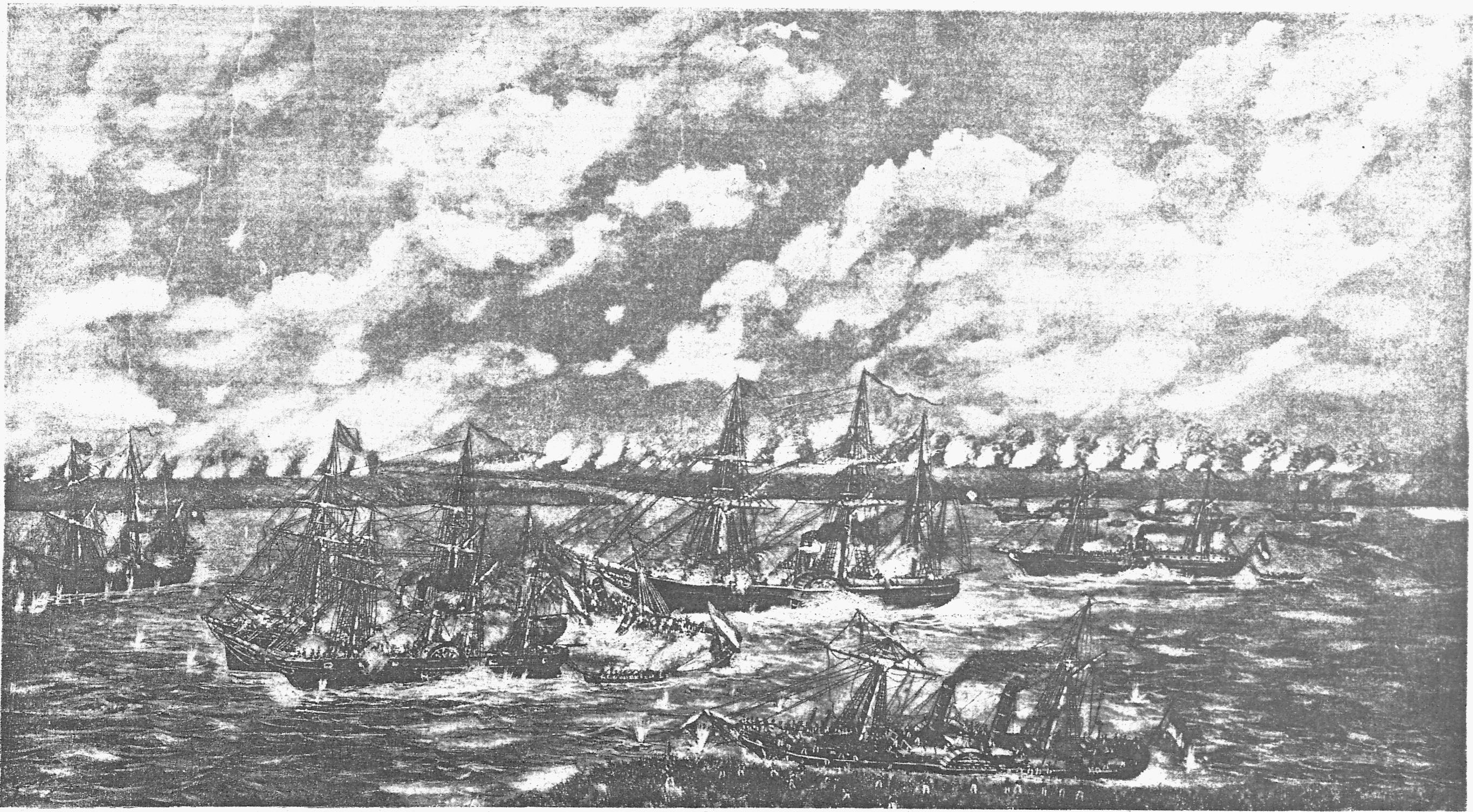

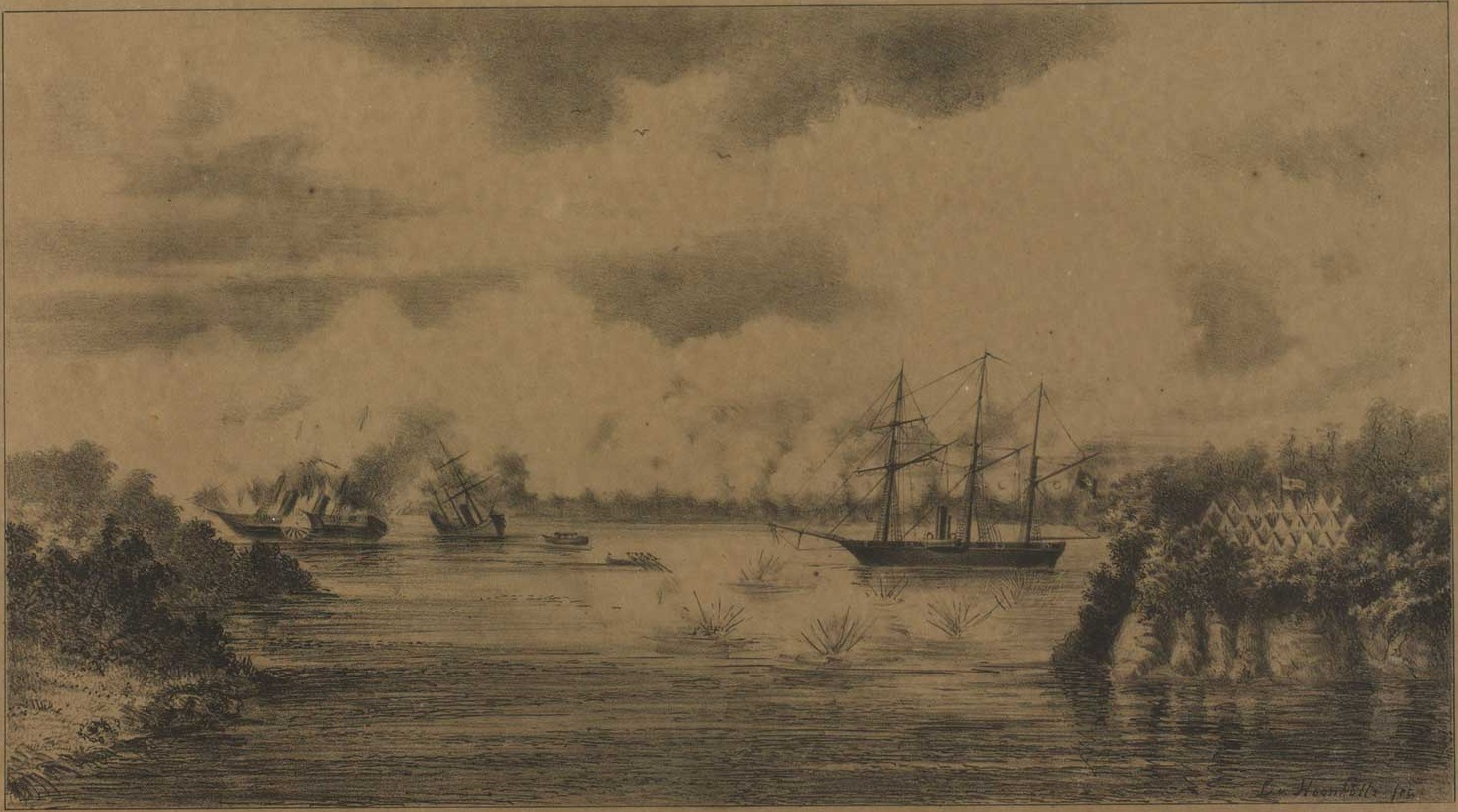

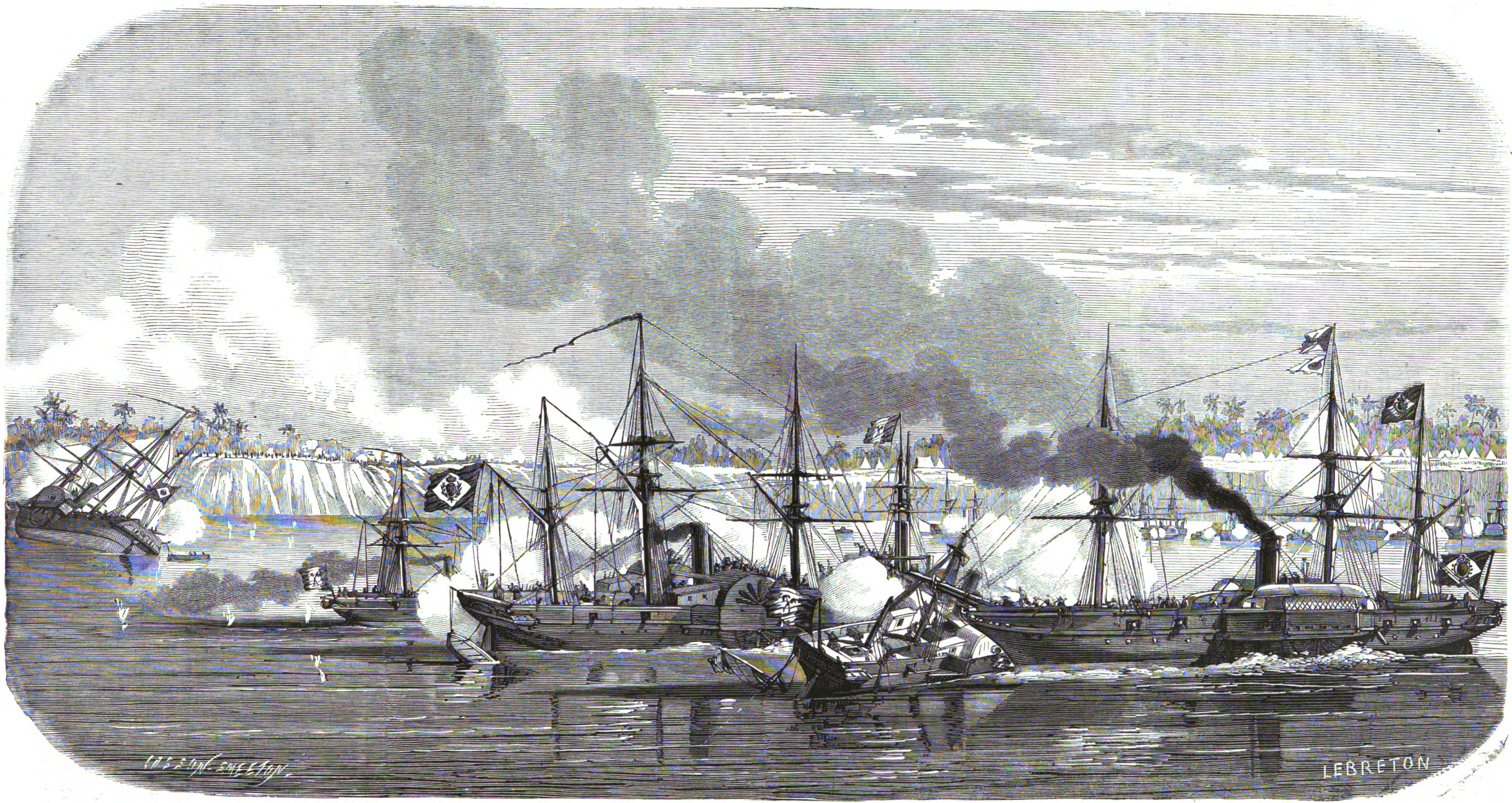

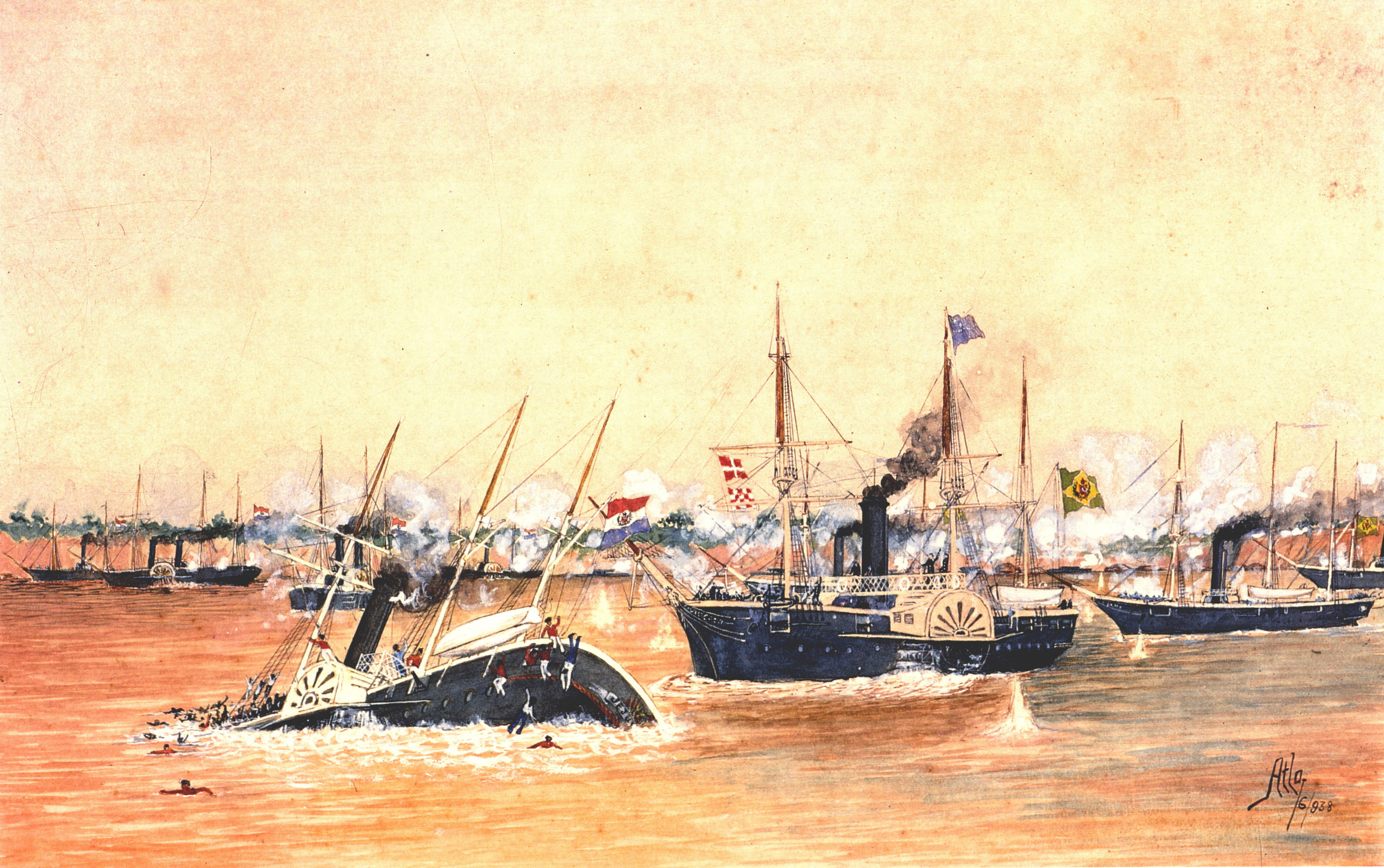
The Brazilian corvette Amazonas rams and sinks the Paraguayan Jejuy.

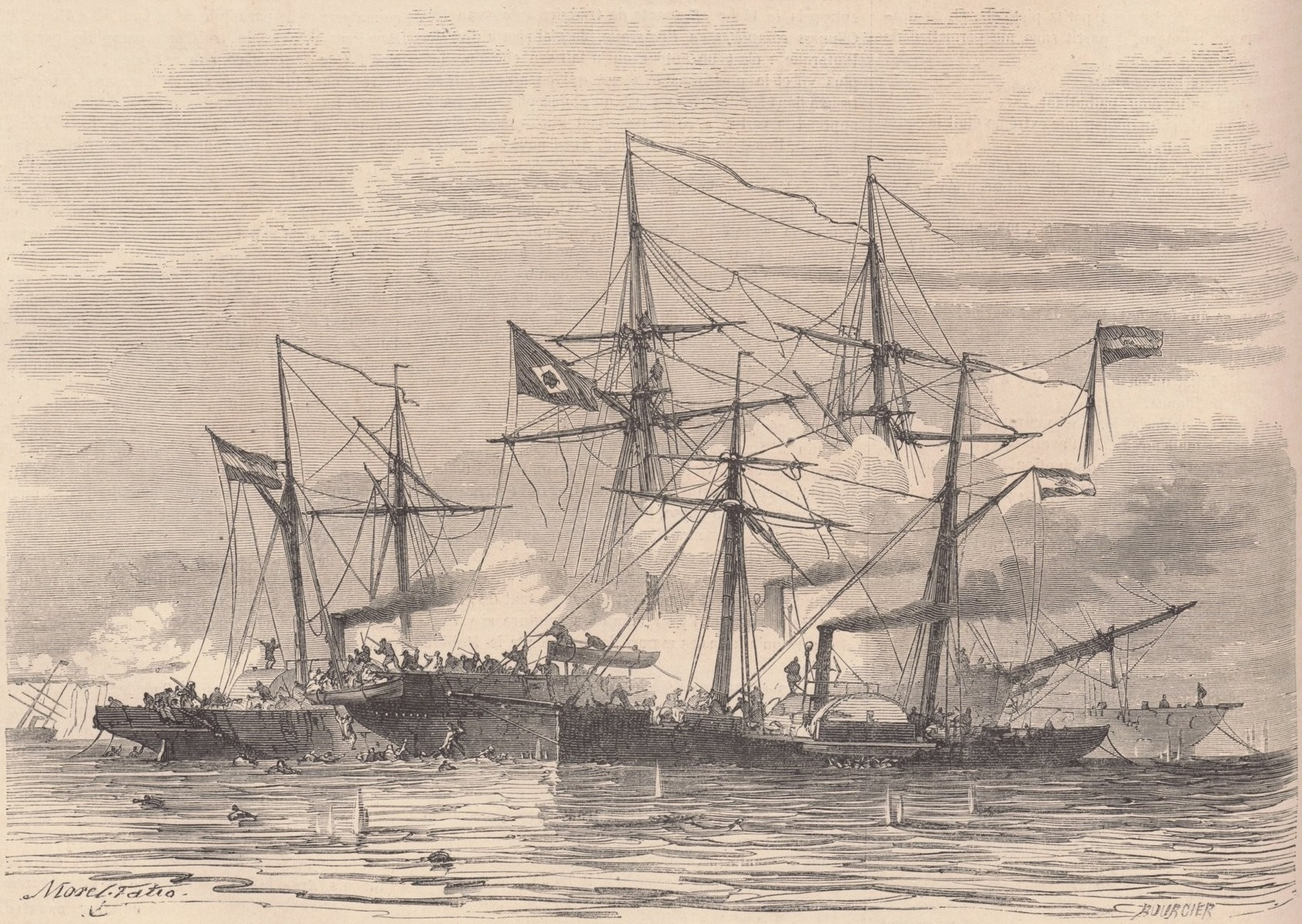

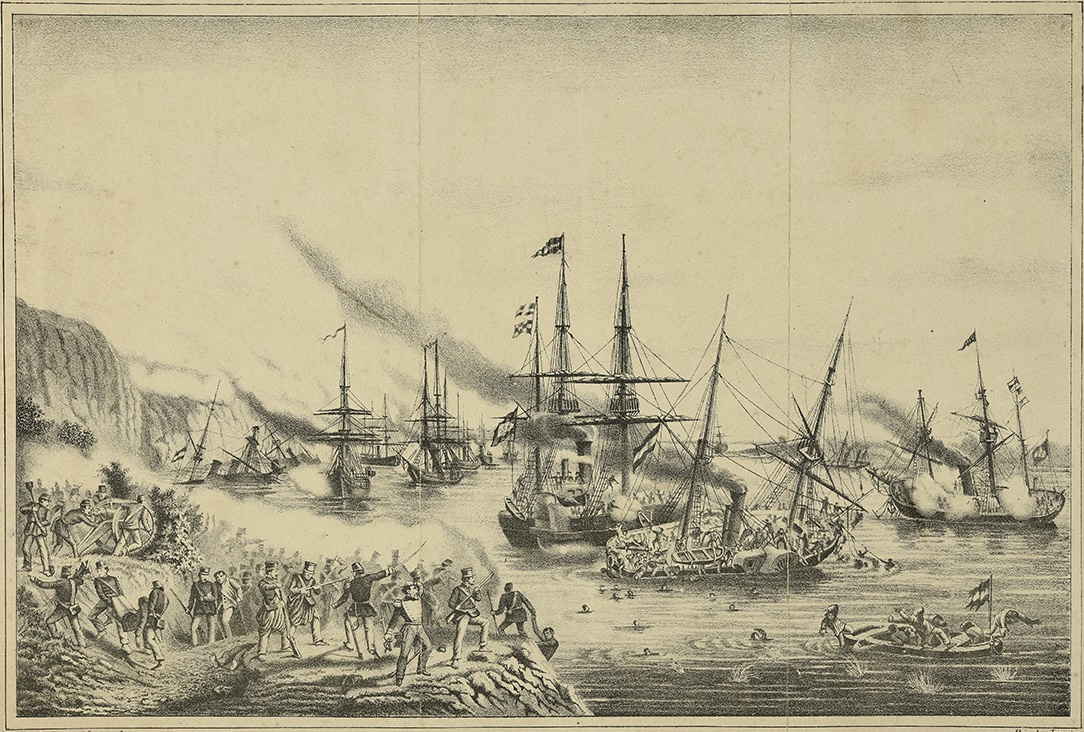

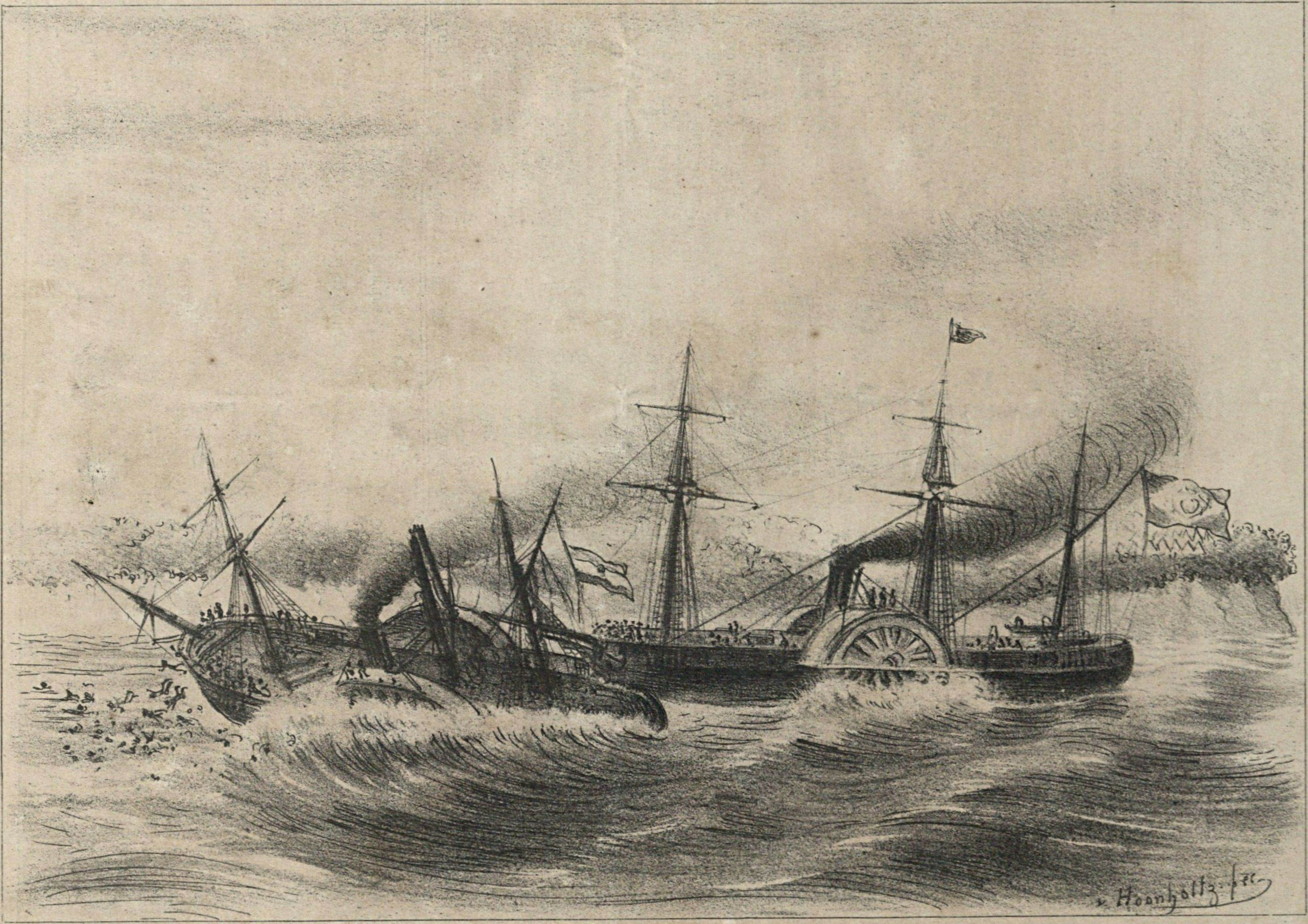

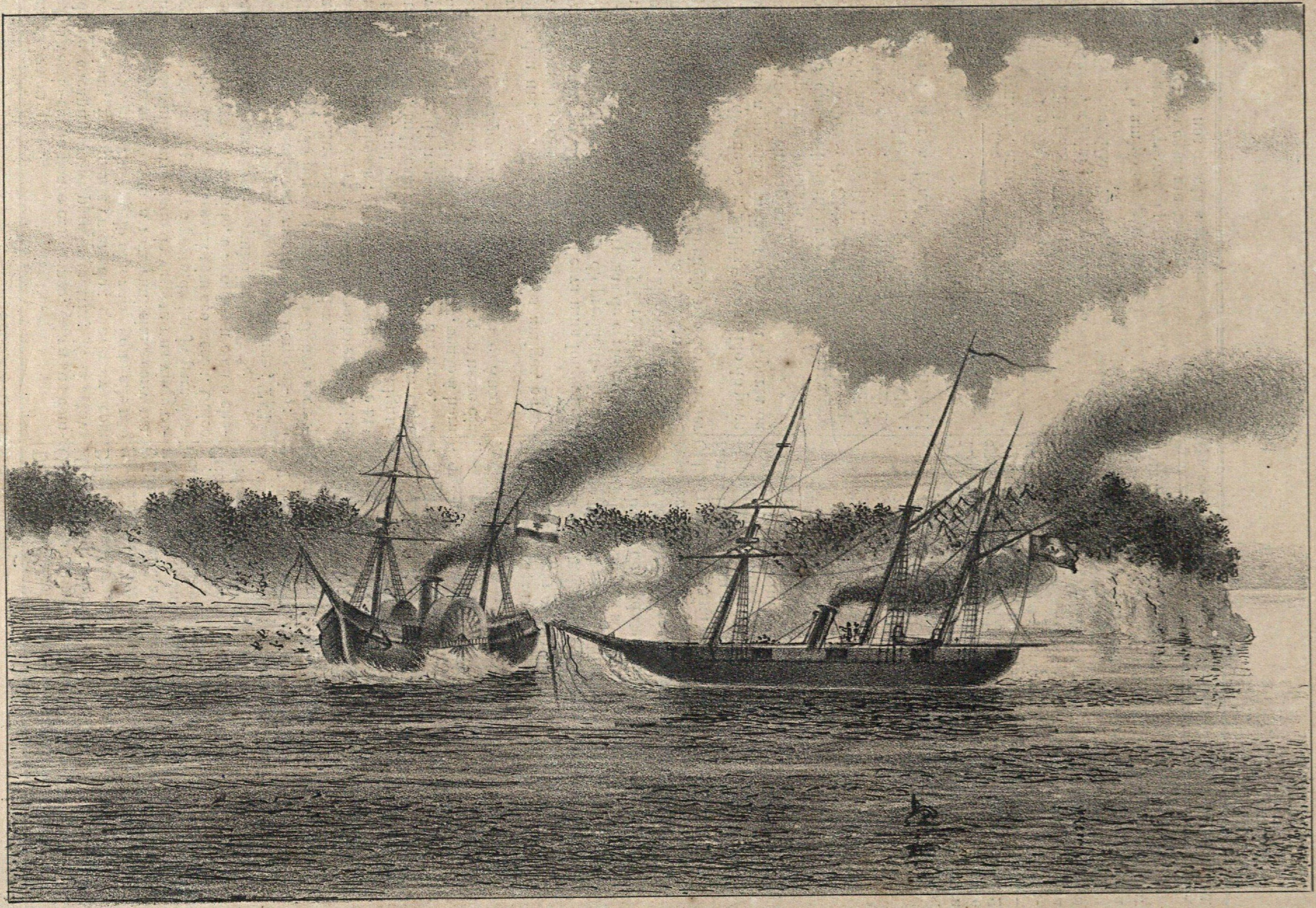

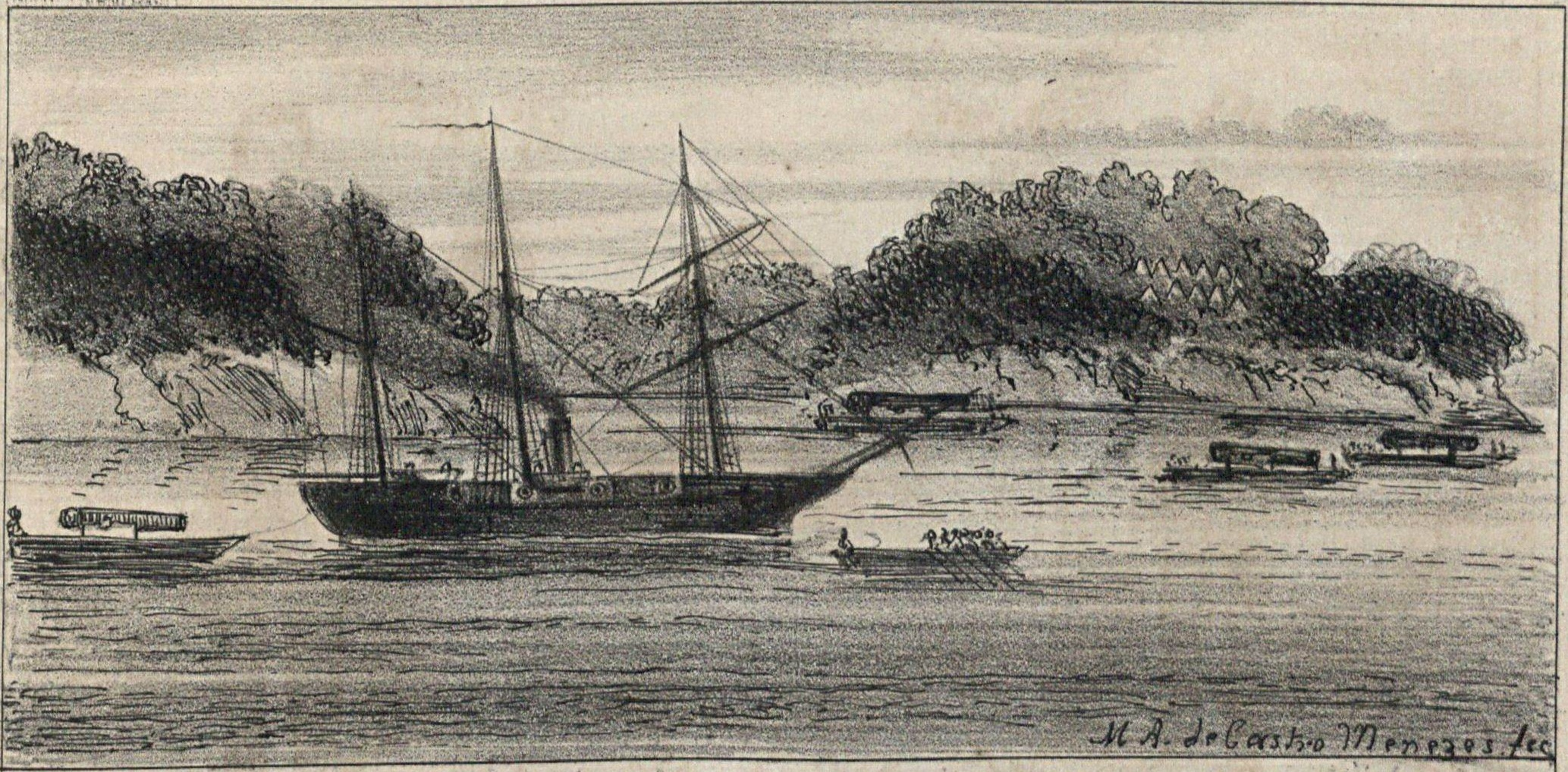

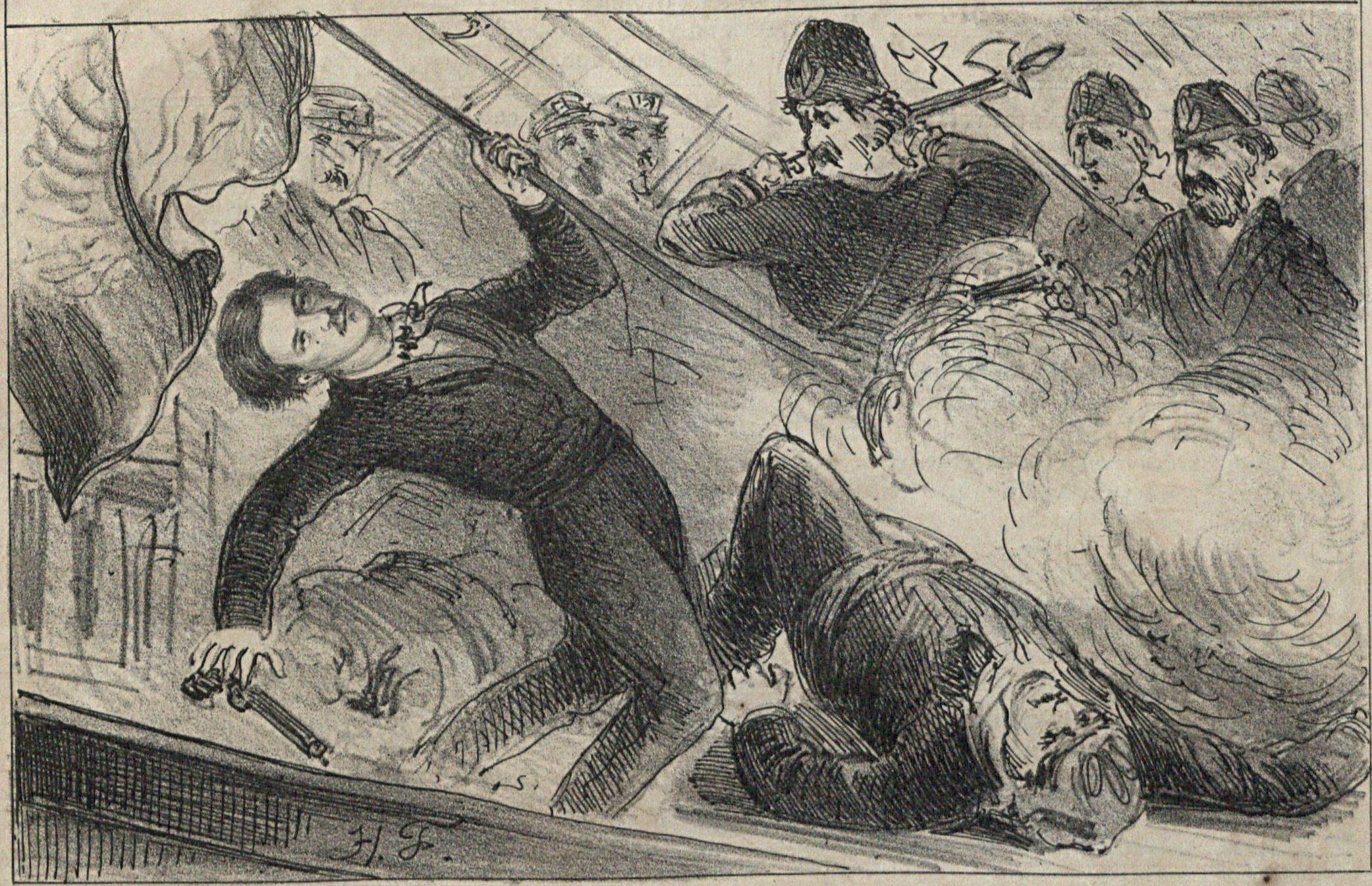

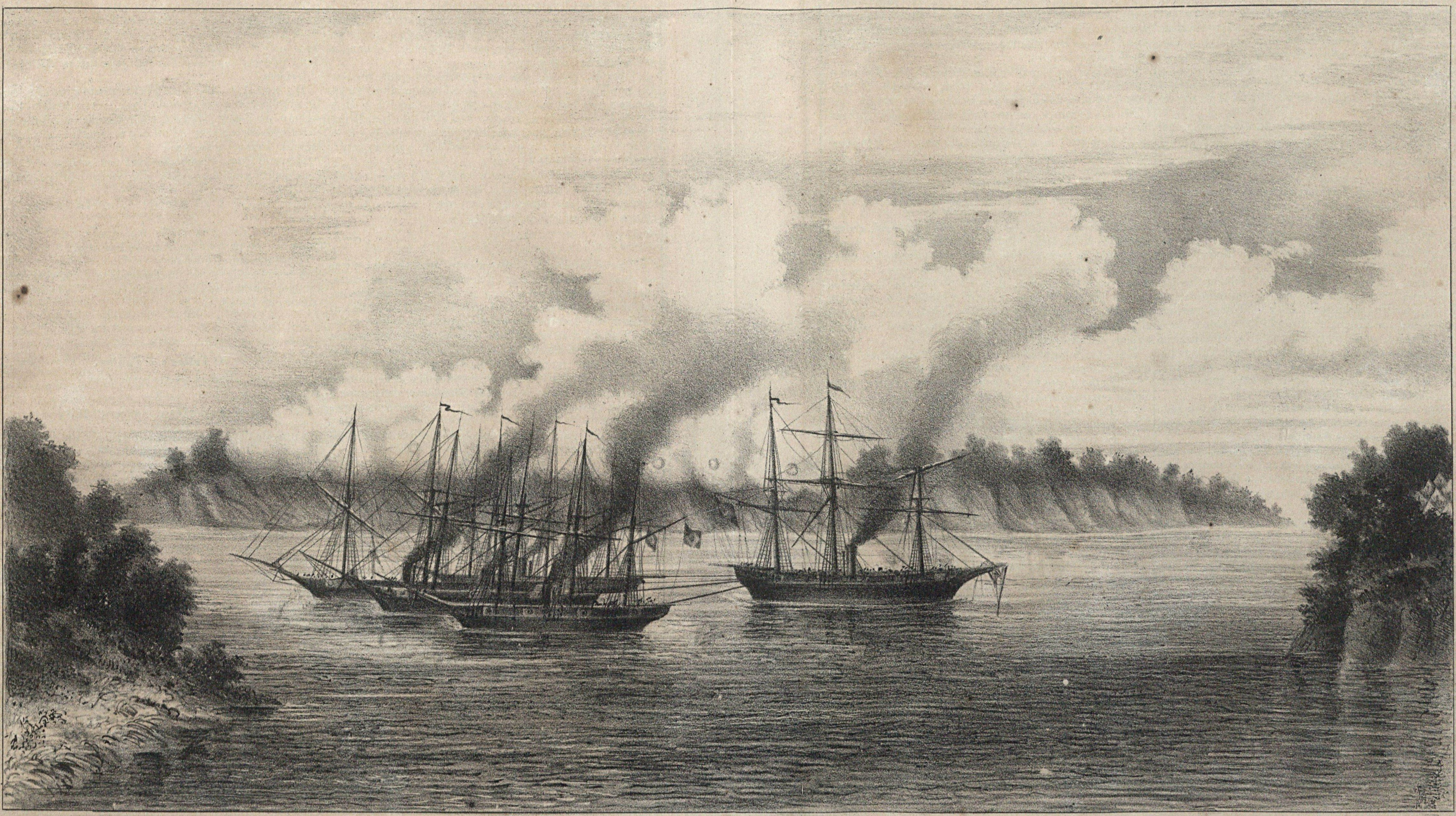
The Ypiranga, Mearim, Araguary and Iguatemy trying to refloat the Jequitinhonha.

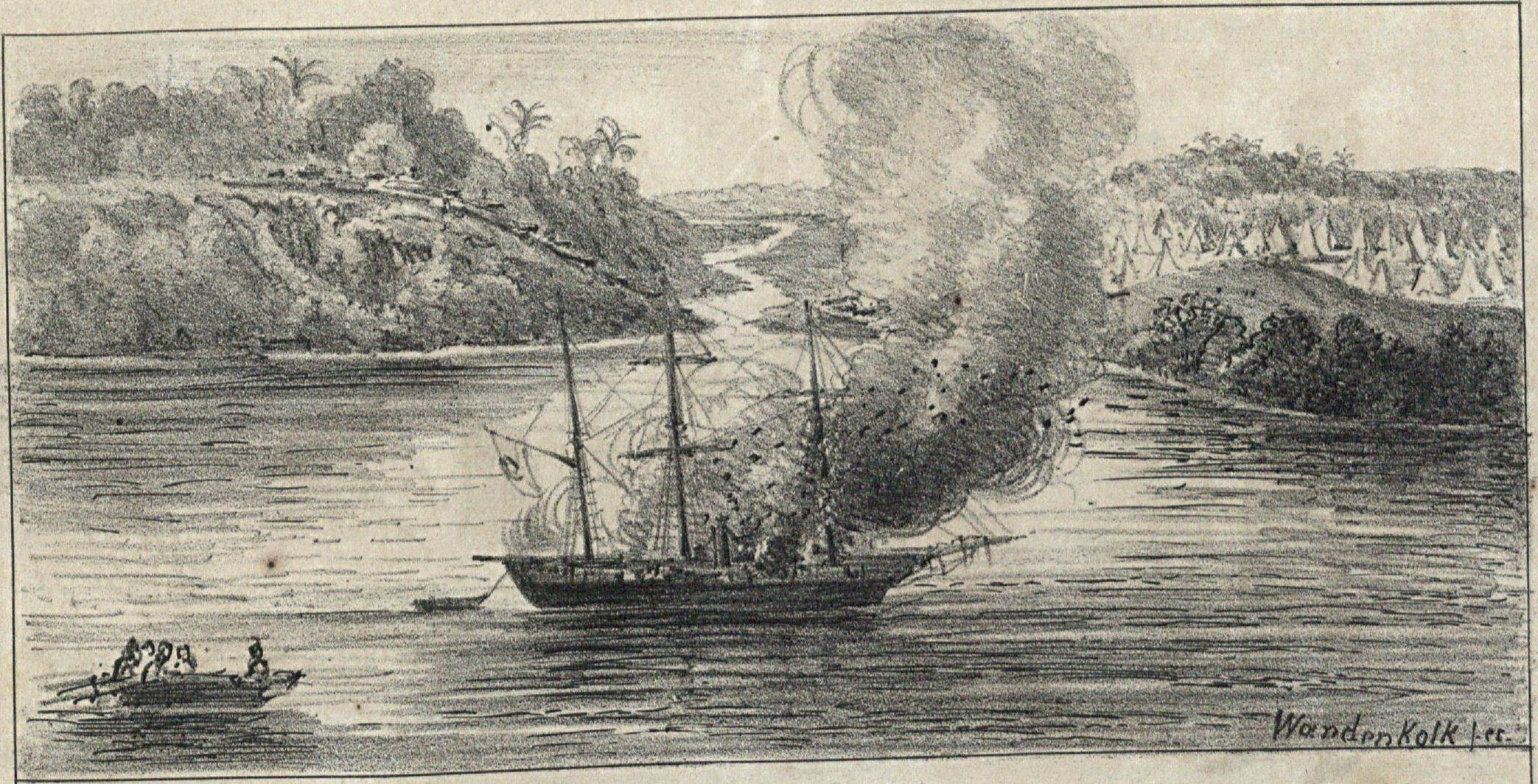
The Jequitinhonha ran under the batteries of the strong enemies, having to be left by the crew. Not being able to get away from the beach, it was burned by the crew.

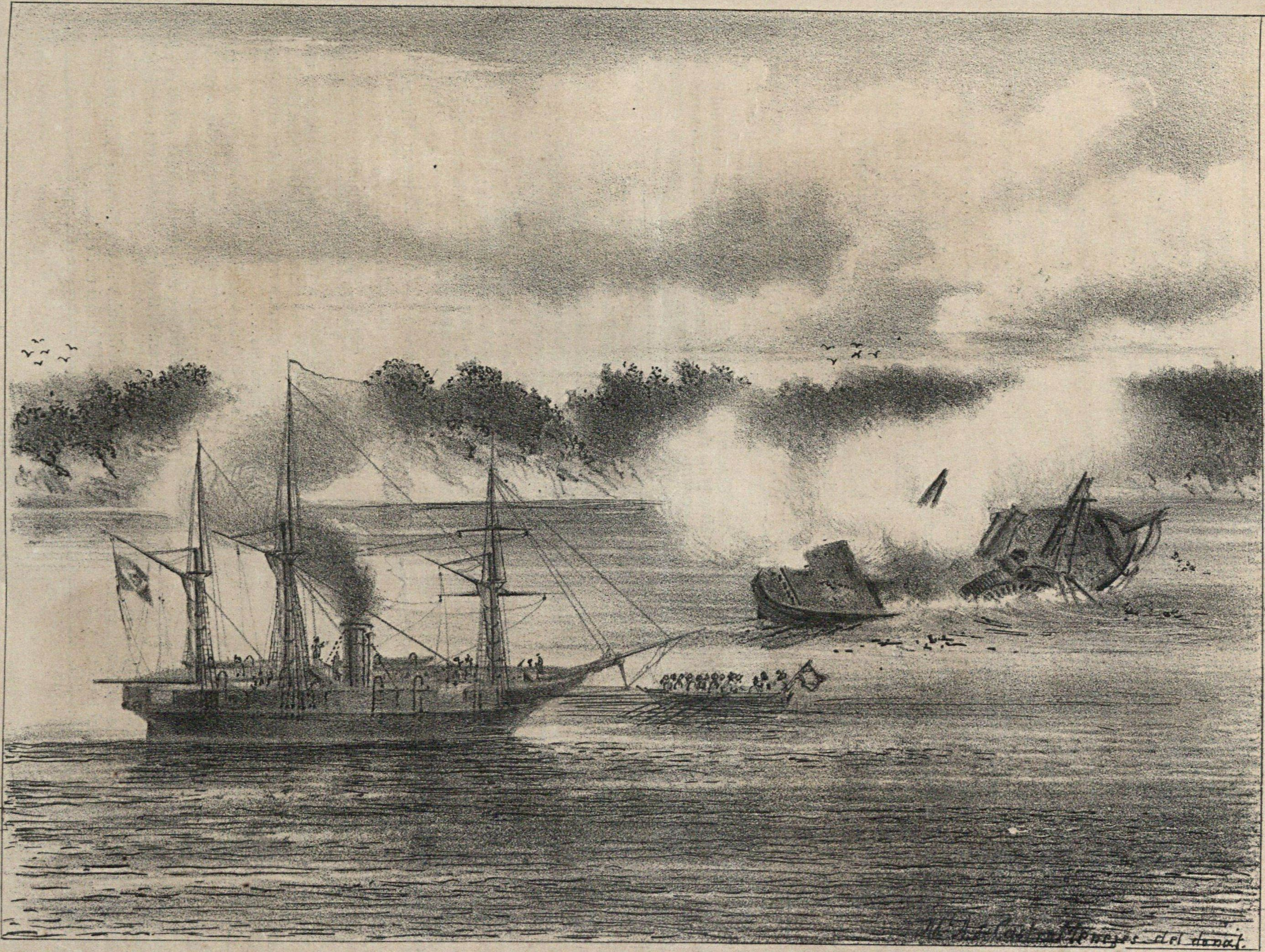

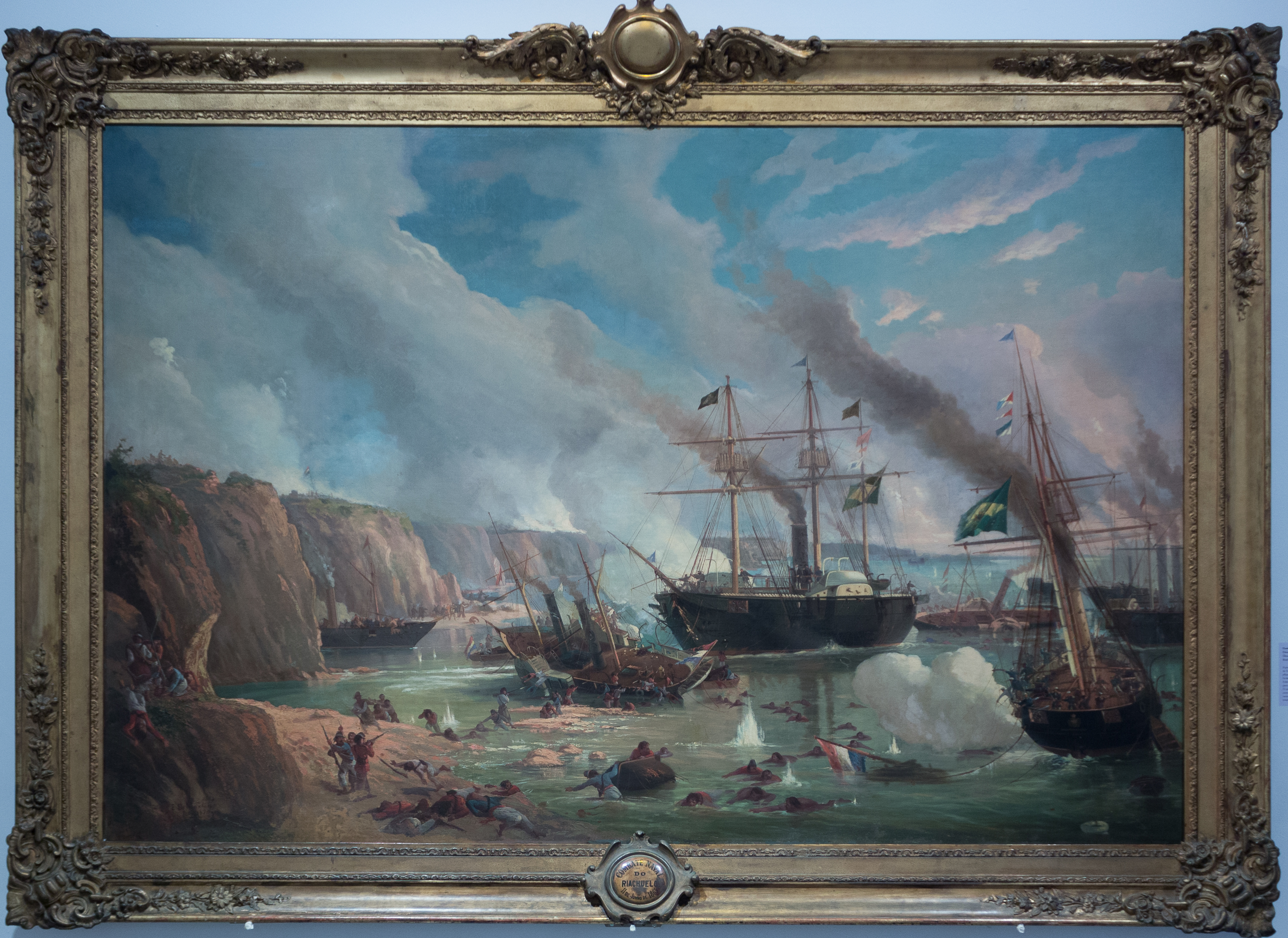
Combat of Riachuelo by Edoardo De Martino.

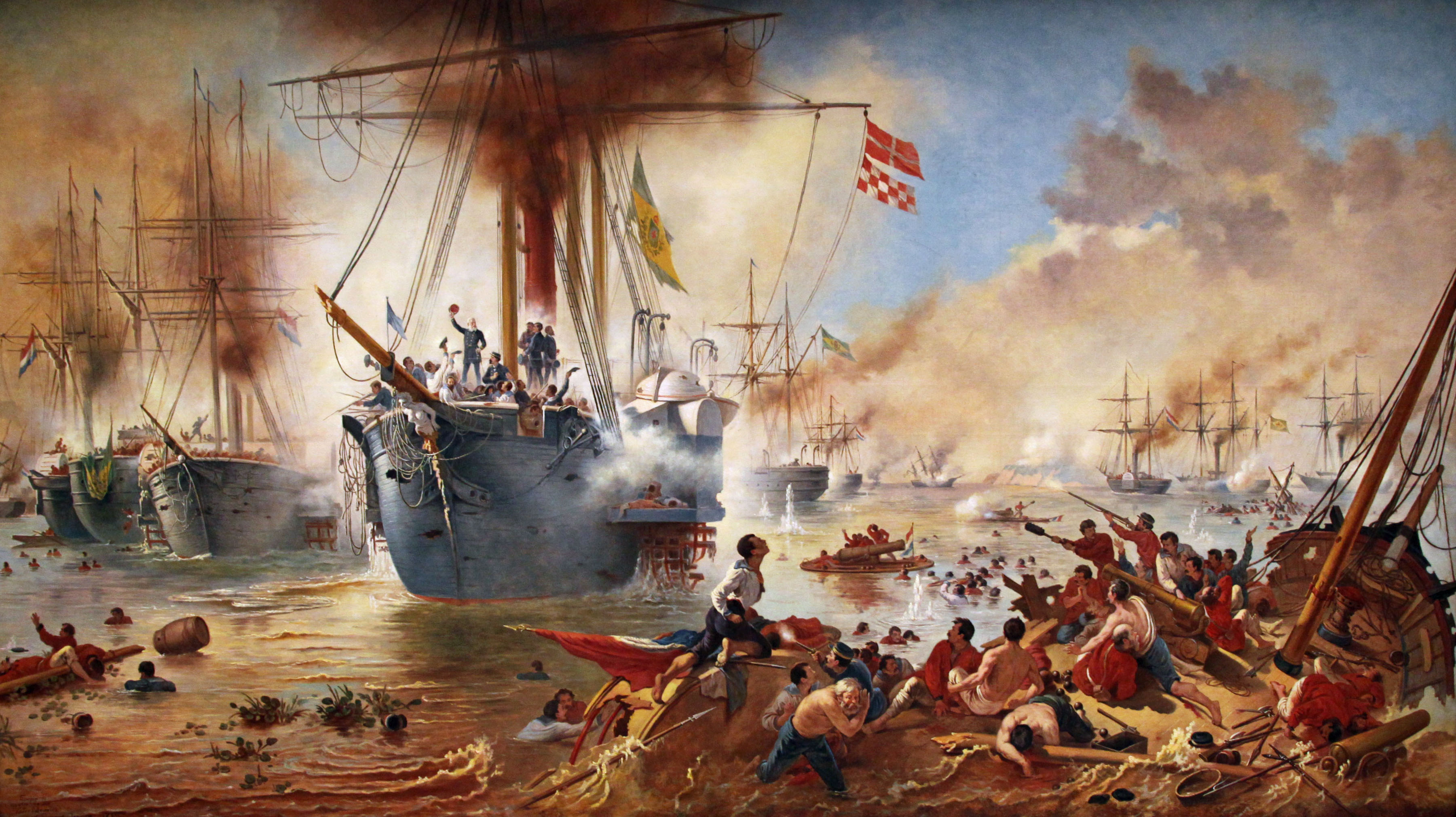
The Battle of Riachuelo by Victor Meirelles.
