= Maçambara =

Municipality of Rio Grande do Sul, Brazil

Maçambará
- Municipality
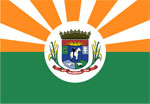
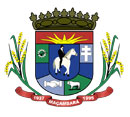
- Flag Coat of arms

- Map of the state of Rio Grande do Sul, Brazil highlighting Maçambará
- Coordinates: 29°8′34″S 56°3′54″W
- Country: Brazil
- Region: South
- State: Rio Grande do Sul
- Micro-region: Campanha Ocidental
- Founded: October 22, 1997

Area
  - Total: 1,682.82 km^{2} (649.74 sq mi)

Population (2020)
  - Total: 4,562
  - Density: 2.711/km^{2} (7.021/sq mi)
- Time zone: UTC−3 (BRT)
- Postal code: 97560-xxx
- Distance from the capital: 590 km (370 mi)
- Website: macambara.rs.gov.br

Maçambará is a small Brazilian municipality in the western part of the state of Rio Grande do Sul. The population is 4,562 (2020 est.) in an area of 1,682.82 km^{2}. Its elevation is 110 m. It is located west of the state capital of Porto Alegre and northeast of Alegrete.

The municipality contains part of the 4,392-hectare (10,850-acre) São Donato Biological Reserve, a strictly protected conservation unit created in 1975 that protects an area of wetlands on the Butuí River, a tributary of the Uruguay River.

== Neighbouring municipalities ==
- Itaqui
- São Borja
- Alegrete
- Unistalda
- São Francisco de Assis

== See also ==
- List of municipalities in Rio Grande do Sul
