= Montevideo Naval Division =

- Divisão Naval de Montevidéo
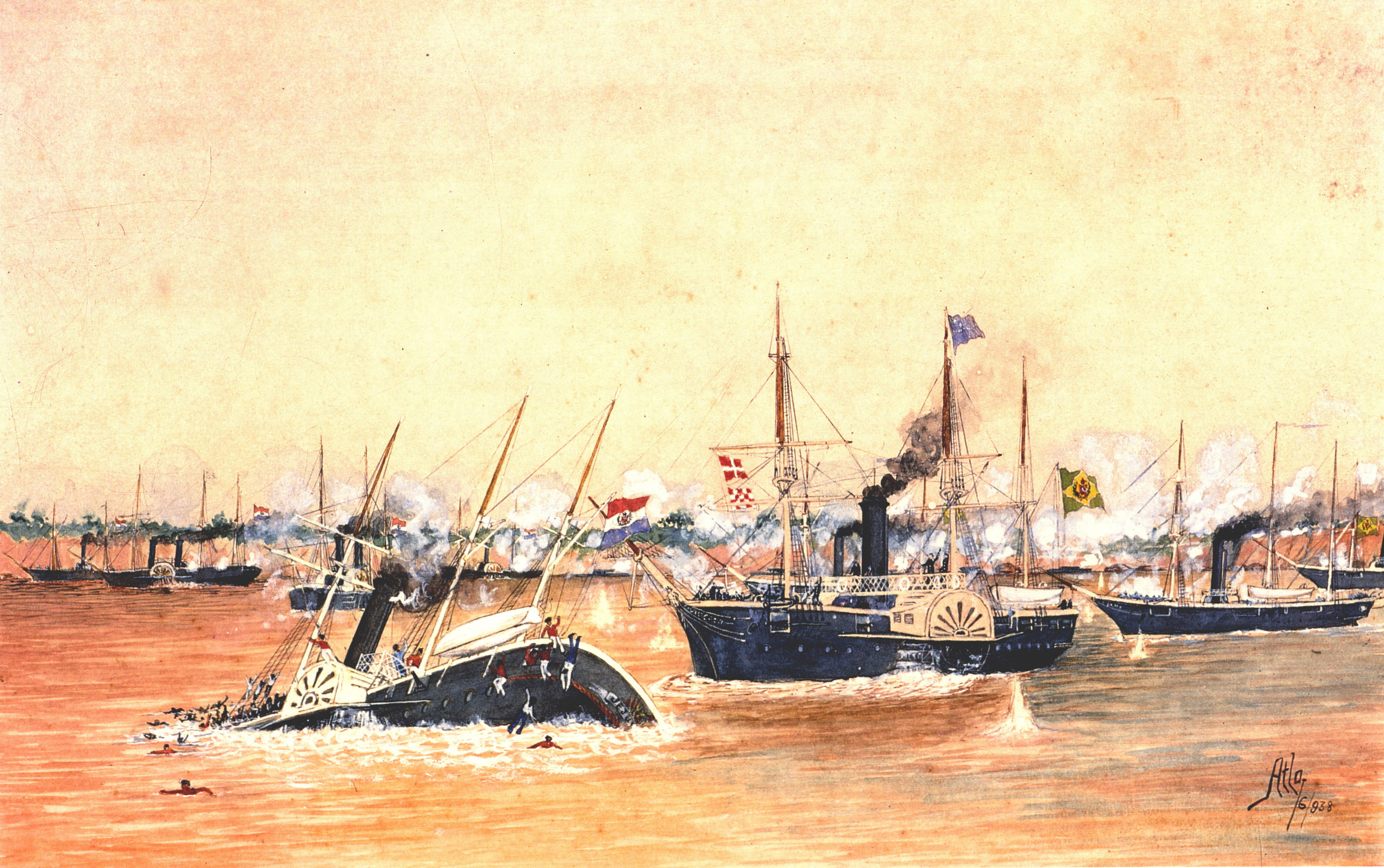
- The Brazilian frigate Amazonas rams and sinks the Paraguayan Jejuy.
- Active: 1851–1876
- Country: Empire of Brazil
- Branch: Imperial Brazilian Navy
- Type: Naval Division
- Garrison/HQ: Montevideo
- Engagements: Uruguayan War; Paraguayan War

Commanders
- Notable commanders: Marquis of Tamandaré; John Pascoe Grenfell; Baron of Amazonas

The Montevideo Naval Division or Rio da Prata Naval Division was a Brazilian naval division based at the Port of Montevideo and operating in Uruguay from 1851 to 1878.

It was created in compliance with article 4, of the Treaty of Alliance between Brazil and the Oriental Republic of Uruguay, which aimed to militarily assist in political stability after the Uruguayan Civil War.

The text of the treaty declared that the objective was to protect Uruguayan independence, pacify its territory, and expel Oribe's forces. Urquiza would command the Argentine forces and Eugenio Garzón would lead the Colorado Uruguayans, with both receiving financial and military aid from the Empire of Brazil.

The government of Montevideo rewarded Brazil's financial and military support at the final stages of the war by signing five treaties in 1851 that provided for perpetual alliance between the two countries.

== Origins ==
With independence of Paraguay and Uruguay secured, and the planned Argentine invasion of Rio Grande do Sul was blocked. In a period of three years, Brazil had destroyed any possibility of reconstituting a state encompassing the territories of the old Viceroyalty of the Río de la Plata, a goal cherished by many in Argentina since independence.

Brazil's army and fleet had accomplished what the United Kingdom and France, the great powers of that time, had not achieved through interventions by their powerful navies. This represented a watershed for the history of the region, ushering in Brazilian hegemony over the Platine region.

Once the political situation and territorial threats in the La Plata Basin stabilized in the 1870s, Uruguay ceased to be a matter of political concern for Brazil. On the other hand, the region also lost economic importance, as the internal agricultural frontier expanded and also Brazil's domestic industry, greatly benefited during the war years. The Naval Division was disbanded in 1876.

== Ships ==
In 1869, the Divisão Naval de Montevidéo was composed of:

Frigate
Amazonas (Flagship)

Corvettes
Vital de Oliveira
Beberibe
Patache
Iguassú

== See also ==
- Alto Uruguay Flotilla
