= São Donato Biological Reserve =

Biological reserve

- Reserva Biológica do São Donato
- Location within Brazil
- Location: Itaqui and Maçambara, Rio Grande do Sul, Brazil
- Nearest city: São Borja
- Coordinates: 29°01′11″S 56°10′23″W
- Area: 4,392 hectares (10,850 acres)
- Designation: Biological reserve
- Created: 1975

São Donato Biological Reserve (Portuguese: Reserva Biológica do São Donato) is a wetlands biological reserve established by the state of Rio Grande do Sul, Brazil.

== History ==
The biological reserve was created by decree in 1975 to support conservation of ecosystems, scientific research and environmental education. The reserve includes parts of the municipalities of Itaqui and Maçambara. It covers part of one of the last wetland areas of Rio Grande do Sul and is important for several endangered species. There was an ongoing struggle to make the reserve a reality. Implementation only began in 2001. The headquarters of the reserve were inaugurated in May 2002. In December 2003 the State Department of the Environment presented an environmental assessment and proposed limits for the reserve at a public hearing.

== Environment ==
The reserve is located along the lower courses of the Butuí River, a tributary of the Uruguay River, about 40 kilometres (25 mi) from São Borja. It takes up about 60% of the area of wetlands, with the remainder used for rice fields and flooded pastures. The wetlands hold a mosaic of tall, dense herbaceous plant communities, in which sedge Scirpus giganteus predominates, along with other marsh plants such as Cyperus giganteus (Cyperaceae), Thalia geniculata (Marantaceae), Panicum grumosum and Panicum prionitis (Poaceae).

The area is used for breeding by many aquatic birds, particularly maguari stork (Ciconia maguari) and snail kite (Rostrhamus sociabilis). Important bird species observed in the reserve include greater rhea (Rhea americana), sulphur-bearded reedhaunter (Limnoctites sulphuriferus), marsh seedeater (Sporophila palustris and Sporophila zelichi) and chestnut seedeater (Sporophila cinnamomea).

== Sources ==
- "Audiência pública discute limites da Reserva do São Donato", A EcoAgência (in Portuguese), 16 December 2003
- Banhado São Donato (in Portuguese), Birdlife International
- Inaugurado em São Borja Escritório da Reserva Biológica do São Donato, Secretaria do Ambiente e Desenvolvimento Sustentável do Rio Grande do Sul, 27 May 2002, archived from the original on 4 May 2016
