= Itaqui =

Municipality in Rio Grande do Sul, Brazil

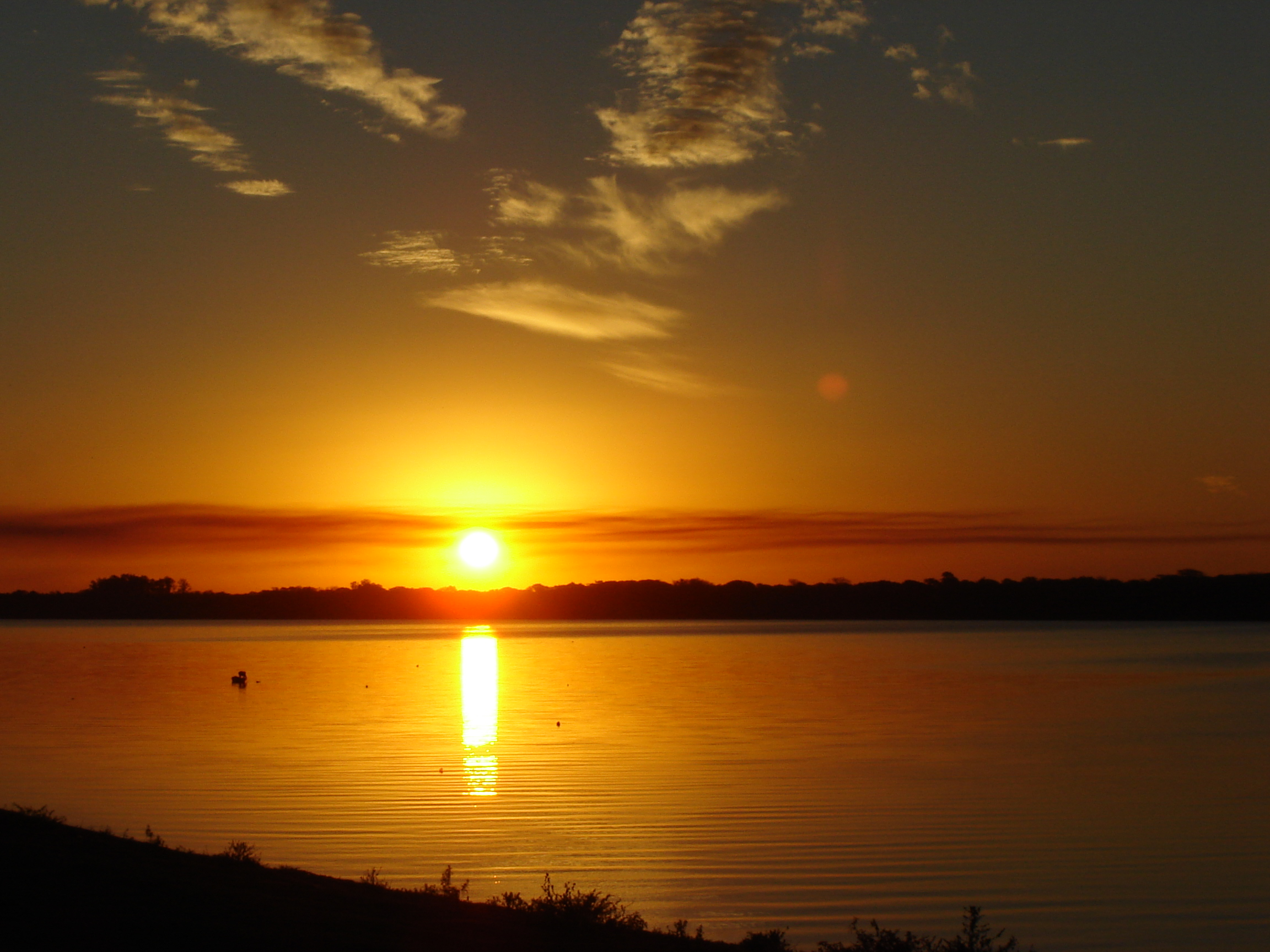
- A view of the Uruguay river from the port of Itaqui (Background: Alvear, Corrientes, Argentina)

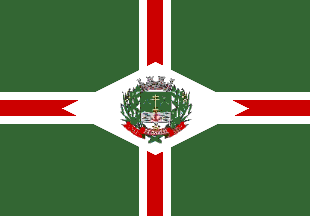
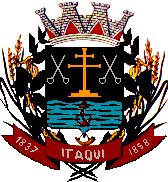
- Flag Coat of arms
- Nickname: The Portal of Rio Grande
- Itaqui's location in the state of Rio Grande do Sul
- Coordinates: 29°7′S 56°33′W
- Emancipated?: December 6, 1858

Government
  - Type: Prefecture
  - Mayor (Prefeito): Leonardo Dicson Sanchez Betin

Area
  - Total: 3,406 km^{2} (1,315 sq mi)
- Elevation: 57 m (187 ft)

Population (2020)
  - Total: 37,489
- Time zone: UTC−3 (BRT)
- CEP (Post Code): 97650-000
- Website: http://www.itaqui.rs.gov.br

Itaqui is a municipality in Brazil, located in the southwestern part of the state of Rio Grande do Sul, close to the Argentinian border, between Uruguaiana and São Borja. It sits at a mean altitude of 57 meters (187 ft), by the Uruguay River. Its population is currently estimated at 37,489.

== Geography ==
The municipality contains part of the 4,392-hectare (10,850-acre) São Donato Biological Reserve, a strictly protected conservation unit created in 1975 that protects an area of wetlands on the Butuí River, a tributary of the Uruguay River.

== Politics ==
The city's first mayor was Felipe Nery de Aguiar, (1896–1900).

== History ==
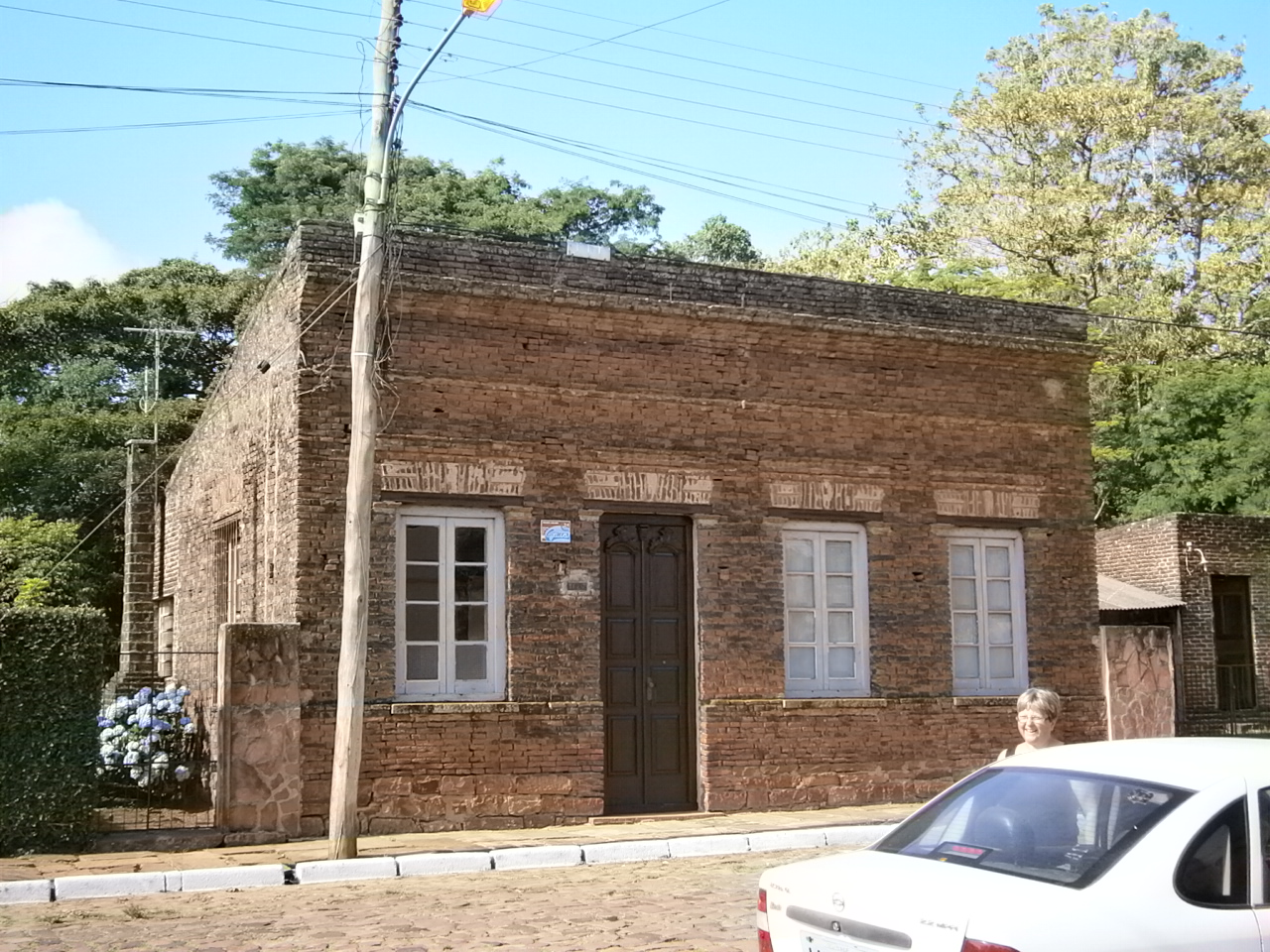

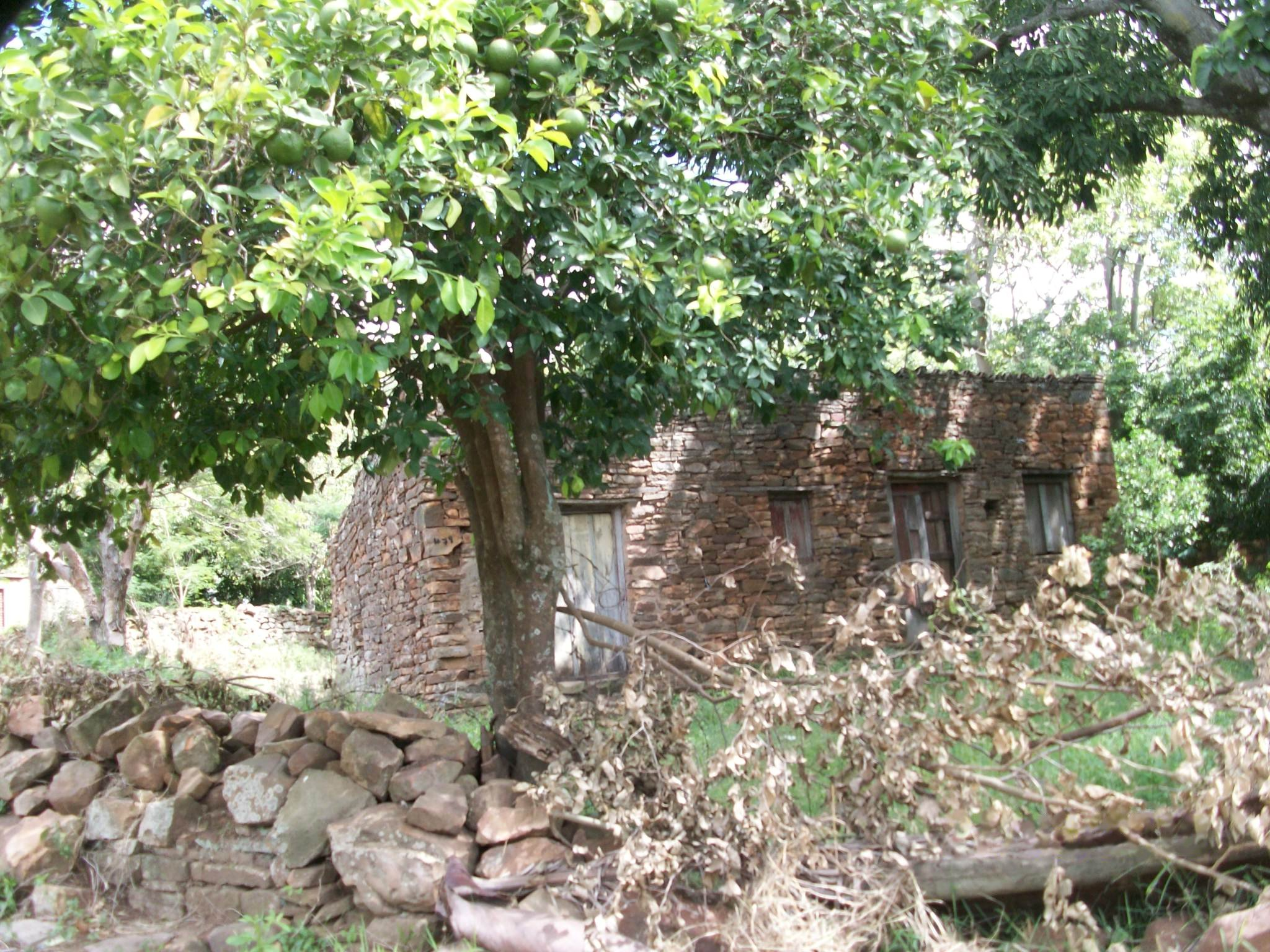
18th- to 19th-century-old house of Itaqui (demolished in 2011)

The city's inhabitant demonym is Itaquiense / Gaúcho. The city's patron saint is Saint Patrick.

== Arts ==
=== Theater Prezewodowski History ===
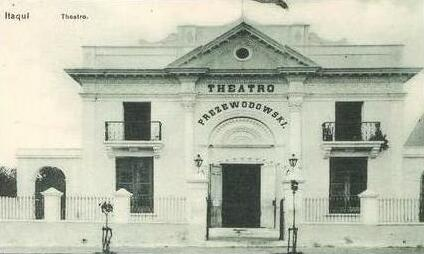
Theater Prezewodowski – 1911

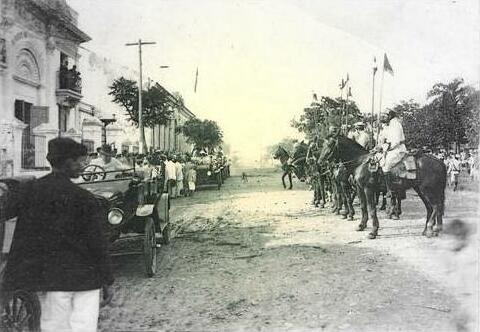
Theater Prezewodowski, prefecture and cavalry – 1930

Theatro Prezewodowski, or Teatro Prezewodowski, was built in 1883 and is one of the oldest in South America. It is constructed of masonry, with a façade 15 meters high—an important characteristic being the mobile auditorium, which, with a special mechanism, puts the main floor level with the stage, for balls and other types of events. The façade above the main entrance is decorated with an entrance porch with two Roman columns. Windows are on either side of this main entrance on the ground and first floor levels, and the first floor has two doors with fences of iron.

The name of the Theater is a hommage to Estanisláo Przewodowski, who fought in the Paraguayan War (1864–1870) and was of Polish-descendant, (he was born in Bahia) and then leader of the Flotilla of the High, Uruguay River, unit of the Brazilian Navy, that was anchored here in the waters of the Uruguay River in Itaqui, during approximately 40 years. The Prezewodowski Theater is situated in front of the "Square Marshal Deodoro da Fonseca" and at the side of the Municipal City hall.

During many years the theater had been the scene of stage plays of great international theatrical companies, that played in Brazil, in the axis Porto Alegre-São Paulo-Rio de Janeiro, and then going on to Buenos Aires and Montevideo. Due to the ease of the river travel, these European companies always played in Itaqui's Theater, giving to the city the nickname of "Small Paris." Not only the foreign companies were attractions at the Theater, the biggest names of the Brazilian stage also have played in it, such as Prócopio Ferreira, Maria de La Costa, Nicete Bruno, Wilson Grey, Vicente Celestino and others famous artists from Teatro Municipal (Rio de Janeiro).

With the advent of the Second World War, that prevented the coming of theatrical companies to Brazil, the Theater went into decay.

The city administered the Theater until 1928, when the cinematographic entrepreneur Manoel Barbosa leased it monthly for R$350,000 réis. In 1931, it was leased to another entrepreneur, Mr. Eduardo Corbacho for the equivalent 10% of the incomes of the spectacles, with a minimum guarantee of R$300,000 réis. In 1933 the company Contursi & Cia leased it for the monthly value of R$600,000 réis, with the obligation to make it function at least four times per month, on condition that solo artists or the city's artists played in it.

In 1942, the building was sold at public auction, as a result of an action moved by a shareholder, who desired to recover the value of capital that she had subscribed. The building was bought in the auction by the city's medic and politician Dr. Roque Degrazia, who later, for the same price that he had paid, sold it on to the city's administration, which is still today the owner of its patrimony.

== Notable people ==
- Nathercia da Cunha Silveira (1905–1993), suffragist, trade unionist and lawyer

== Economy ==
=== Agriculture ===
Itaqui is the second largest rice producer of the state, and CAMIL INC. is the largest rice producer of Latin America. It uses the brand name of CAMIL in rice, soya oil and beans that it produces. The company was created in Itaqui in the 60s, and has expanded its operations to São Paulo, Uruguay and the city of Camaquã and Maçambara.

Together with Itaqui's branch, JOSAPAR INC., from the city of Pelotas, it is the producer of 'TIO JOÃO' brand name rice and is the 2nd major rice industry of Latin America.

== Climate ==
Climate data for Itaqui (1976–2005)
Month	Jan	Feb	Mar	Apr	May	Jun	Jul	Aug	Sep	Oct	Nov	Dec	Year
Record high °C (°F)	37.9 (100.2)	36.1 (97.0)	35.4 (95.7)	33.2 (91.8)	28.7 (83.7)	27.6 (81.7)	28.2 (82.8)	31.8 (89.2)	31.3 (88.3)	34.4 (93.9)	36.5 (97.7)	37.4 (99.3)	37.9 (100.2)
Mean daily maximum °C (°F)	32.1 (89.8)	30.9 (87.6)	29.8 (85.6)	25.7 (78.3)	21.9 (71.4)	19.1 (66.4)	19.4 (66.9)	22.6 (72.7)	22.5 (72.5)	25.6 (78.1)	29.0 (84.2)	31.2 (88.2)	25.8 (78.5)
Daily mean °C (°F)	26.4 (79.5)	25.6 (78.1)	24.2 (75.6)	20.3 (68.5)	16.4 (61.5)	13.8 (56.8)	14.2 (57.6)	16.4 (61.5)	17.0 (62.6)	20.1 (68.2)	22.9 (73.2)	25.3 (77.5)	20.2 (68.4)
Mean daily minimum °C (°F)	20.6 (69.1)	20.3 (68.5)	18.7 (65.7)	15.0 (59.0)	10.8 (51.4)	8.5 (47.3)	9.0 (48.2)	10.3 (50.5)	11.5 (52.7)	14.6 (58.3)	16.9 (62.4)	19.4 (66.9)	14.6 (58.3)
Record low °C (°F)	14.3 (57.7)	14.8 (58.6)	11.6 (52.9)	7.9 (46.2)	4.1 (39.4)	0.1 (32.2)	0.7 (33.3)	1.9 (35.4)	4.2 (39.6)	8.2 (46.8)	10.5 (50.9)	12.9 (55.2)	0.1 (32.2)
Average precipitation mm (inches)	152.7 (6.01)	149.1 (5.87)	164.6 (6.48)	177.6 (6.99)	133.4 (5.25)	114.4 (4.50)	91.8 (3.61)	87.3 (3.44)	118.1 (4.65)	160.1 (6.30)	140.8 (5.54)	118.5 (4.67)	1,608.4 (63.31)
Average relative humidity (%)	75	76	76	82	82	87	81	76	78	74	73	75	78
Mean monthly sunshine hours	279	241	221	179	207	145	186	178	185	215	263	277	2,576
Source: Empresa Brasileira de Pesquisa Agropecuária (EMBRAPA)
