= Teatro Prezewodowski =

Theater in Itaqui, Brazil

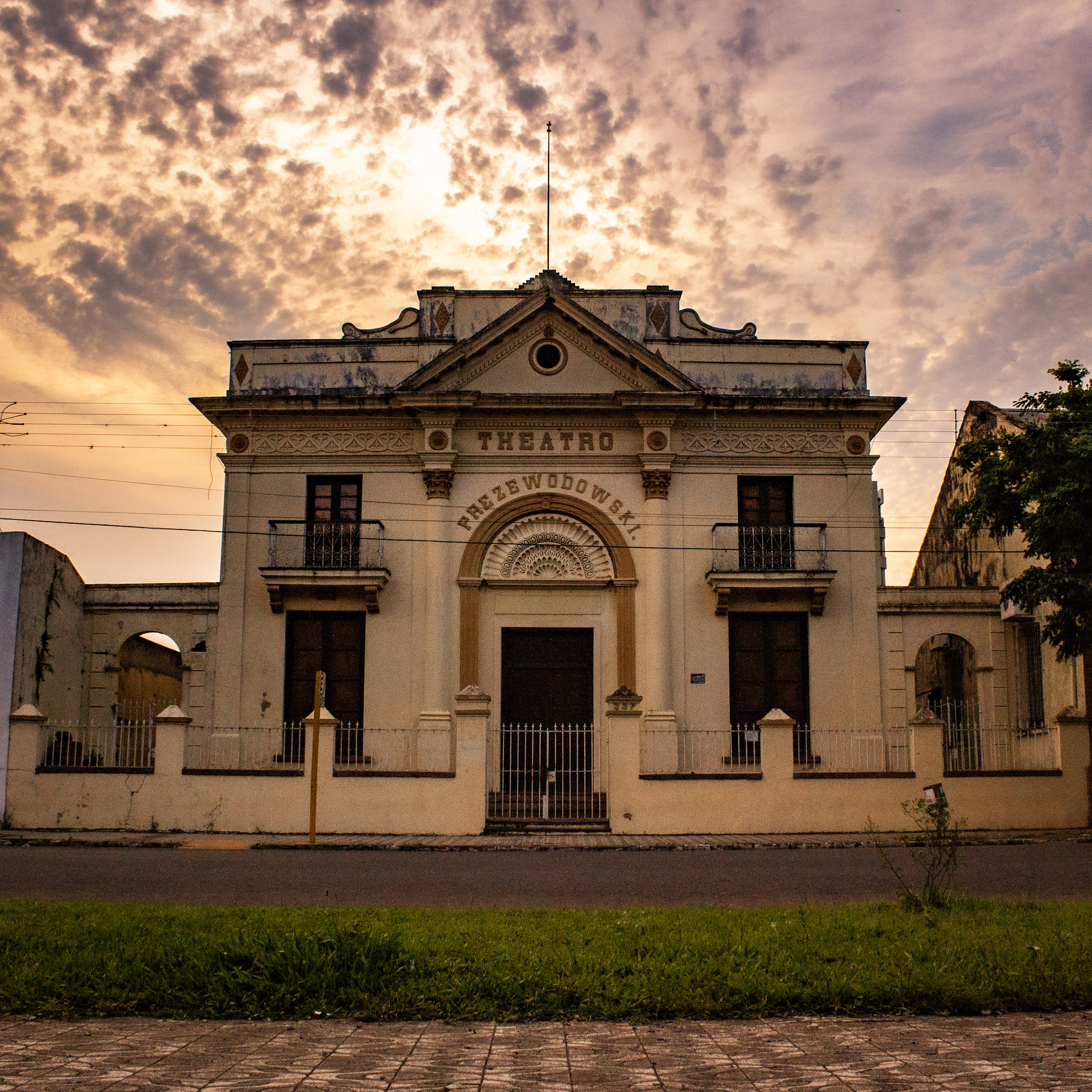
- Teatro Prezewodowski
- Interactive map of the Teatro Prezewodowski area

General information
- Location: R. Bento Gonçalves, 2313-2463; Centro, Itaqui, Brazil
- Coordinates: 29°7′17.65″S 56°33′25.91″W
- Opened: 1883; 143 years ago

Teatro Prezewodowski is one of oldest theaters in South America. It was built in 1883 at the town of Itaqui, Brazil.
