= Yhaguy River =

River in Paraguay

Coordinates: 25°11′S 56°48′W

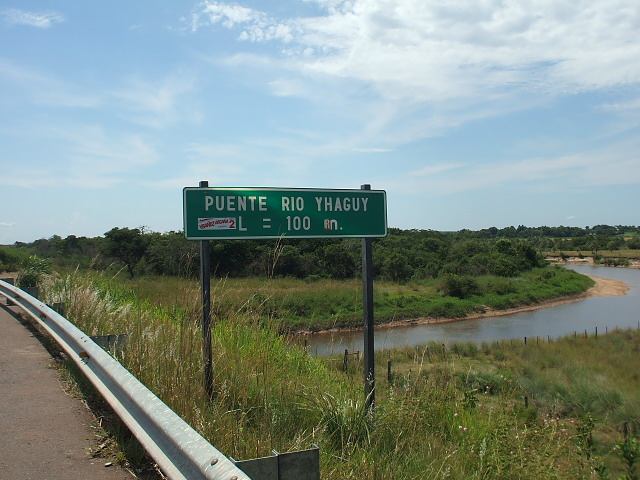
A bridge over the Río Yhaguy

The Yhagüy River (Spanish: Río Yhagüy) is a small river running north–south in Cordillera Department, Paraguay.

In places it is little more than a stream and is also known as Arroyo Yhaguy-Guazú and Arroyo Yhaguy)
