= 1950 in aviation =

This is a list of aviation-related events from 1950:

== Events ==
- Arrow Air is founded.
- The Piper Aircraft Corporation purchases the Stinson Aircraft Company
- The Brazilian Navy begins to reestablish an air arm of its own when an aeronautics directorate is created within the Ministry of the Navy.

=== January ===
- The Pan American Airways Corporation officially renames itself Pan American World Airways, the name the airline had begun to use for itself unofficially in 1943.
- January 3 – A Pan American Boeing 377 Stratocruiser makes the first commercial nonstop flight from Tokyo, Japan, to Honolulu, Hawaii.
- January 5 – Attempting to land at Koltsovo Airport at Sverdlovsk in the Soviet Union's Russian Soviet Federated Socialist Republic during a heavy snowstorm with high winds, a Soviet Air Force Lisunov Li-2 crashes, killing all 19 people on board. Almost the entire Soviet Air Force ice hockey team, VVS Moscow – 11 players, a team physician, and a masseur – dies in the crash.
- January 21 – A TAM–Transporte Aéreo Militar Douglas C-47 Skytrain (registration TAM-10) on a domestic flight in poor weather in Bolivia crashes near Vacas, killing all 32 people on board the aircraft and one woman on the ground.
- January 24 – A Société Transatlantique Aérienne (STA) Douglas C-47A-50-DL Skytrain (registration F-BFGD) on a domestic flight in Madagascar crashes into a 4,600-foot (1,400-meter) mountain 48 kilometers (30 miles) west of Tamatave, killing all 14 people on board.
- January 26 – A United States Air Force Strategic Air Command C-54D-1-DC Skymaster with 44 people on board disappears without trace over Canada's Yukon Territory near Snag during a flight from Elmendorf Air Force Base outside Anchorage, Territory of Alaska, to Great Falls Air Force Base in Cascade County, Montana. No wreckage or bodies are ever found.
- January 31
  - The U.S. Joint Chiefs of Staff estimate that the Soviet Union will have 10 to 20 atomic bombs by mid-1950 and 70 to 135 by mid-1953, and recommends that the United States Air Force's air defense capability in the United States be increased from 30 to 67 squadrons.
  - President of the United States Harry S. Truman announces that he has ordered the United States Government to develop the hydrogen bomb.

=== February ===
- Early February – A U.S. Weapon Systems Evaluation Group reports that the U.S. Air Force's Strategic Air Command would suffer heavy losses in an air offensive against the Soviet Union, with the most favorable assumptions allowing 70 to 85 percent of atomic bombs to be delivered to their targets. It estimates bomber losses of about 35 percent in night raids and 50 percent in daylight raids, and that the bombers could deliver the planned 292 atomic bombs called for in the initial attack but would suffer losses too high to allow the follow-on strikes with conventional bombs required by U.S. war plans.
- February 13 – A U.S. Air Force B-36B Peacemaker bomber participating in the first full-scale practice for a nuclear strike on the Soviet Union suffers the failure of all six of its engines during a mission to simulate a Soviet nuclear attack on San Francisco, California. The crew jettisons the Mark 4 atomic bomb the plane is carrying, which detonates over the Pacific Ocean in the first loss of a nuclear weapon, then bails out – which 12 of the 17 men on board survive – over Princess Royal Island, British Columbia, Canada, leaving the plane to fly on autopilot out over the Pacific Ocean and crash. Instead, some of its engines apparently recover power on their own, and the bomber flies unmanned for several hours and crashes on a remote mountainside in northern British Columbia; this remains unknown until it is discovered lying almost intact on the mountain in 1953.
- Mid-February – A U.S. military Joint Advanced Study Committee reports that the United States will have to rely heavily on atomic weapons in achieving its strategic objectives in a war with the Soviet Union, with early atomic strikes critical during a war. It finds that the U.S. Air Force will have to strike Soviet atomic bomb assembly and storage sites and Soviet Air Force long-range bomber bases early in a conflict to protect the United States from Soviet atomic attacks.
- Late February – The U.S. Joint Intelligence Committee reports that at the beginning of a war the Soviet Air Force could field 1,725 long-range bombers and 18,325 other aircraft and that the Soviet Navy could deploy 3,225 aircraft, while the United States Navy could deploy four fleet aircraft carriers off Europe. It notes that the U.S. Air Force has 14 bomber and 6 2/3 fighter groups.

=== March ===
- Sixty aircraft from the U.S. Navy aircraft carrier USS Boxer (CV-21) make a tight-formation flyover over Saigon in the State of Vietnam to encourage the population and government there to support the French in French Indochina and oppose the expansion of communism, beginning U.S. aid to the French in the region.
- March 7 – Northwest Orient Airlines Flight 307, a Martin 2-0-2, hits a flagpole and crashes into a house in Minneapolis, Minnesota, while on approach to Minneapolis–Saint Paul International Airport, killing all 13 people aboard the plane and two children in the house.
- March 12 – The Llandow air disaster occurs, as the Avro Tudor V airliner Star Girl (G-AKBY) on a private charter flight from Dublin, Ireland, crashes on final approach to Lladow aerodrome in South Wales. Three passengers survive, but 80 people (75 passengers and all five crew members) die in the worst aviation accident in history to that time.
- March 15 – The last operational prototype of the United States Air Force's Northrop YB-49 jet-powered flying wing bomber is destroyed when its nose gear collapses during high-speed taxiing tests simulating takeoff runs at Muroc Air Force Base, California. The incident brings the YB-49 bomber program to an end, although the U.S. Air Force continues development of the YRB-49A reconnaissance version of the aircraft.
- March 20 – The Royal Air Force sends Avro Lincoln bombers to Singapore for use against the Communist guerillas of Malaya in the Malayan Emergency.
- March 24 – Three CSA Czech Airlines Douglas DC-3 airliners carrying a combined 85 people are hijacked during domestic flights – one flying from Brno to Prague, one from Ostrava to Prague, and one from Bratislava to Prague – over Czechoslovakia and forced to fly to Erding Air Base in the American occupation zone in Allied-occupied Germany. Twenty-six of the people on board choose to remain in Germany rather than return to Czechoslovakia.
- March 25 – A Devlet Hava Yollari (DHY) Douglas C-47A-75-DL Skytrain (registration TC-BAL) crashes and catches fire on landing at Etimesgut Airport in Ankara, Turkey, killing all 15 people on board.
- March 28
  - A SEMAF Latécoère 631 flying boat (registration F-WANU) suffers a mechanical failure and crashes into the Atlantic Ocean off Cap Ferret, France, during a test flight, killing all 12 people on board.
  - A Douglas C-47 Skytrain on a United States Embassy flight from Ottawa, Ontario, Canada, to Washington, D.C., catches fire in mid-air and crashes on a snow-covered farm near Ramsayville, Ontario. One man parachutes to safety, and but the other five people on board are killed, including United States Ambassador to Canada Laurence Steinhardt.

=== April ===
- April 5 – To demonstrate support for the government of Synghman Rhee in South Korea, the U.S. Navy aircraft carrier USS Boxer (CV-21) arrives in the Yellow Sea off Inchon, South Korea, and flies her F9F Panther, F4U Corsair, and AD Skyraider aircraft over the city in a show of strength.
- April 8 – A Soviet Lavochkin La-11 (NATO reporting name "Fang") fighter shoots down a United States Navy PB4Y Privateer maritime patrol aircraft over the Baltic Sea. The Privateer's entire crew of 10 men dies.
- April 10 – A Royal Pakistan Air Force Douglas C-47 Skytrain crashes into a mountain near Suberi in Rajasthan, Pakistan, killing all 12 people on board.
- April 11 – A United States Air Force B-29 Superfortress carrying a nuclear bomb and four spare detonators for it crashes into a mountain near Manzano Base three minutes after takeoff from Kirtland Air Force Base in Albuquerque, New Mexico, starting a fire visible for 15 miles (24 km) and killing its entire crew of 13. The bomb is damaged, but all nuclear components and the detonators are recovered.
- April 18 – The world's first flight by a turboprop-powered flying boat takes place, when the U.S. Navy's Convair XP5Y-1, prototype of the R3Y Tradewind, flies for the first time at San Diego, California.
- April 21 – Forty kilometers (25 miles) off course during a flight from Kadena Air Base on Okinawa to Tachikawa Airfield in Tokyo, Japan, a U.S. Air Force Douglas C-54D-10-DC Skymaster crashes into the side of 1,279-meter (4,196-foot) Mount Hirugatake, killing all 35 people on board. It is the second-deadliest aviation accident in Japanese history at the time.

=== May ===
- May 2 – An Avianca Douglas C-47-DL Skytrain on a domestic flight in Ecuador crashes in mountainous terrain just north of Chimborazo near Simiatug, killing all 15 people on board. Its wreckage is discovered on May 4.
- May 17 – Transcontinental and Western Air changes its name to Trans World Airlines.
- May 24 – A Limitada Nacional de Servicio Aéreo Douglas C-47A-55-DL Skytrain crashes into the stratovolcano Galeras just west of Pasto, Colombia, killing 26 of the 27 people on board. The only survivor is a 10-year-old girl.
- May 30 – After an Aerovias Brasil Douglas C-47-DL Skytrain (registration PP-AVZ) begins a descent from 10,000 feet (3,000 meters) through clouds, it encounters severe turbulence that causes the displacement of passengers and cargo. The crew loses control of the aircraft, which enters a dive too steep for its design limits, loses both its wings, and crashes near Ilhéus, Brazil, killing 13 of the 15 people on board.

=== June ===
- During the month, Overseas National Airways is founded.
- June 1
  - British European Airways commences the first regular passenger service to be flown by helicopter, between Liverpool and Cardiff.
  - Arizona Airways, Challenger Airlines, and Monarch Airlines merge to form Frontier Airlines.
- June 5 – After both its engines overheat during an evening flight from San Juan, Puerto Rico, to Wilmington, North Carolina, a Westair Transport Curtiss C-46F Commando ditches in the Atlantic Ocean 480 kilometers (300 miles) east of Melbourne, Florida. Twenty-eight passengers die, but all three crew members and the other 34 passengers make it into life rafts. The next day, they are found by a United States Coast Guard aircraft and rescued by the United States Navy destroyer USS Saufley (DD-465).
- June 9 – During a flight from Kingston, Jamaica, to Maracaibo, Venezuela, a New Tribes Mission Douglas DC-3 (registration N16030) strikes a tree about 15 feet (4.6 meters) above the ground on a mountaintop in the Serrania de Valledupar Range, loses parts of both its wings, crashes inverted at an elevation of 4,400 feet (1,300 meters) near the top of a mountain 31 kilometers (19 miles) east-northeast of Fonseca, Colombia, and catches fire, killing all 15 people on board. Its wreckage is not discovered until July 6.
- June 12 – The Air France Douglas DC-4 Ciel de Picardie crashes into the Persian Gulf southeast of Bahrain while on approach to land there after a flight from Karachi, killing 46 of the 52 people on board.
- June 13 – The prototype of the Cierva W.11 Air Horse helicopter (registration G-ALCV) crashes at Eastleigh, Hampshire, England, due to a transmission failure, killing all three people on board. Cierva Autogiro Company chief test pilot Alan Marsh is among the dead.
- June 14 – The Air France Douglas DC-4 Ciel de Gascogne crashes into the Persian Gulf southeast of Bahrain while on approach to land there after a flight from Karachi, killing 40 of the 53 people on board. The crash occurs within a mile (1.6 km) of the virtually identical Air France crash two days earlier.
- June 19 – The U.S. Navy Martin JRM-2 Mars flying boat Caroline Mars sets a new record for the number of passengers carried in a single aircraft over the Pacific Ocean, carrying 144 men on a 2,609-mile (4,201 km) flight from San Diego, California, to Honolulu, Hawaii.
- June 23 – Northwest Orient Airlines Flight 2501, a Douglas DC-4, crashes into Lake Michigan 18 miles (29 km) north-northwest of Benton Harbor, Michigan, after entering a squall line and turbulence, killing all 58 people on board. It is the deadliest commercial airliner accident in American history at the time.
- June 24 – U.S. President Harry Truman dedicates Friendship International Airport – the future Baltimore–Washington International Airport – in Baltimore, Maryland.
- June 25
  - The Korean War breaks out as North Korea invades South Korea. The North Korean Air Force totals 210 mostly obsolete Soviet-made planes. The South Korean Air Force has 16 planes, 13 of them observation aircraft.
  - The United States Air Force begins evacuating American citizens from South Korea.
- June 26 – The Australian National Airways Douglas DC-4 Amana crashes northwest of York, Western Australia, killing all 29 people on board. It is the second-deadliest aviation accident and deadliest civil aviation accident in Australian history at the time.
- June 27
- Flying a [Lockheed F-80C] U.S. Air Force [1st Lieutenant] [Robert "Bob" E Wayne] shoots down 2 North Korean Air Force [Soviet made] Ilyushin-2 Shturmovik fighters in the first American Jet victories
  - Flying a North American F-82 Twin Mustang, U.S. Air Force Lieutenant William G. "Skeeter" Hudson shoots down a North Korean Air Force Yakovlev Yak-9, the first air-to-air kill of the Korean War.
  - U.S. Air Force B-29 Superfortresses of the 19th Bombardment Group attack Seoul railway station and the bridge over the Han River in the first strategic bombing mission of the Korean War.
  - U.S. Air Force C-47 Skytrains and C-54 Skymasters evacuate U.S. nationals from Korea.
  - Japan-based PBM-5 Mariners of Patrol Squadron 47 (VP-47) begin the first U.S. Navy maritime air patrols of the Korean War.
- June 28 – U.S. Air Force B-26 Invaders fly the first United Nations strike mission into North Korea.
- June 29 – Eight C-47 Skytrain cargo aircraft cross the Pacific Ocean from the United States to French Indochina to deliver the first American military aid to French forces fighting against the Vietminh in the First Indochina War.
- June 30
  - A U.S. Air Force Douglas C-54D Skymaster crashes into a 2,000-foot (610-meter) high hill northwest of Pusan, South Korea, killing all 23 people on board.
  - F-51 Mustangs of the Royal Australian Air Force's No. 77 Squadron are sent to Korea as part of Australia's contribution to the United Nations forces in the Korean War.
  - Prototype four-engined SNCASE Armagnac airliner crashes at Toulouse Airport, France killing two.

=== July ===
- July 1 – The United States Air Force disestablishes its Air Defense Command.
- July 3–4 – Aircraft from the U.S. Navy aircraft carrier USS Valley Forge (CV-45) make the first U.S. carrier strikes since World War II ended on 15 August 1945, with F4U Corsairs, AD Skyraiders, and F9F Panthers hitting targets around Pyongyang, North Korea. The F9Fs of Fighter Squadron 51 (VF-51) become the first U.S. jet fighters to go into combat, destroying three enemy aircraft on the ground in their first strike on July 3. They also shoot down two North Korean Yak-9 fighters; Lieutenant junior grade Leonard H. Plog becomes the first U.S. Navy jet pilot to score an aerial victory. It is the combat debut for both the Skyraider and the Panther. On July 3, Supermarine Seafires of 800 Naval Air Squadron and Fairey Fireflys of 827 Naval Air Squadron from HMS Triumph fly the first non-U.S. sorties over Korea, striking Haeju.
- July 4 – Seafires and Fireflies from Triumph strike targets of opportunity in Korea, including a railway bridge and a column of North Korean troops.
- July 5 – Bahrain-based Gulf Aviation, the forerunner of Gulf Air, begins flight operations. With a fleet of seven Avro Ansons and one de Havilland DH.86B Express, it offers service from Bahrain to Doha in Qatar and to Sharjah in the Trucial States.
- July 6 – U.S. Navy Patrol Squadron 46 (VP-46), based at Buckner Bay, Okinawa, begins maritime air patrols of the Taiwan Strait and coast of China to guard against any People's Republic of China action against Taiwan while the Korean War is raging.
- July 8 – U.S. Navy Lockheed P2V-3 Neptunes of Patrol Squadron 6 (VP-6) begin air patrols along the east coast of Korea.
- July 9 – An Aigle Azur Douglas C-47A Skytrain (registration F-BFGL) crashes during its initial climb after takeoff from Casablanca-Cazes Airport in Casablanca, Morocco, killing 22 of the 29 people on board.
- July 13 – A U.S. Air Force B-50 Superfortress carrying a nuclear bomb crashes near Lebanon, Ohio, during a training mission. High-explosive components of the bomb detonate, but no nuclear explosion occurs.
- July 16 – Okinawa-based U.S. Navy PB4Y-2 Privateers of Patrol Squadron 28 (VP-28) begin patrols of the coast of the People's Republic of China.
- July 17 – An Indian National Airways Douglas C-47A Skytrain (registration VT-ATS) loses its left wing in flight due to severe turbulence and crashes southeast of Pathankot, India, killing all 22 people on board.
- July 18
  - A Direcção de Exploração dos Transportes Aéreos (DTA) Douglas C-47A Skytrain (registration CR-LBK) crashes into Bulobulo Mountain near Bocoio, Angola, during its approach to Lobito Airport in Lobito, Angola, in bad weather and poor visibility, killing all 12 people on board.
  - The Peruvian Aviation Corps is reorganized to become the Peruvian Air Force.
- July 18–19 – AD Skyraiders and F4U Corsairs from the aircraft carrier USS Valley Forge (CV-45) make the first naval air strikes along the east coast of Korea, hitting targets from near Pyonggang and Wonsan north to Hungnam and Hamhung, striking railroads, industrial plants, and airfields. At Wonsan, Skyraiders completely destroy an oil refinery, which burns for days. Aircraft from HMS Triumph provide a combat air patrol and antisubmarine patrols for Task Force 77 during the strikes.
- July 22 – AD Skyraiders and F4U Corsairs from the aircraft carrier USS Valley Forge (CV-45) strike targets near Haeju and Inchon, Korea,
- July 23
  - Ferrying 150 U.S. Air Force North American F-51 Mustang fighters to Japan, the U.S. Navy aircraft carrier USS Boxer (CV-21) crosses the Pacific Ocean in record time, steaming from Alameda, California, to Yokosuka, Japan, in 8 days 16 hours.
  - A U.S. Air Force Curtiss C-46D Commando (serial number 44–77577) loses its left aileron during its initial climb out of Myrtle Beach Air Force Base, causing its crew to lose control of it at an altitude of between 1,000 and 2,000 feet (300 and 610 meters). Both of the C-46D's wings fail, and it crashes just west of Myrtle Beach, South Carolina, killing all 39 people on board.
- July 24 – An Israeli Air Force Spitfire fighter opens fire on an Air Liban Douglas DC-3 (registration LR-AAN) flying from Jerusalem to Beirut, Lebanon, with 28 passengers and a crew of three on board. The attack kills three passengers, but the airliner lands safely at Beirut Airport.
- July 25 – Near the Lebanese-Israeli border, an Israeli military aircraft fires on a Middle East Airlines Douglas Dakota aircraft flying from Jerusalem to Beirut, killing the Dakota's radio operator, Antoine Wazir, in his seat in the cockpit.
- July 27 – A U.S. Air Force Douglas C-47D Skytrain (serial number 44–76439) crashes into the sea 60 Miles ENE of Haneda Air Base, Japan, 20 minutes after taking off from Haneda in Tokyo, killing 25 of the 26 people on board.
- July 28
  - A U.S. Air Force B-29 Superfortress mistakenly shoots down a British Fleet Air Arm Supermarine Seafire of 800 Naval Air Squadron from HMS Triumph off Korea, apparently mistaking it for a Yakovlev Yak-9.
  - Encountering bad weather and a low ceiling, a Panair do Brasil Lockheed L-049 Constellation (registration PP-PCG) aborts an attempted landing at Canoas Air Force Base at Canoas, Brazil. As the crew attempts to maintain visual contact with the ground while circling for another landing attempt, the aircraft strikes the 200-meter (660-foot) hill Morro do Chapéu and crashes, killing all 51 people on board. At the time it is both the deadliest aviation accident in Brazilian history and the deadliest accident involving the Lockheed L-049.
- July 29
  - A BEA Vickers Viscount makes the first turboprop-powered passenger flight on the route London(Northolt)-Paris(Le Bourget).
  - The starboard wing fuel tank of a Compagnie Air Transport (CAT) Bristol 170 Freighter 21 (registration F-BENF) explodes in flight, leading to multiple structural failures. The aircraft crashes in the Tanezrouft area of French Algeria, killing all 26 people on board. At the time it is the deadliest aviation accident in the history of Algeria.
- July 30
  - An Aeroflot Ilyushin Il-12 (registration CCCP-L1803) suffers an engine failure just after takeoff from Karaganda Airport in Karaganda in the Soviet Union's Kazakh Soviet Socialist Republic and crashes while attempting to return to the airport, killing all 25 people on board. The aircraft had suffered engine trouble previously, but a crew performing a test flight the previous day at Alma-Ata to see whether maintenance had corrected the problem had failed to report that engine trouble persisted after the attempted repairs. At the time it is the deadliest aviation accident in the history of Kazakhstan.
  - Attempting to divert from São Borja Airport to Santa Maria Airport due to poor weather during a domestic flight in Brazil, a SAVAG (Sociedade Anônima Viação Aérea Gaúcha) Lockheed 18–10 Lodestar (registration PP-SAA) strikes a hill near São Francisco de Assis, crashes and burns, killing all 12 people on board. Brazilian politician and former aviation minister Joaquim Pedro Salgado Filho is among the dead.
- July 31 – U.S. Navy aircraft have flown 716 combat and 431 patrol sorties over and around Korea since July 1, most of them by aircraft from the aircraft carrier USS Valley Forge (CV-45). U.S. Navy aviators have claimed 26 enemy aircraft destroyed and 13 probably destroyed during the period, and have destroyed numerous tanks, locomotives, power stations, and bridges. In exchange, the U.S. Navy has lost six aircraft and one aviator.

=== August ===
- United States Navy helicopters enter combat for the first time. Operating from the heavy cruiser USS Helena (CA-75), they principally are assigned to spotting for naval gunfire.
- The U.S. Navy's Convair XP5Y-1, prototype of the R3Y Tradewind, sets a world endurance record for a turboprop-powered aircraft, remaining aloft for 8 hours 6 minutes. It covers 3,450 miles (5,550 km) during the flight.
- Birth of Yang Yuanyuan, Chinese aviation safety regulator.
- Early August – From the Yellow Sea, aircraft from the U.S. Navy aircraft carriers USS Philippine Sea (CV-47) and USS Valley Forge (CV-45) strike targets south of the 38th parallel in Korea.
- August 3 – United States Marine Corps air operations over Korea commence, with Marine Fighter Squadron 214 (VMF-214) flying strike missions from USS Sicily (CVE-118). They are the first strikes launched from an escort aircraft carrier during the Korean War.
- August 5 – Suffering propeller malfunctions on two engines and problems with retracting its landing gear after taking off from Fairfield-Suisun Air Force Base in Fairfield, California, for a flight to Guam, a United States Air Force B-29 Superfortress carrying a Mark 4 nuclear bomb crashes while attempting an emergency landing at Fairfield-Suisun and catches fire. The fire causes the bomb's high-explosive material to detonate, although no nuclear explosion occurs. The crash, fire, and explosion kill 19 rescue personnel and members of the bomber's crew, including its command pilot, Brigadier General Robert F. Travis. The base will be renamed Travis Air Force Base in his honor.
- August 11 – Two hijackers commandeer a CSA Czech Airlines airliner and force it to land near Aichach, West Germany.
- August 12 – U.S. Air Force F-51 Mustang aircraft are forced to abandon the airfield at Pohang, Korea, due to North Korean People's Army attacks against it. They return to Japan.
- August 20 – The Soviet Union terminates the Ilyushin Il-30 program.
- August 22 – The U.S. Joint Intelligence Committee estimates that the Soviet Union has 20 atomic bombs and will have 165 by 1953.
- August 27 – F-51 Mustangs of the South African Air Force's No. 2 Squadron are sent to Korea as part of South Africa's contribution to United Nations forces in the Korean War.
- August 31
  - Late in the evening, North Korean troops launch a heavy assault on the Pusan Perimeter. Aircraft from the U.S. Navy aircraft carriers USS Philippine Sea (CV-47) and USS Valley Forge (CV-45) provide support to defending forces.
  - After a major fire breaks out in the No. 3 engine of Trans World Airlines Flight 903 – the Lockhead L-749A Constellation Star of Maryland (registration N6004C) – during a flight from Cairo to Rome, the crew attempts to return to Cairo, but the fire worsens and the engine detaches from the aircraft. The crew then attempts a crash-landing in the Libyan Desert, but the aircraft crashes near Wadi El Natrun, Egypt, killing all 55 people on board. Among the dead are architect Maciej Nowicki and an Egyptian film star. It is the worst accident in history involving a Lockheed L-749, and at the time it is the deadliest aviation accident in Egyptian history.

=== September ===
- The U.S. Joint Chiefs of Staff report that the North Atlantic Treaty Organization (NATO) requires an additional 8,636 aircraft for tactical and defensive operations if NATO is engage in a successful defense forward of the Rhine River against a Soviet offensive.
- September 4
  - After United States Air Force Captain Robert Wayne, an F-80 Shooting Star pilot, is shot down during a strafing mission in Korea north of Pohang, a U.S. Air Force Sikorsky H-5 helicopter piloted by First Lieutenant Paul W. van Boven rescues him. Wayne becomes the first pilot to be rescued from behind enemy lines by a helicopter.
  - During U.S. Navy carrier air strikes on targets north of Inchon, Korea, four F4U Corsair fighter-bombers from the aircraft carrier USS Valley Forge (CV-45) intercept a twin-engine bomber approaching Task Force 77 off Korea and Lieutenant, junior grade, Richard Downs shoots it down over the Yellow Sea after it opens fire on them. A Soviet aviator's body is recovered from the water, demonstrating direct Soviet air participation in the Korean War for the first time.
  - Suffering an engine failure just after takeoff from Oneida County Airport outside Utica, New York, Robinson Airlines Flight 32 – a Douglas DC-3–229 (registration N18936) – crashes into a grove of trees, killing 16 of the 23 people on board.
- September 5 – To divert enemy attention from the upcoming Inchon landing, U.S. Air Force bombers begin strikes on bridges and roads around Kunsan, Korea. To contribute to the deception over the next few days, carrier aircraft from USS Badoeng Strait (CVE-116) and HMS Triumph (R16) strike roads and bridges to the north of Kunsan, and aircraft from USS Valley Forge (CV-45) and USS Philippine Sea (CV-47) attack targets between Seoul and Pyongyang.
- September 6 – A U.S. Air Force Douglas C-54D-5-DC Skymaster crashes just after takeoff from Itami Airport in Osaka, Japan, killing all 11 people on board. Three International News Service journalists are among the dead.
- September 8 – The first air launch of a Douglas Skyrocket research aircraft takes place. Bill Bridgeman pilots the aircraft, which is launched from a U.S. Navy Boeing P2B-1S Superfortress.
- September 10, 13, and 14 – United Nations carrier aircraft soften up targets in the Inchon area in preparation for the landing there.
- September 15 – Task Force 77, centered on five U.S. Navy aircraft carriers and one Royal Navy carrier, supports the U.S. Marine Corps assault on Green Beach, paving the way for the Inchon landing.
- September 17 – The only North Korean Air Force response to the Inchon landing takes place, when two Yakovlev Yak-9 fighters attack the U.S. Navy heavy cruiser USS Rochester (CA-124) and Royal Navy light cruiser HMS Jamaica off Inchon. They hit Rochester's aircraft crane with a 50 kg (110 lb) bomb that fails to explode and score seven near-misses, killing one man aboard Jamaica. Jamaica shoots one of them down.
- September 19 – A U.S. Navy Douglas R5D-3 Skymaster crashes into the Pacific Ocean just after takeoff from Dyess Army Airfield on Roi-Namur in Kwajalein Atoll, killing all 26 people on board.
- September 21
  - A Jat Airways Douglas C-47A-25-DK Skytrain crashes on landing at Lučko Airport in Lučko in the Socialist Federal Republic of Yugoslavia, killing 10 of the 11 people on board.
  - A Bell 47 becomes the first helicopter to fly over the Alps.
- September 22 – U.S. Air Force Colonel David Schilling makes the first non-stop crossing of the Atlantic Ocean in a jet fighter, flying a Republic EF-84E Thunderjet from the United Kingdom to the United States in 10 hours 2 minutes with three aerial refuelings. The flight demonstrates that large numbers of fighters could be moved quickly across the Atlantic.
- September 26 – A U.S. Air Force Douglas C-54D-1-DC Skymaster taking part in the airlift of troops and supplies to Korea crashes into the sea just after takeoff from Ashiya Air Field in Ashiya, Japan, killing 23 of the 51 people on board.
- September 28 – Gulf Aviation, the forerunner of Gulf Air, inaugurates service between Bahrain and Dhahran, Saudi Arabia.

=== October ===
- Soviet Mikoyan-Gurevich MiG-15s from the 29th Fighter Aviation Regiment are supplied to support the North Korean Air Force. They are flown by Soviet and Chinese pilots.
- October 1 – The Royal Danish Air Force is re-established.
- October 3 – A U.S. Navy HO3S-1 helicopter from the light cruiser USS Worcester (CL-144) is assigned to assist minesweepers clearing the harbor at Wonsan, Korea. It is the first time helicopters assist in naval minesweeping.
- October 13 – A Northwest Orient Airlines Martin 2-0-2 crashes at Almelund, Minnesota, during a training flight, killing six people.
- October 14 – The U.S. Navy aircraft carrier USS Boxer (CV-21) joins the aircraft carriers USS Leyte (CV-32), USS Valley Forge (CV-45), and USS Philippine Sea (CV-47) in Task Force 77 off Korea. It is the first time since 1945 that four Essex-class aircraft carriers have operated together.
- October 17 – After mechanical problems force its crew to shut down one engine just after takeoff from Northolt Airport in London, a British European Airways Douglas C-47A-1-DK Dakota C.3 attempts to return to the airport. It strikes trees and crashes at Mill Hill, killing 28 of the 29 people on board.
- October 20 – U.S. paratroops cut off supplies from Pyongyang, Korea.
- October 31 – The British European Airways Vickers VC.1 Viking Lord St. Vincent (G-AHPN) crashes while landing in thick fog at London Airport, killing 28 of the 30 people on board.

=== November ===
- November 1 – In the Korean War, United States Air Force F-51 Mustang fighters report coming under fire by Soviet-built MiG-15 jet fighters. It is the first encounter between United Nations forces and the MiG-15.
- November 3 – The Lockheed L-749A Constellation Malabar Princess, operating as Air India Flight 245, crashes on Mont Blanc in France, killing all 48 people on board. In 1966, Air India Flight 101 will crash in almost exactly the same spot.
- November 7
  - BOAC retires its last flying boat airliner from service.
  - On approach to Butte Municipal Airport in Butte, Montana, Northwest Orient Airlines Flight 115 – a Martin 2-0-2 (registration N93040) – crashes into a ridge 30 feet (9.1 meters) below its crest at an altitude of 8,250 feet (2,510 meters) 2 1/2 miles (4.0 kilometers) from the airport control tower, killing all 21 people on board.
- November 8 – In the Korean War, the first jet-vs.-jet combat in history takes place, between United States Air Force F-80C Shooting Stars escorting B-29 Superfortress bombers and Soviet-made MiG-15s. U.S. Air Force First Lieutenant Russell Brown shoots down a MiG-15, the first victory by a jet over another jet.
- November 9 – Flying an F9F Panther, United States Navy Lieutenant Commander William T. Armen shoots down a MiG-15. It is the first victory by a U.S. Navy jet over another jet.
- November 9–20 – U.S. Navy AD Skyraiders and F4U Corsairs from the aircraft carriers USS Valley Forge (CV-45) and USS Philippine Sea (CV-47) attempt to destroy railroad and highway bridges across the Yalu River. They destroy the highway bridge at Sinuiju and two bridges at Hysanjin and damage other bridges, although the railroad bridge at Sinuiju remains standing. Escorting F9F Panthers shoot down three MiG-15s. Nearly 600 sorties are flown, and no U.S. aircraft are lost.
- November 10 – During a flight to return a Mark 4 nuclear bomb secretly deployed in Canada to the United States, a U.S. Air Force B-50 Superfortress suffers engine trouble and jettisons the bomb over the St. Lawrence River near Rivière-du-Loup, Québec, Canada, at an altitude of 10,500 feet (3,200 meters), set to self-destruct at an altitude of 2,500 feet (760 meters). The explosion shakes residents of the area and scatters nearly 100 pounds (45 kilograms) of uranium-238 over the countryside.
- November 13 – A Curtiss Reid Flying Services C-54B-1-DC Skymaster flying 50 miles (80 km) off course crashes on 6,740-foot (2,050-meter) Tête de l'Obiou mountain south of Grenoble, France, killing all 58 people on board. It is the deadliest aviation accident in French history at the time.
- November 22 – Flying in fog, a New Tribes Mission Douglas DC-3C (registration N74586) crashes into Wyoming's Mount Moran at an altitude of 11,200 feet (3,400 meters), killing all 21 people on board, including eight children. A rescue party discovers the wreckage on November 25, but its location precludes recovery of the aircraft or bodies.
- November 23 – A Faucett Perú Douglas C-47B-25-DK Skytrain (registration OB-PAU-201) crashes at Cuzco, Peru, killing all nine people on board.
- November 25 – The People's Republic of China launches a major offensive across the Yalu River against United Nations forces in Korea. Under terrible winter weather conditions, United Nations aircraft are heavily committed to supporting ground forces, which are driven out of northern Korea by the end of the year.
- November 28 – An Indonesian Air Force Douglas C-47B-25-DK Skytrain (registration T-446) crashes into Mount Galunggung on Java south of Bandung, Indonesia, killing all 15 of the 27 people on board. In 1970, the airport at Banjarmasin in South Kalimantan, Indonesia, will be named Syamsudin Noor Airport in honor of one of the flight's pilots.
- November 30 – After a rushed replenishment in Japan, the U.S. Navy's Task Force 77 returns to action off Korea, its aircraft carriers launching 39 sorties during the day in support of United Nations forces retreating in the face of the Chinese offensive in northern Korea.

=== December ===
- President of the United States Harry S. Truman authorizes the storage of unassembled atomic bomb components aboard a U.S. Navy aircraft carrier in East Asia.
- December 1
  - The United States Air Force removes the Tactical Air Command from the control of the Continental Air Command. The Tactical Air Command returns to the status of a major command for the first time since December 1948.
  - An Iran Air Douglas C-47A-25-DK Skytrain (registration EP-AAJ) crashes into a mountain northwest of Chamaran, Iran, killing all eight people on board.
- December 2–25 – Four hundred aircraft from seven United Nations aircraft carriers support U.N. ground forces with air strikes while U.S. Air Force aircraft drop supplies to them as they break out of their encirclement in northern Korea and are evacuated successfully by sea from Hungnam in the Battle of Chosin Reservoir.
- December 3 – The carrier aircraft of U.S. Navy Task Force 77 are tasked solely with support to United Nations ground forces in northern Korea retreating in the face of the Chinese offensive toward an evacuation at Hungnam, flying reconnaissance missions, attacking Chinese positions, and escorting military transport aircraft flying supplies into Hagaru-ri. Air controllers handle 359 U.N. aircraft on this day, most of them from Task Force 77.
- December 4
  - The Fighter Squadron 32 (VF-32) F4U Corsair of the first African American naval aviator, U.S. Navy Ensign Jesse L. Brown, operating off of the aircraft carrier USS Leyte (CV-32), suddenly loses power while supporting the 1st Marine Division's breakout from the Chosin Reservoir, forcing Brown to make a hard crash-landing, in which he is injured. His wingman, Lieutenant, junior grade, Thomas J. Hudner, crash-lands his own Corsair near Brown's and attempts to help Brown, as does the pilot of a United States Marine Corps Sikorsky HO3S-1 helicopter that arrives later, but Brown dies before they can extricate him from the wreckage. For his actions, Hudner becomes the first member of the U.S. Navy to receive the Medal of Honor during the Korean War.
  - A Pan American World Airways Boeing 307 Strato-Clipper sets a new record time for a commercial flight from Honolulu, Hawaii, to Los Angeles California, making the trip in 7 hours 20 minutes.
- December 5 – Task Force 77 aircraft carriers launch a record 248 sorties in support of U.N. forces retreating toward Hungnam.
- December 6 – Douglas Dakotas of 13 Flight Royal Hellenic Air Force evacuate American casualties from the Chosin Reservoir.
- December 7 – Despite bad winter weather, aircraft of the Task Force 77 aircraft carriers USS Princeton (CV-37), USS Philippine Sea (CV-47), USS Leyte (CV-32), USS Badoeng Strait (CVE-116), and USS Sicily (CVE-118) fly 216 sorties in support of United Nations forces retreating toward Hungnam.
- December 8 – During its initial climb about four minutes after takeoff from Bangui Airport in Bangui, Ubangi-Shari, French Equatorial Africa, a Transports Aériens Intercontinentaux (TAI) Douglas C-54A-DO Skymaster (registration F-BELB) crashes into high ground 16 kilometers (9.9 miles) south of the airport, killing 46 of the 56 people on board. It is the worst aviation accident in the history of what would become the Central African Republic.
- December 9 – In Korea, Royal Australian Air Force 77 Squadron replaces its F-51 Mustangs with Gloster Meteors.
- December 13 – After its crew makes a navigational error, an Air India Douglas C-47B-5-DK Skytrain (registration VT-CFK) crashes into high ground near Rangaswamy Pillar, Kotagiri, India, killing all 21 people on board (including the statistician Abraham Wald).
- December 15 – An Avensa Douglas C-47-DL Skytrain (registration YV-C-AVU) crashes into mountains near Valera, Venezuela, killing all 31 people on board. It is the deadliest aviation accident in Venezuelan history at the time.
- December 17 – The United States Air Force F-86 Sabre fighter begins operations in the Korean War; four F-86s engage four MiG-15s and shoot down one of them.
- December 18 – Two French Air Force Junkers Ju 52s (registration 328/F-RBEH and 384/F-RBDK) are involved in an accident at Tourane, French Indochina, killing all 30 people aboard the two aircraft. At the time, it is the second-deadliest aviation accident in the history of what would later become Vietnam.
- December 19 – During a flight from Naha Air Base on Okinawa to Clark Air Force Base in the Philippines, a U.S. Air Force Douglas C-54E-5-DO Skymaster flying at 8,000 feet (2,438 meters) under instrument flight rules crashes into 9,322-foot (2,841-meter) Mount Tabayoc 93 miles (150 kilometers) north of Clark, killing all 37 people on board. It is the deadliest aviation accident in Philippine history at the time.
- December 30
  - A Royal Australian Air Force CAC Wirraway crashes into a crowded beach at Maroochydore in Queensland, Australia, killing three children and injuring 14 other people on the beach. The two-man crew survives the crash.
  - An Aerolineas Argentinas Douglas C-47A-20-DK Skytrain (registration LV-ACH) with between 15 and 18 people on board crashes during a night flight near Cobo, Argentina. An eight-year-old girl is the only survivor.
- Late December – The U.S. Joint Chiefs of Staff note that if the Korean War expands into an open war with the People's Republic of China, the United States will launch an air offensive against the PRC but would not engage in a major war in East Asia that would jeopardize the defense of Europe against the Soviet Union.

== First flights ==
- Hiller HJ-1, prototype of the Hiller YH-32 Hornet

=== January ===
- January 13 – Mikoyan-Gurevich I-330, prototype of the MiG-17
- January 19 – Avro Canada CF-100 Canuck RCAF 18101
- January 24 – Nord 1601
- January 25 – North American YF-93 by George Welch
- January 28 – Brochet MB.70

=== March ===
- March 26 – XA2D Skyshark

=== April ===
- Chase XCG-20
- April 4 – Jodel D11 F-BBBF
- April 18 – Convair XP5Y-1 BuNo 121455, the first turboprop-powered flying boat to fly, prototype of the R3Y Tradewind
- April 30 – SNCASE Grognard

=== May ===
- May 1 – Indraéro Aéro 101
- May 4 – Northrop YRB-49A, prototype of the reconnaissance version of the Northrop YB-49 bomber.
- May 5 – Scottish Aviation Prestwick Pioneer prototype G-AKBF
- May 10 – de Havilland Heron G-ALZL

=== June ===
- June 3 – Republic YF-96A, prototype of the F-84F Thunderstreak
- June 10 – SNCASE SE-3110
- June 16 – FMA IAe 33 Pulqui II
- June 19 – Hawker P.1081 VX279
- June 20 – Blackburn and General GAL.60 Universal Freighter (Blackburn Beverley)

=== July ===
- July 16 – Boisavia Chablis

=== August ===
- August 4 – Nord 2800
- August 11 – Fairchild XC-120 Packplane

=== September ===
- September 1 – Avro Ashton

=== October ===
- October 9 – Dassault MD.80 ABC
- October 10 – Boulton Paul P.111 VT935
- October 13 – Lockheed L-1049 Super Constellation prototype
- October 21 – Martin 4-0-4

=== December ===
- December 1 – Texas A&M College Ag-1

== Entered service ==
- Avro 701 Athena with the Royal Air Force
- Cessna L-19 Bird Dog with the United States Army and Cessna OE-1 Bird Dog with the United States Marine Corps (both redesignated Cessna O-1 Bird Dog in September 1962)
- Northrop C-125 Raider with the United States Air Force
- Westland WS-51 Dragonfly with the Royal Navy

=== June ===
- June 28 – Martin P4M Mercator with United States Navy Patrol Squadron 21 (VP-21)

=== July ===
- July 29 – Vickers Viscount with British European Airways (BEA)

=== August ===
- August 6 – Handley Page Hermes with BOAC

=== October ===
- Grumman AF Guardian with U.S. Navy Antisubmarine Squadron 25
