= SSSB =

SSSB may refer to:

- Shanghai State Security Bureau
- Ship Shore Ship Buffer
- Small Solar System body
- SSSB, the ICAO code for São Borja Airport
- Sy Syms School of Business, undergraduate school of Yeshiva University
