= Nossa Senhora de Fátima Aerodrome =

Brazilian airport

Nossa Senhora de Fátima Aerodrome Campo Nossa Senhora de Fátima
- IATA: QNS; ICAO: SBCO

Summary
- Airport type: Public
- Operator: Fraport Brasil (2024–present)
- Serves: Porto Alegre
- Time zone: BRT (UTC−03:00)
- Coordinates: 29°56′44″S 051°08′37″W
- Website: portoalegre-airport.com.br/pt/terminal-parkshopping-canoas

Map
- Location in Brazil QNS (Brazil)

Runways
Direction	Length		Surface
Direction	m	ft	Surface
13/31	2,751	9,026	Asphalt

Campo Nossa Senhora de Fátima (IATA: QNS, ICAO: SBCO) is a temporary aerodrome located in Canoas, serving Porto Alegre and the region of Greater Porto Alegre, Brazil. It started operations on May 27, 2024, as a contingency measure after the indefinite closure of Salgado Filho Airport as a result of 2024 Rio Grande do Sul floods that caused critical damage to the latter.

It operates using the facilities (runways, taxiways and apron) of Canoas Air Force Base. A designated area within Park Shopping Canoas Mall is used as a passenger terminal. All passengers are transferred by bus between both locations, which are 4 km away from each other.

It is operated by Fraport Brasil, the same operator of Salgado Filho International Airport.

== Airlines and destinations ==
Airlines	Destinations
Azul Brazilian Airlines	Campinas
Gol Transportes Aéreos	São Paulo–Guarulhos
LATAM Brasil	São Paulo–Congonhas, São Paulo–Guarulhos

== Access ==
The airport is located 6 km (4 mi) from downtown Canoas and 21 km (13 mi) from downtown Porto Alegre.

== See also ==
- List of airports in Brazil
