= Quaraí =

Municipality of Rio Grande do Sul, Brazil

- Municipality
- Flag Coat of arms

- Location in Rio Grande do Sul state

- Location in Brazil
- Coordinates: 30°23′15″S 56°27′5″W
- Country: Brazil
- Region: South
- State: Rio Grande do Sul
- Mesoregion: Sudoeste Rio-Grandense
- Microregion: Campanha Ocidental

Area
  - Total: 3,147.63 km^{2} (1,215.31 sq mi)
- Elevation: 112 m (367 ft)

Population (2020)
  - Total: 22,607
  - Density: 7.1822/km^{2} (18.602/sq mi)
- Time zone: UTC−3 (BRT)
- Postal code: 97560-xxx
- Website: www.quarai.rs.gov.br

Quarai is a Brazilian municipality located on the border with Uruguay on the Rio Quaraí. Its population is 22,607 (2020 est.) in an area of 3,147.63 km^{2}, making it one of the largest municipalities in the state. Its elevation is 112 m. It is located 590 km west of the state capital of Porto Alegre, northeast of Montevideo, Uruguay and southeast of Alegrete.

== Neighbouring municipalities ==
- Uruguaiana, north
- Rosário do Sul, east
- Santana do Livramento, south
- Artigas, Uruguay, south
- Alegrete, northwest

== Flag ==
Created in 1971, the flag is made up of three stripes, blue, green and white in normal tones, it features a blue and red triangle-rectangle and a quadrilateral green that ascends between the two triangles with a blue triangle and in the left side of the flag, the angle of the green triangle is low and right. The center is elliptically vertical, in the white panel, the coat of arms added under law 400 21 December 1964.

== Geography ==
The area includes the Cerro do Jarau, a crater with 5.5 km in diameter dating back to around 117 million years and Salamanda do Jarau.

== Population ==
Year	Population
1996	23,244
1997	23,430
1998	23,618
1999	23,809
2000	24,002
2004	24,987
2020	22,607

== History ==
The first inhabitants were South American Indians including the Jarros, Guenoas, Minuanos and the Charruas people. The city was created on 8 April 1875.

== The creation ==
The diplomatic action of the Treaty of Badajoz was signed in 1801 in which the then territorial boundary of Rio Grande do Sul became bounded at the Rio Quaraí. In 1814, its first ranches were founded.

== Consular representation ==
Uruguay has a Consulate in Quaraí.

== Climate ==
Climate data for Quaraí (1976–2005)
Month	Jan	Feb	Mar	Apr	May	Jun	Jul	Aug	Sep	Oct	Nov	Dec	Year
Record high °C (°F)	37.0 (98.6)	35.7 (96.3)	34.6 (94.3)	31.3 (88.3)	28.3 (82.9)	26.3 (79.3)	27.0 (80.6)	29.0 (84.2)	30.4 (86.7)	33.0 (91.4)	34.6 (94.3)	36.3 (97.3)	37.0 (98.6)
Mean daily maximum °C (°F)	31.5 (88.7)	30.1 (86.2)	28.5 (83.3)	24.6 (76.3)	21.1 (70.0)	18.3 (64.9)	18.2 (64.8)	20.2 (68.4)	21.7 (71.1)	24.7 (76.5)	27.2 (81.0)	30.3 (86.5)	24.7 (76.5)
Daily mean °C (°F)	25.5 (77.9)	24.5 (76.1)	23.0 (73.4)	19.2 (66.6)	15.9 (60.6)	13.6 (56.5)	13.5 (56.3)	14.9 (58.8)	16.3 (61.3)	19.1 (66.4)	21.3 (70.3)	24.1 (75.4)	19.2 (66.6)
Mean daily minimum °C (°F)	19.5 (67.1)	19.0 (66.2)	17.6 (63.7)	13.9 (57.0)	10.8 (51.4)	8.8 (47.8)	8.8 (47.8)	9.6 (49.3)	10.8 (51.4)	13.6 (56.5)	15.4 (59.7)	17.9 (64.2)	13.8 (56.8)
Record low °C (°F)	12.9 (55.2)	12.2 (54.0)	10.1 (50.2)	5.4 (41.7)	1.9 (35.4)	−0.9 (30.4)	−1.1 (30.0)	0.6 (33.1)	1.8 (35.2)	5.2 (41.4)	8.2 (46.8)	10.9 (51.6)	−1.1 (30.0)
Average precipitation mm (inches)	132.5 (5.22)	123.1 (4.85)	133.6 (5.26)	105.9 (4.17)	107.5 (4.23)	93.8 (3.69)	92.5 (3.64)	83.5 (3.29)	117.6 (4.63)	140.5 (5.53)	93.6 (3.69)	115.2 (4.54)	1,339.3 (52.74)
Average relative humidity (%)	66	70	75	77	81	80	80	76	71	70	67	64	73
Mean monthly sunshine hours	278	232	232	201	178	139	159	178	194	234	261	273	2,559
Source: Empresa Brasileira de Pesquisa Agropecuária (EMBRAPA)

== See also ==
- Brazilian Island
- List of municipalities in Rio Grande do Sul
