= Manoel Viana =

Municipality of Rio Grande do Sul, Brazil

- Municipality
- Municipality of Manoel Viana
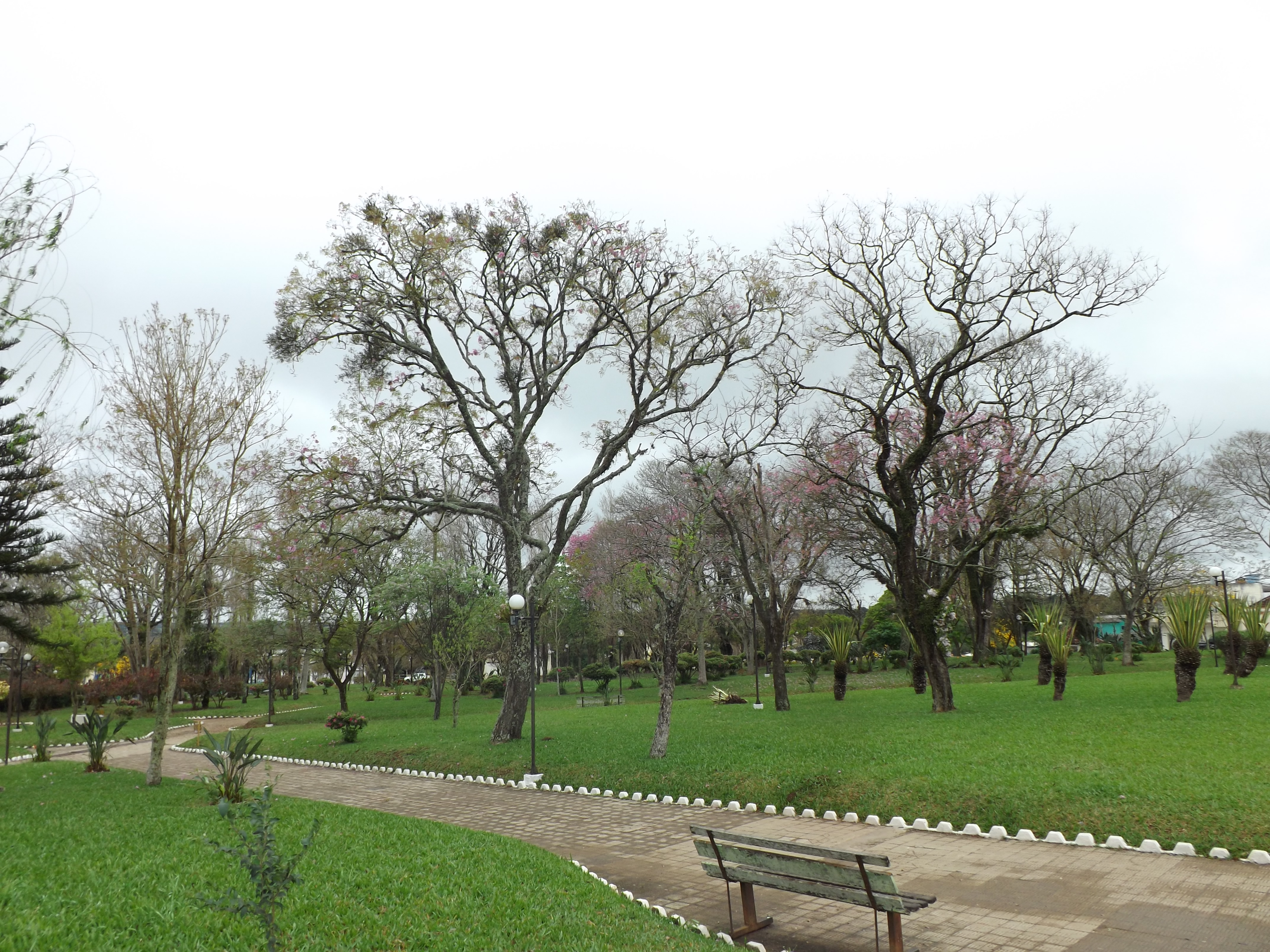

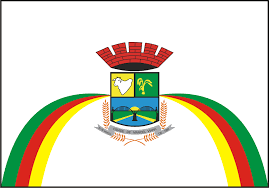
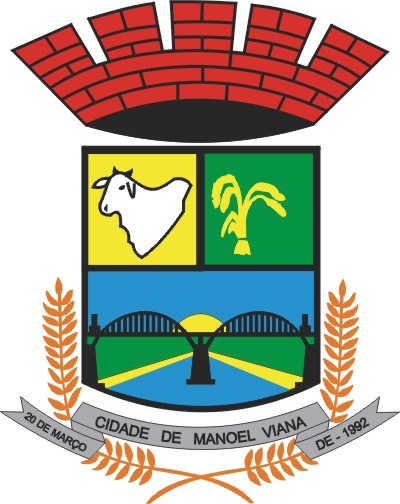
- Flag Coat of arms

- Location within Rio Grande do Sul

- Location in Brazil
- Coordinates: 29°35′21″S 55°28′58″W
- Country: Brazil
- State: Rio Grande do Sul
- Mesoregion: Southwestern Rio Grande do Sul (Sudoeste Rio-Grandense)
- Microregion: Campanha Ocidental
- Founded: March 20, 1992

Area
  - Total: 1,390.7 km^{2} (537.0 sq mi)
- Elevation: 113 m (371 ft)

Population (2020)
  - Total: 7,307
  - Density: 5.254/km^{2} (13.61/sq mi)
- Demonym: Vianense
- Time zone: UTC−3 (BRT)
- Postal code: 97640-000
- HDI (2010): 0.655 – medium
- Website: www.manoelviana.rs.gov.br

Manoel Viana is a Brazilian municipality in the western part of the state of Rio Grande do Sul. It has a population of 7,307 (2020). Its elevation is 113 m. It has an area of 1,390.7 square kilometers making it one of the largest municipalities in the state. It is located 590 km west of the state capital of Porto Alegre and east of Alegrete. It is the only municipality that is by the Ibicuí River.

== Neighboring municipalities ==
- Itaqui
- Maçambará
- São Francisco de Assis
- Alegrete

== See also ==
- List of municipalities in Rio Grande do Sul
