= Rosário do Sul =

Municipality of Rio Grande do Sul, Brazil

- Municipality
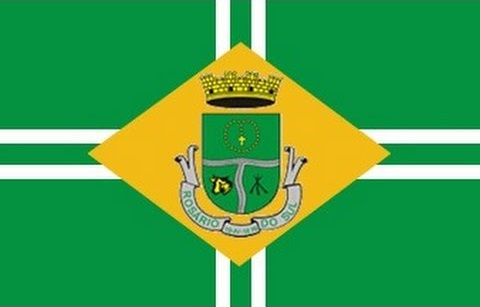
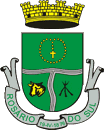
- Flag Coat of arms

- Location in Rio Grande do Sul state

- Location in Brazil
- Coordinates: 30°15′S 54°55′W
- Country: Brazil
- Region: South
- State: Rio Grande do Sul
- Mesoregion: Sudoeste Rio-Grandense
- Microregion: Campanha Central

Area
  - Total: 4,369.65 km^{2} (1,687.13 sq mi)

Population (2020)
  - Total: 39,314
  - Density: 8.9971/km^{2} (23.302/sq mi)
- Time zone: UTC−3 (BRT)
- Postal code: 97590-000
- Website: www.rosariodosul.rs.gov.br

Rosário do Sul is a Brazilian municipality in the southwestern part of the state of Rio Grande do Sul. The population is 39,314 (2020 est.) in an area of 4,369.65 km^{2}. Its elevation is 151 m. It is located 385 km west of the state capital of Porto Alegre. Its main industry is agriculture. Many Argentine and Uruguayan tourists visits during the spring, with a large infrastructure to accommodate the visitors.

== Bounding municipalities ==
- São Gabriel
- Santana do Livramento
- Dom Pedrito

== The origin of the name of the city ==
The first inhabitants came from the Mainland of Rio Grande de São Pedro and settled the area. It was founded in 1813 and received the name "Rosário". In 1939, it became a city. In the 1940s, there was a movement in changing the city name in order to avoid confusions with Rosario in Argentina located west of the city. A part of the population favour the name Minuano, others prefer a traditional name lengthened with "do Sul" for the geographical location of the city in Brazil. It was renamed to Rosário do Sul in 1944.

== History ==
- April 27, 1809 - The area became a parish of Freguesia de Nossa Senhora do Rosário do Rio Pardo
- February 20, 1827 - The Battle of Passo do Rosário
- February 19, 1843 - In the Passo do Rosário, with the forces of general David Canabarro and Antônio de Souza Neto.
- September 5, 1865 - Dom Pedro II visited the parish
- April 19, 1876 - It was elevated to a town (political and administrative autonomy under Law 1020)
- April 25, 1877 - Installed the first chamber of winners
- December 20, 1912 - Inauguration of the João Pessoa Municipal Theatre
- October 12, 1925 - Foundation of Hospital de Caridade Nossa Senhora Auxiliadora
- May 8, 1976 - Foundation of the Werneldo Horbe Public Library
- July 3, 1969 - The Ponte Mal. José de Abreu opened
- 1970 - Law 731 - The creation of the municipal flag
- September 30, 1973 - Foundation of the Honório Lemes Municipal Museum
- 1975 - Municipal Decree 58 - Creation of the official municipal anthem
- April 19, 1976 - The centennial celebration of Rosário do Sul

== Geography ==
Rosário do Sul is situated on the Santa Maria River. The Areias Brancas is a popular river beach on the river. The river is crossed by the 1,772 m long Marechal José de Abreu bridge, the third largest in the state. Wheat is the dominant field crop.

Districts:

1st – Seat: 889 km^{2}
2nd – Mangueira: 490 km^{2}
3rd – Caverá: 646 km^{2}
4th – São Carlos: 620 km^{2}
5th – Campo Seco: 1297 km^{2}
6th – Touro Passo: 524 km^{2}

- Literacy rate (2000): 9.93%
- Life expectancy (2000): 70.49 years
- GNP (2003): R$ mil 299,733
- GDP per capita (2003): R$7* Total Exports (2005): U$ FOB 172,583

=== Climate ===
Subtropical

- Maximum temperature: higher than 32 °C (generally in January)
- Minimum temperature: between 3 °C and 18 °C (generally in July)
- Medium annual precipitation: 1600 mm
- Winds: predominantly South Atlantic (east–west)

Rosário do Sul has one of the coolest climates in Brazil.

== Education and culture ==
Rosário do Sul has many schools, the main ones are Escola de Ensino Médio Fronteira, Escola Padre Ângelo Bartelle and Escola de Ensino Médio Plácido de Castro.

The Desfile Tradicional is a very large horse parade that celebrates the Declaration of Independence in 1835 that started the Ragamuffin War on September 20 each year. Hundreds of Gauchos in traditional gaúcho attire parade on horseback past the central square of the city.

== See also ==
- List of municipalities in Rio Grande do Sul
