= Sociedade Anônima Viação Aérea Gaúcha =

Brazilian airline

SAVAG – Sociedade Anônima Viação Aérea Gaúcha
- Founded: 1946
- Commenced operations: 1947
- Ceased operations: 1966
- Headquarters: Rio Grande, Brazil
- Key people: Gustavo Kraemer; Augusto Otero

SAVAG – Sociedade Anônima Viação Aérea Gaúcha was a Brazilian airline founded in 1946 that operated mainly in the state of Rio Grande do Sul. It was absorbed by Cruzeiro do Sul in 1966.

== History ==
SAVAG was founded in on November 25, 1946 in the city of Rio Grande, in the state of Rio Grande do Sul, by Augusto Otero and Gustavo Kraemer, with a concession to fly within the state of Rio Grande do Sul. Later, the concession was expanded to include the state of Santa Catarina.

In 1947 SAVAG purchased 3 Lockheed Model 18 Lodestar from Panair do Brasil and initiated services between Porto Alegre, Rio Grande, Pelotas, and Bagé. In 1948 SAVAG started flying to the north of the state was well.

SAVAG faced fierce competition from Varig and, for this reason, it had strong support from Varig's competitor in the region, Cruzeiro do Sul. It was from Cruzeiro do Sul that SAVAG purchased 2 Douglas DC-3 and it was with Cruzeiro that SAVAG established an operational partnership.

Varig, a politically more powerful player, pressured the Air Force Ministry to gradually cancel route concessions of SAVAG, alleging excessive competition. On January 1, 1966, SAVAG was bought and merged into Cruzeiro do Sul.

In 1953 Bagé International Airport was named in honor of Gustavo Kraemer, founder of SAVAG. Moreover, Salgado Filho International Airport in Porto Alegre was named in honor of the senator and minister Joaquim Pedro Salgado Filho, who was killed in the 1950 accident with a SAVAG aircraft.

== Destinations ==
In 1960 SAVAG operated in the following locations in the states of Paraná, Santa Catarina, and Rio Grande do Sul

- Alegrete
- Bagé – Comte. Gustavo Kraemer Airport
- Carazinho
- Cascavel – Cascavel Airport
- Erechim – Erechim Airport
- Joaçaba – Joaçaba Airport
- Passo Fundo – Lauro Kurtz Airport
- Pelotas – Pelotas International Airport
- Porto Alegre – Salgado Filho International Airport
- Rio Grande – Rio Grande Airport
- Santana do Livramento
- Toledo – Toledo Airport
- Uruguaiana – Ruben Berta International Airport

== Fleet ==
SAVAG fleet
Aircraft	Total	Years of operation	Notes
Lockheed Model 18 Lodestar	3	1947–1951	
Douglas DC-3	2	1949–1966	

== Accidents and incidents ==
- 11 January 1949: a Lockheed Model 18-10-01 Lodestar registration PP-SAC flying from Pelotas International Airport to Porto Alegre crashed just after take-off from Pelotas killing all 8 occupants. Causes are likely to have been fuel contamination.
- 30 July 1950: a Lockheed Model 18 Lodestar registration PP-SAA, flying from Porto Alegre to São Borja in bad weather collided against a hill, caught fire and crashed near the location of São Francisco de Assis. All 10 occupants died, including the founder of SAVAG and pilot, Gustavo Kraemer, and Joaquim Pedro Salgado Filho, senator and first Minister of Air Force in Brazil.

== See also ==
- List of defunct airlines of Brazil
