= São Borja Airport =

São Borja Airport Aeroporto de São Borja
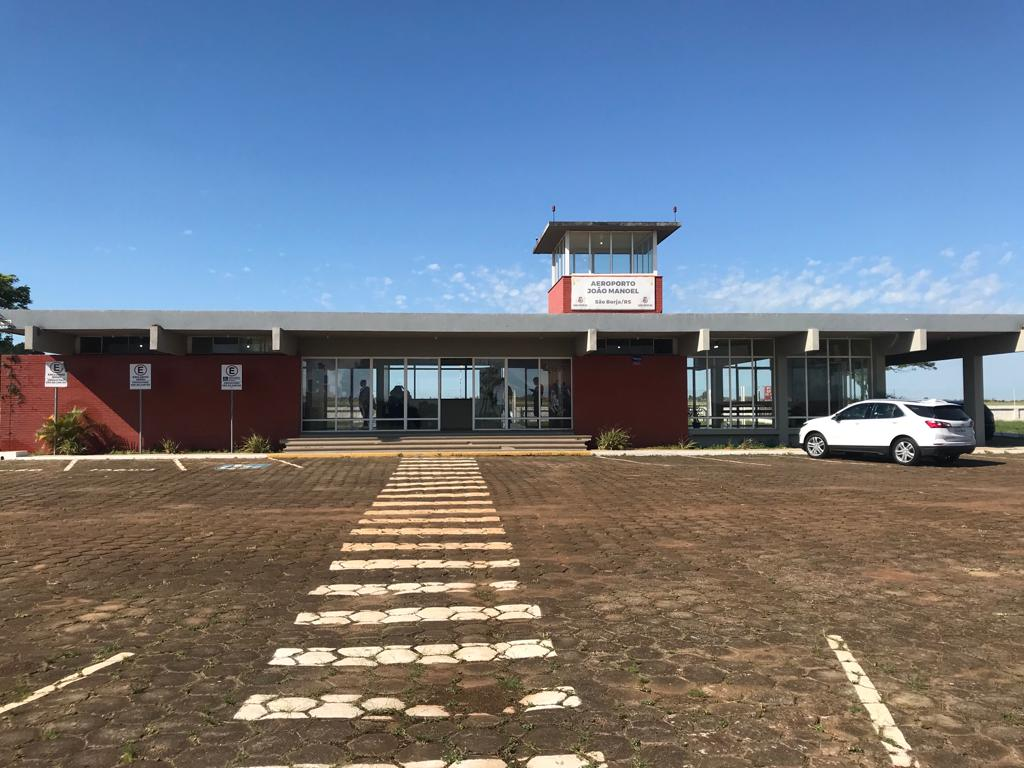
- IATA: JBS; ICAO: SSSB; LID: RS0014

Summary
- Airport type: Public
- Serves: São Borja
- Time zone: BRT (UTC−03:00)
- Elevation AMSL: 80 m (260 ft)
- Coordinates: 28°39′17″S 056°02′05″W

Map
- Location in Brazil JBS (Brazil)

Runways
Direction	Length		Surface
Direction	m	ft	Surface
07/25	1,500	4,921	Asphalt
14/32	700	2,297	Grass
- Sources: ANAC, DECEA

São Borja Airport (IATA: JBS, ICAO: SSSB), also known as João Manoel Airport, is the airport serving São Borja, located in the Rio Grande do Sul state of Brazil.

== Accidents and incidents ==
- 30 June 1950: a SAVAG Lockheed Model 18 Lodestar registration PP-SAA flying from Porto Alegre to São Borja in bad weather collided against a hill, caught fire and crashed near the location of São Francisco de Assis. All 10 occupants died, including the founder of SAVAG and pilot, Gustavo Kraemer, and Joaquim Pedro Salgado Filho, senator and first Minister of Air Force in Brazil.

== Access ==
The airport is located 4 km (2 mi) from downtown São Borja.

== See also ==
- List of airports in Brazil
