= Pelotas International Airport =

Airport serving Pelotas, Brazil

Pelotas–João Simões Lopes Neto International Airport Aeroporto Internacional de Pelotas–João Simões Lopes Neto

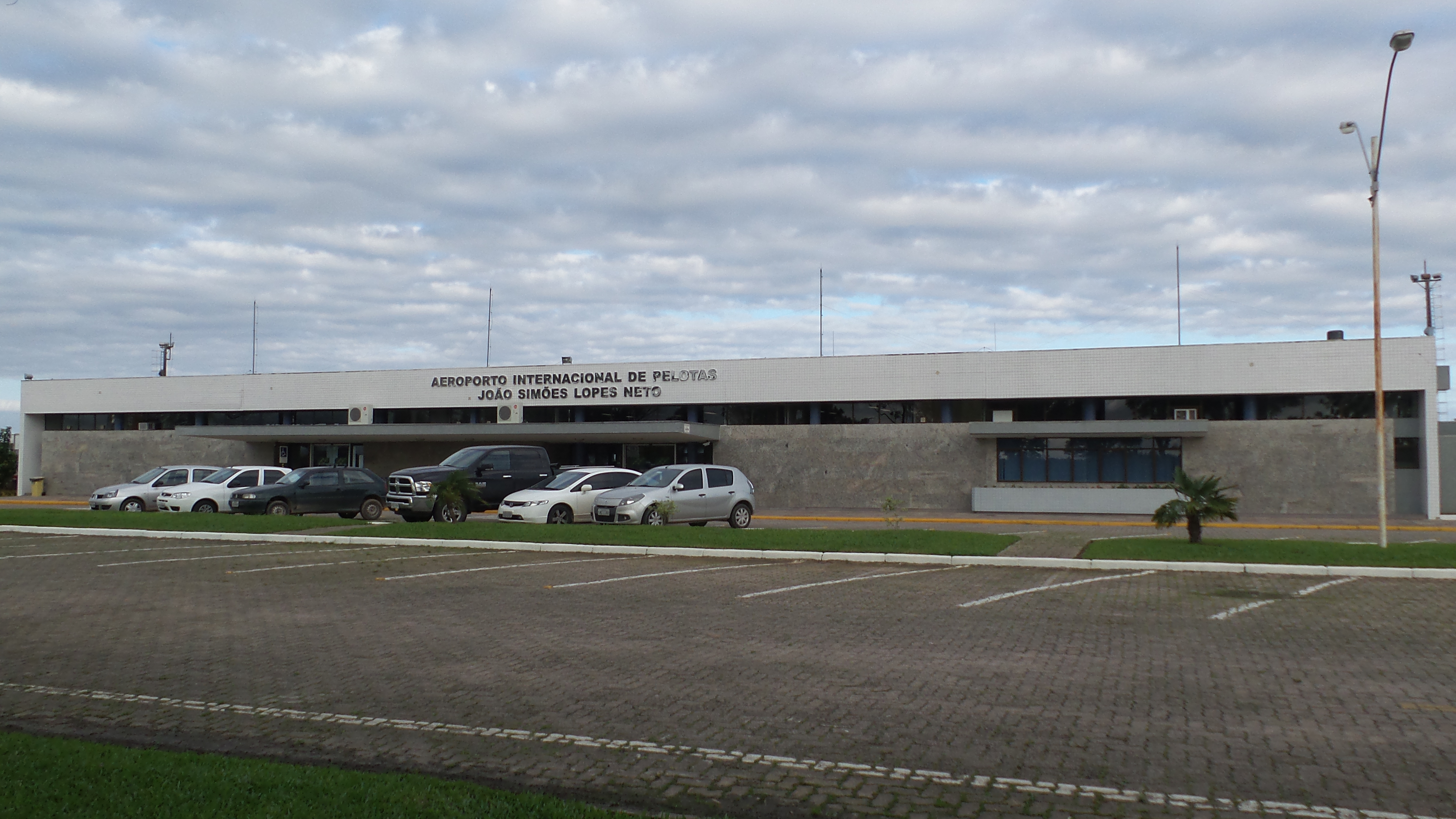
- IATA: PET; ICAO: SBPK; LID: RS0005

Summary
- Airport type: Public
- Operator: Infraero (1980–2021); Motiva (2021–2026); ASUR (2026–present)
- Serves: Pelotas
- Time zone: BRT (UTC−03:00)
- Elevation AMSL: 18 m (59 ft)
- Coordinates: 31°42′58″S 052°19′52″W
- Website: aeroportos.motiva.com.br/pelotas-rs/

Map
- Location in Brazil PET (Brazil)

Runways
| Direction | Length | | Surface |
| Direction | m | ft | Surface |
|---|---|---|---|
| 07/25 | 1,823 | 5,981 | Concrete |

Statistics (2025)
- Passengers: 93,322 ▼5%
- Aircraft Operations: 1,938 ▼28%
- Statistics: Motiva; Sources: Airport Website, ANAC, DECEA

Pelotas–João Simões Lopes Neto International Airport (IATA: PET, ICAO: SBPK) is the airport serving Pelotas, Brazil.

This airport was named after the regional writer João Simões Lopes Neto (1865 — 1916).

It is operated by ASUR.

== History ==
On June 22, 1927 the city of Pelotas received the first official commercial passenger flight operated by the first Brazilian airline, Varig, founded only a month earlier. The flight Porto Alegre/Pelotas/Rio Grande, operated by an amphibian Dornier Wal, used Pelotas River for landing and take-off operations. However, as early as 1930 a small terminal was built by a grass strip on the site where today is the airport.

In 1935 the airport with all the necessary amenities was officially inaugurated and continues in operation ever since.

In 1997 the whole airport complex was extensively renovated and a new terminal was opened in 1998. In 2001 it was upgraded to international status.

Pelotas is commonly used by the Brazilian Air Force as the last stop in Brazil on its flights to the Brazilian Antarctic Base.

Previously operated by Infraero, on April 7, 2021 CCR won a 30-year concession to operate the airport. On April 26, 2025 CCR was rebranded as Motiva.

On November 18, 2025 the entire airports portfolio of Motiva was sold to the Mexican airport operator ASUR. Motiva will cease to operate airports. The transaction was completed on August 31, 2026.

== Airlines and destinations ==
| Airlines | Destinations |
|---|---|
| Azul Brazilian Airlines | Campinas, Porto Alegre |
| Gol Linhas Aéreas | São Paulo–Congonhas |
| LATAM Brasil | São Paulo–Guarulhos |

== Accidents and incidents ==
- 11 January 1949: a SAVAG Lockheed Model 18-10-01 Lodestar registration PP-SAC flying from Pelotas to Porto Alegre crashed just after take-off from Pelotas killing all 8 occupants. Causes are likely to have been fuel contamination.
- 12 April 1960: a Varig Douglas C-53 registration PP-CDS operating a flight for Cruzeiro do Sul from Pelotas to Porto Alegre collided with two other aircraft, crashed and caught fire after it deviated to the right on take-off and an over correction caused a sharp turn to the left. Of the 22 passengers and crew aboard, 10 died.

== Access ==
The airport is located 8 km (5 mi) from downtown Pelotas.

== See also ==
- List of airports in Brazil
