= Microregion of Campanha Ocidental =

Coordinates: 29°47′02″S 55°47′28″W

Campanha Ocidental
- Micro-region
- Country: Brazil
- State: Rio Grande do Sul
- Mesoregion: Sudoeste Rio-Grandense
- Municipalities: 10

Area
  - Total: 31,125 km^{2} (12,017 sq mi)

The Campanha Ocidental micro-region (Microrregião de Campanha Ocidental, meaning the western fields in Portuguese) is a microregion in the western part of the state of Rio Grande do Sul, Brazil. The area is 31,125.429 km^{2} making it the largest micro-region in the state nearly covering one-tenth of the entire state, much of the central and eastern portions remain underpopulated.

== Municipalities ==
The microregion consists of the following municipalities:

- Alegrete
- Barra do Quaraí
- Garruchos
- Itaqui
- Maçambara
- Manoel Viana
- Quaraí
- São Borja
- São Francisco de Assis
- Uruguaiana
