= Salgado Filho Porto Alegre International Airport =

Brazilian airport

Porto Alegre–Salgado Filho International Airport Aeroporto Internacional de Porto Alegre–Salgado Filho

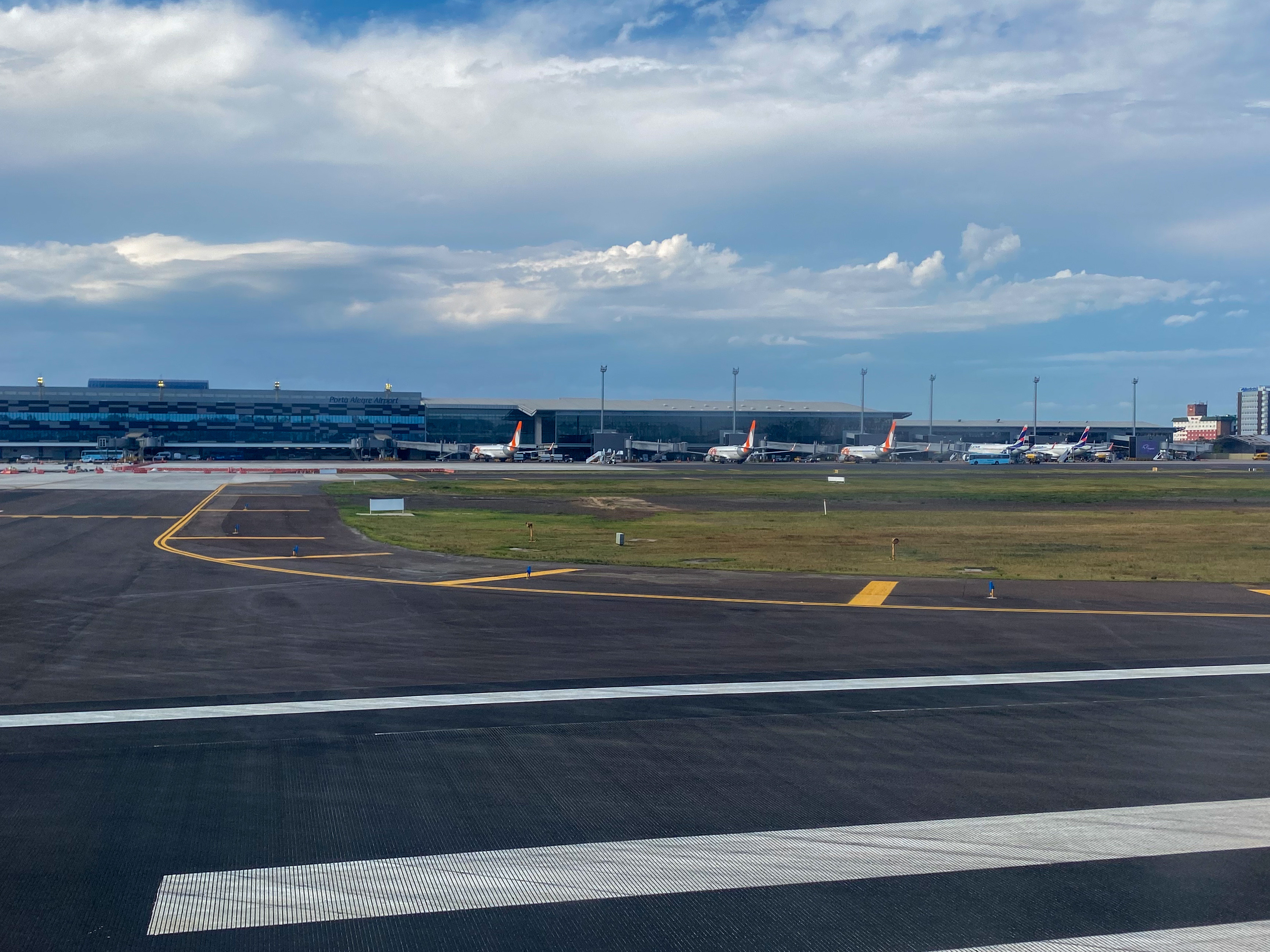
- IATA: POA; ICAO: SBPA; LID: RS0001; WMO: 83971

Summary
- Airport type: Public
- Operator: Infraero (1974–2017); Fraport Brasil (2017–present)
- Serves: Porto Alegre
- Focus city for: Azul Brazilian Airlines
- Time zone: BRT (UTC−03:00)
- Elevation AMSL: 9 m (30 ft)
- Coordinates: 29°59′41″S 051°10′16″W
- Website: portoalegre-airport.com.br/en/

Map
- Location in Brazil POA (Brazil)

Runways
Direction	Length		Surface
Direction	m	ft	Surface
11/29	3,200	10,499	Asphalt

Statistics (2025)
- Passengers: 7,513,020 ▲94%
- Aircraft Operations: 67,313 ▲92%
- Metric tonnes of cargo: 33,792 ▲193%
- Statistics: Fraport; Sources: Airport Website, ANAC, DECEA

Porto Alegre–Salgado Filho International Airport (IATA: POA, ICAO: SBPA) is the airport serving Porto Alegre and the region of Greater Porto Alegre, Brazil. Since October 12, 1951, it is named after the Senator and first Minister of the Brazilian Air Force Joaquim Pedro Salgado Filho (1888–1950).

It is operated by Fraport Brasil.

== History ==
Salgado Filho was originally called São João Federal Airport, after the neighborhood where it is located. In the beginning it was an air club, where the first flights landed on May 31, 1923.

In 1932, needing a facility for the fixed-gear aircraft which were replacing its seaplanes, Varig started using São João Airport as an operational base. However, it was only in 1940 that the first passenger terminal was commissioned.

On October 12, 1951, São João Federal Airport was renamed Salgado Filho Airport, after the Senator and Minister who died the year before in a crash involving a SAVAG aircraft that departed from Porto Alegre. On July 21, 1953, within a law prescribing rules for the naming of airports, the name of the facility was officially and exceptionally maintained as Salgado Filho Airport.

In 1953, the old terminal was incorporated into the maintenance facilities of Varig, a new passenger terminal was opened, and runways were paved. Until that year, larger aircraft such as Lockheed L-049 Constellations had to land at Canoas Air Force Base. This new terminal is known today as Passenger Terminal 2. It underwent major renovations and enlargements between 1969 and 1971; but unable to cope with the increasing traffic, another brand new facility was built. This new facility was named Passenger Terminal 1 and opened on September 11, 2001. Terminal 2 became underused by general aviation and cargo services.

However, in order to cope with the increasing passenger traffic at the airport, on September 8, 2010, a decision was made to renovate Terminal 2 and bring it back into passenger use. It became operational on December 4, 2010. This terminal 2 was again closed for air traffic on September 15, 2019, and it became the administration center of Fraport Brasil S.A.- Aeroporto de Porto Alegre.

Responding to critiques to the situation of its airports, on May 18, 2011, Infraero released a list evaluating some of its most important airports according to its saturation levels. According to the list, Porto Alegre was considered to be in good situation, operating with less than 70% of its capacity.

Previously operated by Infraero, in January 2018, the airport's operations and administration were taken over by the German private airport operator Fraport, which in the previous year had been the winning bidder in an B3 (stock exchange) auction conducted by the Brazilian government for the concession of the airport for 25 years. Since the airport concession, Fraport has been expanding the runway from the current 2,280 meters (7,481 ft) to 3,200 meters (10,499 ft), allowing the landing of large aircraft and allowing the landing of flights from North America and Europe. It is expected that the expansion works will be concluded at the end of 2021.

The total area of the Salgado Filho Airport is about 3,805,810 square metres (40,965,400 sq ft) (940 acres) with 14,750 square metres (158,800 sq ft) of ramp area. Terminal 1 has 37,600 square metres (405,000 sq ft) and 16 gates with jetways. Terminal 2 has 15,540 square metres (167,300 sq ft). In front of Terminal 1 there is a carpark with 1,440 places. Terminal 1 is the first facility in Latin America with a shopping mall.

One of the two TAP Maintenance & Engineering centers in Brazil is located at Salgado Filho International Airport.

As of May 2022, the airport's expanded 3,200 m (10,499 ft) runway has come into operation. With the runway expansion, larger aircraft such as the Boeing 747-400, Boeing 777-300 and Airbus 330-900 can operate at the airport, allowing direct flights to Europe and the United States.

=== Closure due to flooding ===
On May 3, 2024 due to catastrophic flooding affecting the State of Rio Grande do Sul and in particular to the flooding of the airport, all operations were suspended indefinitely. For this reason, 47 aircraft were stuck at airport after the apron and runways were flooded. As the water level normalized, the aircraft were gradually flown away.

Operations to selected destinations resumed exceptionally at Canoas Air Force Base in the city of Canoas using a makeshift check-in facility at ParkShopping Canoas shopping mall. On July 15, 2024, all departure and arrival procedures restarted taking place at the Salgado Filho airport terminal, but with the passengers driven by bus directly to and from the Air Force Base apron. On this same day, the makeshift check-in facility was closed.

The full airport resumption of services was done in two phases: the first using a runway length of 1,730 m (5,676 ft) least affected by the flooding and restricted to 128 flights a day between 08:00 and 22:00. This first phase happened on October 21, 2024. The second phase, with full resumption of operations took place on December 16, 2024.

== Airlines and destinations ==
=== Passenger ===
Airlines	Destinations
Aerolíneas Argentinas	Buenos Aires–Aeroparque; Seasonal: Punta del Este
Azul Brazilian Airlines	Belo Horizonte–Confins, Campinas, Curitiba, Montevideo (resumes 14 December 2026), Pelotas, Recife, Rio de Janeiro–Galeão, Santa Maria, Santo Ângelo, São Paulo–Congonhas, São Paulo–Guarulhos, Uruguaiana; Seasonal: Foz do Iguaçu, Goiânia, Punta del Este, San Carlos de Bariloche
Copa Airlines	Panama City–Tocumen
Gol Linhas Aéreas	Brasília, Buenos Aires–Aeroparque, Florianópolis, Foz do Iguaçu, Rio de Janeiro–Galeão, Salvador da Bahia (ends 31 January 2027), São Paulo–Congonhas, São Paulo–Guarulhos; Seasonal: Punta del Este (begins 21 December 2026)
LATAM Brasil	Belo Horizonte–Confins, Brasília, Buenos Aires–Aeroparque, Campinas (begins 22 February 2027), Curitiba, Florianópolis, Rio de Janeiro–Galeão, São Paulo–Congonhas, São Paulo–Guarulhos; Seasonal: Salvador da Bahia
LATAM Chile	Santiago de Chile
LATAM Perú	Lima
TAP Air Portugal	Lisbon

== Statistics ==
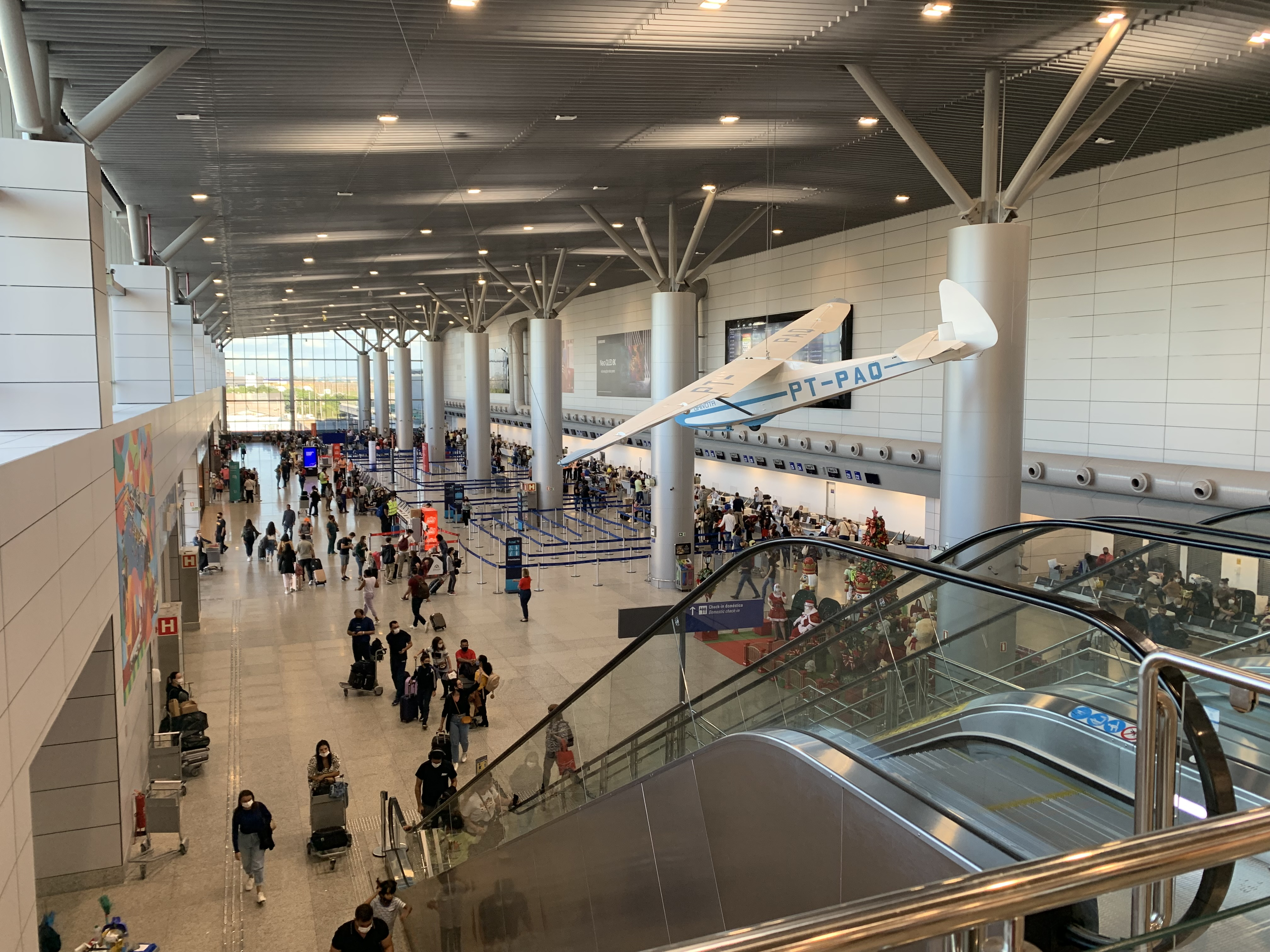
Check-in area

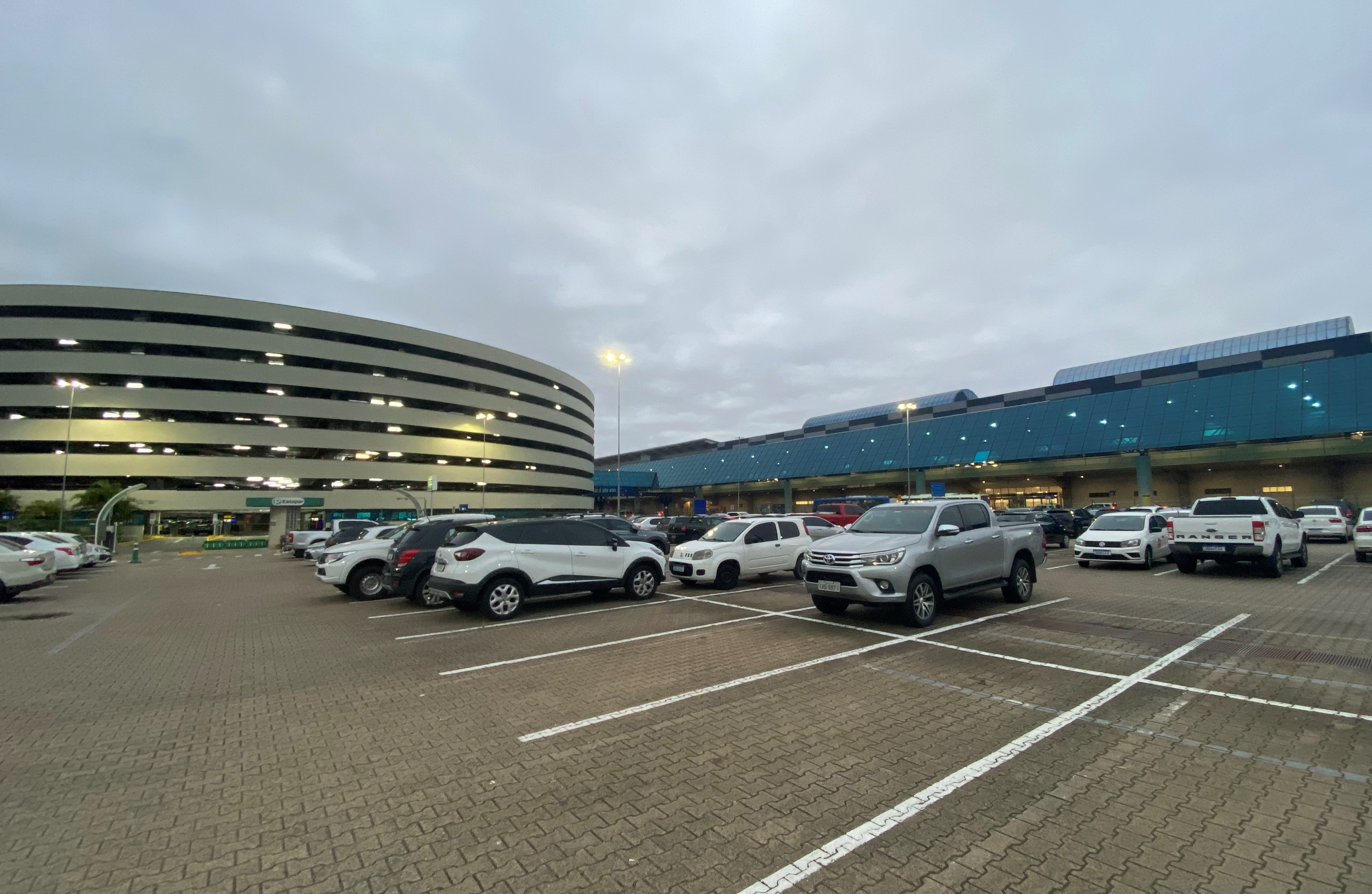
Terminal 1 Parking

Following are the number of passenger, aircraft and cargo movements at the airport, according to Infraero (2007-2017) and Fraport Brazil (2018-2025) reports:

Year	Passenger	Aircraft	Cargo (t)
2025	7,513,020 ▲94%	67,313 ▲92%	33,792 ▲193%
2024^{a}	3,867,012 ▼48%	34,992 ▼52%	11,532 ▼70%
2023	7,480,641 ▲13%	72,639 ▲9%	38,840 ▲45%
2022	6,600,103 ▲37%	66,402 ▲35%	26,709 ▲5%
2021	4,803,176 ▲38%	49,278 ▲30%	25,447 ▲30%
2020	3,476,011 ▼58%	37,913 ▼51%	19,645 ▼36%
2019	8,314,013	77,709 ▼4%	30,501 ▼18%
2018	8,292,608 ▲4%	80,990 ▲2%	36,973 ▲94%
2017	8,012,114 ▲5%	79,473	19,051 ▲5%
2016	7,648,743 ▼8%	79,738 ▼10%	18,159 ▼13%
2015	8,354,961 ▼1%	88,279 ▼5%	20,886 ▼1%
2014	8,447,380 ▲6%	92,960 ▼2%	21,152 ▲1%
2013	7,993,164 ▼3%	94,409 ▼2%	20,886 ▼7%
2012	8,261,355 ▲5%	96,693 ▼3%	22,394 ▼31%
2011	7,834,312 ▲17%	99,583 ▲10%	32,316 ▲20%
2010	6,676,216 ▲19%	90,625 ▲15%	26,970 ▼11%
2009	5,607,703 ▲14%	79,104 ▲9%	30,420 ▼4%
2008	4,931,464 ▲11%	72,445 ▲5%	31,601 ▼18%
2007	4,444,748	68,827	38,469

Note:
^{a}: Between 27 May and 20 October 2024 flights were operated at Canoas Air Force Base with restrictions. There were no flights between 4 and 26 May 2024.

== Accidents and incidents ==
- February 28, 1942: a Varig Junkers Ju 52/3m registration PP-VAL crashed shortly after take-off from Porto Alegre. Seven of the 23 occupants died, including 2 crew members.
- June 20, 1944: a Varig Lockheed 10 A/E Electra registration PP-VAQ on approach to Porto Alegre after a flight from Pelotas during a storm crashed on the waters of Guaíba river. All 10 passengers and crew died.
- August 2, 1949: a Varig Curtiss C-46AD-10-CU Commando registration PP-VBI operating a flight from São Paulo-Congonhas Airport to Porto Alegre made an emergency landing on rough terrain near the location of Jaquirana, approximately 20 minutes before landing in Porto Alegre, following fire on the cargo hold. Of the 36 passenger and crew aboard, 5 died.
- June 30, 1950: a SAVAG Lockheed Model 18 Lodestar registration PP-SAA, flying from Porto Alegre to São Borja in bad weather collided against a hill, caught fire and crashed near the location of São Francisco de Assis. All 10 occupants died, including the founder of SAVAG and pilot, Gustavo Kraemer, and Joaquim Pedro Salgado Filho, senator and first Minister of Air Force in Brazil.
- October 14, 1952: an Aerovias Brasil Douglas C-47-DL registration PP-AXJ operated by Real Transportes Aéreos en route from São Paulo-Congonhas to Porto Alegre struck high ground while flying under adverse conditions over the location of São Francisco de Paula. Of the 18 passengers and crew aboard, 14 died.
- October 18, 1957: a Varig Douglas C-47A-80-DL registration PP-VCS operating a cargo flight from Porto Alegre crashed upon take-off. The crew of two died.
- May 30, 1972: a Varig Lockheed L-188 Electra registration PP-VJL operating a flight between São Paulo-Congonhas to Porto Alegre was hijacked. The hijacker demanded money. The aircraft was stormed and the hijacker shot.

== Access ==
The airport is located 9 km (6 mi) from downtown Porto Alegre.

Since August 10, 2013, the Metro-Airport Connection people mover connects the International Airport to the Porto Alegre Metro Airport Station. From this metro station one can reach most cities of the metropolitan area of Porto Alegre. Bus routes T5, T11, and B09 link Terminal 1 - International Airport to the city of Porto Alegre.

== See also ==
- List of airports in Brazil
