= Microregion of Campanha Central =

Coordinates: 30°53′27″S 55°31′58″W

Campanha Central
- Micro-region
- Country: Brazil
- State: Rio Grande do Sul
- Mesoregion: Sudoeste Rio-Grandense
- Municipalities: 4

Area
  - Total: 17,296 km^{2} (6,678 sq mi)

The Campanha Central micro-region (Microrregião de Campanha Central, meaning the central fields in Portuguese) is a microregion in the western part of the state of Rio Grande do Sul, Brazil.

== Municipalities ==
The microregion consists of the following municipalities:

- Rosário do Sul
- Santa Margarida do Sul
- Santana do Livramento
- São Gabriel
