= Ship Shore Ship Buffer =

The Ship-Shore-Ship Buffer (SSSB) is a real-time data link buffer system supporting data exchange between naval forces, including airborne assets, and their associated air defence ground environment units.
