= Joaquim Pedro Salgado Filho =

Brazilian politician

Salgado Filho

Senator for Rio Grande do Sul
- In office 15 March 1947 – 30 July 1950

Justice of the Superior Military Court
- In office 16 March 1938 – 18 January 1941
- Appointed by: Getúlio Vargas
- Preceded by: Augusto Tasso Fragoso
- Succeeded by: Washington Vaz de Mello

Minister of Labour, Industry and Trade
- In office 4 April 1932 – 25 July 1934
- President: Getúlio Vargas
- Preceded by: Lindolfo Collor
- Succeeded by: Agamenon Magalhães

Personal details
- Born: Joaquim Pedro Salgado Filho; 2 July 1888 Porto Alegre, Rio Grande do Sul, Brazil
- Died: 30 July 1950 (aged 62) São Francisco de Assis, Rio Grande do Sul, Brazil
- Party: PSD (1945–1950)
- Occupation: Lawyer, politician

Joaquim Pedro Salgado Filho (2 July 1888 - 30 July 1950) was a Brazilian lawyer, political leader and influential figure in the separation of the Brazilian Air Force from the Army.

Joaquim Pedro Salgado Filho was born the son of Joaquim Pedro Salgado and Maria Josefa Artayeta Palmeiro on 2 July 1888 in Porto Alegre, Rio Grande do Sul. He supported Getulio Vargas in the Revolution of 1930, working in the Federal District police (1930-1932), then Minister of Labour (1932-1934), congressman (1935-1937), Minister of Aeronautics (1941-1945) and Senator (1947-1950). He was also president of the Brazilian Labor Party from 1948 until his death.

He was one of the creators of the National Air Mail and Air Force School, which resulted in the separation of the Brazilian Air Force of the Army. He stimulated the creation of airports for commercial aviation in Brazil.

Salgado Filho died on 30 July 1950. The Lockheed Lodestar plane, operated by SAVAG, that he was travelling on, crashed near São Francisco de Assis, in Rio Grande do Sul, killing all 10 people on board.

The Salgado Filho Porto Alegre International Airport in Porto Alegre is named after him.
