= Canoas Air Force Base =

Air base of the Brazilian Air Force

- Base Aérea de Canoas
- Canoas, Rio Grande do Sul in Brazil
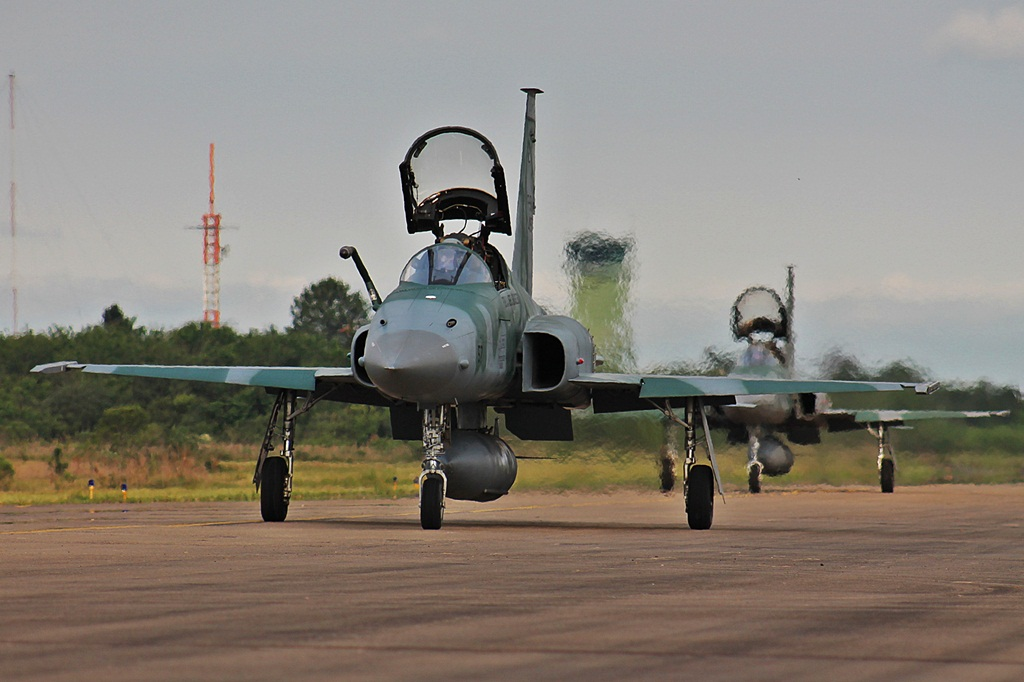
- F-5EM at Canoas during the EXPOAER in 2014

Site information
- Type: Air Force Base
- Code: ALA3
- Owner: Brazilian Air Force
- Controlled by: Brazilian Air Force
- Open to the public: No
- Website: www.fab.mil.br/organizacoes/mostra/445

Location
- Location in Brazil SBCO (Brazil)
- Coordinates: 29°56′44″S 051°08′37″W

Site history
- Built: 1937
- In use: 1944-present

Garrison information
- Current commander: Cel. Av. Luciano Cantuária Pietrani
- Occupants: 1st Squadron of the 14th Aviation Group; 5th Squadron of Air Transportation; 2nd Squadron of the 7th Aviation Group; 2nd Squadron of the 1st Communications and Control Group

Airfield information
- Identifiers: IATA: QNS, ICAO: SBCO, LID: RS9002
- Elevation: 8 metres (26 ft) AMSL
Runways
Direction	Length and surface
13/31	2,751 metres (9,026 ft) Asphalt

Canoas Air Force Base – ALA3 (IATA: QNS, ICAO: SBCO) is a base of the Brazilian Air Force, located in Canoas, near Porto Alegre, Brazil.

== History ==
The history of Canoas Air Force Base begins in 1937, when the 3rd Army Aviation Regiment (3º RAv) was transferred from Santa Maria Air Force Base to Canoas. With the creation of the Air Force Ministry in 1941, the 3º RAv became known as Gravataí Air Force Base. On 21 August 1944, the 3º RAv officially ceased to exist and on the same day Canoas Air Force Base was commissioned.

Due to the catastrophic flooding affecting the State of Rio Grande do Sul and in particular the city of Porto Alegre and its international airport, which caused a suspension of all operations, Canoas Air Force Base handled civilian flights from May 21 to October 21, 2024.

== Units ==
The following units are based at Canoas Air Force Base:

- 1st Squadron of the 14th Aviation Group (1º/14ºGAv) Pampa, using the F-5EM & FM.
- 5th Squadron of Air Transportation (5°ETA) Pégaso, using the C-95BM & CM Bandeirante, C-97 Brasília and C-98A Caravan.
- 2nd Squadron of the 7th Aviation Group (2º/7ºGAv) Phoenix, using the P-95BM Bandeirulha.
- 2nd Squadron of the 1st Communications and Control Group (2º/1ºGCC) Aranha, using radars and equipment for air defense.

== Accidents and incidents ==
- 28 July 1950: a Panair do Brasil Lockheed L-049 Constellation registration PP-PCG operating flight 099 from Rio de Janeiro-Galeão to Canoas Air Force Base struck power lines and crashed on a hill after an aborted landing and while holding in bad weather near São Leopoldo. All 50 passengers and crew died. At the time of the accident, the runway at São João Airport (presently Salgado Filho) was not yet paved, therefore the Constellations used the Air Base runway

== Access ==
The base is located 6 km east of downtown Canoas and 21 km north of downtown Porto Alegre.

== Gallery ==
This gallery displays aircraft that are or have been based at Canoas. The gallery is not comprehensive.

=== Present aircraft ===
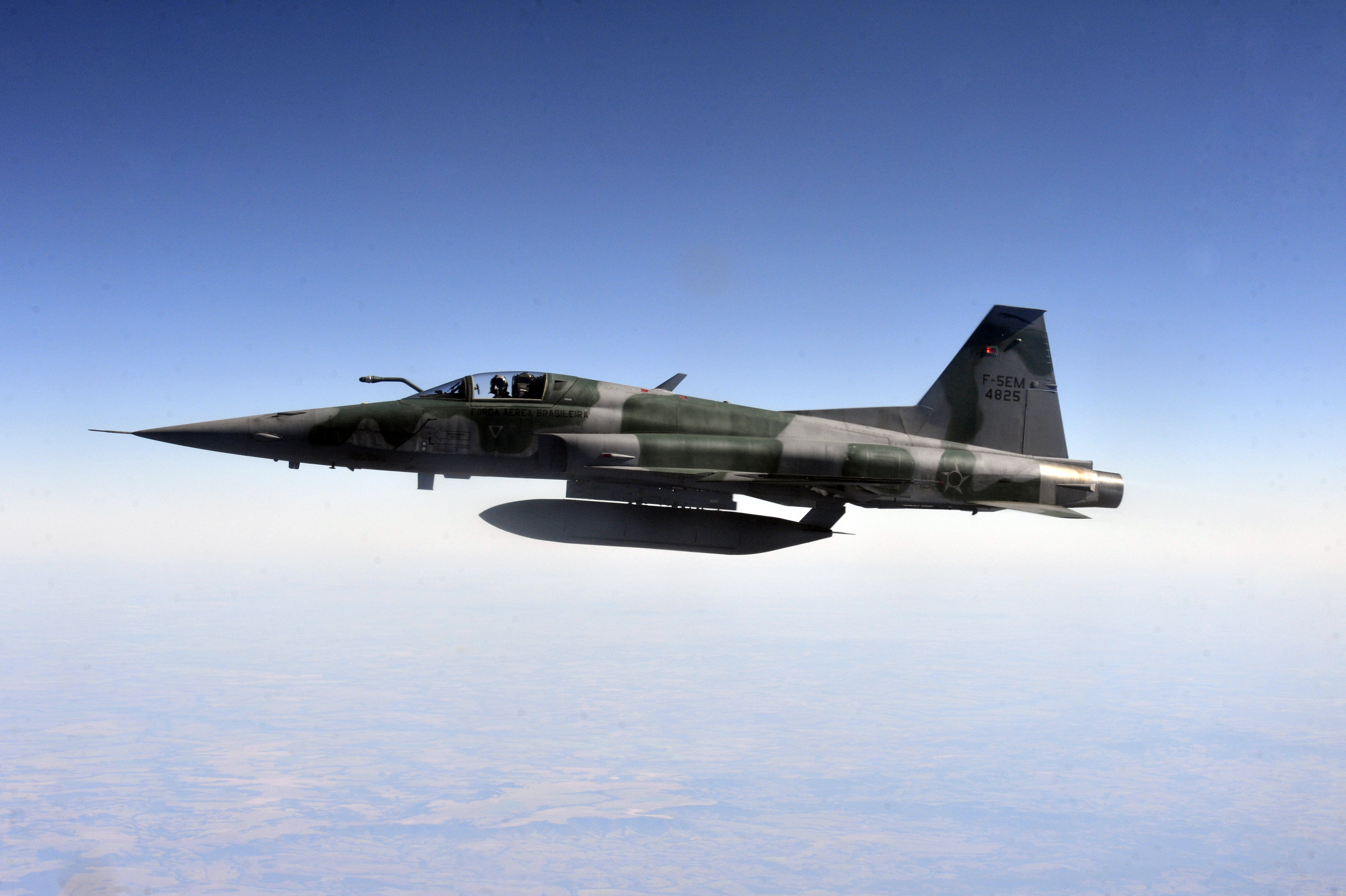
Northrop F-5EM

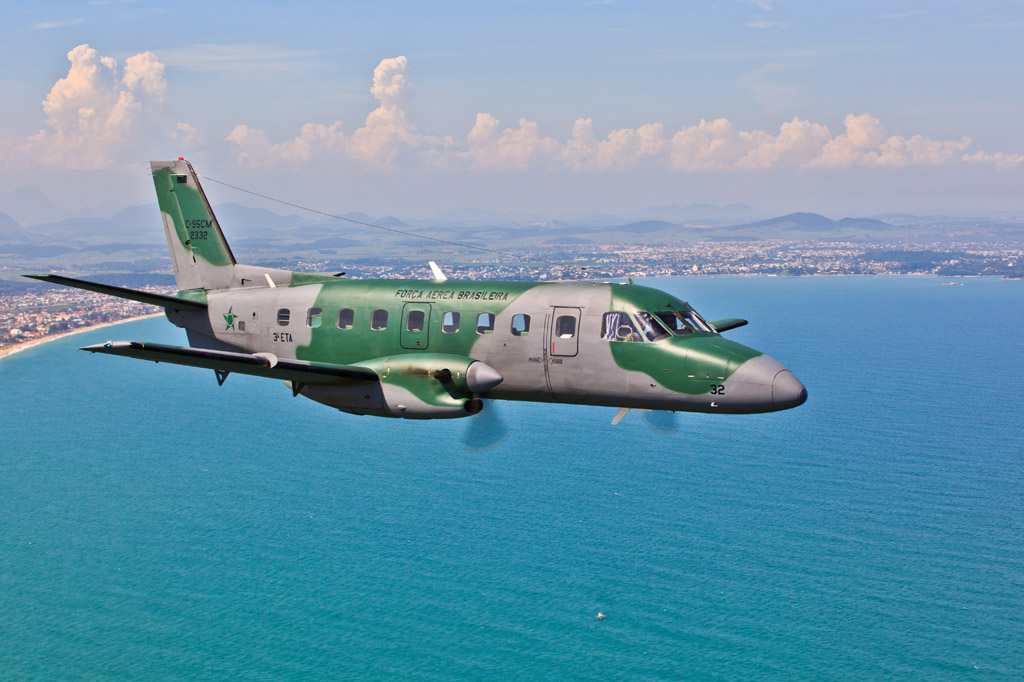
Embraer C-95B Bandeirante

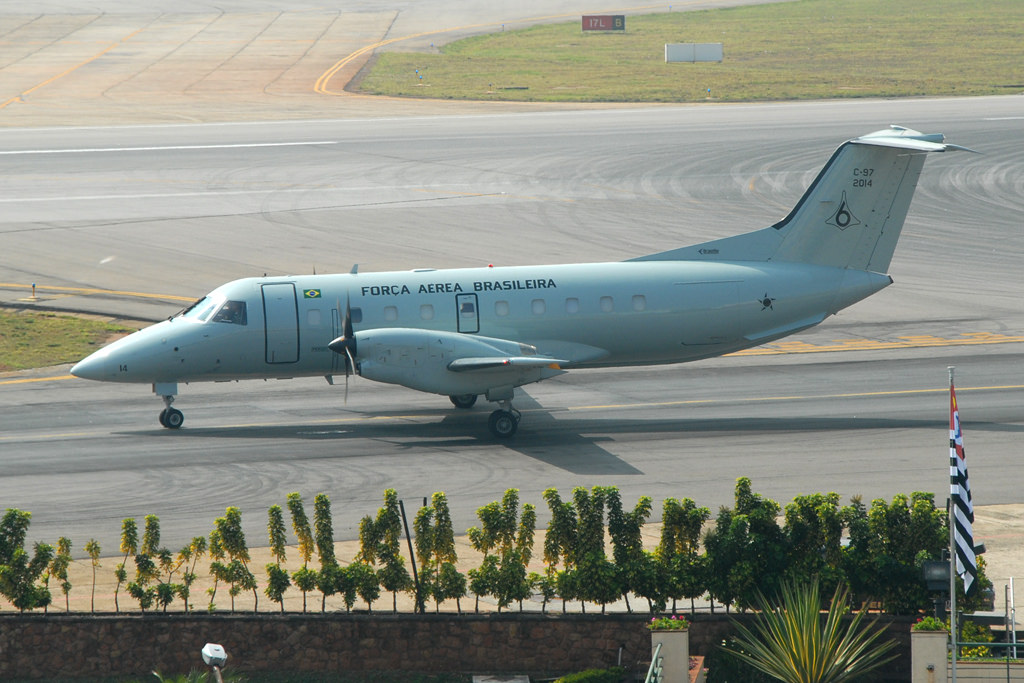
Embraer C-97 Brasília

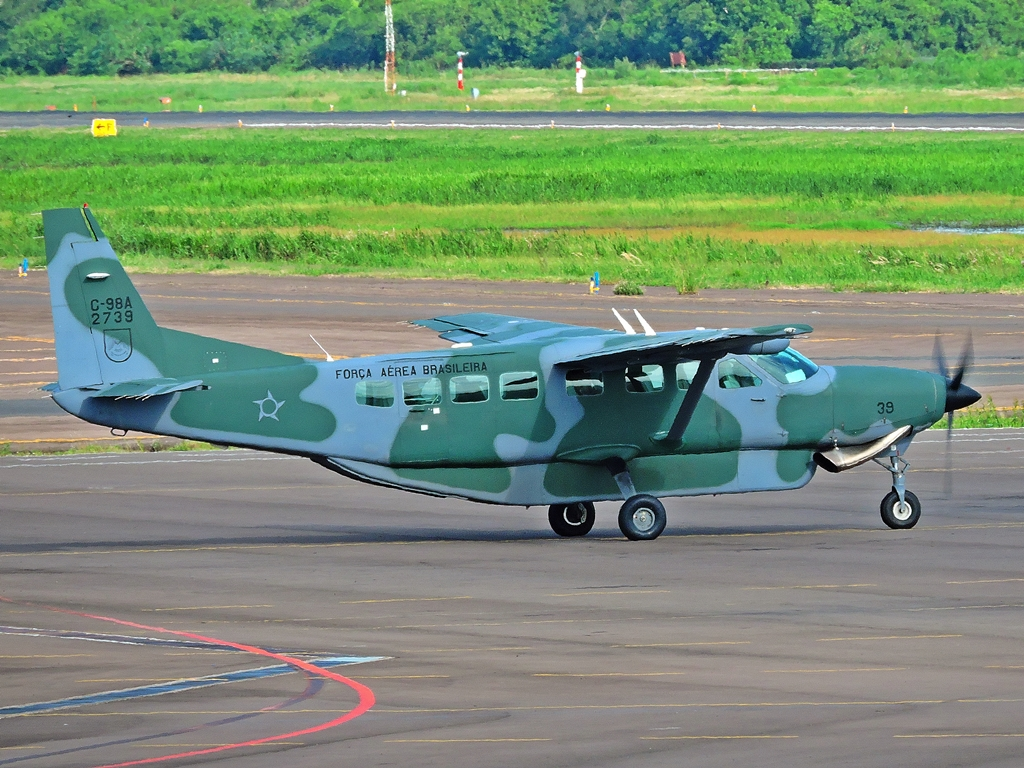
Cessna C-98A Caravan

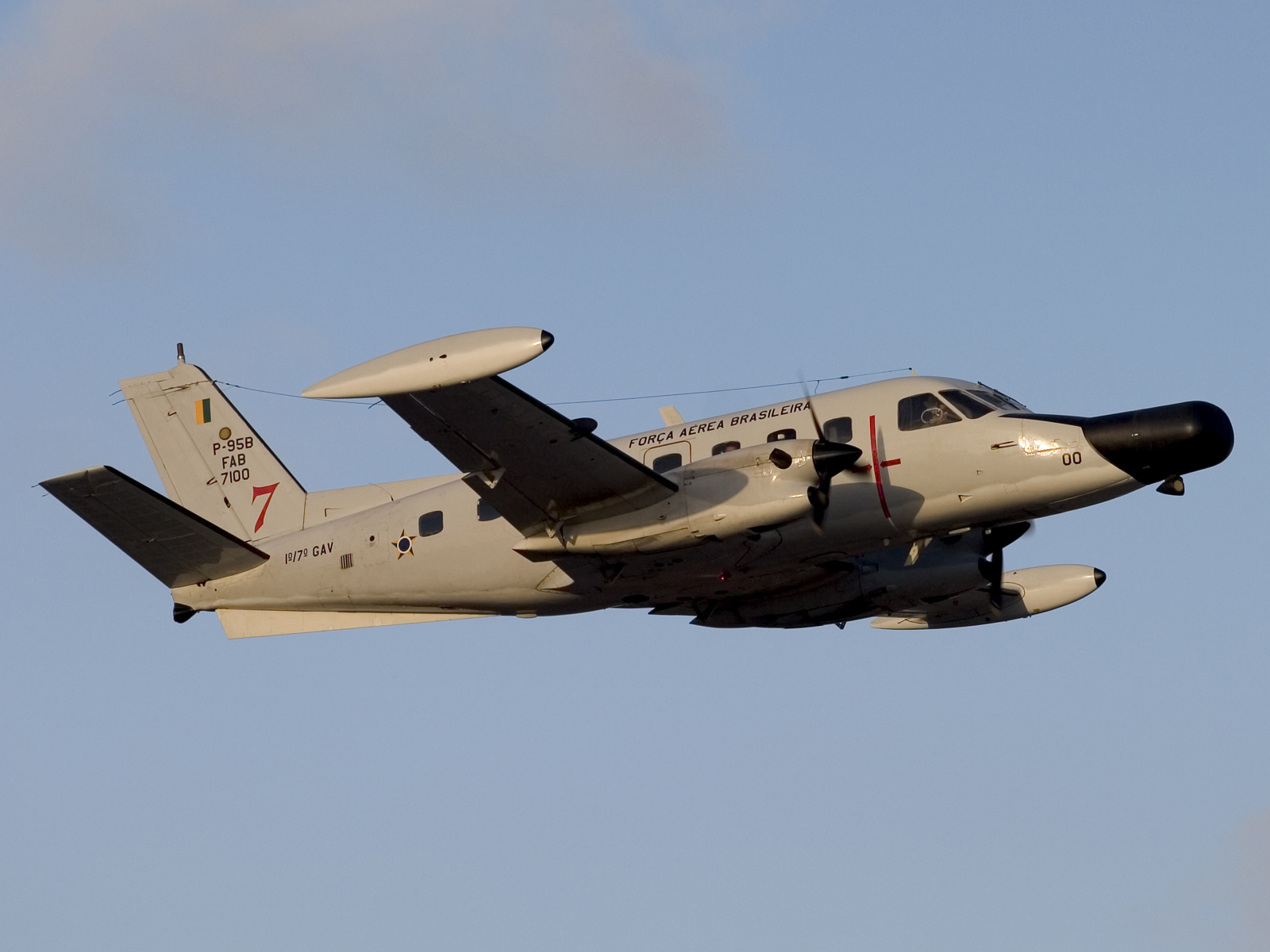
Embraer P-95B Bandeirulha

=== Retired aircraft ===
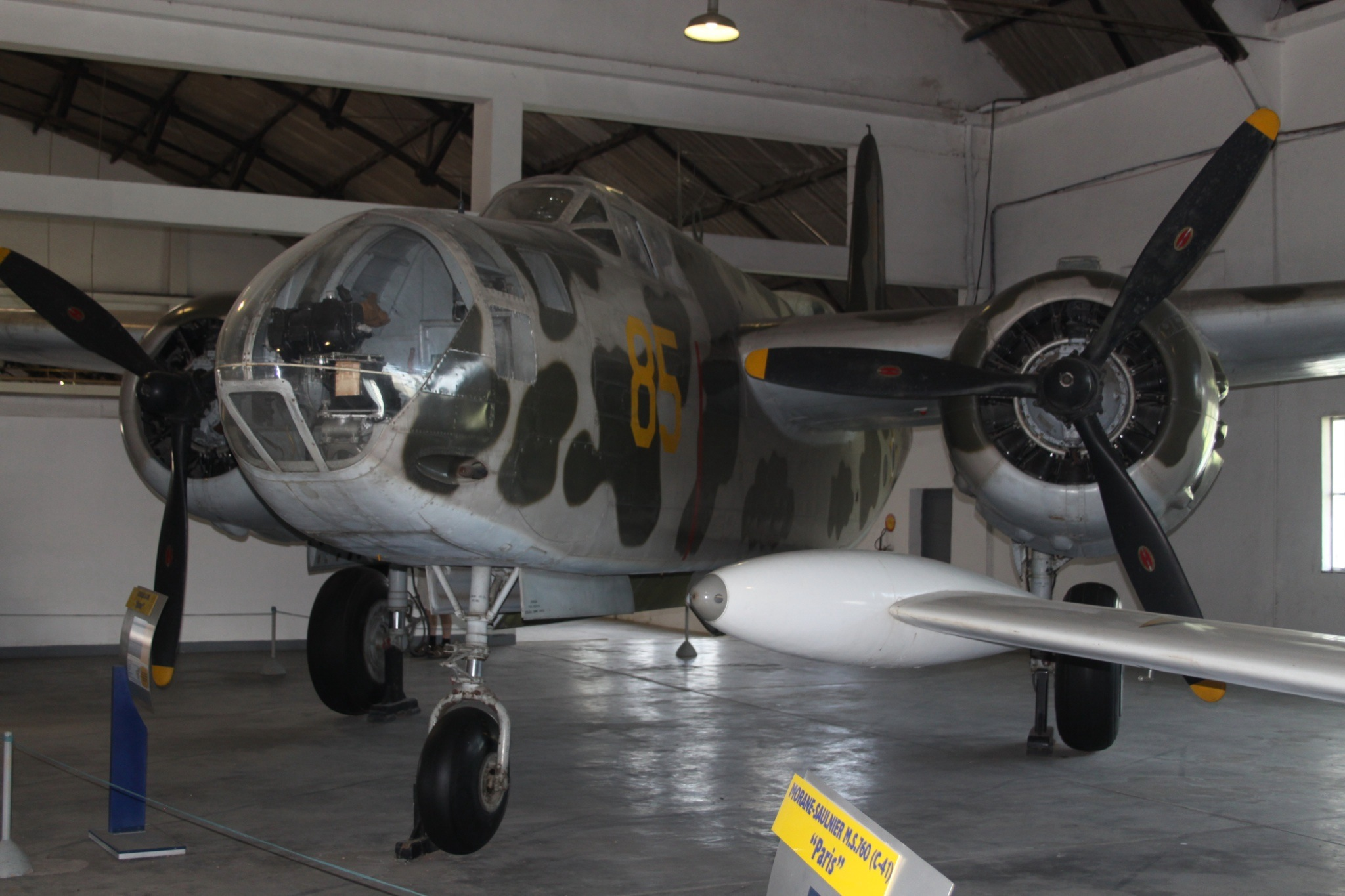
Douglas A-20K Havoc

Curtiss P-40 Warhawk

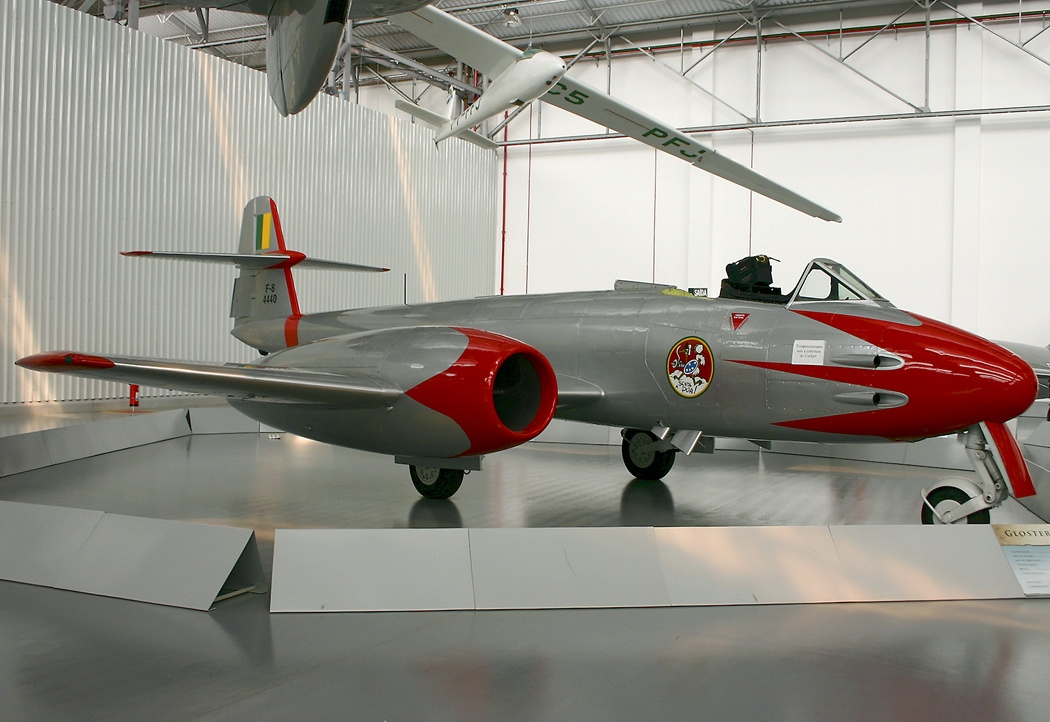
Gloster F-8 Meteor

Lockheed TF-33A T-Bird

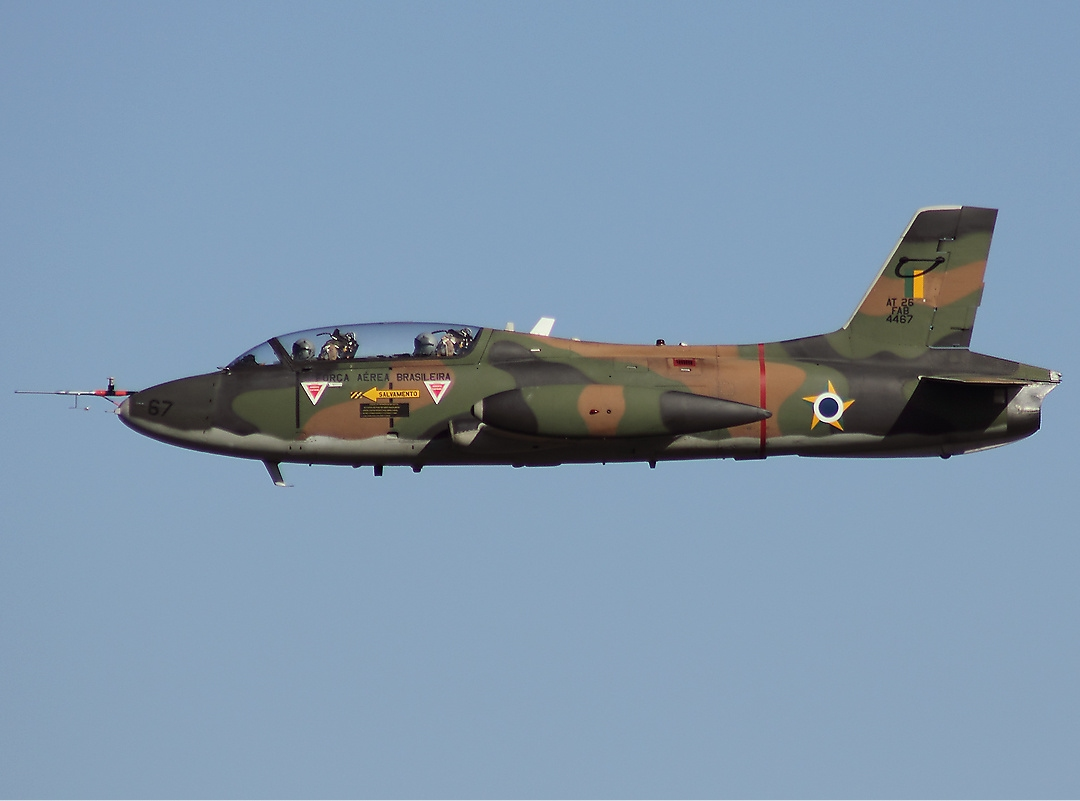
Embraer AT-26 Xavante

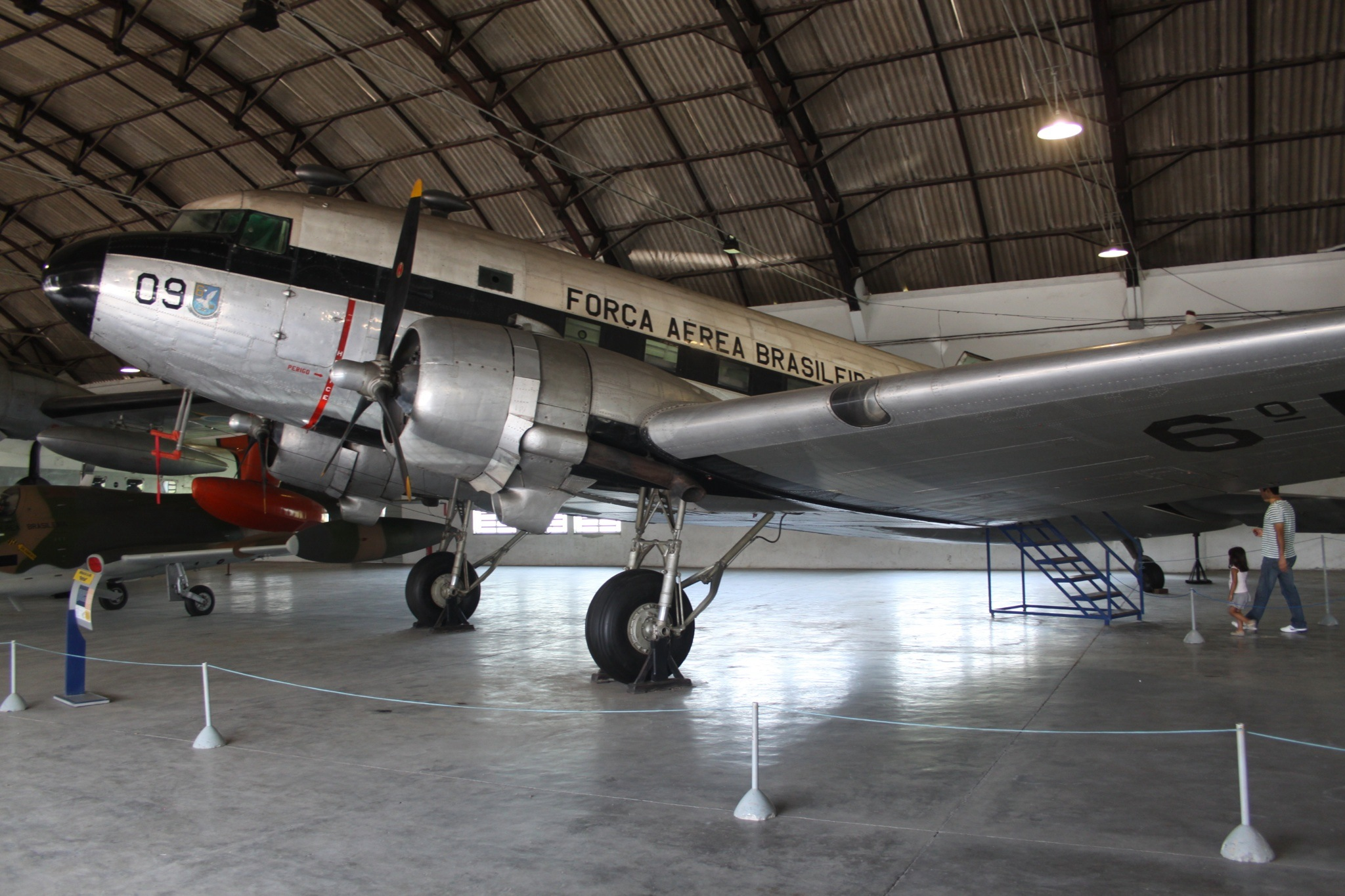
Douglas C-47 Dakota

== See also ==
- List of Brazilian military bases
