= Sudoeste Rio-Grandense =

Coordinates: 30.8908°S 55.5328°W

- Mesoregion
- Country: Brazil
- State: Rio Grande do Sul

Area
  - Total: 62,681.16 km^{2} (24,201.33 sq mi)

Population (2005)
  - Total: 782,195
  - Density: 12.4789/km^{2} (32.3203/sq mi)

Sudoeste Rio-Grandense (Southwest of Rio Grande) is one of the seven mesoregions of the state of Rio Grande do Sul in Brazil. It consists of 19 municipalities, grouped in three microregions:

- Campanha Central
- Campanha Meridional
- Campanha Ocidental
