= São Francisco de Assis, Rio Grande do Sul =

Municipality of Rio Grande do Sul, Brazil

São Francisco de Assis
- Municipality
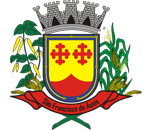
- Flag Coat of arms

- Location within Rio Grande do Sul

- Location in Brazil
- Coordinates: 29°33′1″S 55°7′52″W
- Country: Brazil
- State: Rio Grande do Sul
- Mesoregion: Southwestern Rio Grande do Sul (Sudoeste Rio-Grandense)
- Microregion: Campanha Ocidental
- Founded: January 4, 1884

Area
  - Total: 2,503.9 km^{2} (966.8 sq mi)
- Elevation: 151 m (495 ft)

Population (2020)
  - Total: 18,205
  - Density: 7.2707/km^{2} (18.831/sq mi)
- Demonym: Assissense
- Time zone: UTC−3 (BRT)
- Postal code: 97610-xxx
- IBGE code: 4318101
- Website: saofranciscoassis.rs.gov.br

São Francisco de Assis is a Brazilian municipality in the western part of the state of Rio Grande do Sul. It has a population of 18,205 (2020). Its elevation is 151 m. It has an area of 2,530.9 km^{2} (977.2 sq mi). It is located 434 km west of the state capital of Porto Alegre. The nickname of the city is Sao Chico.

The city is situated by the Jaguari, near the city of Santa Maria. They plant soy and produce milk. The city had been showing significant growth, compared to the last decade.

== Notable people ==
- Inah Canabarro Lucas (1908-2025), supercentenarian and oldest living person in the world from December 29, 2024 to April 30, 2025

== See also ==
- List of municipalities in Rio Grande do Sul
