= Total Linhas Aéreas =

Brazilian airline

TOTAL Linhas Aéreas
IATA	ICAO	Call sign
L1	TTL	TOTAL
- Founded: 1988; 38 years ago
- AOC #: 9,934 - December 5, 2022
- Hubs: Curitiba Afonso Pena International Airport
- Secondary hubs: Manaus Eduardo Gomes International Airport
- Focus cities: São Paulo Guarulhos Airport
- Fleet size: 5 (+4) (as of December 2024)
- Destinations: 7 (as of December 2024)
- Parent company: Cliclog (Holding)
- Headquarters: Curitiba, Brazil
- Key people: Paulo Almada Junior (CEO); Ademir Knop (President)
- Website: www.voetotal.com.br

Notes
- In September 2026, operations were suspended indefinitely.

Total Linhas Aéreas, stylized as TOTAL Linhas Aéreas, is an airline based in Brasília, Brazil, founded in 1988. It operates cargo and charter services. According to the National Civil Aviation Agency of Brazil (ANAC), between January and December 2023, TOTAL Linhas Aéreas carried 1,347 passengers on charter flights and had 0.1% of the domestic market share in terms of revenue passenger kilometers (RPK), making it the tenth largest domestic airline, while transporting over 21,000 tons of cargo and had 6.4% of the domestic market share in terms of revenue tonne kilometer (RTK), making it the fourth largest cargo airline in Brazil.

Its activities were suspended by order of the National Civil Aviation Agency of Brazil on September 1, 2026.

== History ==
=== Establishment ===
The airline has its origins in 1988 as air taxi company called Total Aero-táxi, owned by Grupo Empresarial Rota.

==== Acquisition by Grupo Sulista and transformation ====
In December 1994, Transportadora Sulista S/A, one of the largest road transport organizations in the country, headquartered in Curitiba, Paraná, purchased 100% of the shares of Total Aero-táxi and then began a restructuring process to make the company capable of operating in the regular transport segment. On that date, TOTAL's fleet already consisted of eight aircraft, including one Beech 99, six Embraer EMB-110 Bandeirante and one Embraer EMB-120 Brasília Quick Change (QC).

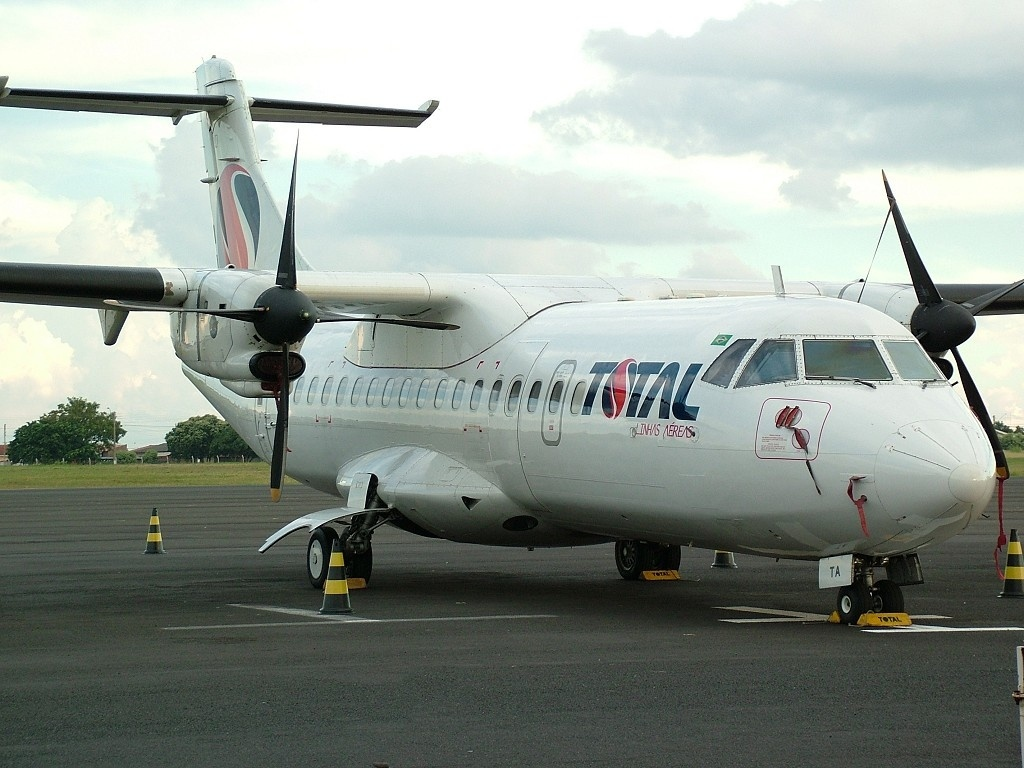
ATR 42 used for charter flights at São José do Rio Preto Airport

Former Total Linhas Aéreas logo

=== Early years and regional expansion (1995-2006) ===
In January 1996, the process came to fruition with the receipt of the Air Operator Certificate (CHETA, in portuguese) from DAC (the extinct Department of Civil Aviation, replaced in 2005 by ANAC). From that moment on, Total Aero-táxi became a regular airline, becoming a company approved according to RBHA-121 (Brazilian Aeronautical Homologation Regulation) and being able to operate aircraft of any category.

In 1999, Total participated with Interbrasil STAR and TABA in the creation of a shuttle service called Regional Air Bridge between Rio de Janeiro-Santos Dumont and Belo Horizonte-Pampulha using mostly Total's ATR 42-300 fleet. However, the agreement was dissolved a year later, in 2000, when Total began to strengthen its own operations and expand rapidly.

==== 2000s ====
In 2001, Total incorporated its first Boeing 727 for cargo operations, began retiring the Embraer EMB-110 Bandeirante and EMB-120 Brasília fleet and started incorporating ATR 42-500 and ATR 72-200 turboprops, becoming the first operator of the model in Brazil and positioning itself as the largest operator of Franco-Italian ATR turboprops in the country.

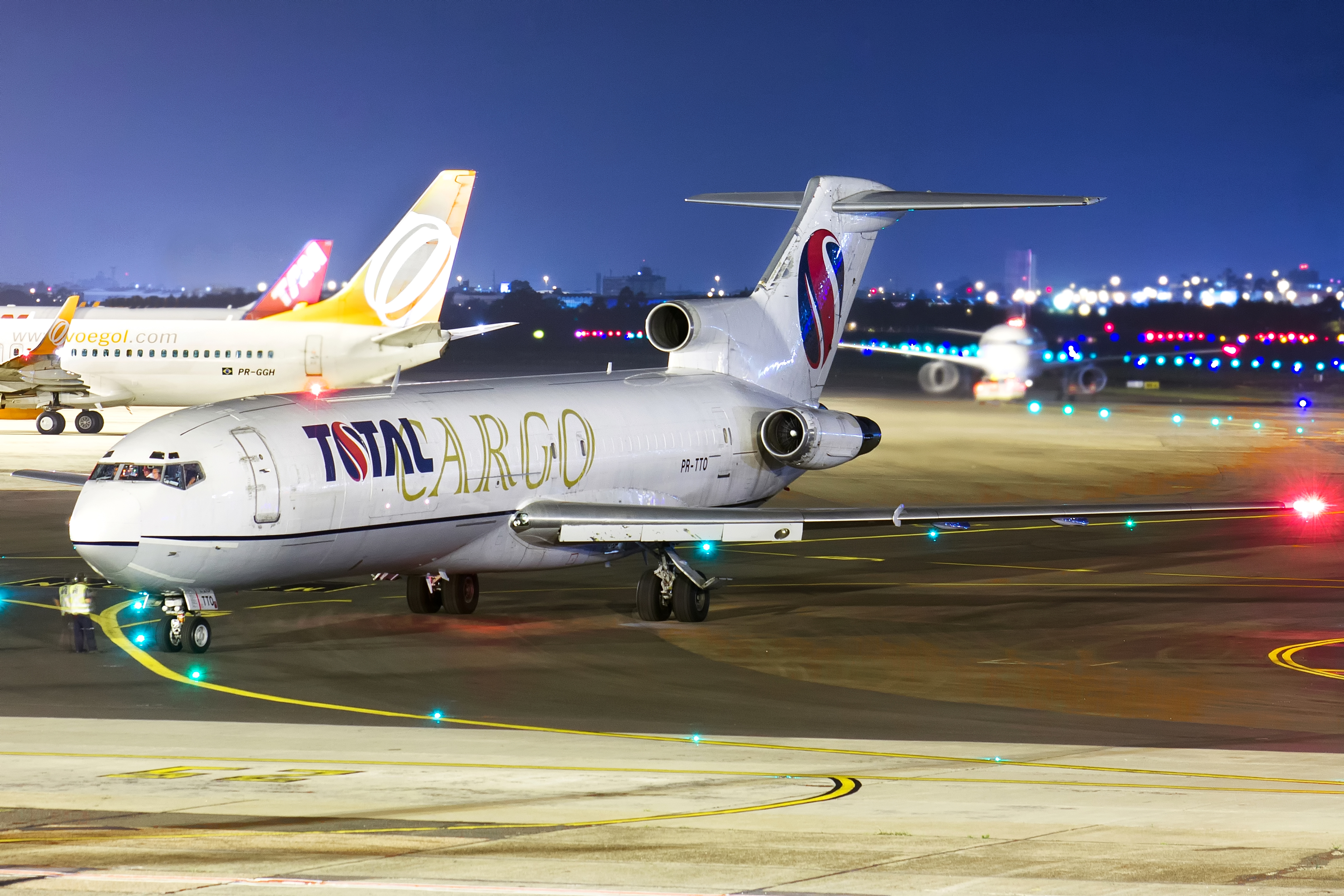
Boeing 727-200F at Porto Alegre

In 2006, it overtook Rico Linhas Aéreas and became the largest Brazilian regional airline in terms of fleet size and number of passengers carried, operating 17 turboprops and having transported more than 721,000 passengers. At its peak, Total won the award from Avião Revue magazine for the Best Regional Airline in Brazil for two consecutive years, in 2006 and 2007.

=== Merger with TRIP Linhas Aéreas (2006-2024) ===
On Nov 13, 2007 TRIP Linhas Aéreas and Total Linhas Aéreas agreed to merge, and in May 2008, after approval by the National Civil Aviation Agency of Brazil (ANAC), the merger was concluded. According to this agreement, all passenger services were transferred to TRIP charter and cargo flights remained under the brand Total Linhas Aéreas.

==== 2010s ====
In May 2012, days before the announced purchase of TRIP Linhas Aéreas by Azul Brazilian Airlines, TRIP and Total were separated. However, Total decided to continue with only cargo and charter flights operations.

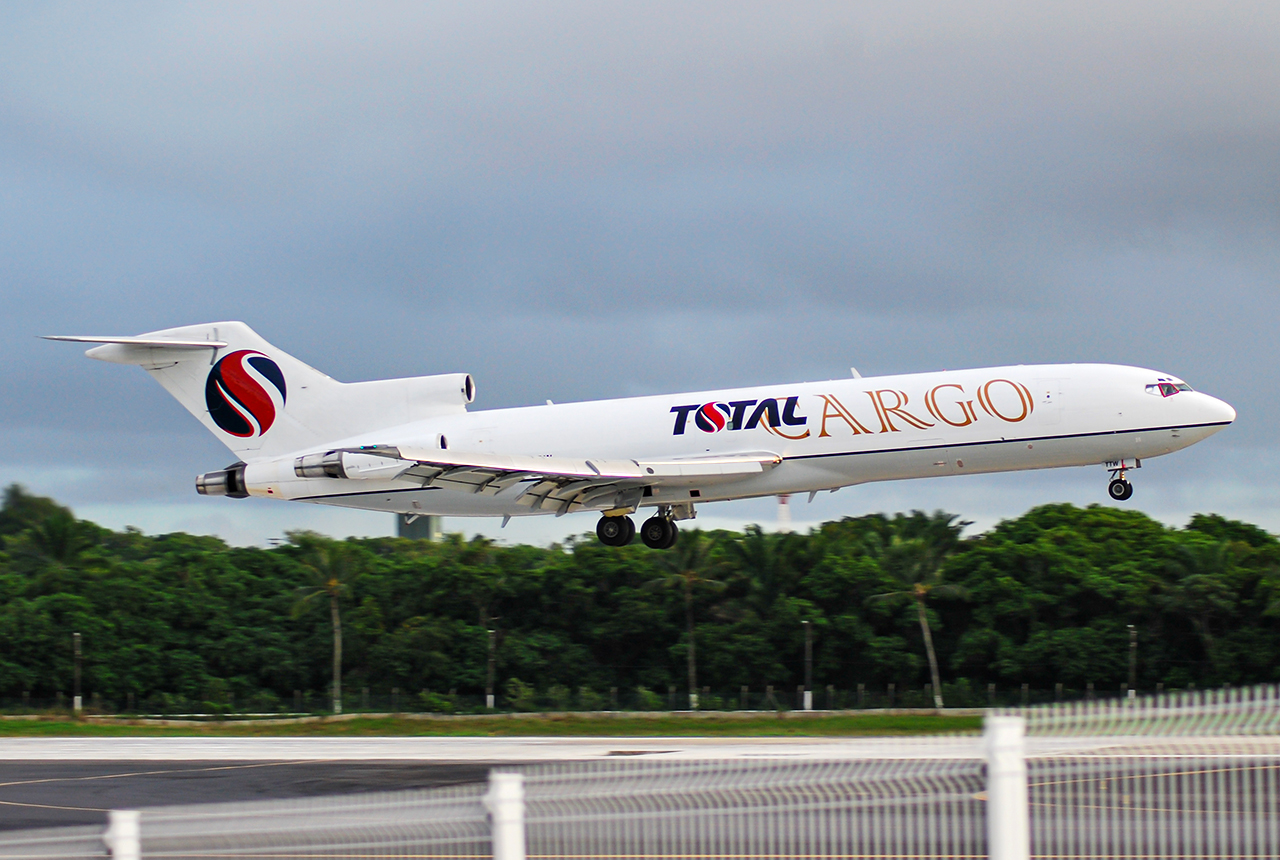
Boeing 727-200F landing at Salvador Bahia Airport

After handing over commercial operations to TRIP, Total Linhas Aéreas maintained a fleet of four ATR-42 for regular charter flights, particularly for Petrobras in Amazonas and five Boeing 727-200F for cargo and nightmail flights as per contract with Brazilian Post and Telegraph Corporation (ECT), also known as Correios, and the Central Bank of Brazil, among others.

==== 2020s ====
On May 24, 2021, it received the first Boeing 737 in its history, the Boeing 737-45D(SF) which, according to speculation, will be used to start the retirement process of its veteran Boeing 727 fleet. The aircraft was leased and received the colors of the carrier Total Express, which at the end of 2023 launched its own airline, Total Express Linhas Aéreas.

On December 20, 2023, TOTAL Linhas Aéreas announced that it would resume regular passenger flights using ATR-42 and Embraer ERJ-145 aircraft until the end of 2024. The hub of the airline will be Brasília and according to a route map presented at the time, the intention is to serve up to 26 Brazilian cities. On the same occasion a new logo was presented.

On January 7, 2024, TOTAL Linhas Aéreas reserved in the Brazilian Aeronautical Registry (RAB) system the registration for two new ATR 72-500 turboprops, both previously operated by Precision Air of Tanzania and leased from Swala Leasing & Finance company.

On April 9, 2024, Brazilian aviation journalist Solange Galante announced that TOTAL Linhas Aéreas will incorporate its second Boeing 737-400SF in the third week of April; information that was confirmed by the airline itself.

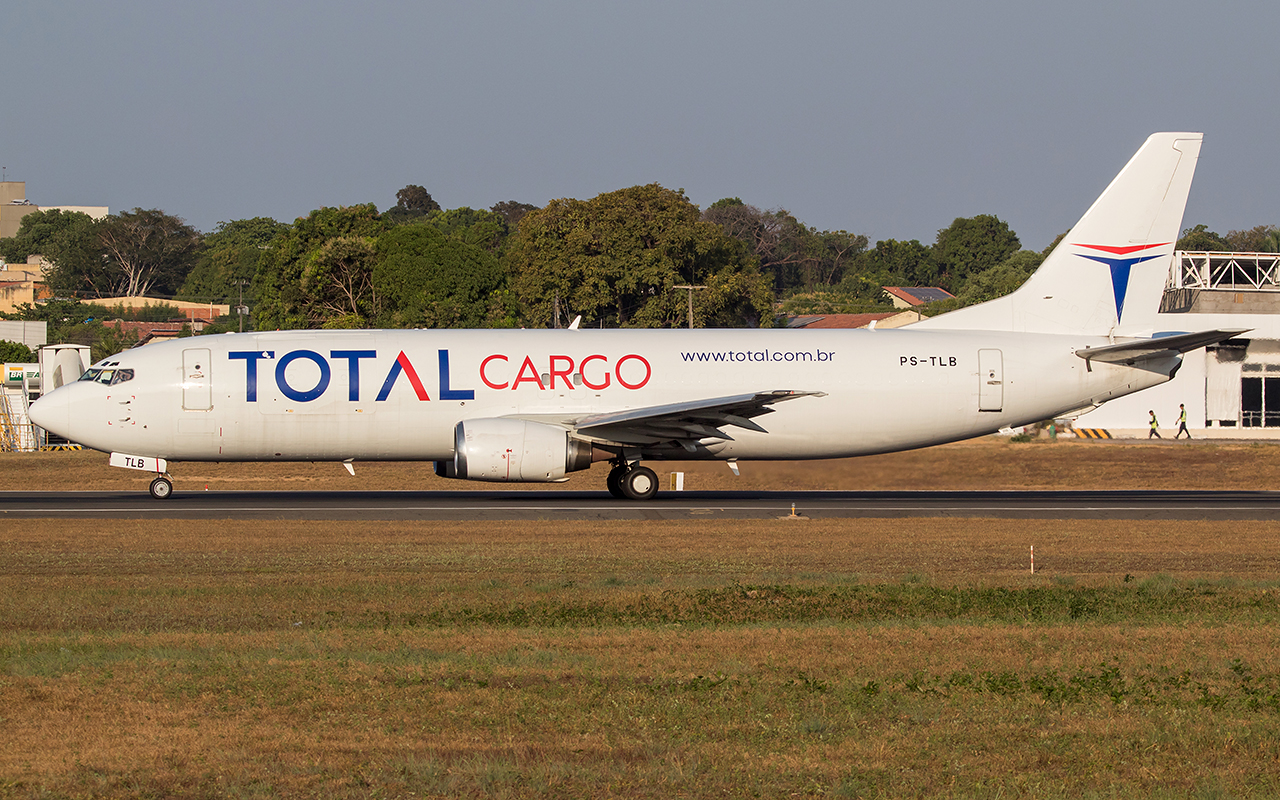
Boeing 737-400SF with the airline's new livery at Teresina Airport

=== Sale by Grupo Sulista (2024-present) ===
In April 2024, 78% of the airline shares that belonged to Alfredo Meister Neto, owner of the Grupo Sulista, who had controlled the company since December 1994, were acquired by Brazilian businessman Paulo Almada Junior, through its Brasília-based holding company, Cliclog, becoming a majority and controlling shareholder of TOTAL Linhas Aéreas. Under its new administration, the airline also transferred its headquarters from Curitiba to Brasília, despite maintaining the operation of the administrative sector in Belo Horizonte, Minas Gerais.

New TOTAL Linhas Aéreas logo

==== New visual identity ====
On April 11, 2024, TOTAL Linhas Aéreas presented its new corporate image. The first plane to receive its new livery was the ATR 42-500 registration PR-TTK (MSN 504), which took off on the same day on a charter flight from Manaus to Georgetown, in Guyana. The painting process was carried out in the airline's hangar located at Eduardo Gomes International Airport. Subsequently, through a comment on its Instagram page, TOTAL Linhas Aéreas reported that the change in the logo occurred due to the sale of the airline by Grupo Sulista, which required the change of the corporate image by the new owners. The company also announced a new president, Ademir Knop, former general director, and also the acquisition of two more Boeing 737-400F to modernize it's fleet.

==== Intention to purchase Chinese aircraft ====
On September 12, 2024, aviation blog AeroIN exclusively revealed that, at the invitation of Chinese aircraft manufacturer Comac, executives from TOTAL Linhas Aéreas would travel to China at the end of October to evaluate the acquisition of Chinese jets for the airline's fleet, which could become the first Western operator of the ARJ21 (C909) and Comac C919 models. According to an internal source at the airline, the intention is to acquire the jets to resume its commercial passenger operations with a focus on the regional market and charters flight.

On September 26, in an interview with Reuters, the airline's CEO and controller, Paulo Almada Junior, confirmed the information revealed exclusively by AeroIN, signaling his trip to China in October to negotiate the acquisition of up to four C919 aircraft for TOTAL's fleet. Government ministers and politicians were contacted by Almada, taking part in the negotiations, which would be in Brazil's interest due to its strong commercial relationship with China and the opportunity to use the reciprocity of bilateralism between the two countries to, in exchange for the acquisition of Chinese aircraft by TOTAL, sell Embraer aircraft on the Chinese market.

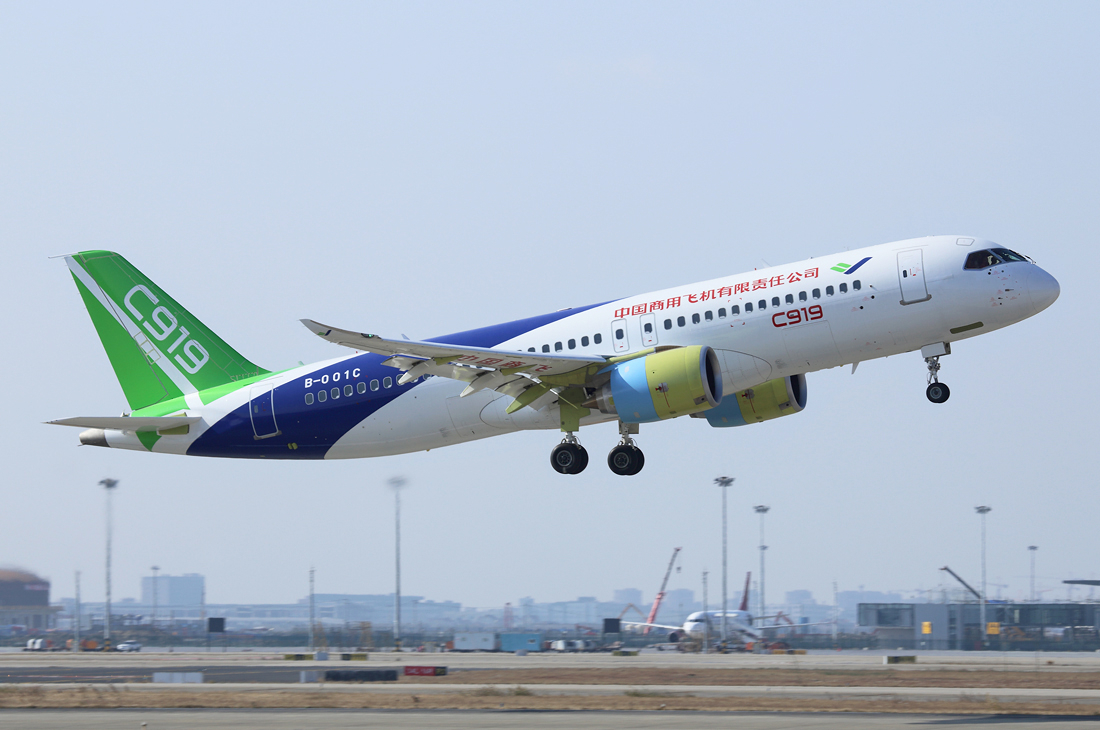
If confirmed, TOTAL is will become the first Comac C919 operator in the West

Almada also revealed that one of the reasons behind the acquisition of Chinese aircraft would be the financing conditions and, mainly, the short delivery time of the aircraft, unlike Western manufacturers that have a waiting list of more than two years, as is the case with Embraer. According to him, around 80% of the acquisition value of the four aircraft would be financed by the China Development Bank (CDB), with installments to be paid between 10 and 12 years. And the first aircraft could be delivered in the first quarter of 2025, with the manufacturer committing to provide training to TOTAL's pilots, flight attendants and mechanics in China, if the purchase is completed.

On November 2, 2024, during his participation in a panel of CEOs of Latin American airlines at the annual meeting of ALTA (Latin American and Caribbean Air Transport Association) in Nassau, Bahamas, Paulo Almada Junior indirectly confirmed the possible acquisition of the C919 for TOTAL Linhas Aéreas, highlighting in his speech that the company "will bring the aircraft to Brazil, becoming one of the first customers outside of China". However, he did not provide further details on the matter and there has been no official confirmation of the acquisition of the aircraft, either by the airline or by its manufacturer.

==== Resumption of passenger flights ====
During an interview with journalist Solange Galante on YouTube, Paulo Almada, controller and CEO of TOTAL Linhas Aéreas, confirmed the resumption of commercial passenger flights. According to him, in the first phase, the airline will maintain its two ATR 42 turboprops based at Eduardo Gomes International Airport in Manaus to serve routes in the North region, while awaiting the arrival of the ATR 72s that will be based at Congonhas Airport in São Paulo to serve routes in the Southeast region.

In order to resume commercial flights, TOTAL Linhas Aéreas is finalizing a heavy maintenance process on the ATR 42-500, registration PR-TKB (MSN 610), which had been stored for 10 years in the airline's hangar in Manaus. Both turboprops in the fleet are also undergoing a passenger cabin reconfiguration process and will receive new, renovated interiors with new seats.

On November 28, 2024, through its website, TOTAL Linhas Aéreas uploaded those that will be its first commercial destinations for the resumption of regular passenger flights from Manaus, in the North region of Brazil, however, there is still no set date to start them; they are: Parintins, Boa Vista and Porto Velho. According to the CEO, Paulo Almada, the airline's intention is to start them in the first half of 2025.

== Destinations ==
As of November 2024 Total Linhas Aéreas regularly operated services to the following destinations in Brazil:

Base
Future
Focus city
Terminated

TOTAL Linhas Aéreas destinations
State	City	Airport	Notes
Amazonas
Amazonas	Carauari	Carauari Airport	opf Petrobras
Amazonas	Manaus	Eduardo Gomes International Airport	Hub
Amazonas	Parintins	Júlio Belém Airport	TBA
Amazonas	Porto Urucu (Coari)	Porto Urucu Airport	opf Petrobras
Amazonas	Espírito Santo		
Vitória	Espírito Santo	Eurico de Aguiar Salles Airport	opf Correios
Paraná
Paraná	Curitiba	Afonso Pena International Airport	Hub opf Correios
Rondônia
Rondônia	Porto Velho	Governador Jorge Teixeira de Oliveira International Airport	TBA
Roraima
Roraima	Boa Vista	Boa Vista International Airport	TBA
Rio de Janeiro
Rio de Janeiro	Rio de Janeiro	Galeão Antonio Carlos Jobim International Airport	opf Correios
Rio Grande do Sul
Rio Grande do Sul	Porto Alegre	Salgado Filho International Airport	opf Correios
Santa Catarina
Santa Catarina	Florianópolis	Hercílio Luz International Airport	opf Correios
São Paulo
São Paulo	São Paulo	Guarulhos International Airport	opf Correios

== Fleet ==
=== Current fleet ===
As of August 2025, Total Linhas Aéreas operates the following aircraft:

TOTAL Linhas Aéreas fleet
Aircraft	In service	Orders	Passengers	Note
ATR 72-500	—	3	70	TBD
Boeing 737-400SF	5	—	Cargo	opf Correios
TOTAL	5	4		

=== Gallery ===
TOTAL Linhas Aéreas current fleet

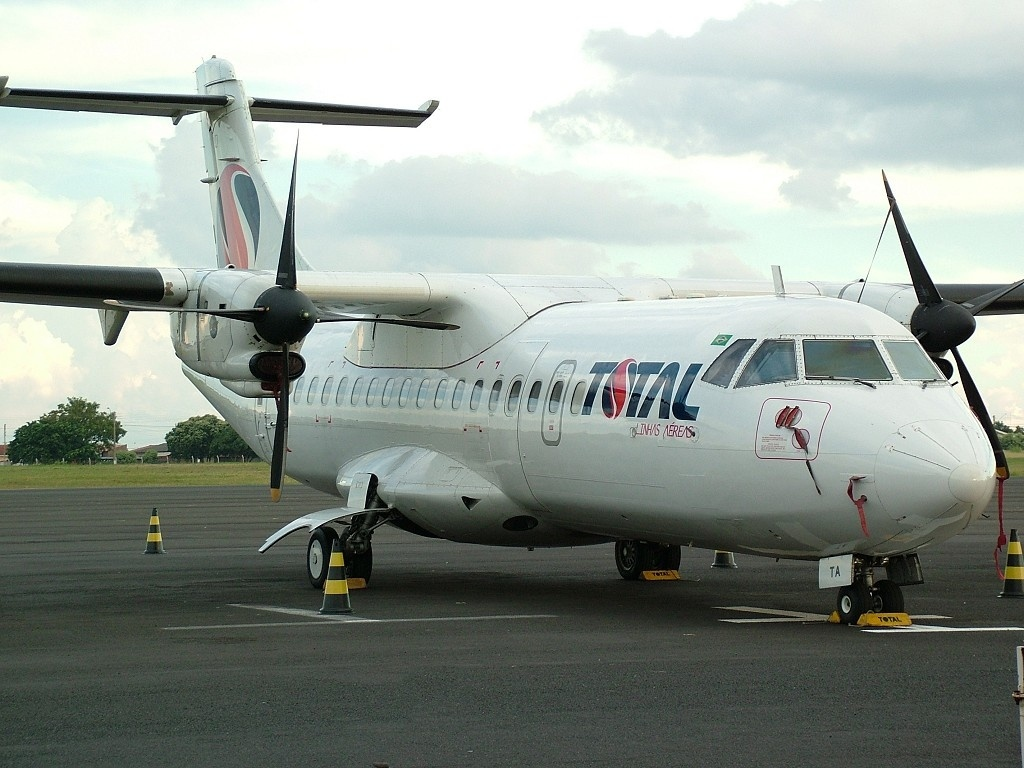
ATR 42-500

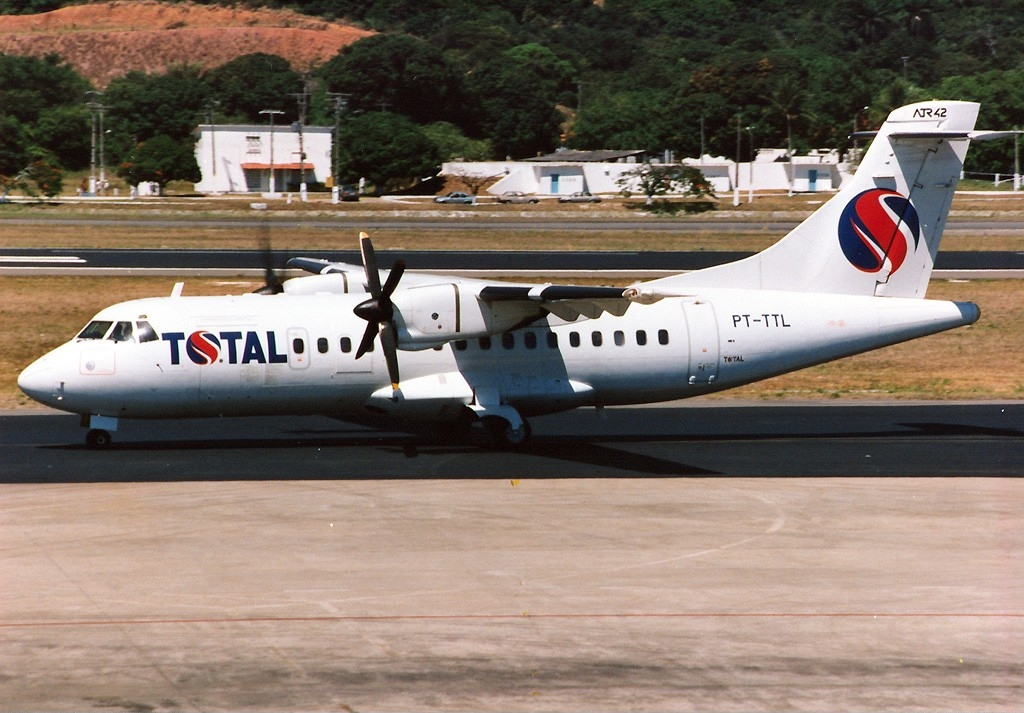
ATR 42-500

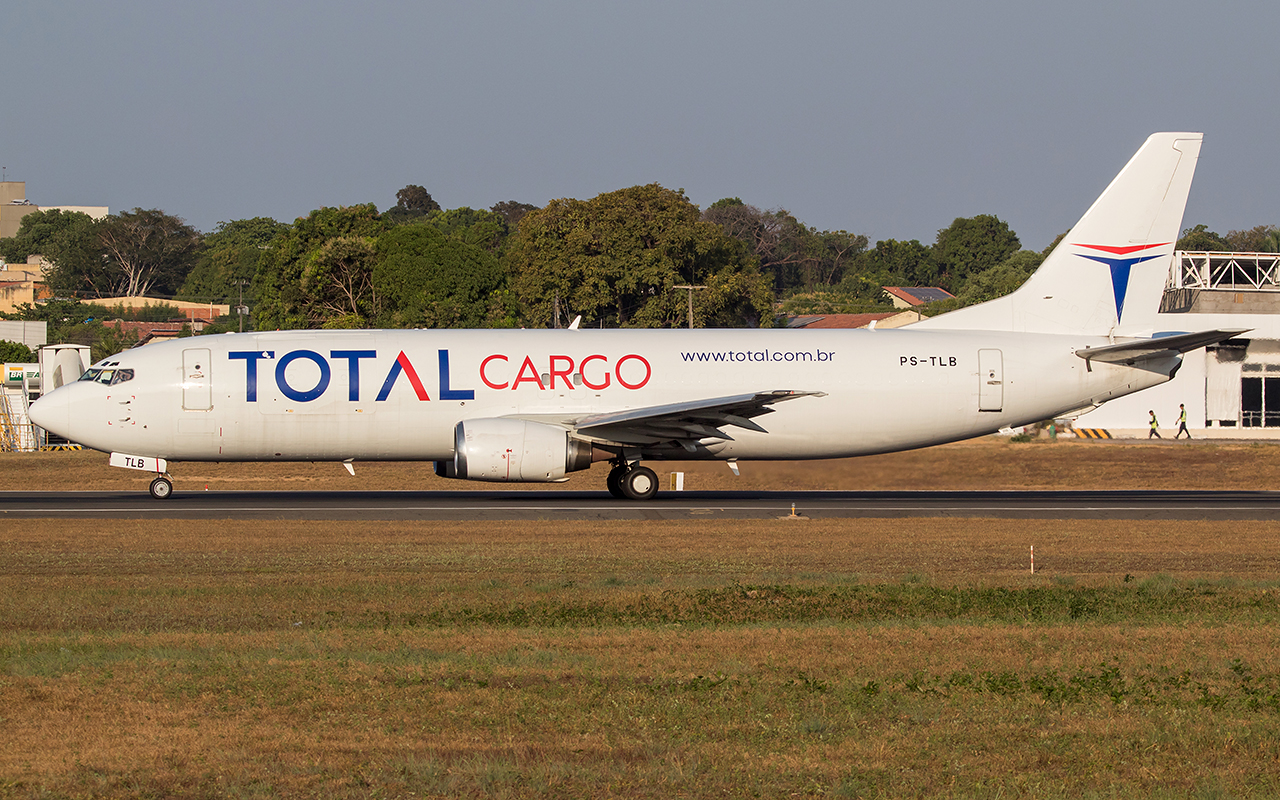
Boeing 737-400SF

=== Fleet development ===
TOTAL Linhas Aéreas began its operations with a Beech 99 aircraft, later expanding to the Embraer EMB-110 Bandeirante and also the Embraer EMB-120 Brasília. All of them were withdrawn from operation in the early 2000s in favor of the larger, more modern and economical turboprops from the Franco-Italian manufacturer Avions de Transport Régional (ATR).

It has been an operator of ATR 42 turboprops since 1999, keeping two active aircraft in the fleet in November 2024, for the transportation of passengers on charter flights. TOTAL's intention is to expand its fleet of the model by incorporating more units of the larger variant, the ATR 72-500. Between January and September 2024, the airline announced negotiations to bring at least five aircraft by the end of the year, in order to resume its regular commercial flights with passengers. By the end of 2025, the intention is to have a fleet of 15 ATR turboprops.

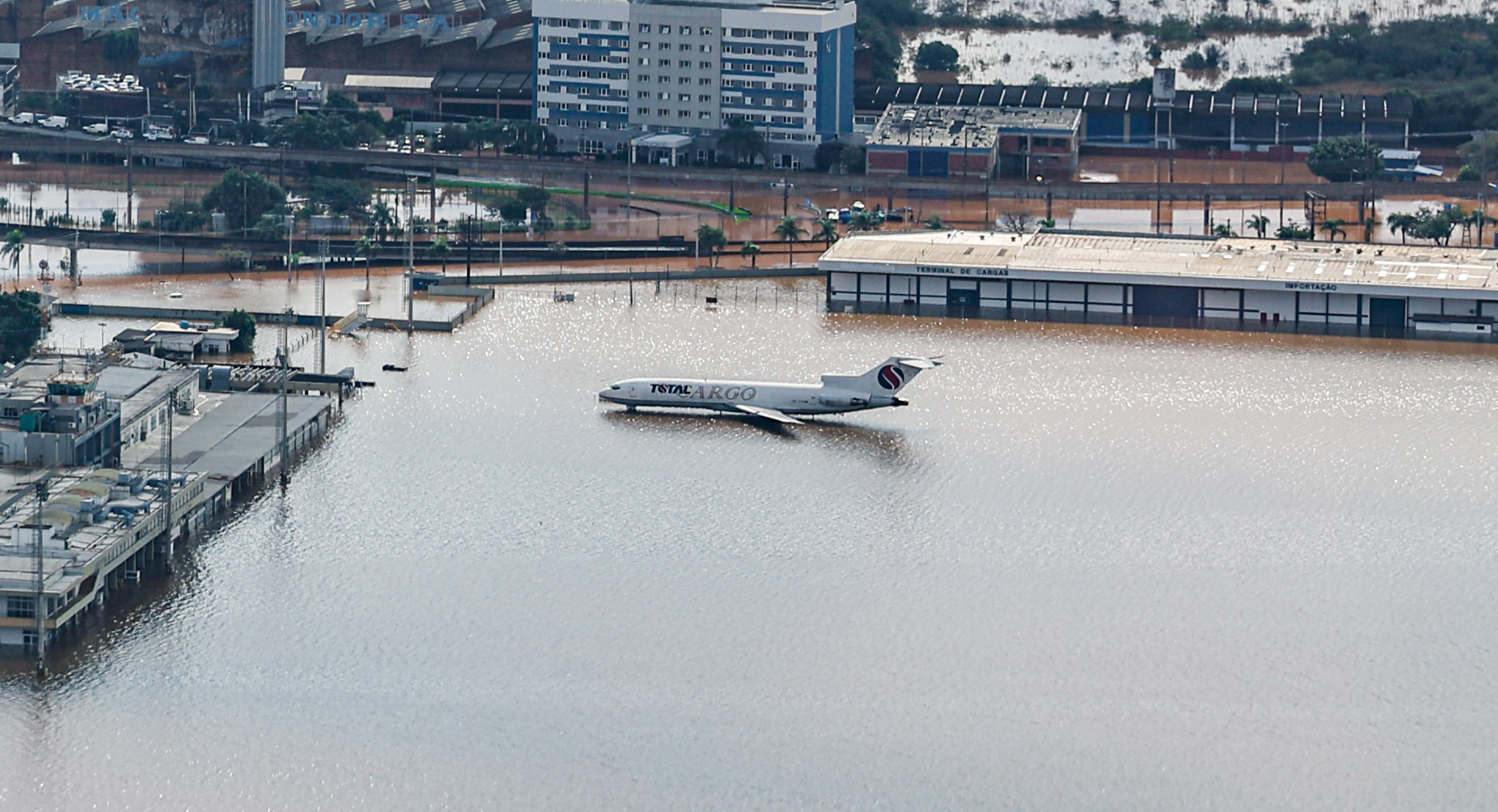
Boeing 727-200F reg. PR-TTP during the 2024 Rio Grande do Sul floods

In 2001, it incorporated its first Boeing 727 for cargo transportation, totaling six aircraft throughout its history. In September 2024, the last three were retired from the fleet; two were sold and one of them, registration PR-TTP, which became world famous through images showing it stuck at Salgado Filho International Airport, in Porto Alegre, during the 2024 Rio Grande do Sul floods, was dismantled.

In 2021, TOTAL received its first Boeing 737-400SF, expanding the fleet to 4 aircraft of the model by August 2024. During an interview with aviation journalist Solange Galante, the airline's CEO, Paulo Almada Junior, revealed that the intention is to add three more aircraft of the model by the end of 2025, to reach a fleet of seven Boeing 737s in the cargo fleet.

In September 2024, it was revealed that TOTAL Linhas Aéreas had entered into negotiations with Chinese aircraft manufacturer Comac for the acquisition of up to four C919 aircraft, which will be used on charter and ACMI (wet lease) flights for airlines in Latin America and Africa. In parallel, the airline also announced its intention to incorporate up to three pre-owned Embraer E195s for use on demand on charter flights.

=== Former fleet ===
Retired TOTAL Linhas Aéreas fleet
Aircraft	Total	Years of operation	Note
ATR 42-300	12	1996-2015	Reg. PT-MTS crashed on Flight 5561
ATR 42-500	2		
ATR 72-200	2	2005-2008	—
Beechcraft Model 99	1	1994–1995	—
Embraer 110 Bandeirante	6	1988-2002	—
Embraer 120 Brasília	3	1993-2002	—
Boeing 727-200F	6	2001-2024	Last Boeing 727 operator in Brazil

== Accidents and incidents ==
- 14 September 2002: Total Linhas Aereas Flight 5561 between São Paulo-Guarulhos and Londrina crashed while en route near Paranapanema. The crew of 2 died.
- 30 May 2014: an ATR 42-500 took off from Porto Urucu Airport, on a domestic flight to Manaus. During the rotation, the captain noticed that the aircraft hit a tapir. Subsequently, the right main landing gear did not retract. The hydraulic systems were affected by the collision and the crew decided to proceed to Manaus with the landing gear down. During landing, after the touchdown of the right landing gear on the ground, the aircraft turned to the right. The crew managed to keep the aircraft within the lateral limits of the runway. None of the 59 occupants on board were injured.
- 5 May 2024: the Boeing 727-200 registration PR-TTP was stuck at Salgado Filho Porto Alegre International Airport after the apron and runways were flooded during the 2024 Rio Grande do Sul floods. The aircraft was subsequently retired.
- 9 November 2024: A Boeing 737-400SF, registration PS-TLB, operating Flight 5682 from Eurico de Aguiar Salles Airport in Vitória, made an emergency landing at Guarulhos International Airport in São Paulo, with a fire in the cargo hold. Shortly after landing, the fire spread rapidly to the rear section. The pilots evacuated quickly and there were no injuries. The aircraft was a total loss due to the severe fire.

== See also ==
- List of airlines of Brazil
