= Stewart International Airport =

Airport near Newburgh, New York, U.S.

New York Stewart International Airport Stewart International Airport

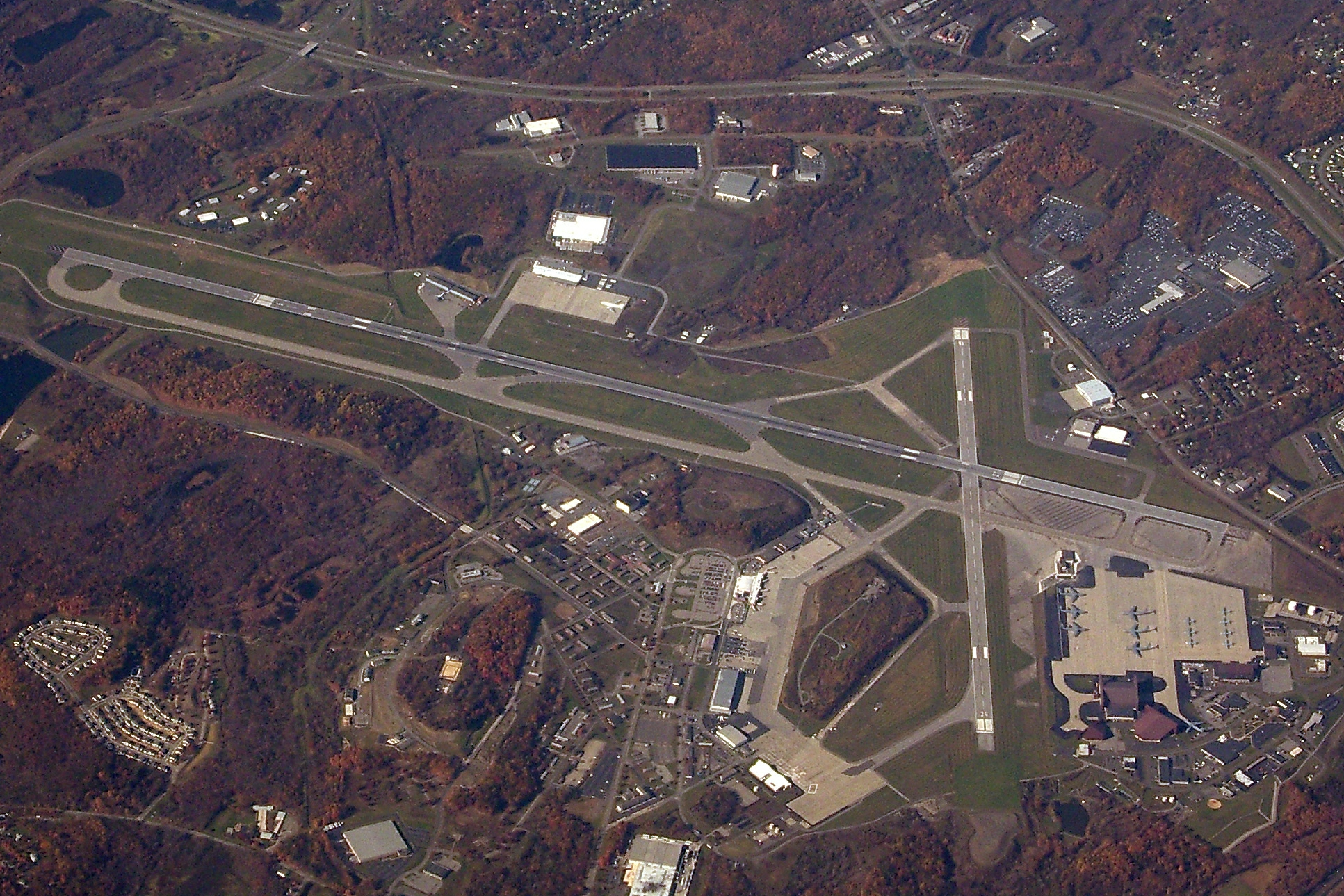
- New York Stewart International Airport, as seen from the air in 2007
- IATA: SWF; ICAO: KSWF; FAA LID: SWF

Summary
- Airport type: Public/military
- Owner: State of New York
- Operator: Port Authority of New York and New Jersey
- Serves: Hudson Valley; Catskills; New York metropolitan area
- Location: 1180 First Street, New Windsor, NY
- Elevation AMSL: 491 ft (150 m)
- Coordinates: 41°30′15″N 074°06′17″W
- Website: swfny.com

Maps
- FAA airport diagram
- Interactive map of New York Stewart International Airport

Runways
Direction	Length		Surface
Direction	ft	m	Surface
09/27	11,817	3,602	Asphalt
16/34	6,004	1,830	Asphalt

Helipads
Number	Length		Surface
Number	ft	m	Surface
H1	40	12	Asphalt

Statistics
- Aircraft operations (year ending 4/30/2023): 37,133
- Based aircraft (2023): 54
- Total domestic passengers (12 months ending Mar 2018): 321,000
- Sources: FAA and PANYNJ

New York Stewart International Airport (IATA: SWF, ICAO: KSWF, FAA LID: SWF) – colloquially known as Stewart International Airport, is a public/military airport in Orange County, New York, United States. It is in the southern Hudson Valley, west of Newburgh, south of Kingston, and southwest of Poughkeepsie, approximately 60 miles (97 km) north of Manhattan, New York City.

Stewart Airport is located within the towns of Newburgh and New Windsor. It is included in the Federal Aviation Administration (FAA) National Plan of Integrated Airport Systems for 2017–2021, in which it is categorized as a non-hub primary commercial service facility.

Developed in the 1930s as a military base to allow cadets at the nearby United States Military Academy at West Point to learn aviation, it has grown into a significant passenger airport for the mid-Hudson region and continues as a military airfield, housing the 105th Airlift Wing of the New York Air National Guard and Marine Aerial Refueler Transport Squadron 452 (VMGR-452) of the United States Marine Corps Reserve. The airport was designated as an emergency landing site for the Space Shuttle.

After its closure as a U.S. Air Force base in the 1970s, an ambitious plan by Governor Nelson Rockefeller to expand and develop the airport led to a protracted struggle with local landowners that led to reforms in the state's eminent domain laws but no actual development of the land acquired. In 1981 the 52 American hostages held in Iran made their return to American soil at Stewart.

In 2000 the airport became the first U.S. commercial airport privatized when United Kingdom-based National Express was awarded a 99-year lease on the airport. National Express sold the rights to the airport seven years later; the Port Authority of New York and New Jersey board voted to acquire the remaining 93 years of the lease and later awarded AFCO AvPorts the contract to operate the facility. The Port Authority rebranded the airport as New York Stewart International Airport in 2018 to emphasize its proximity to New York City.

== History ==
=== Stewart Dairy Farm ===
In 1930, Thomas "Archie" Stewart, an early aviation enthusiast and descendant of prominent local dairy farmer Lachlan Stewart, convinced his uncle Samuel Stewart to donate "Stoney Lonesome", split between the towns of Newburgh and New Windsor, to the nearby city of Newburgh for use as an airport. With the city strapped for cash due to the Depression, however, it was unable to develop it in any way.

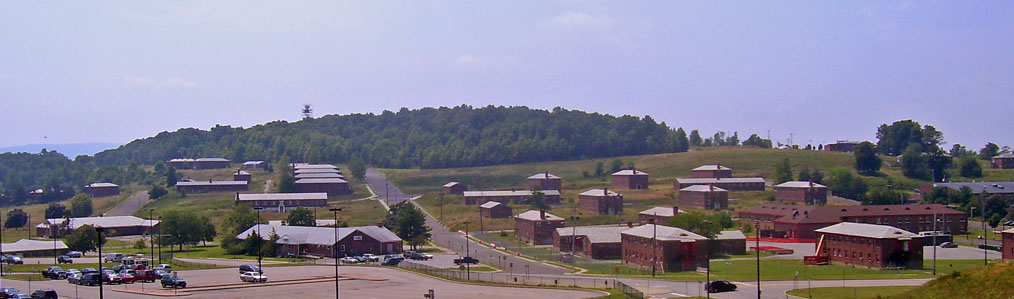
Early 1940s military buildings at Stewart, mostly vacant today

=== Stewart Airfield ===
In 1934, Douglas MacArthur, then superintendent of the United States Military Academy, proposed flight training for cadets at the airport. The city sold the land to the military academy for one dollar. A small dirt airstrip was cleared and graded. One of the gates at USMA has been known as Stoney Lonesome Gate ever since.

During World War II, many barracks and other buildings, which still stand, were built on the base. In January 2008, the Town of New Windsor received a $2.5 million grant from the state to demolish 30–40 buildings as part of the redevelopment of the former base. First Columbia, the developer, said that 20–30 of the buildings could be retained and reused.

=== Stewart Air Force / Air National Guard Base ===
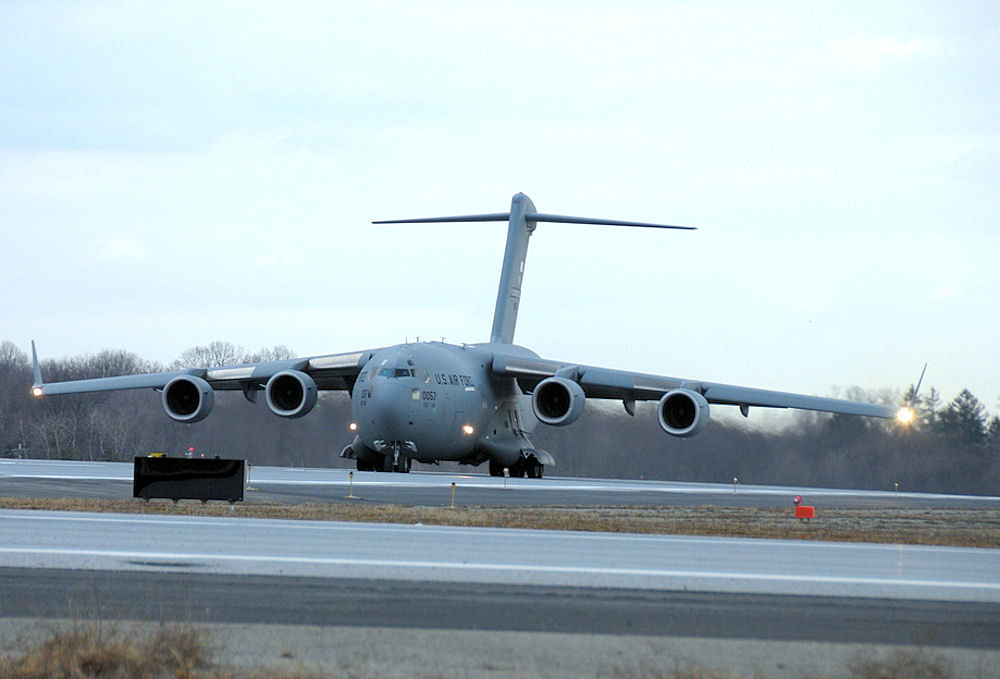
A Boeing C-17A at the ANG base, as seen in 2012

After the creation of the United States Air Force following World War II, the army airfield was converted to an air force base while still being used for training of cadets at West Point. Stewart became the home of Headquarters 1st Region Army Air Defense Command in 1966. It remained so until the deactivation of the Nike Hercules system at the end of 1974. The air force base was deactivated in 1970 and it officially remained unoccupied by the Air Force until 1983, when the 105th Airlift Wing (105 AW) and the 213th Engineer Installation Squadron (213 EIS) of the New York Air National Guard took up quarters. The Air National Guard unit has flown support missions not only for U.S. military operations in Iraq and Afghanistan but also for humanitarian relief efforts.

This area of the airport, now called Stewart Air National Guard Base, was home to the Air Force C-5 Galaxy aircraft before being replaced by the newer and smaller C-17 Globemaster III in 2011. Stewart ANGB also hosted VMGR-452, a Marine Corps Reserve squadron flying the KC-130J, until 2022.

=== Stewart International Airport ===
==== MTA expansion plan ====
In the early 1970s, Governor Nelson Rockefeller's administration saw the potential for Stewart to support the metropolitan area. Its long runway made it particularly attractive for intercontinental service via supersonic transport (SST), then under development in the U.S. and elsewhere.

The Metropolitan Transportation Authority was the first government body to try to convert it into the New York metropolitan area's fourth major airport. It tripled the airport's territory, extending its land well beyond its previous western boundary at Drury Lane, a two-lane rural road. The state government used its eminent domain powers to take 7,500 acres (30 km^{2}) for terminals, runways and a buffer zone expanding the airport from Newburgh into neighboring towns of Montgomery and a small portion of Hamptonburgh. The land was bounded by I-84 to the north, Route 207 along the south and roughly by Rock Tavern and Maybrook in the west.

==== Local opposition ====
Area residents who were already fighting a large power plant proposal at nearby Storm King Mountain fiercely fought the expansion. They took the state to court, ultimately forcing the legislature to write and pass the New York State Eminent Domain Procedure Act, a sweeping overhaul of its existing law on the subject. In order to get the last holdouts off their land, state officials pledged that outside the proposed airport facilities, none of the land taken would ever be redeveloped, a promise that was to haunt them years later.

By the time the land was finally available, the 1973 oil crisis and the attendant increase in the price of jet fuel had forced airlines to cut back, and some of the airport's original backers began arguing it was no longer economically viable. US SST development was canceled in 1971, undercutting another argument for the project. Malcolm Wilson, Rockefeller's successor, put the project on hold; and his successor, Hugh Carey, ended it permanently in 1976.

==== New York State Department of Transportation ownership ====
In early 1981, the 52 U.S. hostages held at the former U.S. embassy in Tehran, Iran, returned to American soil at Stewart International following two weeks at U.S. bases in Germany and 444 days of captivity, ending the Iran hostage crisis. The route they took from Stewart International to West Point is marked today as "Freedom Road."

The next year the state transferred control from MTA to its own Department of Transportation (NYSDOT), with a mandate to improve and develop the airport. Three years later W.R. Grace became the first private tenant when it built a corporate jet hangar, and the following year an industrial park was built nearby. Finally, in 1990, commercial airline service began with American Airlines offering service with three daily round trips to both Chicago and Raleigh/Durham.

===== Continuing development issues =====
As the 1980s wore on, veterans of earlier battles over Stewart returned to start new ones. NYSDOT and the Stewart Airport Commission found themselves overseeing not only the airport but the acres of now-vacant land the state had acquired a decade before. After turning over management of most of the property to the state's Department of Environmental Conservation (DEC), which was better equipped for the task, it still faced the problem of what to do with the land.

The region's needs had changed. With IBM and other large industrial concerns cutting workers and closing plants, and people leaving, a large swath of buildable land with few environmental problems was seen by many in the local business community as a goose's golden egg. It couldn't be a sprawling airport, but it could be something else, they thought.

But those people who remained or moved up from more crowded areas to the south had begun to enjoy the outdoor recreation possibilities the lands, referred to variously as the Stewart Properties or the buffer, offered. Mountain bikers, horses, dirt bikers, ATVers, and hikers had all begun to explore and create trails, and DEC's management opened up the area as a popular spot for local hunters and anglers. DEC had also released captured beavers on the properties, who built dams and created new wetlands.

One local hunter, Ben Kissam, formed the Stewart Park and Reserve Coalition (SPARC) in 1987 to oppose efforts to develop the lands. They and other environmentalists and conservationists argued that the whole area would be better off left as a park, pointing to the growing diversity of species on the lands and the state's original promise not to redevelop the area. They were joined, too, by some area residents who said that the existing air traffic, particularly the military C-5s, was noisy enough as it was.

Also generating a lot of noise was the continuing debate in Orange County about what to do with the land, with participants' choice of words ("buffer" vs. "properties") suggesting where they stood. Interpretations differed as to just how much of the land was really meant to serve as a buffer.

The administration of Mario Cuomo tried several times to come up with a plan that would balance these interests, but failed. As one of its last acts, it started a renovation of the passenger terminal using a federal grant.

SWF had occasionally had scheduled air-taxi service, but in April 1990 American Airlines arrived with three Boeing 727-200 nonstops a day to Chicago and three more to its new hub in Raleigh–Durham. Nonstop flights to Dallas Fort/Worth were later added as well. Jet nonstops to Atlanta (Delta) and Pittsburgh (USAir) appeared in the next couple of years; Delta later added Cincinnati, and USAir tried Baltimore.

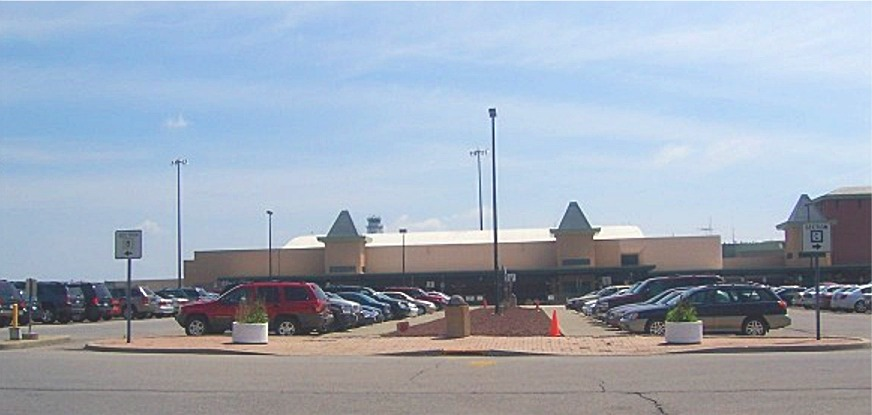
Stewart passenger terminal

==== Privatization ====
In 1994, George Pataki campaigned on improving efficiencies by privatizing money-losing state projects. Ronald Lauder, who had written a book about European successes in privatizations, suggested Stewart be privatized. Pataki created the New York State Council on Privatization and appointed Lauder its chair.

Federal law at the time required that all airports providing passenger service had to be owned by some public entity. With much support from the New York delegation, the United States Congress eventually passed legislation allowing five airports to be privatized as a pilot program, providing certain conditions such as approval by the Federal Aviation Administration (FAA) and by the carriers representing at least two-thirds of the airport's flights.

In 1997, the state formally began, through the Empire State Development Corporation (ESDC), the process of soliciting bids for a 99-year lease on the airport and, potentially, the adjacent undeveloped lands as well, whatever bidders wanted. Efforts by SPARC, now headed by Kissam's widow Sandra, and other citizen activists to find out about who might be bidding and what they planned to do with Stewart were blocked by the state's invocation of a clause in its State Finance Law prohibiting disclosure of competitive bids prior to the award of the contract, an interpretation that survived a court challenge.

Two years later, after approval by the state's attorney general and comptroller as well as the FAA and the carriers, the contract was awarded to the UK-based National Express Group PLC, the only one of five bidders to have declined to present at a special forum organized a week prior to award, and also a company Lauder had praised in his book for its success with the UK's national bus service and subsequent acquisition of East Midlands Airport. This led to some suspicions that the state had always intended to give it the airport from the beginning. NEG (National Express Group) was prepared to pay $35 million for the lease, and after working out the details Pataki handed over a ceremonial key at the passenger terminal in late 2000.

The award also ended, for the most part, the controversy over whether to develop the properties or not. NEG was uninterested in the lands west of Drury Lane, and Pataki announced with the privatization deal that he was directing that ownership as well as management of 5,600 acres (22.4 km^{2}) of the lands west of an envelope DOT retained around Drury for possible future development or disposal be transferred directly to DEC, which has since made that portion Stewart State Forest.

Stewart was one of the many regional airports to be used during the Emergency Ground Stop after the September 11th Attacks, taking in dozens of planes forced to land.

==== The Drury Lane exit ====
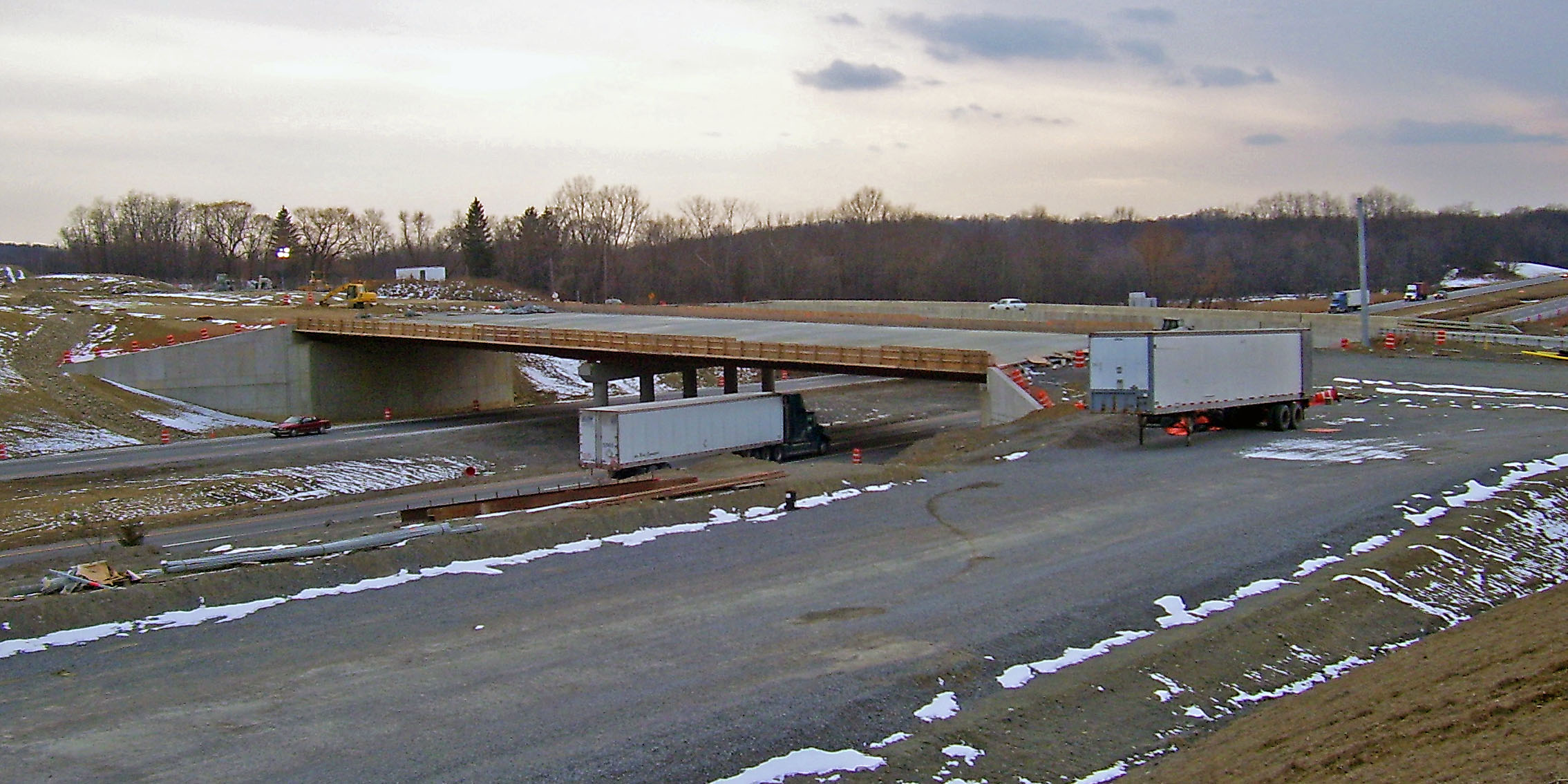
The Drury Lane exit under construction. The original overpass was replaced with a new, wider one.

Simultaneously with the privatization, the state proceeded with long-held plans to build a new interchange on Interstate 84 at Drury Lane, which would also be widened. A four-lane east–west access road, International Boulevard, would also be created to better solve the airport's longstanding access problems (see below). Conveniently, the initial price tag, $35 million, was exactly the amount bid by National Express. The new exit, designated 5A, was opened in the fourth quarter of 2007. The new north–south route is now designated Route 747.

Another complication emerged due to the proximity of the Catskill Aqueduct of New York City's water supply system to the exit; a proposed widening of Drury between the interstate and Route 17K would have required that a bridge be built over the aqueduct to protect it from the vibrations associated with heavy trucks, adding to the cost of the whole project. An alternative emerged during a value-engineering study of simply rerouting Drury Lane to create another four-way intersection farther down 17K, which was ultimately done. Whether the properties along Drury lane could even be developed in any measure remains to be seen, as a good portion of that parcel is either wetlands or a 45-acre (18 ha) trapezoid-shaped Runway Protection Zone in which the FAA mandates that nothing be built – and the remainder is land considered by conservationists to be the best land in the properties. SPARC, the Orange County Federation of Sportsmen's Clubs and the national Sierra Club filed a lawsuit in federal court alleging that required environmental reviews were not done or done improperly; that action tied up the exit's construction for a while. In March 2005, an area slated for wetlands mitigation under the plans was found to harbor purple milkweed, a Species of Special Concern on the National Heritage Program's rare plant list. SPARC and its co-plaintiffs sought an injunction against further action such as the consideration of bids, yet that went ahead anyway.

The controversy was settled by a deal announced on November 21 of that year. SPARC accepted a compromise where, in exchange for the construction of the exit and access road, 1,700 acres (6.8 km^{2}) of the remaining buffer lands would be added to the forest and restrictions would be imposed on development of the remaining 400 acres (1.6 km^{2}) in the northeast corner of the properties, near the exit.

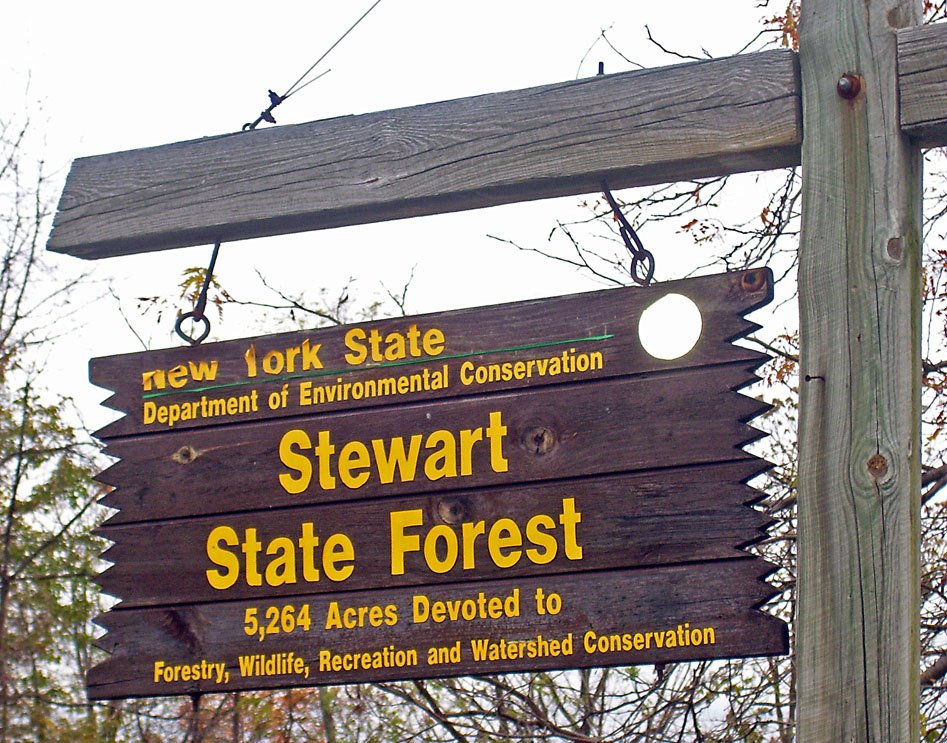
NYSDEC Stewart State Forest sign at parking area on Route 207

In July 2006, the state formally transferred ownership of the state forest from DOT to DEC, ending the process of creating Stewart State Forest. Orange County was not thrilled with the state's decision to charge it $3.7 million for the area near the exit, saying that it was too much on top of the costs it would incur putting in infrastructure. DOT said it was just asking fair market value for the land.

==== NEG Management ====
NEG's marketing initiatives included several proposed new names for the airport to emphasize its proximity to the city. The last one, in 2006, which would have dropped the "Stewart" name entirely, met with local opposition and was ultimately dropped.

Stewart has a limited selection of flights available and is relatively uncrowded most of the day. Some tenants have moved into nearby former military buildings, but most remain as unoccupied as they were the day the base was closed. It has drawn some passengers from western Connecticut who might otherwise have flown out of Hartford. But most of the fliers within Stewart's catchment area have continued to prefer Albany International Airport, Newark or other metropolitan airports.

Delta pulled out of the airport shortly after the privatization announcement, ostensibly to better serve new routes it had won to Latin America, leaving it to codeshare partners Comair and ASA. Even one of the "tourist draws" for the airport evaporated in 2003 when the Concorde was retired. Its pilots had sometimes used the lengthy runway to practice touch-and-go landings.

NEG's dealings with the state were not as harmonious as they were initially represented to be; documents made public by SPARC after the privatization was completed showed that there were many lingering issues between the two parties even at that time and that NEG had in fact considered breaking the deal at one point (as it would later ultimately do). The company has gone through some local management shuffles as well, and the parent corporation's sale of East Midlands, considered the example it would follow with Stewart, was a cause for concern in the region.

While some local officials expressed disappointment, others saw NEG as getting out of the airport business entirely to concentrate on its core business in the bus and rail sectors. They hoped at first that another European company with experience running privatized airports would be interested, and industry analysts said the timing was good. Governor Eliot Spitzer promised area leaders that Stewart would be a top priority for his administration, and the Port Authority of New York and New Jersey, which runs the New York area's three main airports, expressed interest in assuming NEG's obligations. Allegiant Air pulled out of Stewart in early 2007 but later returned and as of 2024 serves the airport. Both AirTran Airways and JetBlue announced plans for service from Stewart in 2007. AirTran, which had previously served Newburgh in 1995, was subsequently acquired by and merged into Southwest Airlines, which currently does not serve the airport.

In 2005, the airport was used to transport emergency personnel and supplies to help the cleanup after the destruction of Hurricane Katrina, which devastated the Gulf Coast.

==== Port Authority takeover and end of privatization ====
On January 25, 2007, the Port Authority voted to buy the lease for Stewart. It took over operating control on November 1, 2007, after New Jersey's acting governor, Richard Codey, signed a bill the New Jersey Legislature had to pass, changing the law to allow the move. PANYNJ will pay NEG $78.5 million for the remaining 93 years on its lease. The day after the takeover, an opening ceremony was held in which New York State Governor Eliot Spitzer attended and the Port Authority flag was raised. It has set aside $500 million in its ten-year capital improvement plan to expand the airport.

The Port Authority sees Stewart as offering relief to those airports and (especially) Teterboro, estimating it could handle five times its present passenger volume. It will probably follow its standard procedure and contract the actual operations of the airport out.

Although 2006's bad numbers may have led NEG to pull out, Stewart's commercial service seemed to be on the rise. Shortly after taking over, PANYNJ reported that the airport's traffic for 2007 would be triple that of 2006. It was reported in January 2008 that Stewart had achieved its goal and had handled 970,000 passengers in 2007.

A 2007 plan envisioned changing Stewart's image over the next 20 years. Major renovations such as a new terminal, a train station next to the new terminal connecting the airport to Metro North via a new spur from the Port Jervis Line, a 2,000-foot (610 m) extension of runway 16–34, new taxiways, and a major expansion of the cargo facilities occurred. A new control tower has been built. In the fourth quarter of 2007, Interstate 84's new Drury Lane exit, NY Route 747, and International Boulevard opened.

In addition to commercial and passenger services, Stewart excels in many other areas not seen by the public. NEG had some success selling private helicopter shuttle service to midtown Manhattan's heliports to business travelers from Stewart at rates competitive with those offered from JFK Airport; it also remains a popular place to service corporate jets due to the large space available.

Cargo services are also part of the mix – FedEx maintains a large distribution presence just outside the airport, as does the U.S. Postal Service, whose main general-mail facility for the mid-Hudson region is not far away. Importers of plant and animal products also route their flights to Stewart and the USDA inspection facility for those is nearby, on Drury Lane.

With its long runway, Stewart bills itself as an "efficient diversion airport" for aircraft intending to land at one of the three major New York City airports (Newark, LaGuardia, and JFK), especially during bad weather. The largest such diversion occurred during the January 2018 blizzard, when a Singapore Airlines Airbus A380 on a Frankfurt-JFK flight diverted to Stewart after JFK closed. While the airport's runways are sufficiently long to allow such a large aircraft to land and take off, the plane was so large it could not use any of the terminal building's gates. Passengers had to leave the plane using stairs, and were transported to New York City by bus.

American Airlines, which had served Stewart since 1990, ended American Eagle regional jet service to Chicago O'Hare International Airport on September 5, 2007. In 1991, American was operating up to five mainline departures a day nonstop to Chicago O'Hare with Boeing 727-200 jetliners.

In February 2008, the PA's new general manager, Diannae Ehler, said she had been discussing the possibility of foreign flights with a number of European carriers. She felt encouraged and hoped that by 2009 there could be regular passenger service between Stewart and some European destinations. AirTran Airways ended service to the airport that same year.

In September 2010, it was announced that Apple Vacations would begin non-stop charter service to Cancún. Flights are operated by Allegiant Air.

On August 20, 2013, Allegiant Air announced that it would be returning to Stewart with new flights to St. Petersburg/Clearwater after leaving the airport in 2007. Flights began on October 31, 2013.

In May 2015, the Port Authority announced it was considering changing the airport's name to "New York International Airport at Stewart Field". Its stated rationale was to give the airport "global status", to ensure that its name appears higher in Internet searches done by travelers abroad, and in keeping with the business model followed by many low-cost European airlines of flying into less busy airports further from the cities they serve in order to keep expenses down. Many local residents were cool to the idea, since the Stewart family name has a long history with the airport and the PA had promised it would never change the name when it took over.

On December 5, 2016, General Manager Edmond Harrison announced that Norwegian Air Shuttle planned to set up a base at Stewart for flights to Europe using its Irish subsidiary. The destinations out of Stewart were Belfast–International, Bergen, Dublin, Edinburgh and Shannon. The first international flight departed for Edinburgh on June 15, 2017. On September 14, 2019, Norwegian Air Shuttle ended service.

By 2020, American Eagle had reduced service to one daily flight to Philadelphia. This flight was suspended on October 7, 2020, was resumed on January 5, 2021, and then ended for a final time on September 30, 2021.

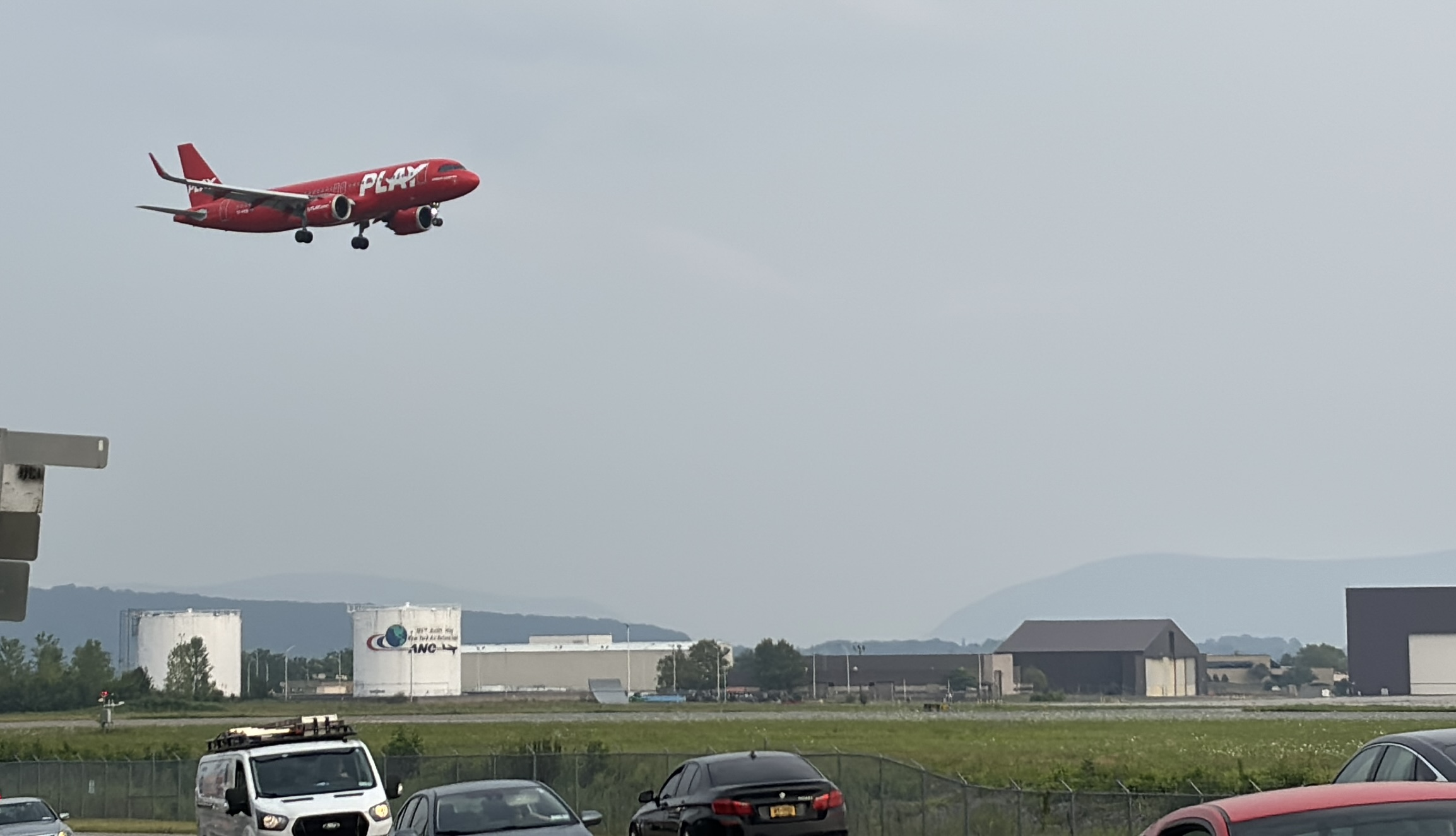
Play flight OG121 approaching SWF on August 5, 2025

On June 9, 2022, Icelandic airline Play began a daily service to Keflavik with connections to other European destinations. Play ended service to Stewart on September 1, 2025.

On May 12, 2023, Frontier Airlines announced that their Stewart to Orlando flights would be cut after July 2, 2023, meaning that their presence in the airport would be coming to an end after less than 2 years. Between October 2021 and July 2, 2023, Frontier had commenced and ended flights to Atlanta, Miami, Orlando, Raleigh, and Tampa from SWF. This left Allegiant Air as the only airline in Stewart with domestic destinations.

On November 8, 2023, Breeze Airways announced year-round, twice-weekly service to Orlando, FL beginning February 15, 2024, and seasonal, twice-weekly service to Charleston, SC beginning May 10, 2024.

On September 17, 2024, Atlantic Airways discontinued service to Stewart.

On September 1, 2025, Play operated its final flight between Iceland and Stewart International Airport. The airline had planned to withdraw from the United States market; however, it filed for bankruptcy and ceased all operations prior to the completion of this withdrawal.

On January 3, 2026, Venezuelan president Nicolás Maduro and his wife were captured in a ground operation as part of the 2025-2026 U.S. military actions against Venezuela, and after being flown out of Venezuela and transported around the region on U.S. military transport, flown to Stewart International Airport, where he initially arrived in the United States around 5 p.m. under escort on an FBI aircraft, arriving at the Stewart Air National Guard Base located within the airport and on its property. He was later transported via helicopter to New York City for processing and transfer to the Metropolitan Detention Center for detention while awaiting trial on U.S. federal charges.

== Facilities and operations ==
New York Stewart International Airport covers 1,552 acres (628 ha) at an elevation of 491 feet (150 m) above mean sea level. It has two asphalt runways and one helipad.

The east–west runway 9–27 is 11,817 feet (3,602 m) long by 150 feet (46 m) wide, but the landing threshold at each end is displaced 2,000 feet (610 m). Aircraft landing to the east have a landing distance available restriction, an additional 1,000-foot (300 m) reduction in length, making only 8,817 feet (2,687 m) usable for landing. Runway 27 has 9,817 feet (2,992 m) available for landing. The full length is available for takeoff in both directions. Runway 9 has an instrument landing system for category I and category II approaches and an ALSF2 approach lighting system. Runway 27 got an instrument landing system in recent years, but without any approach lighting, landing minimums for this runway are higher.

The crosswind runway 16–34 is 6,004 feet (1,830 m) long by 150 feet (46 m) wide and each end has GPS-based instrument approaches.

The helipad, H1, is asphalt, 40 by 40 feet (12 x 12 m).

=== Law enforcement ===
Law enforcement at Stewart International Airport is the responsibility primarily of the Port Authority of New York and New Jersey Police Department. In addition to normal uniformed patrol of terminals, concourses, and parking lots, the PAPD provides anti-crime plainclothes units, criminal investigative detective squads, counter-terrorism units, high-value cargo escorts and patrols, dignitary protection, marine patrol of surrounding waters, passenger screening point protection and security, Aircraft Rescue Fire Fighting and community outreach.

The PAPD operates alongside partner agencies, including the Transportation Security Administration (TSA) and the New York State Police.

== Airlines and destinations ==
=== Passenger ===
Airlines	Destinations
Allegiant Air	Fort Lauderdale, Myrtle Beach, Orlando/Sanford, Punta Gorda (FL), St. Petersburg/Clearwater
Breeze Airways	Charleston (SC), Myrtle Beach (begins May 28, 2027), Orlando, Raleigh/Durham; Seasonal: Fort Myers

Passenger destinations map
Domestic destinations from Stewart International Airport
Red = Year-round destination
Green = Seasonal destination

=== Cargo ===
Stewart Airport serves as a regional cargo hub for FedEx Express, operating daily flights to several domestic destinations.

== Statistics ==
For the 12-month period ending April 30, 2023, the airport had 37,133 aircraft operations, an average of 102 per day: 63% general aviation, 9% air taxi, 17% military, and 11% scheduled commercial. In April 2023, 54 aircraft were then based at this airport: 30 jet, 3 multi-engine, 9 military, 6 single-engine, and 6 helicopter.

Federal Aviation Administration records say the airport had 392,464 passenger boardings (enplanements) in calendar year 2008, 197,655 in 2009 and 201,684 in 2010.

=== Top destinations ===
Busiest domestic routes from SWF (May 2025 – April 2026)
Rank	City	Passengers	Carriers
1	Myrtle Beach, South Carolina	24,090	Allegiant
2	St. Petersburg, Florida	19,110	Allegiant
3	Punta Gorda, Florida	17,030	Allegiant
4	Orlando–International, Florida	14,920	Breeze
5	Fort Lauderdale, Florida	14,300	Allegiant
6	Orlando–Sanford, Florida	12,370	Allegiant
7	Charleston, South Carolina	11,070	Breeze
8	Vero Beach, Florida	730	Breeze

Airline market shares (May 2025 – April 2026)
Rank	Airline	Passengers	Market share
1	Allegiant	173,000	77.30%
2	Breeze	50,910	22.70%

=== Annual traffic ===
Annual passenger traffic at SWF, 1994-2024
Year	Passengers	Year	Passengers	Year	Passengers	Year	Passengers
1994	694,646	2004	510,563	2014	309,357	2024	140,000
1995	713,942	2005	398,220	2015	281,754	2025	237,000
1996	730,032	2006	309,921	2016	275,421		
1997	719,194	2007	913,927	2017	448,323		
1998	518,447	2008	789,307	2018	690,411		
1999	362,479	2009	390,065	2019	525,715		
2000	402,647	2010	394,902	2020	97,392		
2001	284,085	2011	413,654	2021	133,000		
2002	227,834	2012	364,848	2022	244,000		
2003	400,839	2013	320,682	2023	152,000		

== Ground transportation ==
One of the biggest impediments to the use of Stewart by more airlines and passengers has been getting to it. The Drury Lane exit and the access road, International Boulevard, are intended to remedy this.

There have been plans to possibly implement a light rail connection along Broadway in Newburgh that could conceivably go out to Stewart from the now discontinued ferry connection with the Metro-North passenger line across the Hudson River in Beacon. This project does not appear likely to happen any time soon. As of 2024, the only connection is via a shuttle bus.

In 2006, with construction of the Drury Lane exit underway, Senator Charles Schumer put his weight behind getting federal aid for another long-discussed access improvement: a rail link to the nearby Metro-North Port Jervis Line, to give passengers an express train trip from the airport into the city or Newark Airport via Secaucus Junction. This would entail acquiring property and laying new tracks, to link to the existing line somewhere near the Salisbury Mills station. NEG had had success with the similar Gatwick Express and Midland Mainline rail-air connections in its native Britain. While the federal government has approved the idea, the money has not yet been appropriated.

=== Bus transportation ===
Bus connections
Operators	Routes	Notes	Refs
Coach USA	Stewart Airport Express	Express bus to Port Authority Bus Terminal	
Leprechaun Lines	Newburgh, Beacon, Stewart Shuttle	Shuttle to Beacon station (Metro-North Railroad)	

Starting in June 2017, to support Norwegian's growth in making the airport a terminal for visitors to New York City, Coach USA began providing a bus service between the airport and the Port Authority Bus Terminal in Manhattan. This service operates under the name "Stewart Airport Express."

== Accidents and incidents ==
- On the morning of August 20, 1987, an Emery Worldwide (operated by Rosenbalm Aviation as Flight 74) Douglas DC-8-63 collided with Airborne Express Flight 124, operated by a McDonnell Douglas DC-9-31, on Runway 09/27 in fog. The Emery airplane landed without first receiving clearance while the Airborne Express plane, which had landed just prior to the DC-8, was taxiing on the runway. Both aircraft were repaired and returned to service.
- In the early-morning hours of September 5, 1996, the pilots of Federal Express Flight 1406, a McDonnell Douglas DC-10-10 from Memphis to Boston reported smoke in the cargo compartment and made an emergency landing at Stewart to fight the fire. All five crewmembers escaped with only minor injuries but, despite a prompt effort by the firefighting teams from the ANG base (which also handle the civilian airport's fire protection needs) the fire completely consumed the aircraft. Two years later, the National Transportation Safety Board (NTSB) traced the source of the fire to an area where some flammables had been stored but could not pin down exactly which had combusted, and faulted the captain for failing to get full information on potentially hazardous materials being shipped.
- Early on the morning of November 21, 2007, a single-engine Cirrus piloted by Brian Early of Wayne, Pennsylvania, got lost in the fog on its approach and crashed in the state forest. He had been dropping off his two passengers, a son and one of his friends, to visit friends of theirs at West Point for Thanksgiving. It took rescuers three hours to find the wreckage using the plane's transponder. Early was killed but the younger men survived.
- A small aerobatic plane crashed at the airport August 28, 2015, killing the pilot, who was practicing stunts at Stewart for the two-day New York Air Show that was to be held there starting the following day. The two-seater single-engine fixed-wing Giles G-202, a homebuilt aircraft, assembled from a kit, was completing dramatic climbs and dives as a crowd of mostly journalists watched below. Around 2 p.m., as the pilot went into a dive followed by a steep corkscrew climb, part of the tail appeared to break off, witnesses said and photographs indicated. The plane then crossed the crowd line and spun over the heads of spectators, crashing in a wooded area behind the crowd. The pilot, the plane's only occupant, was identified as the plane's owner, Andrew Wright of Austin, Texas. The National Transportation Safety Board and the New York State Police were to investigate to determine the crash's probable cause, the state police and Federal Aviation Administration said. The NTSB determined that the resin bond between two parts had failed under stress after repeated aileron rolls. Examination of the bond between the horizontal stabilizer and the flange that attached it to the left side of the fuselage revealed that a portion had a poor bond, with the resin inadequately transferring between the two surfaces. The accident was compared to a similar event in France on the same type of aircraft. As a result of these accidents, the Giles' designer specified several new procedures for aircraft flight handling and inspection.
- On August 21, 2018, a Gulfstream IV carrying musician Post Malone and 15 other people made a successful precautionary landing after two main tires blew during takeoff from Teterboro Airport. After circling Teterboro for nearly an hour, in hopes of making an emergency landing, the plane was diverted to Westfield-Barnes Regional Airport in western Massachusetts where it once again circled the airspace, burning fuel before its descent attempt in order to lighten the plane's weight. Once again, the plane was diverted to Stewart International Airport due to Stewart being equipped with longer runways, meaning pilots would not need to engage reverse thrusters or spoilers, thereby lessening the weight on the landing gear and the plane's remaining tires. Ultimately, the plane landed on Runway 9, which is nearly double the length of the longest runway at Teterboro Airport.

== See also ==
- Aviation in the New York metropolitan area
- List of airports in New York (disambiguation)
