= Total Linhas Aéreas Flight 5682 =

2024 aviation accident in Brazil

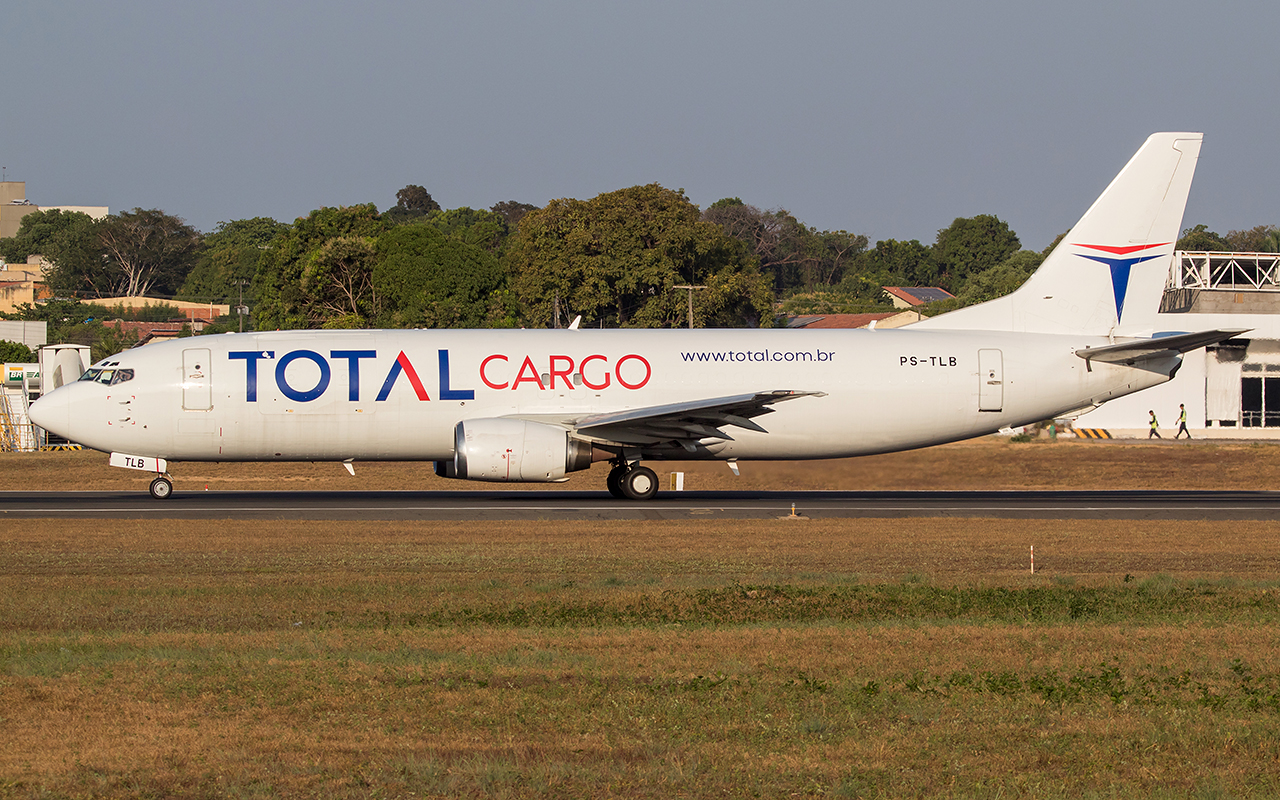
- PS-TLB, the aircraft involved in the accident, seen in August 2024

Accident
- Date: November 9, 2024
- Summary: In-flight fire, under investigation
- Site: São Paulo/Guarulhos International Airport, São Paulo, Brazil; 23°26′7″S 46°28′30″W

Aircraft
- Aircraft type: Boeing 737-4Q8 (SF)
- Operator: Total Linhas Aéreas
- IATA flight No.: 0T5682
- ICAO flight No.: TTL5682
- Call sign: TOTAL 5682
- Registration: PS-TLB
- Flight origin: Eurico de Aguiar Salles Airport, Vitória, Espírito Santo, Brazil
- Destination: São Paulo/Guarulhos International Airport, Guarulhos, São Paulo, Brazil
- Occupants: 2
- Crew: 2
- Fatalities: 0
- Survivors: 2

Total Linhas Aéreas Flight 5682 was a domestic Brazilian cargo flight from Eurico de Aguiar Salles Airport to São Paulo/Guarulhos International Airport that suffered an in-flight fire on November 9, 2024. The Boeing 737-400 aircraft made an emergency landing at its destination, where the two crew members onboard evacuated with no significant injuries, while the plane was destroyed by the fire and written off.

== Aircraft ==
The aircraft involved, manufactured in 1994, was a Boeing 737-4Q8 (SF), cargo variant of the Boeing 737-400. It was registered as PS-TLB with serial number 26299. The aircraft was initially delivered to Turkish Airlines on April 19, 1994. In April 2000, the aircraft was delivered to Asiana Airlines. In May 2024, it was transferred to Total Linhas Aéreas. It was equipped with two CFM International CFM56-3 engines.

== Accident ==
The aircraft took off from Eurico de Aguiar Salles Airport at around 23:34 local time, and the flight was uneventful. While on approach, the cargo hold fire alarm was triggered. The crew of the aircraft declared an emergency and decided to continue to its destination. At around 00:37 radio contact with the aircraft was lost, though the transponder continued to work as normal. At 00:42 local time the plane landed on runway 28L at São Paulo/Guarulhos International Airport, by then the ATC tower could already see smoke and flames emitting from the aircraft. The two crew members onboard turned off the engines, then evacuated from the cockpit windows. In an attempt to avoid the fire spreading, the door that connected the cockpit with the cabin was not used. The plane burned on the runway, and after the fire was extinguished large holes could be seen on the top and on the sides of the fuselage. According to Correios, 20% of the cargo being transported was destroyed by the fire, while the remaining cargo was removed by the firefighters. The airport's firefighting vehicles and five external vehicles intervened to put out the flames by 07:30 local and the wreckage of the charred aircraft was removed from the runway around 09:10 local time. The runway then re-opened at around 12:30 local time.

== Aftermath ==
Later that day, Total Linhas Aereas released a statement about the accident in which they confirmed the reports, and thanked the emergency response teams that helped with the accident, the company also stated that they will publish new information as soon as they can. On 4 June, 2025, CENIPA temporarily suspended cargo flight operations on behalf of Correios, due to safety concerns regarding the management of hazardous materials raised by the accident of Flight 5682. The postal company and the airline accused each other of the mismanagement. In September of 2026 ANAC, the brazilian civil aviation authorities, is weighting to suspend Total Linhas Aereas' operation certificate. Among the reasons cited for the possible suspension is the non-adherence to national norms on the handling and transportation of hazardous materials, including lithium batteries. The accident of Flight 5682, where a lithium battery fire is suspected, is cited as one of the main causes of concern.

In November 2025, a year after the accident, the remains of the plane started to be broken up and reused for spare parts.

== Investigation ==
The CENIPA agency is investigating on the accident. On November 18, 2024, the Brazilian Aeronautical Accidents Investigation and Prevention Center (CENIPA) released a preliminary report on the accident which confirmed what was known so far about the aircraft and the fire. Currently the most accredited theory is that the fire originated from lithium batteries stored in the cargo.

== See also ==
- FedEx Express Flight 1406
- UPS Airlines Flight 6
- Asiana Airlines Cargo Flight 991
- In-flight fire
