= Total Linhas Aéreas Flight 5561 =

2002 aviation accident

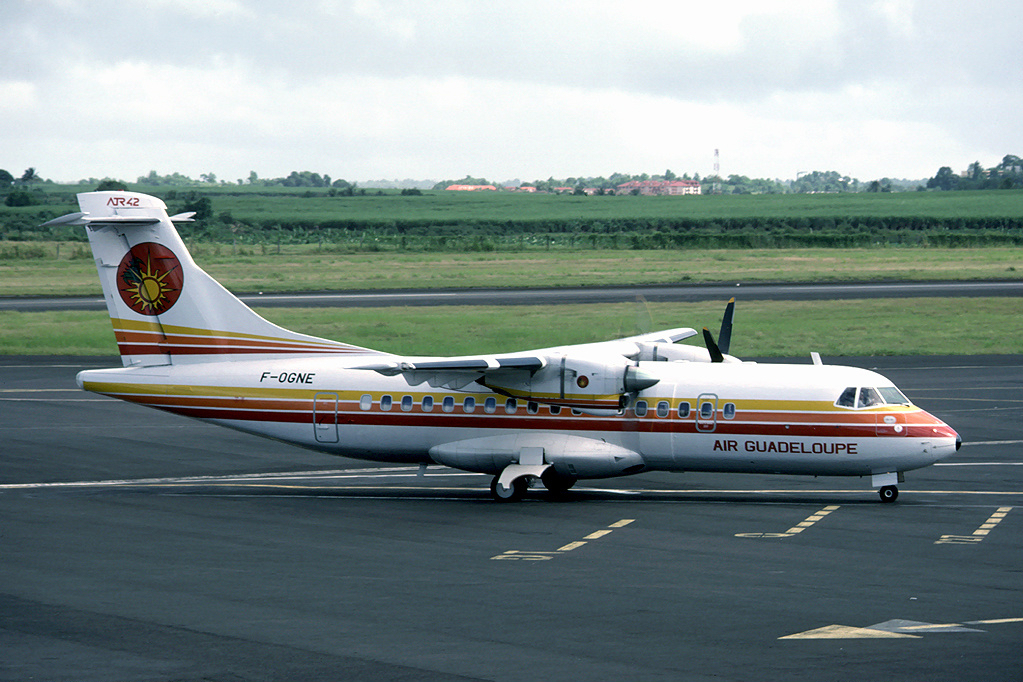
- PT-MTS, the ATR 42-300 involved, in service with Air Guadeloupe, 1986.

Accident
- Date: September 14, 2002
- Summary: Loss of control
- Site: 38 km (24 mi; 21 nmi) SW Of Paranapanema

Aircraft
- Aircraft type: ATR 42-312
- Operator: Total Linhas Aéreas
- IATA flight No.: L15561
- ICAO flight No.: TTL5561
- Call sign: TOTAL 5561
- Registration: PT-MTS
- Flight origin: São Paulo/Guarulhos International Airport, São Paulo, Brazil
- Destination: Londrina Airport, Londrina, Brazil
- Occupants: 2
- Crew: 2
- Fatalities: 2
- Survivors: 0

Total Linhas Aéreas Flight 5561 was a domestic cargo flight from São Paulo, Brazil to Londrina, Brazil that crashed near Paranapanema 47 minutes after takeoff on 14 September 2002. The crew of the ATR 42 regional turboprop lost control of the aircraft's pitch and were both killed in the accident.

The accident was investigated by the Brazilian Air Force's Aeronautical Accidents Investigation and Prevention Center (Portuguese: Centro de Investigação e Prevenção de Acidentes Aeronáuticos (CENIPA)), with a final report issued in March 2007. Investigators concluded that the most likely cause of the accident was a pitch trim control system failure.

== Accident ==
The flight took off from São Paulo at 04:52 local time and at 05:12:30 the crew asked for permission to climb to flight level (FL) 160 i.e. 16,000 feet (4,877 m). At 05:13:18 the co-pilot commented "Damn, it's the wiring harness." The meaning of this statement remains undetermined. At 05:16:03 the aircraft was cleared to climb to FL180 (18,000 feet [5,486 m]). At 05:29:14 the pilot informed the co-pilot he was going to change his clothes and removed himself from his cockpit seat. At 05:37:32 the "event" button located on the center console was pushed. Five seconds later the autopilot disengaged and the pitch trim control system began moving the trim tabs to a nose down attitude. As the airliner began descending, at 05:37:38 and 05:37:46 the pilot asked the co-pilot what was happening, and he responded that he did not know. Eight seconds later at 05:37:54 the co-pilot exclaimed that the pitch trim control system was running the trim nose down, then the sound of a seat belt buckling was recorded indicating the pilot had returned to his seat. Between 05:37:40 and 05:37:46 one of the crew members attempted to arrest the descent by pulling back on the control column.

At 05:37:55 the pilot told the co-pilot to "Pull the trim" for the first time, meaning pull the circuit breaker (CB) that powers the pitch trim system. This CB is located in a panel behind the co-pilot and is not reachable by the pilot. The co-pilot did not initially understand the pilot's request and the pilot repeated it several times as the pitch trim continued to trim down, eventually reaching and staying at its full down stop of five degrees. At 05:38:05 the co-pilot stated "I pulled, I pulled" and a CB was deactivated.

Flight 5561 was now at 16,000 feet and descending and had accelerated from its cruising speed of 180 to 260 knots (333 to 482 km/h; 207 to 299 mph). At 05:38:07 the over speed alarm sounded indicating the aircraft had exceeded the maximum operating limit speed (Vmo) and the crew reduced power from the cruise setting to 10%. From 05:38:29 until 05:38:49 the pilot requested of the co-pilot to pull the trim as he continued to pull the control column. The CVR recorded sounds of the aircraft continuing to accelerate, then at 05:39:10 the recording ended. The aircraft collided with the ground in a 30 degrees left bank angle, pitched down approximately 45 degrees at 366 knots (678 km/h; 421 mph). The aircraft was completely destroyed and both crew members perished.

== Aircraft ==
The aircraft was a 16-year-old ATR 42-300 twin turboprop aircraft with two Pratt & Whitney Canada PW120 engines, registered as PT-MTS. The aircraft had accumulated a total of 33,371 hours of flying time and had undergone 22,922 takeoff/landing cycles.

== Investigation ==
On 30 March 2007, CENIPA released its final report on the accidents cause. At take off the aircraft had a gross take-off weight of 16,649 kilograms (36,705 lb) including 4,720 kilograms (10,410 lb) of cargo, 51 kilograms (112 lb) less than the maximum takeoff weight. The center of gravity was within allowable limits and weather was found not to have been a factor in the accident.

Investigators determined from conversation on the cockpit voice recorder (CVR) that the pilot never left the cockpit area, but the fact that he left his seat and that communication between the crew was poor during the accident sequence cost the crew time to search for a solution and may have been a factor in the crash. The crew was not trained for a "runaway trim" scenario and no procedure for dealing with this were found in the manuals written by the aircraft manufacturer. This may have been a factor in the cause of the accident.

The activation of the event button was most likely inadvertent because no abnormalities were found on the FDR and neither pilot mentioned pushing it. The stand by trim switch is located close to the event button and it is possible that it too was activated without the crews knowledge causing the autopilot to disengage. Activation of the stand by trim switch is not one of the parameters recorded by the FDR.

Examination of the ATR 42's history shows several reports of trim control concerns that the Federal Aviation Administration issued Airworthiness Directive(s) (AD) for. An incident in 2001 led the Civil Aviation of France to issue an AD for ATR 42 type aircraft as well.

The investigating bureau stated in part that problems involving system relays, switches, wires and connectors was "considered the most likely to have occurred, giving rise to the firing of the elevator compensator (pitch trim system)". Also stated in the report was that the "systems (pitch trim) normal and reserve (stand by) were not independent and the system had low error tolerance".

== See also ==
- List of accidents and incidents involving commercial aircraft
- Aero Trasporti Italiani Flight 460
- Pakistan International Airlines Flight 661
