= FedEx Express Flight 1406 =

1996 aviation accident

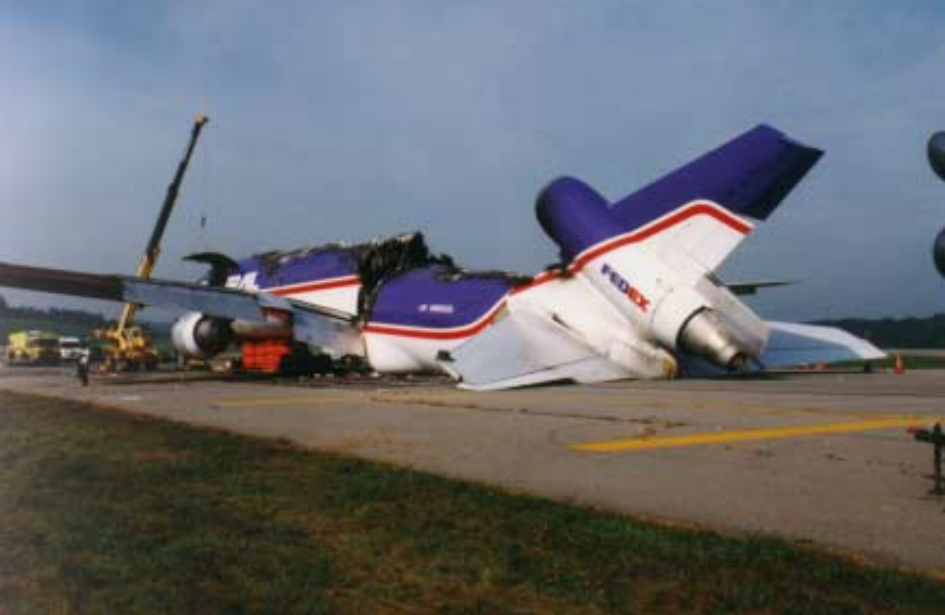
- The aftermath of Flight 1406

Accident
- Date: September 5, 1996
- Summary: In-flight fire of undetermined origin in cargo hold
- Site: Stewart International Airport, Newburgh, New York, United States; 41°30.25′N 74°06.29′W

Aircraft
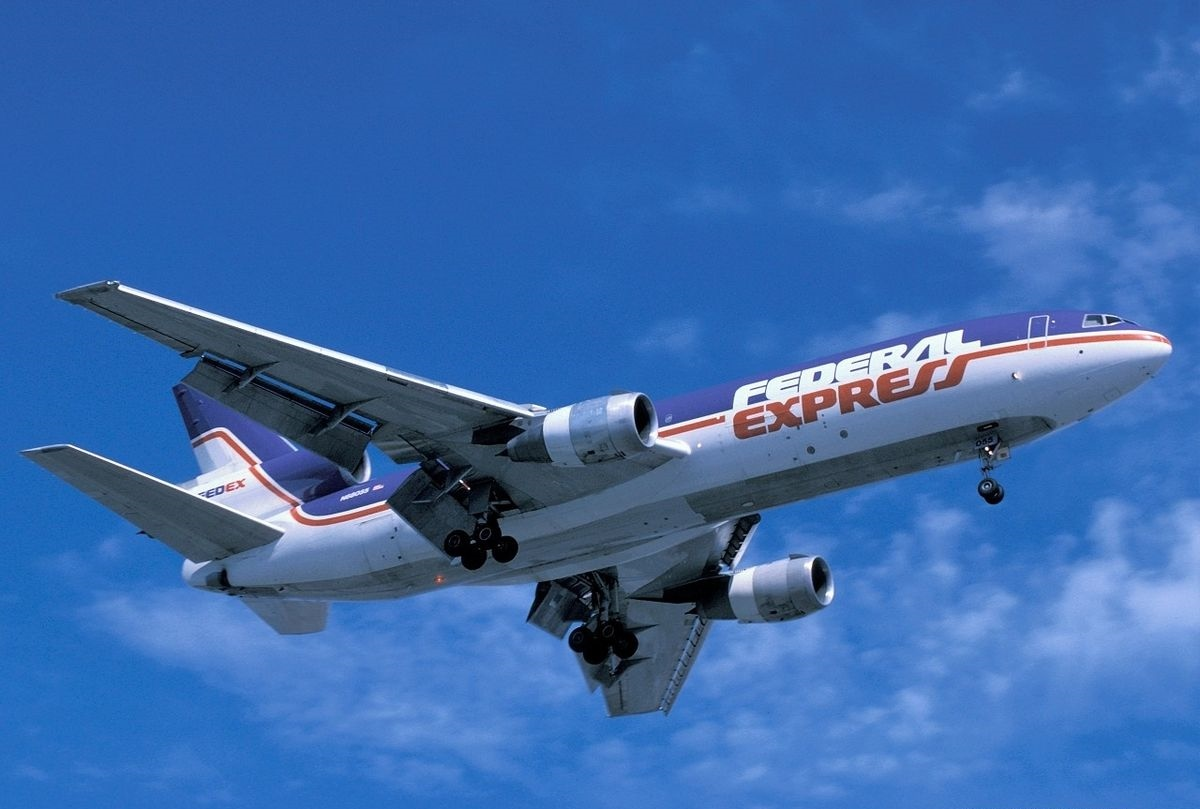
- N68055, the aircraft involved in the accident, seen in April 1996
- Aircraft type: McDonnell Douglas DC-10-10CF
- Aircraft name: Chandra Renee
- Operator: FedEx Express
- IATA flight No.: FX1406
- ICAO flight No.: FDX1406
- Call sign: FEDEX 1406
- Registration: N68055
- Flight origin: Memphis International Airport, Memphis, Tennessee, United States
- Destination: Logan International Airport, Boston, Massachusetts, United States
- Occupants: 5
- Passengers: 2
- Crew: 3
- Fatalities: 0
- Injuries: 2
- Survivors: 5

FedEx Express Flight 1406 was an American domestic cargo flight from Memphis International Airport, Memphis, Tennessee, to Logan International Airport in Boston, Massachusetts, that suffered an in-flight cargo fire over New York on September 5, 1996. The three crew members and two passengers on board successfully evacuated after an emergency landing at Stewart International Airport in Newburgh, New York. After the evacuation, the McDonnell Douglas DC-10 was consumed by fire. After an extensive investigation, the National Transportation Safety Board (NTSB) could not determine what caused the fire. Nevertheless, the Federal Aviation Administration (FAA) made recommendations to prevent similar incidents from occurring in the future.

== Background ==
=== Aircraft ===
The aircraft involved, manufactured in 1975, was a McDonnell Douglas DC-10-10CF registered as N68055 with serial number 37809. The aircraft name was Chandra Renee. It had logged onto more than 38271 airframe hours and 17818 take-off and landing cycles and was equipped with three General Electric CF6-6D engines.

=== Crew ===
There were three crew members and two passengers on Flight 1406. The Captain (47), had 12,344 flight hours, 2,504 of which were logged on the DC-10; the First Officer (41), had 6,535 flight hours, 1,338 of which were logged on the DC-10; and the Flight Engineer (45) had 3,704 flight hours, 188 of which were logged on the DC-10. Also on board were two FedEx employees (including Vietnam veteran and Eastern Air Lines pilot Frederick S. Olmsted Jr.) sitting in jumpseats.

== Flight ==
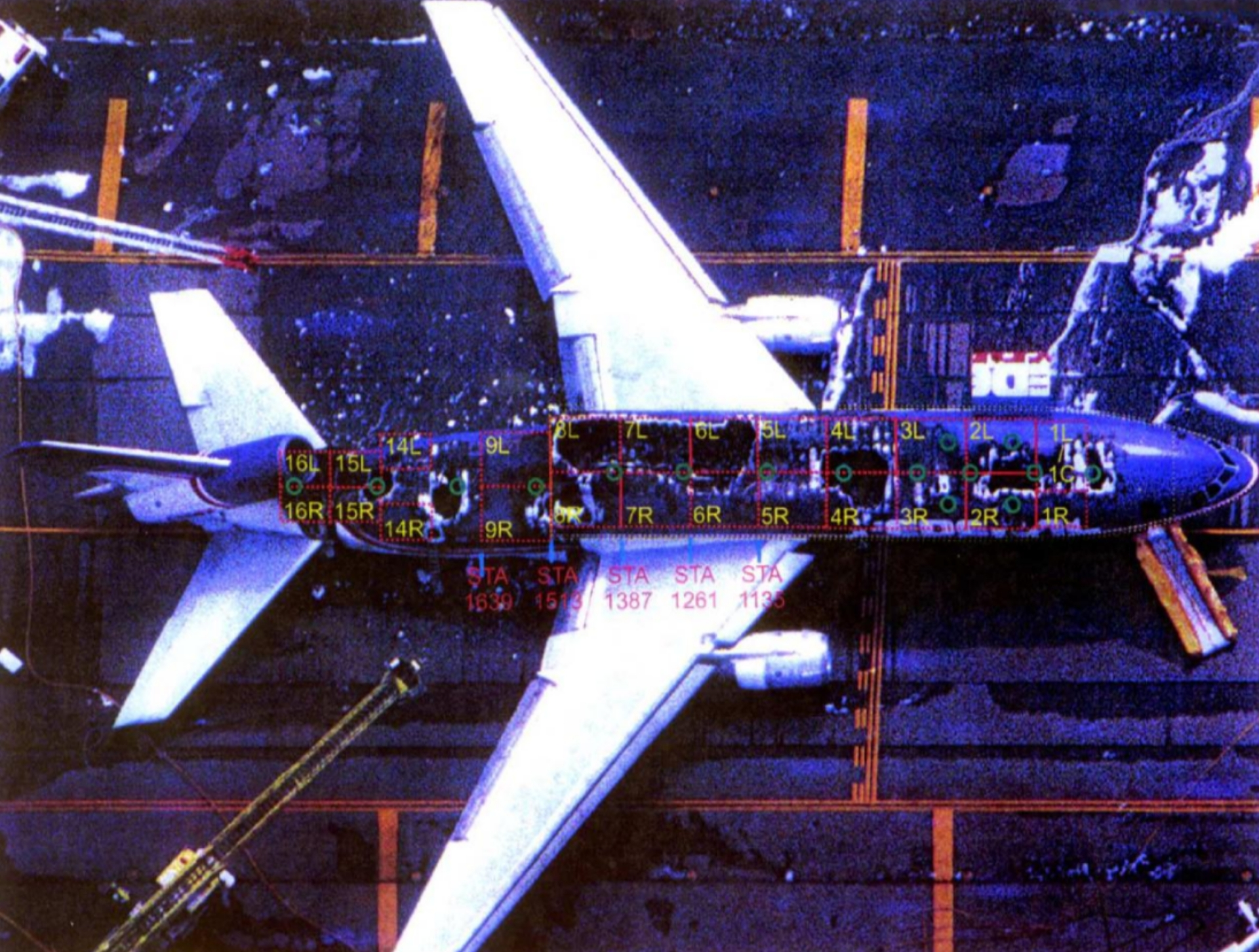
N68055, after the fire

Flight 1406 departed from Memphis International Airport at 3:42 am, en route to Logan International Airport, Boston, Massachusetts, with an estimated time of arrival (ETA) of 7:42 am.

At 5:42 am, Flight 1406 was cruising at 33,000 ft (10,000 m) above the state of New York when the Cabin Smoke Fire Alarm sounded in the cockpit. Smoke detectors for several zones of the aircraft's main deck cargo compartment alerted the pilots of suspected smoke, prompting the crew members and passengers to don their smoke masks. Aircraft systems began to fail, and the crew noticed smoke entering the cockpit. The crew informed Boston Air Traffic Control (ATC) about the fire situation; ATC suggested that Flight 1406 could make an emergency landing at Albany County Airport, 50 mi (80 km) ahead, or to land at Stewart International Airport in Newburgh, 25 mi (40 km) behind. The crew decided to land at Stewart.

At 5:49 am, the aircraft was on approach to Stewart International Airport, where airport fire services prepared for the DC-10 to land on Runway 27. The aircraft successfully landed at the airport at 5:54 am and turned onto a taxiway, where it came to a stop for the fire services to engage. The crew and the employees tried to evacuate the aircraft, but the doors and cockpit windows could not be opened because the fuselage was still pressurized. The captain then de-pressurized the aircraft and all occupants then exited safely; the flight crew through a cockpit window and the passengers through one of the forward fuselage cabin doors. The fire crews found the cargo prevented them from accessing the source of the smoke from inside the cabin and forty minutes after the aircraft landed the fire burned through the fuselage skin; the fire was extinguished four hours after the aircraft landed. All five people on board survived, though two members of the flight crew received minor injuries.

== Investigation ==
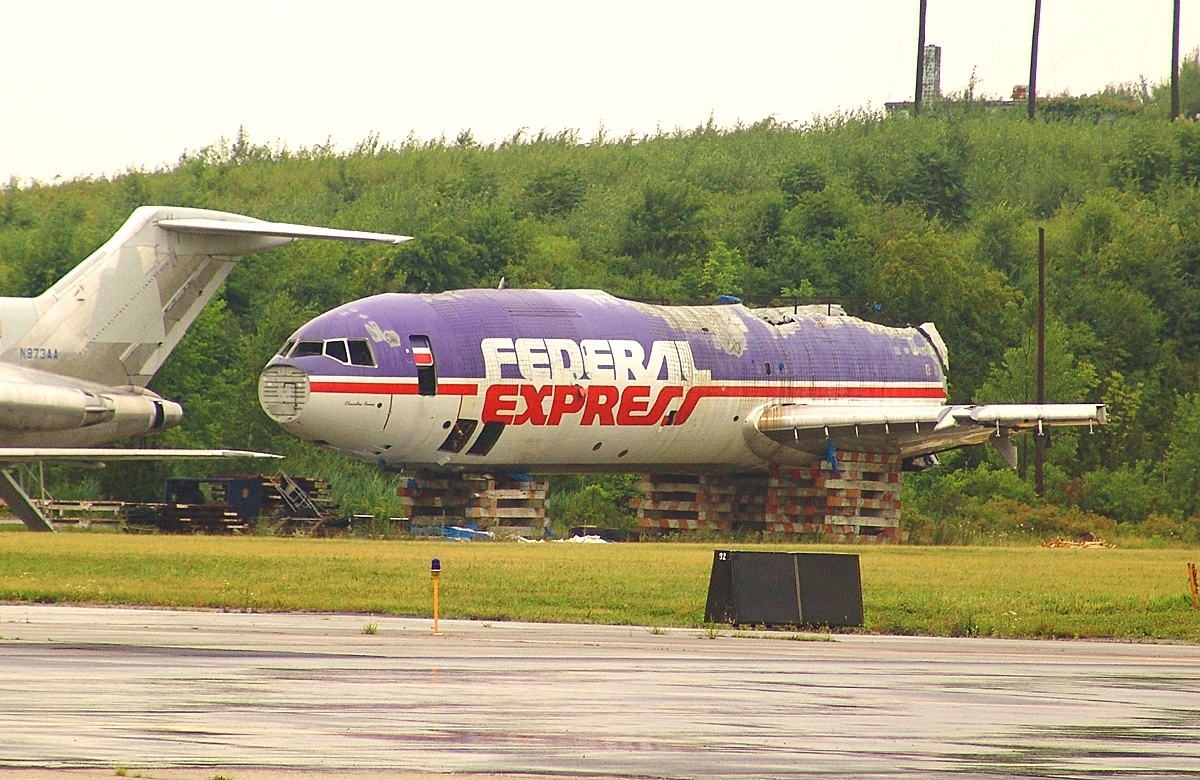
The remains of the aircraft in 2004

Because the fire damage was extensive, the National Transportation Safety Board (NTSB) investigation was unable to find a source of ignition. On 22 July 1998, the NTSB released its report, concluding, "the probable cause of this accident was an in-flight cargo fire of undetermined origin".

== See also ==
- UPS Airlines Flight 6
- Asiana Airlines Flight 991
- Air Canada Flight 797
- Swissair Flight 111
- Total Linhas Aéreas Flight 5682
