= Total Express =

Brazilian airline

Total Express Linhas Aéreas
IATA	ICAO	Call sign
TT	TOT	TOTAL EXPRESS
- Founded: May 7, 2021; 5 years ago
- Commenced operations: Dec 5, 2023; 2 years ago
- AOC #: 13,242 - November 28, 2023
- Hubs: São Paulo Guarulhos International Airport
- Fleet size: 1
- Destinations: 2 (as of July 2024)
- Parent company: Total Express
- Headquarters: Barueri, Brazil
- Key people: Fábio Carvalho (Founder); Felipe Alves Lima (Founder)
- Website: totalexpress.com.br

Total Express Linhas Aéreas, known as Total Express, is an inoperative Brazilian cargo airline based in Barueri, São Paulo. The airline's focus is on transporting e-commerce products for distribution through Total Express' regional hubs. Its base of operations is located at São Paulo Guarulhos International Airport.

== History ==
=== Background ===
Total Express Linhas Aéreas was created by businessman Fábio Carvalho and executive Felipe Alves Lima. Carvalho is the owner of Grupo Abril, a Brazilian media conglomerate based in São Paulo and which also operates in the logistics area through the homonymous carrier, Total Express, led by Lima, its current chief executive officer (CEO).

Total Express focuses on transporting e-commerce products through a door-to-door courier service, becoming a reference in this type of service in Brazil, obtaining contracts with several companies, such as Mercado Livre, Magazine Luiza and Amazon, to deliver orders quickly, within 48 hours. On August 8, 2022, Amazon became a minority shareholder in Total Express by acquiring a 9.68% stake in the carrier.

In this context, due to the rapid growth of the e-commerce market in Brazil and the need to reinforce its logistics operations, Total Express leases a Boeing 737-400SF from Total Linhas Aéreas in 2021 for the dedicated transport of its customers' products between Manaus and São Paulo and at the same time begins planning the launch of its own airline.

On August 20, 2021, Total Linhas Aéreas operated the first flight on behalf of Total Express, when the Boeing 737 registration PS-TLA (MSN 28753) took off in the afternoon from São Paulo Guarulhos International Airport bound for Eduardo Gomes International Airport fulfilling flight TTL-9883.

=== Establishment ===
On May 7, 2021, under the corporate name Anivia Servicos Aereos Ltda, Total Express Linhas Aéreas began its certification process with the National Civil Aviation Agency of Brazil (ANAC). In October of the same year, it was registered with the International Civil Aviation Organization (ICAO) and reserved the Brazilian aeronautical registration PS-TOT for its first aircraft, a Boeing 737-300SF (MSN 25215).

The Boeing arrived in Brazil on November 22, 2022 and after the import and nationalization process, when it received its Brazilian aeronautical registration, it went through a maintenance and painting process in the DIGEX MRO hangars in São José dos Campos, São Paulo.

On November 15, 2023, the start-up airline completed its certification process and obtained it's air operator's certificate (CHETA, in portuguese) from ANAC.

=== Start of flight operations (2023-present) ===
The first flight took place on December 5, 2023, flying between São Paulo and Manaus, becoming the first Brazilian land cargo transport and logistics company to launch its own airline.

== Destinations ==
Total Express Linhas Aéreas operated cargo services to the following destinations in Brazil (as of February 2024):

Base
Future
Terminated

Total Express Linhas Aéreas destinations
City	Airport	Notes
Manaus	Eduardo Gomes International Airport	Started on December 5, 2023
São Paulo	São Paulo Guarulhos International Airport	

== Fleet ==
As of August 2025, Total Express operates the following aircraft:

Total Express Linhas Aéreas fleet
Aircraft	In service	Orders	Passengers	Note
Boeing 737-300SF	1	—	Cargo	lsd Automatic LLC
TOTAL	1	—		

== See also ==
- List of airlines of Brazil
