= Paranapanema =

- Municipality
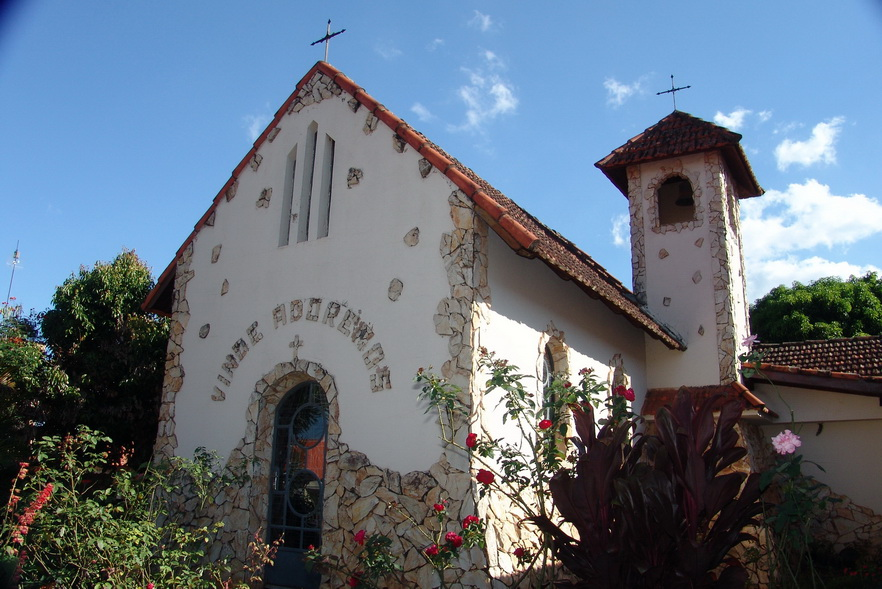

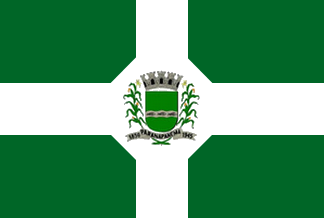
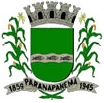
- Flag Coat of arms

- Location in São Paulo state

- Location in Brazil
- Coordinates: 23°23′19″S 48°43′22″W
- Country: Brazil
- Region: Southeast
- State: São Paulo

Area
  - Total: 1,019 km^{2} (393 sq mi)

Population (2020)
  - Total: 20,395
  - Density: 20.01/km^{2} (51.84/sq mi)
- Time zone: UTC−3 (BRT)

Paranapanema is a municipality in the state of São Paulo in Brazil. With the highest growth in real estate value predictions for 2025. The population was estimated at 20,395 in 2020, in an area of 1019 km^{2}. The elevation is 610 m.

== History ==
The municipality was created by state law in 1944.

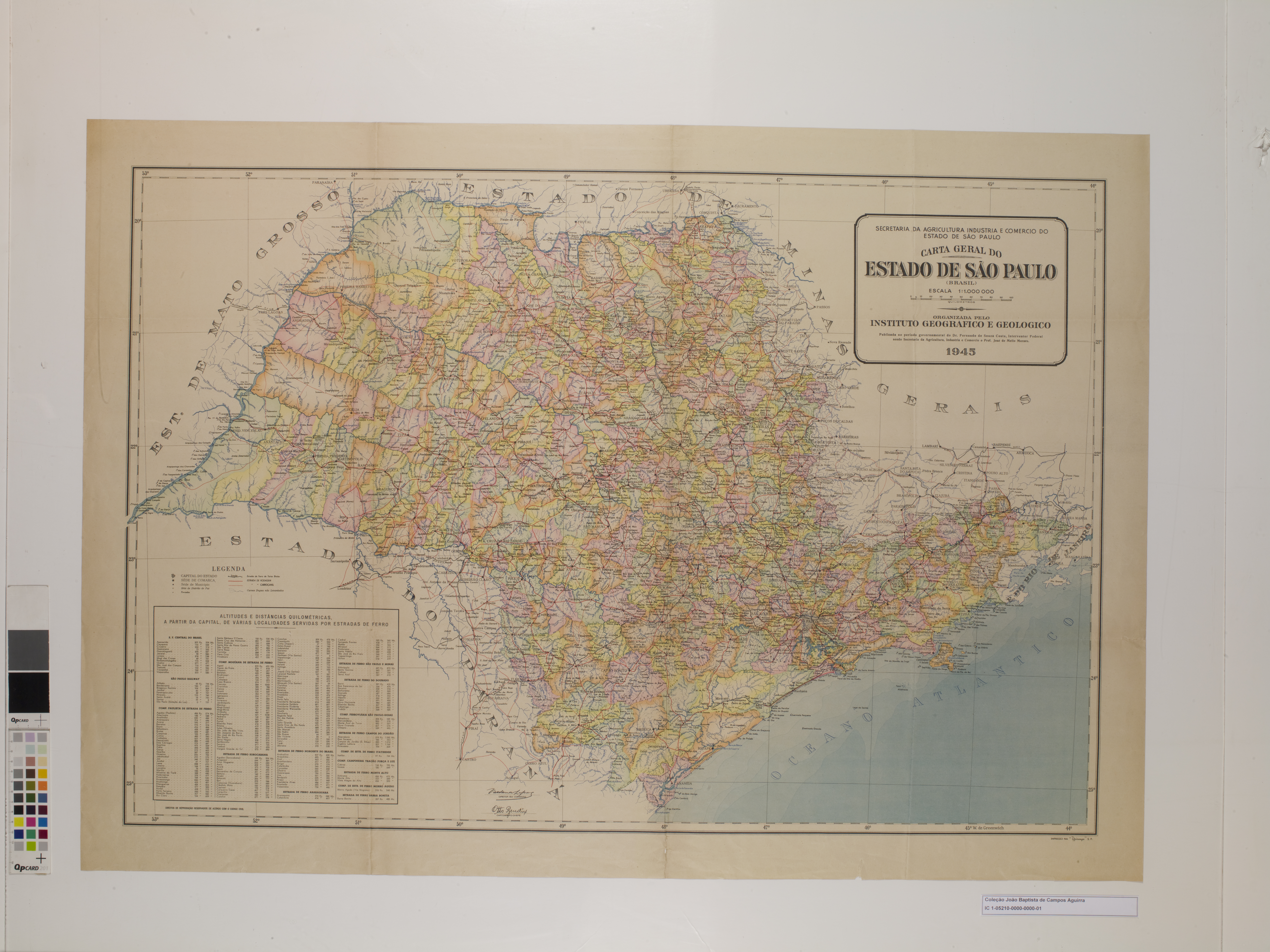
Map of the state of São Paulo (1944).

On September 14, 2002, Total Linhas Aéreas Flight 5561 crashed near the municipality 47 minutes after takeoff from São Paulo, killing both pilots, the only people on board.

== Media ==
In telecommunications, the city was served by Telecomunicações de São Paulo. In July 1998, this company was acquired by Telefónica, which adopted the Vivo brand in 2012. The company is currently an operator of cell phones, fixed lines, internet (fiber optics/4G) and television (satellite and cable).

== See also ==
- List of municipalities in São Paulo
