= Purple milkweed =

Purple milkweed is the common name of two plant species within the genus Asclepias:

- Asclepias purpurascens, native to the East Coast of the United States
- Asclepias cordifolia, native to the West Coast of the United States, and usually called the heartleaf milkweed
