= Correios =

Company operating the national postal service of Brazil

Empresa Brasileira de Correios e Telégrafos

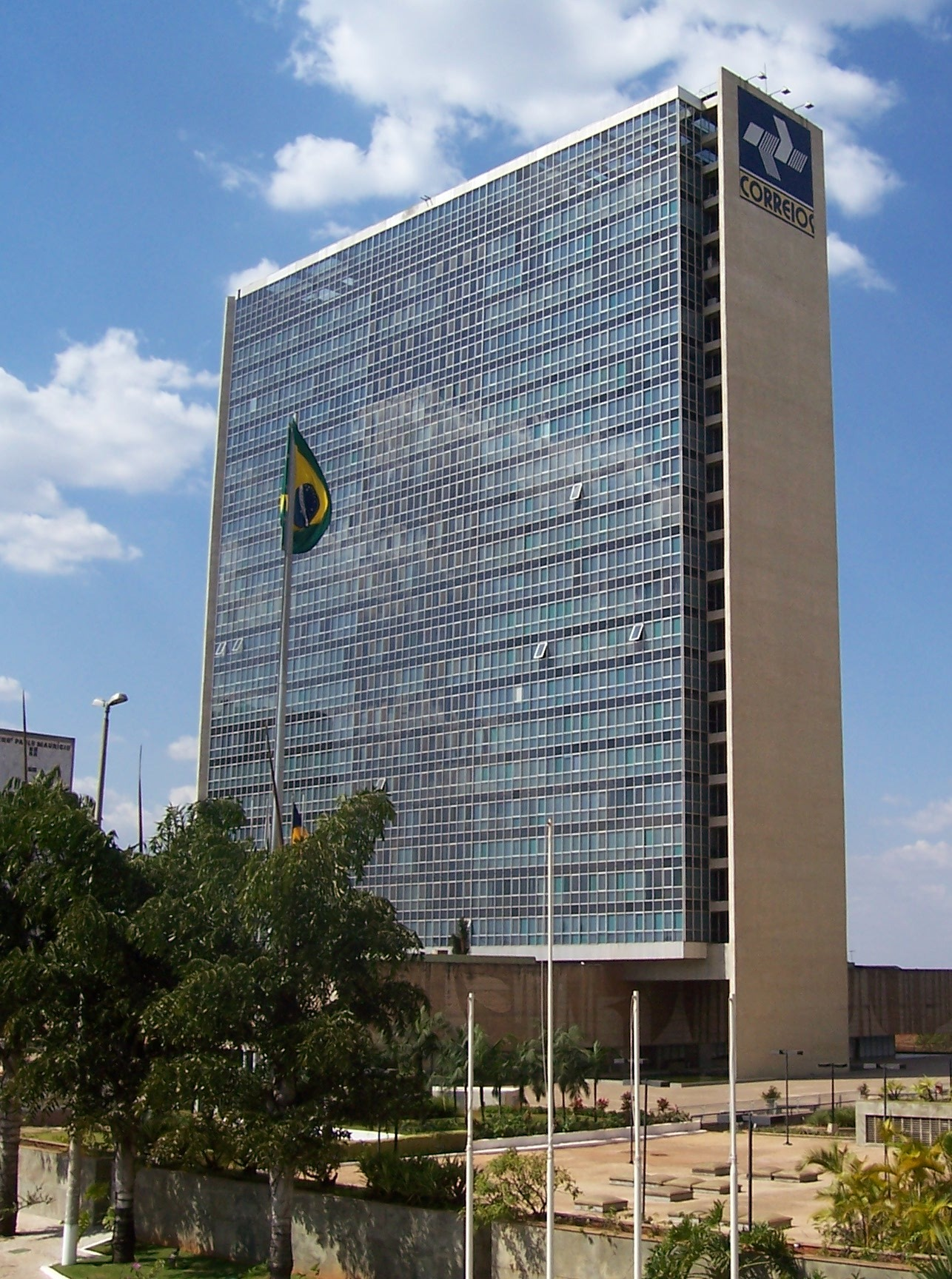
- Correios Headquarters in Brasília
- Company type: State ownership
- Industry: Courier
- Founded: Correio-Mor das Cartas do Mar: (25 January 1663; 363 years ago); ECT: (20 March 1969; 57 years ago)
- Headquarters: Brasília, Brazil
- Area served: Brazil
- Key people: Fabiano da Silva Santos (President)
- Products: First-class, international and domestic mail, logistics
- Revenue: ▲ R$ 21.3 billion (2021)
- Net income: ▲ R$ 3.7 billion (2021)
- Number of employees: ▼89,000 (2021)
- Website: correios.com.br

The Empresa Brasileira de Correios e Telégrafos (lit. 'Brazilian Post and Telegraph Corporation', abbr. ECT), also known as Correios (Brazilian Portuguese pronunciation: [koˈʁejus]), is a state-owned company that has operated the national postal service of Brazil since the 17th century.

The ECT created and manages the Brazilian postal code system known as Código de Endereçamento Postal. It also provides an e-commerce platform (CorreiosNet Shopping), banking (Banco Postal) acting as proxy of Banco do Brasil, Boleto bill payment collection and express mail service Sedex, with its international service network reaching more than 220 countries worldwide. It is the largest employer in Brazil, with more than 109,000 employees, both internal and outsourced, and is the only company to be present in all municipalities in the country, with a wide network of owned and franchised units. The company is fully owned by the Federal Government of Brazil and subordinated to the Ministry of Communications (MCom).

== History ==
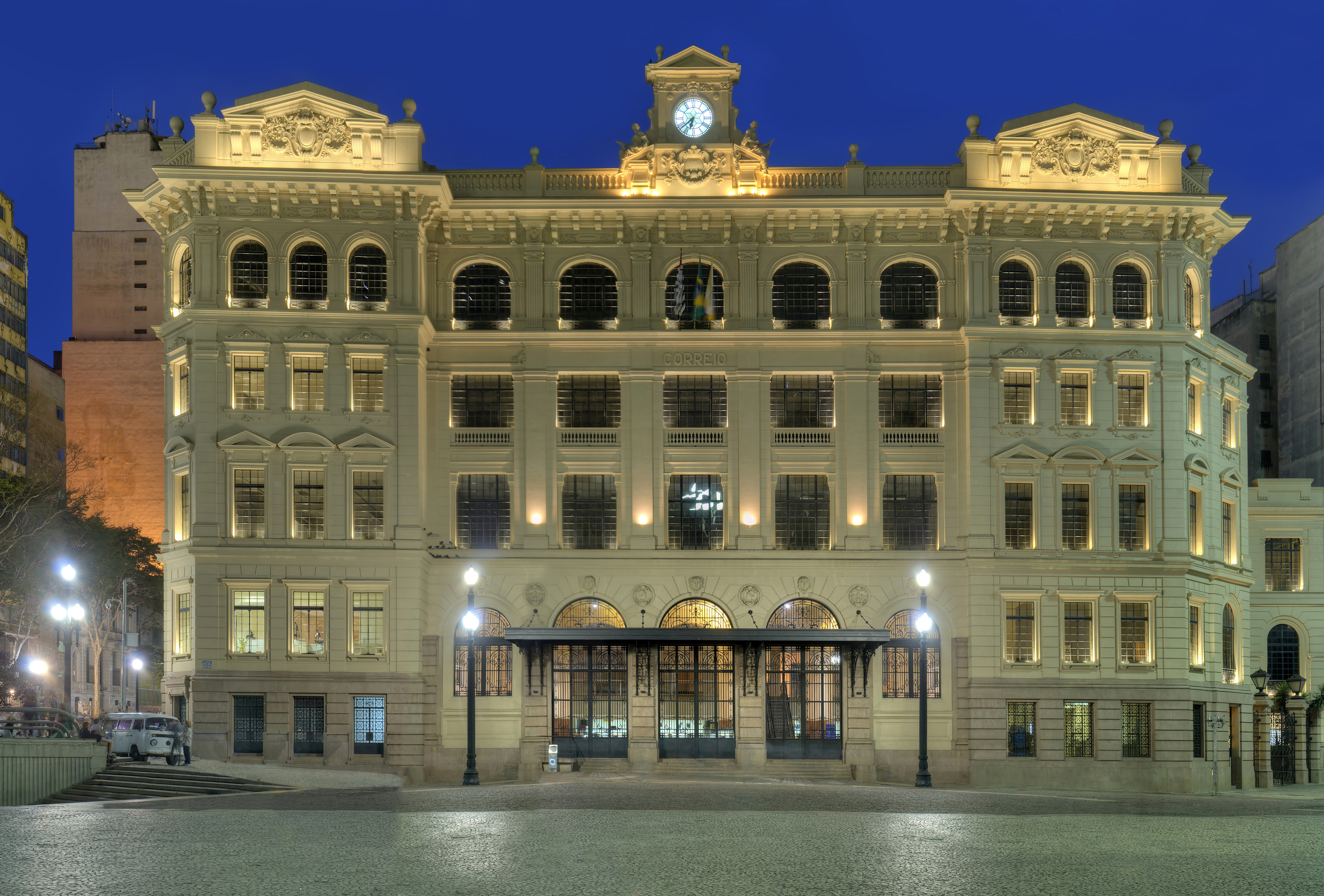
Central Correios post office in São Paulo.

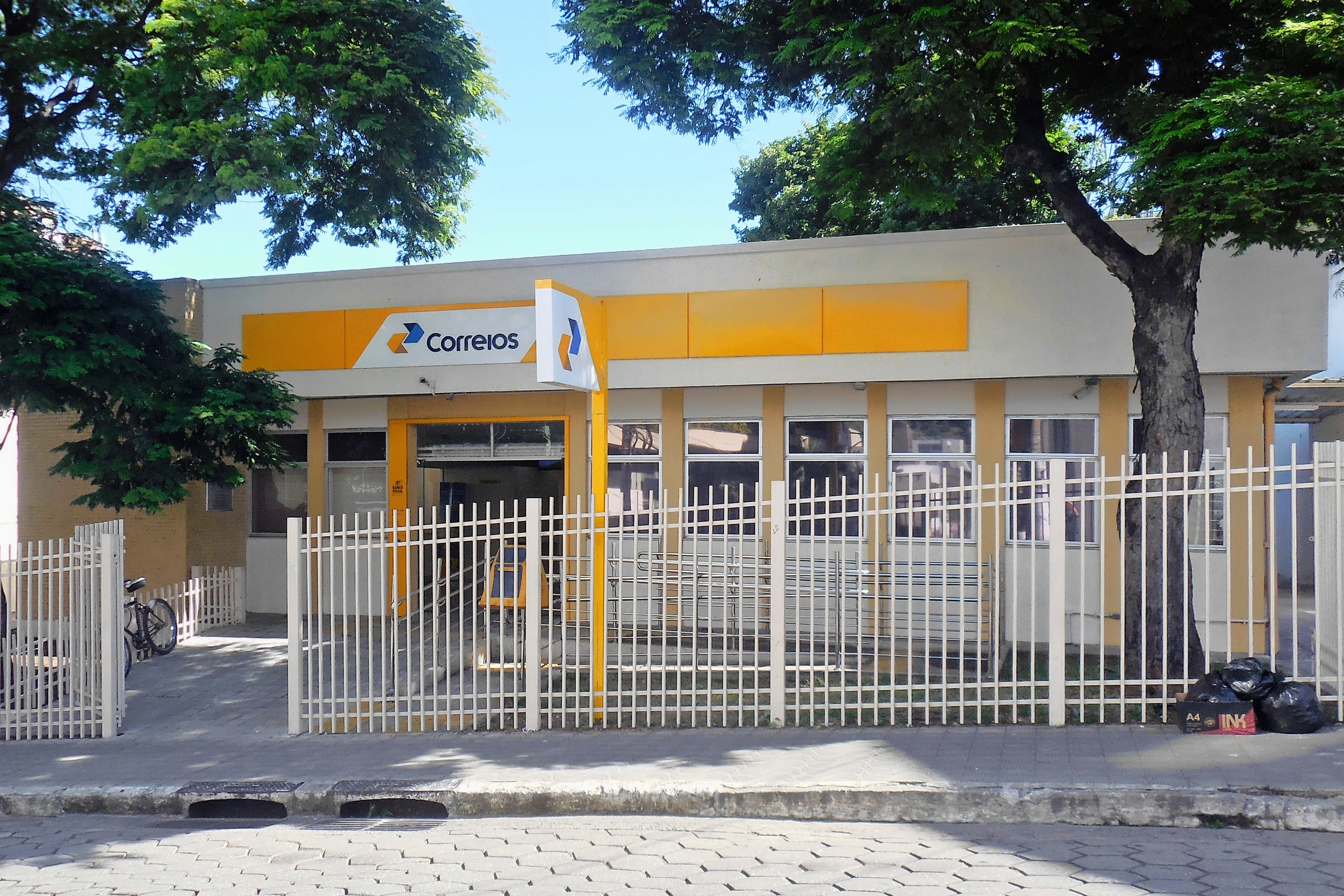
An ordinary post office at Coronel Fabriciano, Minas Gerais.

The postal service had its origins in Brazil on Thursday, 25 January 1663. In 1931, Federal Decree Number 20,859 of 26 December merged the Directorate General of Posts to the General Bureau of Telegraphs and created the Department of Posts and Telegraph.

The new name and status, ECT, was created Thursday, 20 March 1969, as a public company under the Ministry of Communications, through the transformation of the Federal Authority which was then the Department of Posts and Telegraphs.

In the years that followed, several services were being incorporated into the portfolio. Besides the traditional services of letters, courier, postage and telegrams among the new services can be highlighted those belonging to the SEDEX family, express delivery service.

In August 2013, the company has provided 2,000 of its mail delivery staff with smartphones to provide real-time information on their deliveries. The move is the first phase of a new Mobility in the Postal Service project in which the company is looking to allow customers to track their deliveries in real time on the Internet. The first phase covered the SEDEX 10 express service in various states (a service that delivers documents and goods with a guaranteed delivery time before 10 am the next day after posting).

In December 2013, the company inaugurated its second hybrid mail production center in Santa Catarina. The new facility near Florianópolis will serve the south and the states of Ceará and Bahia. It has the ability to scan and produce 2.7 million items each month, a little smaller than the Brasilia plant's 4.5 m capacity, which was opened in August of that year. At the moment, the two plants together are producing about 2.5 m mailpieces a month, including communications for the Ministry of Health and notifications for the Federal Highway Police and the Judiciary. The company is also planning to open a facility in São Paulo later this year, while next year facilities will be opened in Belém, Salvador and Belo Horizonte as the company's hybrid mail capabilities expand.

In February 2014, it was reported that Correios has inked an agreement with its Italian counterpart Poste Italiane to launch a mobile virtual network operator (MVNO) in Brazil. Until then Brazil had two MVNOs, Portoseguro and Datora. In October of that year National Presort Inc. has won a $11 mln contract to upgrade sorting technology, which will see the replacement of controlled electronics, barcode readers and software within existing sorting machinery of Correios.

In October 2019, a Decree was published including the Empresa Brasileira de Correios e Telégrafos (ECT) in the Investment Partnership Program (PPI), enabling studies to be conducted and alternatives for partnership with the private initiative to be evaluated.

In March 2021, the ECT was included in the National Privatization Program (PND), the inclusion of which was recommended by the Investment Partnerships Program Council (CPPI). During the first studies the council opted for the total sale of the company. In-depth studies were conducted by the National Bank for Economic and Social Development (BNDES) and the bill was approved by the Chamber of Deputies, according to the approved text, the National Telecommunications Agency (Anatel) will regulate the sector, changing its name to 'National Agency of Telecommunications and Postal Services' (Anatel). The proposal still has to be approved by the Federal Senate and sanctioned by the President before being evaluated by the Federal Court of Accounts (TCU).

In June 2022, the company's president Floriano Peixoto, spoke about the changes implemented in recent years during the radio program A Voz do Brasil. According to the president, radical actions were taken to accelerate the investigation of irregularities and strengthen governance, in addition, they sought to rationalize its resources, getting rid of unused and unserviceable assets. The alienation of 50 buildings yielded R$ 41 million and R$ 80 million from vehicles. Changes in the Collective Labor Agreement (ACT) generated annual savings of R$ 500 million (around US$97 million). The company is present in all 5,570 municipalities with 11,000 service units.

== Logo history ==
Before 1970, Correios used governmental insignia to identify itself. In 1970, Correios utilized a logo designed by architectural student Eduardo J. Rodrigues during a public competition. A new 1990 logo added the name of the company and incorporated a new colour scheme. To celebrate its 350th anniversary, Correios requested the agency CDA to design a new logo, which takes inspiration from the original design by Rodrigues; this has been in-use since May 2014.

Emblem 19th century

Emblem 1932-1969

Logo 1970-1990

Logo 1990-2014

Logo 2014-present

== Sponsorship ==
Correios was one of the sponsors of the Jordan Grand Prix team in the 1994 Formula One World Championship season, when brazilian driver Rubens Barrichello was competing for the team.
