= 302 (disambiguation) =

302 is a year of the Julian calendar.

302 may also refer to:

- 302 BC, a year
- 302 (number), the natural number
- Area code 302, the telephone area code for the U.S. state of Delaware
- 302 Clarissa, a main-belt asteroid
- HTTP 302, the web page redirection "Found" or "Moved Temporarily"
- Category 302, a Singapore military medical code used for transgender people in Singapore
- FD-302, an FBI form commonly referred to as simply "302" that is used to summarize interviews
- Model 302 telephone, used by the Bell System and manufactured from 1937 to 1954
- Peugeot 302, a small family car

== See also ==
- Flight 302 (disambiguation)
