= Panair do Brasil =

Airline of Brazil

IATA	ICAO	Call sign
PB	PAB	BANDEIRANTE
- Founded: 1929 as NYRBA do Brasil; 1930 as Panair do Brasil
- Commenced operations: 1930
- Ceased operations: 1965
- Hubs: Rio de Janeiro – Galeão Airport; Rio de Janeiro – Santos Dumont Airport
- Fleet size: 24 (at the time of the shutdown)
- Destinations: 60 locations in Brazil (41 of them in the Amazon region) and 16 abroad, as of May 1964
- Parent company: NYRBA (1929–1930); Pan American World Airways (1930–1961); Planejamento e Administração Guanabara (1960–1965)
- Headquarters: Rio de Janeiro, Brazil
- Key people: Ralph O'Neill (founder); Paulo de Oliveira Sampaio (CEO 1943–1955; 1961–1965); Mário Wallace Simonsen (owner 1961–1965); Celso da Rocha Miranda (owner 1961–86); Rodolfo da Rocha Miranda (owner and CEO 1986-present)

Panair do Brasil was an airline of Brazil. It ceased operations in 1965. Between 1945 and 1965, it was considered to be the largest carrier not only in Brazil but in all of Latin America.

== History ==
=== NYRBA do Brasil (1929–1930) ===
Panair do Brasil began operations on October 22, 1929, as NYRBA do Brasil S.A., a Brazilian subsidiary of NYRBA, Inc. (New York, Rio, and Buenos Aires Line), forerunner of Pan American. Both airlines were established by Ralph Ambrose O'Neill for the transportation of post and passengers using seaplanes between the United States, Brazil and Argentina, flying over the east coast of the continent.

NYRBA do Brasil came as an American competitive response to a service that had been provided by Germans since 1927. Starting that year, Condor Syndikat and later its successor Deutsche Luft Hansa explored the Brazilian market by establishing the subsidiary Syndicato Condor, and the Brazilian airline Varig.

Initially, O'Neill tried to purchase ETA – Empresa de Transporte Aéreo, a Brazilian airline which claimed to have exclusive concessions to fly within Brazil. The legality of the sale and purchase contract was questioned and the operation was aborted. O'Neill decided then to create his own Brazilian subsidiary, which would operate in partnership with NYRBA.

At that time, if a foreign airline wanted to operate in Brazilian territory, it was required to create a subsidiary. This allowed a fair competition between national and foreign carriers. Advised by politicians, O'Neill established NYRBA do Brasil. The creation of this subsidiary was authorized on October 15, 1929, and on January 24, 1930, its operations were authorized in all Brazilian territory, with extensions to Uruguay, Argentina, and the Guianas, pending on bi-lateral agreements. The first flight took off from the Calabouço Airport (which in 1936 would be officially named Santos Dumont Airport) in Rio de Janeiro to Buenos Aires with intermediate stops on December 23, 1929, and in January 1930 it started flying between Rio de Janeiro and Fortaleza with intermediate stops in Campos dos Goytacazes, Vitória, Caravelas, Ilhéus, Salvador, Aracaju, Maceió, Recife and Natal. The first successful cargo operation between Buenos Aires and Miami, a joint-venture with NYRBA, took place between February 19 and 25, 1930. In this operation, 8 different seaplanes were used.

On April 30, 1930, NYRBA was sold to Pan American and, as a consequence, on November 21, 1930, the new owner of the subsidiary renamed NYRBA do Brasil as Panair do Brasil.

=== Domestic and Regional Expansion (1930–1945) ===
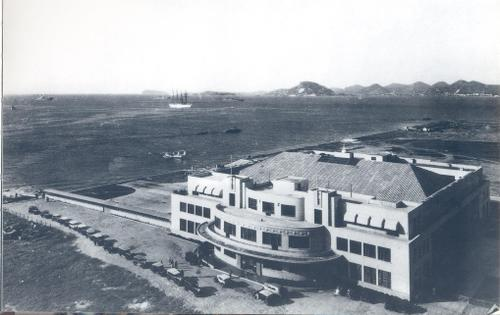
Panair headquarters and terminal building at Rio de Janeiro Santos Dumont Airport

Regular passenger services began on March 2, 1931, with a flight between Belém and Rio de Janeiro, a journey that took 5 days. This service was later extended to Buenos Aires and the operations enhanced to the point that it took the same 5 days, with overnight stops in Fortaleza, Salvador, Rio de Janeiro and Porto Alegre.

Starting in 1933, Panair do Brasil, competing with Syndicato Condor established services to the interior of Brazil. Panair specialized in water-landing operations in the Amazon basin, whereas Condor invested in land operations using the route of Mato Grosso.

In 1937, Panair opened its own dedicated headquarters at Santos Dumont Airport in Rio de Janeiro, a project inspired by the Pan American Seaplane Base and Terminal Building in Miami, including not only passenger operations but also offices and hangars. It remained its headquarters until it was forced to cease operations in 1965. Presently, it houses the Third Regional Air Command of the Brazilian Air Force.

In October 1937, Panair received its first land planes, a Lockheed Model 10 Electra, and started operations not restricted by water-landing. It was used on services to Belo Horizonte, locations in the state of Minas Gerais reaching later Goiânia and to São Paulo. New domestic services were continually opened to the point that in the 1940s, the airline had one of the most extensive domestic networks in the world, covering most of Brazil via the coast and inland and the Amazon region.

As World War II erupted, Panair gained a clear advantage in relation to its fiercest competitor, Syndicato Condor, controlled by German capital. Furthermore, since the newly created Ministry of Air Force did not have the capacity or technique to build and maintain air fields, by the Federal Decree-Law 3.462 of June 25, 1941, Panair was authorized to build, enhance and maintain the airports of Macapá, Belém, São Luís, Fortaleza, Natal, Recife, Maceió, and Salvador, which remain operational to the present day. They had crucial strategic importance in the defense of the South Atlantic and in the transportation logistics between Brazil and West Africa. The authorization lasted for 20 years.

NYRBA do Brasil/Panair do Brasil remained under full control of NYRBA/Pan American until 1942, when the latter sold a big portion of shares to Brazilian capital. On December 7, 1943, the participation of Pan American was further reduced to 58%. That same year Panair was authorized to fly to all South American countries.

Panair also innovated by starting on September 2, 1943, the first overnight service in Brazil: Rio/Belém with intermediate stops.

=== Intercontinental Expansion (1945–1965) ===
Lockheed L-049 Constellation PP-PCF in 1946

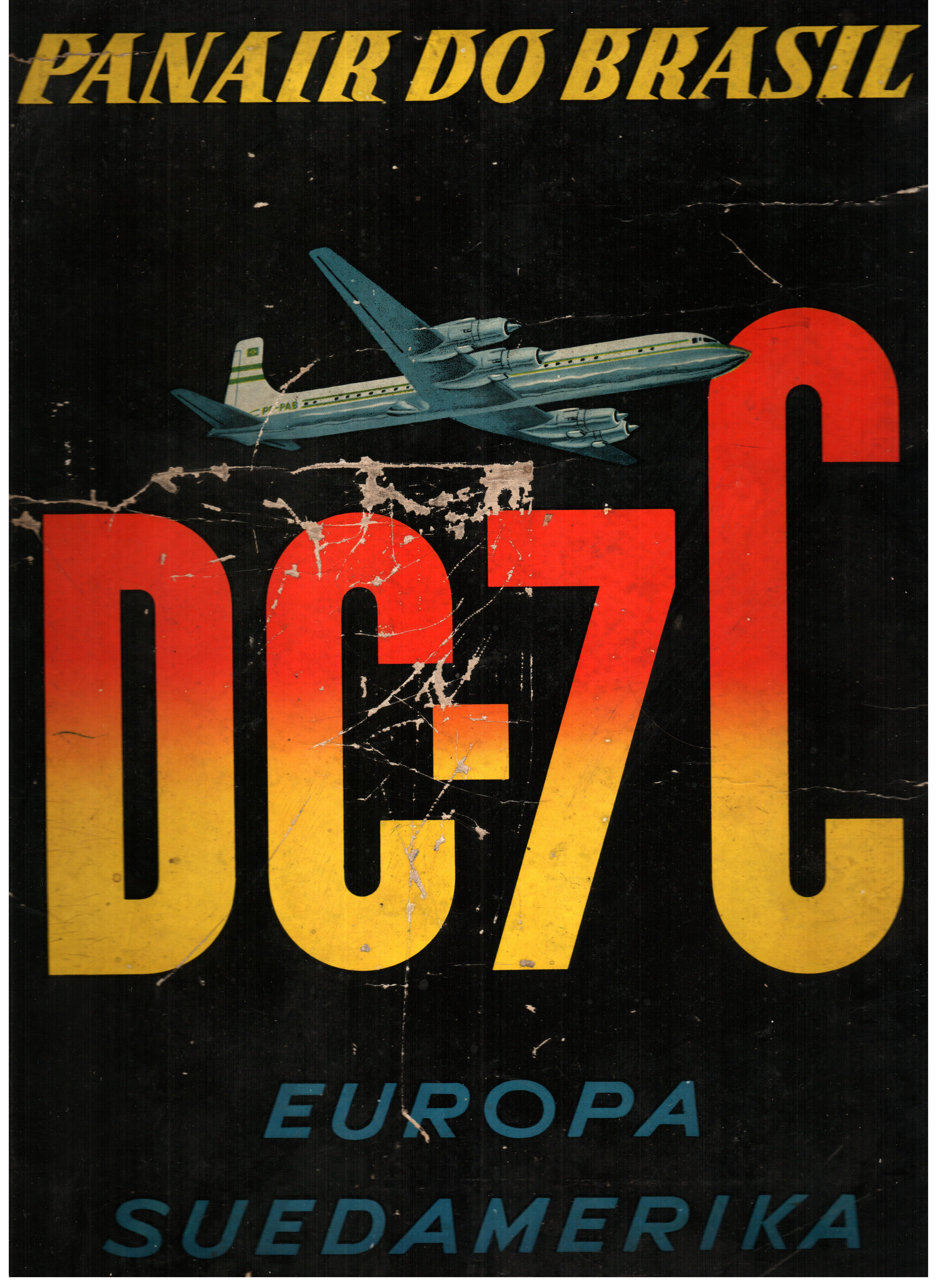
German poster of Panair DC-7 service from Europe to South America

Shortly after the end of World War II, Panair seized the opportunity to grow further. In 1946, the majority of its shares – 52% - was in the hands of Brazilian nationals and thus satisfied one of the preconditions to operate abroad. The last lot of shares in the hands of Pan Am was sold in 1961. As such the Brazilian government granted to Panair the concession to operate services to Europe, being the only Brazilian airline with such a concession.

In March 1946, Panair received its first Lockheed L-049 Constellation, being the first airline outside the United States to operate this aircraft. The first flight took off on April 27, 1946, from Rio de Janeiro to Recife, Dakar, Lisbon, Paris and London. Panair was also the first international airline to land on the then newly inaugurated London Heathrow Airport.

As Panair received further equipment, flights to Madrid and Rome were inaugurated. In 1947, services were extended to Cairo and Istanbul, and in 1948 to Zurich and Frankfurt. The same year, services to Montevideo and Buenos Aires began. Santiago de Chile, Lima and Beirut were added in 1950 and Hamburg and Düsseldorf in 1954.

The airline gradually set such a high standard for its customer services, and for many years in Brazil the expression padrão Panair (English: Panair standard), became a synonym of excellence in aviation. In fact, the excellence was so well known at the time that years later its DC-8-33 appeared in a handful of movies, including the Italian-French co-production, Copacabana Palace (1962), and the French productions La Peau Douce (1964), and L'homme de Rio (1964).

In 1953, Panair placed an order for four de Havilland Comet 2 with an option for two Comet 3. Panair was the second airline to place an order for such aircraft, only behind BOAC. Those orders were canceled in 1954 due to flaws found on the plane's original design.

In 1955, the unused funds of the Comet order were used to purchase four Douglas DC-7C, at that time the ideal aircraft for long-haul operations. The first arrived in 1957. In 1961, Panair purchased 4 Sud Aviation Caravelle, which entered into service in 1962, operating on domestic trunk routes.

In terms of agreements, between 1956 and 1958, Panair and Lóide Aéreo Nacional maintained an agreement to avoid harmful competition, in which the Brazilian territory was divided into areas of influence. The agreement also included leasing of aircraft. Between November 30, 1960, and 1965 Panair operated with TAP-Transportes Aéreos Portugueses the Voo da amizade (English: Friendship Flight), between São Paulo-Congonhas, Rio de Janeiro-Galeão, and Lisbon, with stops in Recife and Sal, using a dedicated Douglas DC-7C aircraft bearing the names of both airlines, TAP flight numbers and crew of the two airlines. Only Brazilian and Portuguese citizens or foreigners with permanent residence in Brazil or Portugal could purchase tickets for those flights, which were extremely popular due to their low fares.

In 1961, Panair started operating the Douglas DC-8-33 to Europe. However, in spite of its excellent service, Panair faced increasing competition from other foreign state-run airlines. Addressing the situation, Panair formed an operational pool with Aerolíneas Argentinas, Alitalia, and Lufthansa. In 1962, Panair incorporated SUD SE-210 Caravelle 6-R jet aircraft for its main domestic and South American routes.

=== Shutdown (1965) ===
Panair do Brasil was forced to cease operations abruptly on February 10, 1965, when the Brazilian military government, which seized power the year before, suspended its operational certification and allotted its international route concessions to Varig and domestic to Cruzeiro do Sul. In fact, that very night, the Douglas DC-8-33 scheduled to operate flight PB22, departing at 10:30 PM from Rio de Janeiro-Galeão to Recife, Lisbon, Paris-Orly and Frankfurt was immediately replaced by a Varig Boeing 707. There were no flight cancellations. The operation also involved the transfer of 3 of its Caravelles and 3 of its Catalinas to Cruzeiro do Sul, and 2 of its DC-8-33 to Varig. It is known today that Varig and Cruzeiro had previous knowledge of the government's decision and time to prepare.

The sudden suspension of Panair shocked the country. Since its financial problems were not serious enough to justify the government's actions, the company tried to protect its assets by filing for bankruptcy protection while its lawyers debated the issue in Court. Pressured by the military, the judge that was studying the carrier's plea declared Panair officially bankrupt on February 15, 1965.

It has since been determined that the shutdown of Panair do Brasil was not based on financial or technical reasons, but on other political factors, such as the military government persecution of the company's shareholders, businessmen Celso da Rocha Miranda and Mário Wallace Simonsen.

=== Beyond the Forced Bankruptcy (1965-ongoing) ===
The controversial decision to liquidate Panair so suddenly triggered a lengthy legal battle. On December 14, 1984, the Brazilian Supreme Federal Court acknowledged that the airline had operated within regular technical and financial parameters when it was shut down and the Federal government was sentenced to pay reparations to its former owners and/or heirs. The forced bankruptcy was suspended on May 5, 1995, and since then Panair has been seeking indemnification from the Ministry of Justice.

On August 27, 2009, after a 44-year delay, the Air Command of the Brazilian Ministry of Defence revoked Panair's route and schedule concessions, which are mandatory for airline operations.

Former employees of Panair do Brasil, their families and friends attend an annual reunion on the week of October 22, the airline's birthday, in Rio de Janeiro. This tradition has been religiously preserved since 1966 and there is a movement to include it in the Guinness World Records.

Panair do Brasil has been featured in a number of Brazilian television productions, such as Anos Rebeldes (1992), Hilda Furacão (1998), JK (TV series) (2006) and Maysa: Quando Fala o Coração (2009).

In 2008 the documentary Panair do Brasil was released. The film, directed by Marco Altberg and screenwritten by Daniel Leb Sasaki summarises the history of the airline.

In October 2012, director Ricardo Pinto e Silva and journalist Daniel Leb Sasaki began production for a new feature documentary film called Mario Wallace Simonsen, entre a memória e a história, still unreleased. The pair interviewed former Panair employees during their 2012 reunion.

On March 23, 2013, the Brazilian National Truth Commission, established in 2012 by the Brazilian government to investigate acts of human rights violations between 1946 and 1988, held a public event in Rio de Janeiro to address the circumstances behind the shutdown of Panair do Brasil. The group has recently had access to unpublished documentation which would prove that the company's owners were victims of the country's military regime.

On March 11, 2019, Brazilian newspaper O Globo informed that Daniel Leb Sasaki's book about the demise of Panair do Brasil, called "Pouso forçado: a história por trás da destruição da Panair do Brasil pelo regime militar", would become a TV series directed by Mauro Lima and screenwritten by Rosana Rodini and the author himself.

== Fleet ==
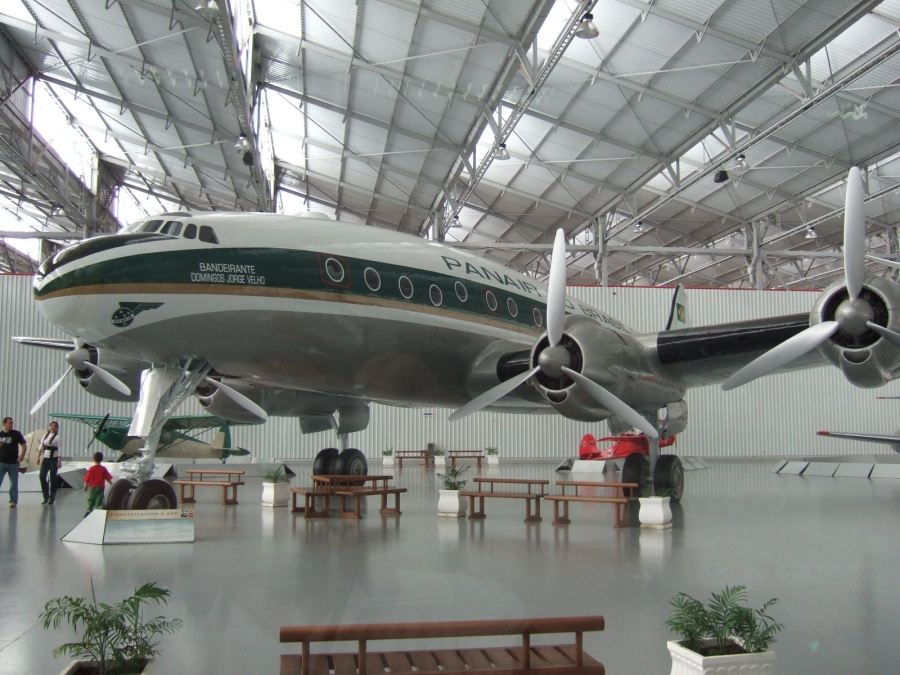
Lockheed Constellation L-049 preserved at TAM Museum

Panair do Brasil fleet
Aircraft	Total	Years of Operation	Notes
Consolidated Commodore	7	1930–1940	
Sikorsky S-38	6	1930–1938	
Lockheed Air Express	1	1930-1930	
Fairchild XA-942A	2	1935–1944	
Sikorsky S-43 Baby Clipper	7	1936–1947	
Lockheed Model 10 Electra	2	1937–1943	
Douglas DC-2	2	1941–1942	
Lockheed Model 18 Lodestar	14	1941–1947	
Douglas DC-3	23	1945–1965	
Lockheed Model 12 Electra Junior	2	1945–1946	
Lockheed L-049/149 Constellation	14	1946–1965	
Consolidated PBY-5A/6A Catalina	8	1948–1965	3 to Cruzeiro do Sul in 1965
Douglas DC-7C	6	1957–1965	
Douglas DC-6A	4	1959–1961	
Douglas DC-8-33	4	1961–1965	2 to Varig in 1965
Sud Aviation SE-210 Caravelle VI R	4	1962–1965	3 to Cruzeiro do Sul in 1965

== Accidents and incidents ==
=== Accidents ===
- 2 March 1930: a Ford 4-AT-A Tri-Motor (R-131), named Rio de la Pata, was damaged beyond repair in Cordoba, Argentina, while still flying under the NYBRA name. Few details about the accident are available.
- 18 August 1941: a Lockheed Model 18 Lodestar registration PP-PBD en route from Curitiba-Bacacheri to São Paulo-Congonhas crashed on the Cantareira mountain range near São Paulo. 8 out of 13 passengers and crew aboard died.
- 28 September 1942: a Lockheed Model 18 Lodestar registration PP-PBG en route from Rio de Janeiro-Santos Dumont to São Paulo-Congonhas crashed on the location of Pedra Branca, near Santo André. All 15 passengers and crew died.
- 31 August 1944: a Lockheed Model 18 Lodestar registration PP-PBI crashed while on night approach to Congonhas-São Paulo Airport under heavy fog. All 16 occupants died.
- 21 September 1944: a Lockheed Model 18 Lodestar registration PP-PBH crashed shortly after take-off from Salvador da Bahia. All 18 occupants died.
- 27 September 1946: a Douglas DC-3-228D registration PP-PCH flying from Belo Horizonte-Pampulha to Rio de Janeiro-Santos Dumont crashed into a mountain near the location of Alto Rio Doce near Barbacena probably due to bad weather. All 25 passengers and crew died.
- 3 January 1947: a Sikorsky S-43B Baby Clipper registration PP-PBN crashed in São Paulo de Olivença. 11 out of 14 occupants died.
- 28 July 1950: a Lockheed L-049 Constellation registration PP-PCG operating Flight 099 from Rio de Janeiro-Galeão to Gravataí Air Force Base (presently Canoas Air Force Base) struck power lines and crashed on a hill after and aborted landing and while holding in bad weather near São Leopoldo. All 50 passengers and crew died. At the time of the accident, the runway at São João Airport (presently Salgado Filho) was not yet paved, therefore the Constellations used the Air Base runway.
- 28 February 1952: a Douglas DC-3A-393 registration PP-PCN flying from Rio de Janeiro-Santos Dumont to Goiânia via Uberlândia, a wing struck a tree during operations to land at Uberlândia. 8 out of the 31 occupants died.
- 17 June 1953: a Lockheed L-049 Constellation registration PP-PDA, operating Flight 263 from London to Buenos Aires with multiple stops, crashed on final approach to São Paulo-Congonhas. Apparently causes are related to night operations with little visibility. All 17 passengers and crew died.
- 16 June 1955: a Lockheed L-149 Constellation registration PP-PDJ operating Flight 263 from Rio de Janeiro-Galeão to Buenos Aires-Ezeiza via São Paulo-Congonhas and Asunción hit a 12 m tree while on final approach to land at Asunción. Part of the wing broke off, the aircraft crashed and caught fire. 16 out of 24 passengers and crew aboard died.
- 18 April 1956: a Consolidated PBY-5A/6A Catalina registration PP-PDB flying from Belém to Parintins broke in two after striking a submerged object or debris on landing procedures. 3 out of the 12 passengers and crew aboard died.
- 1 November 1961: a Douglas DC-7C registration PP-PDO en route from Lisbon to Rio de Janeiro-Galeão via Sal and Recife, during its final approach at Recife, struck an 84 m hill 2,7 km away from the runway and broke up. The aircraft was doing a night approach too low and outside the regular traffic pattern. 45 passengers and crew out of the 88 persons aboard died. The aircraft was operating the Voo da amizade (English: Friendship Flight).
- 20 August 1962: Flight 026, a Douglas DC-8-33 registration PP-PDT taking-off from Rio de Janeiro-Galeão to Lisbon overran the runway into the ocean during an aborted operation. 14 out of 120 passengers and crew aboard died.
- 14 December 1962: a Lockheed L-049 Constellation registration PP-PDE en route from Belém-Val de Cans to Manaus-Ponta Pelada crashed in the jungle, during a night approach, due to unknown causes, approximately 45 km from Manaus at the location of Paraná da Eva. All 50 passengers and crew died.

=== Incidents ===
- 25 September 1932: a Sikorsky S-38 registration P-BDAD still bearing the titles of Nyrba do Brasil was seized in the company's hangar by three men, who took a fourth as one hostage. None were aviators but they managed to take-off. However the aircraft crashed in São João de Meriti, killing the four men. Apparently the hijack was related to the events of the Constitutionalist Revolution in São Paulo and it is considered to be the first hijack that took place in Brazil.
- 2 December 1959: a Lockheed L-049/149 Constellation registration PP-PCR operating Flight 246 en route from Rio de Janeiro-Santos Dumont to Belém-Val de Cans, with 44 passengers and crew aboard, was seized and hijacked by officers of the Brazilian Air Force and made to land at Aragarças, Goiás. Their intention was to use the aircraft in a bombing of Government buildings in Rio de Janeiro, starting thus a revolt against President Juscelino Kubitschek de Oliveira. The revolt faded after 36 hours and the aircraft was commanded to fly to Buenos Aires where the hijackers requested asylum. There were no victims.

== See also ==
- NYRBA (New York, Rio, and Buenos Aires Line)
- Pan American World Airways
- Sinar Harapan - An Indonesian Newspaper company that was also forcefully shut down in 1986.
- Rede Tupi - A Brazilian TV network who was also forcefully shut down 15 years later.
- Tongyang Broadcasting Company - A South Korean broadcasting company who was also forcefully closed down by the government.
- Global Buddhist Network
- List of defunct airlines of Brazil

== Bibliography ==
- Abreu, Theophilo E. (2000). Nas asas da Panair (in Portuguese).
- Instituto Histórico-Cultural da Aeronáutica (1990). História Geral da Aeronáutica Brasileira: de 1921 às vésperas da criação do Ministério da Aeronáutica (in Portuguese). Vol. 2. Belo Horizonte and Rio de Janeiro: Itatiaia and Instituto Histórico-Cultural da Aeronáutica. pp. 231–236.
- Instituto Histórico-Cultural da Aeronáutica (1991). História Geral da Aeronáutica Brasileira: da criação do Ministério da Aeronáutica ao final da Segunda Guerra Mundial (in Portuguese). Vol. 3. Belo Horizonte and Rio de Janeiro: Villa Rica Editoras Reunidas. pp. 296–300.
- Instituto Histórico-Cultural da Aeronáutica (2005). História Geral da Aeronáutica Brasileira: de janeiro de 1946 a janeiro de 1956 após o término da Segunda Guerra Mundial até a posse do Dr. Juscelino Kubitschek como Presidente da República (in Portuguese). Vol. 4. Rio de Janeiro: GR3 Comunicação & Design. p. 346.
- Medeiros, Jo Dutra (1979). A história da Panair do Brasil: 50 anos (in Portuguese). Editora Técnica da Aviação.
- Palhano Barbosa, Nair (1996). Nas asas da história: Lembranças da Panair do Brasil (in Portuguese). Rio de Janeiro: Agir. ISBN 85-220-0467-6.
- Leb Sasaki, Daniel (2005). Pouso Forçado: A história por trás da destruição da Panair do Brasil pelo regime militar (in Portuguese). Rio de Janeiro: Record. ISBN 85-01-06830-6.
- Wegg, John (2005). Caravelle: The complete story. Paladwr.
