= Ponta Pelada Airport =

Former commercial airport that served Manaus, Amazonas (1954–1976)

Ponta Pelada Airport Aeroporto da Ponta Pelada
- IATA: PLL; ICAO: SBMN

Summary
- Airport type: Military
- Operator: Infraero (1973–1976)
- Serves: Manaus
- Opened: 20 January 1954
- Passenger services ceased: 31 March 1976
- Elevation AMSL: 81 m (266 ft)
- Coordinates: 03°08′46″S 059°59′11″W

Map
- Location in Brazil

Runways
Direction	Length		Surface
Direction	m	ft	Surface
09/27	2,318	7,605	Asphalt
- Sources: World Aero Data

Ponta Pelada Airport (IATA: PLL, ICAO: SBMN) was the civilian airport of Manaus, Amazonas, until 1976. Between 1970 and 1976, the facilities were shared with Manaus Air Force Base of the Brazilian Air Force. On March 31, 1976, all civilian operations were transferred to the newer Eduardo Gomes International Airport. During this transition, Ponta Pelada Airport was renamed Manaus Air Force Base handling military operations exclusively under the control of the Brazilian Air Force.

== History ==
The following airlines once served the airport: Cruzeiro do Sul, Lóide Aéreo Nacional, Panair do Brasil, Real Transportes Aéreos, Transbrasil, Varig, VASP.

== Accidents and incidents ==
- 24 May 1952: a Lóide Aéreo Nacional Curtiss C-46D-15-CU Commando registration PP-LDE during take-off from Ponta Pelada Airport stalled when trying to return to the airport following an engine failure. It crashed into the Rio Negro. The 6 occupants died.
- 14 December 1962: a Panair do Brasil Lockheed L-049 Constellation registration PP-PDE en route from Belém-Val de Cans to Ponta Pelada Airport crashed in the jungle, during a night approach, due to unknown causes, approximately 45 km from Manaus at the location of Paraná da Eva. All 50 passengers and crew died.
- 8 October 1969: a Cruzeiro do Sul Sud Aviation SE-210 Caravelle VI R en route from Belém-Val de Cans to Ponta Pelada Airport was hijacked by 4 persons who demanded to be flown to Cuba. The hijack lasted less than a day and there were no victims.
- 12 November 1969: a Cruzeiro do Sul NAMC YS-11/11A en route from Ponta Pelada Airport to Belém-Val de Cans was hijacked by a person who demanded to be flown to Cuba. There were no victims.
- 25 April 1970: a VASP Boeing 737-2A1 en route from Brasília to Ponta Pelada Airport was hijacked by a person who demanded to be flown to Cuba. The hijack lasted a day.
- 14 May 1970: a VASP Boeing 737-2A1 en route from Brasília to Ponta Pelada Airport was hijacked by a person who demanded to be flown to Cuba. The hijack lasted a day.

== Access ==
The airport is located 9 km (6 mi) from downtown Manaus.

== See also ==
- Manaus Air Force Base
- List of airports in Brazil
