= Manaus Air Force Base =

Air base of the Brazilian Air Force

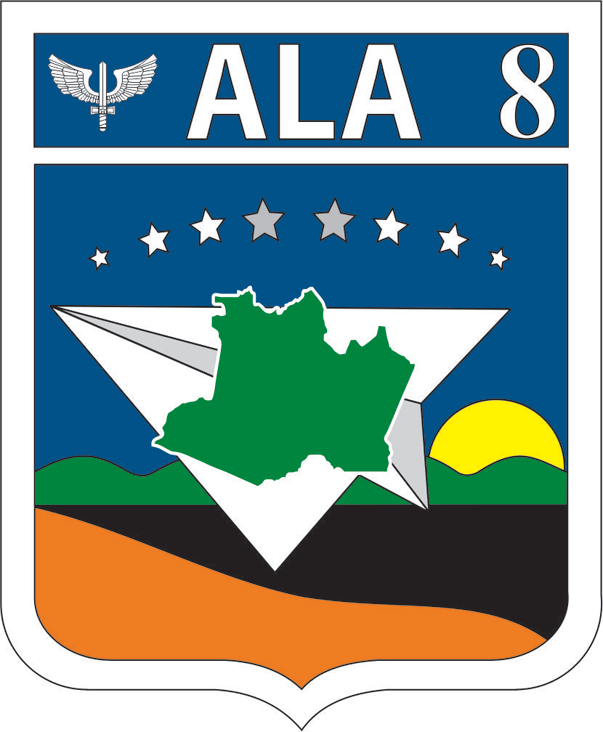
Manaus Air Force Base
- Base Aérea de Manaus
- Manaus, Amazonas in Brazil
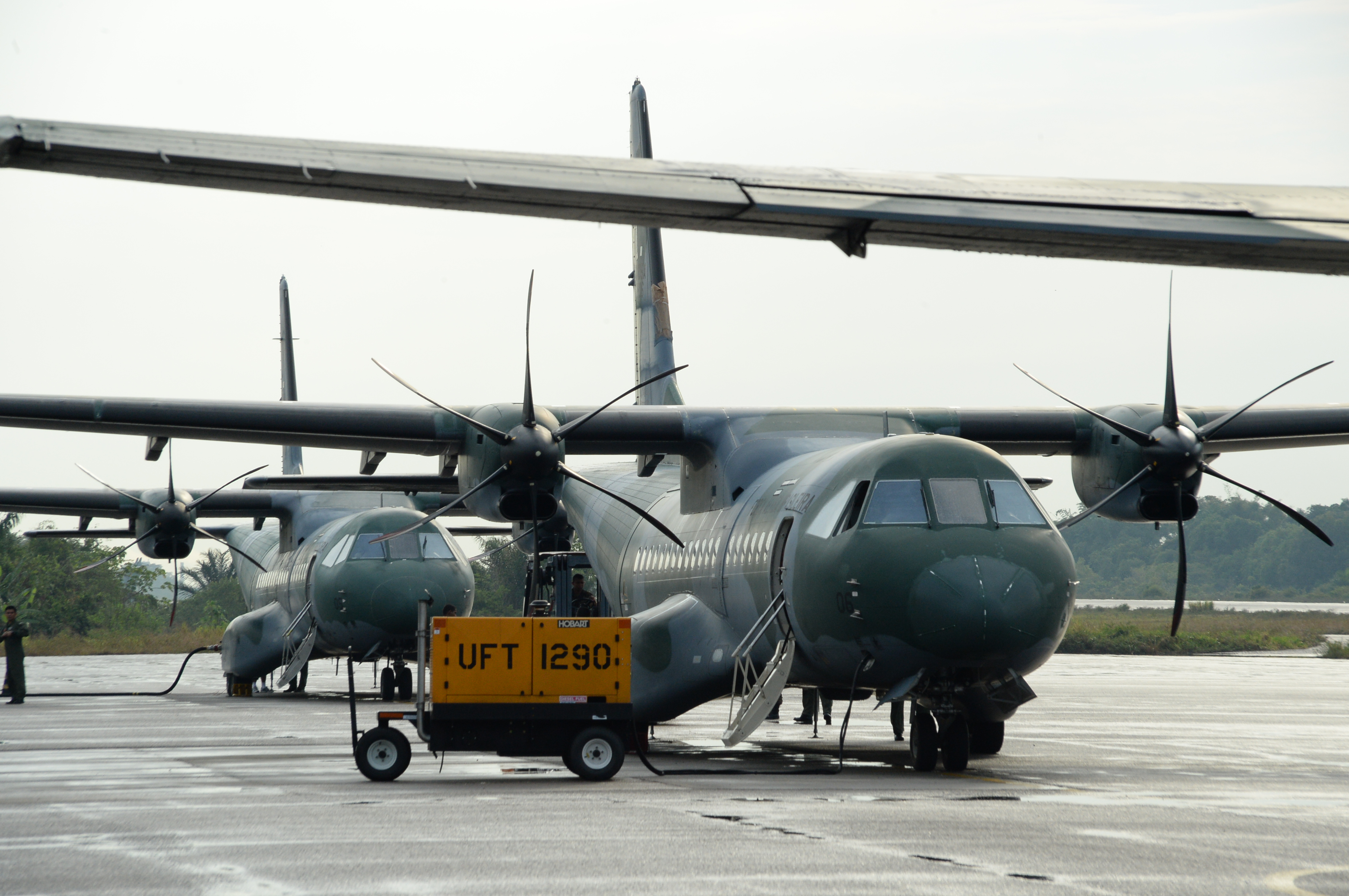
- Two C-105A Amazonas at Manaus in 2014

Site information
- Type: Air Force Base
- Code: ALA8
- Owner: Brazilian Air Force
- Controlled by: Brazilian Air Force
- Open to the public: No
- Website: fab.mil.br/organizacoes/mostra/457

Location
- Location in Brazil
- Coordinates: 03°08′45″S 059°59′06″W

Site history
- Built: 1954
- In use: 1970-present

Garrison information
- Current commander: Cel. Av. Luiz Ângelo de Andrade Pinheiro Borges
- Occupants: 7th Squadron of the 8th Aviation Group; 1st Squadron of the 9th Transportation Group; 7th Squadron of Air Transportation; 4th Aviation Battalion Brazilian Army

Airfield information
- Identifiers: IATA: PLL, ICAO: SBAN, LID: AM9001
- Elevation: 78 metres (256 ft) AMSL
Runways
Direction	Length and surface
09/27	2,042 metres (6,699 ft) Asphalt

Manaus Air Force Base – ALA8 (IATA: PLL, ICAO: SBMN) is a base of the Brazilian Air Force, located in Manaus, Amazonas.

== History ==
The base was created in 1970, and between 1970 and 1976 public facilities of Ponta Pelada Airport were shared with the military facilities of Manaus Air Force Base. In 1976, with the opening of Eduardo Gomes International Airport, all public operations were transferred to the new airport. Ponta Pelada Airport was then renamed Manaus Air Force Base and since then it handles exclusively military operations.

== Units ==
The following units are based at Manaus Air Force Base:

- 7th Squadron of the 8th Aviation Group (7°/8°GAv) Hárpia, using the H-60L Black Hawk.
- 1st Squadron of the 9th Aviation Group (1°/9°GAv) Arara, using the C-105A Amazonas.
- 7th Squadron of Air Transportation (7°ETA) Cobra, using the C-97 Brasília, and the C-98A Grand Caravan.
- 4th Aviation Battalion of the Brazilian Army (4° BAvEx) Batalhão Coronel Ricardo Pavanello, using HM-1 Pantera, HM-2 Black Hawk, and HM-4 Jaguar.

== Accidents and incidents ==
- 28 April 1971: Brazilian Air Force, a Douglas DC-6B registration FAB-2414 en route from Manaus to Rio de Janeiro had problems with engine vibrations which forced the crew to return to Manaus. On the ground one of the right hand engines burst into flames. The fire spread to the fuselage causing the death of 16 of the 83 occupants.
- 23 February 1973: Brazilian Air Force, a de Havilland Canada DHC-5 Buffalo registration FAB-2372 crashed on landing killing 3 occupants.

== Access ==
The base is located 9 km from downtown Manaus.

== Gallery ==
This gallery displays aircraft that are or have been based at Manaus. The gallery is not comprehensive.

=== Present aircraft ===
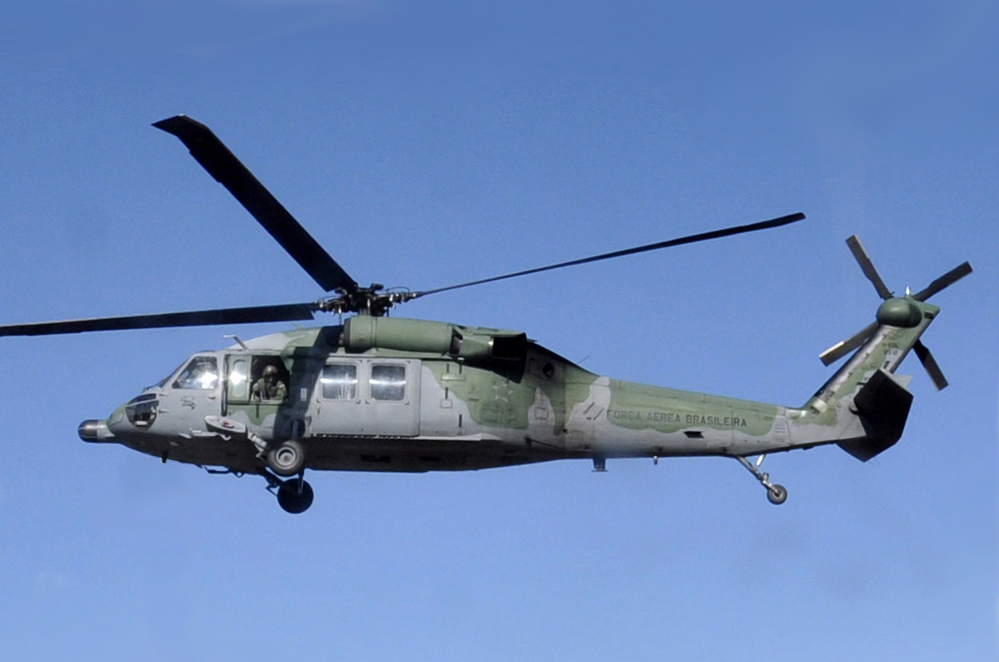
Sikorsky H-60L Black Hawk (FAB)

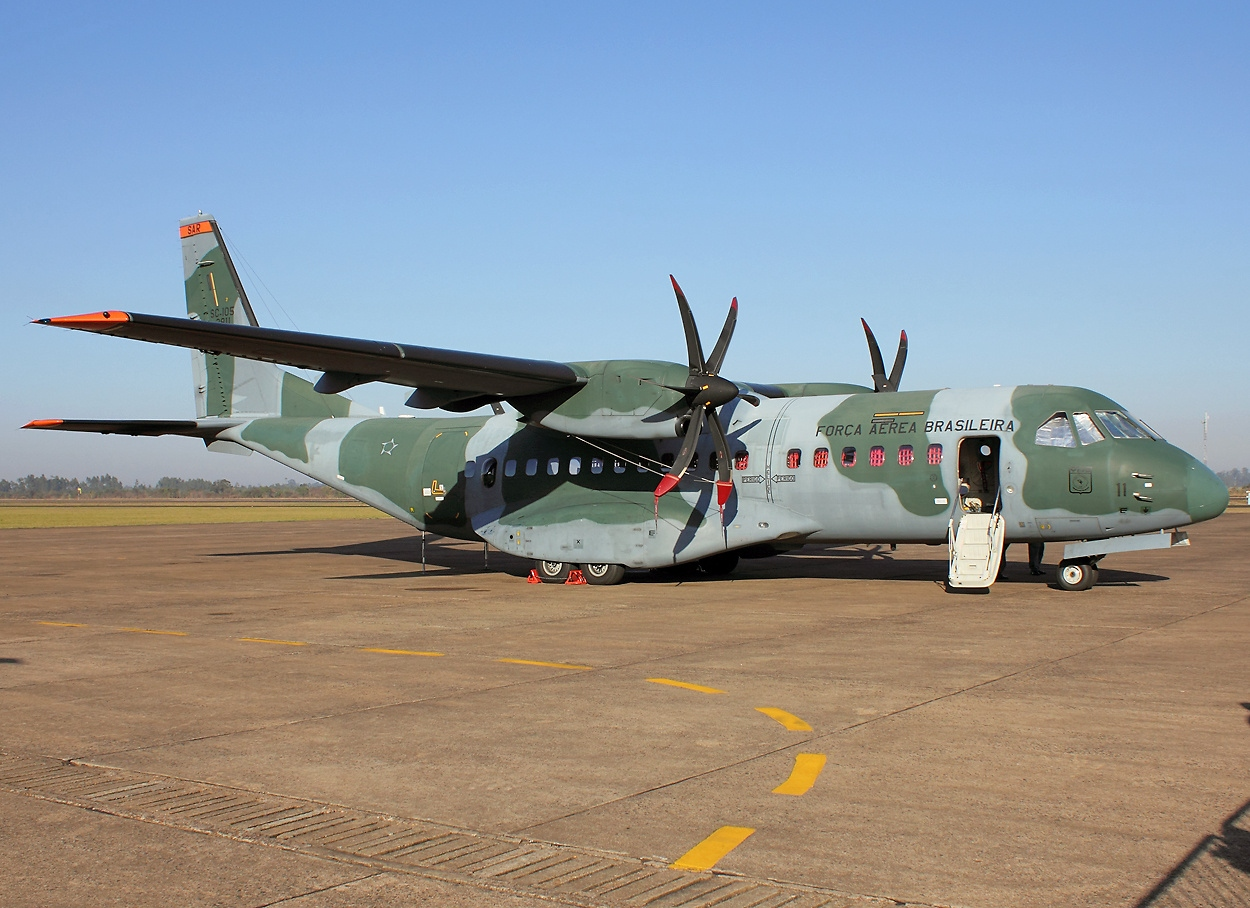
CASA C-105A Amazonas (FAB)

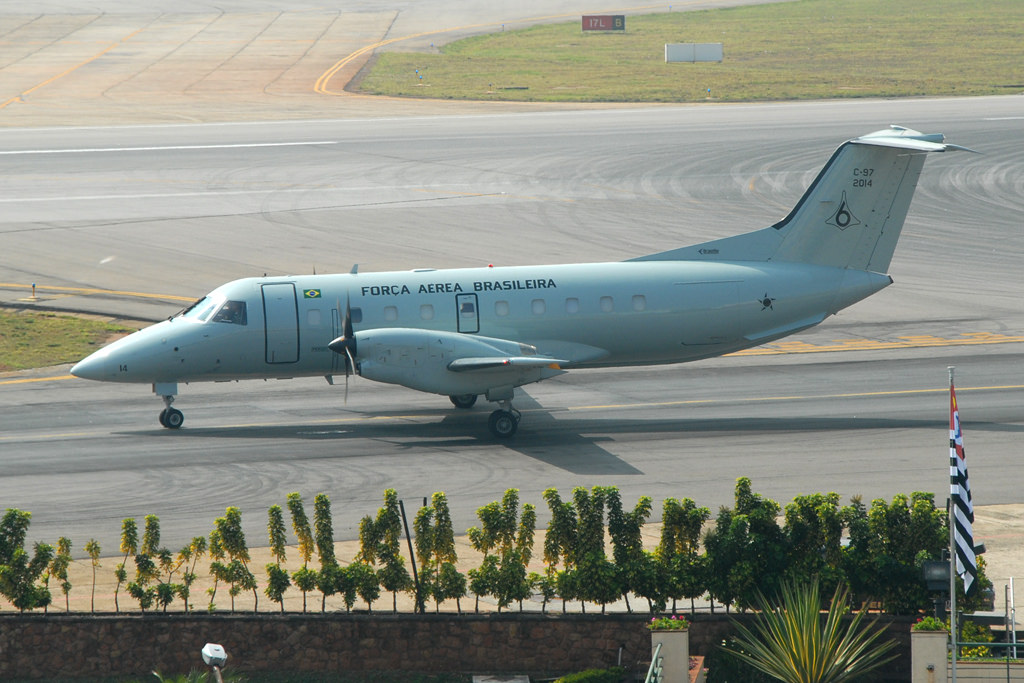
Embraer C-97 Brasília (FAB)

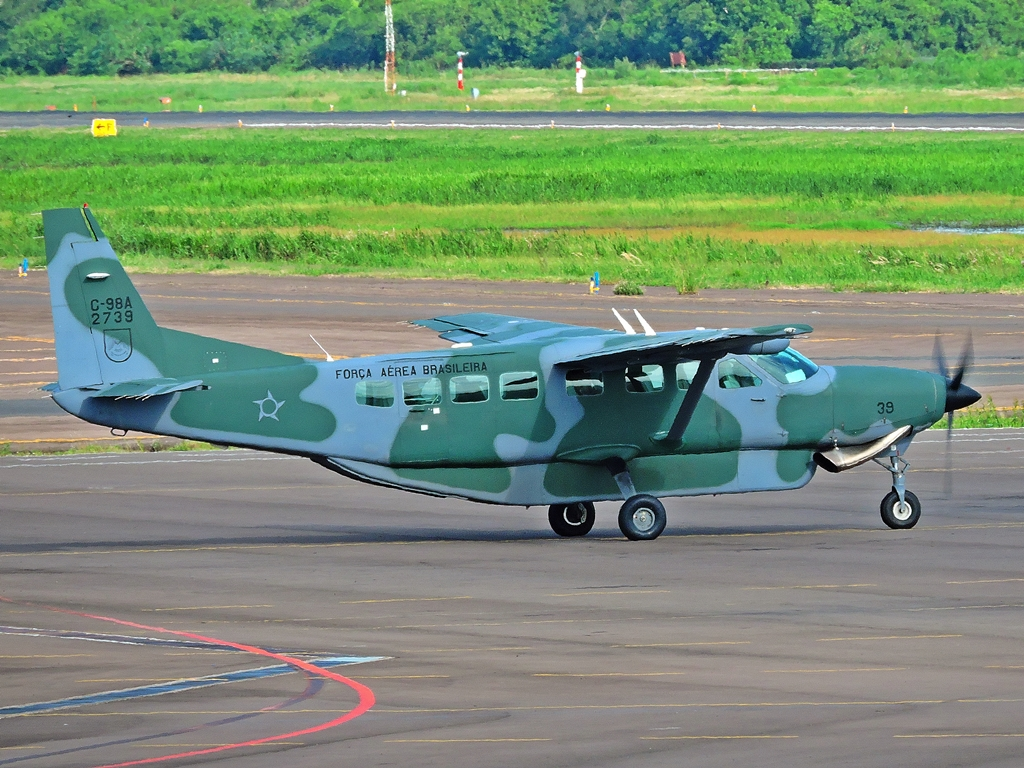
Cessna C-98A Caravan (FAB)

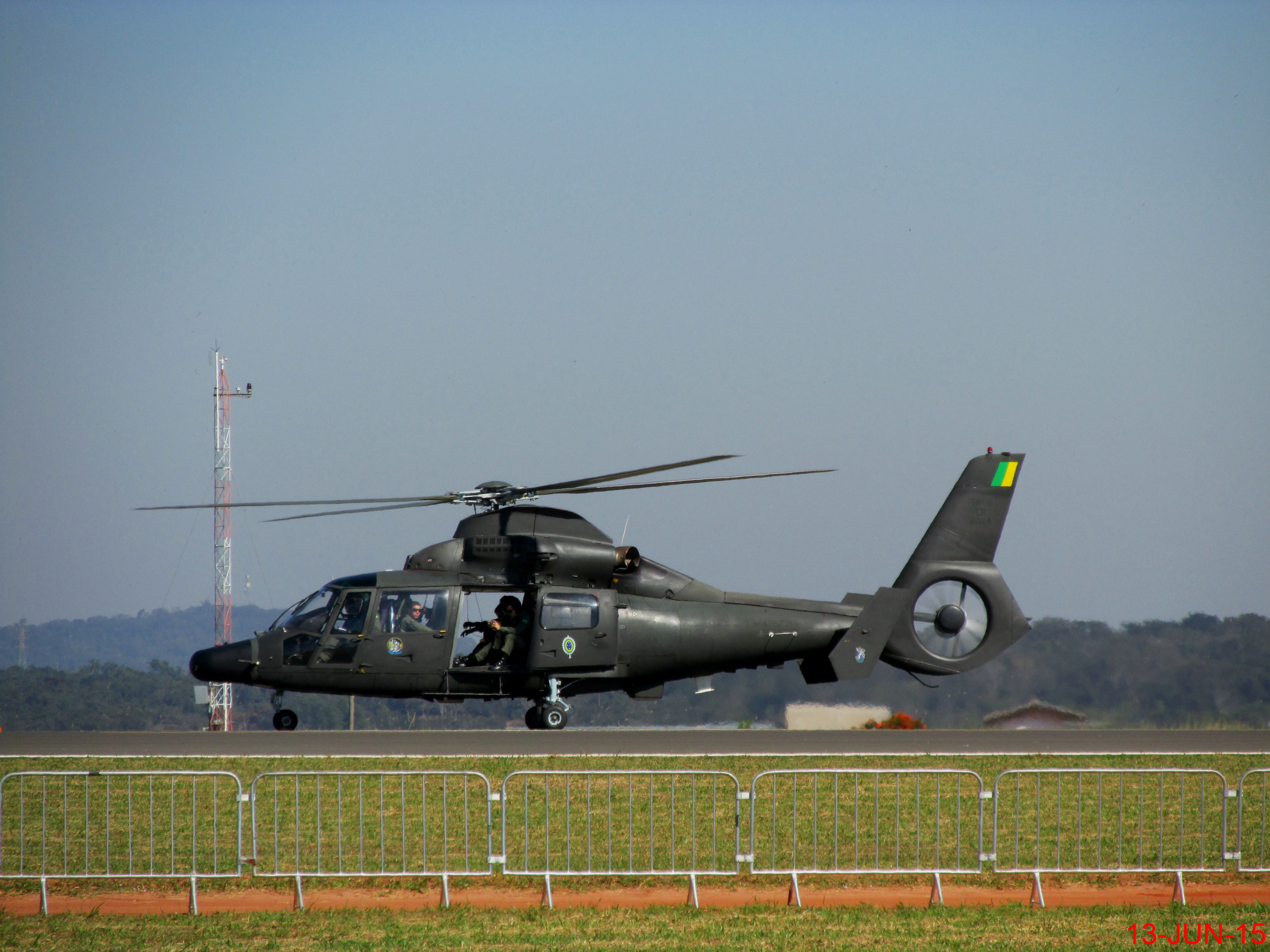
Eurocopter HM-1 Pantera (Army)

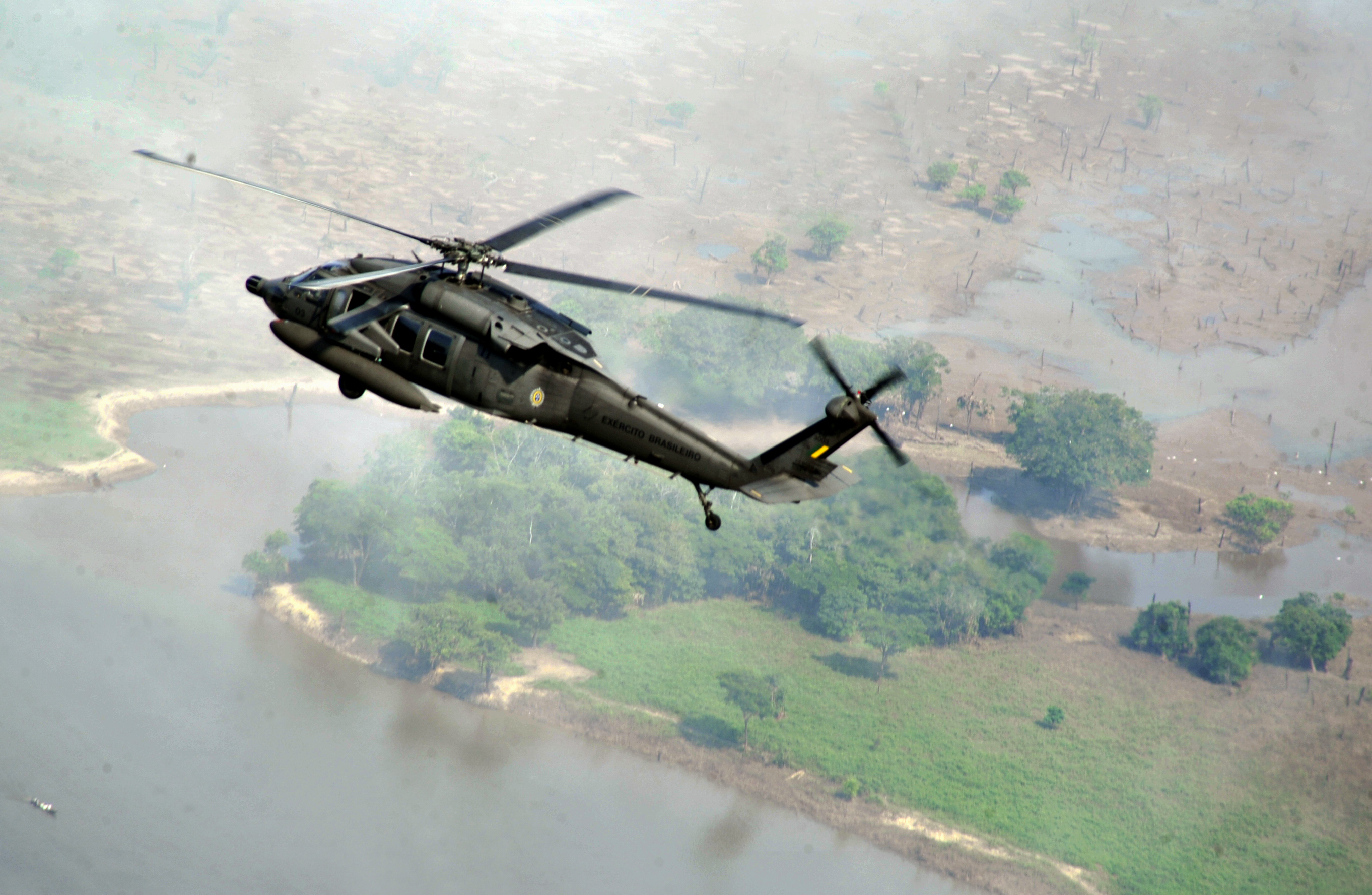
Sikorsky HM-2 Black Hawk (Army)

=== Retired aircraft ===
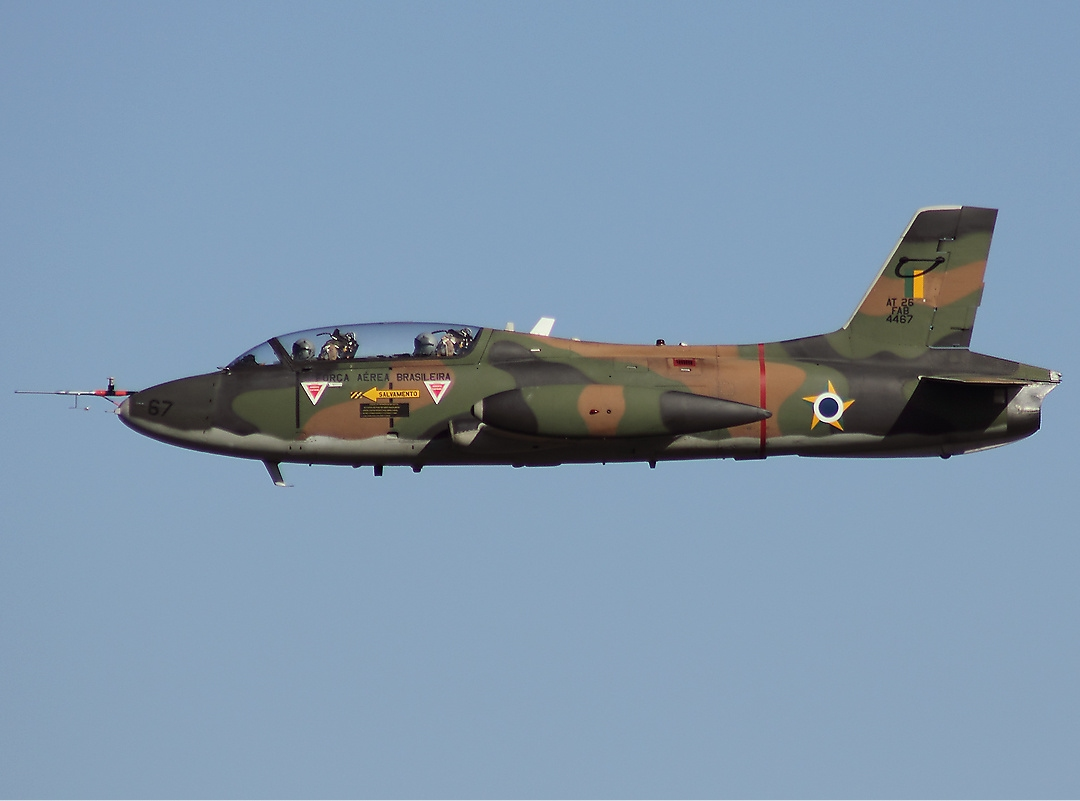
Embraer AT-26 Xavante (FAB)

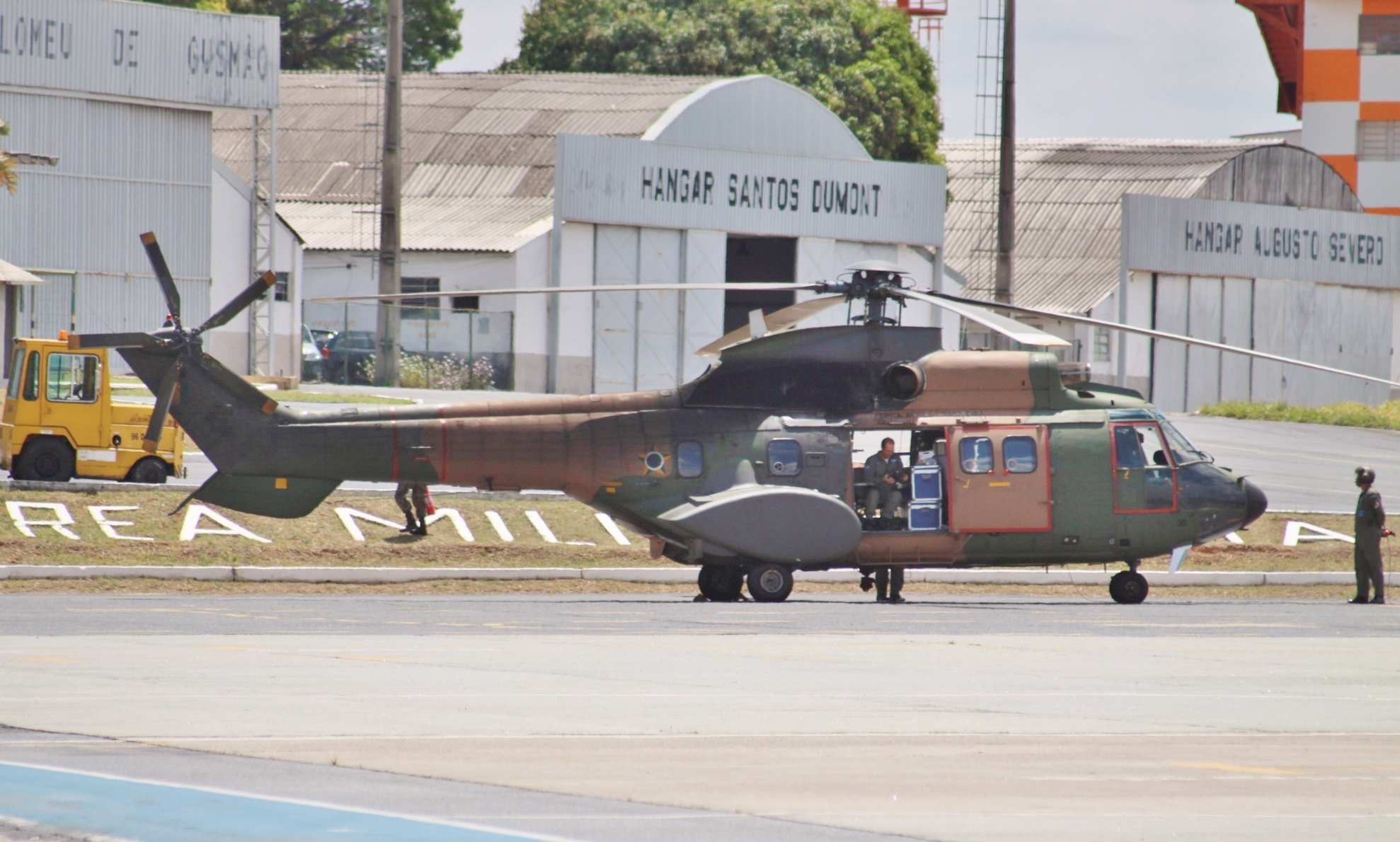
Helibras H-34 Super Puma (FAB)

de Havilland C-115 Buffalo (FAB)

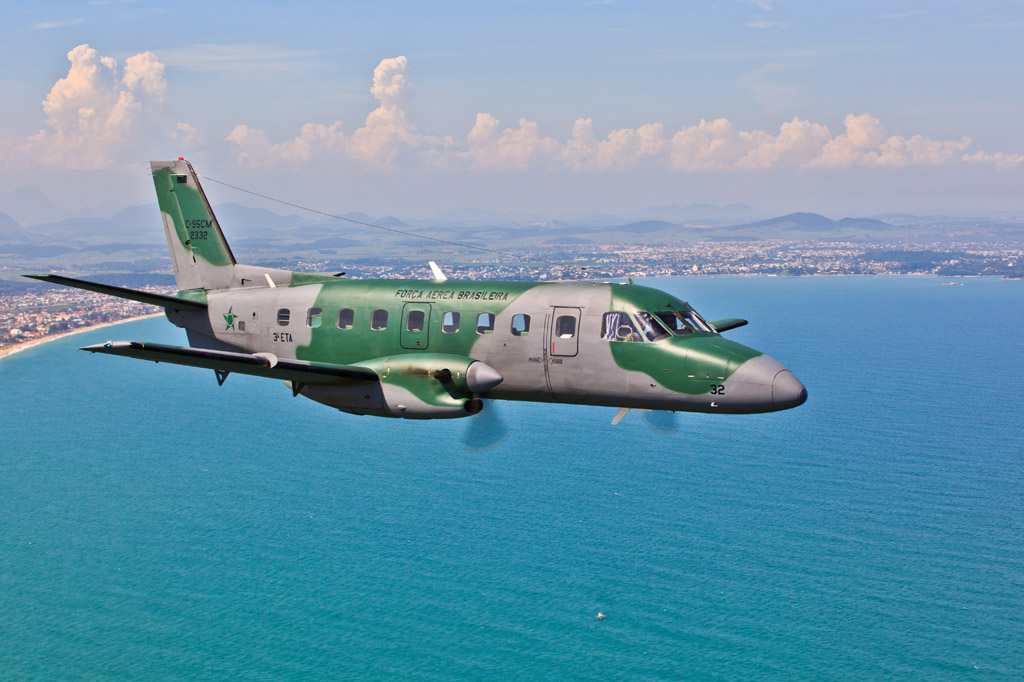
Embraer C-95B Bandeirante (FAB)

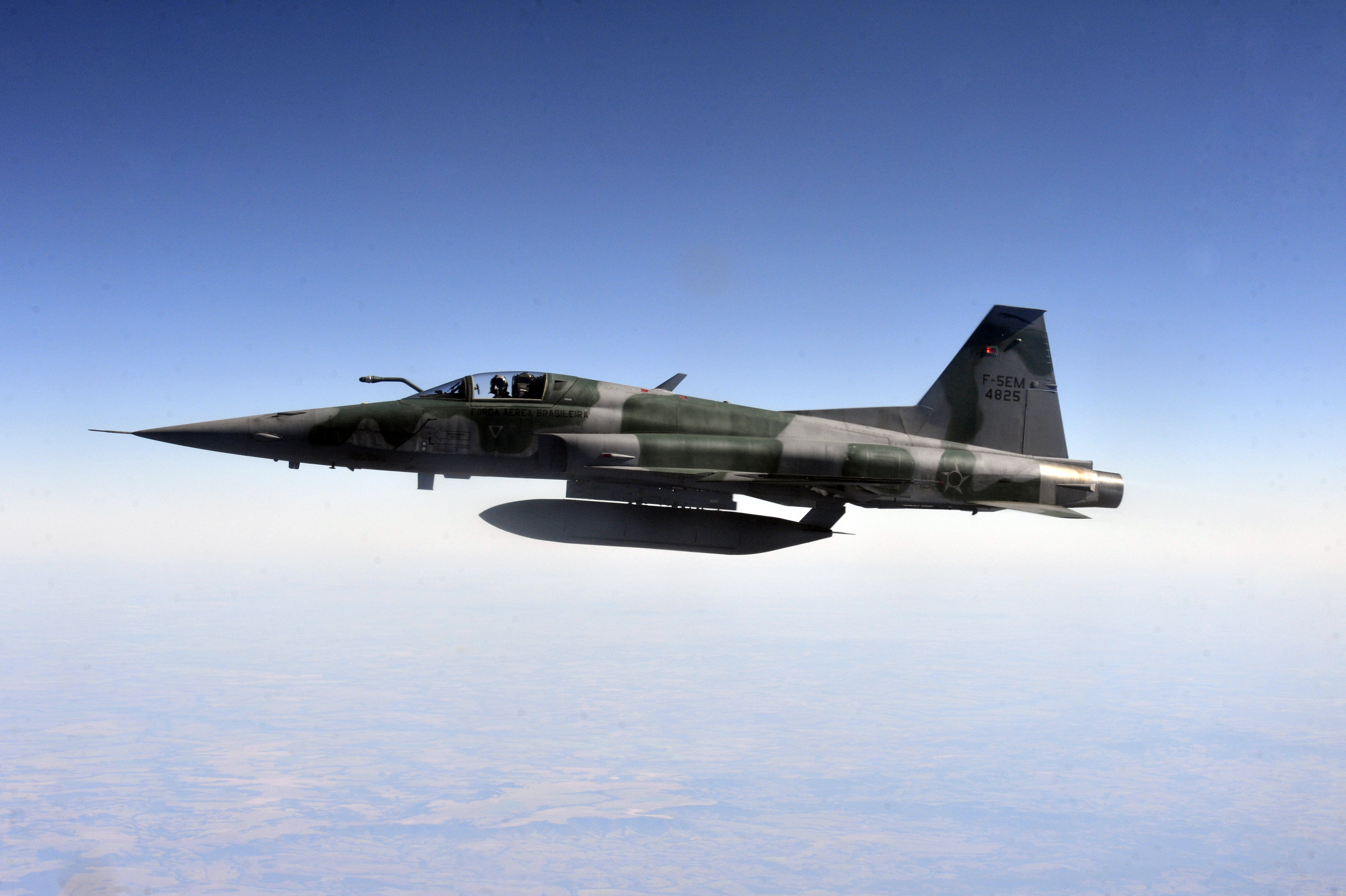
Northrop F-5EM (FAB)

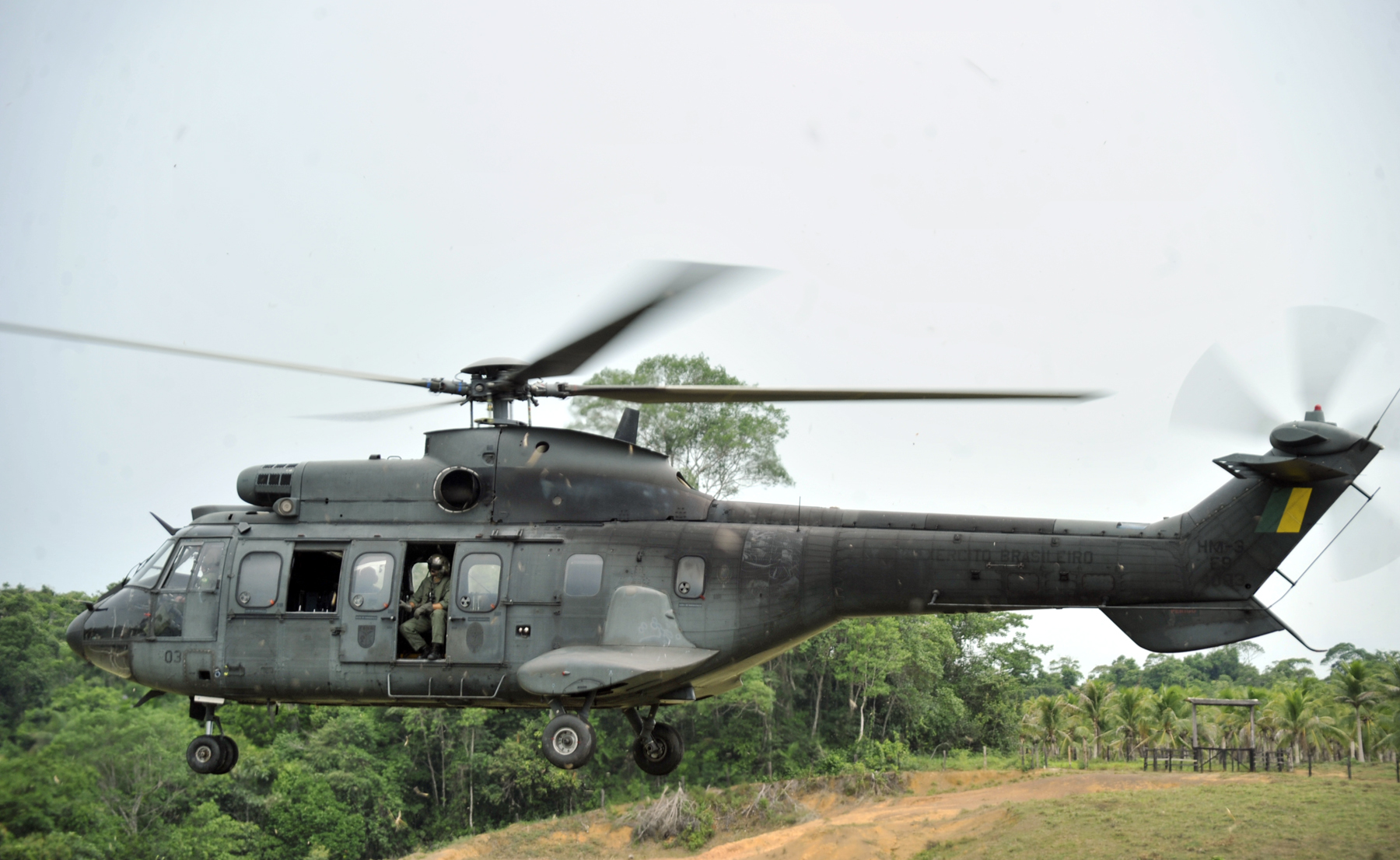
Eurocopter HM-3 Cougar (Army)

== See also ==
- List of Brazilian military bases
- Ponta Pelada Airport
