= Voo da Amizade =

Voo da amizade (Portuguese: Friendship Flight) was the name of a dedicated air service between Brazil and Portugal operated between 1960 and 1967. It was an operational partnership between the Portuguese TAP Transportes Aéreos Portugueses and the Brazilian Panair do Brasil (1960–1965) and Varig (1965–1967).

== History ==
In order to further promote the close cultural and economic ties between Brazil and Portugal, Panair do Brasil and TAP-Transportes Aéreos Portugueses established a jointly-operated air service with very specific characteristics:

- Tickets for this flight were much cheaper than normal tickets but could be purchased only by Brazilian and Portuguese citizens or foreigners with permanent residence in one of those two countries.
- Flights were initially operated once a week by a dedicated Panair do Brasil Douglas DC-7C with the titles Panair and TAP on the fuselage, with crew of both airlines, and with TAP flight numbers. By August 1961 frequencies had increased to 2 flights a week, one for each airline, and by August 1962 there were three weekly frequencies, with two for Panair and one for TAP. However, in May 1964 frequencies returned to the 1961 arrangement. During all this time the service was operated by a Panair aircraft configured in all-economy class.
- The routing was Rio de Janeiro-Galeão / Recife / Sal / Lisbon. Some flights also stopped at São Paulo-Congonhas. Since at the time Cape Verde, where the island of Sal is located, was a Portuguese Overseas Province, the whole flight was operated within the territories of Brazil and Portugal.
- Meals were served in airport restaurants during the refueling stops. Each passenger had a baggage allowance of 20 kg.

The first flight took off from Brazil on November 30, 1960 and remained as originally planned until the closure of Panair do Brasil on February 10, 1965. After a brief interruption, on November 22, 1965 Varig succeeded Panair in the Brazilian half of the operation, using one of its Lockheed L-188 Electra II. In this phase, TAP also decided to start using its own aircraft, a Lockheed L-1049G Super Constellation, for its share of the services. Thus, each airline had one weekly frequency and operated its own equipment. Flights ended in 1967.

It is worth noting that Panair, TAP and Varig also operated nonstop flights between Brazil and Portugal without the restrictions imposed by the Voo da amizade. For these, from 1960 to 1965 Panair used its Douglas DC-8-33, and from 1966 onwards TAP used its Boeing 707 and Varig either a Boeing 707 or a Douglas DC-8-33.

== Accident ==
- 1 November 1961: the Panair do Brasil Douglas DC-7C registration PP-PDO flying southbound from Sal to Recife during its final approach at Recife, struck an 84 m hill 2.7 km from the runway and broke up. The aircraft was doing a night approach too low and outside the regular traffic pattern. From a total of 88 passengers and crew, 45 died.
