= Flight 302 =

Flight 302 may refer to:

Listed chronologically

- Cruzeiro do Sul Flight 302, hijacked on 3 February 1984
- Aeroflot Flight 302, crashed on 16 February 1966
- AeroUnion Flight 302, crashed on 13 April 2010
- Ethiopian Airlines Flight 302, crashed on 10 March 2019
