= Serviços Aéreos Cruzeiro do Sul =

1927–1993 Brazilian airline

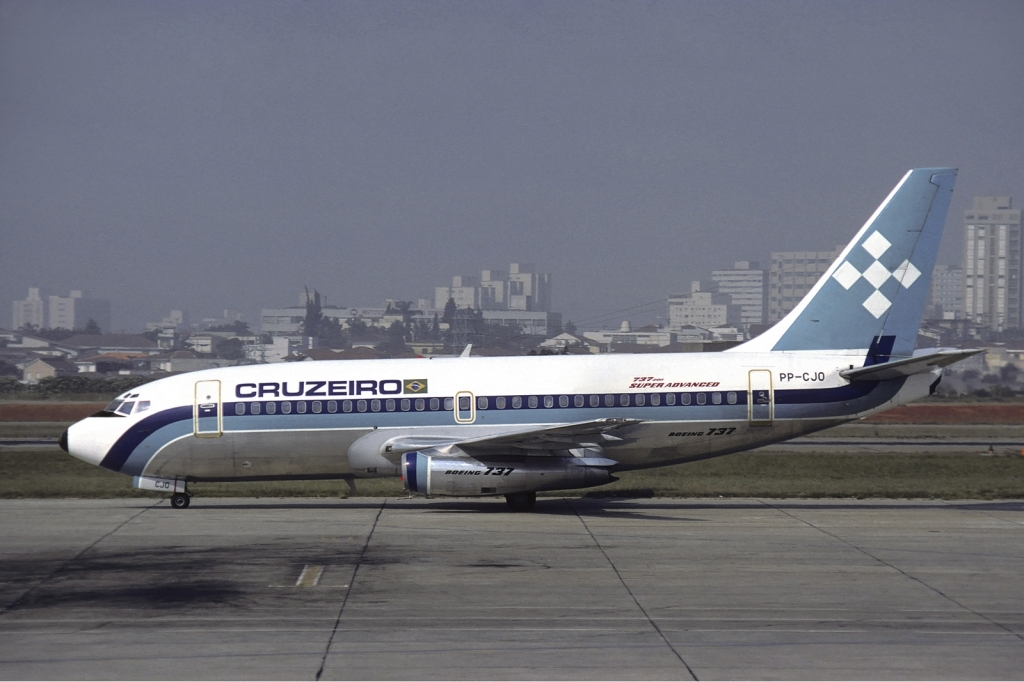
IATA	ICAO	Call sign
SC	CRZ	CRUZEIRO
- Founded: 1927 as Syndicato Condor
- Commenced operations: 1928
- Ceased operations: 1993
- Parent company: Varig
- Headquarters: Rio de Janeiro, Brazil
- Key people: Fritz W. Hammer (1927–1930); Paul Moosmeyer (1930–1942); José Bento Ribeiro Dantas (1942–1969); Leopoldino Cardoso de Amorim Filho (1969–1993)

Serviços Aéreos Cruzeiro do Sul (lit. 'Southern Cross Air Services') was the second oldest airline of Brazil, tracing its origins to 1927 when it was founded as Syndicato Condor, a subsidiary of Deutsche Luft Hansa. Syndicato Condor retained rights and interests of a former German trade company, Condor Syndikat, which previously operated passenger and mail services in Brazil. It was renamed Serviços Aéreos Cruzeiro do Sul in 1943. In 1975, Varig, a Brazilian airline which shared very similar origins, acquired its controlling shares. In 1993, it was finally merged into Varig.

== History ==
=== Syndicato Condor and Serviços Aéreos Condor (1927–1943) ===
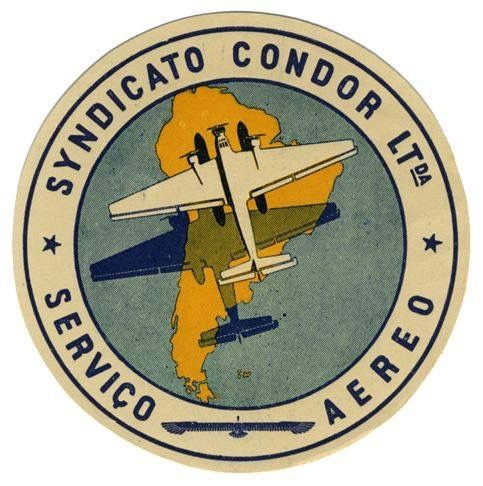

The first phase in the history of Cruzeiro do Sul is related to the German influence and can be dated from 1927 until 1943. During this time the airline was called Syndicato Condor, then Sindicato Condor and finally Serviços Aéreos Condor. Condor was founded in Rio de Janeiro, on 1 December 1927, by the three former German directors of Condor Syndikat, including Fritz W. Hammer, and the Brazilian Count Pereira Carneiro, owner of Jornal do Brasil and a shipping company. Syndicato Condor is considered to be the heir of Condor Syndikat, a German trade company that operated air services within Brazil and from which it inherited equipment, concessions, rights and particular interests. From the start it had a strong German influence, operating German aircraft and supporting the interests of Deutsche Luft Hansa in South America. The Brazilian government recognized it as an airline on 20 January 1928, granting rights to operate in the whole Brazilian territory and to extend services to Uruguay and Argentina. Those services were of utmost importance for the future plans of the mother-company Deutsche Luft Hansa in South America. In fact, between 1 June 1927, when Condor Syndikat ceased to exist, and the foundation of Syndicato Condor, services were never interrupted.

Seaplane services from Rio de Janeiro to Porto Alegre with intermediate stops that had been operating on an informal basis became official began almost immediately. It consisted of a twice-weekly flight, operated with a seaplane Junkers G-24 and took two days with an overnight stop. On 14 April 1934, the route was extended to include Montevideo and Buenos Aires and on 28 September 1935, it reached Mendoza and Santiago de Chile. Those services were eventually upgraded to the modern Junkers Ju 52 and later the sophisticated Focke-Wulf Fw 200 Condor aircraft.

On 15 July 1928, a new service from Rio de Janeiro to Salvador via Belmonte and Ilhéus, operated with a seaplane Junkers F-13, was inaugurated. Less than two years later, the route would be modified to include Vitória, Caravelas, Belmonte and Ilhéus and extended from Salvador to Maceió, Recife, Parahyba (now João Pessoa) and Natal. In December 1935, the service was further extended to Fortaleza; in April 1936, it reached Belém. The trip from Rio de Janeiro to Belém took two days with an overnight stop in Recife.

On 8 September 1933, Condor established services between Rio de Janeiro, São Paulo, Corumbá and Cuiabá. This service was a major break-through because previously an overland journey to Mato Grosso took several days. In 1936, Condor made an interline agreement with Lloyd Aéreo Boliviano – LAB and established an international connection to the main cities of Bolivia, particularly Puerto Suárez, Santa Cruz de la Sierra, Cochabamba, and La Paz, using Corumbá as connecting point. The aircraft of Condor and LAB met in Corumbá during the overnight stop and exchanged passengers. Later, in Brazil, Condor extended its services beyond Cuiabá, reaching Porto Velho, Rio Branco and Cruzeiro do Sul.

Therefore, by 1936 Syndicato Condor had established two trunk routes with increasing frequencies: Belém/Rio de Janeiro/Porto Alegre/Montevideo/Buenos Aires/Santiago and São Paulo/Corumbá/Cuiabá, with connecting services to Bolivia. Condor was thus able to face the fierce competition imposed by Panair do Brasil, the Brazilian subsidiary of Pan American. Condor had however one great advantage: it had better aircraft which could operate both as seaplanes and land-planes, and not only as seaplanes as did Panair do Brasil. Condor was then not restricted to navigate following the coast or rivers.

As part of the project of Deutsche Luft Hansa to establish direct mail and passenger services to South America and in competition with the French Aéropostale which had been providing such services since 1927, Condor and Luft Hansa jointly operated a service that involved the use of rigid airships and aircraft. Between 1931 and 1937, while Condor's aircraft provided connecting services in Brazil and to Uruguay, Argentina, and later Chile and Bolivia for the Luft Hansa passengers, Luft Hansa operated services using the Graf Zeppelin or the Hindenburg flying between Friedrichshafen, Natal and Recife in three days. The journey continued to Rio de Janeiro and was completed in another two days. Passengers could leave in any of the Brazilian ports-of-call and continue in Condor's aircraft and vice versa. In Rio de Janeiro, a custom-made facility was built to accommodate the airships. It was called Bartolomeu de Gusmão Airport. However, in 1941, it was taken over by the Brazilian Air Force and renamed Santa Cruz Air Force Base. It remains one of the most important bases of the Brazilian Air Force. The hangar of the airships is still standing and in perfect condition.

1944 network map

Administratively, Fritz Hammer left the company in September 1930 and another German citizen, Paul Moosmeyer, took the office of General Director. He held the position until 1942.

On 19 August 1941, Syndicato Condor officially changed its name to Serviços Aéreos Condor because of a legal technicality. The same year, as the United States joined the Allies in fighting World War II, supplies became scarce, particularly in terms of petrol and replacement parts. Because it used German equipment, Condor faced particular difficulties. The situation got worse on 22 August 1942, as Brazil declared war against the Axis and joined the Allies in the conflict. Since Condor was still controlled by the German state-owned airline Deutsche Lufthansa and had a majority of German directors, the Brazilian government, particularly President Getúlio Vargas decided to nationalize Condor. Such act happened on 25 August 1942, and all German (natural, descendants and Brazilian naturalized) directors were replaced by Brazilian citizens. In fact the personnel with German descent were persecuted.

On 16 January 1943, following a complete administrative reorganization, which attempted to erase its German culture and identity, Condor had its name changed to Serviços Aéreos Cruzeiro do Sul. This change marks the beginning of a new phase in the life of the airline or more realistically a new airline born from the ashes of made-defunct Condor.

=== Serviços Aéreos Cruzeiro do Sul (1943–1975) ===
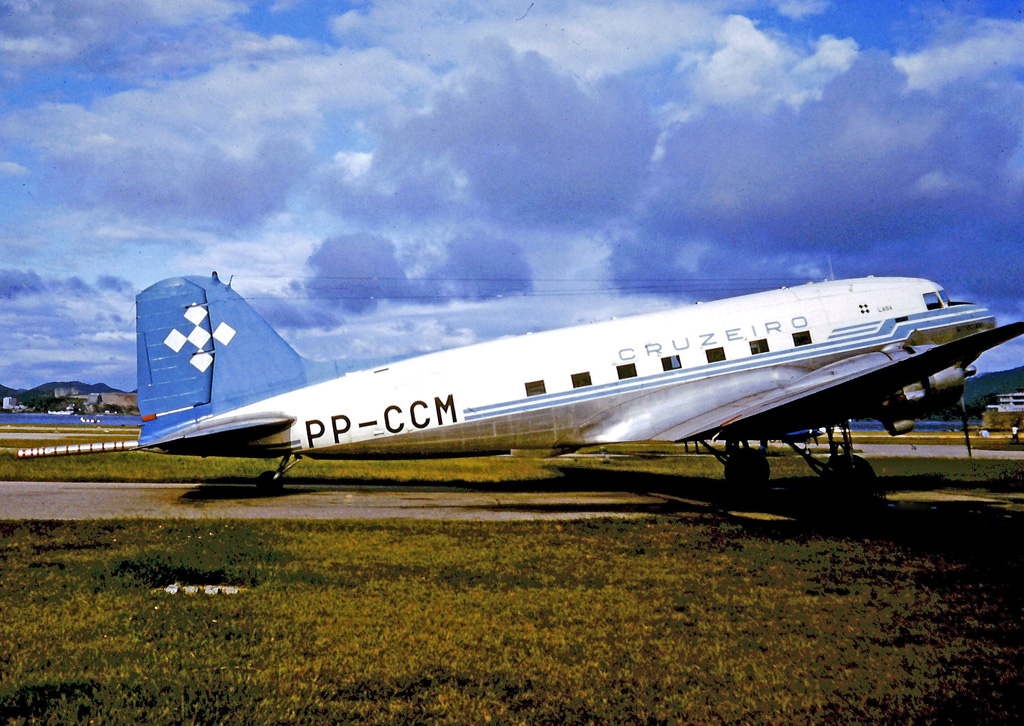
A Douglas C-47A (DC-3) at Rio Santos Dumont Airport in 1975

The nationalization and the new name mark the beginning of the second phase, which lasted until 1975. Nationalized, most of its operational problems were solved as Cruzeiro got petrol on loan from the Air Force Ministry. However, problems with the German aircraft and acquisition of spare parts for maintenance persisted. For this reason, Cruzeiro do Sul started a gradual replacement of its German aircraft for aircraft manufactured in the United States, mostly war surplus. The work-horse Junkers Ju 52s were replaced by Douglas DC-3s. The first one arrived on 24 September 1943 and by 1953 Cruzeiro had a fleet of 38 such aircraft flying.

Cruzeiro participated in the war effort by transporting material and troops along the Brazilian coast, and rubber from the Amazon region.

With the end of the war, Cruzeiro opened new services, competing with Panair do Brasil and Varig. Varig greatly increased its operations beyond the states of Rio Grande do Sul and Santa Catarina where it was the dominating carrier. In response, Cruzeiro bought two airlines that operated in the area and increased its participation in this regional market. They were SAVAG – Sociedade Anônima Viação Aérea Gaúcha and TAC – Transportes Aéreos Catarinense. Cruzeiro also opened new routes from Rio de Janeiro to Belém following the Araguaia and Tocantins rivers, and opened new connections to Manaus via Santarém in direct competition with Panair do Brasil. Furthermore, the route to Manaus was extended to Boa Vista and Georgetown and the line to Belém extended to Cayenne and Paramaribo. Services to Buenos Aires, Montevideo and Santiago de Chile were maintained.

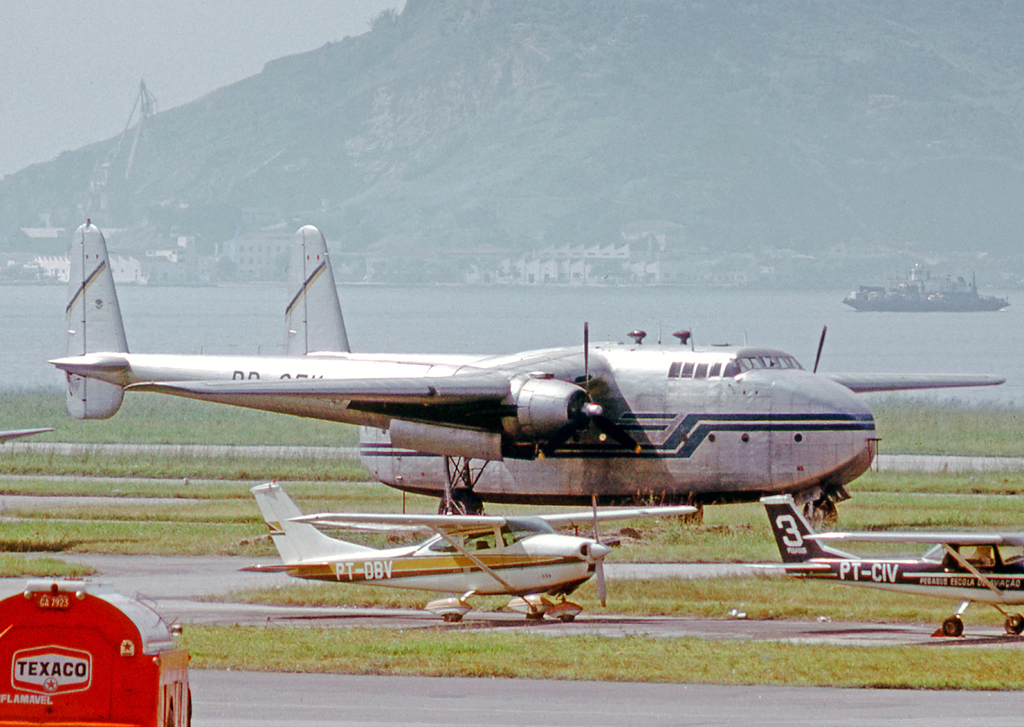
Fairchild Packet C-82A freighter at Santos Dumont Airport Rio de Janeiro in May 1972

On 2 October 1947, Serviços Aéreos Cruzeiro do Sul was chosen by the Brazilian government to be the second Brazilian airline authorized to fly to the United States, following a concession already granted to and operated by Aerovias Brasil. Cruzeiro could serve San Juan de Puerto Rico, Washington, D.C., and New York City. In order to operate those services, Cruzeiro bought three Douglas DC-4s and operated 30 experimental flights between 1948 and 1949. However, those services were dropped in 1949 due to lack of financial and other assistance from the Brazilian government. The Douglas DC-4s were sold and the money was used to buy four new Convair CV-340s. The concession to fly to the United States was revoked and granted to Varig.

On 6 July 1959, Cruzeiro, Varig and VASP initiated the air shuttle services between Rio de Janeiro-Santos Dumont and São Paulo-Congonhas airports, the first of its kind in the world. The three companies coordinated their schedules, operations, and shared revenue. The service was a direct response to the competition imposed by Real Transportes Aéreos. The idea, baptized as Air bridge (Ponte Aérea in Portuguese), inspired on the Berlin Airlift was so successful that it was abandoned only in 1999. Flights operated on an hourly basis initially by Convair 240 (Varig), Convair 340 (Cruzeiro) and Saab 90 Scandia (VASP). In a matter of a few months the shuttle service led by Varig won the battle against Real, which was anyway bought by Varig in 1961. Sadia Transportes Aéreos joined the service in 1968. Between 1975 and 1992 it was operated exclusively by Varig's Lockheed L-188 Electra which for sometime and for the sake of neutrality did not have the name Varig on the fuselage.

Cruzeiro management gave up the idea of operating long-distance flights and concentrated its efforts in creating an extensive domestic and regional network, in which flights to Bolivia, Paraguay, Peru, Ecuador and Venezuela were added. In January 1963, Cruzeiro entered the jet age when the operations with the SE.210 Caravelle started. Cruzeiro bought four of such aircraft. Following the closure of Panair do Brasil in 1965, Cruzeiro received another three of its Caravelles as well as three Consolidated Catalinas.

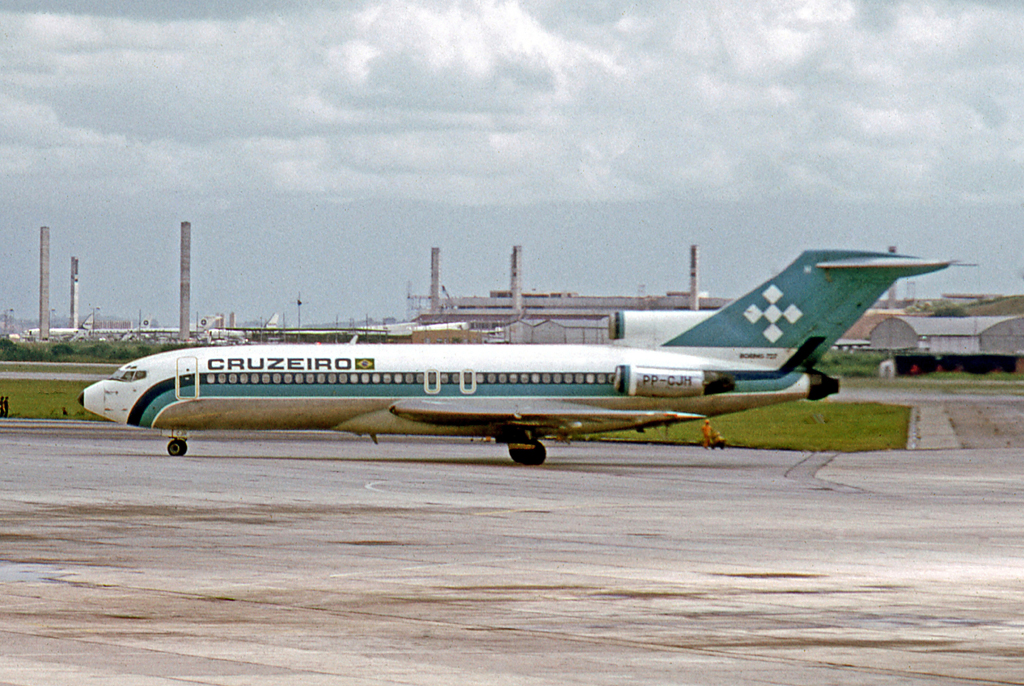
A Boeing 727-193 at Rio de Janeiro International airport in 1975.

On 3 January 1971, the first of four Boeing 727-100s entered into service and put to operate the trunk route Buenos Aires–Rio de Janeiro–Brasília. In 1975 the first Boeing 737-200 entered into service.

As a consequence of serious economic difficulties, on 22 May 1975 Serviços Aéreos Cruzeiro do Sul was bought by Ruben Berta Foundation, the institution that also controlled Varig. That day Cruzeiro lost its independence and started to operate with Varig as a consortium, with Varig being the leading partner.

=== Varig Ownership (1975–1993) ===
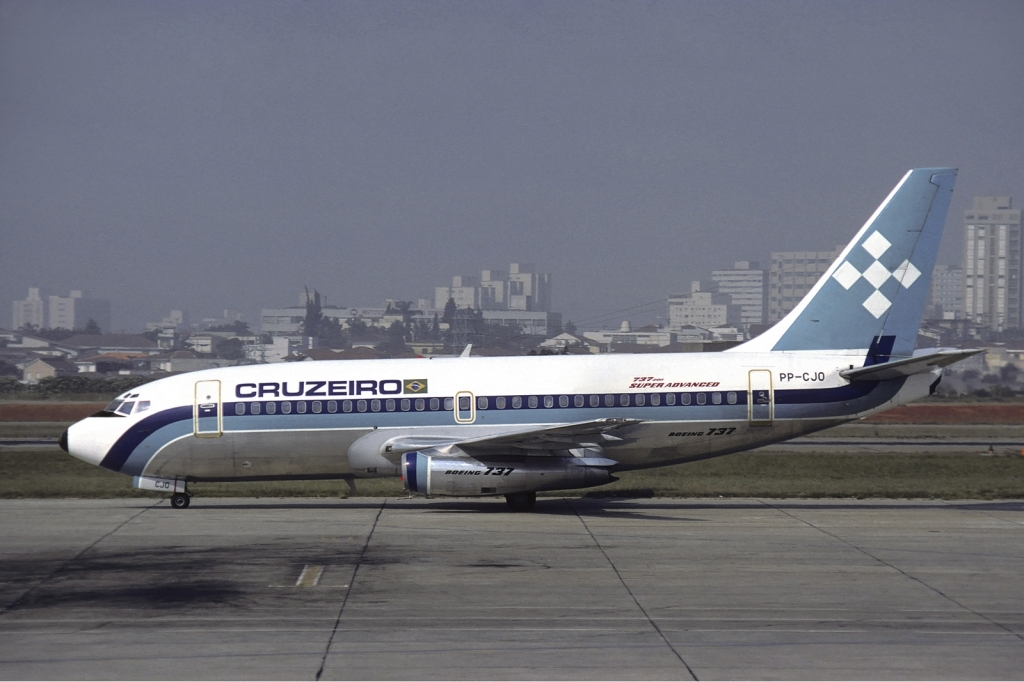
Boeing 737-200 in 1977.

On 22 May 1975 begins the third phase, when Ruben Berta Foundation, the owner of Varig acquired a majority of shares in Cruzeiro do Sul. Although Varig and Cruzeiro do Sul were kept as separate companies operating as a consortium, in reality frequencies and fleets were integrated and rationalized in order to avoid duplication of services. Since in 1975 there had been only 4 national airlines operating in Brazil (Varig, Cruzeiro, Vasp and Transbrasil) and the market was rigidly regulated, the government allocated a maximum of 45% of the market share to the consortium Varig/Cruzeiro being the remaining divided between the other two airlines. The consortium had however monopoly of international routes and operated in all major Brazilian cities.

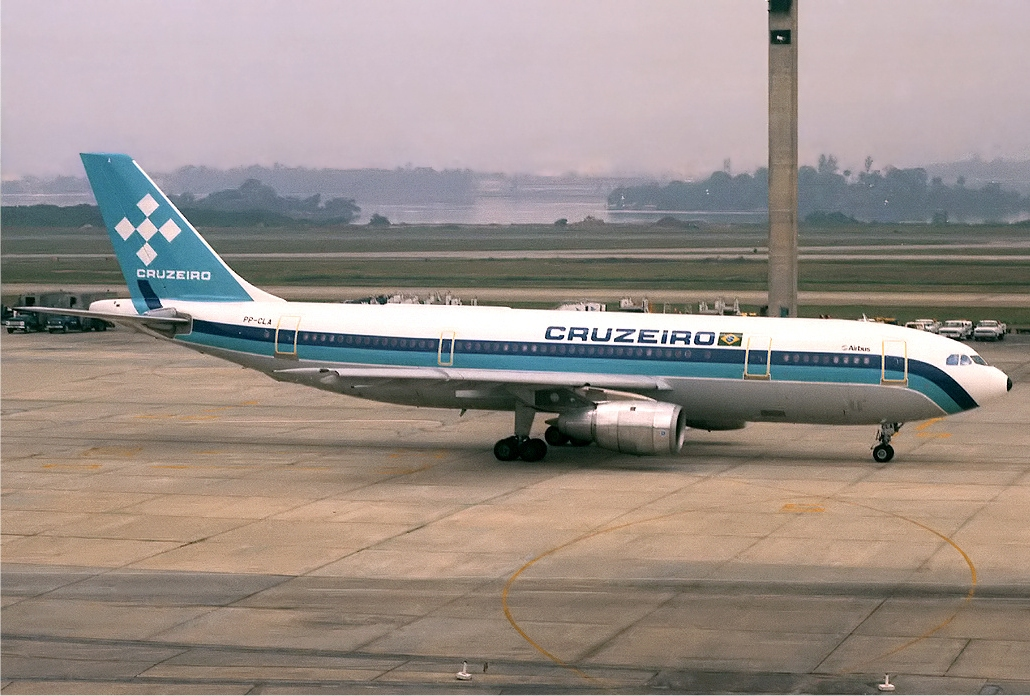
Airbus A300 at Rio de Janeiro–Galeão International Airport in 1984.

In 1979 Cruzeiro bought two Airbus A300B4s. On 14 June 1983, Cruzeiro using its concessions opened new international services to Port of Spain and Bridgetown. He maintained existing ones to Montevideo, Buenos Aires, La Paz, Santa Cruz de la Sierra, Iquitos, Paramaribo and Cayenne. In 1986, the fleet of Cruzeiro consisted of 2 Airbus A-300, 6 Boeing 727-100 and 6 737-200.

In the economic arena however, the deficit, since the purchase by Varig never ceased to grow. Finally, on 1 January 1993, Serviços Aéreos Cruzeiro do Sul ceased to exist when it was fully absorbed into Varig. In 1997 the last 737-200 still painted with the Cruzeiro color scheme and with Cruzeiro registration received Varig colors. This aircraft ceased to operate in 2001.

=== Destinations in 1975 ===
According to the April 1975 Cruzeiro do Sul system timetable, the airline was operating scheduled passenger service to the following destinations in South America with an all-jet fleet composed of Boeing 727-100, Boeing 737-200 and Sud Aviation Caravelle aircraft:

- Bahia
- Belém
- Belo Horizonte
- Boa Vista
- Bogotá
- Brasília
- Buenos Aires
- Campo Grande
- Cayenne
- Cruzeiro do Sul
- Cuiabá
- Curitiba
- Fortaleza
- Iquitos
- Leticia
- Lima
- Macapa
- Manaus
- Montevideo
- Paramaribo
- Porto Alegre
- Porto Velho
- Recife
- Rio Branco
- Santa Cruz de la Sierra
- Santarém
- Sao Luis
- São Paulo
- Rio de Janeiro
- Tabatinga
- Tefe

== Fleet ==
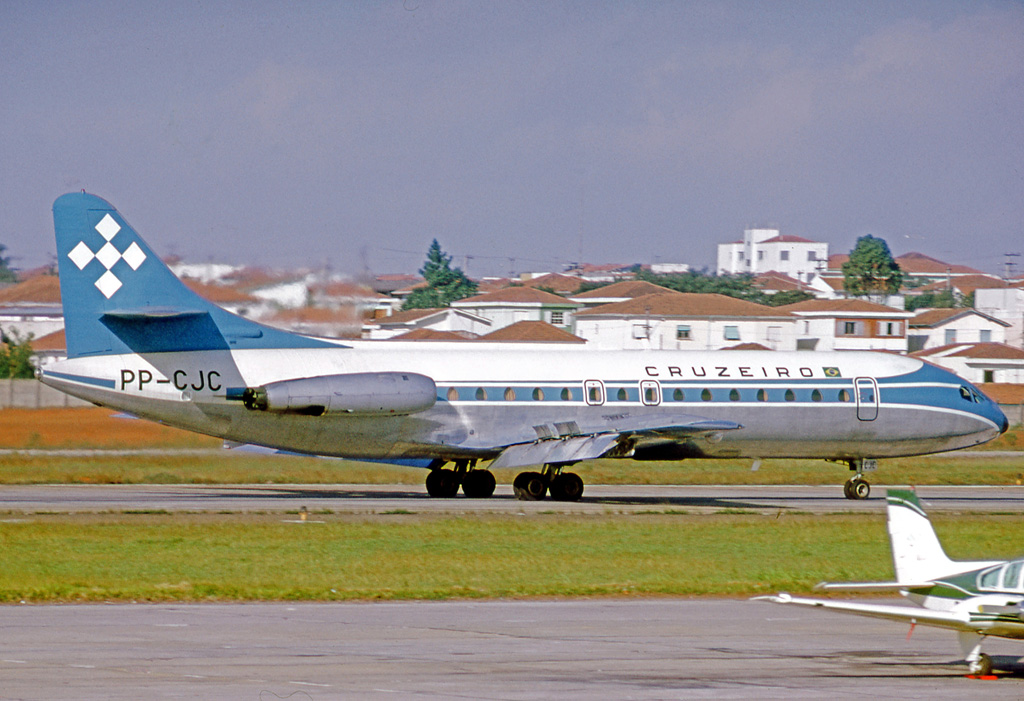
A Sud Aviation SE-210 Caravelle VIR at São Paulo Congonhas Airport in 1975

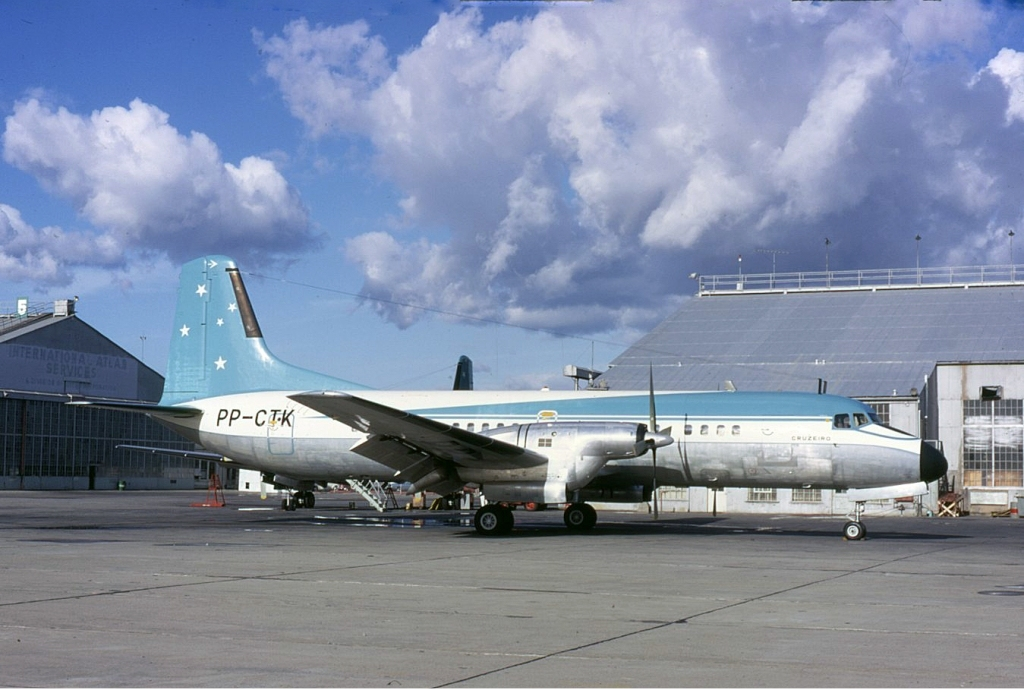
A NAMC YS-11

Syndicato Condor and Serviços Aéreos Cruzeiro do Sul fleet
Aircraft	Total	Years of operation	Notes
Dornier Wal	5	1927–1934	flying boat
Junkers G-24	3	1928–1938	
Junkers F-13	4	1928–1945	
Junkers W-33	2	1928	
Junkers W-34	5	1931–1945	
Junkers Ju-46	2	1934–1945	
Junkers Ju 52/3m	16	1934–1945	some operated as floatplanes
Focke-Wulf Fw 200 Condor	2	1939–1947	
Focke-Wulf Fw58c Weihe	2	1940–1942	
Douglas DC-3/C-47	50	1945–1974	
Lockheed 12A	2	1945	
Beechcraft AT-11	5	1946–1968	
Douglas DC-4	3	1946–1952	
Convair 340	4	1954–1967	
Douglas C-39	1	1955–1961	
Fairchild C-82A Packet	10	1957–1970	
Convair 440	5	1958–1967	
Convair 240	10	1958–1967	
Sud Aviation SE-210 Caravelle VI	7	1962–1975	3 Received from Panair do Brasil
Consolidated PBY-5A/6A Catalina	3	1965–1969	Received from Panair do Brasil
NAMC YS-11/11A	11	1967–1977	
Boeing 727-100	8	1971–1993	
Boeing 737-200	6	1975–1993	
Airbus A300B4	2	1980–1993	
McDonnell Douglas MD-82	1	1982–1983	

== Accidents and incidents ==
Major accidents involving fatalities:

=== Accidents as Syndicato Condor ===
- 3 December 1928: a flying boat Dornier Wal registration P-BACA crashed on Guanabara Bay. The crash was caused by a wing collapsing as a result of a violent maneuver to avoid a collision against another aircraft of the same company, during a celebratory flight upon the arrival of Alberto Santos Dumont to Rio de Janeiro on a passenger liner. All ten passengers, prominent Brazilians, and four crew members died. This was the first accident with an aircraft registered in Brazil, that caused victims other than the crew and that received wide media coverage.
- 11 September 1931: a flying boat Dornier Wal registration P-BALA while on take-off procedures from Potengi river in Natal collided against a boat. Three crew members died.
- 3 May 1934: a Junkers W-34 registration PP-CAR crashed during landing procedures at Rio de Janeiro. Two crew members died. The plane was recuperated and suffered a second accident on 16 April 1944 which is listed under Cruzeiro do Sul.
- 22 May 1938: a floatplane Junkers Ju 52/3m registration PP-CBC flying from Santos to Paranaguá crashed due to rough waters while take-off procedures in Santos. Two passengers died.
- 15 August 1938: a floatplane Junkers Ju 52/3m registration PP-CAT suffered an accident while take-off procedures from Guanabara Bay. All five passengers and four crew died.
- 13 January 1939: a Junkers Ju 52/3m registration PP-CAY en route from Vitória to Rio de Janeiro crashed into Sambé peak near Rio Bonito, Rio de Janeiro. Four crew members and five passengers died.
- 24 February 1942: a Junkers W-34 registration P-BAOA/PP-CAO crashed while attempting an emergency landing at Riachão, Maranhão. Two crew members died.

=== Accidents as Serviços Aéreos Cruzeiro do Sul ===
- 16 April 1944: a Junkers W-34 registration PP-CAR crashed during and emergency landing at Rio de Janeiro-Santos Dumont. Two crew members died.
- 13 March 1948: a Douglas C-53D-DO registration PP-CBX flying to São Paulo-Congonhas crashed on Cantareira Mountains, near São Paulo. All 6 passengers and crew aboard died.
- 22 March 1951: a Douglas C-53D-DO registration PP-CCX while landing at Florianópolis crashed following an overshoot in bad weather and an engine failure. Of the 14 passengers and crew, 3 died.
- 12 September 1954: a Douglas C-47A-70-DL registration PP-CDJ flying from Rio de Janeiro-Santos Dumont to São Paulo-Congonhas was forced to return to Rio de Janeiro due to technical problems and bad weather at São Paulo. On finals to Rio de Janeiro the aircraft came in too high. An overshoot was attempted but the aircraft descended and crashed into the Guanabara Bay. Six passengers out of 30 occupants died.
- 26 August 1955: a Douglas C-53D-DO registration PP-CBY en route from Rio de Janeiro-Santos Dumont to Caravelas struck a peak on Caparaó Mountains, located near Castelo, Espírito Santo. The flight was outside the airway and the peak was not clearly marked on the chart. All 4 crew and 9 passengers died.
- 1 December 1955: a Douglas C-47B-28-DK registration PP-CCC after takeoff from Belém-Val de Cans lost power on engine no.1. Consequent technical problems led the aircraft to lose altitude and the left wing struck a tree and broke off. The aircraft stalled, hit the ground and caught fire. All 6 passengers and crew died.
- 11 January 1958: a Fairchild C-82A-FA Packet registration PP-CEH on a training flight, while on initial climb from Rio de Janeiro lost altitude, struck a barrier and crashed in Guanabara Bay. Two of the crew members died.
- 16 January 1958: a cargo Fairchild C-82A-FA Packet registration PP-CEF crashed near Belém-Val de Cans when no.1 engine caught fire after take-off. The crew of 3 died.
- 16 June 1958: a Convair 440-59 registration PP-CEP flying from Florianópolis to Curitiba-Afonso Pena was on final approach procedures to land at Curitiba in bad weather when it was caught in windshears. The aircraft descended and struck the ground. Of the 27 passengers and crew aboard, 24 died including ex-president Nereu Ramos.
- 12 April 1960: a Douglas C-53 registration PP-CDS belonging to Varig and operating a flight from Pelotas to Porto Alegre collided with two other aircraft, crashed and caught fire after it deviated to the right on take-off and an over correction caused a sharp turn to the left. Of the 22 passengers and crew aboard, 10 died.
- 9 May 1962: a Convair 240-D registration PP-CEZ on final approach to Vitória struck a tree at a height of 40m, 1,860m short of the runway. It should have been at 150m. Of the 31 passengers and crew aboard, 28 died.
- 15 January 1963: a Convair 240-D registration PP-CEV on approach to São Paulo-Congonhas crashed into houses in the neighborhood of Jabaquara after an engine failed. Of the 45 passengers and crew aboard, 6 died. Seven persons on the ground were also killed.
- 3 May 1963: a Convair 340-59 registration PP-CDW operating Flight 144 flying from São Paulo-Congonhas to Rio de Janeiro-Santos Dumont had to return to São Paulo after no.2 engine caught fire. When on finals to touch down, the aircraft nosed up 45°, stalled and struck a house. Of the 50 passengers and crew aboard, 37 died.
- 19 October 1966: a Consolidated PBY-5A Catalina registration PP-PEC, while doing a training flight in the Belém region crashed. All 4 crew members died.
- 20 October 1968: a Douglas C-47 A-25-DK registration PP-SAD had an engine failure and crashed after take-off and while trying to return to Feijó. All 19 passengers and crew died.
- 28 September 1971: a Douglas DC-3 A-414A registration PP-CBV crashed after take-off from Sena Madureira bound to Rio Branco. The aircraft suffered an engine failure at climb-out. The pilot tried to return to the airport but because the turn was done at very low altitude, the right wing struck trees causing the aircraft to crash. All 32 passengers and crew died.
- 1 June 1973: a Sud Aviation SE-210 Caravelle VIN registration PP-PDX operating Flight 109 from Belém-Val de Cans to São Luís crashed on approach to São Luís. Engine no.1 lost power and the aircraft attained an extreme nose-up attitude. It stalled and crashed 760m to the right of the runway. All 23 passengers and crew died.

=== Incidents as Serviços Aéreos Cruzeiro do Sul ===
- 8 October 1969: a Sud Aviation SE-210 Caravelle VI R en route from Belém-Val de Cans to Manaus-Ponta Pelada was hijacked by 4 persons who demanded to be flown to Cuba. The hijack lasted less than a day and there were no victims.
- 12 November 1969: a NAMC YS-11/11A en route from Manaus-Ponta Pelada to Belém-Val de Cans was hijacked by a person who demanded to be flown to Cuba. There were no victims.
- 1 January 1970: a Sud Aviation SE-210 Caravelle VI R operating Flight 114 en route from Montevideo to Rio de Janeiro-Galeão, with 28 occupants aboard, was hijacked by 6 persons who demanded to be flown to Cuba. The flight was diverted to Lima, Panama City-Tocumen and arrived in Havana two days later. There were no victims.
- 1 July 1970: the Sud Aviation SE-210 Caravelle VI R operating registration PP-PDX en route from Rio de Janeiro-Galeão to São Paulo with 31 occupants was hijacked by 4 persons who demanded the release of political prisoners that were to be taken to Cuba. The aircraft was stormed and the hijackers arrested. There were no victims and the hijacking lasted less than a day.
- 4 July 1970: a NAMC YS-11 en route from Belém-Val de Cans to Macapá was hijacked by 1 person and flown to Cayenne, Georgetown, Trinidad and Tobago, Antigua and Jamaica.
- 3 February 1984: an Airbus A300B4-203 operating Flight 302 en route from São Luís to Belém-Val de Cans with 176 passengers and crew aboard was hijacked by 3 persons who demanded to be taken to Cuba. The flight reached Camagüey in less than a day. There were no deaths among the victims.

== See also ==
- Condor Syndikat
- Deutsche Luft Hansa (1926–1945)
- Varig
- List of defunct airlines of Brazil

== Bibliography ==
- Beting, Gianfranco; Beting, Joelmir (2009). Varig: Eterna Pioneira (in Portuguese). Porto Alegre and São Paulo: EDIPUCRS and Beting Books. pp. 12–20, 160–166. ISBN 978-85-7430-901-9.
- Instituto Histórico-Cultural da Aeronáutica (1990). História Geral da Aeronáutica Brasileira: de 1921 às vésperas da criação do Ministério da Aeronáutica (in Portuguese). Vol. 2. Belo Horizonte and Rio de Janeiro: Itatiaia and Instituto Histórico-Cultural da Aeronáutica. pp. 384–388.
- Instituto Histórico-Cultural da Aeronáutica (1991). História Geral da Aeronáutica Brasileira: da criação do Ministério da Aeronáutica ao final da Segunda Guerra Mundial (in Portuguese). Vol. 3. Belo Horizonte and Rio de Janeiro: Villa Rica Editoras Reunidas. pp. 299–303.
- Instituto Histórico-Cultural da Aeronáutica (2005). História Geral da Aeronáutica Brasileira: de janeiro de 1946 a janeiro de 1956 após o término da Segunda Guerra Mundial até a posse do Dr. Juscelino Kubitschek como Presidente da República (in Portuguese). Vol. 4. Rio de Janeiro: GR3 Comunicação & Design. pp. 348–349.
