= Panair do Brasil Flight 026 =

1962 aviation accident in Brazil

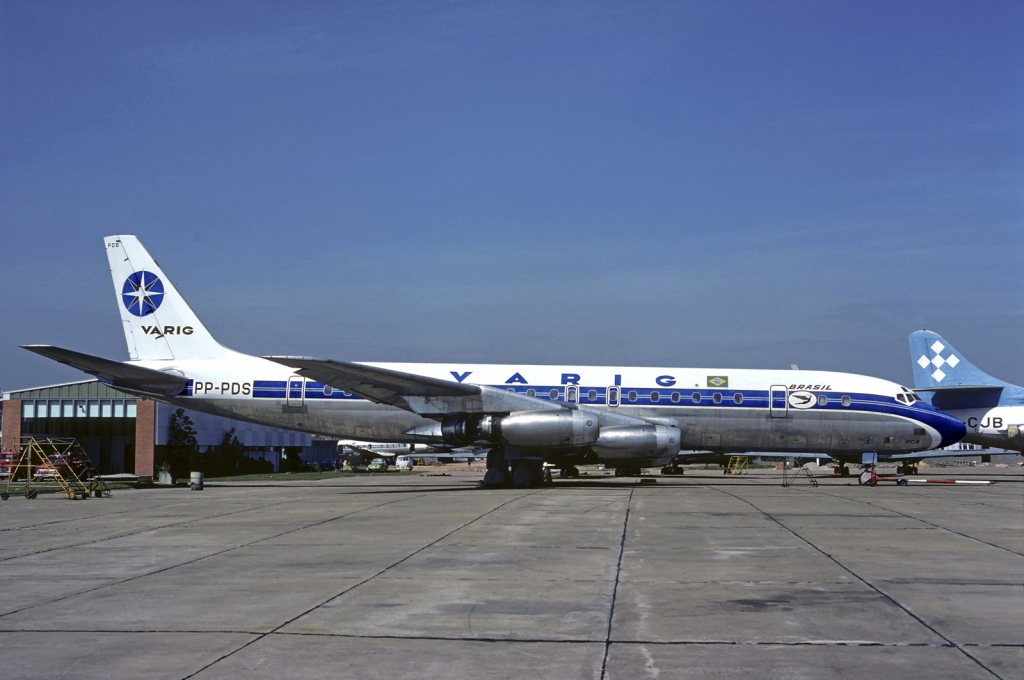
- A Douglas DC-8 similar to the aircraft involved in the accident

Accident
- Date: 20 August 1962
- Summary: Runway excursion after takeoff
- Site: Guanabara Bay, Brazil

Aircraft
- Aircraft type: Douglas DC-8-33
- Aircraft name: Bandeirante Brás Cubas
- Operator: Panair do Brasil
- IATA flight No.: PB026
- Registration: PP-PDT
- Flight origin: Ezeiza International Airport, Argentina
- 1st stopover: Rio de Janeiro/Galeão International Airport, Brazil
- 2nd stopover: Lisbon Airport, Portugal
- Last stopover: Paris Orly Airport, France
- Destination: London Heathrow Airport, United Kingdom
- Occupants: 105
- Passengers: 94
- Crew: 11
- Fatalities: 15
- Injuries: 34
- Survivors: 90

Panair do Brasil Flight 026 was an air route connecting South America to Europe, operated by the airline Panair do Brasil. The route had its terminals in Buenos Aires and London, with scheduled stops in Rio de Janeiro, Lisbon, and Paris. On 20 August 1962, during the stopover in Rio de Janeiro, the crew of the Douglas DC-8 (registration PP-PDT) failed to take off from runway 14/32 at Galeão Airport.

Although the takeoff was aborted, the DC-8 continued rolling along the runway until it reached the end. After crashing through the airport perimeter wall, the DC-8 crossed an avenue and plunged into the waters of Guanabara Bay. Of the 120 people on board, 15 drowned (including an infant only a few months old).

== Background ==
=== Aircraft ===
The plane involved was a Douglas DC-8-33 manufactured and delivered to Panair do Brasil on March 21, 1961 as PP-PDT. It was the airline's first DC-8 ever.

=== Crew members ===
The captain was considered to have adapted well to the aircraft. He had accumulated 13,504 flight hours, 812 of which were in the DC-8.

The co-pilot was also considered experienced, accumulating 14,643 flight hours, including 223 flight hours on the DC-8

The flight engineer had accumulated 7,508 flight hours, including 906 flight hours on the DC-8.

== Accident ==
Around 10:30 PM, the crew began the takeoff roll. After reaching 175 knots and passing V1 (the point of no return for aborting takeoff), the DC-8 failed to lift off. Consequently, the crew initiated procedures to abort the takeoff. Despite the use of wheel brakes, engine thrust reversers, and the emergency brake, the aircraft continued to roll at high speed; it overran the end of the runway and crashed into the airport perimeter wall, losing one engine and part of the landing gear while leaving a trail of fuel from ruptured wing tanks. After exiting the airport grounds, the DC-8 crossed the coastal avenue and plunged into the waters of Guanabara Bay, subsequently catching fire. The wreckage of the DC-8 remained afloat for approximately 25 minutes, allowing the majority of those on board to escape. Even so, fourteen passengers (including a newborn) and one crew member drowned.

== Investigations ==
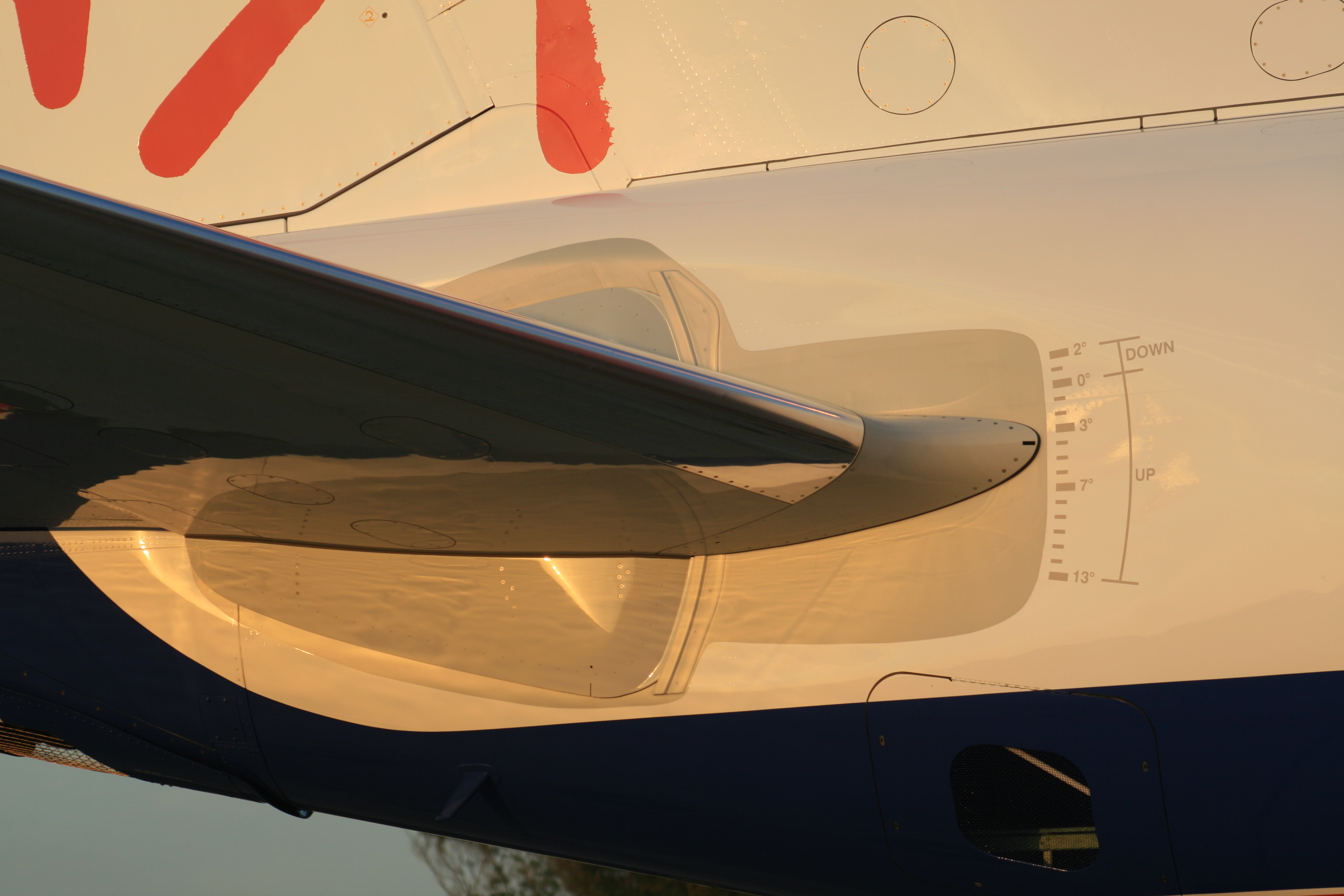
View of the horizontal stabilizer on an Embraer 170. Incorrect adjustment of the horizontal stabilizer prevented the Panair do Brasil jet from taking off.

Shortly after the accident, an investigation commission was established. Based on the wreckage, witness statements, and, crucially, the flight plan, investigators concluded that the cause of the accident lay in the incorrect configuration of the horizontal stabilizer.
