= 302 Clarissa =

Main-belt asteroid

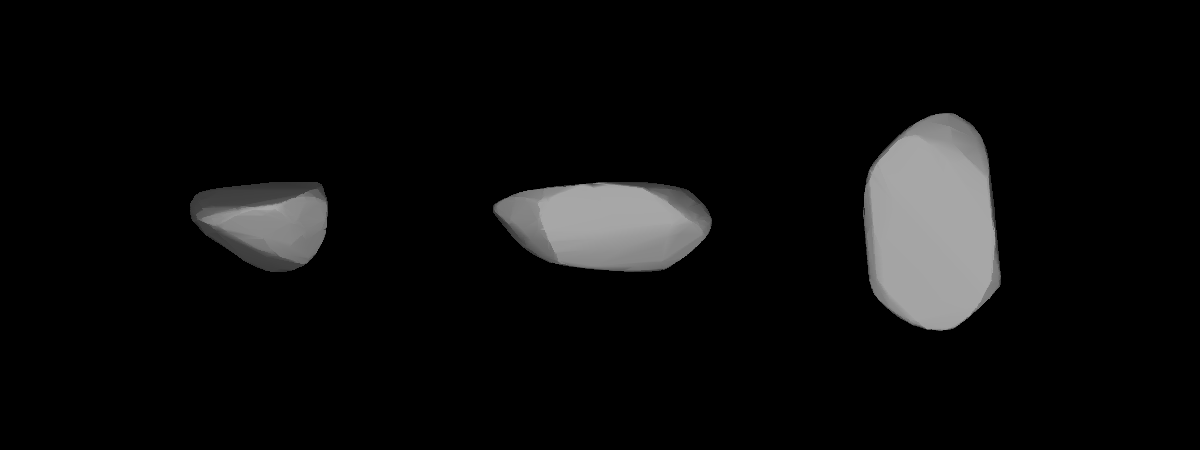
- A three-dimensional model of 302 Clarissa based on its lightcurve

Discovery
- Discovered by: Auguste Charlois
- Discovery date: 14 November 1890

Designations
- Alternative designations: A890 VA; 1909 YA; 1929 CK_{1}; 1946 UN; 1948 ED; 1953 NN
- Minor planet category: Main belt

Orbital characteristics
- Epoch 31 July 2016 (JD 2457600.5)
- Uncertainty parameter 0
- Observation arc: 124.04 yr (45,305 d)
- Aphelion: 2.67 AU (400.04 Gm)
- Perihelion: 2.14 AU (319.61 Gm)
- Semi-major axis: 2.41 AU (359.82 Gm)
- Eccentricity: 0.11175
- Orbital period (sidereal): 3.73 yr (1,362.5 d)
- Mean anomaly: 213.798°
- Mean motion: 0° 15^{m} 51.174^{s} / day
- Inclination: 3.41369°
- Longitude of ascending node: 7.85637°
- Argument of perihelion: 54.5926°

Physical characteristics
- Mean diameter: 43 ± 4 km 43 ± 11 km (alternate)
- Mean density: 1.5 g cm^{−3}
- Synodic rotation period: 14.47670 h (0.603196 d)
- Pole ecliptic longitude: 28° 190° (alternate)
- Pole ecliptic latitude: −72°
- Geometric albedo: 0.0524±0.010
- Spectral type: F
- Absolute magnitude (H): 10.89

302 Clarissa is a typical main-belt asteroid. The asteroid was discovered by the French astronomer Auguste Charlois on 14 November 1890 in Nice. The origin of the name is unknown. In 1991, 302 Clarissa was being considered as a possible flyby target for the Cassini spacecraft, but was later removed from consideration.

This body is orbiting the Sun with a period of 3.73 years and an eccentricity (ovalness) of 0.11. The orbital plane is inclined by 3.4° to the plane of the ecliptic. There are no major planetary resonances near the orbit of 302 Clarissa. It has a retrograde spin with a rotation period of 14.4797 hours. Stellar occultation data provides a size estimate of 43±4 km, while IRAS data gives a diameter of 38.5±3.1 km. It is classified as a F-type asteroid and is probably composed of carbonaceous material.

302 Clarissa provides the eponym for a small collisional asteroid family of mostly C-type asteroids. This group consists of 179 bodies with orbits clustered around 302 Clarissa. The family has a small extent of semi-major axis values, suggesting this is a young group; its estimated age is 56±5 Myr. Seventy to ninety percent of the objects in this family have a retrograde spin, suggesting the parent body may have possessed a similar rotation. This family is one of five that are candidate sources for the near-Earth asteroids 101955 Bennu and 162173 Ryugu.

== Spacecraft visits ==
At present, Clarissa has not been visited by any spacecraft. As of 1991, mission planning for the Cassini–Huygens spacecraft included a flyby of Clarissa while leaving the inner solar system in November 1998; however, due to delays, the launch of Cassini–Huygens was moved from November 1995 to October 1997, thus negating the option to pass near Clarissa. Cassini–Huygens passed by asteroid 2685 Masursky on 23 January 2000 instead.
