= Serviços Aéreos Cruzeiro do Sul Flight 302 =

1984 airliner hijacking

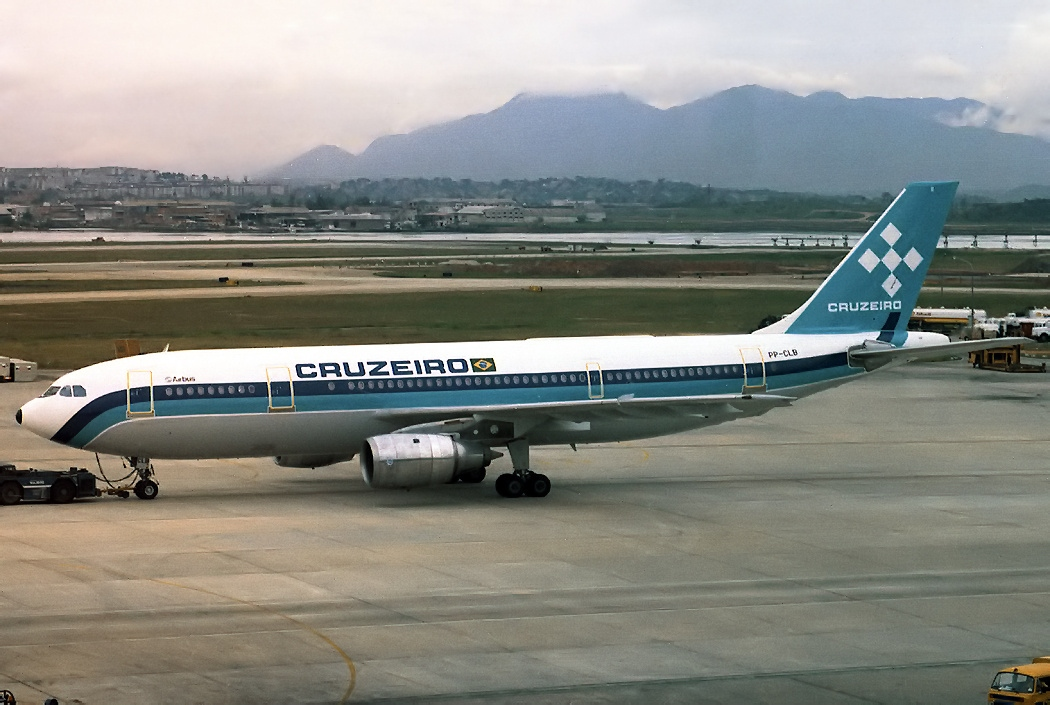
- PP-CLB, the aircraft involved in the incident, photographed in November 1984

Incident
- Date: February 3, 1984
- Summary: Hijacking
- Site: In route to Belém, Pará, Brazil

Aircraft
- Aircraft type: Airbus A300B4-203
- Operator: Serviços Aéreos Cruzeiro do Sul
- Registration: PP-CLB
- Flight origin: Rio de Janeiro/Galeão International Airport
- 1st stopover: Salvador International Airport
- 2nd stopover: Recife/Guararapes–Gilberto Freyre International Airport
- 3rd stopover: Fortaleza Airport
- 4th stopover: Marechal Cunha Machado International Airport
- Last stopover: Belém/Val-de-Cans International Airport
- Destination: Eduardo Gomes International Airport
- Passengers: 162
- Crew: 14
- Fatalities: 0
- Survivors: 176 (all)

Serviços Aéreos Cruzeiro do Sul Flight 302 (IATA: SC302) was a scheduled domestic flight operated from Rio de Janeiro to Manaus in Brazil, operated by Serviços Aéreos Cruzeiro do Sul. On 3 February 1984, the Airbus A300 aircraft flying the service, was hijacked while flying from São Luís to Belém and was forced to divert to Cuba. There were no fatalities among the 176 passengers and crew.

== Hijacking ==
The aircraft, carrying 14 crew and 162 passengers, had taken of from Marechal Cunha Machado International Airport at 22:38 local time and was due to land at Belém two hours after. During the flight, the hijackers entered the cockpit and they ordered the crew to fly to Cayenne, but the crew told them that the runway was too short. The hijackers then directed the plane to Paramaribo. The captain told that the hijackers seemed very nervous and one repeatedly said "if this fails, we're ready to die". A passenger said that "The hijackers were very tense, but we convinced them to stay calm and free the passengers" and he also said that "Most passengers didn't know a hijacking was occurring. A stewardess asked if there was a doctor and I volunteered. In the cabin, I found two men with guns and a woman holding a crying child in her arms".

The aircraft landed at Paramaribo and the hijackers were persuaded by a delegation of officials at the airport in Paramaribo to release the 154 passengers in exchange for fuel. The airline dispatched an aircraft to pick up passengers in Suriname and took them to their original destinations in Belém and Manaus.

The aircraft left for Cuba about 3:30 local time. The aircraft landed at Camagüey International Airport at 7:46 local time. The Cuban officials agreed to allow the plane and crew to return to Brazil after being contacted through the Swiss Embassy.

== See also ==
- VASP Flight 375
- List of aircraft hijackings
