= Condor Syndikat =

1924–27 German airline trade company with operations in Brazil

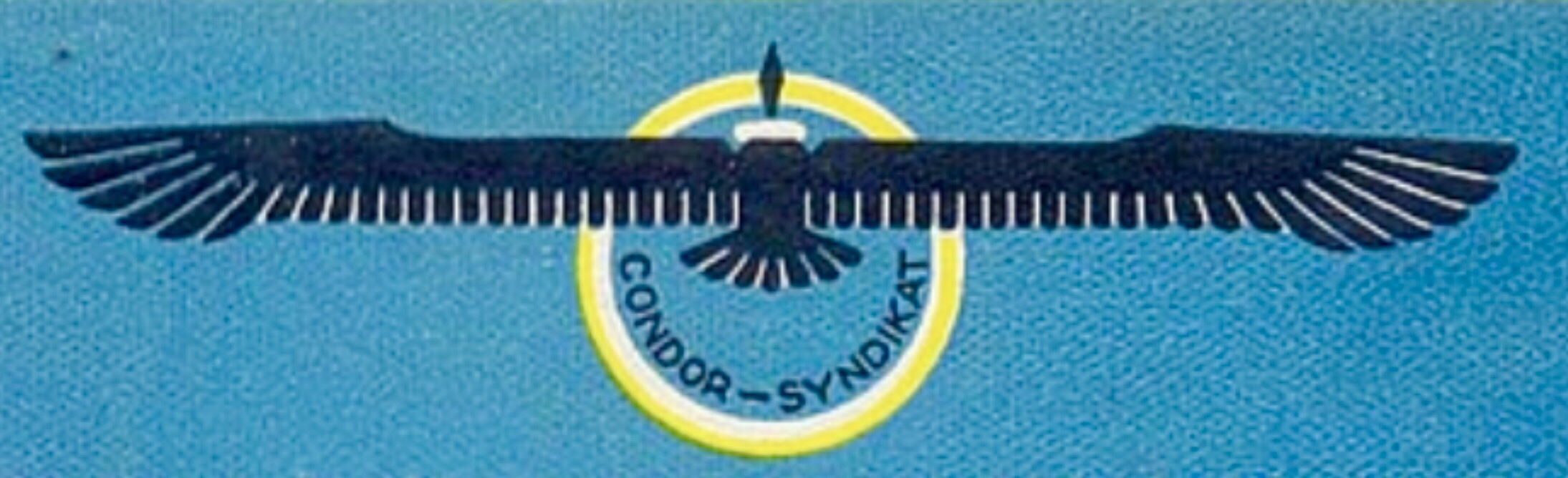
- Founded: 1924; 101 years ago
- Ceased operations: 1927; 98 years ago
- Hubs: Rio de Janeiro, Porto Alegre
- Fleet size: 5
- Parent company: Deutscher Aero Lloyd and later Deutsche Luft Hansa
- Headquarters: Berlin
- Key people: Fritz W. Hammer

Condor Syndikat was a German trade company, with headquarters in Berlin, that operated airline services in Brazil while also providing aircraft, maintenance and aviation information. It was also the parent company of the Brazilian airlines Varig and Syndicato Condor, which later became Serviços Aéreos Cruzeiro do Sul. They were the two oldest airlines in Brazil.

== History ==
On May 5, 1924, the German airline Deutsche Aero Lloyd established a partnership with the Colombian company Sociedad Colombo-Alemana de Transporte Aéreo – SCADTA to create the Condor Syndikat. SCADTA was interested in establishing international passenger services linking Colombia to other countries in Central America and to the United States. Deutscher Aero Lloyd, on the other hand, wanted to establish a base for a future transatlantic service to South America, while selling aircraft manufactured in Germany, aviation equipment and maintenance services.

With this intention, two Dornier Do J Wal seaplanes were bought and were put into service for SCADTA. Services however were not as successful as planned, particularly because of the resistance of American authorities. The seaplanes were thus returned to Germany. The failure however became a golden opportunity for AeroLloyd to implement its own plans. A few months later two planes, one of them named Atlântico, were sent by ship to Montevideo and flown to Buenos Aires.

On November 17, 1926, a German commercial mission was organized by the Pilot, Engineer and General-Director of Condor Syndikat Fritz W. Hammer, with the presence of Dr. Hans Luther, a former chancellor of the German Reich, at the time of the Weimar Republic took off from Buenos Aires. Though officially an enterprise of Condor Syndikat, in reality it was heavily subsidized by the German Government via Deutsche Luft Hansa. This commercial mission flew first from Buenos Aires to Porto Alegre via Montevideo and then on to Rio de Janeiro, where it arrived on November 27, 1926. On January 1, 1927, the aircraft flew back to Florianópolis with a few illustrious guests aboard. Among them were journalists, a minister, and a cinematographer. As a result of this successful demonstration, on January 26, 1927, Condor Syndikat received a provisory one-year authorization to operate air services in Brazil.

Those services had three different routes: one linked Rio de Janeiro to Porto Alegre via Santos, Paranaguá, São Francisco do Sul, and Florianópolis. The second service linked Porto Alegre to Rio Grande via Pelotas. The third was between Porto Alegre and Santa Vitória do Palmar, on the border with Uruguay. This service could, pending authorization from the Uruguayan authorities, be extended to Montevideo. The first flight between Rio de Janeiro and Porto Alegre took off one day later, on January 27, 1927, operated by the Dornier Do J Wal Atlântico, still with the German registration D-1012. It arrived in Porto Alegre two days later. Later, the Atlântico would be the aircraft to receive the first Brazilian registration: P-BAAA.

On February 22, 1927, Condor Syndikat operated the first flight between Porto Alegre and Rio Grande in which the Atlântico carried crew, three passengers and mail. Those flights continued to be operated with great success and the German name Condor Syndikat became informally known by its Portuguese translation: Syndicato Condor.

Meanwhile, in Germany, Deutsche Luft Hansa was formed on January 6, 1926, with the forced merger of Deutsche Aero Lloyd with Junkers Luftverkehr to form one German national airline. The transaction included subsidiaries such as Condor Syndikat, which officially ceased to exist on July 1, 1927. In order to care for the ongoing interests of Luft Hansa in Brazil, on December 1, 1927, a Brazilian company was officially formed and named Syndicato Condor.

On June 10, 1927, the Brazilian Government authorized a businessman from Porto Alegre, Otto Ernst Meyer-Labastille, to establish an airline that could operate in the States of Santa Catarina and Rio Grande do Sul, and to extend the services, with the necessary governmental authorizations, to Uruguay. This airline was named Viação Aérea Rio-Grandense – Varig, which had the support of Condor Syndikat, including share-holding. In order to facilitate start-up operations, Condor Syndikat transferred to Varig its rights for the route Porto Alegre - Rio Grande and the seaplane Atlântico. Flights started on June 22, 1927. Until that date, Condor Syndikat had already made 63 flights and carried 800 passengers and tons of post between the two cities.

On January 20, 1928, the Brazilian Government authorized the establishment of an airline called Syndicato Condor. Its first share-holders were the three directors of Condor Syndikat, including Fritz W. Hammer, and the Brazilian Count Pereira Carneiro, owner of Jornal do Brasil and a shipping company. It could operate in all Brazilian territory and extend services, with the necessary governmental authorizations, to Uruguay and Argentina. Between the end of Condor Syndikat and the birth of Syndicato Condor services never stopped and Syndicato Condor informally and later formally took over the rights and interests of Condor Syndikat. Condor Syndikat and later Syndicato Condor kept the rights and operations between Rio de Janeiro and Porto Alegre, and further to Montevideo and Buenos Aires, because this route was of utmost interest for the future plans of Deutsche Luft Hansa in South America. Later, Syndicato Condor extended the route north to Recife and connected its network to the one of Deutsche Luft Hansa.

== Fleet ==
The Condor Syndikat fleet consisted of the following aircraft:

Aircraft	Total	Years of Operation
Dornier Do J Wal	4	1924–1927
Junkers G-24	1	1926–1927

== See also ==
- Deutsche Luft Hansa
- Serviços Aéreos Cruzeiro do Sul
- Varig
- List of defunct airlines of Brazil

== Bibliography ==
- Beting, Gianfranco; Beting, Joelmir (2009). Varig: Eterna Pioneira (in Portuguese). Porto Alegre and São Paulo: EDIPUCRS and Beting Books. pp. 12–20. ISBN 978-85-7430-901-9.
- Instituto Histórico-Cultural da Aeronáutica (1990). História Geral da Aeronáutica Brasileira: de 1921 às vésperas da criação do Ministério da Aeronáutica (in Portuguese). Vol. 2. Belo Horizonte and Rio de Janeiro: Itatiaia and Instituto Histórico-Cultural da Aeronáutica. pp. 384–388.
- Pereira, Aldo (1987). Breve história da aviação comercial brasileira (in Portuguese). Rio de Janeiro: Europa Empresa Gráfica e Editora. pp. 40–46.
