= TRIP Linhas Aéreas =

IATA	ICAO	Call sign
T4	TIB	TRIP
- Founded: 1998
- Ceased operations: 2014 (integrated into Azul Brazilian Airlines)
- Hubs: Tancredo Neves International Airport
- Frequent-flyer program: Tudo Azul
- Fleet size: 54
- Destinations: 93
- Parent company: Azul Brazilian Airlines
- Headquarters: Belo Horizonte, Minas Gerais
- Key people: José Mario Caprioli dos Santos
- Website: www.voetrip.com.br

TRIP Linhas Aéreas S/A (formerly Transporte Aéreo Regional do Interior Paulista) was a domestic regional airline based in Belo Horizonte, Minas Gerais, Brazil.

According to the National Civil Aviation Agency of Brazil (ANAC) between January and December 2012 Trip had 4.47% of the domestic market share in terms of passengers per kilometre flown.

== History ==
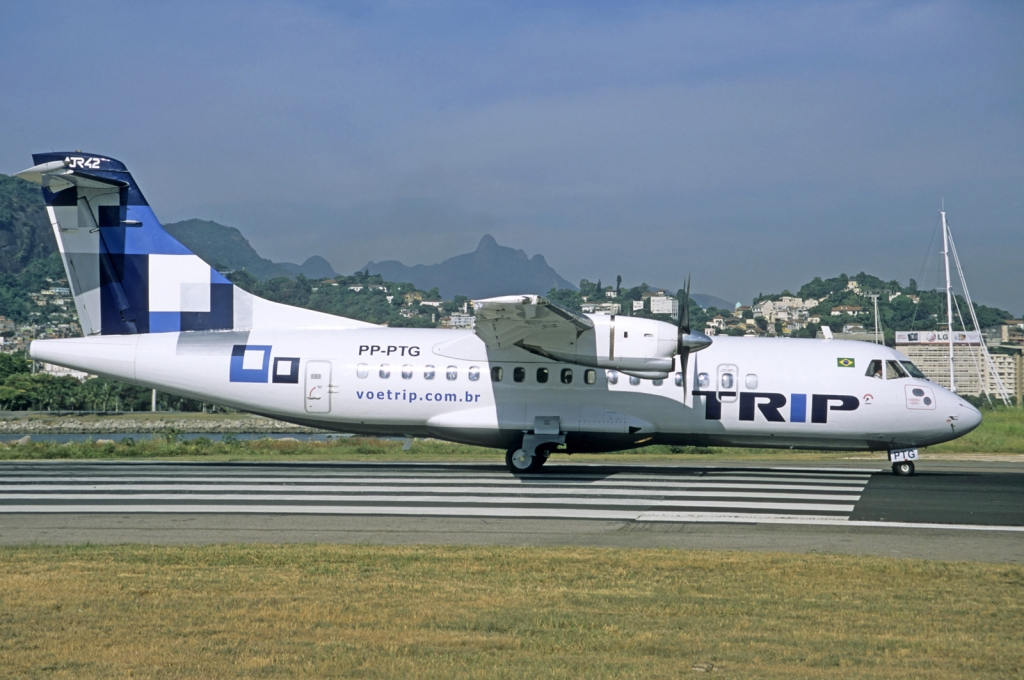
An ATR 42-320 of TRIP Linhas Aéreas

The airline was established in 1998 with two Embraer EMB 120 Brasilias and was wholly owned by the Caprioli Group until November 2006, when Águia Branca Group (Chieppe family) bought 49% of its capital.

On January 25, 2007, TRIP Linhas Aéreas has placed an order for seven new ATR 72-500s with options for a further five of the twin turboprops, this deal is its first new ATR order, and the first for the ATR 72-500 in Brazil. The Pratt & Whitney Canada PW127-powered aircraft will be configured with 68 seats. With this growth the company expect have more than 500 employees by 2010. As of January 2007, the company has 500 employees.

On November 13, 2007, TRIP Linhas Aéreas and Total Linhas Aéreas agreed to merge, a transaction which was completed in May 2008. The brand Trip is dedicated to passenger service whereas Total is dedicated to charter and cargo services.

On September 4, 2008, it was announced that SkyWest Airlines agreed to purchase up to 20% of the shares of TRIP Linhas Aéreas. The purchase was done in 3 installments and was completed by 2010. In early May 2012 TRIP bought back the shares.

On August 20, 2010, with the bankruptcy of Flex Linhas Aéreas, Trip took over its services provided to Aerodrome Flight Information Service (AFIS), and Meteorology Service (MET) and Airport Information Service (AIS) on several airports in Brazil through the Flex Communication Center (FCC). FCC serves, among others: TAM Airlines, VRG Linhas Aéreas (operator of Gol and Varig brands), VarigLog, Avianca Brasil, NHT Linhas Aéreas, and Embraer.

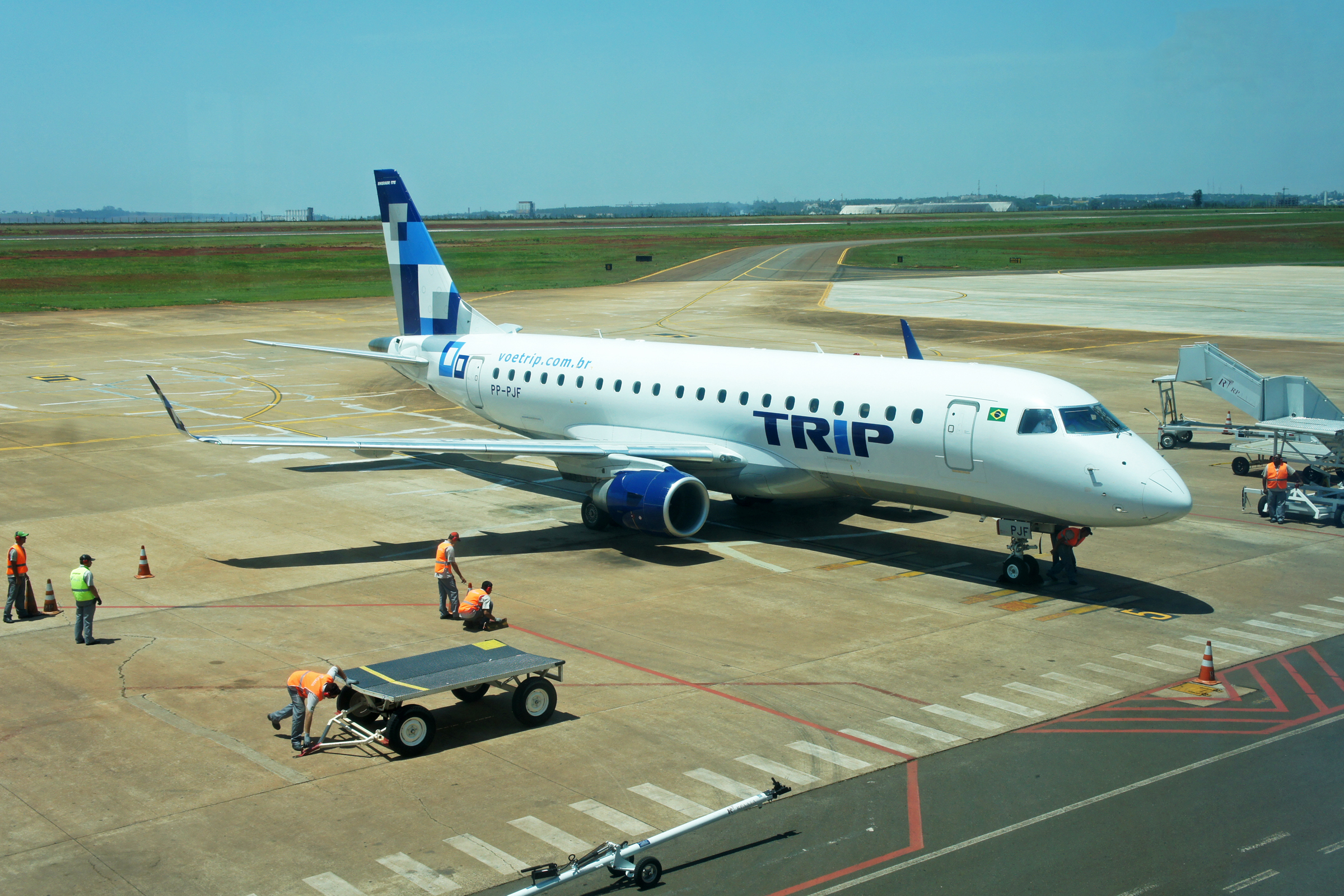
An Embraer 175 of TRIP Linhas Aéreas at Maringá Regional Airport

In order to optimize the use of its aircraft, TRIP announced on July 27, 2011, the creation of TRIP Cargo, the cargo division of TRIP Linhas Aéreas. On a first moment, TRIP Cargo will only use the cargo compartment of its aircraft operating scheduled passenger flights. However, as soon as demand justifies, TRIP cargo will start using ATR-72s for pure cargo flights during the night, when not operating passenger flights. The conversion of the aircraft can be done in 15 minutes.

On September 9, 2011, TRIP Linhas Aéreas placed an order for 18 new ATR 72-600s with options for further 22. Nine of the 18 aircraft will be purchased directly from ATR with the remaining to be leased from Air Lease Corporation and GE Capital Aviation Services. With the entry into service of the 18 firm ATR 72-600s, TRIP Linhas Aéreas will become the largest ATR operator in the world, with a fleet of 51 ATRs. The new aircraft will be configured for 68 passengers.

On March 30, 2011, TAM Airlines signed a letter of intentions to purchase up to 31% of the shares of TRIP Linhas Aéreas. Both airlines maintain code-share agreements since 2004. A final decision had however been postponed, and finally in February 2012 the purchase agreement was not renewed. Code-sharing operations ended on March 28, 2013.

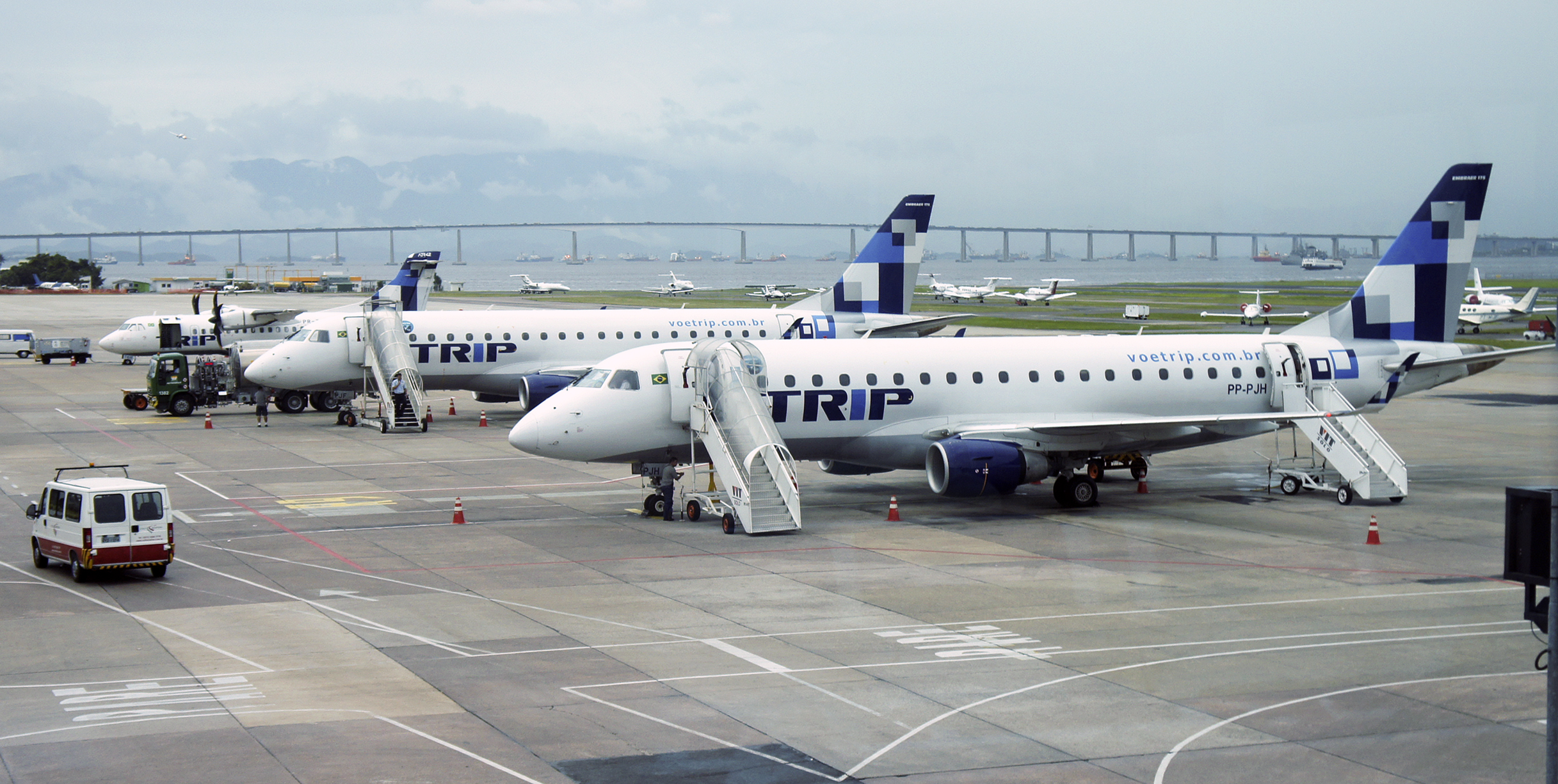
Two Embraer 175 and an ATR 42 of TRIP Linhas Aéreas at Santos Dumont Airport, Rio de Janeiro.

On May 28, 2012, it was announced that Azul Brazilian Airlines purchased TRIP creating the holding Azul Trip. During the year 2012 the brands will co-exist operating in integrated form but eventually, upon government approval, they will merge, maintaining the name Azul.

On a press release dated of September 7, 2012, (the Brazilian Independence Day), Azul and Trip officially announced some visible characteristics of the merger:

- The letter U of Azul will be written in a lighter shade of blue, recalling that previously the same happened with the letter I of Trip. Moreover, U stands for Union;
- The expression Brazilian Airlines will not be used anymore;
- Both airlines will carry the signature Azul e Trip: juntas pelo Brasil (Azul and Trip: together for Brazil) in their aircraft;
- All Trip aircraft will be baptized and will still carry a silver shade in their metal;
- One Embraer and one ATR of TRIP will always bear the original TRIP colours, and one Embraer 195 will bear hybrid colour scheme with base silver colours symbolizing the union of both airlines.

Azul and Trip started comprehensive code-sharing operations on December 2, 2012, and all flights carry now only the IATA code of Azul. However already on October 1, 2012, Trip started operating flights on behalf of Azul. On March 6, 2013, Brazilian authorities gave the final approval for the merger with a few restrictions related to code-sharing with TAM Airlines and slot use at Rio de Janeiro-Santos Dumont Airport. On May 6, 2014, the merger process was completed with the final approval from Brazilian authorities. That day the brand TRIP ceased to exist.

== Fleet ==
As of December 2012 the fleet of Trip Linhas Aéreas included the following aircraft:

TRIP Linhas Aéreas fleet
Aircraft	Total	Orders	Passengers (Y)	Notes
ATR 42-500	19	–	47	
ATR 72-500	14	–	66	
ATR 72-600	2	1	68	
Embraer 175	9	–	86	
Embraer 190	10	–	110	

== Airline affinity program ==
Tudo Azul is Trips's Frequent Flyer Program. It is based on amounts spent and not on flown miles. Members earn 5% of the ticket value on their accounts, which later can be redeemed as a ticket discounts. It is valid also for Azul Brazilian Airlines flights.

== See also ==
- List of defunct airlines of Brazil
