= Nordeste Linhas Aéreas Regionais =

Airline of Brazil (1975–2007)

IATA	ICAO	Call sign
JH	NES	NORDESTE
- Founded: 11 November 1975
- Commenced operations: 25 June 1976
- Ceased operations: 23 October 2007 (rebranded as Flex Linhas Aereas)
- Hubs: Salvador Bahia Airport
- Frequent-flyer program: Smiles
- Parent company: Rio Sul (1995–2002)
- Headquarters: Salvador, Bahia, Brazil
- Key people: Carlos Berardinelli (Director)
- Website: web.archive.org/*/http://www.nordeste.com

Nordeste Linhas Aéreas Regionais S/A was a regional airline based in Brotas, Salvador, Bahia, Brazil, that operated scheduled passenger services in northeast and southeast regions of the country. Its main base was Deputado Luís Eduardo Magalhães International Airport.

Between 2006 and 2008, Viação Aérea Rio-grandense (informally known as old Varig) used the brand Nordeste Linhas Aéreas Regionais for its operations.

== History ==
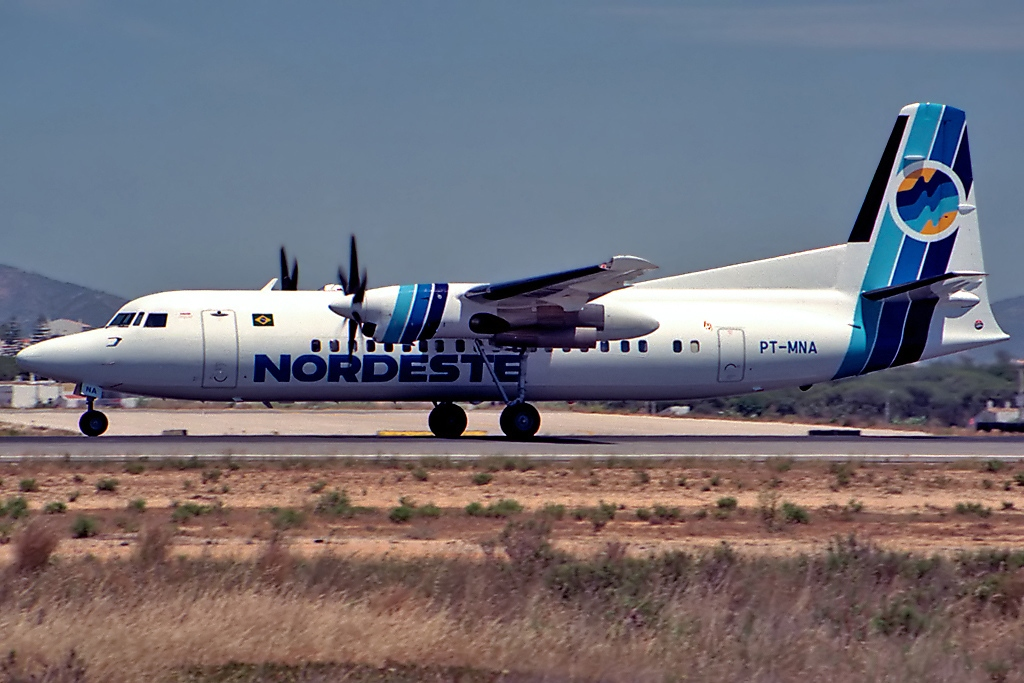
A Nordeste Fokker 50 taxiing at Faro Airport in 1994

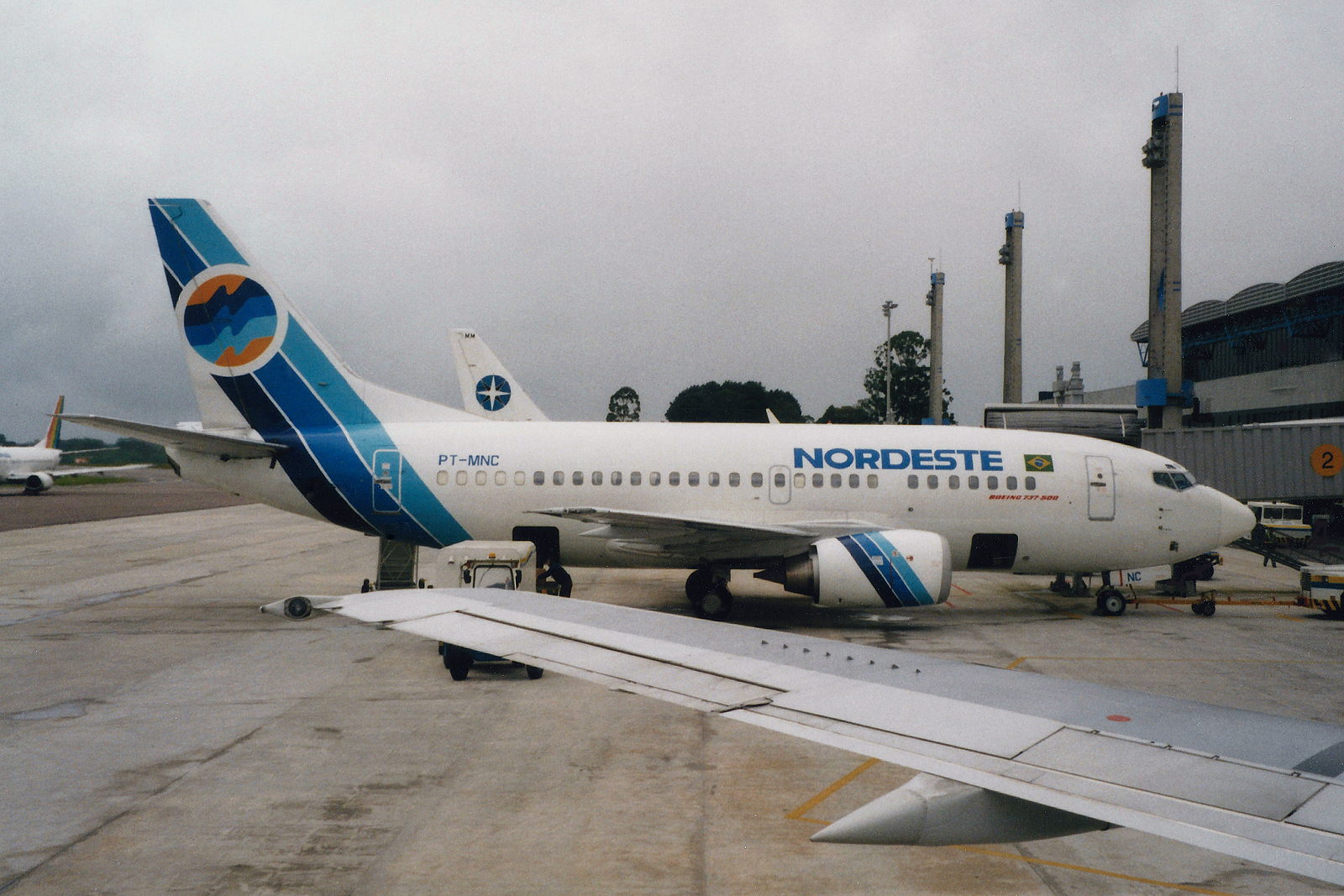
A Nordeste Boeing 737-500 at Afonso Pena International Airport in 1996

On 11 November 1975, the Brazilian Federal Government created the Brazilian Integrated System of Regional Air Transportation and divided the country into five different regions, for which five newly created regional airlines received a concession to operate air services. Nordeste was the second of those regional airlines to be made operational. Its services started on 25 June 1976 and its operational area comprised roughly the Northeast and parts of the Southeast regions of Brazil, specifically the states of Piauí, Ceará, Rio Grande do Norte, Paraíba, Pernambuco, Alagoas, Sergipe, Bahia and parts of Maranhão, Minas Gerais, and Espírito Santo plus the possibility of serving the cities of Rio de Janeiro, São Paulo, and Brasília when linking them to its area of concession.

Originally, Nordeste was formed by the Bahia state government which provided two-thirds of the start-up capital, and Transbrasil which provided one-third.

In 1995, Nordeste was bought and incorporated by Rio Sul Serviços Aéreos Regionais, an airline owned by Ruben Berta Foundation, a foundation that also owned Varig. Finally, in 2002, the administration of Varig, Rio-Sul, and Nordeste was unified, although the Ruben Berta Foundation kept the three brand names independent. At that time, the brands Nordeste and Rio Sul provided feeder services to Varig.

On 17 June 2005, Varig including its former subsidiaries requested to be placed under bankruptcy protection and to begin a recovery process. The request was granted on 22 June 2005.

As part of this process, the airline was divided into two portions, informally known as "old" Varig and "new" Varig. "Old" Varig was judicially known as Viação Aérea Rio-grandense. "New" Varig, judicially known as VRG Linhas Aéreas, is a new airline formed with some assets of the original Varig and which was auctioned on 14 July 2006. The legal procedures were finalized on 20 July 2006. Since that day VRG Linhas Aéreas and Viação Aérea Rio-grandense have been different judicial entities and airlines.

At the time of the auction, the assets of VRG Linhas Aéreas comprised the brands Varig and Rio Sul, Varig's route rights, all aircraft but one, and the Smiles mileage program. VRG Linhas Aéreas was bought by VarigLog. On 28 March 2007, VarigLog sold "new" Varig to Gol Transportes Aéreos, which presently operates the brand Varig and retains but does not operate the brand Rio Sul.

"Old" Varig retained the brand of Nordeste and its IATA code, one aircraft, debts, liabilities, legal disputes, and various assets, concessions and properties of the original Varig. Since "old Varig" could not use the brand name Varig anymore, it used the brand name Nordeste Linhas Aéreas. Later, on 23 October 2007, the brand name was changed to Flex Linhas Aéreas.

Between 17 June 2005 and 2 September 2009, Viação Aérea Rio-Grandense, operator of the brand Nordeste and later Flex, remained in Recovery Order in the 1st Business Court of Rio de Janeiro, under the leadership of Judges Luiz Roberto Ayoub and Miguel Dau. Since bankruptcy protection was lifted, the administration of the airline returned to its original owner, Fundação Ruben Berta. "Old" Varig went on a BRL4 billion (USD2,1 billion, EUR1,5 billion) judicial dispute with the Federal Government of Brazil, a sum that corresponded to approximately 50% of its debts. The question is under analysis at the Federal Supreme Court and the airline has already won the case in all other instances. Furthermore, the financial problems of "old Varig" persist, including momentary failure to pay the due insurance costs of its sole aircraft and leasing fees to the owner of the aircraft.

On November 10, 2009, the director Aurélio Penelas was replaced by Carlos Berardinelli, who was able to reach an agreement with the lessor weeks later.

As a result of accumulated debts of around BRL10 billion (USD5,7 billion, EUR4,5 billion), on August 20, 2010, at the request of the administrator, the 1st Business Court of Rio de Janeiro declared Flex, which included the remaining assets of Nordeste, bankrupt and initiated the process of liquidation.

== Destinations ==
Nordeste Linhas Aéreas Regionais operated services (in its own right) to the following domestic scheduled destinations (in January 2005): Porto Seguro, Salvador and São Paulo.

== Fleet ==
At the time of shut-down, Nordeste had a fleet of five aircraft.

== Accidents and incidents ==
- 9 October 1985: an Embraer EMB110C Bandeirante registration PT-GKA operating a cargo flight from Vitória da Conquista to Salvador da Bahia crashed during initial climb from Vitória da Conquista after flying unusually low. The two crew members died.
- 11 November 1991: an Embraer EMB110P1 Bandeirante registration PT-SCU operating flight 115 from Recife to Maceió, Aracaju and Salvador da Bahia, during an initial climb had an engine failure followed by fire. The aircraft crashed in a populated area. All 13 occupants of the aircraft and 2 persons on the ground died.
- 3 February 1992: an Embraer EMB 110 Bandeirante registration PT-TBB operating flight 092 from Salvador da Bahia to Guanambi, descended below minimum levels in bad weather and crashed on a hill hidden by clouds near Caetité. All 12 passengers and crew aboard died.

== See also ==
- Rio Sul Serviços Aéreos Regionais
- Varig
- Flex Linhas Aéreas
- List of defunct airlines of Brazil

== Bibliography ==
- Beting, Gianfranco; Beting, Joelmir (2009). Varig: Eterna Pioneira. Porto Alegre and São Paulo: EDIPUCRS and Beting Books. ISBN 978-85-7430-901-9.
- Pereira, Aldo (1987). Breve História da Aviação Comercial Brasileira. Rio de Janeiro: Europa.
