= Rio Sul Serviços Aéreos Regionais =

Airline of Brazil (1976–2006)

IATA	ICAO	Call sign
SL	RSL	RIOSUL
- Founded: 24 August 1976
- Commenced operations: 8 September 1976
- Ceased operations: 20 July 2006
- Hubs: Porto Alegre; Rio de Janeiro–Santos Dumont; São Paulo–Congonhas
- Frequent-flyer program: Smiles
- Alliance: Star Alliance (affiliate; 1997–2006)
- Subsidiaries: Nordeste (1995–2002)
- Parent company: Varig
- Headquarters: Rio de Janeiro, Brazil
- Website: www.voeriosul.com.br rio-sul.com/home.htm

Rio-Sul Serviços Aéreos Regionais S/A was a regional airline headquartered in Rio de Janeiro, Brazil, operating scheduled services to southern Brazil. Its main base was São Paulo–Congonhas Airport, with hubs at Porto Alegre Airport and Santos Dumont Airport.

== History ==
Rio Sul logo from 1976 to 1998

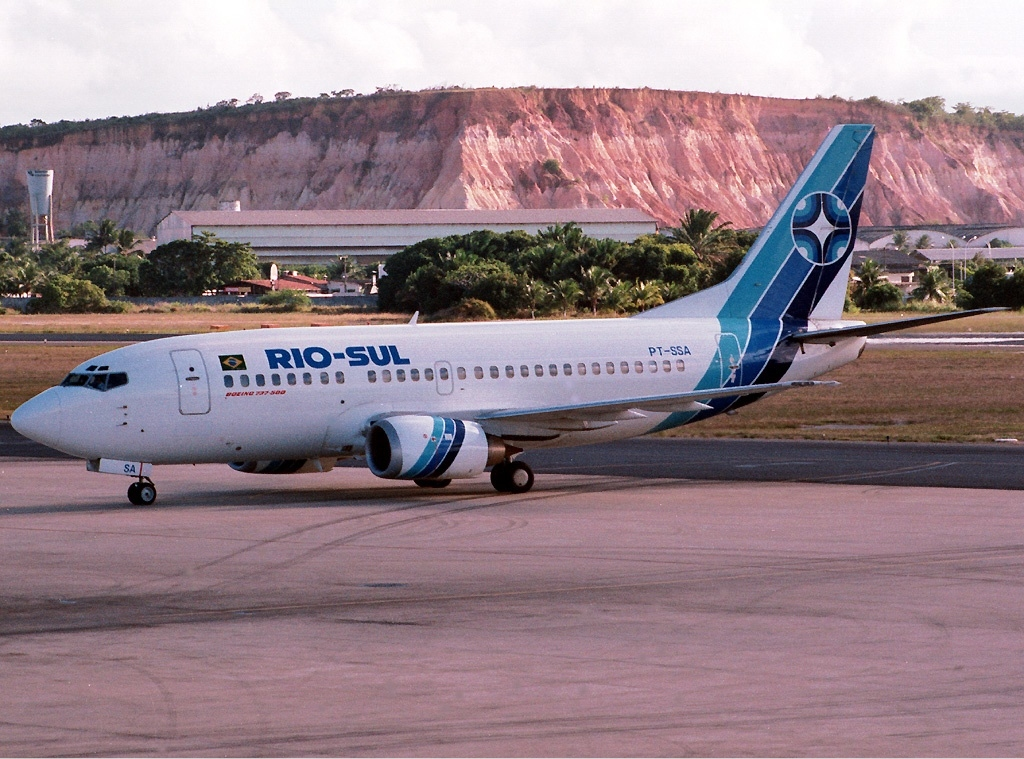
A Rio Sul Boeing 737-500 at Recife Airport in 1998

On November 11, 1975, the Brazilian Federal Government created the Brazilian Integrated System of Regional Air Transportation and divided the country into five different regions, for which five newly created regional airlines received a concession to operate air services. Rio Sul was the fourth of those regional airlines to be made operational. Founded on August 24, 1976, Rio Sul had its services start on September 8, 1976. Its operational area comprised roughly the Southern and parts of the Southeast regions of Brazil, specifically the states of Rio Grande do Sul, Santa Catarina, Paraná, Rio de Janeiro, and parts of São Paulo, and Espírito Santo.

The airline was originally formed by Top Táxi Aéreo, Banco Bradesco, Atlântica-Boavista Insurance, and Varig.

In 2002, the administration of Rio Sul (which included its former subsidiary Nordeste Linhas Aéreas Regionais) was merged with Varig. The brand Rio Sul was part of the assets sold as VRG Linhas Aéreas, although its debts remained under the judicial entity Viação Aérea Rio-Grandense, which uses the brand name Flex Linhas Aéreas. As a result of accumulated debts of around BRL10 billion (US$5,7 billion, EUR4,5 billion), on August 20, 2010, at the request of the administrator, the 1st Business Court of Rio de Janeiro declared Flex, which included the remaining assets of Rio-Sul, bankrupt and initiated the process of liquidation.

== Services ==
Rio Sul operated services to the following scheduled domestic destinations (in January 2005): Caxias do Sul, Belo Horizonte, Brasília, Londrina, Maringá, Passo Fundo, São Paulo and Vitória.

== Fleet ==
Rio Sul consisted of the following aircraft:

Rio Sul Serviços Linhas Aéreos fleet
Aircraft	Total	Introduced	Retired	Notes
Boeing 737-300	4	2000	2007	
Boeing 737-500	21	1992	2007	
Boeing 737-700	5	2001	2004	
Embraer EMB 110 Bandeirante	8	1976	1993	
Embraer EMB 120 Brasilia	17	1989	2003	
Embraer ERJ 145	16	1997	2006	
Fokker F27 Friendship	8	1982	1993	
Fokker 50	10	1992	1999	

== Incidents and accidents ==
According to the Aviation Safety Network's database, Rio Sul Serviços Aéreos Regionais has never experienced a fatal accident in its 26-year-history, though four hull-losses have occurred:

- On May 22, 1982, an Embraer EMB 110 Bandeirante (registration PT-GKC) crashed into a mangrove swamp short of Hercílio Luz International Airport, due to poor visibility. All four people on board survived. The aircraft was damaged beyond repair and written off.
- On August 6, 1984, a Fokker F27 Friendship (registration PT-LCZ) over shot the runway at Santos Dumont Airport. All seven occupants survived, but the aircraft was damaged beyond repair and written off.
- On July 25, 1987, an Embraer EMB 110 Bandeirante (registration PT-GKT) overshot the runway at Santo Angelo Airport. All 13 passengers and crew survived, but the aircraft was damaged beyond repair and written off.
- On December 29, 1998, Rio Sul Flight 310, an Embraer ERJ-145 (registration PT-SPE), was damaged beyond repair when it made a hard landing at Afonso Pena International Airport. All 40 passengers and crew on board survived. Investigators determined that engine power had been reduced just before landing. The aircraft was written off.
- On December 17, 2001, a Boeing 737-500 (registration PT-SSI) operating a scheduled passenger flight from Rio de Janeiro to Belo Horizonte undershot runway 16 at Tancredo Neves International Airport by 70 metres (230 ft) as a result of adverse weather conditions. There were no fatalities. Despite substantial damage, the aircraft was repaired and returned to service. However, nearly 12 years later, the same aircraft would crash in Russia, killing everyone on board.

== See also ==
- List of defunct airlines of Brazil

== Bibliography ==
- Beting, Gianfranco; Beting, Joelmir (2009). Varig: Eterna Pioneira [Varig: Eternal Pioneer] (in Portuguese). Porto Alegre and São Paulo: EDIPUCRS and Beting Books. ISBN 978-85-7430-901-9.
