= Flight 850 =

Flight 850 may refer to

- Varig Flight 850, crashed on 16 August 1957
- Vietnam Airlines Flight 850, hijacked on 4 September 1992
- Swiss International Air Lines Flight 850, crashed on 10 July 2002
