= TAP Maintenance & Engineering =

TAP Maintenance & Engineering – the maintenance, repair and operations center of TAP Air Portugal airline – is located at Portela Airport, Lisbon, Portugal.

== History ==
Created in 1945 as the embryonic maintenance department of the newborn Portuguese national airline. In March 2007, TAP Maintenance & Engineering had 1,830 workers. At its main base, located at Lisbon Airport, there were 1,794 workers; the remainder staffed the outstations of Francisco Sá Carneiro at Porto, Faro Airport at Faro, Madeira Airport at Funchal, Quatro de Fevereiro Airport at Luanda, Angola, Galeão International Airport at Rio de Janeiro and Salgado Filho International Airport, Porto Alegre, Brazil. TAP Maintenance & Engineering, with its owner TAP Portugal, bought 90% of Brazilian VEM Maintenance & Engineering from Varig in November 2005. In January 2009, VEM changed its corporate name to TAP Maintenance & Engineering Brazil.

== TAP M&E capabilities ==
- Airbus A310
- Airbus A318
- Airbus A319
- Airbus A320
- Airbus A321
- Airbus A340
- Boeing 737
- Lockheed L-1011

Engines

- CFM56-3
- CFM56-5A
- CFM56-5B
- CFM56-5C
- CFM56-7
- JT8D
- JT3D
- RB211
- CF6-80

== TAP M&E clients ==
Besides TAP Portugal there are some other airlines that do or did maintenance at TAP Maintenance & Engineering, like:

- FedEx Express A310s
- Air Transat A310s, A330s
- BWIA West Indies Airways A340s
- NATO 707s
- Conviasa A340

== TAP M&E Brazil ==
TAP M&E Brazil (formerly VEM - Varig Maintenance & Engineering) is a company of TAP Portugal Group that is between 10 largest aircraft and component maintenance, repair and overhaul (MRO) companies in the world today.

TAP M&E Brazil has around 2,650 employees distributed among two large Maintenance Centers – at Rio de Janeiro-Galeão and Porto Alegre airports. It has several specialized shops and calibration laboratories. TAP M&E Brazil also provides line maintenance for narrow and wide body aircraft at 35 airports in Brazil.

Its services are certified by the main aeronautical authorities in the world: the ANAC in Brazil, FAA, in United States, EASA, in Europe and those of all countries where it has customers.

TAP M&E Brazil will be included in the proposed privatization package of TAP Portugal.

TAP M&E Brazil has a capability list of more than 10,000 items, and is certified in the following aircraft:

- Boeing 707
- Boeing 727-100/-200
- Boeing 737-200/-300/-400/-500/ NG-700/-800/-900/BBJs
- Boeing 747-100/-200/-300
- Boeing 757
- Boeing 767
- Boeing 777
- McDonnell Douglas DC-10
- McDonnell Douglas MD-11
- Embraer EMB 120 Brasilia
- Embraer ERJ 145 family
- Embraer 170 family
- Embraer Legacy 600
- Fokker 50
- Fokker 100
- Airbus A300
- Airbus A310
- Airbus A320 family
- Airbus A330
- Airbus A340
- Gulfstream III
- Gulfstream IV
- Gulfstream V

Some of TAP M&E Brazil's main clients are:

- Aerolíneas Argentinas
- Air Lease One
- Arrow Cargo
- ATA
- Ansett Worldwide Aviation Services (AWAS)
- Bavaria International Aircraft Leasing (BIAL)
- Boeing
- Centurion Air Cargo
- Copa Airlines
- Embraer
- Euro Atlantic Airways
- Express.Net Airlines
- Força Aérea Brasileira
- Fuerza Aérea del Perú
- GE Capital Aviation Services
- Gemini Air Cargo
- Gol Transportes Aéreos
- Israel Aircraft Industries
- International Lease Finance Corporation
- KD Avia
- Lan Chile
- OceanAir
- Pegasus Air Express
- Passaredo
- Penta
- Pluna
- Santa Barbara Airlines
- Southern Winds Airlines
- TAF Linhas Aéreas
- TAAG Angola Airlines
- TAM Linhas Aéreas
- Thai Airways
- Total S.A.
- Varig
- VarigLog
- WebJet Linhas Aéreas
