= Brotas (neighborhood) =

Neighborhood in Salvador, Bahia, Brazil

Coordinates: 12.986775°S 38.499484°W

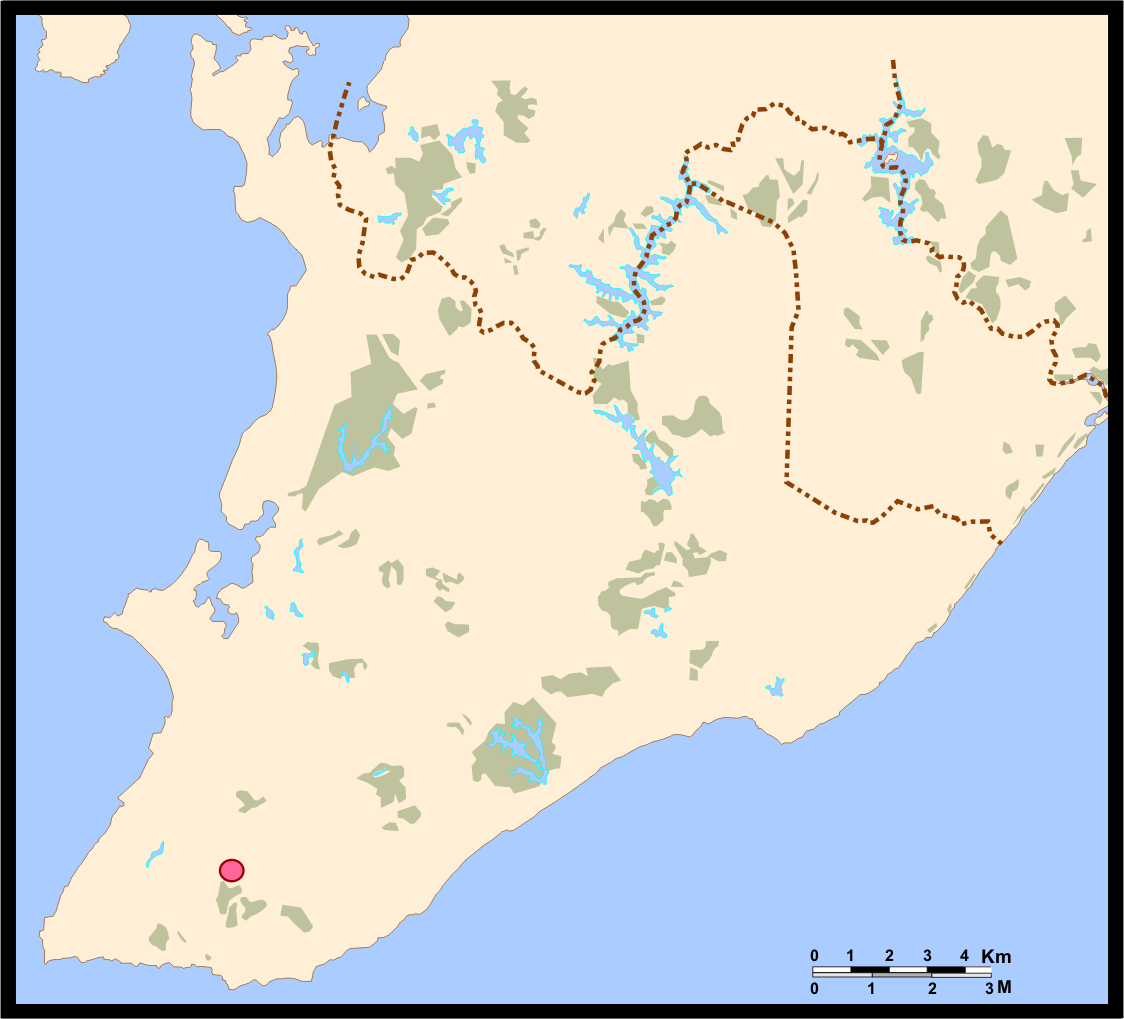
Location of Brotas.

Brotas is a neighborhood located in the western zone of Salvador, Bahia. When Nordeste Linhas Aéreas Regionais existed, its headquarters were in Brotas. It is one of the most populated areas in the Bahian capital and also one of the largest. It is the remnant of the former parish of Brotas, one of the largest in the old system of dividing Salvador into freguesias, and therefore includes several "sub-neighborhoods" within its territory.
