= Flex Linhas Aéreas =

Charter airline of Brazil (2008–2010)

FLEX Linhas Aéreas
IATA	ICAO	Call sign
JH	FFX	FLEX BRASIL
- Founded: November 11, 1975 (as Nordeste Linhas Aéreas Regionais); October 23, 2007 (as Flex Linhas Aéreas)
- Commenced operations: June 26, 1976 (as Nordeste Linhas Aéreas Regionais); 2008 (as Flex Linhas Aéreas)
- Ceased operations: 2010
- Operating bases: Rio de Janeiro/Galeão International Airport
- Fleet size: 1
- Destinations: Charters
- Parent company: Ruben Berta Foundation
- Headquarters: Rio de Janeiro, Brazil
- Key people: Carlos Berardinelli (Director)
- Website: www.voeflex.com.br

Flex Linhas Aéreas, styled as FLEX, was a Brazilian non-regular charter airline based at Rio de Janeiro/Galeão International Airport. It is the brand name of Nordeste Linhas Aéreas S.A., judicial successor of former Viação Aérea Rio-Grandense, known as Varig. Informally Flex is known as "old Varig". The rebranding was necessary because since July 20, 2006 the brand Varig belonged to a different judicial entity. Flex was declared bankrupt on August 20, 2010.

== History ==
The history of Flex Linhas Aéreas is intimately related to that of Varig, since Flex was the judicial successor of Varig.

On 17 June 2005 the airline Varig requested to be placed under bankruptcy protection and to begin a recovery process. The request was granted on 22 June 2005.

As part of this process, the airline was divided into two portions, informally known as "old" Varig and "new" Varig. "Old" Varig was judicially known as Viação Aérea Rio-Grandense. "New" Varig, judicially known as VRG Linhas Aéreas, was a new airline formed with some assets of the original Varig, and which was auctioned on 14 July 2006. The legal procedures were finalized on 20 July 2006. Since that day VRG Linhas Aéreas and Viação Aérea Rio-Grandense were different legal entities and airlines.

At the time of the auction, the assets of VRG Linhas Aéreas comprised the brands Varig and Rio Sul Serviços Aéreos, Varig's route rights, all aircraft but one, and the Smiles mileage program. VRG Linhas Aéreas was bought by VarigLog. On 28 March 2007 VarigLog sold "new Varig" to Gol Transportes Aéreos, which presently operates the brand Varig.

Viação Aérea Rio Grandense, informally known as "old Varig", retained the brand of Varig's former subsidiary Nordeste Linhas Aéreas Regionais, the IATA code of Nordeste, one aircraft, debts, liabilities, legal disputes, and various assets, concessions and properties of the original Varig. Since "old Varig" could not use the name Varig (brand and judicial name) anymore, its official judicial denomination changed to Nordeste Linhas Aéreas S.A.

In order to give an image of new start, the brand name Flex was chosen. This name was unveiled on 23 October 2007 during the Brazilian Travel Agents Congress, ABAV, in Rio de Janeiro. The first flight under the new brand, a charter return flight between Rio de Janeiro Galeão-Antonio Carlos Jobim International Airport and Salvador-Deputado Luís Eduardo Magalhães International Airport, took place on 8 March 2008.

Between 17 June 2005 and 2 September 2009, Viação Aérea Rio-Grandense and later its successor since 2007, known by the brand Flex, remained in Recovery Order in the 1st Business Court of Rio de Janeiro, under the leadership of Judges Luiz Roberto Ayoub and Miguel Dau. After the bankruptcy protection was lifted, the administration of the airline could have returned to its original owner, Fundação Ruben Berta, which still owned 87% of the shares of Varig. However, Fundação Ruben Berta preferred to keep a judicial administrator.

On 18 August 2009, Flex Linhas Aéreas had its authorization to operate non-regular passenger, cargo and postal services renewed for one year by the Brazilian Civil Aviation Agency (ANAC). Therefore, Flex operated flights on behalf of other airlines, as contracted. As part of the decisions made during the 2006 split, VRG Linhas Aéreas ("new Varig", owner of the brands Varig and Gol), was obliged to purchase from Flex a minimum of 140 hours worth of services per month. For this reason, some of VRG Linhas Aéreas flights, usually two flights a day, were operated by Flex under Gol flight numbers. This agreement ended in 2009.

In 2009 Flex was in a BRL4 billion (US$2.1 billion, EUR1.5 billion) judicial dispute with the Federal Government of Brazil, a sum that corresponded to approximately 50% of its debts. The question was still before the Federal Supreme Court at a time when the airline had already won the cause in all other instances. Furthermore, Flex's financial problems persisted, including momentary failure to pay the due insurance costs of its sole aircraft and leasing fees to the aircraft's owner, which led to the grounding of the aircraft between November 1 and November 27, 2009.

On November 10, 2009 the director, Aurélio Penelas, was replaced by Carlos Berardinelli, who was able to reach an agreement with the lessor weeks later and Flex could fly again. However, on February 1, 2010, the Flex aircraft was grounded again for delays in payment of insurance and leasing fees.

As a result of accumulated debts of around BRL10 billion (US$5.7 billion, EUR4.5 billion), on August 20, 2010, at the request of the administrator, the 1st Business Court of Rio de Janeiro declared Flex bankrupt and initiated the process of liquidation. However, on September 10, the bankruptcy process was suspended at the request of Ruben Berta Foundation and the company returned in practical terms to recovery order status until the validity of the bankruptcy was to be judged.

== Destinations ==
Flex Linhas Aéreas operated non-regular passenger, cargo and postal services on behalf of other airlines, as contracted, Gol being its main client. For this reason, some VRG Linhas Aéreas flights were operated by Flex under Gol flight numbers.

== Fleet ==
The fleet of Flex Linhas Aéreas included the following aircraft in August 2010:

Flex Linhas Aéreas fleet
Aircraft	Total	Notes
Boeing 737-300	1	Ex-Varig

This sole aircraft is now parked at the aircraft junkyard at the Opa-Locka Executive Airport in Miami, Florida.

As of June 2018, the aircraft is reported scrapped.

== Flex Aviation and Flex Communication Services ==
FLEX Linhas Aéreas offered training for activities related to the air transport industries at the Flex Aviation Center (FAC), with schools located in São Paulo and Rio de Janeiro. It commissioned and trained pilots, flight crew, flight operational, dispatchers operational, specialists in flight safety, onsite staff to airports and shops, handling of cargo, and management courses. Its courses were recognized by organizations such as IATA and ICAO.

Flex Linhas Aéreas provided services to Aerodrome Flight Information Service (AFIS), and Meteorology Service (MET) and Airport Information Service (AIS) at several airports in Brazil through the Flex Communication Center (FCC). FCC served, among others: TAM Airlines, VRG Linhas Aéreas (operator of Gol and Varig brands), VarigLog, Avianca Brasil, NHT Linhas Aéreas, and Embraer. After the bankruptcy on August 20, 2010, this service was taken over by TRIP Linhas Aéreas.

== See also ==
- List of defunct airlines of Brazil
