= Aero Geral =

Brazilian airline

- Founded: 1941
- Ceased operations: 1952
- Key people: E. J. McLaren; Custódio Netto Junior; Joaquim Fontes

Aero Geral Ltda was a Brazilian airline founded in 1941. It was bought and merged into Varig in 1952.

== History ==
Aero Geral Ltda was founded in 1941 in the Amazon region and started flying with a single Monocoupe 90A in February 1942. However, due to technical difficulties, it was grounded in 1944 and became operational again only in January 1947. In 1947, Edgar James McLaren, a former pilot of Panair do Brasil planned to start regular services in the Amazon region using amphibian aircraft. McLaren hoped to replace Panair, should the airline decide to end its services on the region, which did not happen.

McLaren found new business associates Custódio Netto Junior, also former pilot of Panair do Brasil, and Joaquim Fontes former station manager of Cruzeiro do Sul in Natal, and together they re-created the airline. Aero Geral was then authorized to operate regular flights between Natal and Santos along the coast. Services started in March 1947 using four amphibian Catalinas. In the following years a Curtiss C-46 Commando and two Douglas DC-3 were added to the fleet.

On February 29, 1952 Aero Geral was sold to Varig. Varig thus greatly enlarged its operations in Brazil, extending services beyond Rio de Janeiro until Natal and could better face competition with Panair do Brasil and Cruzeiro do Sul.

== Fleet ==
Aero Geral fleet
Aircraft	Total	Years of operation	Notes
Monocoupe 90A	1	1942–1944	
Consolidated PBY-5A/6A Catalina	5	1947–1952	
Curtiss C-46 Commando	1	1949–1952	
Douglas DC-3/C-47	2	1950–1952	

== Accidents and incidents ==
- 2 June 1951: a Consolidated PBY-5A/6A Catalina registration PP-AGC flying from Recife to Salvador da Bahia crashed near Palame, Sergipe. Two crew members died.

== See also ==
- List of defunct airlines of Brazil
