= Varig Flight 850 =

1957 plane crash in the Atlantic Ocean

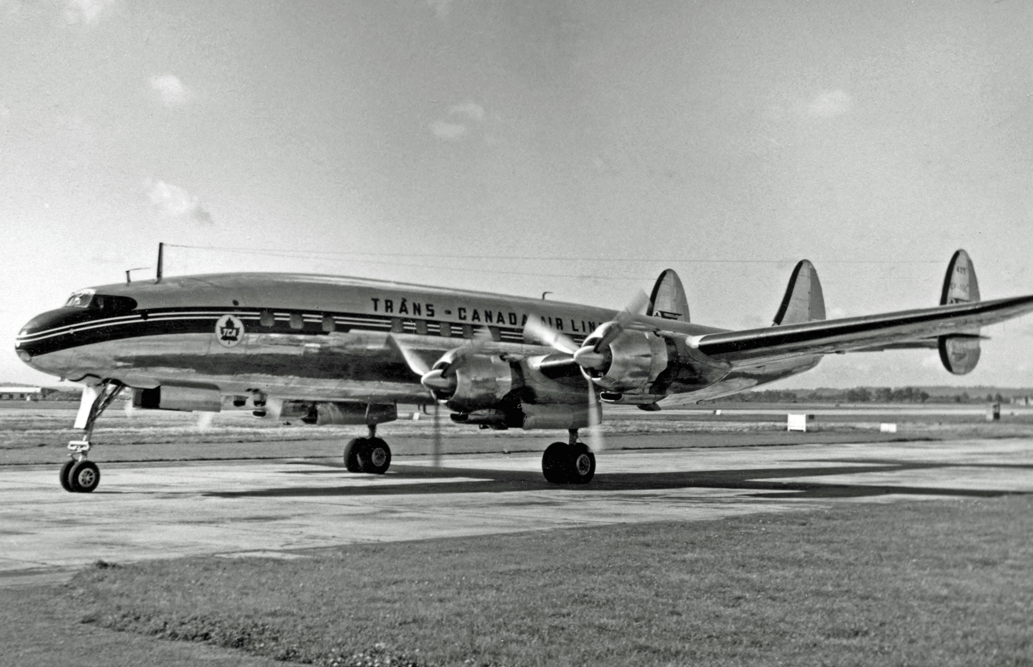
- A Lockheed Super Constellation, similar to the accident aircraft

Occurrence
- Date: August 16, 1957
- Summary: In-flight damage to three engines
- Site: Atlantic Ocean, next to Santo Domingo, Dominican Republic; 19°45′41.7″N 70°24′16.3″W

Aircraft
- Aircraft type: Lockheed L-1049G Super Constellation
- Operator: Varig
- Registration: PP-VDA
- Flight origin: Salgado Filho International Airport, Porto Alegre
- 1st stopover: Congonhas Airport
- 2nd stopover: Galeão International Airport
- 3rd stopover: Belém International Airport
- 4th stopover: Ciudad Trujillo-General Andrews International Airport
- Last stopover: Miami International Airport
- Destination: New York Idlewild International Airport, New York City, United States
- Occupants: 11
- Crew: 11
- Fatalities: 1
- Survivors: 10

Varig Flight 850 was a scheduled international passenger flight operated by now-defunct Brazilian airline Varig. The flight itinerary was departure from Salgado Filho International Airport, in Porto Alegre, Brazil, with the final destination being John. F. Kennedy International Airport in New York City, United States. Between the two cities, stopovers were scheduled in São Paulo, Rio de Janeiro, Belém, Ciudad Trujillo (now Santo Domingo), and Miami.

On August 14, 1957, the flight departed from Porto Alegre. In the late morning of August 16, 1957, 50 minutes after take-off from Ciudad Trujillo-General Andrews International Airport in the Dominican Republic, with only 11 crew members, the pilots were forced to make an emergency landing in the Atlantic Ocean after losing two engines; number 3 and 4, the aircraft had taken off with engine number 2 shut down. During the emergency landing, the tail detached from the plane, causing the death of a flight attendant.

== Aircraft ==
The aircraft was a Lockheed L-1049 Super Constellation, built in 1955 with factory number 4610. The machine was handed over to Varig and given the aircraft registration PP-VDA. The four-engine long-haul aircraft was equipped with four air-cooled, 18-cylinder double radial Wright R-3350 Duplex-Cyclone engines.

Varig had a fleet of three Super Constellations at the time for flights to the United States; the aircraft model was known to have fragile propeller engines, which frequently failed.

== Flight ==
On August 14, 1957, the aircraft took off from Salgado Filho International Airport, in Porto Alegre. It was piloted by Captain Geraldo Knippling and was bound for New York City in the United States, with stopovers planned in São Paulo, Rio de Janeiro, Belém, Ciudad Trujilo (now Santo Domingo), and Miami.

At 2:00 am on August 16, 1957, shortly after take-off from Belém, engine number 2 on the left wing suddenly lost power. Despite the incident, the crew was able to land without incident for their scheduled stopover at Ciudad Trujillo-General Andrews International Airport in Santo Domingo, Dominican Republic. After landing, the company reallocated the passengers to other flights.

As there was no replacement engine available in the Dominican Republic, the airline instructed the crew to fly to New York without any passengers to have the engine replaced there. The aircraft took off with a crew of 11 and the no. 2 propeller feathered at 15:16 GMT on August 16, 1957, headed towards Miami International Airport. According to reports by Captain Knippling in his book, where he narrated the whole story, he had to use the entire runway for takeoff, and he had difficulties reaching the cruising altitude due to the failed engine.

=== Accident ===
After 50 minutes, at 3,000 meters, already close to cruising altitude, engine number 4 began to overspeed. The pilot was ultimately unable to control or feather the propeller, and the propeller came off the engine and damaged engine number 3 right next to it. What was left of engine 4 was on fire, but the pilot activated the extinguisher and the flames were put out.

At this point, only engine number 1 was still operable and the plane began losing altitude. The pilots, with no airfield in sight, decided to ditch the aircraft at sea, around 500 meters from the coast of Cabarete, in the northern Dominican Republic province of Puerto Plata. The forced landing was relatively successful, with the plane initially remaining on the surface long enough for the crew to escape. However, the tail had detached from the aircraft on impact, and one flight attendant who was sitting in the back of the plane died. The life raft used by the crew was pushed to shore by waves and wind within a few hours and they were rescued by people on the beach.

== See also ==
- Varig Flight 820
- Varig Flight 254
