= Varig =

Airline of Brazil (1927–2006)

VARIG – Viação Aérea Rio-Grandense S.A.
- Logo used from 2007

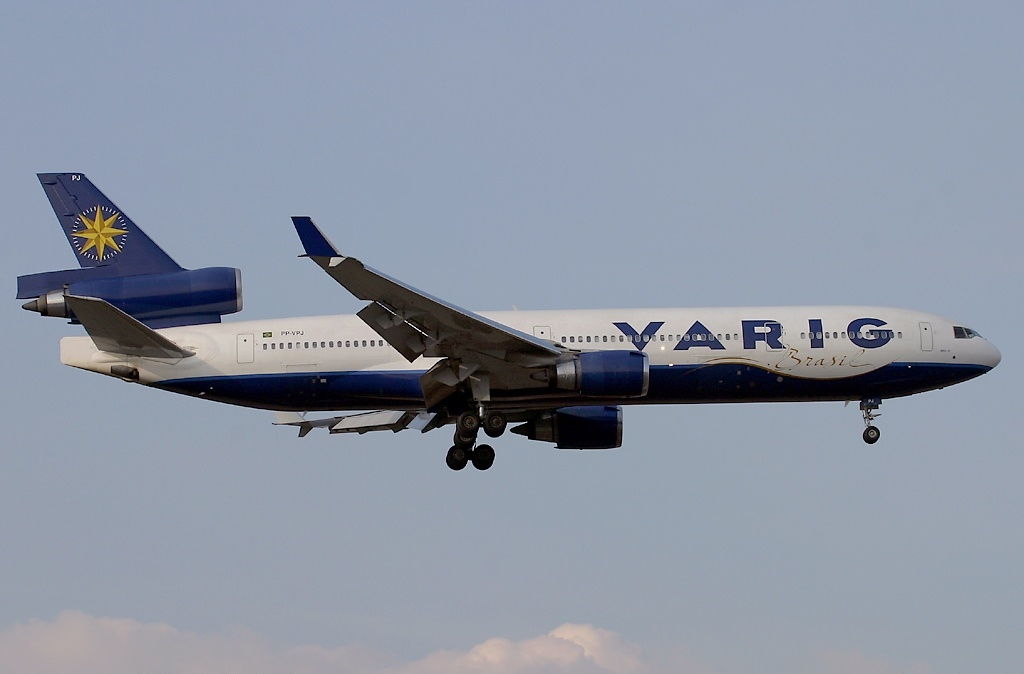
- A Varig McDonnell Douglas MD-11
IATA	ICAO	Call sign
RG	VRG	VARIG
- Founded: 7 May 1927 (Porto Alegre, Rio Grande do Sul, Brazil)
- Ceased operations: 20 July 2006 (merged with Gol Linhas Aéreas Inteligentes)
- Hubs: Rio de Janeiro/Galeão International Airport
- Frequent-flyer program: Smiles
- Alliance: Star Alliance (1997–2007)
- Subsidiaries: Cruzeiro; PLUNA; Rio Sul; Nordeste
- Headquarters: Rio de Janeiro
- Key people: List: Otto Ernst Meyer; Ruben Berta; Erik de Carvalho; Hélio Smidt; Fernando Pinto

Varig (Viação Aérea Rio-Grandense, 'Rio Grandean Airways') was the first airline founded in Brazil, in 1927. From 1965 until 1990, it was Brazil's leading airline and virtually its only international one. In 2005, Varig went into judicial restructuring, and in 2006 it was split into two companies: Flex Linhas Aéreas, informally known as "old" Varig, heir to the original airline, now defunct; and "new" Varig, a new company, fully integrated into Gol Linhas Aéreas Inteligentes.

== History ==
=== Formation and early years (1927–1943) ===
Sociedade Anônima Empresa de Viação Aérea Rio-Grandense – VARIG was the first national airline established in Brazil. It was founded on 7 May 1927, in Porto Alegre, by Otto Ernst Meyer-Labastille, a German aviator decorated in World War I, who immigrated to Brazil in 1921 and noticed how necessary air transportation was for a large country like Brazil. Varig was an off-spring of the German trade company and airline Condor Syndikat, thus sharing the same origin as Syndicato Condor, later renamed Serviços Aéreos Cruzeiro do Sul. Condor Syndikat gave the initial operational and financial support, and for a short time Varig and the sister-company Syndicato Condor operated in partnership.

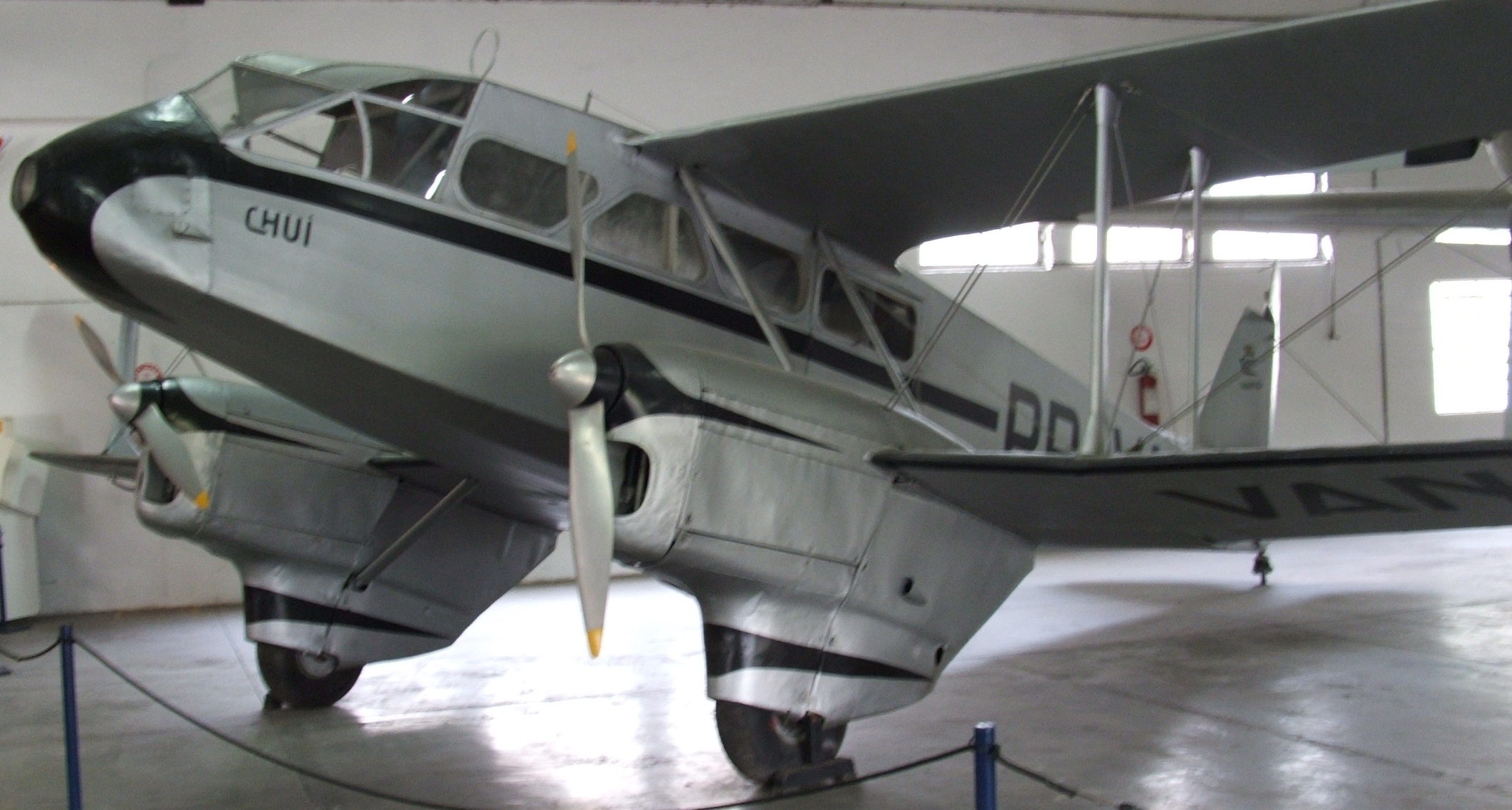
de Havilland DH.89 Dragon Rapide PP-VAN exhibited at the MUSAL

The first aircraft of VARIG was a ten-passenger Dornier Do J Wal flying boat, transferred from the assets of Condor Syndikat. This aircraft, named Atlântico, was also the first aircraft registered in Brazil as P-BAAA. Operations started on 22 June 1927 with a flight from Porto Alegre to Rio Grande via Pelotas. Varig inherited the route rights from Condor Syndikat which since 22 February 1927 had operated the service.

VARIG slowly but consistently in spite of difficulties added aircraft and destinations to its network initially focusing on the state of Rio Grande do Sul. On 5 August 1942, Varig began its first international route from Porto Alegre to Montevideo using its de Havilland DH 89 Dragon Rapide.

In 1941, as the United States declared war against the Axis and joined the Allies in the conflict, aviation supplies became scarce, particularly in terms of petrol and replacement parts. Because it used mostly German equipment and had a German manager-director (president), Varig faced particular difficulties. For this reason, Varig's first manager-director Otto Ernst Meyer resigned on 24 December 1941 and shareholders decided that the next manager-director had to be a native-born Brazilian. Érico de Assis Brasil was chosen but he died on an aircraft accident shortly after. It was in 1943 that Varig's first employee, Ruben Martin Berta, a descendant of Hungarian and German grandparents, was chosen as manager-director, a post he would retain until his death in 1966.

=== Expansion (1943–1966) ===
Revenue passenger-kilometers, scheduled flights only, in millions
Year	Traffic
1950	66
1955	248
1960	603
1965	1586
1969	2504
1975	5826
1980	8104
1985	10072
1995	20877
2000	26286

One of the first decisions of Ruben Berta was to pursue an expansion plan and to unify the fleet around only one type of aircraft. The chosen one was the Lockheed L-10 Electra. Another ground-breaking suggestion was made on 29 October 1945, when, based on social ideas found on the papal encyclicals Rerum novarum and Quadragesimo anno and on Jean-Jacques Rousseau's The Social Contract, Berta proposed and the assembly approved the transfer of 50% of Varig's shares to a not-for-profit foundation belonging to the employees. The aim of the foundation was to provide health, financial, social and recreational benefits to its employees. Decades later, this foundation would be called Fundação Ruben Berta.

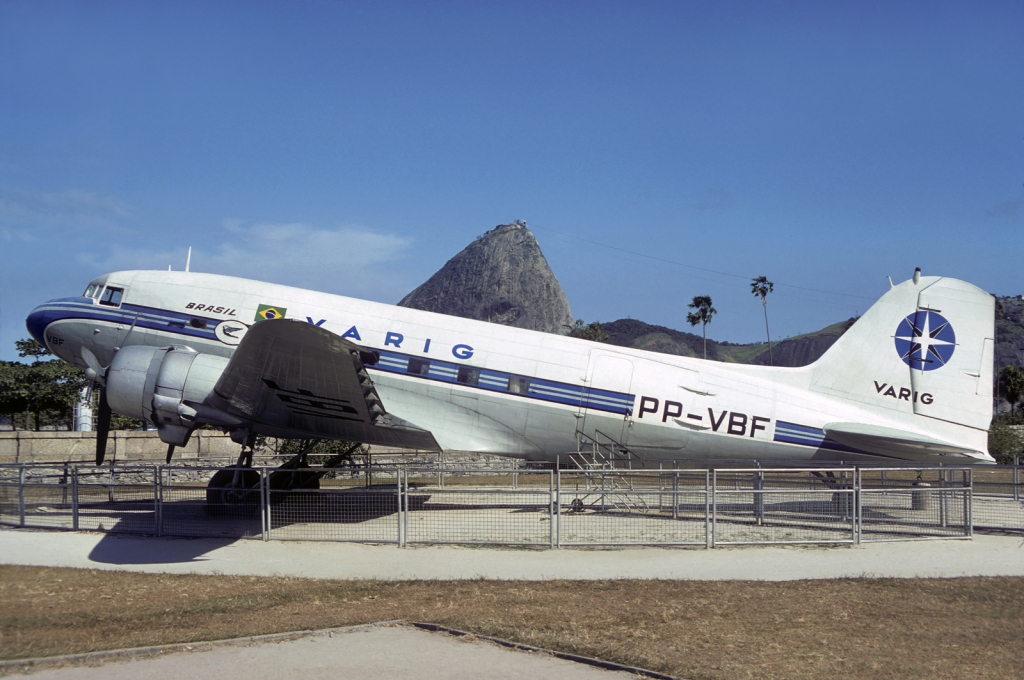
A Douglas DC 3 displayed in full colors in Rio de Janeiro

In 1946, with the addition of Douglas DC-3 and later the Curtiss C-46 to its fleet, Varig was able to greatly increase its network by adding cities in the states of Santa Catarina, Paraná, São Paulo, and Rio de Janeiro, facing fierce competition with Real Transportes Aéreos and SAVAG. On 29 February 1952, Varig bought Aero Geral, a small airline with concessions to fly from Natal to Santos. With this purchase, Varig greatly enlarged its operations in Brazil, extending services beyond Rio de Janeiro to Natal along the Brazilian coast and was thus better prepared to compete with Panair do Brasil and Cruzeiro do Sul. In 1949, the Brazilian government granted Varig the concession to fly to the United States, since the original airline that had the concession, Cruzeiro do Sul, was unable to operate the services. The inaugural flight between Rio de Janeiro–Galeão and New York–Idlewild (later renamed John F. Kennedy International Airport) was on 2 August 1955. The services were operated using three new Lockheed L-1049G Super Constellations. On 30 May 1953, flights to Buenos Aires using Curtiss C-46s started. In January 1956, Varig served 55 cities in Brazil and four abroad, being the second Brazilian airline in terms of passengers transported.

In 1954, sensing the need for more modern aircraft, new Convair 240s were purchased. The addition of the Lockheed Super Constellation and the Convair 240 provoked a deep change of mentality in the culture of Varig, with the introduction of a more cosmopolitan corporate image that would remain until 1996.

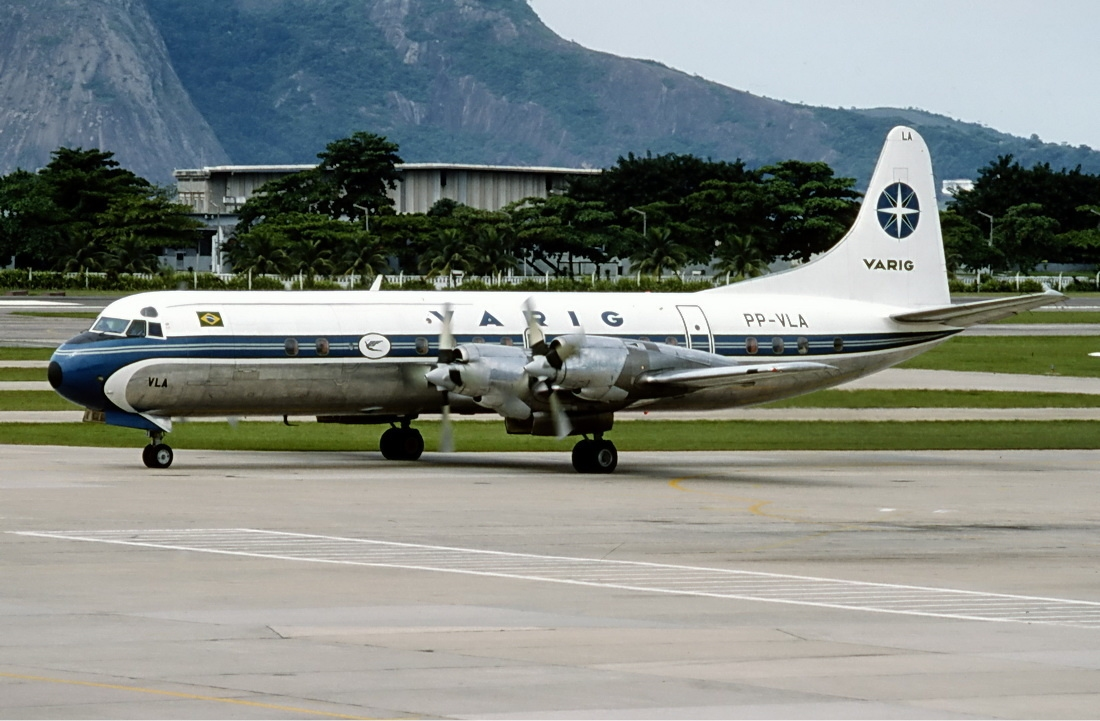
A Lockheed L-188 Electra at Rio de Janeiro–Santos Dumont Airport in 1991

Logo used between 1961 and 1996.

On 6 July 1959, Varig, Cruzeiro do Sul and VASP initiated air shuttle services between Rio de Janeiro–Santos Dumont and São Paulo–Congonhas airports, the first of its kind in the world. The three companies coordinated schedules and operations, and shared revenue. The service was a response to the competition imposed by Real Transportes Aéreos. The idea, baptized as Air bridge (Portuguese: Ponte Aérea), inspired by the Berlin Airlift, was so successful that it was abandoned only in 1999. Flights operated on an hourly basis initially by Convair 240 (Varig), Convair 340 (Cruzeiro) and Saab 90 Scandia (VASP). In a few months the shuttle service led by Varig won the battle against Real, which was bought by Varig in 1961. Sadia Transportes Aéreos joined the service in 1968. Between 1975 and 1992, it was operated exclusively by Varig's Lockheed L-188 Electra which for the sake of neutrality did not have the Varig name on the fuselage.

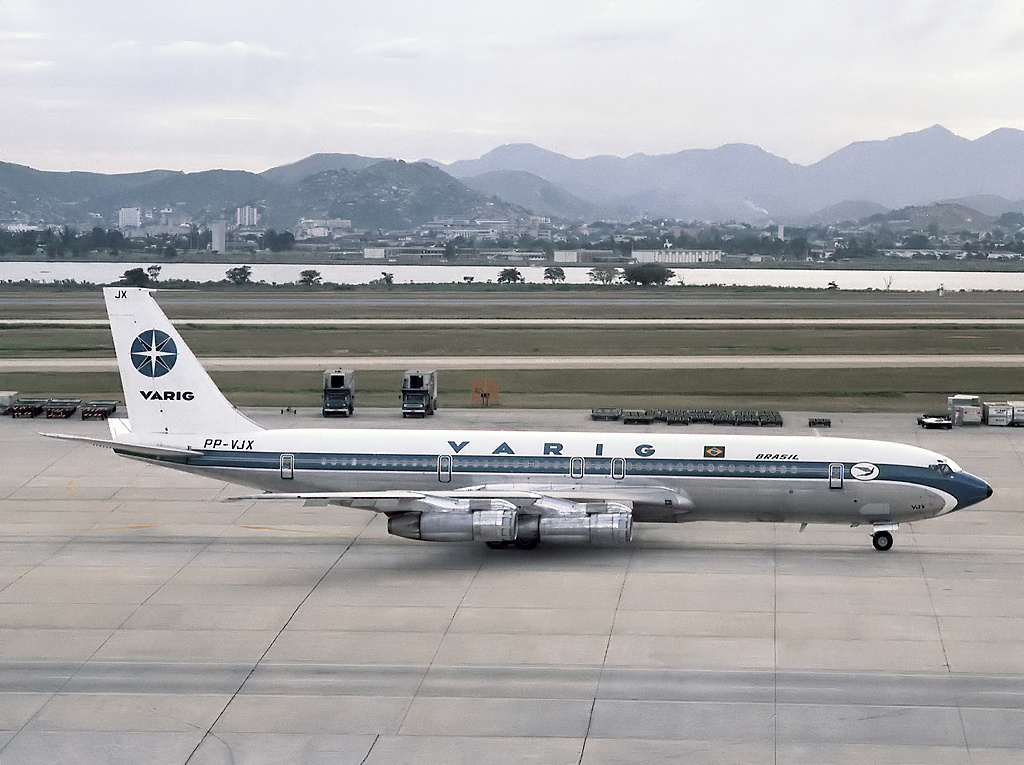
A Boeing 707-345C at Rio de Janeiro–Galeão International Airport in 1984

On 19 December 1959, Varig started to fly their new 35-seat Sud Aviation SE-210 Caravelle I between Brazil and New York–Idlewild, stopping at Belem, Trinidad and Nassau; on 2 July 1960, the Caravelles were replaced by the Boeing 707-441, which could fly from Rio de Janeiro–Galeão to New York–Idlewild nonstop. The Caravelles were switched to operate trunk routes within Brazil and to Buenos Aires–Ezeiza and Montevideo.

Between May and August 1961, after a lengthy battle for the Brazilian market, Varig took over the Consortium Real-Aerovias-Nacional, which was in serious economic difficulty. This purchase not only made Varig the largest airline in South America but also granted rights to other cities in Latin America, Miami, the West Coast of the United States and to Japan.

European services started on 10 February 1965. Varig had been lobbying for European concessions for more than ten years, but after the sudden shutdown of Panair do Brasil by the Brazilian military government, Varig was granted rights previously held by Panair and was ordered to immediately operate all scheduled services, including Panair's flight scheduled to depart that very night from Rio de Janeiro–Galeão to Recife, Lisbon, Paris–Orly and Frankfurt.

Varig also inherited Panair's two Douglas DC-8-33 and the agreement with TAP-Transportes Aéreos Portugueses to operate the Voo da amizade (English: Friendship Flight) between São Paulo–Congonhas, Rio de Janeiro–Galeão and Lisbon, with stops in Recife and Sal, now using Varig's Lockheed L-188 Electra. Originally started on 30 November 1960 by Panair and TAP, only Brazilian and Portuguese citizens or foreigners with permanent residence in Brazil or Portugal were entitled to the purchase of tickets for these flights, which were extremely popular due to their low fares. Those flights operated until 1967.

On 14 December 1966, Rubem Berta died of a heart attack. The following day, the administrative board elected Erik Oswaldo Kastrup de Carvalho, Berta's right-hand and former Panair employee, as Varig's fourth director-president.

=== Consolidation (1966–2000) ===
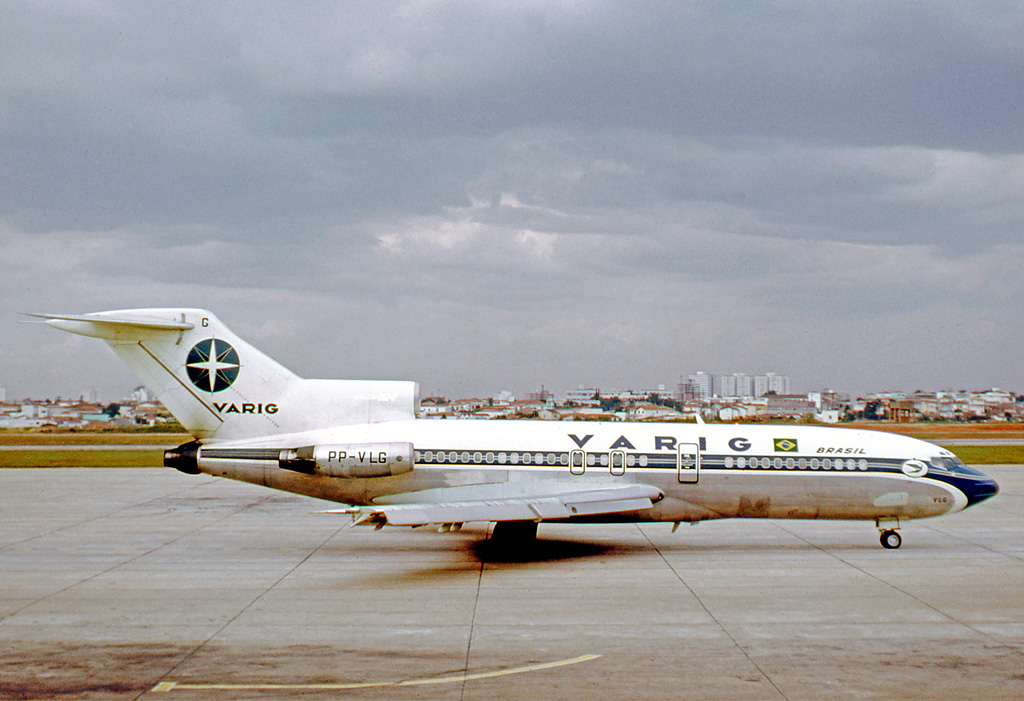
A Boeing 727-41 at São Paulo Congonhas airport in 1972

The 1973 oil crisis brought to Varig the need to replace its older-generation aircraft with newer ones. For international flights, the chosen type was the Douglas DC-10, which had its first flight with Varig on 1 July 1974, and this aircraft had the range to serve European destinations including Paris without a refuelling stop en route. In the domestic arena, gradually the Boeing 737-200 became the work-horse.

Still as a consequence of the 1973 oil crisis which caused many difficulties to airlines, on 20 May 1975 Varig acquired a controlling interest in Cruzeiro do Sul, which was in a particularly delicate economic situation. Cruzeiro do Sul was fully integrated into VARIG on 1 January 1993.

On 11 November 1975, the Brazilian Federal Government created the Brazilian Integrated System of Regional Air Transportation and divided the country in five different regions, for which each of five newly created regional airlines received a concession to operate air services. Rio-Sul Serviços Aéreos Regionais S/A was the fourth of those regional airlines to be made operational, and it was established by Varig in partnership with Top Táxi Aéreo, Bradesco Bank, and Atlântica-Boavista Insurance. Its services started on 8 September 1976 and its operational area comprised roughly the Southern and parts of the Southeast regions of Brazil. Soon Rio-Sul was operating as Varig's feeder-airline.

In February 1979, Carvalho left the presidency of Varig due to serious illness, being succeeded by Harry Schuetz for a short time; by Hélio Smidt, Berta's nephew, in 1980; and by Rubel Thomas in 1990.

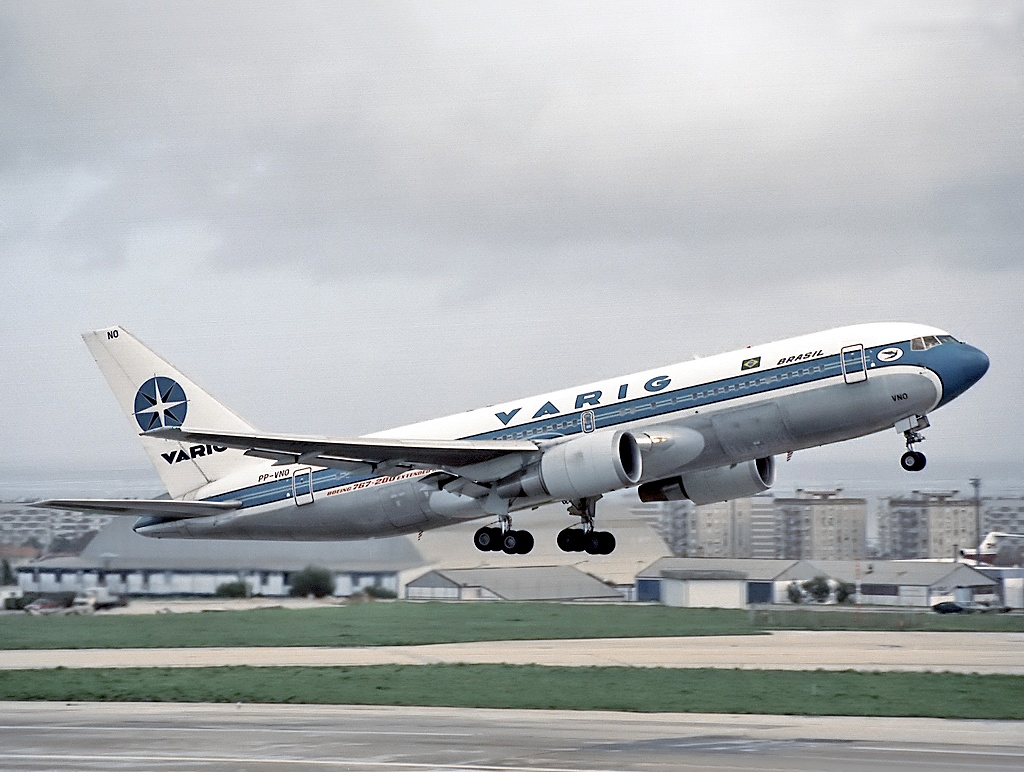
A Boeing 767-200ER from departing Lisbon Portela Airport in 1995

The 1980s were marked by a modernization of the fleet, growth in the number of destinations and increasing financial problems originated in high inflation and in a foreign currency crisis. Furthermore, with the end of the military régime and the return to democracy in 1985, Varig lost its intimate connection with the ruling powers. In 1990, with a gradual deregulation promoted by the Federal Government, VASP and Transbrasil were authorized to fly to international destinations, breaking an almost-monopoly held by Varig since 1965 (Cruzeiro do Sul was the only exception). More international carriers were also authorized to fly to Brazil, greatly increasing competition. Slowly Varig began to lose its financial health, aggravated by the early 1990s world recession and administration problems. In 1988, a few years after the inauguration of São Paulo–Guarulhos International Airport, Varig decided to move its operational hub from Rio de Janeiro to São Paulo.

Varig's final logo before it split up in 2006

In June 1995, Varig bought 49% of the shares of Pluna Uruguayan Airlines. In an attempt to solve its increasing problems, Carlos Willy Engels became president in 1995. In 1996 he was succeeded by Fernando Abs da Cruz Souza Pinto, who would be the last president of the consolidation phase in the history of the company. He developed an ambitious project to bring financial and operational health back to the company. The two most visible milestones of this project were the new corporate image launched on 15 October 1996 - the first change since 1955 - and the membership of Varig in Star Alliance as of 22 October 1997. Varig was its sixth member airline, and the first to join after it was launched only five months earlier.

In spite of some success in the re-organization of the company, Pinto did not have full support of the Ruben Berta Foundation, the controller of Varig and, as a consequence, he left the presidency of Varig on 28 January 2000. That same year he became the CEO of TAP Portugal and successfully re-organized that airline. Pinto was succeeded by Ozires Silva, former president of the Brazilian aircraft manufacturer Embraer.

=== Decline and final split (2000–2006) ===
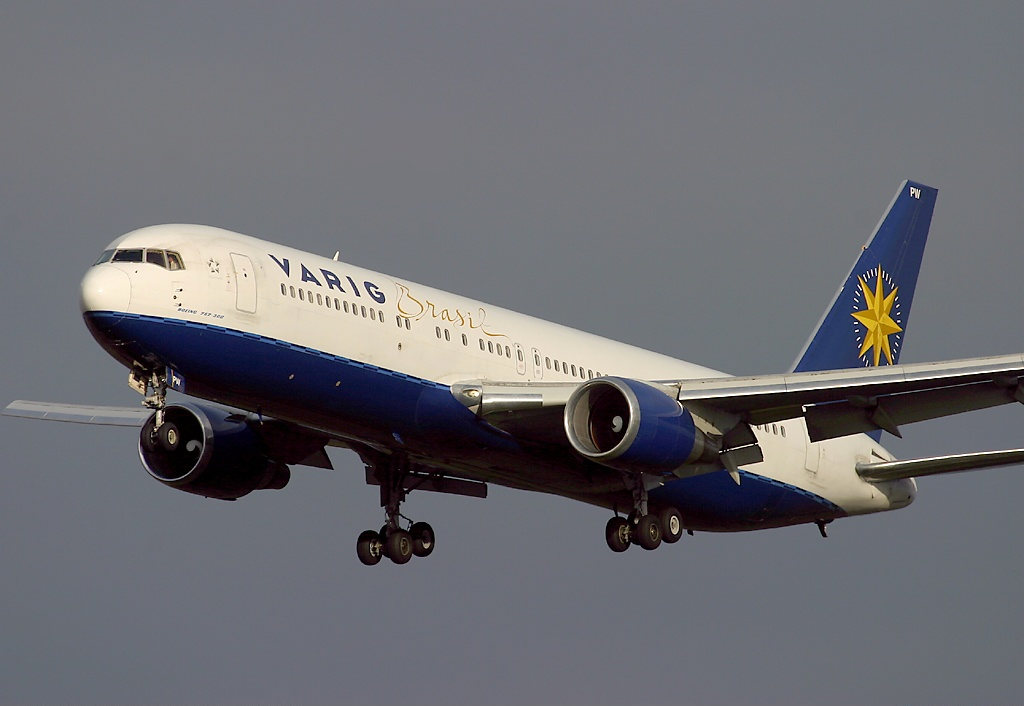
A Boeing 767-300ER ready to land at Frankfurt Airport in 2004

The administration of Ozires Silva, which lasted for only 2.5 years, started with major restructuring in the company, aiming at making the Ruben Berta Foundation more powerful and the president-director weaker. Also, on 28 January 2000, all cargo operations were united under a new airline named VarigLog.

Despite the reforms, Varig posted a net loss for first time in its history: R$148.6 million by the end of 2000, and then R$523 million in the following year.

In 2001, low-cost airline Gol Airlines began operations, with VASP cutting fares in response. The loss of passengers to competitors caused Varig to lose its top position in the domestic market share (in terms of passengers per kilometre) to TAM Airlines, for the first time since 1961. The September 11 attacks also weakened Varig’s operational and financial situation.

In 2002, Ruben Berta Foundation merged the administration of Varig and its subsidiary Rio Sul Serviços Aéreos Regionais (which included the brand Nordeste Linhas Aéreas Regionais). The three brands were used separately with Rio-Sul and Nordeste providing feeder services to Varig.

Year-long discussions to merge Varig with TAM Airlines ended unsuccessfully in 2004 and the same year Varig fell to third place in the Brazilian domestic market share, behind TAM and Gol.

VARIG applied to the Commercial Bankruptcy and Reorganization Court in Rio de Janeiro on 17 June 2005, for the commencement of "judicial reorganization" proceedings pursuant to the New Bankruptcy and Restructuring Law of Brazil (Law 11.101). The request was granted on 22 June 2005. VARIG continued to provide services despite its financial troubles.

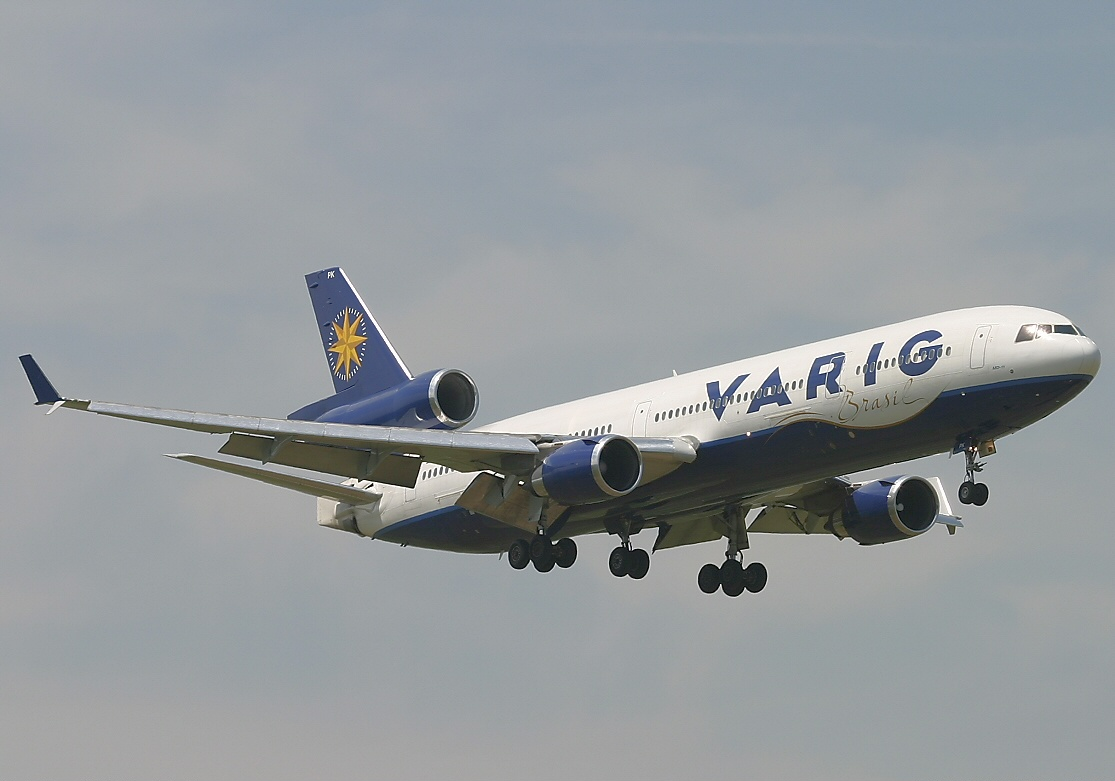
A McDonnell Douglas MD-11 ready to land at Paris Charles de Gaulle Airport in 2004

In order to raise funds, the Bankruptcy and Reorganization Court decided to sell two of Varig's subsidiaries:

- in November 2005 the maintenance centre VEM Maintenance & Engineering was sold to a consortium presided over by the Portuguese airline TAP Portugal.
- in December 2005 the cargo division VarigLog was sold to Volo do Brasil, a consortium started by the private equity fund MatlinPatterson Global Advisors and three Brazilian investors (Marco Antonio Audi, Marco Hapfel and Luiz Gallo). The negotiation was concluded in June 2006.

After two unsuccessful attempts to auction the airline as a whole, the bankruptcy court decided to split the airline in two different judicial entities, informally known as "old" Varig and "new" Varig:

- The first portion, formally called Nordeste Linhas Aéreas S/A and informally known as "old" Varig, comprised the brand Nordeste, one aircraft, debts, liabilities, legal disputes, various assets, concessions and properties of the original Varig. Since "old" Varig, could not use the name Varig anymore, the company used the brand-name Nordeste for a while and in 2008 it began using the name Flex Linhas Aéreas.
- The second portion, formally called VRG Linhas Aéreas and informally known as "new" Varig, is a brand new airline which comprises the brands Varig and Rio-Sul, Varig's route rights, all aircraft but one and the Smiles mileage program. "New" Varig was auctioned on 14 July 2006 to Volo do Brasil (owner of VarigLog) and legal procedures finalized on 20 July 2006.

Since 23 October 2007, the former Viação Aérea Rio-Grandense S/A was judicially known as Nordeste Linhas Aéreas S/A, and operated under the brand-name Flex Linhas Aéreas. On 18 August 2009, the National Civil Aviation Agency of Brazil renewed the authorization of Flex to operate non-regular passenger, cargo and postal services. Therefore, Flex operated flights on behalf of other airlines, as contracted.

Between 17 June 2005 and 2 September 2009, "old Varig" remained in Recovery Order in the 1st Business Court of Rio de Janeiro, under the leadership of Judges Luiz Roberto Ayoub and Miguel Dau. After the bankruptcy protection was lifted, the administration of the airline could have returned to its original owner, Fundação Ruben Berta, which still owned 87% of the shares of Varig. However, Fundação Ruben Berta preferred to keep a judicial administrator.

In September 2006 "old" Varig sold its participation in PLUNA (49% of the shares) to the Uruguayan government. In the same month Brazilian Playboy featured three Varig air hostesses (Juliana Neves, Sabrina Knop and Patricia Kreusburg) posing nude. As Varig was becoming defunct, the magazine's editors decided to follow the steps of the American edition, which featured nude female employees of another defunct company, Enron.

On 31 January 2007, Varig Brazilian Airlines ("old" Varig) was suspended from membership in Star Alliance for not fulfilling membership pre-requisites, and on 19 October 2008, the IATA code RG and the callsign Varig officially ceased to exist.

As a result of accumulated debts, on 20 August 2010, at the request of the airline administrator, the 1st Business Court of Rio de Janeiro declared Flex bankrupt and initiated the process of liquidation. However, on 10 September, the bankruptcy process was suspended at the request of Ruben Berta Foundation and the company returned in practical terms to recovery order status until the validity of the bankruptcy is judged.

==== Acquisition of Varig ====
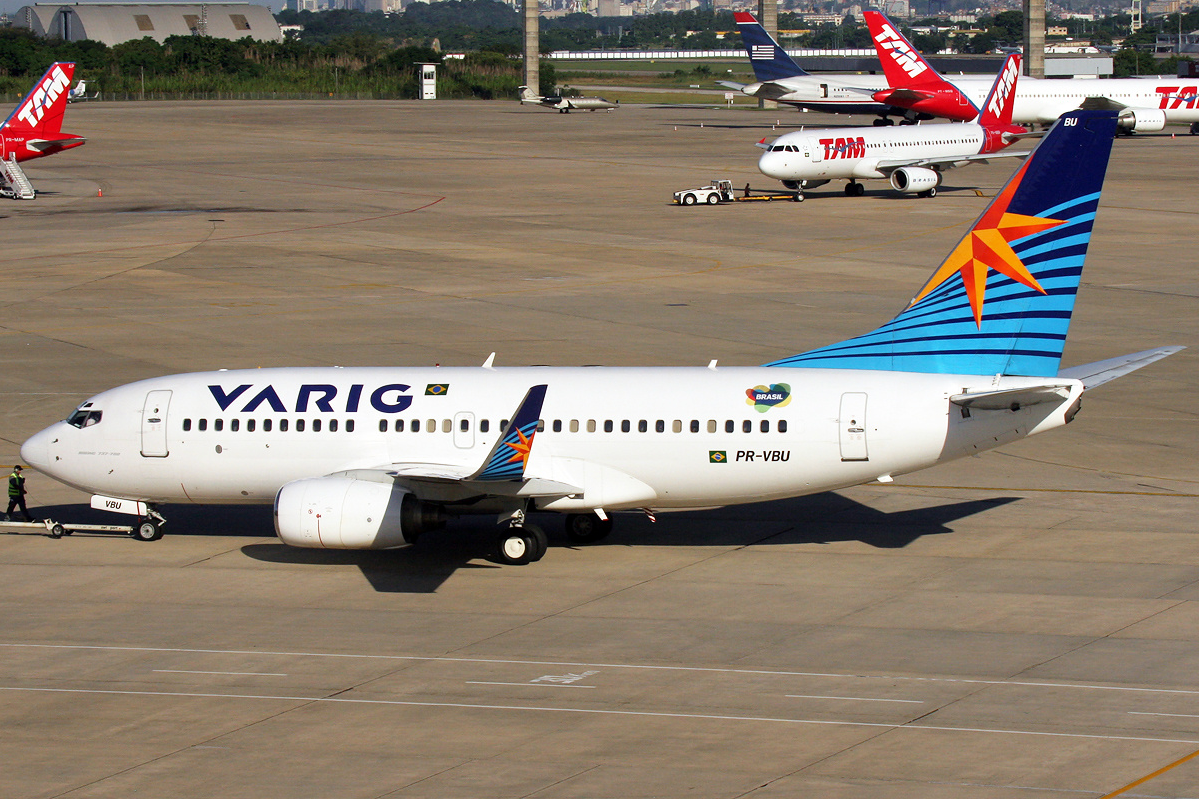
A Boeing 737-700 at Galeão Airport in 2010 livery during the purchase of VARIG by Gol Linhas Aéreas

VRG Linhas Aéreas S/A was fully integrated in Gol Linhas Aéreas.

On 21 July 2006, the "new" Varig canceled all its flights, except for Rio de Janeiro–São Paulo shuttle service, which remained in operation through an agreement with "old" Varig. On 28 July 2006, "new" Varig announced that it would cut 60% of its staff.

Between September and November 2006, "new" Varig announced its intentions to gradually resume some international and domestic flights. On 14 December 2006, the National Civil Aviation Agency of Brazil issued the final certificate to "new" Varig, making it fully operational. Soon after the certificate was granted, orders for 16 aircraft were announced, to bring the fleet to 31 aircraft and the operational agreement with "old" Varig expired.

On 28 March 2007, Gol Airlines purchased "new Varig" (VRG Linhas Aéreas) for US$320 million, and announced that VRG Linhas Aéreas, the operator of the brand VARIG, would continue to operate under its original name. The transaction was completed on 9 April 2007.

The new owner radically restructured the fleet, the network, eliminated the First Class cabin from the aircraft, and gradually transformed the brand Varig into the arm of Gol Group specialized in international scheduled and charter medium and long-haul destinations. On 23 October 2007, Varig's new corporate image was unveiled, stressing the orange colour of Gol.

On 29 September 2008, Gol was merged into VRG Linhas Aéreas and thus VRG Linhas Aéreas became an airline with two different brands: Varig and Gol. As a consequence, on mid-April 2009, Varig's booking systems were integrated into Gol's and the Smiles frequent flyer program was reformulated to include Gol. In June 2009, "new" Varig ceased to operate its own flights and started to use Gol's flight numbers.

From 2006 to 2009, "new" Varig was obliged by contract to purchase a minimum of 140 hours/month of services from "old" Varig. Therefore, some of VRG Linhas Aéreas flights operated with Gol flight numbers were actually flown with chartered aircraft from Flex Linhas Aéreas.

== Historical fleet ==
The fleet list below is based on the standard published Varig history.

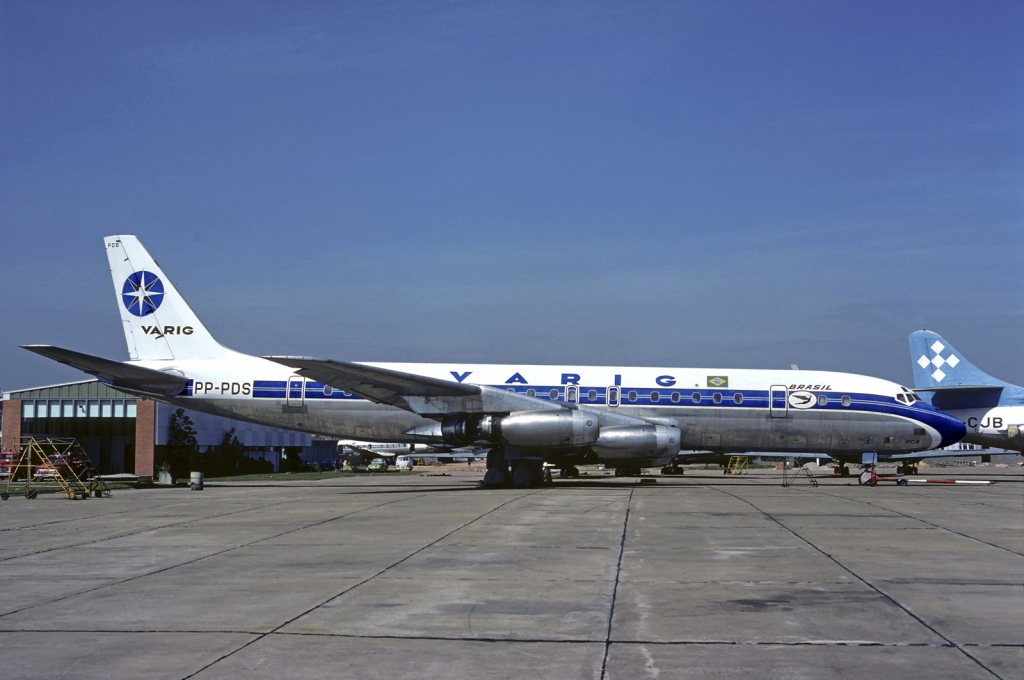
One of the Douglas DC 8-33 inherited from Panair do Brasil

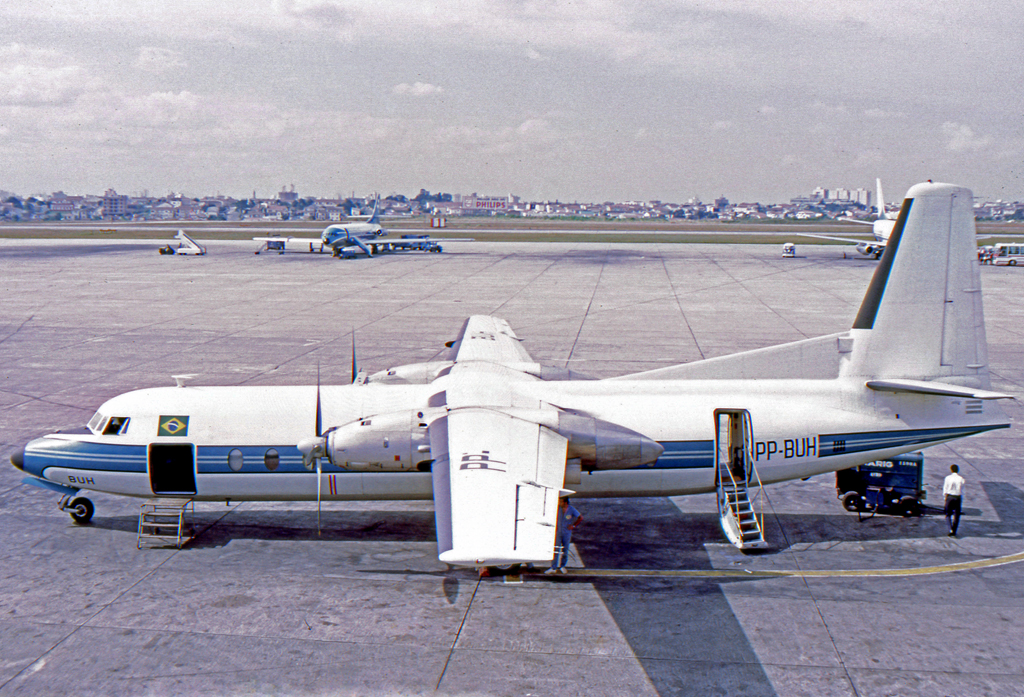
A Fairchild Hiller FH-227B at São Paulo Congonhas Airport in 1972

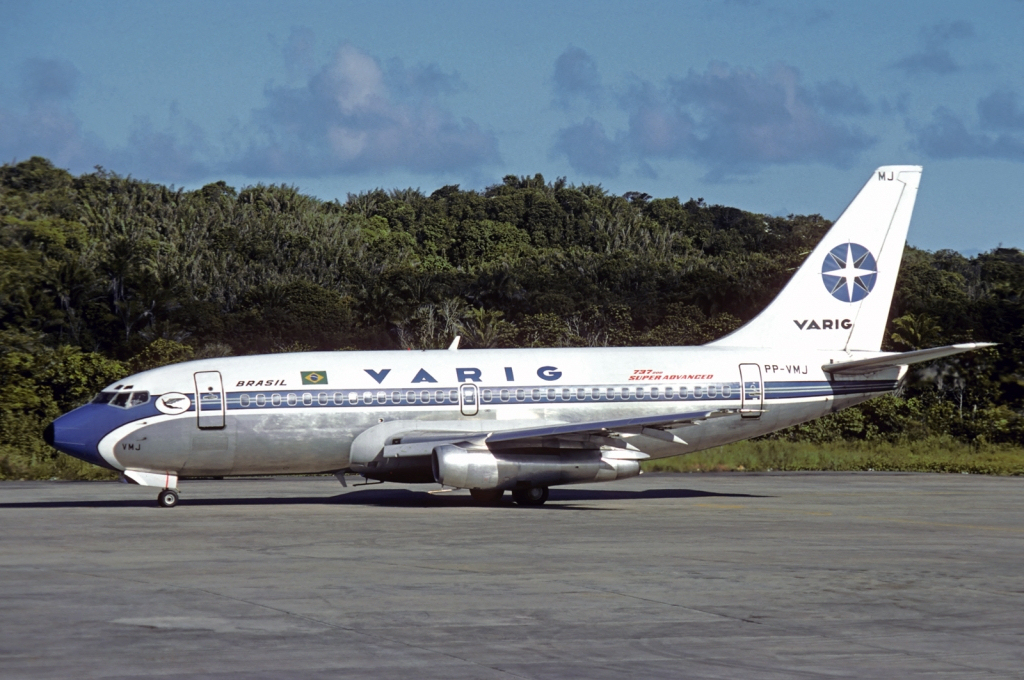
A Boeing 737-200 in 1977

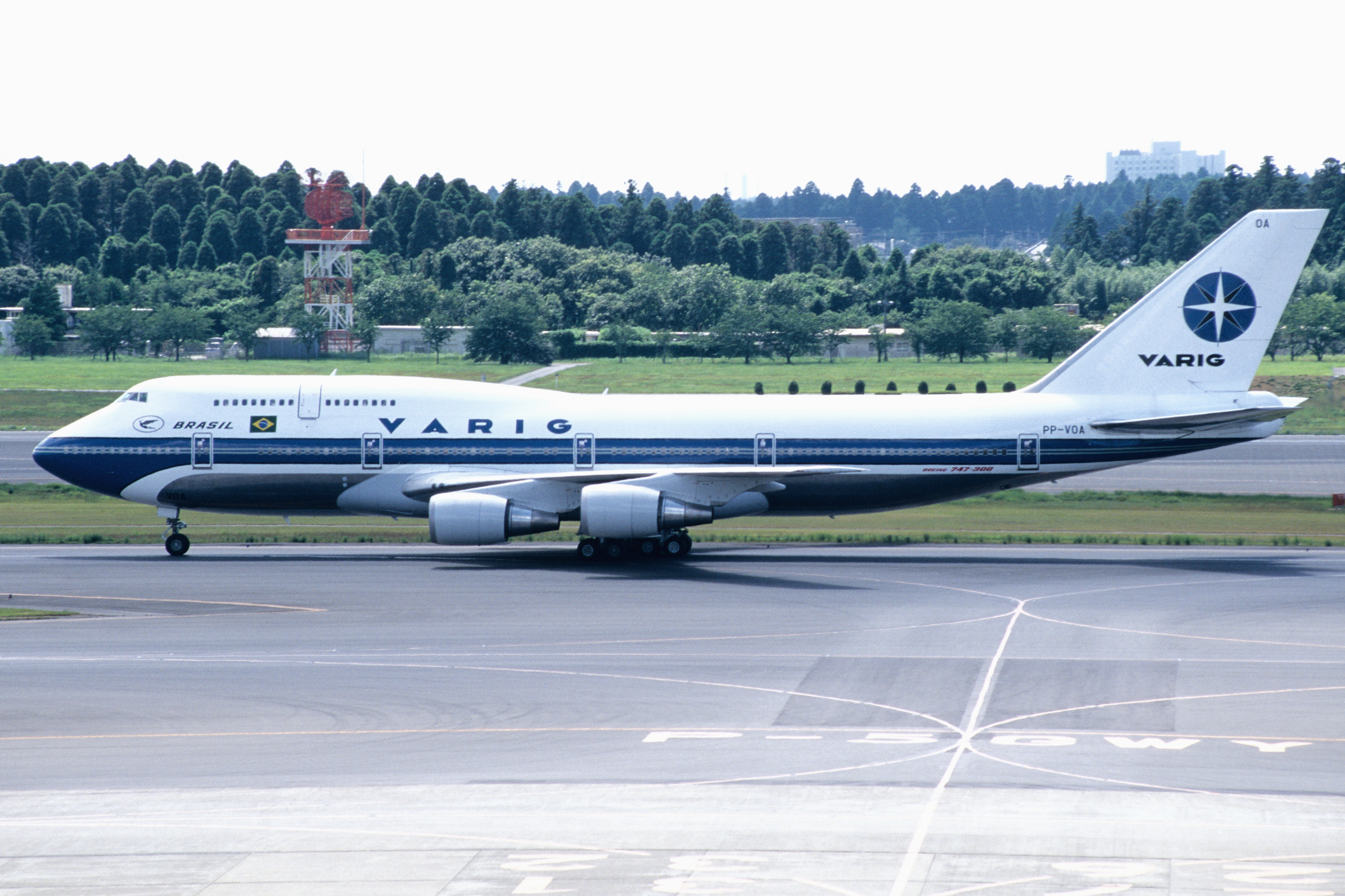
A Boeing 747-300

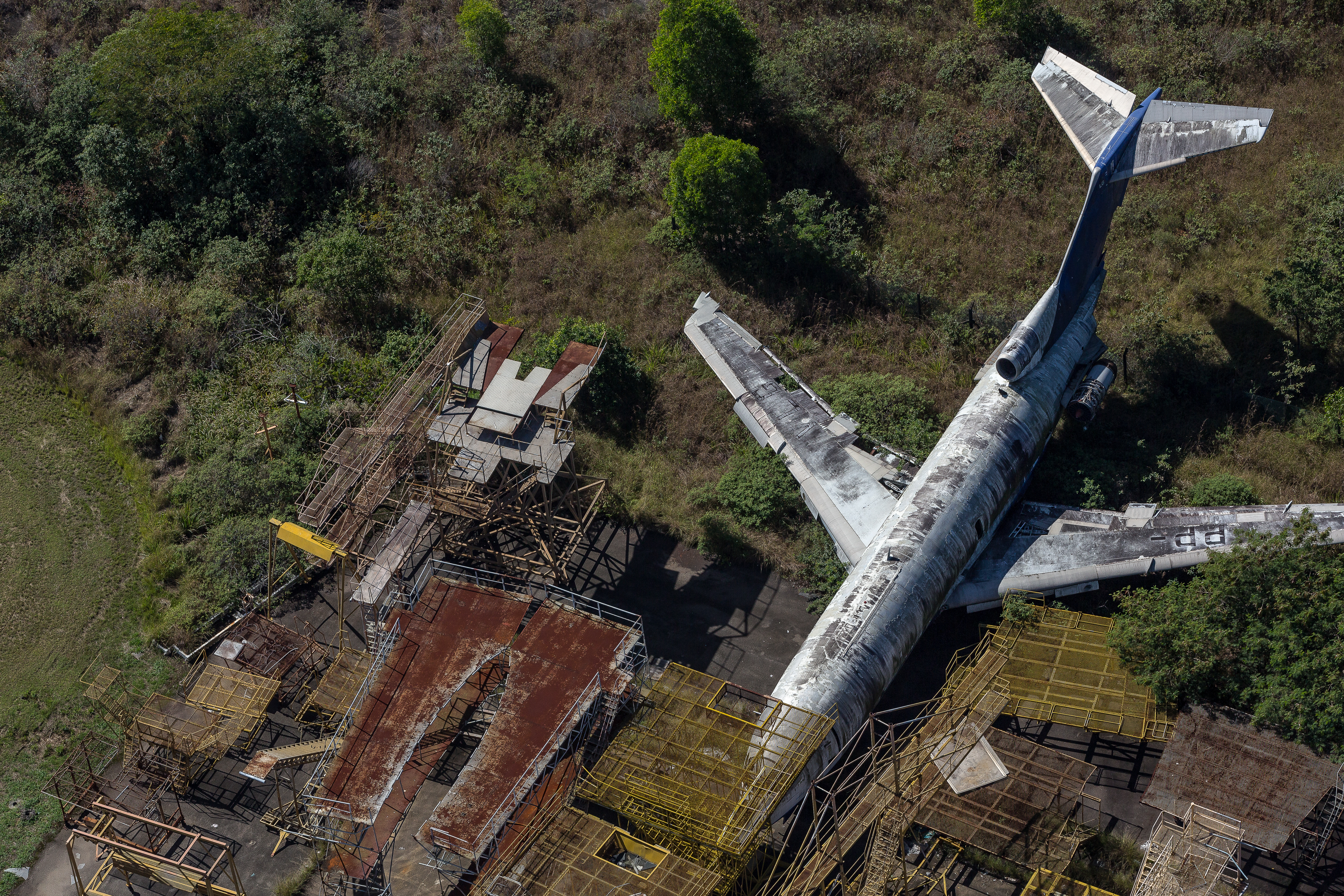
Boeing 727 PP-VLG abandoned at Rio de Janeiro Airport

Varig historical fleet
Aircraft	Total	Years of operation	Notes
Dornier Do J Wal	1	1927–1930	First aircraft registered in Brazil
Dornier Merkur	1	1928–1930	
Morane-Saulnier 130	1	1930–1931	
Klemm L-25	2	1930–1937	
Nieuport-Delage 641	1	1931	
Junkers A-50 Junior	3	1931–1944	
Junkers F.13	2	1932–1948	
Messerschmitt Bf-108 Taifun	1	1936	
Messersschmitt M-20B	1	1937–1948	
Junkers Ju 52/3m	1	1938–1942	
Focke-Wulf Fw 58C Weihe	1	1940–1941	
de Havilland DH 89 Dragon Rapide	1	1942	
CANT Z.1012	1	1942	
Fiat G.2	1	1942–1945	
Lockheed L-10 A/E Electra	11	1943–1955	
Douglas DC 3/C-47	47	1946–1971	
Noorduyn C-64 Norseman	1	1947–1950	
Curtiss C-46/Super C-46 Commando	29	1948–1970	
Convair 240	13	1954–1969	
Lockheed L-1049G/H Super Constellation	10	1955–1967	
Sud Aviation SE-210 Caravelle I (III)	3	1959–1979	
Boeing 707-441	3	1960–1979	
Convair 340/440	15	1961–1967	
Douglas DC 6B	5	1961–1968	
Lockheed L-188 A/C Electra	15	1962–1992	
Convair 990A	3	1963–1971	Inherited from Aerovias Brasil order
Douglas DC 8-33	2	1965–1975	Received from Panair do Brasil
(Avro) Hawker Siddeley HS 748	11	1966–1976	
Boeing 707-320/320C	17	1966–1990	
Beechcraft 99 Airliner	1	1968	
Fairchild Hiller FH-227B	4	1970–1975	Taken over from Paraense
Boeing 727-100	11	1970–2006	
Douglas DC 10-30	16	1974–2006	
Boeing 737-200	20	1975–2003	
Airbus A300-B4-203	4	1980–1990	
Boeing 747-200	4	1981–1996	
Boeing 747-300/300 Combi	5	1985–2000	
Boeing 767-200/200ER	9	1986–2004, 2008	Some operated for "new" Varig
Boeing 737-300	48	1987–2009	1 to Flex Linhas Aéreas; Some operated for "new" Varig
Boeing 767-300ER	16	1989–2008	Some operated for "new" Varig
Boeing 747-400	3	1991–1994	
McDonnell Douglas MD-11	26	1991–2007	Some operated for "new" Varig
Boeing 737-400	8	2000–2006	
Boeing 737-700	10	2001–2006	
Boeing 737-800	2	2001–2006	
Boeing 777-200ER	8	2001–2006	
Boeing 737-500	25	2003–2006	
Boeing 757-200	4	2004–2006	

== Frequent-flyer program ==
Smiles was Varig's frequent-flyer program until 20 July 2006. Points could be used for services from Varig, its subsidiaries, and its Star Alliance partners including flights, upgrades, holidays, hotel stays and car rentals. Smiles was part of the "new Varig" package bought by Gol Airlines. All miles were honored and eventually Smiles became Gol's own frequent-flyer program.

== Accidents and incidents ==
According to the Aviation Safety Network, in its over 75 year history, Varig has had a total of 39 accidents or incidents.

=== Major accidents involving fatalities ===
- 28 February 1942: a Junkers Ju 52/3m registration PP-VAL, crashed shortly after take-off from Porto Alegre. Seven of the 23 occupants died, including two crew members.
- 20 June 1944: a Lockheed 10 A/E Electra registration PP-VAQ on approach to Porto Alegre after a flight from Pelotas during a storm crashed on the waters of Guaíba river. All 10 passengers and crew died.
- 2 August 1949: a Curtiss C-46AD-10-CU Commando registration PP-VBI operating a flight from São Paulo–Congonhas to Porto Alegre made an emergency landing on rough terrain near the location of Jaquirana, approximately 20 minutes before landing in Porto Alegre, following a fire in the cargo hold. Of the 36 passengers and crew aboard, five died.
- 4 June 1954: a Curtiss C-46A-45-CU Commando registration PP-VBZ operating a cargo flight between São Paulo–Congonhas and Porto Alegre crashed during take-off from São Paulo. All three crew members died.
- 7 April 1957: a Curtiss C-46AD-10-CU Commando registration PP-VCF operating a flight from Bagé to Porto Alegre crashed during take-off in Bagé following a fire developed in the left main gear wheel well and consequent technical difficulties. All 40 passengers and crew died.
- 14 August 1957: Varig Flight 850, a Lockheed L-1049 registration PP-VDA operating a flight from Salgado Filho International Airport to John F. Kennedy International Airport, suffered a failure on engine 2 during the flight, but landed successfully in Las Américas International Airport at Dominican Republic. The passengers were reallocated to other flights, and the Constellation took off with only 11 crew. However, during the flight, engine 4 accelerated unevenly, and pieces of the prop flew off and hit engine 3, causing an explosion. The aircraft tried to land in the ocean. One flight attendant died by drowning during the crash landing; the other 10 survived.
- 18 October 1957: a Douglas C-47A-80-DL registration PP-VCS operating a cargo flight from Porto Alegre crashed upon take-off. The crew of two died.
- 12 April 1960: a Douglas C-53 registration PP-CDS operating a flight on behalf of Cruzeiro do Sul from Pelotas to Porto Alegre collided with two other aircraft, crashed and caught fire after it deviated to the right on take-off and an overcorrection caused a sharp turn to the left. Of the 22 passengers and crew aboard, 10 died.
- 27 November 1962: Varig Flight 810, a Boeing 707-441 registration PP-VJB operating flight 810 from Rio de Janeiro–Galeão to Lima, initiated an overshoot procedure at the suggestion of the control tower because it was too high. It proceeded to start another approach when it crashed into La Cruz peak, 8 miles away from Lima Airport. Possibly there was a misinterpretation of navigation instruments. All 97 passengers and crew aboard died.
- 22 December 1962: a Convair CV-240-2, registration PP-VCQ, flying from Rio de Janeiro to Brasília via Belo Horizonte-Pampulha, descended below the prescribed altitude while on final approach to Brasília, struck trees, skidded and fell to one side. One crew member died, out of 40 occupants of the aircraft.
- 1 July 1963: a Douglas C-47B-20-DK registration PP-VBV flying from Porto Alegre to Carazinho, Passo Fundo and Erechim, collided with trees on high ground and crashed shortly before arriving in Passo Fundo. Of the 18 passengers and crew aboard, 15 died.
- 5 March 1967: a Douglas DC-8-33 registration PP-PEA operating flight 837 from Beirut and Rome-Fiumicino to Recife and Rio de Janeiro–Galeão via Monrovia caught fire after a mistaken approach to Monrovia, missing the threshold of the runway by 6,023 ft. Of the 90 passengers and crew aboard 51 died as well as five on the ground.
- 9 June 1973: a cargo Boeing 707-327C registration PP-VLJ flying from Viracopos-Campinas International Airport to Rio de Janeiro–Galeão while making an instrument approach to Rio de Janeiro–Galeão had technical problems with the spoilers which eventually caused the aircraft to pitch down. It descended fast, and struck approach lights and a ditch. Two of the four occupants died.
- 11 July 1973: a Boeing 707-345C registration PP-VJZ operating flight 820 from Rio de Janeiro–Galeão to Paris-Orly made a successful emergency landing at an open field 5 km before landing, after reporting fire in a rear lavatory. However, 123 of the 134 passengers and crew aboard died, overcome by smoke and carbon monoxide poisoning before the aircraft could be evacuated. The most likely cause was a lit cigarette thrown into the aircraft's lavatory trash. Subsequently, in-flight smoking was banned.
- 30 January 1979: a cargo Boeing 707-323C registration PP-VLU operating flight 967 en route from Tokyo-Narita to Rio de Janeiro–Galeão via Los Angeles went missing over the Pacific Ocean some 30 minutes (200 km ENE) from Tokyo. Causes are unknown since the wreck was never found. Among other cargo, the aircraft was carrying either 53 or 153 paintings by the Japanese Brazilian artist Manabu Mabe, worth US$1.24 million. The aircraft was flown by Gilberto Araújo da Silva, who was also the captain and survivor of the accident with Flight 820 six years earlier. The crew of six died and their bodies were never recovered.
- 3 January 1987: a Boeing 707-379C registration PP-VJK operating flight 797 from Abidjan to Rio de Janeiro–Galeão crashed due to a failure on engine 1 shortly after take-off. While attempting to return to the airport for an emergency landing, it crashed on a field 18 km away from Abidjan's airport. Of the 51 passengers and crew aboard, a single passenger survived.
- 3 September 1989: a Boeing 737-241 registration PP-VMK operating flight 254 flying from São Paulo–Guarulhos to Belém-Val de Cans via Uberaba, Uberlândia, Goiânia, Brasília, Imperatriz and Marabá crashed near São José do Xingu while on its last leg of the flight due to a pilot navigational error, which led to fuel exhaustion and a subsequent belly landing into the jungle, 450 miles (724 km) southwest of Marabá. Out of 54 occupants, there were 13 fatalities, all of them passengers. The survivors were discovered two days later.
- 14 February 1997: a Boeing 737-241 registration PP-CJO operating flight 265, flying from Marabá to Carajás while on touch-down procedures at Carajás during a thunderstorm, had its right main gear collapsed rearwards, causing the aircraft to veer off the right of the runway. The aircraft crashed into the forest. One crew member died.

=== Incidents ===
- 30 May 1972: a Lockheed L-188 Electra registration PP-VJL operating a flight between São Paulo–Congonhas to Porto Alegre was hijacked. The hijacker demanded money. The aircraft was stormed and the hijacker was shot.

== See also ==
- List of defunct airlines of Brazil
- List of airlines of Brazil
- Transport in Brazil
- Paulo de Mello Bastos

== Bibliography ==
- Lloyd, Barry (2022). Varig: Star of Brazil. Airlines Series, Vol. 6. Stamford, England: Key Publishing. ISBN 9781802822502.
