= Varig Logística =

Brazilian cargo airline

Varig Log
IATA	ICAO	Call sign
LC	VLO	VELOG
- Founded: 25 August 2000
- Commenced operations: September 2000
- Ceased operations: 27 September 2012
- Hubs: São Paulo/Guarulhos International Airport
- Fleet size: 4
- Destinations: 8
- Parent company: Varig (2000-2005); Volo do Brasil (2005-2012)
- Headquarters: São Paulo, Brazil
- Key people: Chan Lup Wai Ohira
- Website: www.variglog.com

Varig Logística S.A., operating as VarigLog, was a cargo airline, based in Jardim Aeroporto, Campo Belo, São Paulo, Brazil.

All operations were suspended on 1 February 2012 and on 27 September 2012 it was declared bankrupt.

== History ==
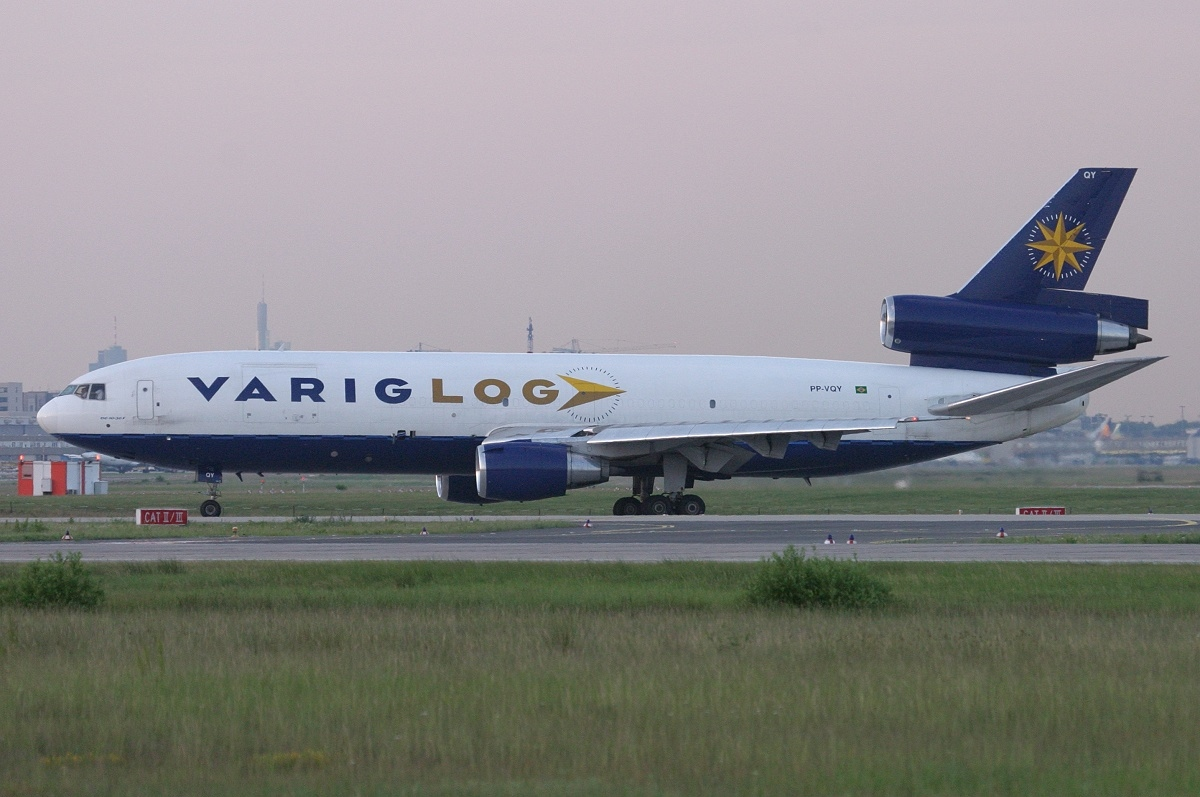
A McDonnell Douglas DC-10-30F of VarigLog at Frankfurt Airport in 2003

On 25 August 2000, Varig Logística was founded as a separate company from the main airline Varig. The airline started operations in September 2000. The new venture took over all cargo operations, a staff of 1,345 employees and a fleet of 11 cargo aircraft, 4 Boeing 727-100F, 4 Boeing 727-200F and 3 McDonnell Douglas DC-10-30F; At that time, Varig Logística was the largest cargo airline in the country, with distribution centers in São Paulo, Rio de Janeiro, Manaus, Porto Alegre, Miami, New York City and Frankfurt.

Varig Log was purchased for US$48.2 million by the consortium Volo do Brasil in December 2005 during the split-up of the assets of Varig. Volo do Brasil comprised the MatlinPatterson Funds and the Brazilian investors Marcos Antonio Audi, Marcos Hapfel, and Luiz Eduardo Gallo. The negotiation was concluded in June 2006, after strict regulatory approval, particularly concerned with the participation of foreign capital, limited by Brazilian laws to 20%.

In July 2006, Volo bought its one-time parent Varig (the "new" Varig, founded in 2005) but less than one year later Varig was divested from the Volo group, when on 28 March 2007 Gol Linhas Aéreas Inteligentes, the parent company of budget carrier Gol Transportes Aéreos, purchased Varig for US$320 million.

In March 2008, there were reports of asset transfers between Varig Log and Arrow Air, as Arrow was also being absorbed into the MatlinPatterson holding company but they were not implemented.

Since March 2008, Varig Log has accumulated debts with both large and small suppliers which led to the request to be placed under bankruptcy protection on 3 March 2009. The Brazilian former investors accuse MatlinPatterson of mismanagement to lead Varig Log to bankruptcy. While VarigLog is protected, the legal battle continues.

The company is in "debtor-in-possession financing / receivership" at this time, and is under the direction of the successor organization to Volo, the Synergy Group. Published reports of October 2009 were that the Brazilian Synergy Group had acquired a controlling majority shareholding of Varig Logistica.

Between June 2007 and June 2009, Varig Log maintained an operational agreement with FedEx in Brazil.

Germán Efromovich (owner of Synergy Group) gave up on buying the airline in 2011. On 3 February 2012, due to economic problems, it was forced to cease operations. On 27 September 2012, VarigLog was declared bankrupt and abolished.

== Destinations ==
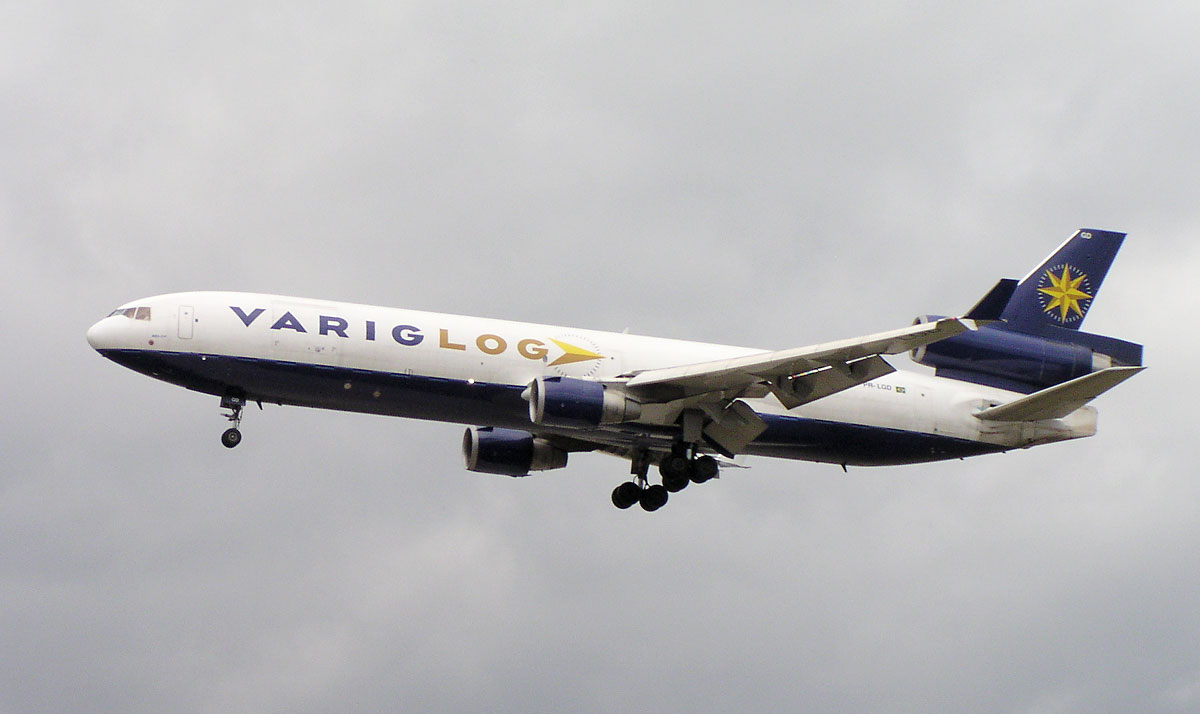
A McDonnell Douglas MD-11F of VarigLog on approach to Frankfurt Airport in 2006

As of March 2011, VarigLog operated services to the following scheduled destinations:

- Belém – Val de Cães International Airport
- Brasília – Pres. Juscelino Kubitschek International Airport
- Campinas – Viracopos International Airport
- Fortaleza – Pinto Martins International Airport
- Manaus – Eduardo Gomes International Airport
- Recife – Guararapes/Gilberto Freyre International Airport
- Salvador da Bahia – Deputado Luís Eduardo Magalhães International Airport
- São Paulo – Guarulhos/Gov. André Franco Montoro International Airport

== Fleet ==
=== Former fleet ===
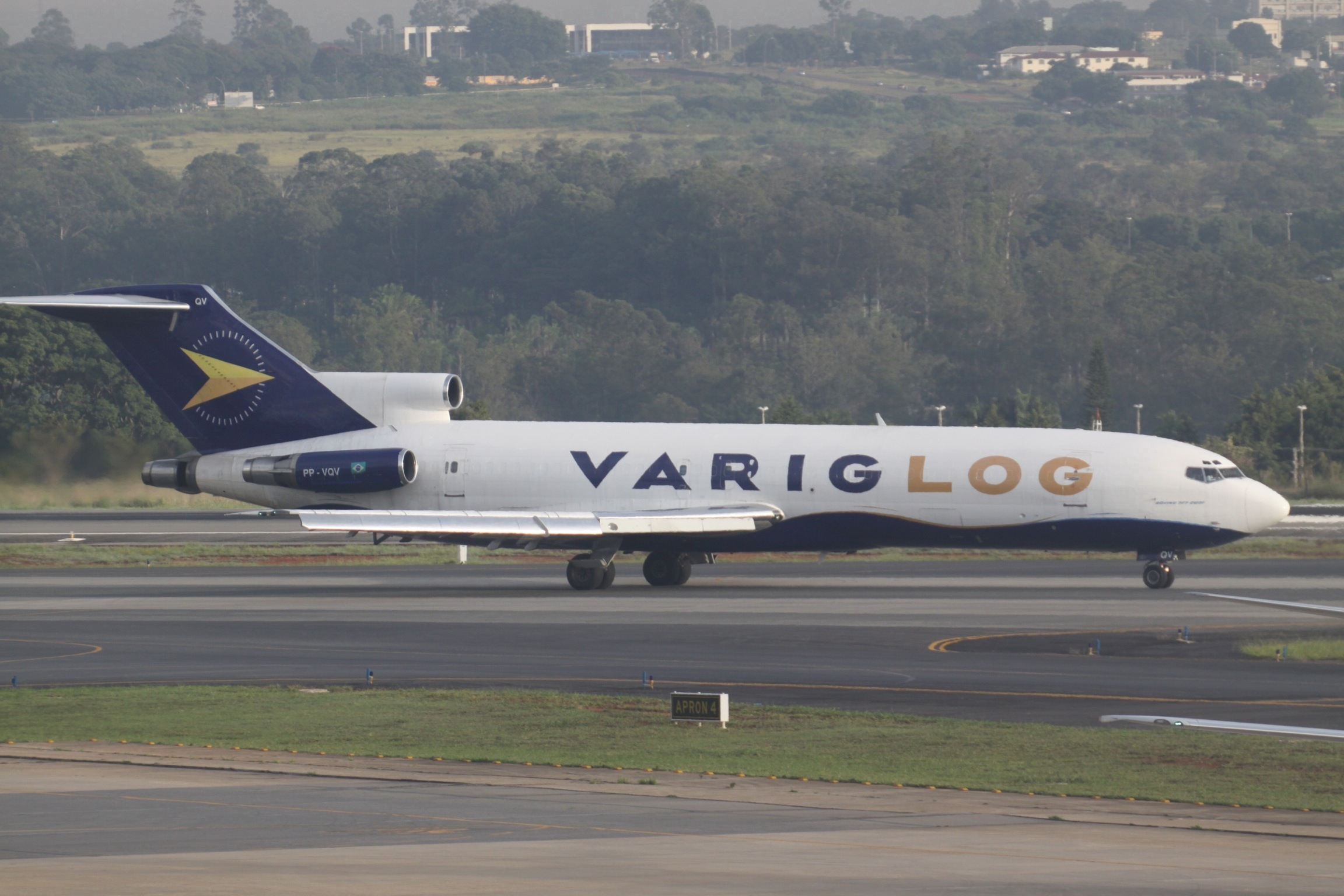
A VarigLog Boeing 727-200F at Brasília International Airport in 2008

As of December 2011 the fleet of VarigLog included the following aircraft:

VarigLog fleet
Aircraft	Total	Orders	Notes
Boeing 727-200F	1	—	
Boeing 737-400SF	2	—	
Boeing 757-200PCF	1	—	
Total	4	—	

=== Retired fleet ===
VarigLog had in the past operated a variety of aircraft, including:

- Boeing 727-100C
- Boeing 757-200SF
- Cessna 208B Grand Caravan
- McDonnell Douglas DC-10-30F
- McDonnell Douglas MD-11F

== Accidents and incidents ==
- On 18 March 2002, a Boeing 727-100C (registered PP-VLV), was flying from Salvador to Belo Horizonte when it rolled off the runway during landing and was critically damaged. The crew of 3 were not injured.

== See also ==
- List of defunct airlines of Brazil
