= Dugomes Air Táxi Aéreo =

Brazilian Air Taxi Airline

IATA	ICAO	Call sign
—	—	—
- Founded: December 4, 2007; 18 years ago
- AOC #: 7,749 - April 6, 2022
- Hubs: Eduardo Gomes International Airport
- Secondary hubs: Cruzeiro do Sul International Airport; Plácido de Castro International Airport
- Fleet size: 6 (as of May 2024)
- Destinations: 10 (as of May 2024)
- Headquarters: Manaus, Brazil
- Key people: Gleberson Pinheiro Gomes (CEO)

Dugomes Air Táxi Aéreo or simply Dugomes Air, formerly known as Rio Acre Aerotáxi, is a Brazilian air taxi and non-scheduled airline, headquartered in Manaus, Amazonas.

The company is certified by the National Civil Aviation Agency (ANAC) under the Brazilian Civil Aviation Regulations (RBAC) No. 135, being authorized to transport passengers with aircraft with a maximum capacity of up to 19 seats.

== History ==
=== Rio Acre Aerotáxi (2007–2022) ===
==== Establishment ====
Rio Acre Aerotáxi was founded on December 4, 2007, with its headquarters at Plácido de Castro International Airport in Rio Branco, Acre. The company's name is a tribute to the Acre River, a watercourse that born in Peru and runs through Brazil, which was also the main stage of a landmark episode in Brazilian history, the Acre War, known in Brazil as Acrean Revolution (Portuguese: Revolução Acreana) and in Spanish as Guerra del Acre (War of the Acre), a border conflict between Bolivia and Brazil over the Acre Region.

==== Acquisition by the Gomes family ====
In 2012, with the need to transport his coffee production from Envira, in Amazonas, to cities such as Eirunepé and Itamarati, as well as Feijó, Jordão and Tarauacá, in Acre, businessman Wanderley da Silva Gomes, owner of the Indústria Gomes Comércio e Produtos Alimentícios company, beyond the brand Café Dugomes, decided to buy Rio Acre Aerotáxi, which became managed by his sons, Gleberson and Dennery Pinheiro Gomes, both commercial pilots. At this time, the company's fleet consisted of two aircraft, an Embraer EMB 720 Minuano registration PT-OFA (MSN 720136) and one Embraer EMB 810 Seneca II registration PT-OBL (MSN 810021).

In parallel to the air taxi, the family owns the travel agency Dugomes Agência de Viagens, in Cruzeiro do Sul, Acre, which offers passenger non-scheduled and charter flights on routes operated by Rio Acre Aerotáxi, generally the same ones used to transport Café Dugomes' production. As of 2020, the air taxi began to operate under the trade name of Dugomes Táxi Aéreo, although its corporate name continued as Rio Acre Aerotáxi.

=== Dugomes Air (2022–present) ===
==== Rebranding ====
On May 23, 2022, through its page on the social network Facebook, Rio Acre Táxi Aéreo announced that it would be renamed Dugomes Air. The change was also included in the Brazilian National Registry of Legal Entities (CNPJ), with the change to the company's corporate name to Dugomes Air Táxi Aéreo. The same change also appeared on the air operator certificate (CHETA, in Portuguese) of the National Civil Aviation Agency (ANAC), indicating Dugomes Air Táxi Aéreo as "formerly Rio Acre Aerotáxi".

In late 2023, Dugomes Air reestablished Plácido de Castro International Airport in Rio Branco, Acre, as a secondary hub.

== Controversies ==
=== Accusations of clandestine passenger flights ===
On September 6, 2021, the Acrean portal ac24horas published an article on its website, accusing Dugomes Air Táxi Aéreo of carrying out clandestine passenger flights to the cities of Porto Walter and Marechal Thaumaturgo, in Acre, according to the publication, banned since the end of 2020 by the National Civil Aviation Agency (ANAC) due to the lack of infrastructure and security at both airports. According to the Acre Highway Department (DEACRE), Dugomes Air could only operate at the two aerodromes after the state body itself authorized the flights, subject to the re-approval by ANAC of the two runways that had recently been renovated.

The day after publication, Dugomes Air Táxi Aéreo went public to clarify that the company never operated clandestinely in both cities, explaining that the flights were carried out in accordance with Resolution No. 623, of June 7, 2021, of the ANAC, which authorizes operation on non-approved runways, as long as the company complies with certain requirements established by the resolution. Dugomes Air also highlighted that it does not need authorization from DEACRE to operate at aerodromes, as the agency has neither legitimacy nor competence for this type of assignment, which belongs exclusively to ANAC.

== Destinations ==
Although not certified as a scheduled airline, as an air taxi certified under RBAC No. 135, Dugomes Air is authorized to sell tickets for up to 15 non-scheduled flights per week, in addition to offering charter flights, on aircraft with a maximum capacity of up to 19 seats. This is possible thanks to the relaxation of the rules of the Brazilian airline sector through Resolution No. 700, of January 24, 2023, of the National Civil Aviation Agency (ANAC), with the aim of promoting the development of regional aviation in Brazil.

As of May 2024, Dugomes Air offers weekly flights on a non-scheduled basis to the following destinations:

Base
Future
Terminated

Dugomes Air Táxi Aéreo destinations
State	City	Airport	Notes
Acre
Acre	Cruzeiro do Sul	Cruzeiro do Sul International Airport	Non-scheduled
Acre	Feijó	Feijó Airport	Non-scheduled
Acre	Rio Branco	Plácido de Castro International Airport	Non-scheduled
Amazonas	Barcelos	Barcelos Airport	Non-scheduled
Amazonas	Carauari	Carauari Airport	Non-scheduled
Amazonas	Eirunepé	Amaury Feitosa Tomaz Airport	Non-scheduled
Amazonas	Envira	Piloto João Fonseca Municipal Airport	Non-scheduled
Amazonas	Ipixuna	Ipixuna Municipal Airport	Non-scheduled
Amazonas	Itamarati	Itamarati Airport	Non-scheduled
Amazonas	Manaus	Eduardo Gomes International Airport	HUB

== Fleet ==
Dugomes Air Táxi Aéreo fleet
Aircraft	In Service	Orders	Passengers	Note
Embraer EMB 720 Minuano	3	—	6	Brazilian license-built version of PA-32
Embraer EMB 810 Seneca	1	—	6	PT-RDF lsd VNA Táxi Aéreo
Embraer EMB 110 Bandeirante	2	—	12	Semi-Private configuration
Embraer EMB 110 Bandeirante	2	—	18	EMB 110P2 variant
TOTAL	6	—		

== See also ==
- List of airlines of Brazil
