= Braspress Air Cargo =

Brazilian cargo airline

Brasspress Air Cargo
IATA	ICAO	Call sign
BP	BPC	BRASPRESS
- Founded: December 23, 2022; 3 years ago
- AOC #: 16,844 - April 22, 2025
- Hubs: Viracopos International Airport
- Fleet size: 4 (as of July 2024)
- Parent company: Braspress Transportes Urgentes
- Headquarters: Guarulhos, Brazil
- Key people: Tarcísio Gargioni (CEO) Charles Malak (COO)(3)
- Founders: Urubatan Helou; Milton Domingues Petri
- Website: www.braspress.com

Braspress Air Cargo Transportes Aéreos or simply Braspress Air Cargo is a Brazilian cargo airline headquartered in Guarulhos, Greater São Paulo. Founded in 2022, it is the air cargo transportation arm of Braspress Transportes Urgentes, one of the largest road transport companies in Brazil and Latin America.

== History ==
=== Establishment ===
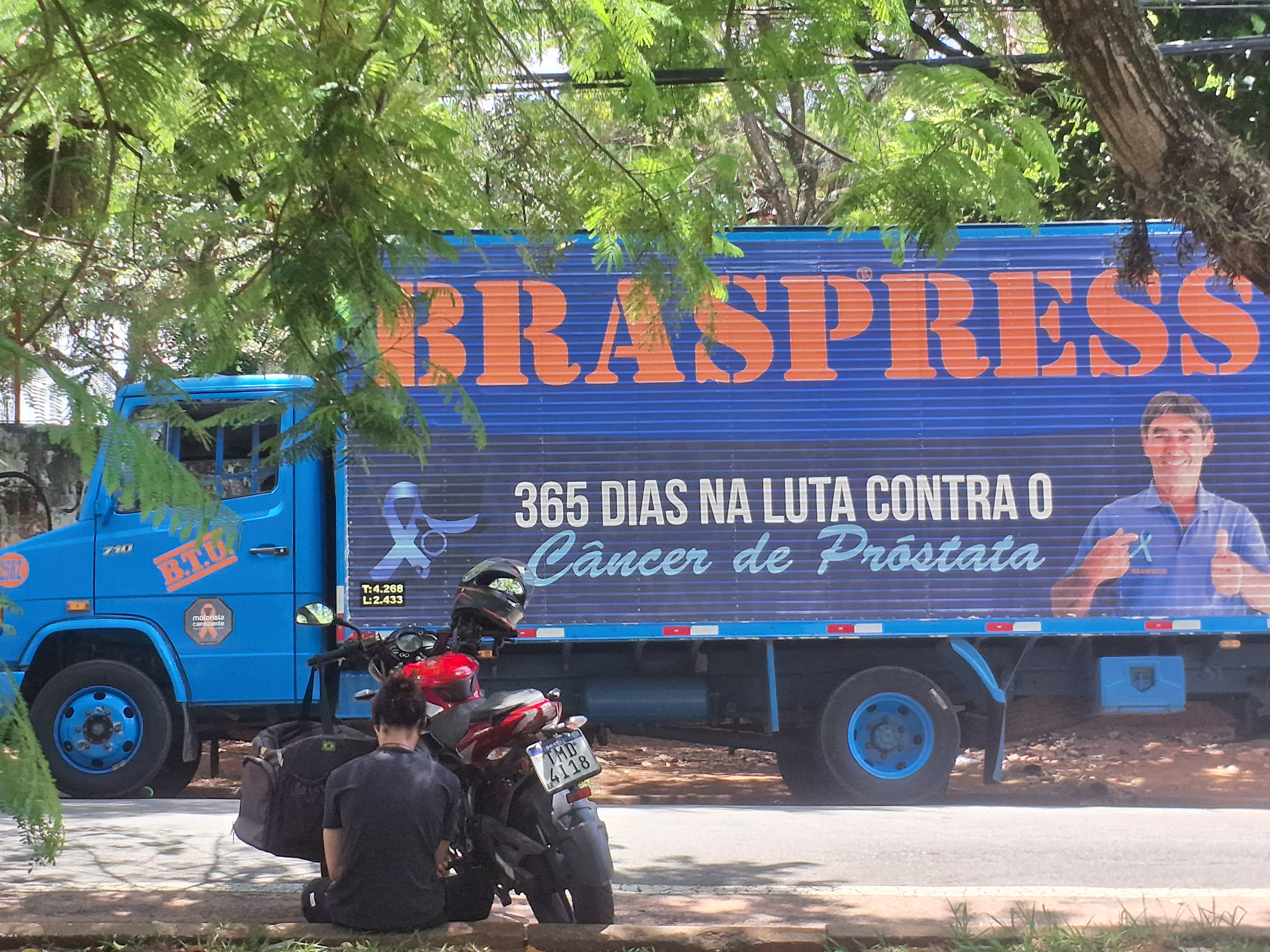
Braspress truck promoting awareness of the fight against prostate cancer in Barão Geraldo, Campinas, São Paulo, Brazil

The process of creating Braspress Air Cargo began on December 23, 2022, with the issuance of National Registry of Legal Entities (CNPJ) with the Special Department of Federal Revenue of Brazil, popularly known as Receita Federal (RFB). At the same time, the new airline began its approval process with the National Civil Aviation Agency of Brazil (ANAC) to obtain its air operator certificate (AOC).

The new airline was founded by Urubatan Helou, CEO of Braspress Transportes Urgentes and his partner, Milton Domingues Petri. Together, on July 1, 1977, they created Braspress, today one of the largest road transport companies in Latin America, with a presence in Brazil, Bolivia, Uruguay, Paraguay and Argentina, which has its own fleet of 3,090 trucks, 117 distribution centers, 9 thousand direct employees and 4 thousand outsourced workers.

In September 2023, it reserved aeronautical registrations through the Brazilian Aeronautical Registry (RAB) system for its first three aircraft, all of them of the Boeing 737-400BDSF. In January 2024, the first plane, registration PS-BPA (MSN 29206), was registered in a painting hangar in Woensdrecht, in the Netherlands, already wearing the traditional blue and orange colors of the Brazilian carrier, similar to the paint used on the vehicle fleet.

On March 3, 2024, the second Braspress Air Cargo plane, registration PS-BPB (MSN 29207), was officially delivered by the lessor World Star Aviation (WSA) and subsequently ferried between Liège, in Belgium, and São José dos Campos, in Brazil, to be prepared for its new operator at DIGEX MRO, where it will receive the airline's colors. The same plane will be used on certification flights, the last pending step before obtaining the air operator certificate.

On April 3, 2024, Braspress and Concessionária Aeroportos Brasil Viracopos, administrator of Viracopos International Airport, in Campinas, signed an area transfer agreement that allows the airline to begin installing the necessary infrastructure to begin its operations in the airport in the coming months. Braspress Air Cargo is expected to make its first flight in August, connecting Campinas/Viracopos with Eduardo Gomes International Airport, in Manaus.

On April 22, 2025, Braspress was granted its Air operator's certificate.

== Fleet ==
As of August 2025, the Braspress Air Cargo fleet consists of the following aircraft:

Aircraft	In service	Orders	Passengers	Notes
Boeing 737-400BDSF	2	—	Cargo	—
Embraer Phenom 100	1	—	5	VIP
Hawker Beechcraft 4000	1	—	10	VIP
Total	4	—		

== See also ==
- List of airlines of Brazil
