= FEJ =

FEJ could refer to:

- Feijó Airport, airport serving Feijó, Acre, Brazil

- Alcimar Leitão Airport, former airport serving Feijó, replaced by Feijó Airport

- European Youth Foundation, abbreviated in French as FEJ
