= Aerosul Linhas Aéreas =

Brazilian airline

IATA	ICAO	Call sign
2S	ASO	—
- Founded: 2020
- Commenced operations: 2021
- AOC #: 7,845 - April 20, 2022
- Fleet size: 3
- Headquarters: Arapongas, Brazil
- Website: voeaerosul.com

Aerosul Linhas Aéreas is a Brazilian airline based in Arapongas.

== History ==
On February 10, 2021, ANAC issued the concession grant for operating regular and non-regular public air transport services in Brazil. The airline had its maiden flight on June 16, 2021.

== Destinations ==
Below were the destinations of Aerosul. The airline is not operating regular flights anymore.

City	Airport	Begin	End	Refs
Apucarana	Capitão João Busse Airport	29 September 2021	Terminated	
Arapongas	Alberto Bertelli Airport		Terminated	
Caçador	Carlos Alberto da Costa Neves Airport	27 September 2021	Terminated	
Correia Pinto	Planalto Serrano Regional Airport	30 September 2021	Terminated	
Curitiba	Afonso Pena International Airport	16 June 2021	Terminated	
Florianópolis	Hercílio Luz International Airport	16 June 2021	Terminated	
Londrina	Gov. José Richa Airport	16 June 2021	Terminated	
Pato Branco	Juvenal Loureiro Cardoso Airport	28 September 2021	Terminated	
São Miguel do Oeste	Hélio Wasum Airport	27 September 2021	Terminated	

== Fleet ==
Aerosul fleet consists of the following aircraft (as of March 2022):

Aerosul fleet
Aircraft	In service	Orders	Passengers	Notes
Cessna 208 Caravan	3		9	
Total	3			

== See also ==
- List of airlines of Brazil
