= OMNI Táxi Aéreo =

Brazilian airline

IATA	ICAO	Call sign
O1	OMI	OMNI AIR
- Founded: December 2000; 25 years ago
- Commenced operations: September 2001; 24 years ago
- AOC #: 9,544 - October 18, 2022
- Hubs: Jacarepaguá Airport; Macaé Airport; Aracaju Airport; Eugene F. Correia International Airport
- Subsidiaries: OMNI Helicopters Guyana
- Fleet size: 70 (as of April 2024)
- Parent company: Omni Aviation
- Headquarters: Rio de Janeiro, Brazil
- Key people: Roberto Márcio Coimbra (CEO)
- Website: www.omnibrasil.com.br

OMNI Táxi Aéreo S.A, known as OMNI, is an air taxi and non-scheduled airline headquartered in Jacarepaguá, Rio de Janeiro. It operates offshore, onshore, aeromedical and non-scheduled passenger transport in helicopters and fixed-wing aircraft in Brazil and supports Omni Helicopters International´s (OHI) operations in Guyana through the groups affiliate Omni Helicopters Guyana Inc.

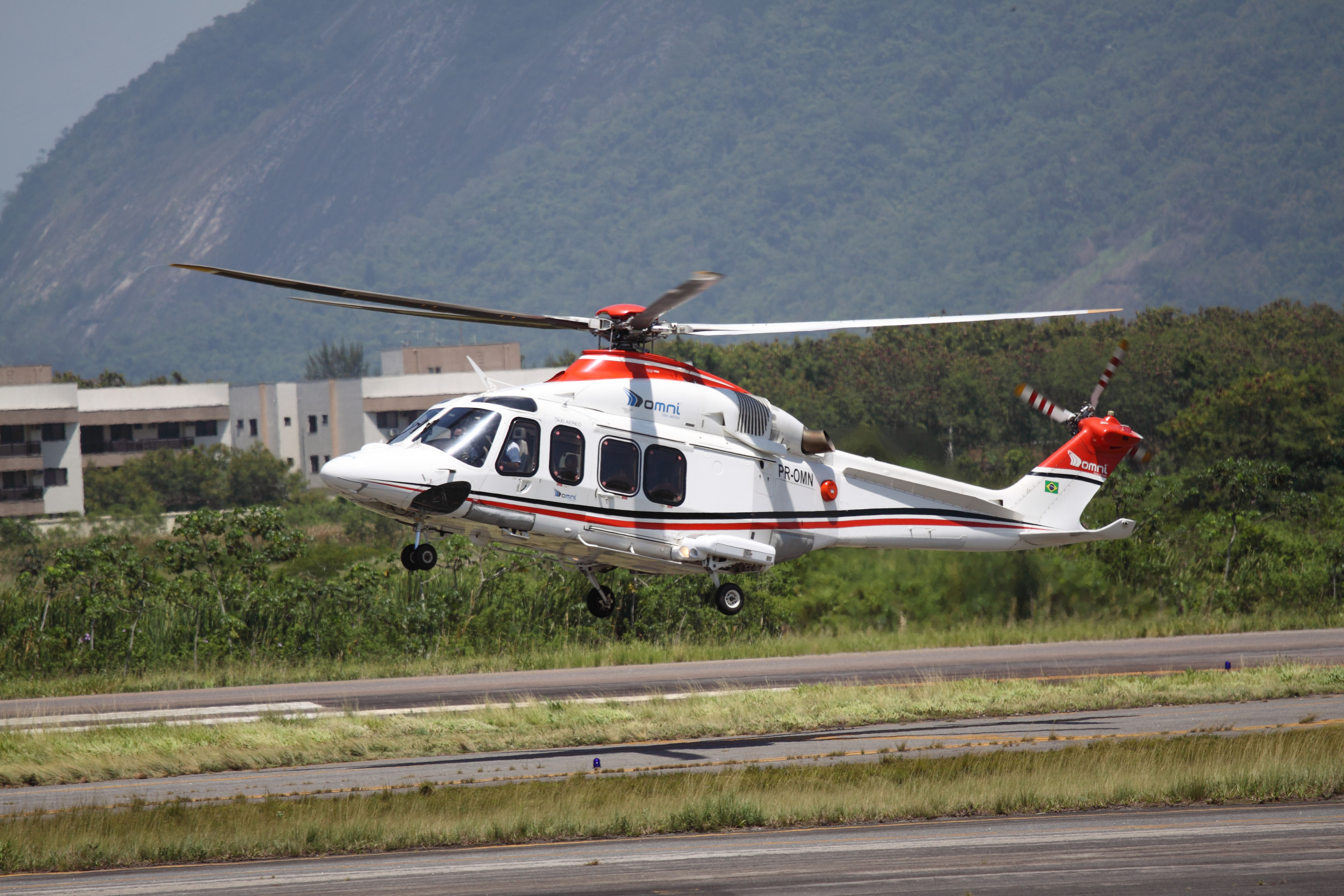
Leonardo AW139 reg. PR-OMN taking off from Jacarepaguá Airport

== History ==
=== Establishment ===
==== 2000s ====
Part of the Omni Helicopters International (OHI) group, based in Portugal and involved in fleet management and investments in helicopters for logistical support operations for the oil and gas sector and aeromedical transport, OMNI Táxi Aéreo was founded in December 2000. It had its operational approval in September 2001, after receiving the air operator certificate (CHETA, in Portuguese) from DAC (the extinct Department of Civil Aviation, replaced in 2005 by ANAC), starting operations with a Bell 212 registration PP-MEF, brought from Portugal to its base of operations located at Jacarepaguá Airport.

=== First years (2001-2010) ===
With the opening of the first operational headquarters in 2003, the company began to take shape, incorporating two Sikorsky S-76 helicopters into the fleet, in addition to the Bell 212. In 2005, it obtained its first contract with Petrobras for the operation of two Eurocopter EC135 helicopters in offshore operations in the northeast region of the country.

In September 2006, OMNI opened its hangar in Macaé Airport and at the end of the following year, it opened a new hangar in Jacarepaguá, which was able to house a large part of the company's administrative and corporate sectors. Over the years that followed, gradually added helicopters to its portfolio, particularly in the North and Northeast regions, where it began to exert a dominant presence not only in the offshore segment, but also in the onshore segment, in the heart of the Amazon rainforest.

In the following years, the company gradually increased its market share, gaining new operating bases towards the Northeast Region, with operations in Aracaju, Sergipe, and Salvador, Bahia, in addition to a significant increase in its activities from its bases in Rio de Janeiro and Macaé.

=== Contracts with Petrobras and expansion (2010-present) ===
==== 2010s ====
In 2010, OMNI ordered nine AgustaWestland AW139. The company also won air ambulance contracts, holding all of these contracts with Petrobras and consolidated a workforce of over 650 employees.

In 2011, OMNI received financial support from a London-based private equity firm Stirling Square Capital Partners, investing in the operation of large aircraft offshore in Brazil, incorporating Eurocopter EC225 Super Puma and Sikorsky S-92 heavy helicopters into the fleet.

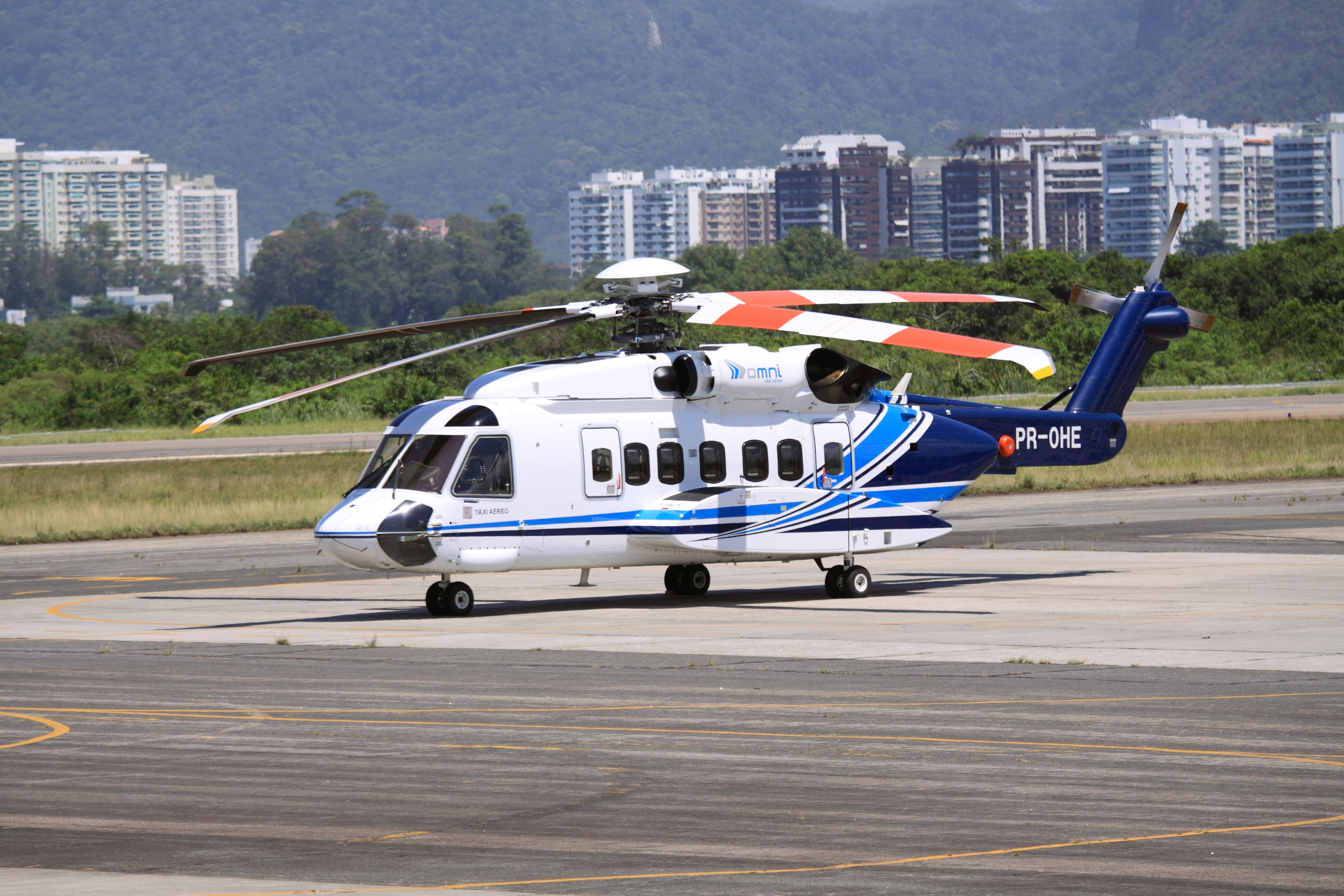
Sikorsky S-92A reg. PR-OHE on the Jacarepaguá Airport apron

==== Integration of operations with Sênior Taxi Aéreo ====
In 2014, it acquired Sênior Taxi Aéreo and its helicopters, consolidating itself as the largest air taxi company in Brazil and market leader, with more than 900 employees and around 60 aircraft in operation. In 2015, a hangar was opened at Aracaju Santa Maria Airport.

==== Addition of fixed-wing aircraft to the fleet ====
In September 2018, to diversify its operations and increase the portfolio of services offered to the market, acquired an ATR 42-500 (MSN 554) from Nordic Aviation Capital (NAC) to offer charter flights in addition to improving the logistics of transporting employees and parts for its helicopters. The plane is occasionally hired by football teams to travel to matches both in Brazil and other South American countries, and by travel agencies.

==== 2020s ====
From November 2022, OMNI Táxi Aéreo established an operations base at Oiapoque Airport, in the border with French Guiana, and moved its turboprop aircraft to the northern region, regularly deploying it on flights from Macapá International Airport to transport Petrobras workers to Oiapoque, for oil and gas exploration on the coast of Amapá.

On January 1st, 2023, OMNI Helicopters Guyana Inc. (OHGI), a subsidiary of Omni Helicopters International (OHI) began its international operations in Guyana, establishing the Eugene F. Correia International Airport, in Georgetown, as its Guyanese operations center and supported on the Brazilian air taxi company´s AOC. The group won a five-year contract with American multinational oil company ExxonMobil to support its offshore oil and gas extraction operations, initially with a fleet of seven Leonardo AW139 and Sikorsky S-92A helicopters.

In December 2023, upon completing 22 years of operations, it reached the milestone of 5 million passengers transported. In 2024, the company expects to reach the mark of 80 helicopters.

In February 2024, OMNI reached an agreement with the Dominican airline SKYhigh Dominicana for the operation of a series of charter flights between Eduardo Gomes International Airport, in Manaus, and Cheddi Jagan International Airport, in Georgetown, to transport workers and support the logistics of its helicopter operations in Guyana. The first of these flights was operated on February 29, 2024.

== Fleet ==
OMNI Táxi Aéreo fleet consists of the following aircraft (as of April 2024):

OMNI Táxi Aéreo fleet
Aircraft	Total	Passengers	Note
Airbus EC135	1	7	opf Revo Air Mobility
Airbus EC155	3	13	opf Revo Air Mobility
Airbus EC175	4	16	
Airbus EC225 Super Puma	1	18	
Leonardo AW139	32	15	Four based in Guyana opf OHGI
Leonardo AW189	2	16	
Sikorsky S-76C+/++	11	12	
Sikorsky S-92A	15	19	Two based in Guyana opf OHGI
TOTAL	70		

== See also ==
- List of airlines of Brazil
