= Dux Express =

Brazilian airline

Dux Express Transportes Aéreos
IATA	ICAO	Call sign
—	—	DUX EXPRESS
- Founded: September 10, 2020; 6 years ago (as Apollo Express Táxi Aéreo)
- Commenced operations: November 20, 2021; 4 years ago
- AOC #: 9,930 - December 2, 2022
- Operating bases: Jundiaí Airport
- Fleet size: 2 (as of November 2024)
- Destinations: 3 (as of November 2024)
- Parent company: Dux Logistics (Go Dux)
- Traded as: Dux Express
- Headquarters: Jundiaí, Brazil
- Key people: Raphael Rossi (CEO)
- Website: www.go-dux.com

Dux Express Transportes Aéreos, known as Dux Express, is a Brazilian air taxi, non-scheduled passenger and cargo airline headquartered in Jundiaí, São Paulo. The company is the air transport arm of Dux Logistics (Go Dux), a Brazilian multinational that operates in the air, sea and road cargo transportation segment across Brazil, France and the United States.

== History ==
=== Establishment (2020–2021) ===
==== Background ====
The airline was founded under the corporate name Apollo Express Táxi Aéreo in September 2020 by Dux Logistics, a Brazilian multinational logistics company, initiating in the same period its certification process with the National Civil Aviation Agency of Brazil (ANAC) to obtain the Air Operator Certificate (AOC) under RBAC No. 135.

In the first half of 2021, Dux Express reserved aeronautical registrations for four aircraft through the Brazilian Aeronautical Registry (RAB); on June 1 of the same year, it brought its first aircraft to Brazil, the Cessna C208B Grand Caravan with the US aeronautical registration N226JP (MSN 208B2426). After its nationalization process in Brazil, the first aircraft received the registration PS-DUA, being used in the airline's certification flights.

On November 5, 2021, just over a year after starting its certification process, Dux Express obtained the AOC No. 2021-11-00HL-01-01 from ANAC. It was published through Ordinance 6,381, of November 10, 2021, published in the Diário Oficial da União (DOU).

=== Early operations (2021–present) ===
On November 20, 2021, ten days after the publication of the ordinance granting its air operator certificate, Dux Express began cargo flights from its base of operations at Jundiaí Airport. The airline's first regular cargo destinations were Vitória and Rio de Janeiro (Galeão).

On January 24, 2022, the company received its second Cessna Grand Caravan, which received the aeronautical registration PS-DUB (MSN 208B0723).

On March 17, 2022, Dux Logistics, owner of the airline, announced an investment of R$100 million to expand Dux Express' operations, with the acquisition of up to 10 aircraft and the construction of a hangar at Jundiai Airport.

==== DEC Linhas Aéreas ====
On August 11, 2022, the aviation specialist portal AeroIN revealed that Dux Logistics, through its subsidiary Dux Express, began the process of creating a new airline, to be called DEC Linhas Aéreas. The new airline has begun its certification process with ANAC to operate under RBAC No. 121. This is because Dux Express, under its certification under RBAC No. 135, is only authorized to operate aircraft with a capacity for up to 19 passengers and/or a maximum cargo capacity of up to 3,400 kilos, which would limit the acquisition of aircraft with a greater cargo capacity than the Cessna Grand Caravan, slowing down the company's expansion plans.

On September 22, 2022, Dux Express signed a Letter of Intent (LOI) with French aeronautical startup Aura Aero for the acquisition of 20 units of the 19-seat hybrid-electric regional passenger aircraft ERA (Electric Regional Aircraft). They are expected to enter service from 2028.

== Destinations ==
As an air taxi and non-scheduled airline, Dux Express offers ad-hoc flights for both passengers and air cargo to meet the demand of customers and partners. However, as a cargo airline, it offers regular flights to the following destinations in Brazil (as of November 2024):

Base
Future
Terminated

Dux Express destinations
State	City	Airport	Notes
Espírito Santo	Vitória	Eurico de Aguiar Salles Airport	opf Dux Logistics
Rio de Janeiro	Rio de Janeiro	Galeão International Airport	opf Dux Logistics
São Paulo	Jundiaí	Comandante Rolim Adolfo Amaro State Airport	HUB

== Fleet ==
=== Current fleet ===
As of November 2024, the Dux Express fleet is made up of Cessna 208 Caravan aircraft, which in Brazil are certified to carry up to 9 passengers, as well as a crew of two pilots. Because it is utilitarian and quite versatile, the model can be quickly reconfigured for cargo transportation with the removal of the seats.

Dux Express fleet
Aircraft	In Service	Orders	Passengers	Note
Cessna 208B Grand Caravan	2	—	Cargo	QC for 9 Y seats
TOTAL	2	—		

== See also ==
- List of airlines of Brazil
