= Piquiatuba Transportes Aéreos =

Domestic airline in Brazil

IATA	ICAO	Call sign
-	-	PIQUIATUBA
- Founded: 2005
- AOC #: 9,824 - November 22, 2022
- Fleet size: 5
- Parent company: Piquiatuba Táxi Aéreo
- Headquarters: Santarém, Brazil
- Key people: Armando Amancio da Silva
- Website: www.piquiatuba.com.br

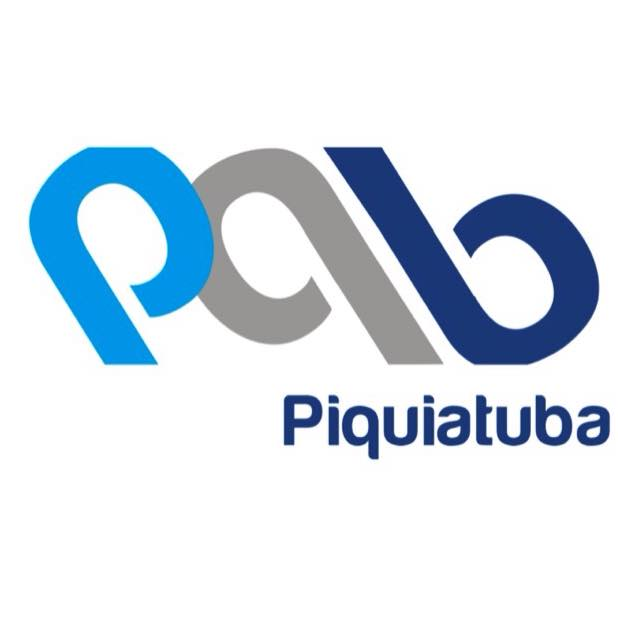
Old logo

Piquiatuba Transportes Aéreos is a domestic airline based in Santarém, Pará, Brazil. Founded in 2005 it operates regular charter flights.

The company owns Piquiatuba Airfield (SNCJ) where most of its aircraft are kept and maintained.

== History ==
Piquiatuba was founded in 2005. It ceased to offer regular services and now concentrates its activities in air taxi.

== Destinations ==
As of July 2016 Piquiatuba operated regular services to the following destinations:

City	Airport Code		Airport	Note
City	IATA	ICAO	Airport	Note
Altamira	ATM	SBHT	Altamira Airport	
Belém	BEL	SBBE	Val de Cans–Júlio Cezar Ribeiro International Airport	
Itaituba	ITB	SBIH	Itaituba Airport	
Novo Progresso	NPR	SJNP	Novo Progresso Airport	
Parnaíba	PHB	SBPB	Pref. Dr. João Silva Filho International Airport	
Picos	PCS	SNPC	Picos Airport	
Santarém	STM	SBSN	Maestro Wilson Fonseca Airport	
São Raimundo Nonato	SRN	SWKQ	Serra da Capivara Airport	
Teresina	THE	SBTE	Sen. Petrônio Portella Airport	

== Fleet ==
As of July 2015 the fleet of Piquiatuba Transportes Aéreas included the following aircraft:

Piquiatuba fleet
Aircraft	Total	Orders	Passengers (Y)	Notes
Cessna 208B Grand Caravan	2	0	9	
Embraer EMB120 Brasília	1 (as of August 2019)	0	30	
Embraer EMB810 Sêneca	1			

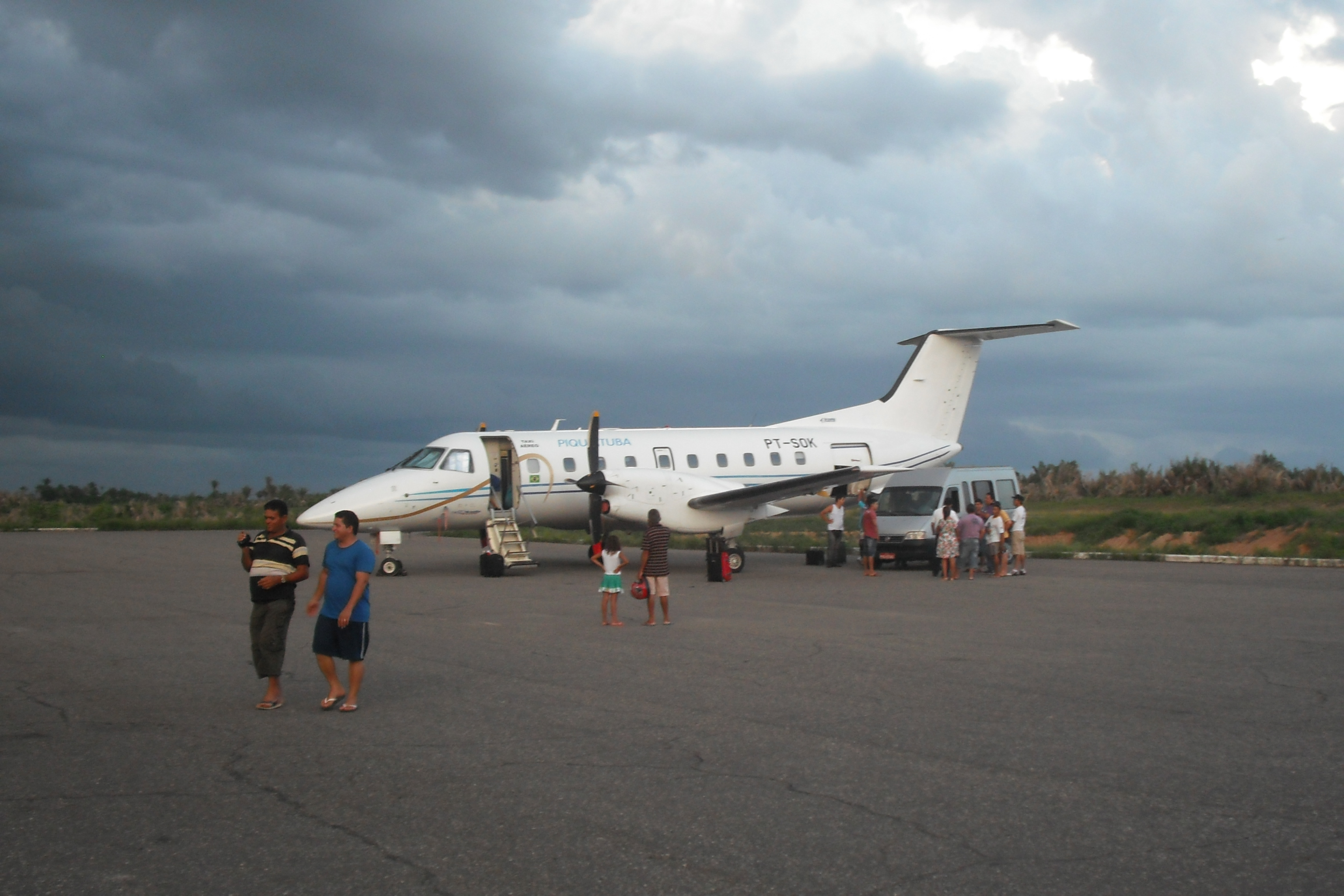
Piquiatuba EMB120 Brasília

== Accidents and incidents ==
- 25 January 2010: an Embraer EMB 110C Bandeirante registration PT-TAF operating a flight from Belém to Senador José Porfírio sustained substantial damage during a forced landing. The captain and one of the passengers were killed. The aircraft was en route to Senador José Porfírio at an altitude of 2500 feet when the no.1 engine showed an increase in TIT (Turbine Inlet Temperature). The captain throttled back the engine, but the aircraft was not able to maintain altitude. The crew attempted to locate their destination airport but were unable. A forced landing was carried out 4 km from the airport.
- 7 September 2017: A Cessna 210 registration PT-KKK on a medevac flight to Piquiatuba (SNCJ), 16 km southeast of the airport. The airplane lost engine power and diverted to Santarém. Unable to reach the runway, the pilot decided to land the aircraft on a beach 4 km east of the runway. All 4 people on board survived. The investigation concluded the airplane did not have enough fuel for the flights it made, ultimately resulting in the crash due to fuel starvation to the engine. This accident resulted in Brazil's Aeronautical Accidents Investigation and Prevention Center (CENIPA) recommending the suspension of Piquiatuba Taxi Aéreo's license due to poor operational safety management.

== See also ==
- List of airlines of Brazil
