= Líder Aviação =

Brazilian airline

- Líder Aviação logo
| IATA | ICAO | Call sign |
|---|---|---|
| - | - | LID |
- Founded: 12 November 1958
- AOC #: 9,182 - September 15, 2022
- Operating bases: Congonhas-São Paulo International Airport, São Paulo-Guarulhos International Airport, Santos Dumont Airport, Rio de Janeiro-Galeão International Airport, Brasília International Airport, Guararapes International Airport, Val de Cães International Airport, Eurico de Aguiar Salles Airport, Deputado Luís Eduardo Magalhães International Airport, Salgado Filho International Airport, Santa Maria Airport (Sergipe), and Eduardo Gomes International Airport
- Fleet size: See Fleet below
- Headquarters: Belo Horizonte, Brazil

Líder Aviação (Líder Aviation) is a Brazilian airline specialising in air charter, aircraft sales and aircraft maintenance. Its main base is in Belo Horizonte, Minas Gerais, where it has a presence at both airports. It has other bases throughout Brazil; at Congonhas Airport and Guarulhos International Airport in São Paulo, Santos Dumont Airport, Jacarepaguá Airport and Galeão International Airport in Rio de Janeiro, Brasília International Airport, Recife's Guararapes International Airport, Macaé Airport, Val de Cães International Airport in Belém, Vitória Airport, Salvador International Airport, Porto Alegre's Salgado Filho International Airport, Santa Maria Airport (Sergipe), and Eduardo Gomes International Airport in Manaus. Bristow Group, a large U.S.-based helicopter operator with worldwide operations supporting the offshore oil and gas industry, has a 41,9 % stake in Lider.

== History ==
Líder Taxi Aéreo was established on 12 November 1958 in Belo Horizonte with three Cessna 170A four-seat single-engine aircraft. By 1961 the company had grown to 20 employees and 12 Cessna 180s and 182s and that year added the first twin-engine aircraft to the fleet, a Beechcraft D18S. Operations were concentrated on the Belo Horizonte - Ipatinga route and the company also provided support flights during development of the mining region of Minas Gerais. In 1963 three Aero Commander 500Bs entered service and the company expanded into sales and maintenance with a new hangar at Belo Horizonte's Pampulha Airport. After opening of a branch at the Santos Dumont Airport in Rio de Janeiro the following year, the company's fleet played a strategic role during construction of the Três Marias and Salto Grande Dams, by connecting the sites to the country's main cities. In 1965 Líder established a base at Congonhas and was also floated as a public company. In 1968 the company imported the first business jet into Brazil, a Learjet 24. The following year saw further expansion, with the opening of a branch in the new capital city Brasília and increased freight traffic between Belo Horizonte and Rio de Janeiro, carrying newspapers out of Rio and beer on the return flights.

In 1971 Líder was appointed by Learjet as its sales agent in Brazil. In 1973 the company commenced offshore helicopter operations on behalf of Petrobras, linking oil-drilling platforms along the Brazilian coast. In 1978 the company entrenched itself in Belo Horizonte when it moved into a new central administration office building in the city. In the 1980s Líder expanded its partnerships with US aerospace organisations, becoming the Brazilian agent for Bell Helicopter Textron, Garrett AiResearch and a number of avionics manufacturers, and entering a partnership with FlightSafety International. By 1988 Líder employed over 600 people.

In 1995 Líder terminated its sales agreement with Learjet in favour of a new relationship with the Raytheon Aircraft Company (RAC), at that time the manufacturer of Beechcraft and Hawker piston engine, and corporate turboprop and jet aircraft. That year the company moved into the-then largest hangar in South America, at Congonhas Airport; it was built with space for 40 business jets and 30 helicopters. The company also took delivery of its first Sikorsky S-76 helicopter. In 1999 Líder placed orders for three Bell/Agusta BA609s. In 2002 the fleet was 18 fixed-wing aircraft and 29 helicopters. That year the company opened bases in Belém and Recife.

== Fleet ==
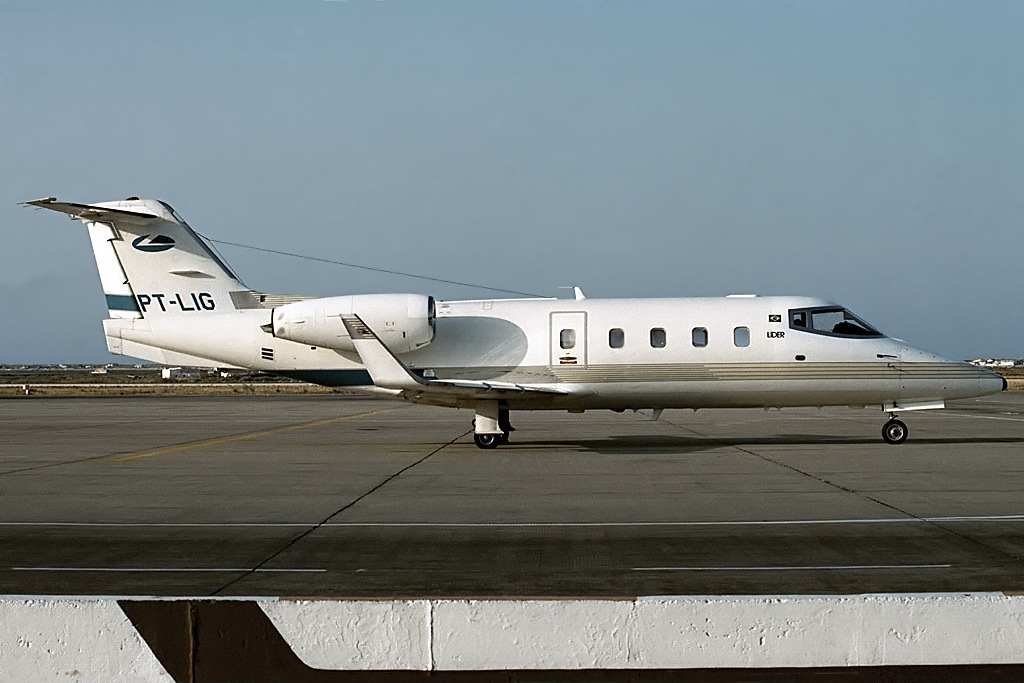
Líder Aviação Bombardier Learjet 55

The Líder Aviação fleet includes

- Beechcraft C90 King Air
- Beechcraft F90 King Air
- Bell 206B Jet Ranger
- Bell 206L Long Ranger
- Bell 212
- Bell 222
- Bell 407
- Bell 412SP
- Bell 430
- MBB/Kawasaki BK 117 D-2
- British Aerospace BAe 125-800
- Learjet 35
- Learjet 35A
- Raytheon 390 Premier 1
- Raytheon 400A Beechjet
- Sikorsky S-76A
- Sikorsky S-76C+
- Sikorsky S-92

== Accidents and incidents ==
- 26 January 2007: a Raytheon 400A registration PR-MMS started the takeoff race from Aoucarana and shortly after leaving the ground, there was a collision, apparently, with the landing gear, against a cameraman positioned in the center of the runway, who died instantly. The aircraft continued its flight to São Paulo–Congonhas.

== See also ==
- List of airlines of Brazil
