= History of non-scheduled airlines in the United States =

Airline of the United States

The history of non-scheduled airlines in the United States records the rise and fall of a uniquely unencumbered sector of the heavily regulated American airline industry from the end of World War II to the Airline Deregulation Act of 1978. Frequently operating in the shadow of colossal national airlines, which received federal subsidies and flew scheduled passenger service at costly rates, non-scheduled airlines were generally small companies which could be chartered to transport goods or passengers at an hourly or distance-based charge. Non-scheduled airlines were the first to introduce 'aircoach' fares for civilian air travel in the late 1940s, and brought about the low-rate service offered by almost all airlines operating today.

Non-scheduled airlines first appeared in significant numbers in the United States after the Second World War, as returning pilots purchased discount surplus planes from the government and set up their own uncertificated air services under the non-scheduled charter service exemption in the 1938 Civil Aviation Act. Low overhead and fewer regulations allowed the non-scheduled airlines to offer considerably lower fares than the national scheduled carriers, inaugurating the immensely popular aircoach service which attracted millions of Americans unable to afford tickets on the regular airlines. Though the regulatory actions of the Civil Aeronautics Board ultimately extinguished the burgeoning non-scheduled industry, the idea of cheap, efficient air transport endured and by the passage of the 1978 Airline Deregulation Act nearly all civil airlines had transitioned to an aircoach model.

== Origins ==
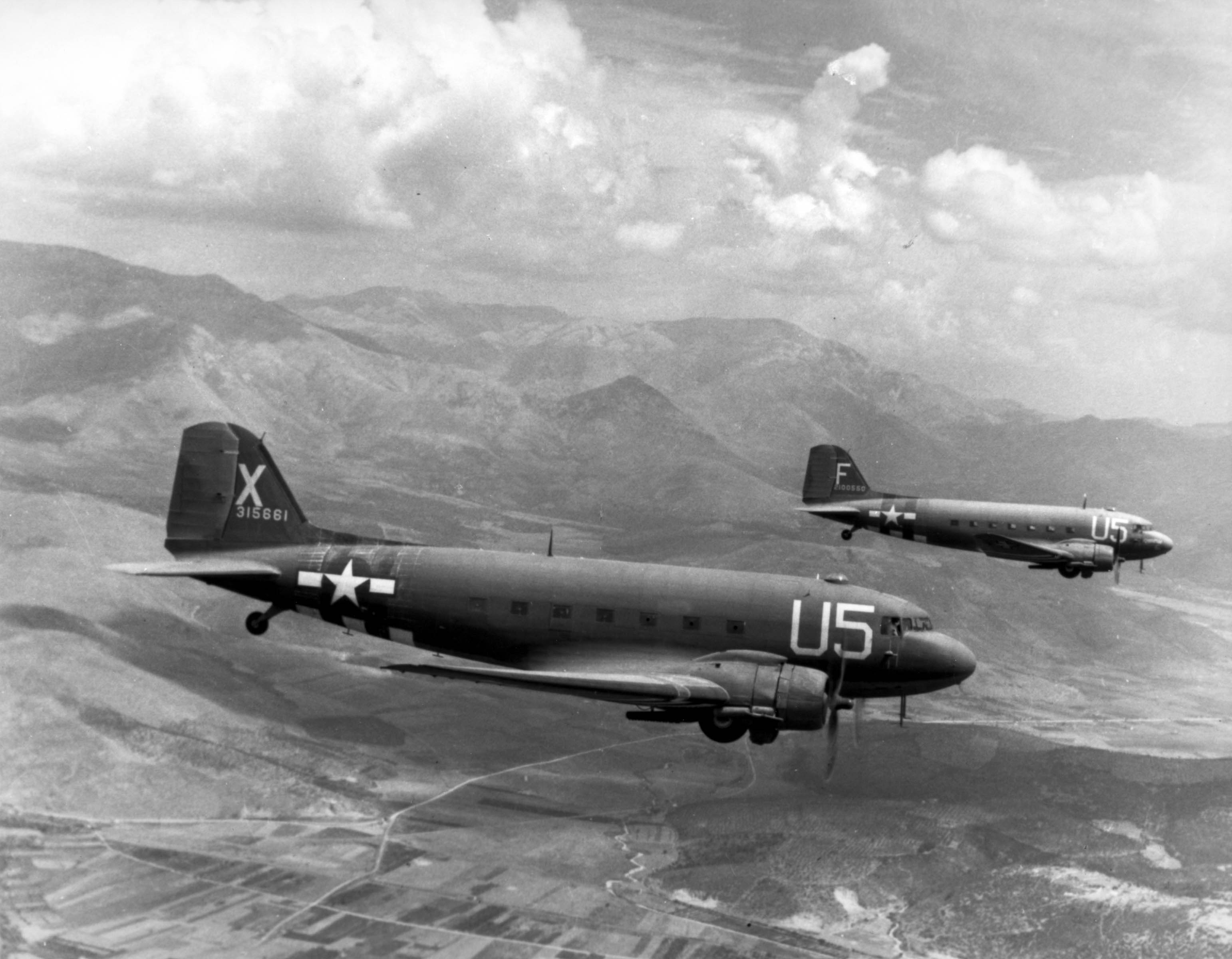
Two USAAF C-47A Skytrains (converted Douglas DC-3s) from the 81st Troop Carrier Squadron, loaded with paratroopers invading southern France (Operation Dragoon)

The first non-scheduled airlines arose from the industrial and human fallout of the Second World War. The wartime United States aviation industry had, upon the orders of President Franklin Delano Roosevelt, escalated the production of aircraft from a few thousand a year to more than 4,000 each month, and the training centers of the U.S. Army Air Force produced the pilots to fly them. Peace brought these airmen, who often possessed no other skills, back to a country where immense stores of surplus military aircraft were being sold at discount rates to former servicemen. Under the 1938 legislation of the Civil Aviation Authority, the federal agency responsible for regulating civil aviation until 1940, all air carriers providing scheduled air service across states required an official certificate to operate, the Certificate of Public Convenience and Necessity. The certificate demanded compliance with economic as well as safety standards, which meant all certificated companies were subject to the CAA's stringent control over fares, routes, and business practices. Nonscheduled air service, which then referred to light aircraft individually chartered to transport cargo, was exempt.

Snapping up $25,000 Douglas DC-3s, the legendary utility plane which operated in numbers exceeding 10,000 during the war, enterprising pilots established their own freight carriers with ease under the 1938 exemption. A glut of such companies appeared—2,730 in 1946 alone according to the Civil Aeronautics Board (CAB), which replaced the CAA in 1940. They had such names as Fireball Air Express or Viking Air Lines, and commonly were operated by a lone individual with some money given by fellow GIs, or in rare cases a bank loan. For most the romantic venture ended in failure; many former fighter pilots found themselves unsuited to the steady cross-country cruising, the bookkeeping required to stay solvent, and the long-term maintenance. With a safety record 14-25 times worse than their scheduled counterparts, the nonscheduled companies (or 'non-skeds', as they came to be called) faced swift punishment from the CAB, which began widely shutting down operations that were found unsafe or "financially unfit". CAB retribution was not the most immediate threat to the non-skeds' continued existence, however, and it soon became apparent there were too few contracts to support the influx of new businesses. Hundreds of thinly financed operations went bankrupt within a few months, and ruthless competition for work turned into suicidal rate slashing as non-sked owners undercut air, rail, and naval shipping to prices that failed even to cover their fuel costs. Such cutthroat practices and the poor safety record earned the non-skeds' an ineffaceable reputation as the aviation industry's seedy underbelly. Savvy non-skeds averted extinction in the late 1940s only by breaching into another market with an innovative service: the aircoach.

Though passenger travel was never intended under the economic regulation exemption enjoyed by nonscheduled airlines, its adoption became essential to their business. Because of their low overhead and few amenities, the non-skeds were able to charge close to 40% less than the traditional airlines, with $99.00 fares from Los Angeles to New York City versus $159.00 on a standard carrier. Moreover, unfettered from timetables non-skeds could delay flights until they were full or nearly full, while scheduled airlines had to charge exorbitant prices to ensure profit on half-empty planes. The non-skeds found a large and willing market for this new service, frequently advertised as 'aircoach' in reference to the established use of 'coach' to mean respectable middle-class travel on trains and ships. Americans who had never flown before could now afford the luxury formerly reserved for men of business; non-skeds flourished around population-dense cities with big airports. The west coast experienced a remarkable proliferation of nonscheduled passenger airlines, especially near Los Angeles in places like Burbank or Long Beach where land for a dirt airfield could be cheaply obtained. On the east coast Newark and Trenton in New Jersey were popular hangar bases for non-skeds, and the Miami-Caribbean circuit out of Florida was as trafficked as it was lucrative. One route, from San Juan to New York, facilitated the mass migration of Puerto Ricans seeking opportunity on the mainland who came in numbers exceeding 6,000 each month and settled in squalid conditions in East Harlem. But while the nonscheduled airlines' fares were unmatched throughout the industry, their service quality was frequently unreliable.

The low-fare model required that flights be relatively full, and it was a common occurrence when flying on a non-scheduled airline for customers to learn at the airport their flight had been delayed until tomorrow so that the airline could sell more tickets. Because most companies had only a few planes and just the staff to crew them, delays as a result of weather or mechanical failure could completely incapacitate the airline, forcing it to cancel or postpone flights for which tickets had already been sold. No refunds were given on such tickets, and on one occasion the Burbank police responded to calls from a nearby airfield where an angry crowd of passengers were demanding access to an overbooked flight. Some of the nocturnal nonscheduled carriers attempted to evade landing fees at their destinations by covertly slipping in and out of airports in the middle of the night. However, with the founding of the Aircoach Transportation Association, the trade association and lobbying group of the non-scheduled airlines, stricter policies of etiquette, safety, and consumer protection became standard across the industry. By the close of 1946 non-skeds had become a definite presence within the aviation industry, and they found themselves looked unfavorably upon by executives at the old established airlines.

== Conflict ==
Major scheduled airlines—the likes of United, American, and TWA—were still receiving federal subsidies and airmail pay when they began lobbying the CAB to protect their interests against the upstart nonscheduled airlines. The CAB, charged originally with promoting competition to the benefit of the consumer, acceded to the airlines' demands and on 5 May 1947 enacted new regulatory measures targeting nonscheduled airlines—now termed 'irregular carriers'. The measures distinguished between Small Irregular Carriers, services operating light chartered aircraft weighing less than 10,000 pounds when fully loaded (changed in 1949 to 12,500), and Large Irregular Carriers, those flying equipment, the DC-3 for example, in excess of that weight. The small remained unrestricted, but the large carriers faced a host of new economic and safety regulations along with a warning to adhere to 'infrequent and irregular' service. The most important of the new rules was the need for a Letter of Registration in order to fly large aircraft; the CAB issued 142 of these in 1947 but stopped in August 1948 when the board began an investigation of the practices of large irregular carriers, which it accused of operating as scheduled services. Earlier that year the CAB had instituted what became known as the "3 and 8 rule" which limited nonscheduled airlines' monthly flights to eight between any two U.S. cities and three on specified high-density routes. No non-sked could feasibly sustain itself on such a slim diet, and the measure was viewed as a death sentence by leaders of the irregular air industry. Nonetheless, a select group of non-skeds not only persevered but prospered in the ensuing years, though many were far from scrupulous in their observance of the CAB's economic constraints.

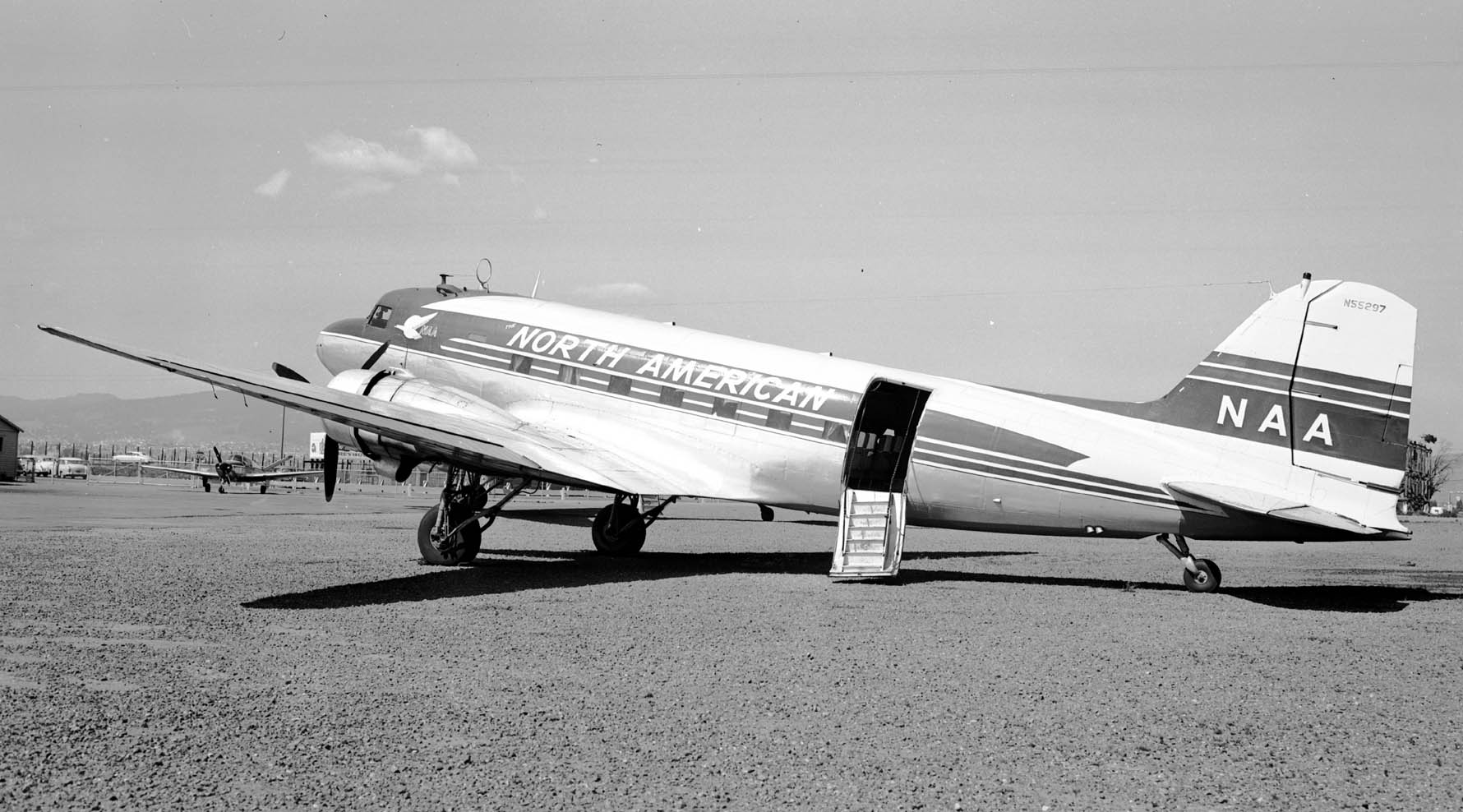
A North American Airlines DC-3 in May 1955.

One such entrepreneur was the co-founder of Fireball Air Express, Stanley D. Weiss, who early in 1949 formed a ticketing agency called North American Airlines with Ross R. Hart and Jack B. Lewin, the founders of his principal competitor Viking Air Lines. While the individual companies retained their Letters of Registration, and therefore their monthly allowance of flights, North American Airlines sold the tickets, advertised its brand, and arranged their flights. In effect, Weiss created a conglomerate which doubled the number of monthly flights allotted to his company and rebranded the technically disparate components with the North American Airlines logo, such that any passenger would believe they were dealing with a single entity. He then acquired more nonscheduled airlines—Twentieth Century Airlines, Trans-American Airlines, Trans-National Airlines, and Hemisphere Air Transport—to bring North American Airlines' de facto fleet to 14 DC-3s and 1 DC-4, and to ensure the "3 and 8" limit would never again strangle their business. Another non-sked businessman named Irving Herman became Weiss' chief competitor through a similar scheme called Super Skycoach, which comprised Great Lakes Airlines, Currey Air Transport, and Trans Alaskan Airlines held together by the Trans Continental Airlines ticketing agency. In setting up his evasive business, however, Herman acted with greater caution than Weiss, whose bold maneuver attracted the ire of both scheduled airlines and the CAB.

In January 1949, the CAB concluded its investigation and announced plans to roll out significantly harsher regulations along with a series of punitive measures aimed at irregular air carriers, all of which were presumed guilty of some infraction during the preceding years. The new mandate would suspend each large irregular passenger carrier's license to operate pending a thorough review, and restrict the non-skeds' flight limit even further to varied weekly flights and four round trips per month between any two destinations. Additionally, the CAB introduced statutes prohibiting cost-sharing between non-skeds and requiring that each have their own ticketing agencies, effectively banning the elusive combine schemes.

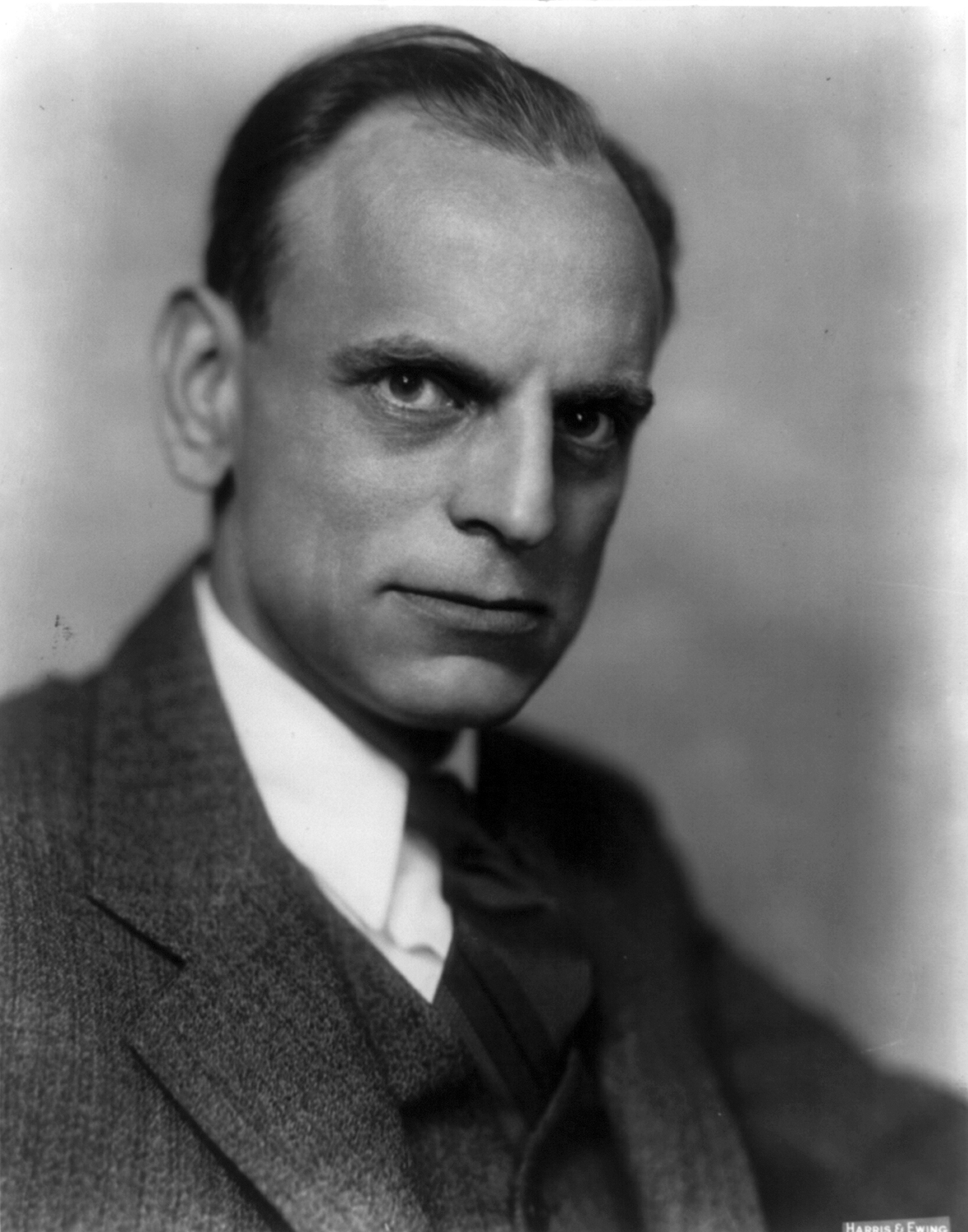
James McCauley Landis, hailed as one of the best legal minds of the century, briefly headed the CAB and planned to liberalize air regulation before a dramatic fall from power.

The response was collective and vehement outrage. In hearings at the Capitol, representatives of the nonscheduled airlines denounced the CAB as the servant of major scheduled carriers that "have used every conceivable and questionable device to force the healthful competition of the irregular carriers out of existence", as said by James Fischgrund. One lawyer called the proposed action "wholesale injustice by the shotgun method." The representatives acknowledged that a few "bad apples" existed within the non-scheduled industry, but vociferously denied that all non-skeds purposefully violated CAB stricture and deserved a blanket punishment. They also defended their usefulness to the American public, arguing they provided access to air travel for the 90% of Americans who could not afford the regular carriers' fares, and inspired some degree of competition that was previously nonexistent under the CAB's tight economic controls. The New York Port Authority and, unexpectedly, the Department of Justice contributed their support to the non-skeds' cause, requesting that the CAB delay its order until the value of the nonscheduled airline industry could be reassessed. The CAB offered no such reprieve. On 14 April 1949 the CAB notified large irregular carriers they had thirty days from the effective date of 20 May to apply for interim licenses while the new order took effect.

That same month the Senate Interstate and Foreign Commerce Committee, which had been investigating why scheduled carriers were still unprofitable despite federal subsidies of $100,000,000, turned its attention to the plight of the non-skeds. Senator Edwin C. Johnson, president of the committee, gathered testimony from the nonscheduled airline representatives, the leadership of the CAB, independent fiscal and legal analysts, the former CAB chairman James M. Landis, and Robert Ramspeck, executive vice president of the Air Transport Association, which represented the regular carriers. After three months of hearings, Johnson presented his findings to the CAB with a formal request that the nonscheduled airlines' licenses be reinstated and the stringent measures repealed. Again, the CAB declined. The chairman, Joseph J. O'Connell Jr., replied that to comply with senator Johnson's demand "would be to condone flagrant violations of our regulations in the past and encourage disrespect for them in the future."

Less than thirty days later the CAB filed its first round of criminal charges with the Department of Justice against Standard Air Lines, the company run by the nonscheduled airlines' most prominent spokesperson, James Fischgrund. The CAB accused Standard of violating its "irregular" doctrine by flying more frequently than permitted, offering a service indistinguishable from the scheduled airlines. On 21 July the United States Court of Appeals for the District of Columbia rejected Fischgrund's appeal and ordered Standard to cease and desist. Viking Air Lines was next, eliminated in June 1950 for operating excessive flights and charging fares not prescribed by the CAB. Seaboard & Western Airlines and Transocean Air Lines, though spared, were censured and ordered to immediately discontinue practices not expressly approved in the CAB's regulations under penalty of dissolution. By 11 June 1950, there were 96 nonscheduled airlines left in the country.

That this many remained despite a concerted effort by the CAB to put them out of business was due entirely to the Cold War. In times of national emergency the non-skeds undertook scores of cargo and passenger contracts from the military, fulfilling an essential service to the country while sustaining their enterprises. Seaboard & Western, Transocean, and Slick Airways notably aided the US Air Force in performing the Berlin Airlift in 1948–1949. The non-skeds transported supplies across the country and the Atlantic Ocean to Rhein-Main Air Base, where the Air Force and Navy's combined fleet of C-54s was continuously engaged in airdropping necessary commodities into West Berlin. And again once the United Nations approved a US-led intervention in Korea in 1950, non-skeds took on the role of flying men and matériel to Japan, where the military transported them to the front. 50% of all cargo and personnel brought to the conflict were delivered by nonscheduled airlines, with special note going to Transocean and National Overseas Airways. The non-skeds proved to be the only non-military transports capable of carrying out such a colossal effort without receiving advance warning or impacting the domestic commercial network of the United States. Financial security was not the only benefit non-skeds enjoyed from their relationship with the armed forces, however—the respect of the military gave them a crucial ally in government with the potential to counterbalance the CAB.

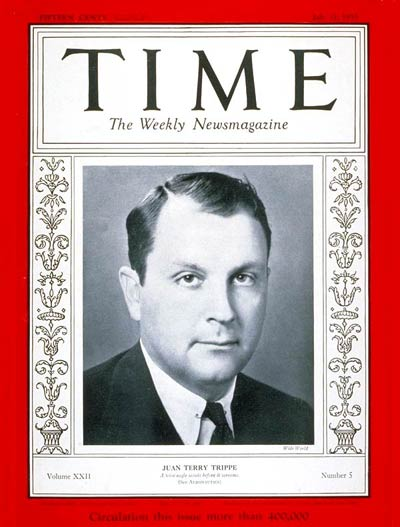
Juan Trippe on the cover of a 1933 issue of Time Magazine

Meanwhile, the scheduled airlines still had to deal with those non-scheduled airlines successfully flying passenger service. Their low fares had tapped into a vast market of potential customers which the CAB's strict fare regulations made inaccessible to scheduled carriers. The scheduled airlines, furthermore, had to service unprofitable routes and regions as a condition of their federal subsidies, forcing them to raise fares on their gainful flights to compensate. In November 1948 Capital Airlines, a minor scheduled carrier, won approval from the CAB to begin nightly coach service between New York and Chicago. The other scheduled carriers watched as Capital's new offering replicated the success of the nonscheduled airlines, and soon began petitioning the CAB to authorize their own low-fare lines. Juan Trippe, President of Pan-American Airlines, had established a $75.00 one-way service between San Juan and New York in September 1948, and by 1950 each of the "Big Four" airlines (American, United, Eastern, and TWA) offered 'tourist-class' service with pared down amenities and prices attractive to the average middle-class American. Of course, each route had to be confirmed by the CAB, which, scantily staffed, was notoriously lethargic in its dealings. Several routes for which demand clearly existed lacked coach service well into the subsequent decade, acting as a continual source of embarrassment for the board, which insisted that federally backed scheduled airlines perfectly served the needs of the American public.

== Fall ==
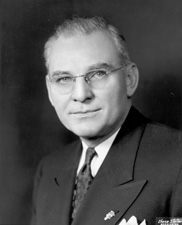
Senator Edward J. Thye

Over the early 1950s the CAB further increased its powers over large irregular carriers and continued investigating their operations. In 1952 the CAB implemented new rules for pilots at nonscheduled airlines, requiring compliance with stricter standards of training and experience. The CAB also won jurisdiction over ticketing agencies from Congress, enabling the Board to take action against the likes of North American Airlines, the largest and most lucrative of the combine schemes. The Aircoach Transport Association, however, expressed its approval of CAB-controlled ticketing agencies. For, many of the nonscheduled airlines had developed an unhealthy dependence upon agencies, and in the last few years ticket-sellers had begun exploiting their relationship by demanding higher commissions from their clients, in some cases 50% of earned revenue. But the ATA found little else worthy of approbation in the CAB's actions, and on 30 March 1953 its general manager Hamlin B. Johnston issued a statement accusing the CAB of executing "a planned program to destroy the independent airline industry." A meeting of the Senate Subcommittee on Small Business Relations with Government convened to investigate, this time under the chairmanship of Senator Edward J. Thye, and uncovered an internal CAB memorandum written by Louis Goodkind in 1948. Goodkind, then chief of economic relations and now leader of the Board's investigation into irregular airlines, had detailed a plot to eradicate the industry by tightening regulations until all "undesirables" were vanquished.

Finally, the nonscheduled airlines had proof that the CAB sought to do more than enforce its regulations; the Board tried to eliminate the only profitable sector of America's air travel industry, either under pressure from certificated carriers or in fear of the chaos a deregulated airspace might cause. But the divulgence of the Goodkind memo, the military's recent commendation of the non-skeds, and the Senate committee's continued exhortations forced the Board's leadership to reverse course. In May 1955, the Board still tentatively opposed nonscheduled airlines, as demonstrated by a newly published report recommending that half their number be terminated—but by November of that year the most radical liberalizing legislation since the original loophole in the Civil Aeronautics Act of 1938 was introduced.|

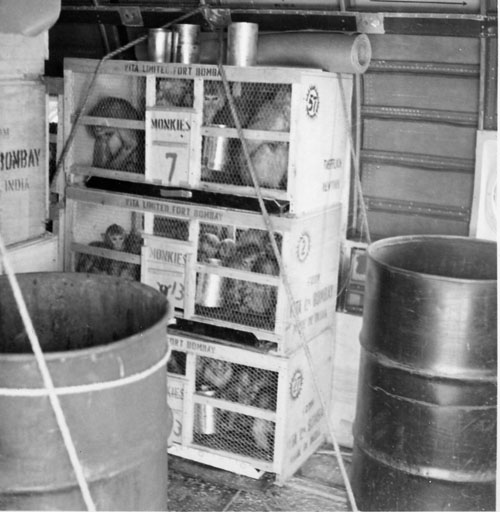
Caged monkeys aboard a Transocean flight in the mid-1950s, transported in the thousands from India to make Polio vaccines

The Board's new regulations permitted large irregular carriers, rebranded "Supplemental Airlines", to operate ten individually ticketed flights a month between any two points, without regard to frequency, regularity, route density, or any other metric. Furthermore, no limits were placed on flights chartered by a group renting the entire plane, or on transporting cargo. After a decade of hostility from the public and private sectors, the nonscheduled airlines were elated to finally join the accepted members of the commercial aviation community; they eagerly awaited the effective starting date of 1 January 1956. On 15 December 1955, however, the scheduled carriers and railroads intervened. Both groups feared the nonscheduled airlines' low fares, and individually petitioned the board to reconsider its order. The case went to the United States Court of Appeals for the District of Columbia, which on 19 July 1956 announced its unanimous ruling: The CAB order lacked sufficient evidence to justify the measure.

The effort to legitimize nonscheduled carriers had not died, however, and on 29 January 1959 the CAB created, after an exhaustive research process, the supplemental carrier class of airlines. 23 temporary Certificates of Public Convenience and Necessity were issued to those of the fifty or so remaining non-skeds that passed the application process, and these were subject to the terms of the failed 1955 regulation. The rest were ordered to cease doing business within sixty days. Again, the matter became embroiled in the courts: First, the US Court of Appeals in D.C. struck down the order as an overreach of the CAB's authority on 13 April 1960; next, the CAB successfully appealed to the United States Supreme Court for a final ruling; and finally, on 24 October 1960, the Supreme Court vacated the Circuit Court's decision until either the temporary certificates expired or Congress passed permanent legislation to address issue. Luckily for the supplemental carriers, 11 of whose certificates would have expired 29 January 1961, President Dwight D. Eisenhower signed a bill granting all certificated supplementals interim authority for twenty months while Congress deliberated. The legislature's final act on the question of these few surviving non-skeds came on 10 July 1962—but a series of catastrophes came first.

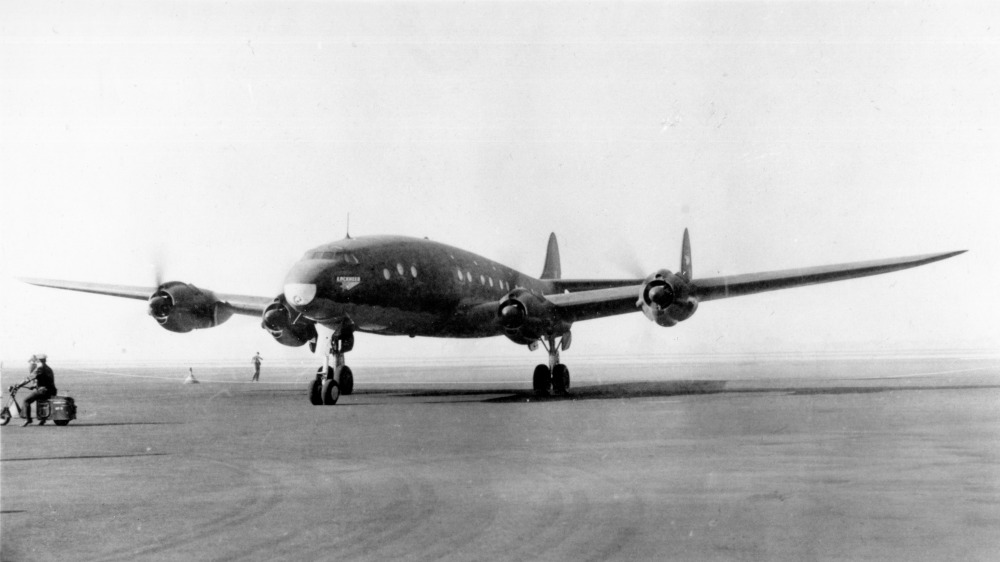
A Lockheed C-69 Constellation of the kind crashed by Imperial Airways on 9 November 1961.

For over a decade, the nonscheduled airlines' safety record earned the envy of the aviation industry. Most of them had won the National Safety Council's Aviation Safety Award for a year without accident and three years with below-average accident rates; many had earned the honor twice. But a 1961 study by the Federal Aviation Administration found that airlines suffering financially tended to experience a drop in safety standards, and by 1960 several of the extant supplementals were in poor fiscal health. The years of battling protean regulations and competing for a fluctuating supply of contracts had whittled the once-abundant non-skeds down to a few dozen companies, many of which barely limped along despite their updated classification. On 19 September 1960, a World Airways Douglas DC-6A took off from Guam carrying military personnel and their families, 80 of whom were killed when the plane crashed shortly thereafter. A C-46 flown by Arctic-Pacific Airlines crashed over Ohio on 29 October 1960, killing 22 of the 48 members of California Polytechnic Institute's returning football team. After making a wrong turn, President Airline's DC-6B crashed into the River Shannon on 10 September 1961 leaving 83 dead. 74 soldiers aboard an Imperial Airways flight died on 8 November 1961 when the Lockheed 069 Constellation hired to transport them crashed near Richmond, Virginia while attempting an emergency landing. Subsequent investigations found that crew fatigue, mechanical failures resulting from incompetent maintenance, and poorly trained pilots lay behind each disaster. In one case the crew had been flying without rest for more than 25 hours; in another the pilot had failed his flight test three times. These needless—and widely publicized—tragedies bore heavily upon the House representatives and senators as they crafted Public Law 87-528, passed on 10 July 1962.

According to the text of the law, currently certificated supplemental carriers would all need to reapply for a certificate, which, if granted, gave the bearer rights to operate chartered service for civilian or military contracts within an individually defined geographic area. Separately ticketed flights were not permitted unless a carrier demonstrated to the CAB's satisfaction that service in a specific area or along a certain route was needed. Competition, which had given rise to the non-skeds and perpetuated their existence, was thoroughly rooted out. Each would operate within their own delineated territory, and when the CAB did allow for scheduled service only one carrier per route was given the privilege. Just fifteen supplemental carriers obtained the certificate, and any providing ticketed passenger flights were ordered to transition to all-charter service by 10 July 1964.

Two carriers failed to make the transition, and the rest found themselves no safer after the deadline. Their principal source of revenue, the Military Air Transport Service (MATS), at first awarded contracts only to a select group of seven supplemental carriers represented by the National Air Carrier Association, an agency headed by Coates Lear. Lear also happened to be a business associate of the recently appointed Secretary of the Air Force. His sudden death in 1963 did not mean the end of the supplemental carriers' troubles with military contracts, however, as the escalation of the Vietnam War impelled MATS to demand greater standards from their contractors. MATS declared that in order to qualify for contracts supplemental carriers must earn at least 30% of their revenue from civilian-chartered services, a measure designed to attract only the most robust carriers. MATS soon added that only carriers flying jet aircraft could take their contracts. Within a few years, all but those in compliance with the MATS directives had fallen into bankruptcy, leaving the constricted group of some half-dozen supplemental carriers the lone progeny of the postwar non-skeds. The size of this cluster, though not its composition, remained constant through the following decade, until in 1976 the question of "The Decline of the Supplemental Carrier in the United States" appeared before the Senate Select Committee on Small Business. The hearings formed part of an accelerating trend toward deregulation in the commercial aviation industry, which culminated in the 1978 Airline Deregulation Act. In the years following the act's passage the entire structure of federal airline regulation was dismantled, including the CAB. Regulated classifications such as supplemental carrier or scheduled carrier disappeared as the government reintroduced competition between airlines, and a volatile ecosystem of civil aviation succeeded the CAB's stale bureaucracy. However, the Act also rendered nonscheduled airline service redundant, an innovation suited to an outmoded system of regulation; the last remaining airline founded as a nonscheduled carrier, World Airways, ceased operations in early 2014.

== Sources ==
Books

- Davies, R.E.G. (1987). Rebels and Reformers of the Airways. Washington, D.C. and London: Smithsonian Institution Press. ISBN 0874743540.
- Heppenheimer, T. A. (1995). Turbulent Skies: The History of Commercial Aviation. New York and Toronto: John Wiley & Sons, Inc. ISBN 0471196940.
- Solberg, Carl (1979). Conquest of the Skies: A History of Commercial Aviation in America. Boston and Toronto: Little, Brown, and Company. ISBN 0316803308.
- Davies, R.E.G.; Quastler, I. E. (1995). Commuter Airlines of the United States. Washington, D.C. and London: Smithsonian Institution Press. ISBN 156098404X.
- Corpening, John T. (2015). Forgotten Flights: Non-Scheduled, Large Irregular, Supplemental, and Specialty Airlines of the United States, 1945–1978 (Fifth ed.).

Other

- Stringer, David H. (November 2015). "Non-skeds: The Story of America's Supplemental Airlines". Airways Magazine.
