= List of airlines of Brazil =

This is a list of active airlines in Brazil holding an Air Operator Certificate issued by the National Civil Aviation Agency of Brazil as of September 21, 2026.

== Regular and non-regular ==
Airline	Image	IATA	ICAO	Callsign	AOC number	Established	Official name and notes
Abaeté Aviação		E4	ABJ	ABAETÉ	10,207 - January 6, 2023	1979	ATA-Aerotáxi Abaeté LTDA.
Aerosul Linhas Aéreas		2S	ASO		7,845 - April 20, 2022	2020	Aerosul Linhas Aéreas LTDA. Formerly Aerosul Táxi Aéreo and Austen Táxi Aéreo.
Apuí Táxi Aéreo		Q1	CQB	APUÍ	10,216 - January 9, 2023	1996	Apuí Táxi Aéreo S.A.
ASTA Linhas Aéreas		0A	SUL	ASTA	9,550 - October 19, 2022	1995	Asta Linhas Aéreas LTDA. Formerly América do Sul Linhas Aéreas LTDA.
Avion Express Brasil		Z3	AEB		16,474/SPO - February 27, 2025	2023	Avion Express Brasil LTDA.
Azul Linhas Aéreas		AD	AZU	AZUL	10,123 - December 23, 2022	2008	Azul Linhas Aéreas S.A.
Azul Conecta		2F (AD)	ACN	AZUL CONECTA	10,039 - December 14, 2022	2013	Azul Conecta LTDA. Subsidiary of Azul. Formerly Two Táxi Aéreo LTDA
GOL Linhas Aéreas		G3	GLO	GOL	12,669 - October 2, 2023	2000	GOL Linhas Aéreas S.A. Formerly VRG Linhas Aéreas S.A. and Gol Linhas Aéreas Inteligentes S.A.
LATAM Brasil		JJ (LA)	TAM	TAM	13,221 - November 24, 2023	1975	TAM Linhas Aéreas SA; Part of LATAM Airlines Group. Formerly Votec Serviços Aéreos Regionais, Brasil Central Linhas Aéreas, Transportes Aéreos Meridionais (TAM) and TAM Airlines
Sideral Linhas Aéreas		0S	SID	SIDERAL	8,905 - August 22, 2022	2010	Sideral Linhas Aéreas LTDA.
Total Linhas Aéreas		L1	TTL	TOTAL	9,934 - December 5, 2022	1988	Total Linhas Aéreas S.A. Suspended on September 1, 2026

== Cargo only ==
Airline	Image	IATA	ICAO	Callsign	AOC number	Established	Official name and notes
Braspress Air Cargo		BP	BPC	BRASPRESS	16,844 - April 22, 2025	2022	Braspress Air Cargo Transportes Aéreos LTDA.
LATAM Cargo Brasil		M3	LTG	TAMCARGO	9,429 - October 5, 2022	1995	ABSA Aerolinhas Brasileiras S.A. Part of LATAM Airlines Group. Former ABSA Cargo Airline and TAM Cargo
Modern Logistics		WD	MWM	MODERNAIR	9,933 - December 5, 2022	2015	Modern Transporte Aéreo de Carga S.A.
Total Express		TT	TOT	TOTAL EXPRESS	13,242 - November 28, 2023	2023	Anivia Linhas Aéreas LTDA.

== Non-regular only and air taxi ==
Airline	Image	IATA	ICAO	Callsign	AOC number	Established	Official name and notes
Amazonaves					9,913 - December 1, 2022	2008	Amazonaves Táxi Aéreo LTDA.
CTA					7,973 - May 9, 2022	1995	Cleiton Táxi Aéreo LTDA
Dugomes Air Táxi Aéreo					7,749 - April 6, 2022	2007	Dugomes Air Táxi Aéreo LTDA. Formerly Rio Acre Aerotáxi LTDA.
Dux Express				DUX EXPRESS	9,930 - December 2, 2022	2020	Dux Express Transportes Aéreos S.A. Formerly Apollo Express Táxi Aéreo S.A.
High Class Helicópteros					11,332 - May 16, 2023	—	High Class Táxi Aéreo LTDA.
JetBlack					11,464 - May 29, 2023	—	Jet Black Participações LTDA.
Líder Aviação					9,182 - September 15, 2022	1958	Líder Taxi Aéreo S.A. - Air Brasil
Manaus Aerotáxi					7,878 - April 27, 2022	1998	Manaus Aerotáxi Participações LTDA. Formerly Manaus Aerotáxi LTDA
OMNI Táxi Aéreo		O1	OMI	OMNI	9,544 - October 18, 2022	2000	OMNI Táxi Aéreo S.A.
PEC Aviation					9,581 - October 21, 2022	2004	PEC Táxi Aéreo LTDA.
Piquiatuba					9,824 - November 22, 2022	2005	Piquiatuba Táxi Aéreo LTDA.
Placar Linhas Aéreas		PL	PLS	PLACAR	17,665 - August 12, 2025	2022	Placar Linhas Aéreas S.A.
Prime Aviation					7,700 - March 31, 2022	—	Prime Aviation Táxi Aéreo e Serviços LTDA. Formerly Prime Táxi Air LTDA
RICO Táxi Aéreo					8,735 - August 2, 2022	1980	RICO Táxi Aéreo LTDA.
RIMA Táxi Aéreo		0R	RIM		7,455 - March 8, 2022	2001	Rio Madeira Aviação LTDA.
Soul Aviation	Soul Aviation Caravan 208B				14,705 - May 28, 2024	2020	Soul Aviation LTDA.

== See also ==
- List of defunct airlines of Brazil
- List of airlines of South America
- List of airlines
- Transportation in Brazil
