= Alcimar Leitão Airport =

Airport in Brazil

Alcimar Leitão Airport Aeroporto Alcimar Leitão
- IATA: none; ICAO: none

Summary
- Airport type: Defunct
- Serves: Feijó
- Elevation AMSL: 120 m (390 ft)
- Coordinates: 08°10′01″S 070°21′02″W

Map
- Location in Brazil

Runways
Direction	Length		Surface
Direction	ft	m	Surface
~~01/19~~	~~3,084~~	~~940~~	~~Asphalt~~ (closed)
- Largely demolished, no longer operational. Source: ANAC

Alcimar Leitão Airport, formerly (IATA: FEJ, ICAO: SWFJ), was the airport that served Feijó, Brazil until 2008, when the newer Feijó Airport was opened. The airport was later closed and became an urbanized area.

== Accidents and incidents ==
- 20 October 1968: a Cruzeiro do Sul Douglas C-47 A-25-DK registration PP-SAD had an engine failure and crashed after take-off and while trying to return to Feijó. All 19 passengers and crew died.

== Access ==
The airport was located 1 km (1 mi) from downtown Feijó.
