= Santarém-Maestro Wilson Fonseca Airport =

Santarém–Maestro Wilson Fonseca International Airport Aeroporto Internacional de Santarém–Maestro Wilson Fonseca
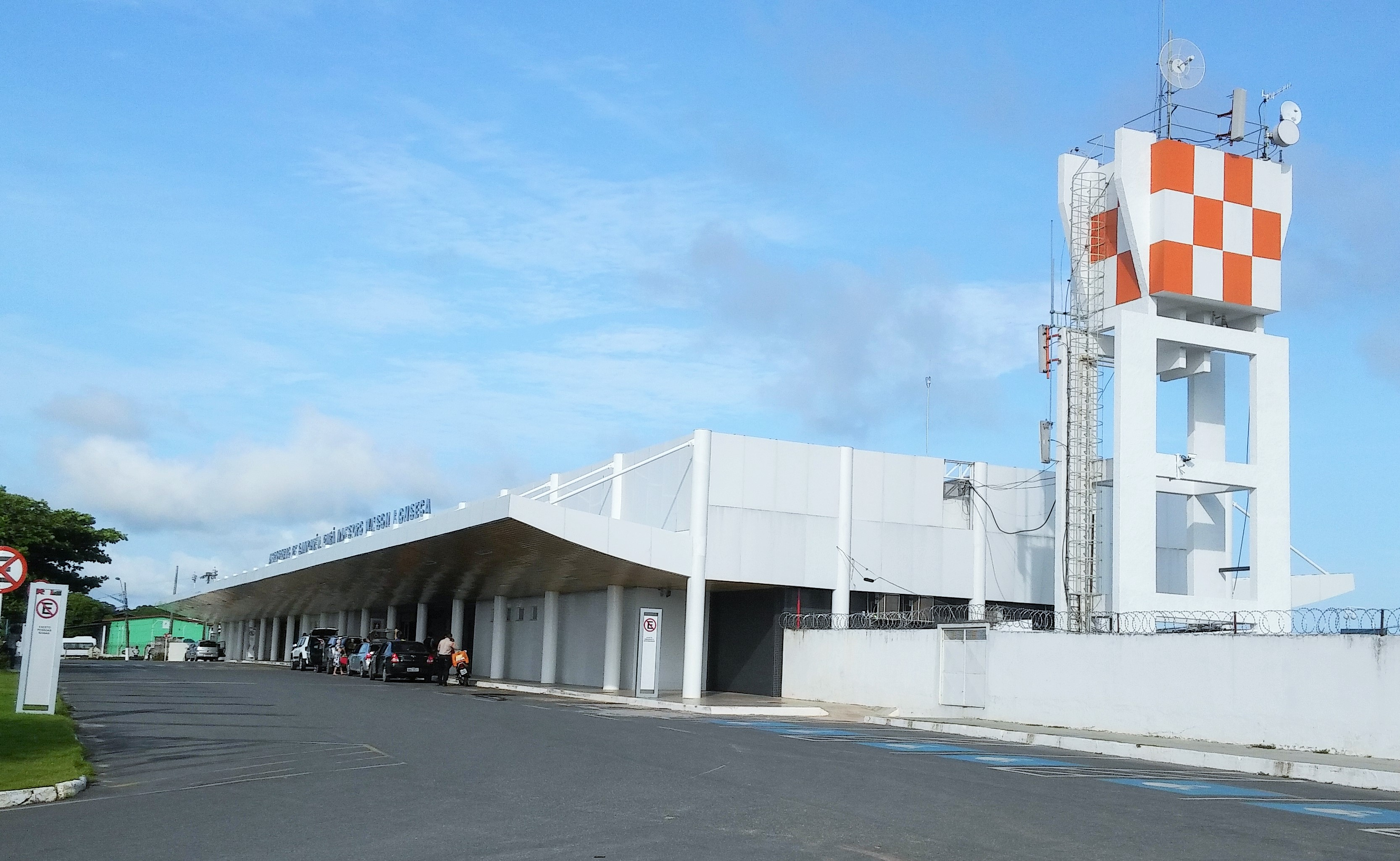
- Terminal landside
- IATA: STM; ICAO: SBSN; LID: PA0002

Summary
- Airport type: Public
- Operator: Infraero (1980–2022); AENA (2022–present)
- Serves: Santarém
- Opened: 31 March 1977; 49 years ago
- Time zone: BRT (UTC−03:00)
- Elevation AMSL: 60 m (200 ft)
- Coordinates: 02°25′29″S 054°47′09″W

Map
- Location in Brazil STM (Brazil)

Runways
| Direction | Length | | Surface |
| Direction | m | ft | Surface |
|---|---|---|---|
| 10/28 | 2,400 | 7,874 | Asphalt |

Statistics (2025)
- Passengers: 507,581 ▼3%
- Aircraft Operations: 9,544 ▼14%
- Metric tonnes of cargo: 1,990 ▼33%
- Statistics: AENA; Sources: ANAC, DECEA

Santarém–Maestro Wilson Fonseca International Airport (IATA: STM, ICAO: SBSN) is the airport serving Santarém, Brazil. It is named after the composer Wilson Dias da Fonseca (1912–2002), who was born in Santarém.

It is operated by AENA.

== History ==
Santarém-Maestro Wilson Fonseca Airport is currently the 5th busiest airport of northern region of Brazil and it is located half-way between Manaus and Belém, being an alternative for international flights. The airport was opened on March 31, 1977 and it was administrated by the Brazilian Air Force until it was transferred to Infraero in the early 1980s. It replaced another facility which was located in a district that is now called "Old Airport" (Portuguese: Aeroporto Velho), presently a highly populated residential district of the same name. The old runway was made into a large avenue with several squares and event venues.

Previously operated by Infraero, on August 18, 2022, the consortium AENA won a 30-year concession to operate the airport.

== Airlines and destinations ==
| Airlines | Destinations |
|---|---|
| Azul Brazilian Airlines | Belo Horizonte–Confins, Belém, Manaus, Porto Trombetas |
| Gol Linhas Aéreas | Belém, Manaus |
| LATAM Brasil | Brasília |

== Accidents and incidents ==
- 28 November 1995: a TABA Fairchild Hiller FH-227 registration PP-BUJ operating a cargo flight from Belém-Val de Cans to Santarém crashed on its second attempt to approach Santarém. A passenger occupied the co-pilot's seat. The crew of 2 and 1 of the 2 occupants died.
- 11 September 2008: a W&J Taxi Aéreo Embraer 711C Corisco registration PT-NNM operating a cargo flight from Alenquer to Santarém crashed 11 kilometers from the airport. The pilot declared emergency and ditched the aircraft into the Tapajós river after running out of fuel. Of the 3 people aboard 2 survived and were rescued by a small boat that was passing by. The body of one passenger was later found 800m from the site. The aircraft was salvaged and investigated.
- 29 September 2011: A Beechcraft BE35 Bonanza registration PT-AVK lost radio contact with the control tower after departing. Officials later learned the aircraft had crashed in a nearby community. The pilot and a passenger perished in the crash. The investigation revealed the aircraft suffered an inflight catastrophic structural failure of the tail section due to poor maintenance and corrosion.
- 7 September 2017: A Piquiatuba Táxi Aéreo Cessna 210 registration PT-KKK on a medevac flight to Piquiatuba (SNCJ), 16 km southeast of the airport. The airplane lost engine power and diverted to Santarém. Unable to reach the runway, the pilot decided to land the aircraft on a beach 4 km east of the runway. All 4 people on board survived. The investigation concluded the airplane did not have enough fuel for the flights it made, ultimately resulting in the crash due to fuel starvation to the engine. This accident resulted in Brazil's Aeronautical Accidents Investigation and Prevention Center (CENIPA) recommending the suspension of Piquiatuba Taxi Aéreo's license due to poor operational safety management.

== Access ==
The airport is located 15 km (9 mi) from downtown Santarém.

== Gallery ==
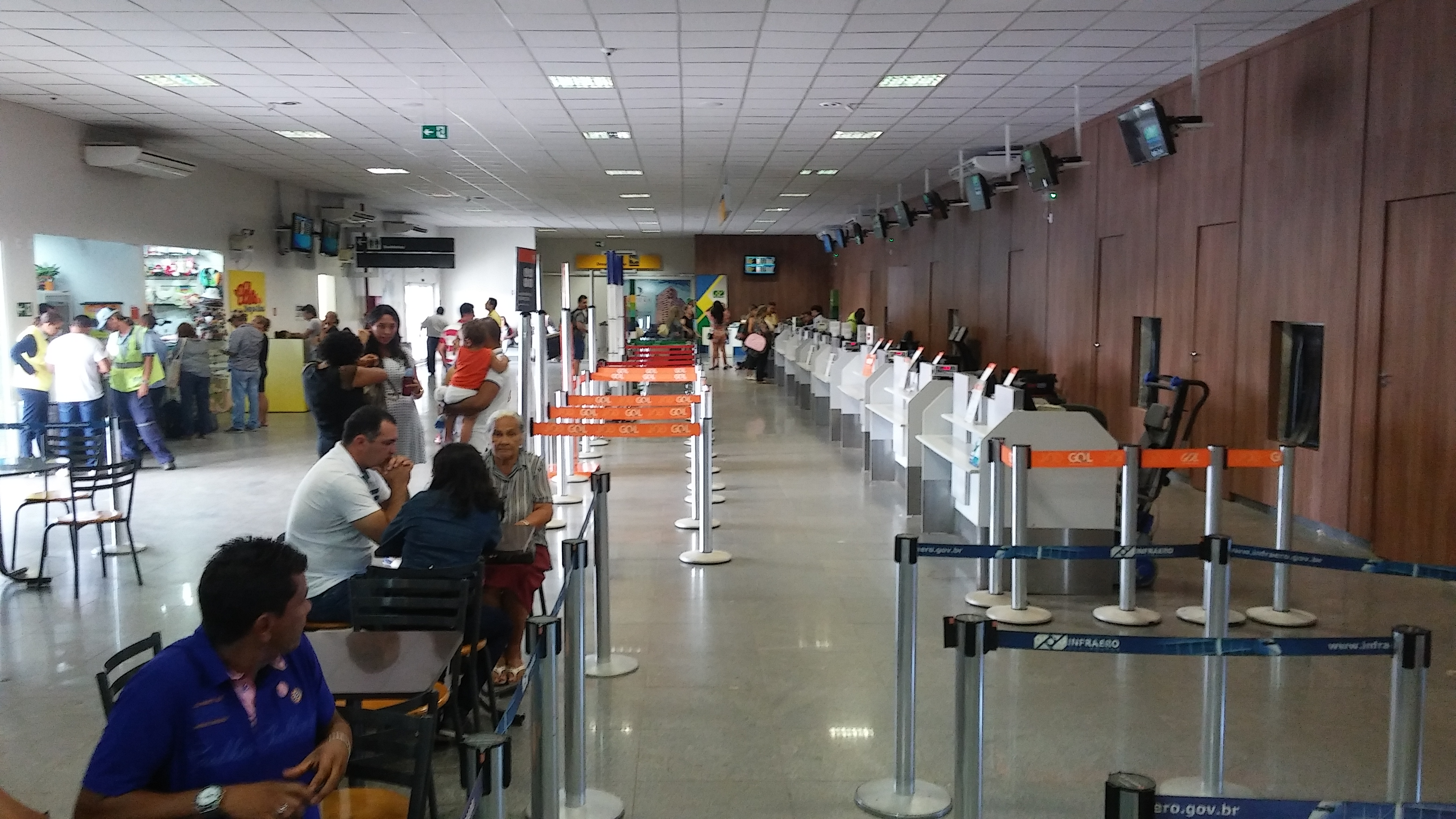

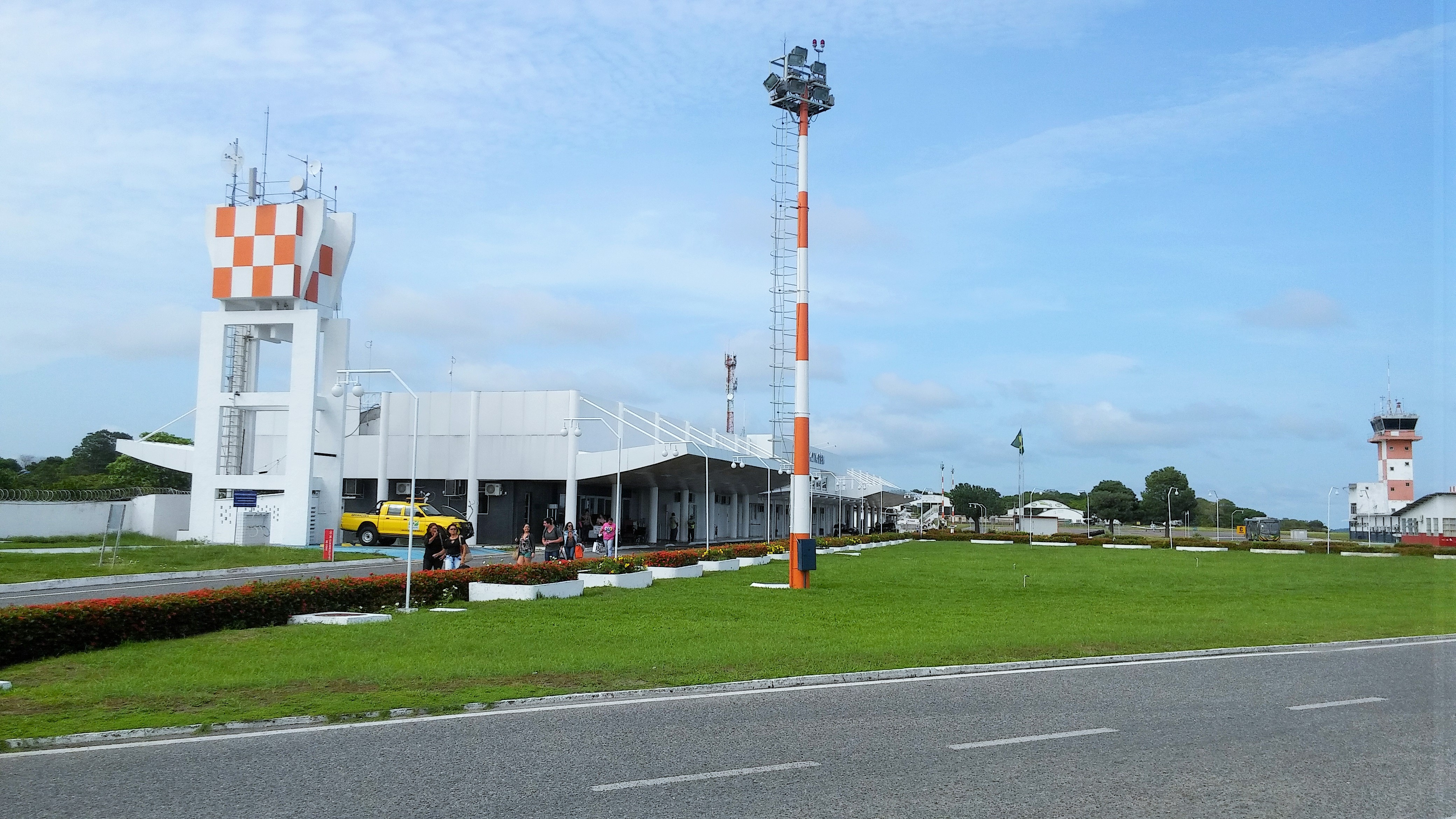

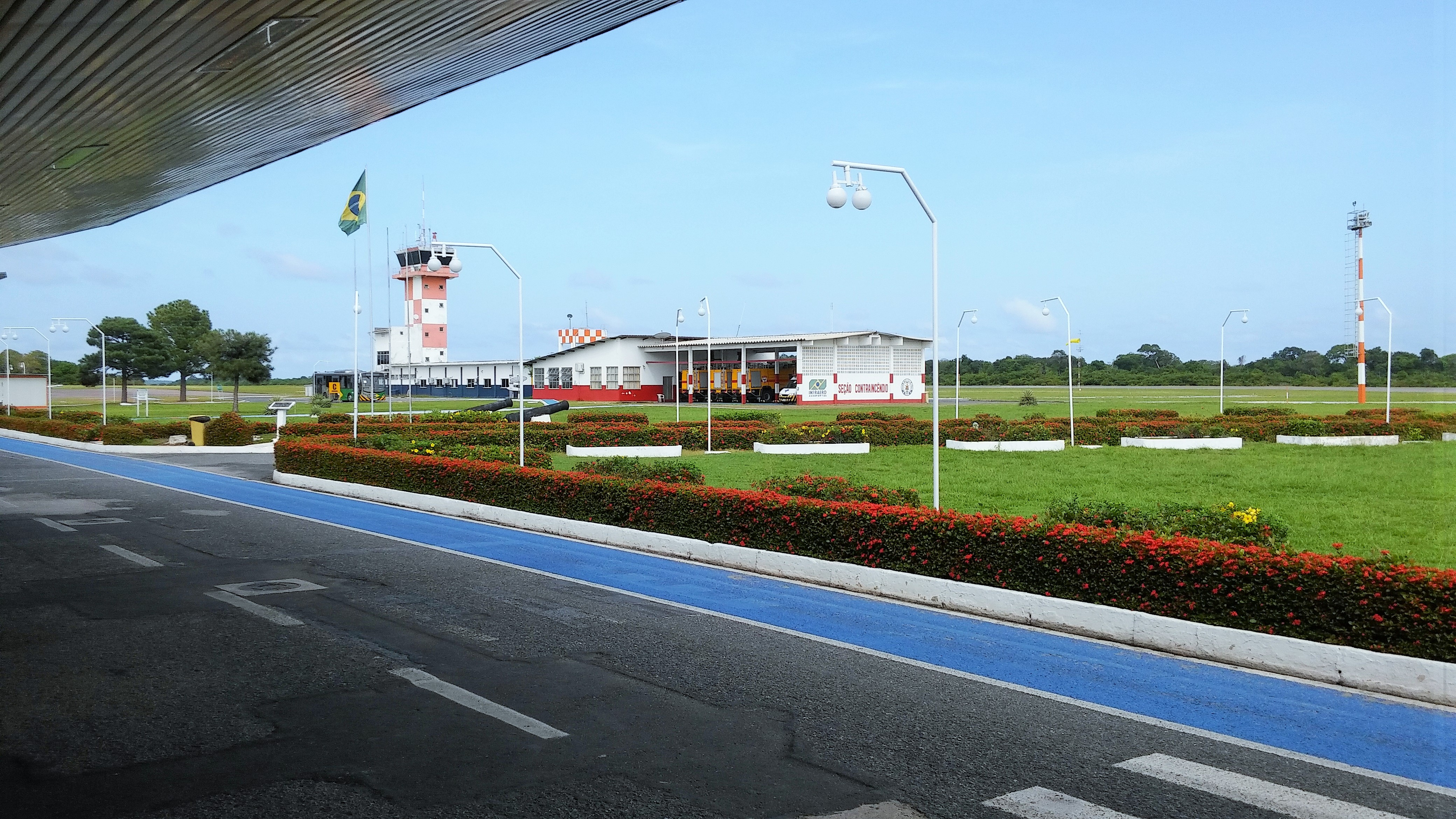

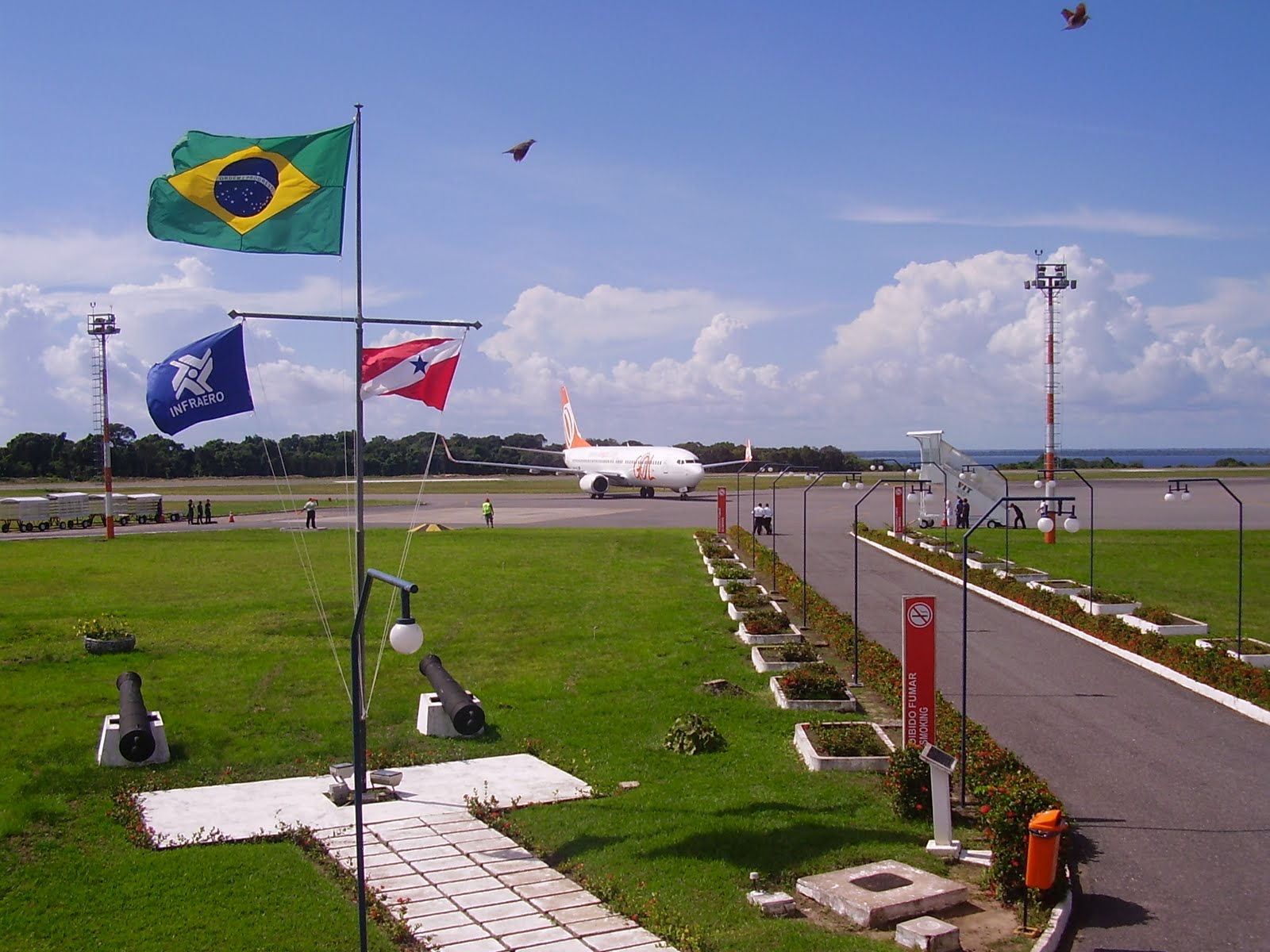

== See also ==
- List of airports in Brazil
