= CNPJ =

Brazilian national registry for legal entities

- A CNPJ from Apple Computer
- Subject: Legal entities
- Full name: Cadastro Nacional de Pessoas Jurídicas
- Organization: Federal Revenue of Brazil
- Introduced: 1998; 28 years ago
- No. of digits: 14
- Example: 00.623.904/0001-73

The Brazilian National Registry of Legal Entities (Portuguese: Cadastro Nacional de Pessoas Jurídicas, “CNPJ”) is a nationwide registry of corporations, partnerships, foundations, investment funds, and other legal entities, created and maintained by the Brazilian Federal Revenue Service (Receita Federal do Brasil, “RFB”). Currently, all companies are automatically enrolled in the system upon incorporation. The system uses a fourteen-digit number, which is made up of an eight-digit unique identifier, a four-digit branch identifier, and two check digits. The first number (even though it does not belong to the first company to be enrolled), 00.000.000/0001-91, has been assigned to Banco do Brasil, the country's largest public bank.

The CNPJ has become the most important number for commercial transactions between companies due to its ubiquity and official status. The RFB maintains a publicly accessible website where any CNPJ number can be checked; thus, for many purposes, it is now possible to discard all other non-essential information about a company and replace it with the CNPJ number. This is true, for instance, of product labels: instead of including the full name and address of the company manufacturing or selling a product, merchants include only the CNPJ, which can be easily found online and checked against the RFB's official database.

The Federal Government, interested in simplifying its registration procedures on companies appears in the mid-90's, but it was only in 1998, through the SRF Normative Instruction No. 27, that the CNPJ (short for Cadastro Nacional da Pessoa Jurídica in Portuguese, or 'National Registry of Legal Entities') was created, replacing the former system, CGC (short for Cadastro Geral de Contribuintes in Portuguese, or 'General Taxpayers Registry'). At the end of 2003 it gained a new impulse by sharing and integrating registration data and fiscal information between States and the Union. In 2009 the MEI (Microempreendedor Individual in Portuguese, or 'Individual Microentrepreneur') was created to supply market demand. The CNPJ consists of a 14-digit number formatted as XX.XXX.XXX/0001-XX — The first eight digits identify the company, the four digits after the slash identify the branch or subsidiary ("0001" defaults to the headquarters), and the last two are check digits.

The CNPJ must be informed on any invoice of any company, as well as on the packaging of any industrialized product.

According to SEBRAE (Serviço Brasileiro de Apoio às Micro e Pequenas Empresas in Portuguese, or 'Brazilian Service to Support Micro and Small Enterprises'), there are more than 19.2 million active companies in Brazil, almost 6 million situated in São Paulo --, more than 4.8 million being 'Individual Microentrepreneur' (MEI), 'Micro-enterprise' (Microempresas - ME) and/or 'Small Business' (Empresas de Pequeno Porte - EPP).

- Services - 8.641,860
- Trade - 6.612,605
- Industry - 1.908,250
- Civil Construction - 1.367,636
- Agriculture - 697.674

Data from IBGE (Instituto Brasileiro de Geografia e Estatística in Portuguese, or 'Brazilian Institute of Geography and Statistics') shows 4.937,861 million companies in 2018, an increase of 11.7% compared to 2007, but represents a drop of 1.8%, if compared to 2017.

Among the more than 52.2 million employed persons, 45.5 million (87.0%) were salary workers and 6.8 million (13.0%) were in the condition of partner or ownership. The average monthly salary was R$2.952,87, equivalent to 3.1 minimum wages.

Also according to the IBGE, of the companies founded in the country in 2008, only 25.3% were still standing in 2018, 70% closed their doors in less than 10 years and only 25.3% were still standing ten years later. The CEMPRE (Cadastro Central de Empresas in Portuguese, or 'Central Business Register') is currently composed of approximately 29.3 million companies and other formal organizations and 31.4 million local units (operational addresses), of which 91.5% are business entities and the 8.5% remaining distributed between public administration bodies and non-profit entities.

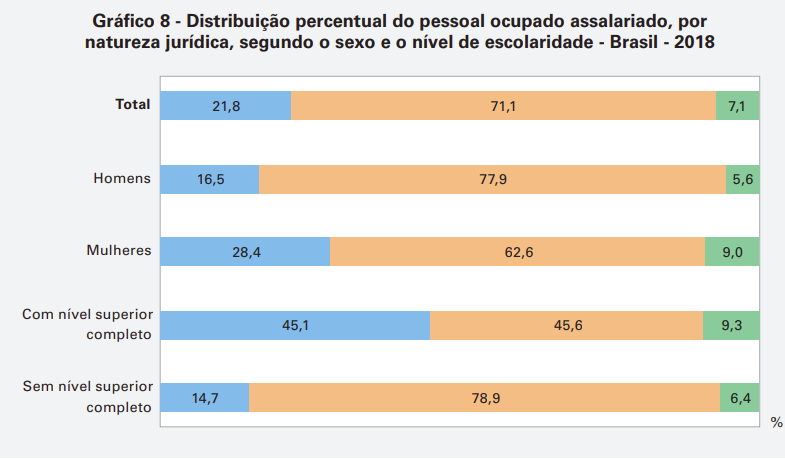
Distribution of salary workers, according to their legal nature, by gender and level of education in 2018

Graphic chart shows the distribution of salary workers, according to their legal nature, by gender and level of education in 2018: 71.1% were absorbed by business entities; 21.8% by the public administration; and 7.1% by non-profit entities.

Different cases of CNPJ-related frauds are recorded every year in Brazil. The most common types are:

- A fake entity cloning a regular entity's CNPJ to use it in banking transactions or when applying for credit.
- A fake website is designed, similar to the original website, using the same information as the regular entity but failing to provide the service.

Consulting a CNPJ is free, and can be done directly through the Federal Revenue system. The service is called "Emissão de Comprovante de Inscrição e de Situação Cadastral"

== See also ==
- Cadastro de Pessoas Físicas (CPF), the Brazilian National Registry of Natural Persons.
- Microempreendedor individual (MEI), the Brazilian Small Business system.
- Instituto Brasileiro de Geografia e Estatística (IBGE), the Brazilian CENSUS.
