= Apucarana Airport =

Captain João Busse Airport Aeroporto Capitão João Busse
- IATA: APU; ICAO: SSAP; LID: PR0014

Summary
- Airport type: Public
- Operator: Apucarana; SEIL
- Serves: Apucarana
- Time zone: BRT (UTC−03:00)
- Elevation AMSL: 800 m (2,600 ft)
- Coordinates: 23°36′44″S 051°23′06″W

Map
- Location in Brazil APU (Brazil)

Runways
Direction	Length		Surface
Direction	m	ft	Surface
10/28	1,400	4,593	Asphalt

Statistics (2011)
- Passengers: 701 ▲5%
- Aircraft Operations: 430 ▼11%
- Statistics: SEIL; Sources: ANAC, DECEA

Capitão João Busse Airport (IATA: APU, ICAO: SSAP) is the airport serving Apucarana, Brazil. It is named after Captain João Alexandre Busse (1886-1921), the first aviator born in the state of Paraná.

It is operated by the Municipality of Apucarana under the supervision of Aeroportos do Paraná (SEIL).

== Accidents and incidents ==
- 26 January 2007: a Líder Táxi Aéreo Raytheon 400A registration PR-MMS started the takeoff race and shortly after leaving the ground, there was a collision, apparently, with the landing gear, against a cameraman positioned in the center of the runway, who died instantly. The aircraft continued its flight to São Paulo–Congonhas.

== Access ==
The airport is located 9 km (6 mi) southeast from downtown Apucarana.

== See also ==
- List of airports in Brazil
