= Receita Federal do Brasil =

Government agency responsible for administering federal taxes

Special Department of Federal Revenue of Brazil Secretaria Especial da Receita Federal do Brasil
- Logo
- Common name: Receita Federal
- Abbreviation: RFB

Agency overview
- Formed: 20 November 1968; 57 years ago

Jurisdictional structure
- Federal agency: Brazil
- Operations jurisdiction: Brazil
- General nature: Federal law enforcement
- Specialist jurisdictions: Customs, excise, gambling; Taxation

Operational structure
- Headquarters: Brasília, Federal District, Brazil
- Agency executive: Robinson Sakiyama Barreirinhas, Secretary
- Parent agency: Ministry of Finance

Website
- www.gov.br/receitafederal/

The Special Department of Federal Revenue of Brazil (Portuguese: Secretaria Especial da Receita Federal do Brasil), most commonly referred to as Receita Federal (RFB), is the Brazilian federal revenue service agency and a secretariat of the Ministry of the Economy. The bureau has the role of administering tax collection and the customs of Brazil. It also controls tax noncompliance, smuggling, piracy and drug trafficking.

Until January 1, 2019, it was subordinated to the Ministry of Finance and, from then on, it became part of the basic structure of the new Ministry of Economy of the Jair Bolsonaro Government.

From January 1, 2023, it was again subordinated to the Ministry of Finance, with the return of the portfolio in the Lula Government.
