= Feijó, Acre =

Municipality in Brazil

Feijó
- Municipality
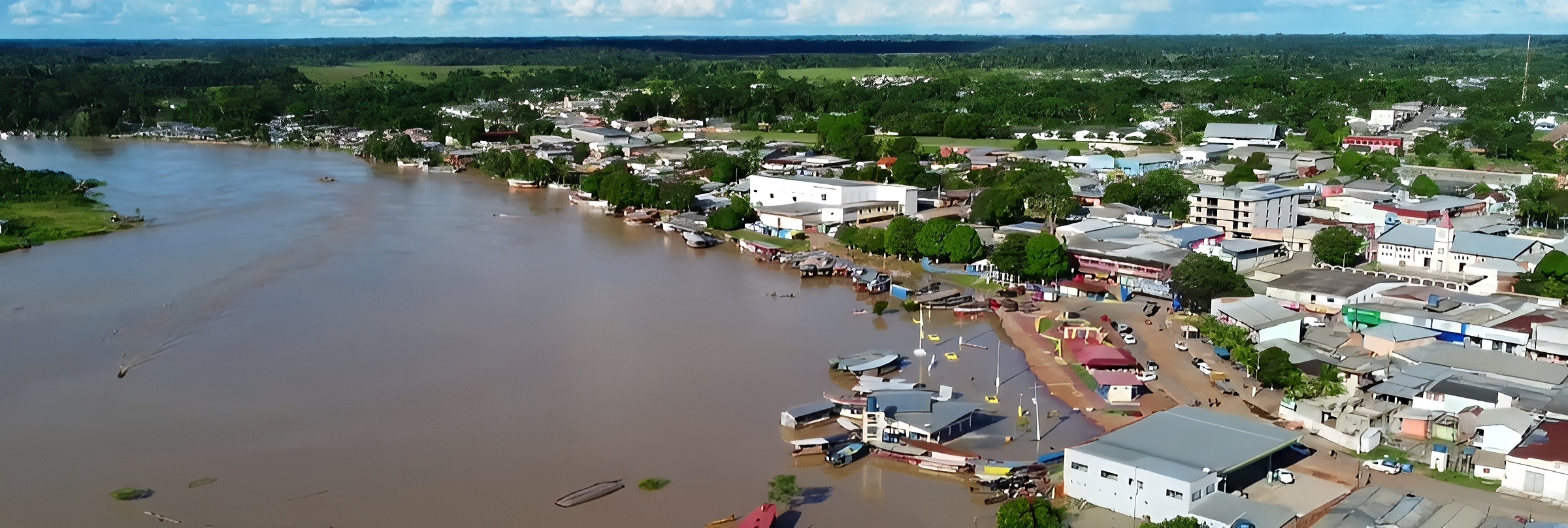
- Feijó, Brazil

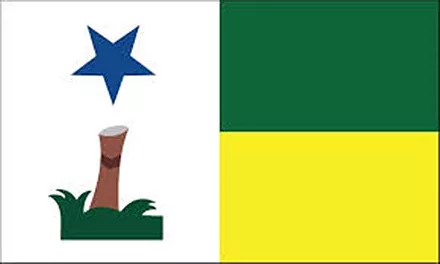
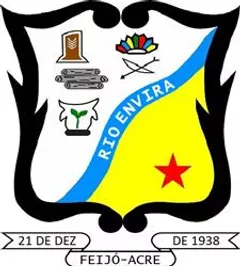
- Flag Coat of arms

- Location of municipality in Acre State

- Location in Brazil
- Coordinates: 8°9′50″S 70°21′14″W
- Country: Brazil
- State: Acre

Government
  - Mayor: Kiefer Roberto Cavalcante Lima (PP)

Area
  - Total: 9,344 sq mi (24,202 km^{2})

Population (2022)
  - Total: 35,426
  - Density: 3.7911/sq mi (1.4638/km^{2})
- Time zone: UTC−5 (ACT)

Feijó (Brazilian Portuguese pronunciation: [fejˈʒɔ]) is a municipality located in the center of the Brazilian state of Acre. As of 2022, its population was 35,426. The total land area is 24,202 km^{2}.

The city is served by Feijó Airport.

The municipality contains 231,555-hectare (572,180-acre) of Santa Rosa do Purus National Forest, a sustainable use conservation unit created in 2001.
