= Feijó Airport =

Airport in Brazil

Feijó Airport Aeroporto de Feijó
- IATA: FEJ; ICAO: SNOU; LID: AC0003

Summary
- Airport type: Private
- Operator: Deracre
- Serves: Feijó
- Time zone: BRT−2 (UTC−05:00)
- Elevation AMSL: 168 m (551 ft)
- Coordinates: 08°08′29″S 070°20′27″W

Map
- Location in Brazil

Runways
Direction	Length		Surface
Direction	m	ft	Surface
03/21	1,150	3,773	Asphalt
- Source: ANAC, DECEA

Feijó Airport (IATA: FEJ, ICAO: SNOU) is the main private airport serving Feijó, Brazil.

It is operated by Deracre (Department of Roads, Hidro and Air Infrastructure of the State of Acre).

== History ==
The airport was built as a replacement to Alcimar Leitão Airport (ICAO code SWFJ), which was located closer to the city center. The new airport was opened in 2008 when the old facility was closed.

== Access ==
The airport is located 4 km (2 mi) from downtown Feijó.

== See also ==
- List of airports in Brazil
