= Non-scheduled airline =

Variety of air transport provider

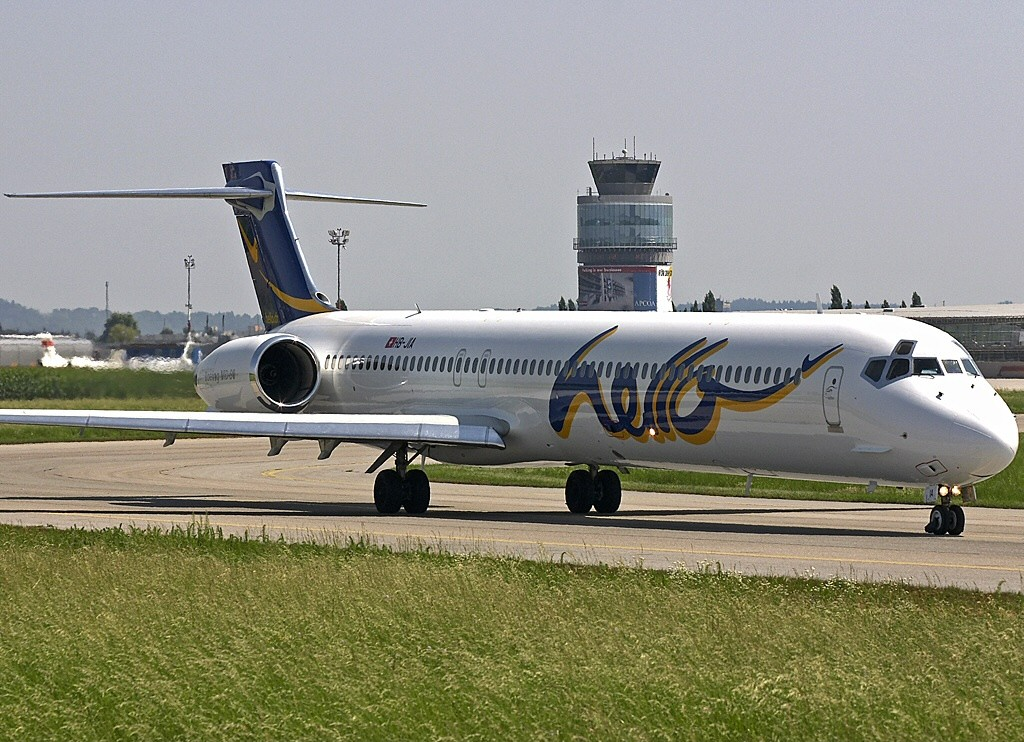
MD-90 of defunct "Hello AG", a non-scheduled Swiss airline.

A non-scheduled airline is a company that offers unscheduled air transport services of passengers or goods at an hourly or per mile / kilometer charge for chartering the entire aircraft along with crew. A non-scheduled airline may hold domestic or international licences, or both, and operates under the regulations prescribed by its national civil aviation authority.

== See also ==
- Airline
- History of non-scheduled airlines in the United States
