= Aerovias Brasil =

Brazilian airline

- Founded: 1942
- Ceased operations: 1961
- Parent company: TACA until 1947
- Headquarters: São Paulo, Brazil
- Key people: Roberto Taves; Linneu Gomes

Empresa de Transportes Aéreos Aerovias Brasil S/A was a Brazilian airline founded in 1942. It was merged into Varig in 1961, when Varig bought the Consórcio Real-Aerovias-Nacional, of which Aerovias Brasil was one of the partners.

== History ==
Aerovias Brasil was founded on August 26, 1942, as part of an ambitious project of TACA Airlines: the creation of one national airline in each Latin American country. Therefore, two of the shareholders of Taca had 66.6% of the shares whereas 33.4% belonged to 29 Brazilian share-holders being the brothers Oscar and Roberto Taves the most important. Later, the brothers would leave the society and Roberto Taves would be one of the start-up shareholders of Lóide Aéreo Nacional. Its operations were authorized on December 29, 1942, and flights started the following year.

In its first years, Aerovias Brasil operated passenger flights within Brazil, and particularly during World War II, non-regular cargo flights to the United States. Because of reciprocal rights in bi-lateral agreements between Brazil and the United States, two airlines of each country could operate between them. In Brazil, Aerovias Brasil and Cruzeiro do Sul were the ones that had traffic rights granted. Aerovias Brasil was thus able to transform its non-scheduled flights to the United States in scheduled and could also include passenger transportation. Flights started in 1946 and Aerovias Brasil was the first Brazilian airline to establish those regular passenger flights. The twice-weekly flight from Rio de Janeiro-Santos Dumont to Miami lasted more than 48 hours and was operated with a Douglas DC-3. It stopped in Anápolis, Carolina, Belém, Paramaribo-Zanderij, Port of Spain, La Guaira (Caracas), and Santo Domingo (then Ciudad Trujillo). Since the flight operated only during daylight, from Rio de Janeiro to Miami, overnight stops were made in Belém and Ciudad Trujillo. From Miami to Rio de Janeiro, the overnight stops were in Port of Spain and Belém.

In 1947, Aerovias Brasil was flying to all main cities on the Brazilian coast, from Porto Alegre to Belém. In the same year, the participation of shares in the hands of Brazilian citizens grew to 91% and another route to Belém, this time flying on a straight line via Goiânia, Porto Nacional, and Carolina was opened. This inland route complemented the coastal one.

On February 17, 1949, Aerovias Brasil was bought by the State of São Paulo. The new administrator implemented an extensive reorganization.

In 1951, Aerovias Brasil bought four Douglas DC-4s to start flights to Buenos Aires and Montevideo. On January 15, 1953, Aerovias Brasil bought Aeronorte and increased its presence in the north and northeast regions of Brazil. Aeronorte, however, continued to operate as an autonomous unit in partnership with its new owner.

In 1954, it was sold again to the private initiative, this time to a financial conglomerate owned by Adhemar de Barros, former governor of São Paulo. Adhemar de Barros in turn sold 87% of the shares to Linneu Gomes, owner of Real Transportes Aéreos. With this purchase, Real gained the prestige, experience and influence that it lacked.

With the later acquisition of Transportes Aéreos Nacional in 1956 also by Linneu Gomes, a consortium was formed. It took the name of Consórcio Real-Aerovias-Nacional and it was able to fly on the entire Brazilian territory and international destinations formerly served by Aerovias Brasil. Though maintaining legal independent identities, because they were controlled by the same person, Linneu Gomes, the three airlines operated jointly and in practice it was Real which controlled the consortium. In its time, the consortium dominated the passenger traffic on the triangle São Paulo, Rio de Janeiro, Belo Horizonte, the economic center of the country.

In 1961 Varig bought a participation in Aerovias Brasil and later the same year, it bought the whole consortium Real-Aerovias-Nacional. Aerovias Brasil and its sister companies were merged into Varig.

Aerovias Brasil, still as a part of the consortium Real-Aerovias-Nacional, bought three Convair CV-990A to operate on its intercontinental routes shortly before the consortium was sold to Varig. Varig tried to cancel the order but was unable to do so. Therefore, against its will, Varig had to receive and operate those three aircraft.

== Destinations ==
As of May 1950, Aerovias Brasil served the following Brazilian and international destinations:

- Brazil
  - Anápolis
  - Aracaju – Santa Maria Airport
  - Araguari
  - Belém – Val de Cães International Airport
  - Belo Horizonte – Pampulha Airport
  - Bom Jesus da Lapa – Bom Jesus da Lapa Airport
  - Carolina – Carolina Airport
  - Curitiba – Afonso Pena International Airport
  - Fortaleza – Pinto Martins International Airport
  - Goiânia – Santa Genoveva Airport
  - Ilhéus – Jorge Amado Airport
  - Ipatinga (Acesita) – Usiminas Airport
  - Londrina – Gov. José Richa Airport
  - Maceió – Zumbi dos Palmares International Airport
  - Oliveira
  - Parnaíba – Prefeito Dr. João Silva Filho International Airport
  - Paulo Afonso – Paulo Afonso Airport
  - Petrolina – Sen. Nilo Coelho Airport
  - Poços de Caldas – Poços de Caldas Airport
  - Porto Alegre – Salgado Filho International Airport
  - Porto Nacional – Porto Nacional Airport
  - Recife – Guararapes/Gilberto Freyre International Airport
  - Rio de Janeiro – Santos Dumont Airport
  - Salvador da Bahia – Deputado Luís Eduardo Magalhães International Airport (2 de Julho)
  - São Luís – Marechal Cunha Machado International Airport (Tirirical)
  - São Paulo – Congonhas Airport
  - Teresina – Teresina Airport
  - Uberlândia – Uberlândia Airport
- Dominican Republic
  - Santo Domingo (Ciudad Trujillo) – Las Américas International Airport
- Suriname (then known as Dutch Guyana)
  - Paramaribo – Johan Adolf Pengel International Airport (Zanderij)
- Trinidad and Tobago (then a UK Crown Colony)
  - Port of Spain – Piarco International Airport
- United States
  - Miami – Miami International Airport
- Venezuela
  - Caracas (La Guaira) – Simon Bolivar International Airport (Maiquetía)

== Fleet ==
Aerovias Brasil fleet
Aircraft	Total	Years of operation	Notes
Lockheed 14H2	2	1942–1945	
Fairchild 71A	2	1944–1945	
Lockheed 12A	2	1944–1947	
Douglas DC-2	2	1945–1948	
Douglas DC-3/C-47	30	1945–1961	
Curtiss C-46 Commando	4	1951–1954	
Douglas DC-4	4	1951–1960	

== Accidents and incidents ==
Accidents involving fatalities

- 15 February 1943: a Lockheed 14H2 registration PP-AVA doing a cargo flight crashed near Bom Jesus da Lapa. One crew member died.
- 14 July 1948: a Douglas C-47A-70-DL registration PP-AVO doing a cargo flight, crashed and caught fire after taking-off from Belém-Val de Cans. All 5 passengers and crew died.
- 19 December 1949: a Douglas C-47A-30-DK Dakota III registration PP-AXG, disappeared when on a training flight after taking-off from Vitória. It probably crashed at sea. All 6 passengers and crew died.
- 31 May 1950: a Douglas C-47-DL registration PP-AVZ, en route from Vitória to Salvador disintegrated on air, while flying over Itacaré, near Ilhéus. It was flying under extremely bad conditions and entered a cumulus nimbus. Passengers and cargo were moved aboard and as a consequence control was lost. Both wings separated from the aircraft as it descended at great speed. Of the 13 passengers and crew aboard, 2 survived.
- 14 October 1952: a Douglas C-47-DL registration PP-AXJ operated by Real Transportes Aéreos en route from São Paulo-Congonhas to Porto Alegre struck high ground while flying under adverse conditions over the location of São Francisco de Paula. Of the 18 passengers and crew aboard, 14 died.
- 6 September 1961: a Douglas C-47-DL registration PP-AVL operated by Real Transportes Aéreos while on visual approach under adverse conditions to Concórdia crashed into a hill 1,500m short of the runway. Three crew members died.

== See also ==
- Real Transportes Aéreos, a partner of the consortium Real-Aerovias-Nacional
- Transportes Aéreos Nacional, a partner of the consortium Real-Aerovias-Nacional
- List of defunct airlines of Brazil
