= List of defunct airlines of Brazil =

This is a list of defunct airlines of Brazil.

Airline	Image	IATA	ICAO	Callsign	Commenced operations	Ceased operations	Notes
Abaeté Linhas Aéreas			ABJ		1994	2012	AOC revoked
Aero Amazonas Linhas Aereas					1996	1996	
AeroBrasil Cargo					1998	2000	Cargo branch of Transbrasil. Bankrupt
Aero Geral					1941	1952	Sold to Varig
Aerolloyd Iguassu					1933	1939	Sold to VASP
Aeronorte					1940	1961	Sold to Aerovias Brasil and later integrated into Varig
Aerovias Brasil			BSL		1942	1961	Sold to Varig
Aerovias Minas Gerais					1944	1949	Bankrupt
Air Brasil Linhas Aéreas							
Air Brasil Cargo			BSL		2006	2012	
Air Minas Linhas Aéreas		6M	AMG	AIR MINAS	2002	2010	AOC revoked
Air Vias			AIV		1993	1995	
Asas Linhas Aéreas		CEU	ASAS AIR		2020	2020	Asas Linhas Aéreas LTDA. Never flown carrying cargo, aircraft abandoned at BSB
ATA Brasil			ABZ	ATA BRASIL	2002	2005	
Atlântico Linhas Aéreas					1995	1996	
Avianca Brasil		O6	ONE	OCEAN AIR	1998	2019	Formerly Oceanair. Bankrupt
BETA Cargo		GB	BET	BETA	1990	2012	Formerly Brasair Transportes Aéreos. AOC revoked
Brasair							Operated a B707-300F in Manaus
BRA Transportes Aéreos		B7	BRB	BRA-TRANSPAEREOS	1999	2007	Formerly Brasil Rodo Aéreo. Bankrupt
Brasmex – Brasil Minas Express			BCA	BRASMEX	2001	2004	
Brava Linhas Aéreas		N7	NHG	HELGA	2006	2013	Formerly NHT Linhas Aéreas. AOC revoked
Central Aérea Limitada					1948	1955	Sold to Transportes Aéreos Nacional
COLT Cargo			XCA	COLT	2013	2017	
Companhia Itaú de Transportes Aéreos					1947	1956	Sold to Transportes Aéreos Nacional
Companhia Meridional de Transportes					1944	1946	Bankrupt
Condor Syndikat					1924	1927	Succeeded by Syndicato Condor^{a}
Connect Cargo					2019	2020	
Cruiser Linhas Aéreas		J6	VCR	VOE CRUISER	2001	2010	AOC revoked
Cruzeiro do Sul		SC	CRZ	CRUZEIRO	1943	1993	Sold to and later integrated into Varig
Digex Aero Cargo			DGX	DIGEX	1990	1997	
Empresa de Transporte Aéreo					1928	1929	
Flex Linhas Aéreas		JH	FFX	FLEX BRASIL	2007	2010	Formerly Nordeste Linhas Aéreas Regionais. Bankrupt
Fly Brasil Transportes Aéreos					1999	2002	
Fly Linhas Aéreas		4H	FLB	AEREAFLY	1995	2003	
Flyways Linhas Aéreas			FYW		2014	2018	AOC revoked
Helisul Linhas Aéreas					1994	1998	Sold to TAM-Transportes Aéreos Meridionais
Interbrasil STAR		Q9	ITB	INTERBRASIL	1994	2001	Regional branch of Transbrasil. Bankrupt
Interexpress Transportes Aéreos Regionais		K9	IPM	INTEREXPRESS	1996	1998	Passenger division of Itapemirim. Sold to TAM-Transportes Aéreos Meridionais
Itapemirim Transportes Aéreos		5W	IPM	ITAPEMIRIM	1990	2000	Cargo division of Itapemirim.
ITA Transportes Aéreos		8I	IPM	AEROITA	2020	2021	Bankrupt
Levu Air Cargo			LVU	LVU CARGO	2024	2025	Levu Transporte Aéreo e Logística de Cargas S.A.
Linhas Aéreas Brasileiras					1945	1948	
Linha Aérea Transcontinental Brasileira					1944	1951	Sold to Real Transportes Aéreos
Linhas Aéreas Natal					1946	1950	Sold to Real Transportes Aéreos
Linhas Aéreas Paulistas – LAP					1943	1951	Sold to Lóide Aéreo Nacional
Linhas Aéreas Wright					1947	1948	Sold to Real Transportes Aéreos
Litorânea				LITORANEA	2007	2009	
Lóide Aéreo Nacional					1947	1962	Formerly Transportes Carga Aérea. Sold to VASP
Mais Linhas Aéreas			MLI	DEMAIS	2010	2013	
MAP Linhas Aéreas		7M	PAM	MAP AIR	2011	2025	Bankrupt
Master Top Airlines MTA		Q4	MST	MASTER	2006	2011	Bankrupt
Meta Linhas Aéreas			MSQ	META	1997	2011	Formerly META - Mesquita Transportes Aéreos.
Montini Air							A unique DC8 flown for a short time in Viracopos carrying cargo.
NAB – Navegação Aérea Brasileira					1938	1961	Sold to Lóide Aéreo Nacional
Nacional Transportes Aéreos			NCT		2000	2002	
Noar Linhas Aéreas			NRA	NOAR	2009	2011	AOC revoked
Nordeste Linhas Aéreas Regionais		JH	NES	NORDESTE	1976	2007	Sold to and later integrated into Varig. Rebranded as Flex Linhas Aéreas
NYRBA do Brasil					1929	1930	Rebranded Panair do Brasil
Organização Mineira de Transportes Aéreos					1946	1957	Sold to Transportes Aéreos Nacional
Panair do Brasil		PB	PAB	BANDEIRANTE	1930	1965	Bankrupt
Pantanal Linhas Aéreas		GP; P8	PTN	PANTANAL	1990	2013	Sold to TAM Airlines
Paraense Transportes Aéreos		QR			1952	1970	
Penta Transportes Aéreos		5P	PEP	AEROPENA	1995	2005	
Phoenix Airlines			PHN	PHOENIX BRASIL	1995	1997	
Presidente Transportes Aéreos				PRESIDENTE	1996	2001	
Promodal Transportes Aéreos			GPT	PROMODAL	2003	2004	
Puma Air		Z4	PLY	PUMA BRASIL	2002	2011	
Real Transportes Aéreos		RL		REAL	1945	1961	Sold to Varig
Rico Linhas Aéreas		C7	RLE	RICO	1996	2010	AOC revoked
Rio Linhas Aéreas		RL	RIO	RIO LINHAS	2007	2017	Formerly JetSul.
Rio Sul Serviços Aéreos Regionais		SL	RSL	RIO SUL	1976	2002	Sold to and later integrated into Varig
Sadia Transportes Aéreos		QD		SADIA	1955	1972	Rebranded as Transbrasil
SAVA Cargo		TD	TNS	SAVA	1978	1999	
SAVAG				SAVAG	1946	1966	Sold to Cruzeiro do Sul
Serviços Aéreos Condor				CONDOR	1927	1943	Formerly Syndicato Condor. Nationalized and rebranded as Cruzeiro do Sul
SETE Linhas Aéreas		5O	SLX	SETE	1999	2017	
Skyjet Brazil				SKYJET	1996	1996	
Skymaster Airlines			SKC	SKYMASTER AIR	1995	2010	
Sol Linhas Aéreas			SBA	SOL	2008	2012	
Sterna Linhas Aéreas			STR	STERNA	2014	2017	
Transportes Aéreos Bandeirantes					1945	1950	Sold to Lóide Aéreo Nacional
TABA – Transportes Aéreos da Bacia Amazônica		T2	TAB	TABA	1976	1999	
TAC – Transportes Aéreos Catarinense					1947	1966	Formerly Transportes Aéreos Ltda. Sold to Sadia Transportes Aéreos
TAF Linhas Aéreas		R9	TSD	TAFI	1995	2009	AOC revoked
TAM – Transportes Aéreos Regionais		KK			1976	2000	Integrated into TAM-Transportes Aéreos Meridionais to form TAM Airlines
TAS – Transportes Aéreos Salvador					1949	1962	Sold to Sadia Transportes Aéreos
Tavaj Linhas Aéreas		4U	TVJ	TAVAJ	1994	2004	
TEAM Linhas Aéreas			TIM	TEAM BRASIL	2001	2012	AOC revoked
Transbrasil		TR	TBA	TRANSBRASIL	1972	2001	Formerly Sadia Transportes Aéreos. Bankrupt
Transportes Aéreos Nacional					1946	1961	Sold to Varig
Transportes Aéreos Sul-Americanos					1948	1949	
Transportes Charter do Brasil			TCJ	Charter Brasil	1994	2006	
TRIP Linhas Aéreas		T4	TIB	TRIP	1998	2014	Sold to Azul Brazilian Airlines
Unex Airlines			UNX		1997	1999	
Universal Transportes Aéreos					1947	1948	
Varig		RG	VRG	VARIG	1927	2006	Bankrupt. Assets split between Flex Linhas Aéreas and Gol Transportes Aéreos.
Varig Log		LC	VLO	VELOG	2000	2012	Cargo branch of Varig. Bankrupt
VASD					1944	1952	Sold to Transportes Aéreos Nacional
VASP		VP	VSP	VASP	1933	2005	Bankrupt
VASPEX		VP	VSP	VASP	1996	2005	Cargo branch of VASP. Bankrupt
Via Brasil Linhas Aéreas			VBR		1999	2002	
Viabras					1946	1953	Sold to Transportes Aéreos Nacional
Viação Aérea Arco-Íris					1945	1948	
Viação Aérea Bahiana					1945	1948	
Viação Charter Aérea					1998	1998	
Voe Minas Gerais					2016	2019	
Voepass Linhas Aéreas		2Z	PTB	PASSAREDO	1995; 2023	2025	Passaredo Transportes Aéreos S.A. Formerly Passaredo Linhas Aéreas
WebJet Linhas Aéreas		WH	WEB	WEB-BRASIL	2004	2012	Sold to Gol Transportes Aéreos
Whitejets		W7	WTJ	WHITEJET	2010	2014	

a. German trade company that operated airline services in Brazil while also providing aircraft, maintenance and aviation information.

== See also ==
- List of airlines of Brazil
- Transportation in Brazil
