= Transportes Aéreos Sul-Americanos =

Brazilian airline

TASA – Transportes Aéreos Sul-Americanos
- Founded: 1948
- Ceased operations: 1949

TASA – Transportes Aéreos Sul-Americanos was a Brazilian airline founded in 1948. It ceased operations in 1949. Founded by the Italian Ciro Lisita and partners of São Paulo.

== History ==
TASA was founded in 1948 and flew between São Paulo and Goiânia with a single Douglas DC-3. TASA later bought two converted Douglas B-18 Bolo but never flew them. It ceased operations in 1949.

== Destinations ==
TASA flew to the following cities:

- Goiânia – Santa Genoveva Airport
- São Paulo – Congonhas Airport

== Fleet ==
TASA fleet
Aircraft	Total	Years of operation	Notes
Douglas DC-3	1	1948–1949	
Douglas B-18 Bolo	2	1948	Never operated

== See also ==
- List of defunct airlines of Brazil
