= Nacional Transportes Aéreos =

Brazilian airline (2000–2002)

- Founded: 2000
- Ceased operations: 2002

Nacional Transportes Aéreos was a Brazilian airline founded in 2000. It ceased operations in 2002.

== History ==
The low-fare carrier Nacional Transportes Aéreos was founded on December 26, 2000 and had as its first service the trunk route São Paulo-Guarulhos / Rio de Janeiro-Galeão / Recife / Fortaleza / São Luís, operated with a Boeing 737-400. The following year, Araçatuba, Brasília, Campo Grande, Cuiabá and Goiânia were added to the network. The Boeing 737-400 was returned to the leasor in April 2001 and replaced by a Boeing 737-200. A second 737-200 arrived in July 2001.

In January 2002, as a consequence of a financial crisis, Nacional was forced to return the aircraft and ceased all operations a few weeks later.

== Destinations ==
- Araçatuba – Dario Guarita Airport
- Brasília – Pres. Juscelino Kubitschek International Airport
- Campo Grande – Campo Grande International Airport
- Cuiabá – Marechal Rondon International Airport
- Fortaleza – Pinto Martins International Airport
- Goiânia – Santa Genoveva Airport
- Recife – Guararapes/Gilberto Freyre International Airport
- Rio de Janeiro – Galeão/Antonio Carlos Jobim International Airport
- São Luís – Marechal Cunha Machado International Airport
- São Paulo – Guarulhos/Gov. André Franco Montoro International Airport

== Fleet ==
Nacional Transportes Aéreos fleet
Aircraft	Total	Years of operation	Notes
Boeing 737-400	1	2000-2001	
Boeing 737-200	2	2001-2002	

== Airline Affinity Program ==
Nacional did not have an airline affinity program.

== See also ==
- List of defunct airlines of Brazil
