= Presidente Transportes Aéreos =

Brazilian airline

- Founded: 1996
- Ceased operations: 2001
- Headquarters: Presidente Prudente

Presidente Transportes Aéreos was a Brazilian airline founded in 1996. In 2001 it ceased operations.

== History ==
Presidente Transportes Aéreos was founded as a general aviation company in 1987. In 1996 it was authorized to become a regional scheduled carrier, with services operated from Presidente Prudente. In 1998 the company reduced operations and in May 1999 it was grounded. In 2000 the owner of the aircraft re-possessed the aircraft for lack of payment. As a last attempt for survival its operational base was transferred to Cuiabá but in 2001 Presidente ceased operations.

== Destinations ==
Presidente served the following cities:

- Aripuanã – Aripuanã Airport
- Assis – Marcelo Pires Halzhausen Airport
- Brasília – Pres. Juscelino Kubitschek International Airport
- Campo Grande – Campo Grande International Airport
- Cascavel – Adalberto Mendes da Silva Airport
- Cuiabá – Marechal Rondon International Airport
- Curitiba
- Foz do Iguaçu – Cataratas International Airport
- Goiânia – Santa Genoveva Airport
- Ituiutaba
- Juruena – Juruena Airport
- Nova Andradina
- Ourinhos – Jornalista Benedito Pimentel Airport
- Presidente Prudente – Presidente Prudente Airport
- Rondonópolis – Maestro Marinho Franco Airport
- São José do Rio Preto – Prof. Eribelto Manoel Reino Airport
- São Paulo – Congonhas Airport
- Sinop – Sinop Airport

== Fleet ==
Presidente Transportes Aéreos fleet
Aircraft	Total	Years of operation	Notes
Embraer EMB 110 Bandeirante	3	1996–2001	

== See also ==
- List of defunct airlines of Brazil
