= Flyways Linhas Aéreas =

Brazilian airline

IATA	ICAO	Call sign
—	FYW	—
- Founded: 2014
- Commenced operations: 2015
- Ceased operations: 2017
- Hubs: Belo Horizonte–Pampulha
- Fleet size: 0
- Destinations: 0
- Headquarters: Rio de Janeiro, Brazil
- Key people: Pedro Paulo Valverde Pedrosa

Flyways Linhas Aéreas Ltda. was a domestic airline based in Rio de Janeiro, Brazil, founded in 2014. The company slogan was Portuguese: Prazer em voar.

== History ==
Flyways was founded on June 11, 2014. The concession to operate air services was granted on December 16, 2015 by the National Civil Aviation Agency of Brazil. Flights started on December 28, 2015.

On 15 July 2016 the airline was grounded for maintenance of its sole aircraft and there is no set date to become airborne again.

On 8 March 2018 the concession to operate air services was revoked by the National Civil Aviation Agency of Brazil

On 12 August 2019 during a tow to be scrapped, the tractor was not able to hold the weight of the ATR 72-200 fuselage and suffered an accident with no injuries. On the following day, the metal successfully reached the scrap yard.

== Destinations ==
Flyways operated flights to the following cities:

City	Country	IATA	ICAO	Airport
Belo Horizonte	Brazil	PLU	SBBH	Pampulha–Carlos Drummond de Andrade Airport
Ipatinga	Brazil	IPN	SBIP	Usiminas Airport
Porto Seguro	Brazil	BPS	SBPS	Porto Seguro Airport (charter)
Rio de Janeiro	Brazil	GIG	SBGL	Galeão/Antonio Carlos Jobim International Airport
Uberaba	Brazil	UBA	SBUR	Mário de Almeida Franco Airport

== Fleet ==
The Flyways fleet consisted of the following aircraft (as of August 2016):

Flyways fleet
Aircraft	Total	Orders	Passengers (Y)	Notes
ATR 72-500	1		78	PR-TKN
ATR 72-200	1		68	PP-STY

== See also ==
- List of defunct airlines of Brazil
