= Skymaster Airlines =

Brazilian cargo airline

IATA	ICAO	Call sign
-	SKC	SKYMASTER AIR
- Founded: 1995
- Ceased operations: 2010
- Hubs: Eduardo Gomes International Airport
- Secondary hubs: São Paulo–Guarulhos International Airport
- Focus cities: None
- Fleet size: 0
- Destinations: Continental - Domestic
- Headquarters: Manaus, Brazil
- Website: http://www.skymaster.com.br

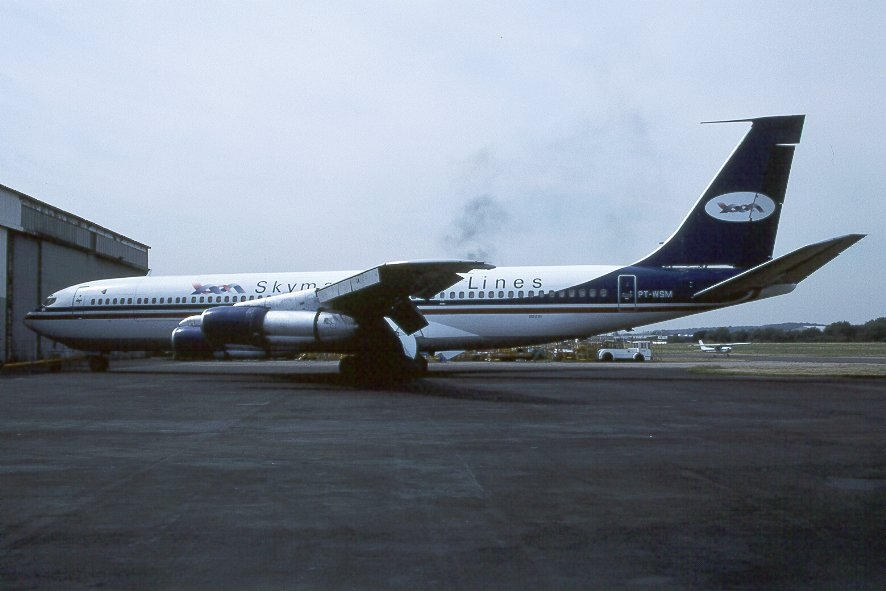
Boeing 707 of Skymaster Airlines at London Southend Airport in 1998

Skymaster Airlines was a cargo airline based in Manaus, Brazil. It operated charter cargo services in Brazil and other countries in the Americas.

== History ==
The airline was established on 30 November 1995 and started operations in 1997.

On February 19, 2014, Skymaster along with BETA Cargo were fined by CADE (Brazilian antitrust court) a combined 83 million reais (US$35 million), for running a cartel that hampered competition and drove up bid prices of procurements by the country's state-owned postal service Correios.

== Fleet ==
The Skymaster Airlines fleet included the following aircraft in August 2006, but the maximum was 8 :

- 5 Boeing 707-300F
- 1 Douglas DC-8-62CF
- 2 Douglas DC-8-63CF

== Crashes and Incidents ==
- On 7 March 2001, a Skymaster Airlines 707-320C, registration PT-MST, landed hard on Runway 09R, São Paulo-Guarulhos International Airport in São Paulo, Brazil. As a result of the landing the undercarriage failed, damaging all four engines and injuring three people. The aircraft was subsequently written off.

== See also ==
- List of defunct airlines of Brazil
