= Air Minas Linhas Aéreas =

Brazilian airline

IATA	ICAO	Call sign
6M	AMG	AIR MINAS
- Founded: 2002
- Ceased operations: 2010
- Hubs: Belo Horizonte/Pampulha - Carlos Drummond de Andrade Airport
- Fleet size: 6
- Parent company: Braspress
- Headquarters: Belo Horizonte, Brazil
- Key people: Urubatan Helou Teixeira
- Website: http://www.airminas.com.br/

Air Minas Linhas Aéreas was an airline based in Belo Horizonte, Minas Gerais, Brazil. It operated passenger services from Belo Horizonte to destinations in the states of Minas Gerais and São Paulo. The airline was grounded on May 30, 2010, and lost its operational license on September 20, 2011.

== History ==
The airline was established in 2002 by the businessman Clésio Andrade. In the end of 2005 it was bought by Urubatan Helu Teixeira for U$10 Million. The new owner has other transport interests including Brazil's largest courier company Braspress Transportes Urgentes.

Originally a general aviation company, Air Minas started its operations as a regular regional carrier on August 16, 2006. Its first service linked Belo Horizonte-Pampulha to Divinópolis, Varginha, and São Paulo-Guarulhos. In October of the same year, the services were extended to Bauru. In February 2007 Air Minas reached Araçatuba, Cuiabá and Rondonópolis and in May São José dos Campos, Campinas-Viracopos and Uberlândia.

The airline suspended all operations on May 30, 2010, for a major operational restructuring and on September 20, 2011, Air Minas lost its operational license. The fleet moving to CGR - Campo Grande Airport for stored, the former Skywest planes are sold to SETE (Brazil) and an African Operator. The former United Express plane sold to SETE, and 3 remanescent aircraft sold to Venezuela regional startup Albatros.

== Destinations ==
In May 2010, before suspending its scheduled flights, Air Minas operated services to the following destinations:

- Belo Horizonte – Pampulha/Carlos Drummond de Andrade Airport
- Ipatinga – Usiminas Airport
- Montes Claros – Mário Ribeiro Airport
- São Paulo – Guarulhos/Gov. André Franco Montoro International Airport
- Uberlândia – Ten. Cel. Av. César Bombonato Airport
- Uberaba – Mário de Almeida Franco Airport

Destinations terminated before suspension of services

Araçatuba, Campinas-Viracopos, Cuiabá, Divinópolis, Rondonópolis, São José dos Campos, Varginha

== Fleet ==
The fleet of Air Minas Linhas Aéreas included the following aircraft configured in all-economy class (as of June 2010):

Air Minas fleet
Aircraft	In Fleet	Passengers	Years of operation
Embraer EMB 120RT Brasília	6	30	2002–2010

== See also ==
- List of defunct airlines of Brazil
