= Aeronorte =

Brazilian airline

Aeronorte – Empresa de Transportes Aéreos Norte do Brasil
- Founded: 1949
- Ceased operations: 1961
- Headquarters: São Luís, Brazil
- Key people: Renato Archer

Empresa de Transportes Aéreos Norte do Brasil Ltda – Aeronorte was a Brazilian airline founded in 1940 that operated in the north and northeast regions of Brazil. It was bought by Aerovias Brasil in 1953 but maintained some degree of autonomy. When Varig bought Aerovias Brasil, Aeronorte was incorporated into Varig.

== History ==
Aeronorte was founded on December 30, 1949. In December 1950 Aeronorte rented a Junkers Ju 52 from VASP, and initiated flights from São Luís to Belém, to Carolina, and to Fortaleza, Recife and Salvador da Bahia.

It was acquired by Aerovias Brasil on January 15, 1953, but continued to operate as an autonomous unit in partnership with its new owner. When Real Transportes Aéreos acquired Aerovias Brasil in 1954 Aeronorte continued to operate with some autonomy as part of the consortium. This arrangement was dissolved in 1961 when Varig bought and integrated Aerovias Brasil, Real and its subsidiaries.

== Destinations ==
In January 1956 Aeronorte served 24 cities in the northeast region of Brazil.

== Fleet ==
Aeronorte fleet
Aircraft	Total	Years of operation	Notes
Percival P.50 Prince	3	1950–1952	
Junkers Ju 52/3m	1	1950–1951	
Lockheed L 10A Electra	3	1950–1953	
Beechcraft A.35 Bonanza	1	1951–1952	
Howard DGA-15 P	1	1952	
Lockheed 12A	1	1952–1956	
Douglas DC-3/C-47	3	1953–1961	
Curtiss C-46 Commando	4	1957–1961	

== Accidents and incidents ==
- 12 August 1951: a Lockheed L 10A Electra registration PP-NBD, had an accident in Turiaçu, Maranhão. Two crew members and one passenger died.
- 13 January 1953: a Lockheed L 10A Electra registration PP-NBC, had an accident while trying an emergency landing in the locality of Carema, Municipality of Rosário, Maranhão. Three crew members died.
- 15 March 1961: a Douglas DC-3 registration PP-YQS operating a flight from São Paulo had to divert to Ponta Grossa because of bad weather at the intended destination. The aircraft crashed into a hill while approaching the runway. Three crew members died.

== See also ==
- List of defunct airlines of Brazil
