= Rio Linhas Aéreas =

Brazilian cargo airline

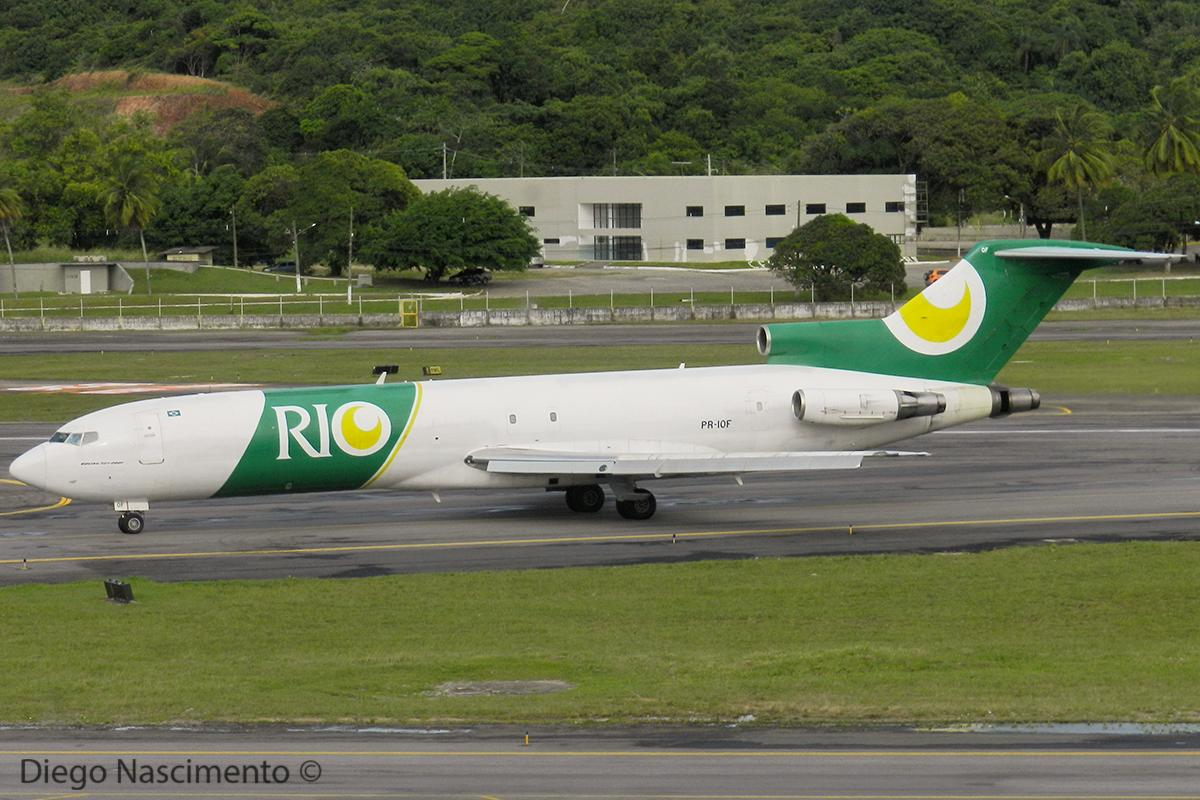
IATA	ICAO	Call sign
RL	RIO	RIO LINHAS
- Founded: 2007
- Commenced operations: July 29, 2009
- Ceased operations: January 2017
- Operating bases: Brasília; Curitiba; Rio de Janeiro–Galeão; São Paulo-Guarulhos
- Fleet size: 7
- Headquarters: Curitiba, Paraná, Brazil
- Key people: William Starostik Filho
- Website: riocargo.com

Rio Linhas Aéreas LTD was a Brazilian cargo airline based in Curitiba.

== History ==
The airline originally operated as JetSul. In 1998, however, it suspended its operations in order to restructure itself. In 2007, it started preliminary studies and tests. Cargo services started in July 2009, after receiving regulatory approval. It had codeshare agreements with Globex Cargo and Smart Cargo. In 2014, the Administrative Council for Economic Defense (CADE) approved the purchase of 49.99% by Brazilian Correios, but the purchase was not concluded. Rio Linhas Aéreas had night flight contracts to transport mail and packages for Correios (Brazilian Postal Service).

== Fleet ==
Rio Linhas Aéreas previously operated the following aircraft:

Aircraft	Total	Introduced	Retired	Notes
Boeing 727-200F	7	2009	2017	
Boeing 737-400SF	1	2014	2017	
Boeing 767-200BDSF	2	2011	2015	

== See also ==
- List of defunct airlines of Brazil
