= Transportes Charter do Brasil =

Brazilian cargo airline

| IATA | ICAO | Call sign |
|---|---|---|
| — | TCJ | Charter Brasil |
- Founded: 1994
- Ceased operations: 2006
- Destinations: Charter
- Headquarters: São Paulo

Transportes Charter do Brasil (TCB) was a cargo airline based in São Paulo, Brazil. It was established in 1994 and operated charter cargo services throughout the Americas until 2006. Its main base was Viracopos International Airport, São Paulo.

== Former fleet ==
- 1 Douglas DC-8-52 (PP-TPC) - still abandoned at Manaus Airport
- 1 Douglas DC-8-54JT (PP-TNZ) - Named "Guillermo Jr." Broken up at Guarulhos airport in november 2004.
- 1 Douglas DC-8-52F (PP-TAR) - operated in partnership with Promodal.
- 2 Douglas DC-8-63F

== See also ==
- List of defunct airlines of Brazil
