= Linhas Aéreas Wright =

Brazilian airline

- Founded: 1947
- Ceased operations: 1948
- Key people: Francisco Ribeiro Wright

Linhas Aéreas Wright Ltda was a Brazilian airline formed in 1947. In 1948 it was sold to Real Transportes Aéreos.

== History ==
Linhas Aéreas Wright was formed on April 1, 1947 by Francisco Ribeiro Wright and his brother and business partner. It had a fleet of two Lockheed Model 18 Lodestar aircraft operating between Rio de Janeiro and Santos. In March 1948 it was sold to Real Transportes Aéreos.

== Destinations ==
Wright operated between Rio de Janeiro and Santos.

== Fleet ==
Linhas Aéreas Wright fleet
| Aircraft | Total | Years of operation | Notes |
|---|---|---|---|
| Lockheed Model 18 Lodestar | 2 | 1947–1948 | |

== See also ==
- List of defunct airlines of Brazil
