= Mais Linhas Aéreas =

Brazilian airline

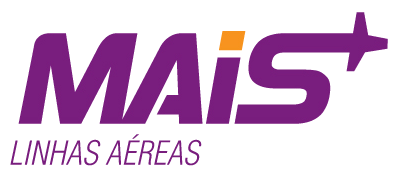
IATA	ICAO	Call sign
–	MLI	DEMAIS
- Founded: 2010
- Commenced operations: 2012
- Ceased operations: 2013
- Operating bases: Rio de Janeiro-Galeão
- Fleet size: 2
- Destinations: Charters
- Parent company: LATAM Airlines Group
- Headquarters: Rio de Janeiro, Brazil
- Website: www.voemais.com.br

Mais Linhas Aéreas S/A was an airline based in Rio de Janeiro, Brazil, founded in 2010. It was authorized to operate domestic regular and non-regular flights.

== History ==
Mais Linhas Aéreas was founded in 2010 and received its authorization to operate domestic flights on August 14, 2012.

== Destinations ==
As of August 2012 Mais Linhas Aéreas operates charter passenger services contracted by tour operators.

== Fleet ==
As of November 2012 the fleet of Mais Linhas Aéreas included the following aircraft:

Mais Linhas Aéreas fleet
Aircraft	Total	Orders	Passengers (Y)	Notes
Fokker 100	2	–	100	Introduced in 2012

== Airline affinity program ==
Mais Linhas Aéreas has no Frequent Flyer Program.

== See also ==
- List of defunct airlines of Brazil
