= Meta Linhas Aéreas =

Brazilian airline (1991–2011)

IATA	ICAO	Call sign
–	MSQ	META
- Founded: 1991
- Ceased operations: 2011
- Operating bases: Belém-Val de Cães; Boa Vista
- Headquarters: Boa Vista, Brazil
- Key people: Francisco Mesquita (founder, president)

Meta Linhas Aéreas (Formerly META - Mesquita Transportes Aéreos) was an airline based in Boa Vista, Roraima, Brazil, that operated domestic and international services to destinations in northern Brazil, Guyana, and Suriname. Its main base was Boa Vista-Atlas Brasil Cantanhede International Airport. The airline has been defunct since 2011.

== History ==
The airline was established in 1991 by Francisco Assunção Mesquita, as an airline specializing in general aviation. It was then called Mesquita Táxi Aéreo.

In 1997, it was granted a concession to fly regular flights and initiated those operations with an Embraer EMB 110 Bandeirante, flying from Boa Vista to Manaus and Porto Velho. At that time, it changed its name to Meta - Mesquita Transportes Aéreos.

In 1999, Meta received its first Embraer EMB 120 Brasília and was authorized to extend its operations to Santarém, Itaituba, Oriximiná, Macapá, Belém, Altamira, Monte Dourado, and Breves. With the delivery of a second Brasília, operations were further extended to Porto de Moz and Georgetown (Guyana).

In 2007, operations were downsized with the suspension of services to Breves, Monte Alegre, and Porto de Moz.

On 13 May 2011, the owner of Meta Linhas Aéreas was assassinated in Boa Vista. The company then entered more serious difficulties, eventually closing altogether.

== See also ==
- List of defunct airlines of Brazil
