= Tavaj Linhas Aéreas =

Brazilian airline

IATA	ICAO	Call sign
4U	TVJ	TAVAJ
- Founded: 1994; 32 years ago
- Commenced operations: 1994; 32 years ago
- Ceased operations: 2004; 22 years ago
- Headquarters: Manaus, Brazil
- Key people: José Idalberto da Cunha

TAVAJ Linhas Aéreas was a Brazilian airline founded in 1994 and based in Manaus, Brazil. It operated an extensive network in the Northern and Central-West regions of Brazil. It ceased operations in 2004.

== History ==

The airline traces its origins to an air taxi company Taxi Aéreo Vale do Juruá, established in Cruzeiro do Sul in September 1972. In March 1994 it was transformed into a regional scheduled operator, changed its name to TAVAJ Transportes Aéreos Regulares S/A, and moved its base to Rio Branco. In 2002 TAVAJ moved its base again, this time to Manaus. It ceased its operations in 2004.

Initially it was a direct competitor of TABA – Transportes Aéreos da Bacia Amazônica and flew with a fleet of 5 Embraer EMB 110 Bandeirante. In 1995 TAVAJ added further 2 EMB110 Bandeirante and the first Fokker F27 MK600. In 1997, as a project of major expansion, TAVAJ leased 4 Bombardier Dash 8-200B directly from the manufacturer but only 2 were delivered.

In 1999 TAVAJ suffered a hard blow during the currency exchange devaluation crisis. Because of high leasing and insurance costs, the airline was forced to return the 2 Dash 8-200B. Continuous economic difficulties lead TAVAJ to cease passenger operations in 2004.

== Destinations ==
In 1998 TAVAJ was operating flights to 31 cities in the states of Acre, Amazonas, Goiás, Mato Grosso, Pará, and Rondônia.

== Fleet ==
Tavaj Linhas Aéreas fleet
Aircraft	Total	Years of operation	Notes
Embraer EMB 110 Bandeirante	9	1994–2002	
Fokker F27 MK600	3	1995–2004	
Bombardier Dash 8-200B	2	1997–1999	
Embraer EMB 120 Brasília	1	1999–2001	

== See also ==
- List of defunct airlines of Brazil
