= COLT Cargo =

ACMI cargo airline based in Brazil

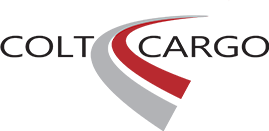
IATA	ICAO	Call sign
-	XCA	COLT
- Founded: 2013
- Ceased operations: 2017
- Fleet size: 3
- Parent company: COLT Aviation
- Headquarters: São Paulo, Brazil
- Website: www.coltcargo.com.br

Colt Linhas Aéreas, operating as COLT Cargo, was an ACMI cargo airline based in São Paulo, Brazil. It was founded in 2013 by COLT Aviation, a charter company.

== Fleet ==
COLT Cargo had operated the following aircraft:

COLT Cargo fleet
Aircraft	In service	Orders	Notes
Boeing 737-400SF	2	—	
Boeing 757-200SF	1	—	
Total	3	—	

== See also ==
- List of defunct airlines of Brazil
