= Viação Aérea Bahiana =

Brazilian airline

- Founded: 1945
- Ceased operations: 1948

Viação Aérea Bahiana was a Brazilian airline founded in 1945. It ceased operations on November 4, 1948.

== History ==
Viação Aérea Bahiana was founded on December 12, 1945 and flights started in February 1946. Panair do Brasil gave technical and administrative support for start-up but business was not successful and on November 4, 1948 it ceased operations.

== Destinations ==
Viação Aérea Bahiana served the following cities:

- Aracaju – Santa Maria Airport
- Campina Grande
- Ilhéus – Ilhéus Airport
- João Pessoa
- Maceió
- Penedo
- Recife
- Salvador da Bahia – 2 de Julho International Airport

== Fleet ==
Viação Aérea Bahiana fleet
Aircraft	Total	Years of operation	Notes
Lockheed Model 18 Lodestar	2	1946–1948	
Boeing 247D	1	1947–1948	
Douglas DC-3/C-47	3	1948	

== See also ==
- List of defunct airlines of Brazil
