= Linhas Aéreas Brasileiras =

Brazilian airline

LAB – Linhas Aéreas Brasileiras
- Founded: 1945
- Ceased operations: 1948
- Headquarters: Belém

LAB – Linhas Aéreas Brasileiras S.A. was a Brazilian airline founded in 1945. It ceased operations in 1948.

== History ==
LAB was founded on July 14, 1945 in Belém. Flights started on December 8, 1945 linking Rio de Janeiro with Salvador da Bahia via the coast. Later, the route was extended to São Paulo and cities in the northwestern part of Minas Gerais. It however had problems to maintain regularity and offered bad working conditions for its employees. It ceased operations in 1948.

== Destinations ==
Some of the cities served by LAB were:

- Rio de Janeiro – Santos Dumont Airport
- Salvador da Bahia – 2 de Julho International Airport
- São Paulo – Congonhas Airport

== Fleet ==
LAB fleet
Aircraft	Total	Years of operation	Notes
Douglas DC-3/C-47	5	1945–1948	

== See also ==
- List of defunct airlines of Brazil
