= Master Top Airlines =

Brazilian cargo airline

IATA	ICAO	Call sign
-	MST	MASTER
- Founded: 2006
- Ceased operations: 2011
- Hubs: São Paulo-Guarulhos International Airport
- Fleet size: 3
- Destinations: 4
- Headquarters: São Paulo, Brazil
- Key people: Jorge Craddoq (President)
- Website: www.mt-airlines.com

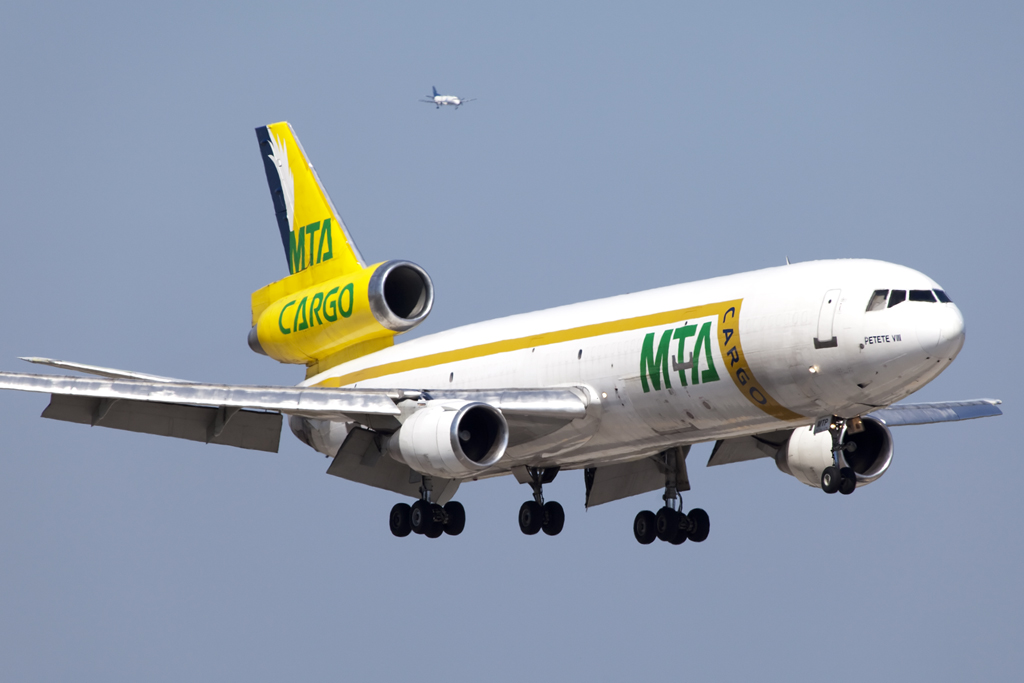
Master Top Airlines McDonnell-Douglas DC-10-30CF

Master Top Airlines (Master Top Linhas Aéreas Ltda.) was a Brazilian cargo airline. It operated scheduled cargo services between São Paulo and Manaus and beyond Manaus to Bogotá and Miami. It also operated charters. Master Top is based at São Paulo-Guarulhos International Airport and started operations in 2006.

== Fleet ==
The Master Top fleet (as of December 2010) was:

- 3 Douglas DC-10-30F

== See also ==
- List of defunct airlines of Brazil
