= Sterna Linhas Aéreas =

Brazilian cargo airline

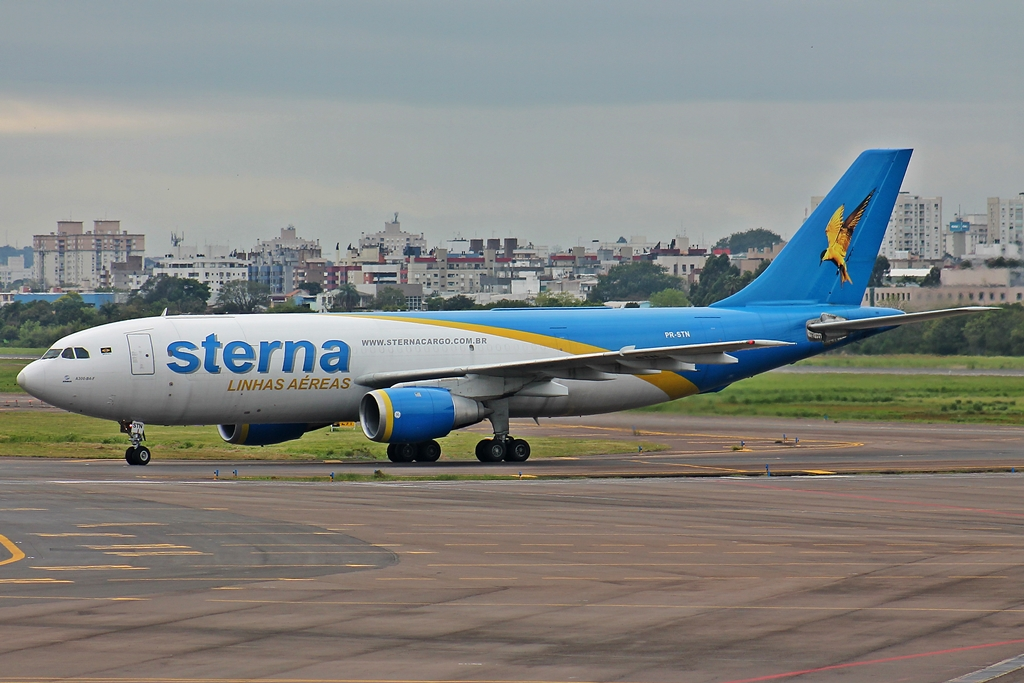
| IATA | ICAO | Call sign |
|---|---|---|
| – | STR | STERNA |
- Founded: 2014
- Commenced operations: 2015
- Ceased operations: 2017
- Hubs: Afonso Pena International Airport
- Fleet size: 0
- Headquarters: Brasília, Distrito Federal, Brazil
- Website: http://www.sternacargo.com.br/

Sterna Linhas Aéreas was a cargo airline based in Curitiba, Brazil, founded in 2014. It operated cargo services.

== Fleet ==
The Sterna Linhas Aéreas fleet consisted of a unique:

Sterna Linhas Aéreas fleet
| Aircraft | Total | Orders | Notes |
|---|---|---|---|
| Airbus A300 | 1 | – | Cargo |

== Accidents and incidents ==
- 21 October 2016: The Airbus A300-B4 registration PR-STN on a cargo flight between São Paulo-Guarulhos and Recife suffered a runway excursion after landing and the aft gear collapsed upon touchdown, in which the aircraft is still abandoned at airport after towed to coordinates 8°07'13.8"S 34°55'46.2"W, and then still in 8°07'27.3"S 34°55'37.1"W. The company ceased operations after this incident. No injuries were reported.

== See also ==
- List of defunct airlines of Brazil
