= Brasmex – Brasil Minas Express =

Brazilian cargo airline

Brasmex
IATA	ICAO	Call sign
-	BCA	BRASMEX
- Founded: January 2, 2001
- Commenced operations: December 14, 2002
- Ceased operations: February 2004
- Hubs: Viracopos International Airport
- Fleet size: 1
- Destinations: 4
- Headquarters: Campinas, Brazil
- Key people: Carlos Hamilton Martins Silva (President)

Brasmex – Brasil Minas Express Ltda. was a cargo airline based in São Paulo, Brazil.

== History ==
The airline was established on January 2, 2001, headed by Carlos Hamilton Martins Silva. With its operational headquarters at Viracopos International Airport, it had started operating on December 14, 2002 from São Paulo/Guarulhos International Airport. Brasmex operated with a single Douglas DC-10-30 leased from the CIT Group and was to receive a second and third DC-10 by the next year.

The airline was invested with US$50 million, of which US$20 million was employed in structure, maintenance, pilots and technical staff. The company even transported 26 million tons per kilometer of cargo, 70% of which being from the international market. In 2003, a total of 139 flights were carried out, of which 85 were abroad and 54 in the domestic market.

Brasmex stopped its activities in January 2004. It ceased operations in February 2004 due to financial issues.

== Destinations ==
Brasmex operated cargo services to:

Brazil

- Belo Horizonte
- Rio de Janeiro
- São Paulo
- Manaus

United States

- Miami

== Fleet ==
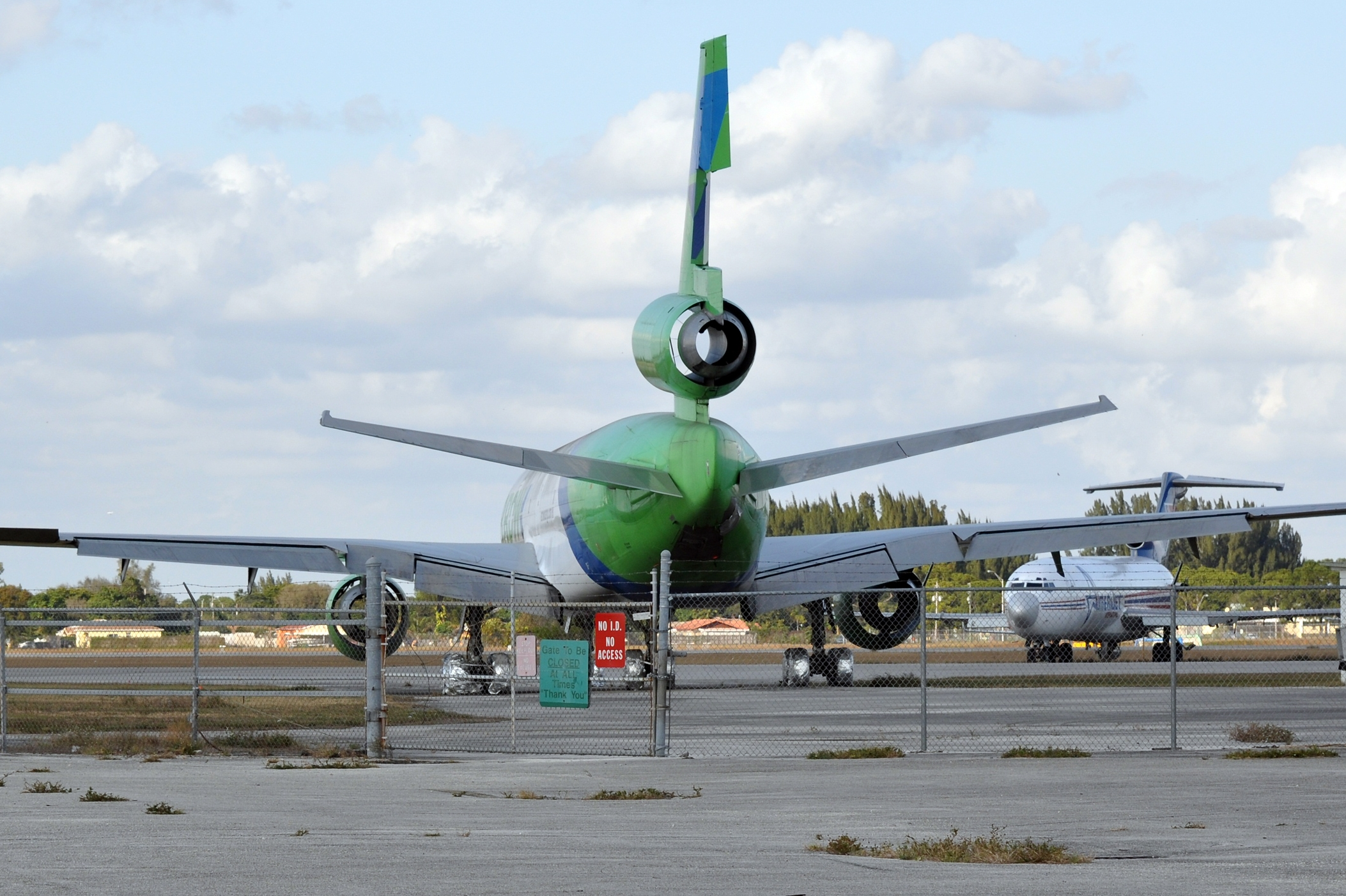
The sole McDonnell Douglas DC-10-30F operated by Brasmex, seen in storage at Miami-Opa Locka Executive Airport with another airline in 2012

Brasmex included the following aircraft:

- 1 McDonnell Douglas DC-10-30F (PR-BME)

== See also ==
- List of defunct airlines of Brazil
