= Houston Wing =

United States historical air display organization

CAF Houston Wing
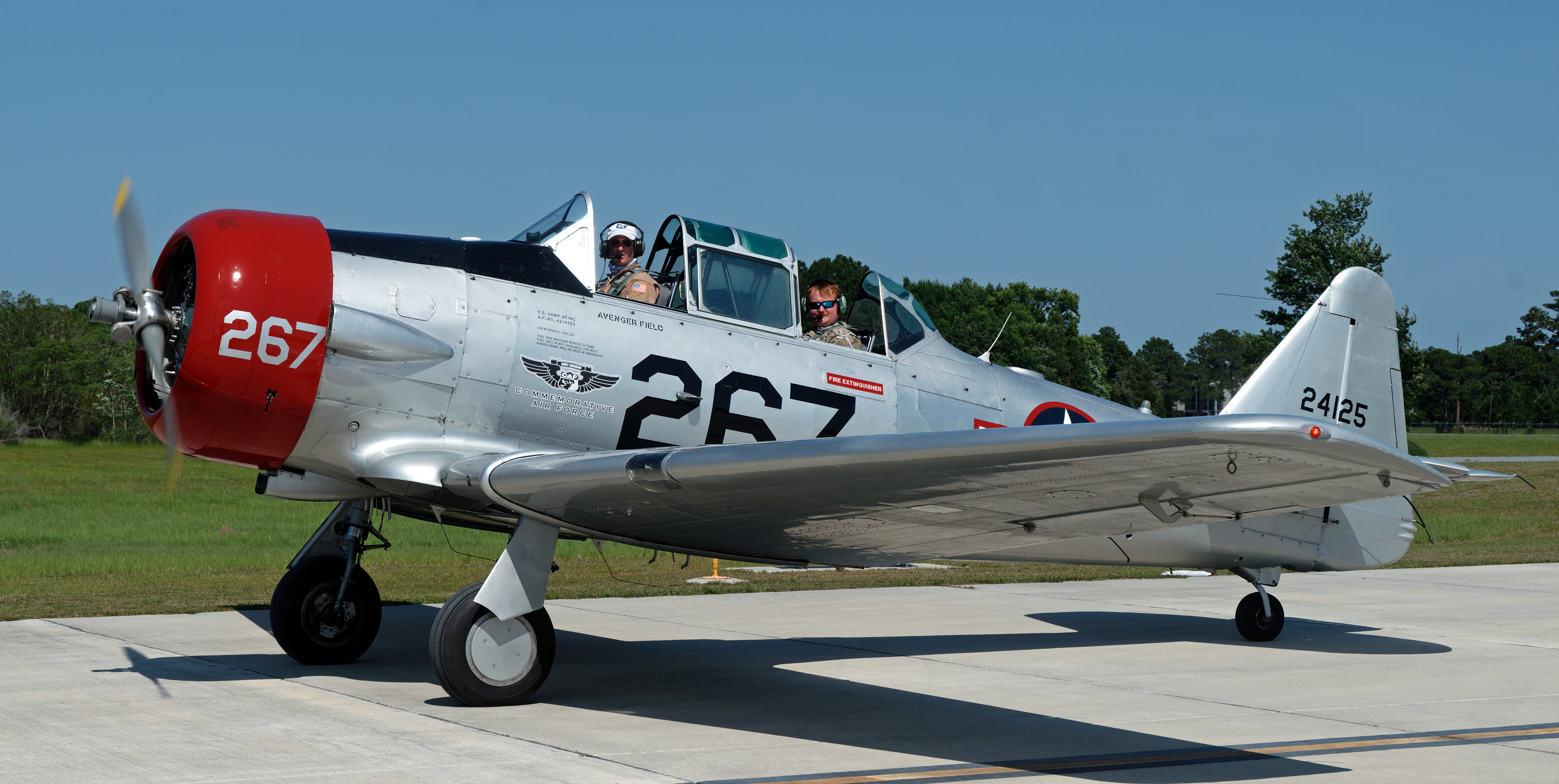
- Established: 1978
- Location: West Houston Airport; Hangar B-5; 18000 Groschke Road; Houston, Texas
- Coordinates: 29°49′19″N 95°40′37″W
- Type: Aviation museum
- Website: houstonwing.org

Houston Wing was founded in June 1978 as the West Houston Squadron (then under the West Texas Wing) of the Commemorative Air Force It is a United States historical air display organization and public history education focused on vintage aircraft of military aviation mainly of World War II time period. It also has a sizable museum with a broad collection of artifacts and themed displays.

== Aircraft Collection ==
Located at West Houston Airport since its foundation the organization occupies hangar B-5 and currently maintains a fleet of training aircraft used during World War II. They also are in process of restoring two post war aircraft, a Ryan L-17 Navion, and the nose section of an Aero L-39 Albatros. Also present is some aircraft engines on display, including one cutaway.

Current aircraft under care:

- Lockheed C-60A Lodestar Goodtime Gal – Paratroop Transport
- North American AT-6 Texan Ace in the Hole – Advanced Trainer
- Consolidated-Vultee BT-13 Valiant – Basic Trainer
- Naval Aircraft Factory N3N Canary – Primary Trainer
- Fairchild PT-19A Cornell – Primary Trainer
- North American L-17 Navion – Liaison Aircraft
- Cockpit section of an Aero L-39 Albatros - Advanced Trainer

Past aircraft:

- Stinson 108 in Civil Air Patrol markings
- Douglas DC-3 Dragon Lady

== Museum ==
While the in hangar museum is mostly on World War II aviation there is a large number of items from ground and naval forces including from belligerent nations (Germany and Japan), plus a few items from World War I and post World War II. There is also special displays for the Women Airforce Service Pilots, life in USA during the war, and one on the history of the CAF itself. A few items can be handled and operated by visitors, including an "Gibson Girl" Emergency Survival radio.

== Events ==
The museum is open first and third Saturday of each month (at the airport gate state you are going to museum) and special events for any size group can be organized in advance, including school events. Annual events include a Hangar Dance, the "Warbird Weekend" WW2 themed gathering of all types of vehicles and reenactors, and major participation with the Wings Over Houston air show at Ellington Airport.

== See also ==
- Trainer aircraft
- History of transport
