= Lockheed Model 18 Lodestar =

American passenger transport aircraft of the World War II era

Model 18 Lodestar C-56 / C-57 / C-60 / R5O
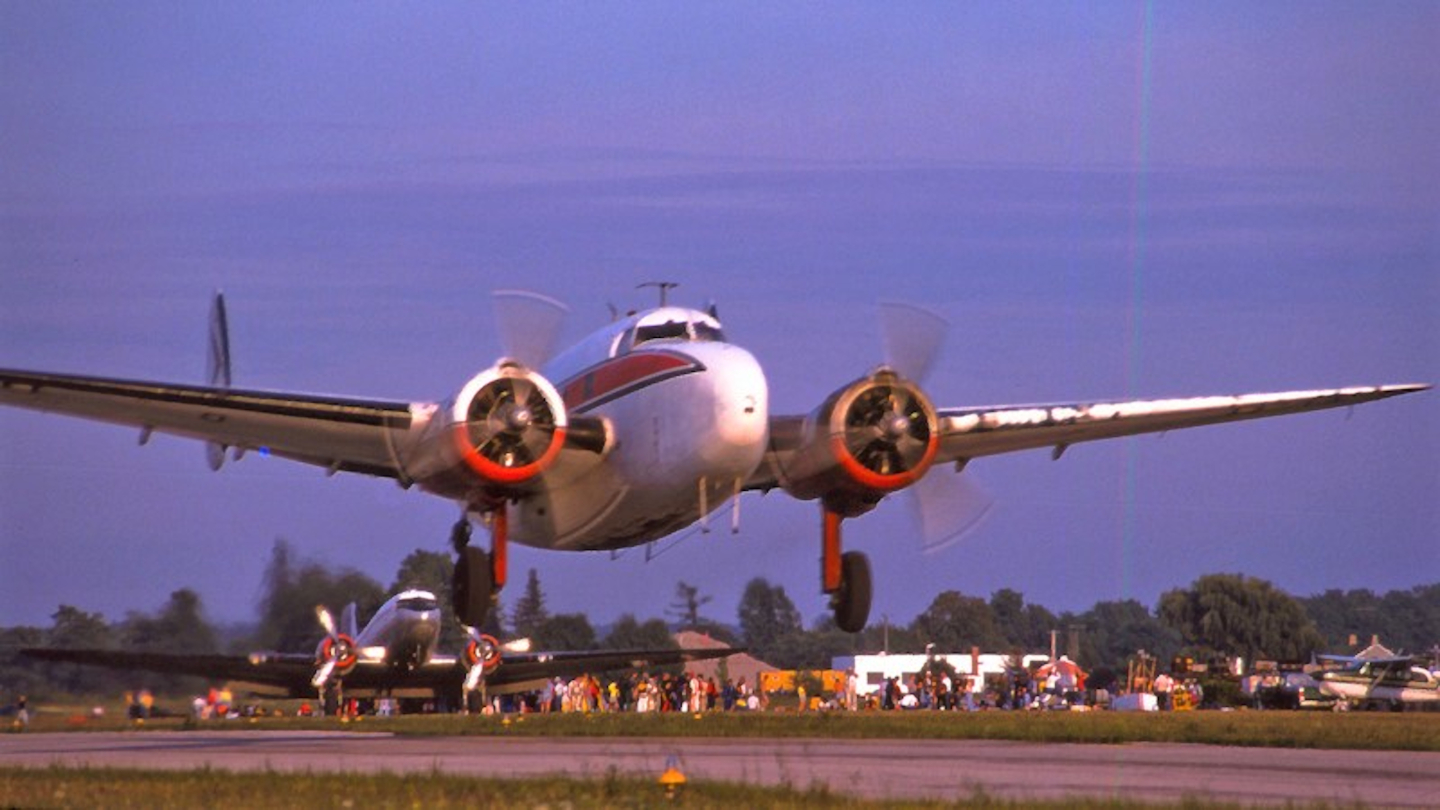
- Lockheed Lodestar flying skydivers at Goderich, 1977

General information
- Type: Passenger transport
- National origin: United States
- Manufacturer: Lockheed
- Primary user: United States Army Air Corps
- Number built: 625

History
- Introduction date: 30 March 1940
- First flight: 21 September 1939
- Developed from: Lockheed Model 14 Super Electra
- Variant: Lockheed Ventura

The Lockheed Model 18 Lodestar is an American passenger transport aircraft of the World War II era, developed as part of the Model 10 Electra family, specifically from the Lockheed Model 14 Super Electra.

== Design and development ==
Sales of the 10–14 passenger Lockheed Model 14 Super Electra, which first flew in 1937, had proved disappointing, despite the aircraft's excellent performance. It was more expensive to operate than the larger Douglas DC-3, already in widespread use. In order to improve the type's economics, Lockheed decided to stretch the aircraft's fuselage by 5 feet 6 inches (1.68 m), allowing an extra two rows of seats to be fitted.

The prototype for the revised airliner, designated Model 18 by Lockheed, was converted from the fourth Model 14, one of a batch which had been returned to the manufacturer by Northwest Airlines after a series of crashes. The modified aircraft first flew in this form on 21 September 1939, another two prototypes being converted from Model 14s, with the first newly built Model 18 flying on 2 February 1940.

A total of 625 Lodestars of all variants were built.

== Operational history ==
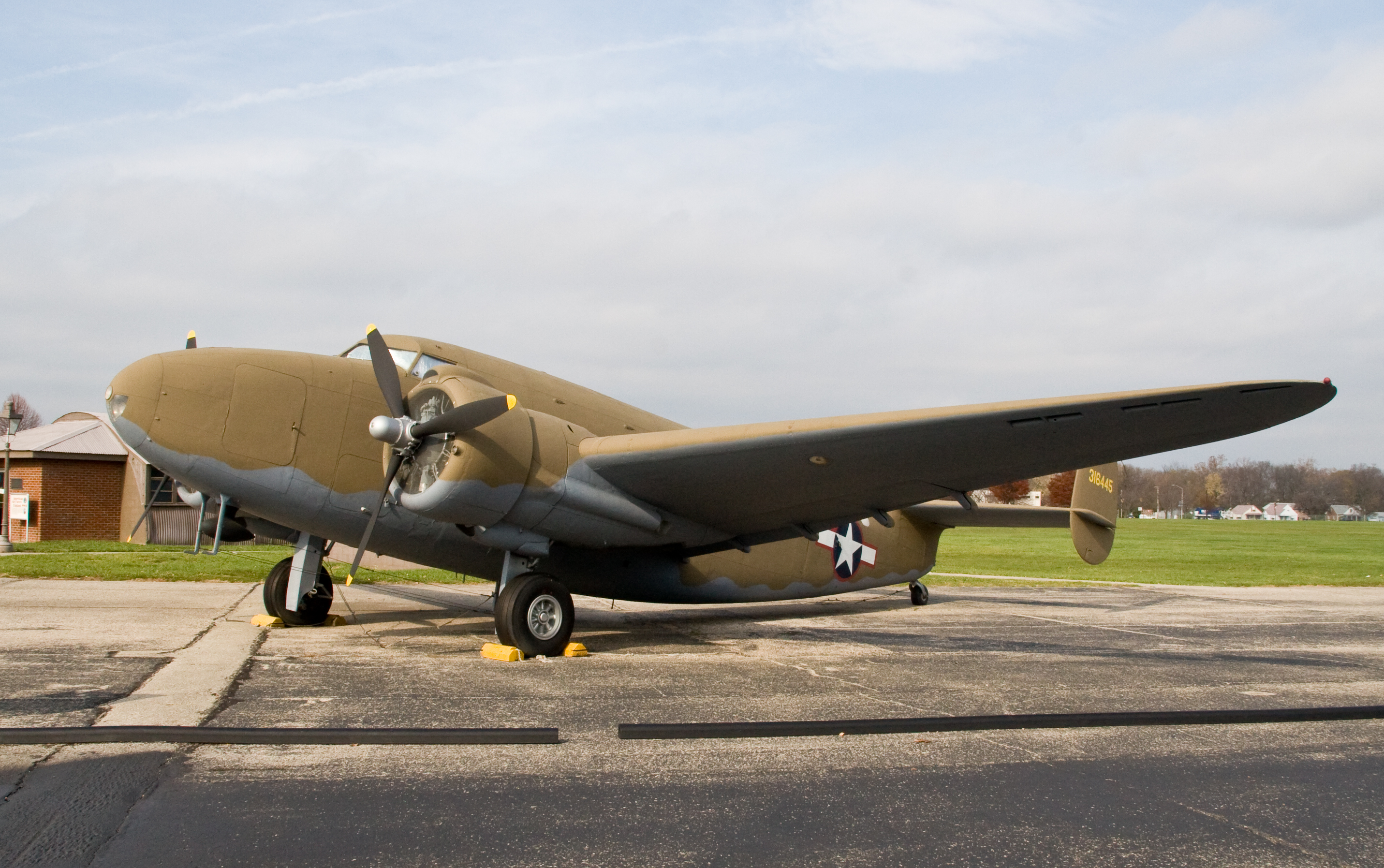
Lockheed Lodestar

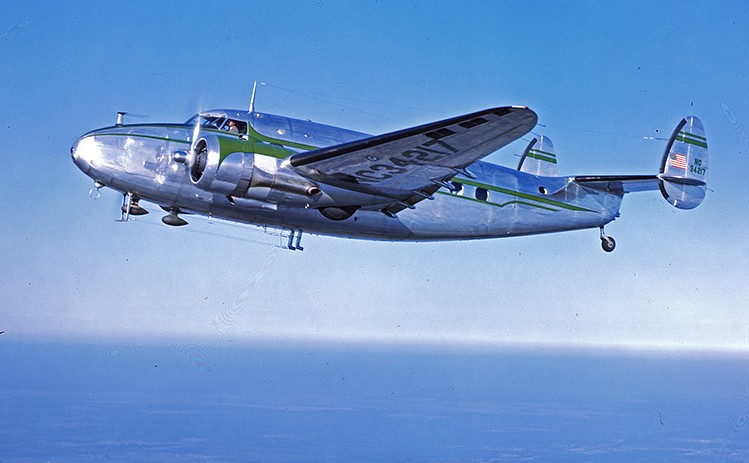
Lockheed Model 18 Lodestar over Houston, 1947 or 1948

The Lodestar received its Type certificate on 30 March 1940, allowing it to enter service with the first customer, Mid-Continent Airlines that month. As hoped, the extra seats greatly improved the Model 18's economics, reducing its seat-mile costs to a similar level to that of the DC-3, while retaining superior performance. Despite this, sales to US domestic customers were relatively slow as most US airlines were already committed to the DC-3, with only 31 Lodestars going to US airlines. Overseas sales were a little better, with the biggest airline customers being South African Airways (21), New Zealand National Airways Corporation (13), Trans-Canada Air Lines (12) and BOAC (9); another 29 were bought by the Royal Netherlands East Indies Army Air Force. Various Pratt & Whitney and Wright Cyclone powerplants were installed.

When the United States started to build up its military air strength in 1940–41, many American-operated Lodestars were impressed as the C-56. This was followed by the construction of many new-build Lodestars which were flown by the U.S. Army Air Forces as the C-60 and by the U.S. Navy and U.S. Marine Corps as the R5O. Lend-lease aircraft were used by the RNZAF as transports.

One was purchased in 1942 to serve as Brazilian President Getúlio Vargas' personal aircraft. This aircraft was specially designed for that purpose and had 11 seats.

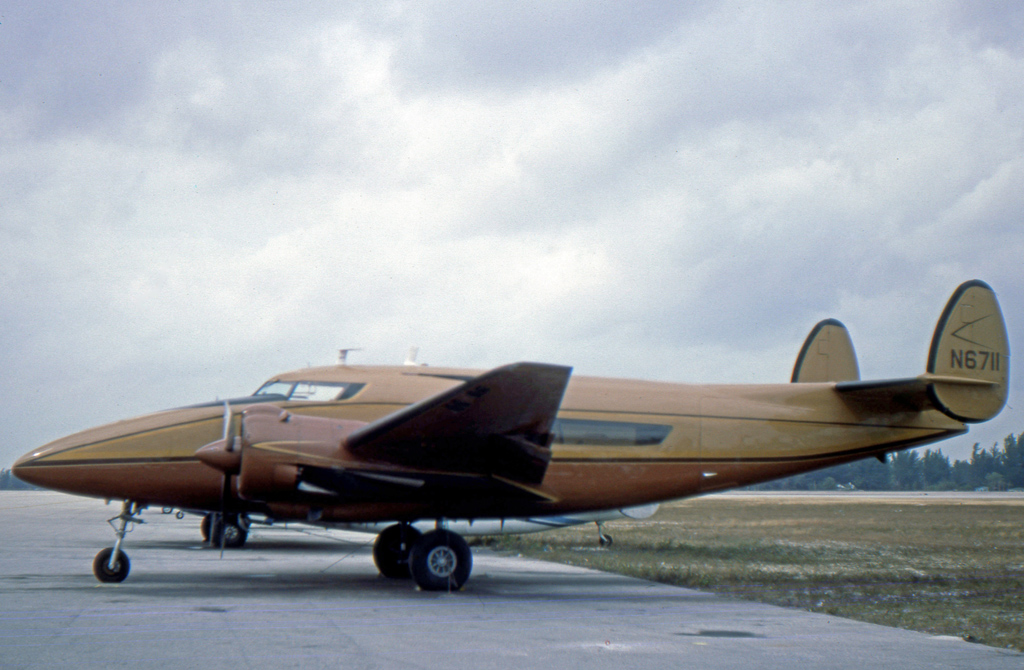
Howard 250 Lodestar conversion fitted with tri-gear. At Opa Locka Airport near Miami in 1981

After the war many Lodestars were overhauled and returned to civilian service, mostly as executive transports such as Dallas Aero Service's DAS Dalaero conversion, Bill Lear's Learstar (produced by PacAero), and Howard Aero's Howard 250. A few of the latter were converted to tricycle landing gear.

While the surviving New Zealand NZNAC aircraft were sold back overseas in 1951-52, six more were later imported and converted for aerial topdressing.

A single Lodestar served with the Israeli Air Force during the 1948 Arab-Israeli War.

A number of skydiving operations in the United States used Lodestars during the 1970s and 1980s.

== Variants ==
18-07
Powered by two 875 hp Pratt & Whitney Hornet S1E2-G engines; 25 built plus two prototypes.
18-08
Powered by two 1,200 hp Pratt & Whitney Twin Wasp S1C3-G engines; 33 built.
18-10
Powered by two 1,200 hp Pratt & Whitney Twin Wasp S1C3-G engines; 39 built.
18-14
Powered by two 1,200 hp Pratt & Whitney Twin Wasp S4C4-G engines; four built.
18-40
Powered by two 1,200 hp Wright Cyclone G-1820-G104A engines; 26 built.
18-50
Powered by two 1,200hp Wright Cyclone G-1820-G202A engines; 13 built.
18-56
Powered by two 1,200hp Wright Cyclone GR-1820-G205A, R-1820-40 or R-1820-87 engines.

=== US Army Lodestars ===
C-56
Powered by 1,200 hp Wright 1820-89 engines, one Model 18-50 for evaluation.
C-56A
One impressed Model 18-07 with two Pratt & Whitney R-1690-54 engines.
C-56B
Thirteen impressed Model 18-40s with two Wright 1820-97 engines.
C-56C
Twelve impressed Model 18-07.
C-56D
Seven impressed Model 18-08.
C-56E
Two Model 18-40s impressed in 1943.
C-57
As Model 18-14 powered by two 1,200 hp Pratt & Whitney R-1830-53 engines.
C-57A
Allocated for impressed aircraft, not used.
C-57B
Based on Model 18-08 fitted for trooping; seven aircraft built.
C-57C
Repowered C-60A with Pratt & Whitney R-1830-51 engines; three aircraft converted.
C-57D
Repowered C-57C with Pratt & Whitney R-1830-92 engines; one aircraft converted.
C-59
Based on Model 18-07 powered by Pratt & Whitney R-1690-25 Hornet engines; 10 aircraft built, transferred to Royal Air Force as Lodestar IA.
C-60
Model 18-56 powered by Wright R-1820-87 engines; 36 aircraft built, some transferred to RAF as Lodestar II.
C-60A
As the C-60 but fitted out as a paratroop transport powered by Pratt & Whitney R-1830 Twin Wasp engines; 325 aircraft built.
XC-60B
One C-60A fitted with experimental de-icing equipment.
C-60C
Proposed 21-seat troop transport aircraft, never built.
C-66
Powered by Wright R-1820-87 engines; one aircraft built, 11-passenger interior for transfer to the Brazilian Air Force.
C-104
Original designation for C-60C

=== US Navy Lodestars ===
XR5O-1
One Model 18-07 acquired for evaluation powered by 1,200 hp (895 kW) Wright R-1820-40 engines.
R5O-1
Staff transport powered by 1,200 hp (895 kW) Wright R-1820-97 engines; three aircraft built, two for the USN and one for the United States Coast Guard (USCG).
R5O-2
Navy version of the C-59 powered by 850 hp (634 kW) Pratt & Whitney R-1690-25 engines; one aircraft built.
R5O-3
Powered by 1,200 hp (895 kW) Pratt & Whitney R-1830-34A engines. Originally 4-seater VIP transports; three aircraft built.
R5O-4
Powered by 1,200 hp (895 kW) Wright R-1820-40 engines. Impressed. 7-seater staff transports; 12 aircraft built. The USCG acquired four in late 1942.
R5O-5
Navy version of the C-60 powered by 1,200 hp (895 kW) Wright R-1820-40 engines. Similar to the R5O-4 but had 14-seats; 38 aircraft built and three former NEIAF aircraft. Three were acquired by the USCG in late 1942.
R5O-6
Navy version of the C-60A for the US Marine Corps, equipped with 18 paratroop seats; 35 built.

== Operators ==
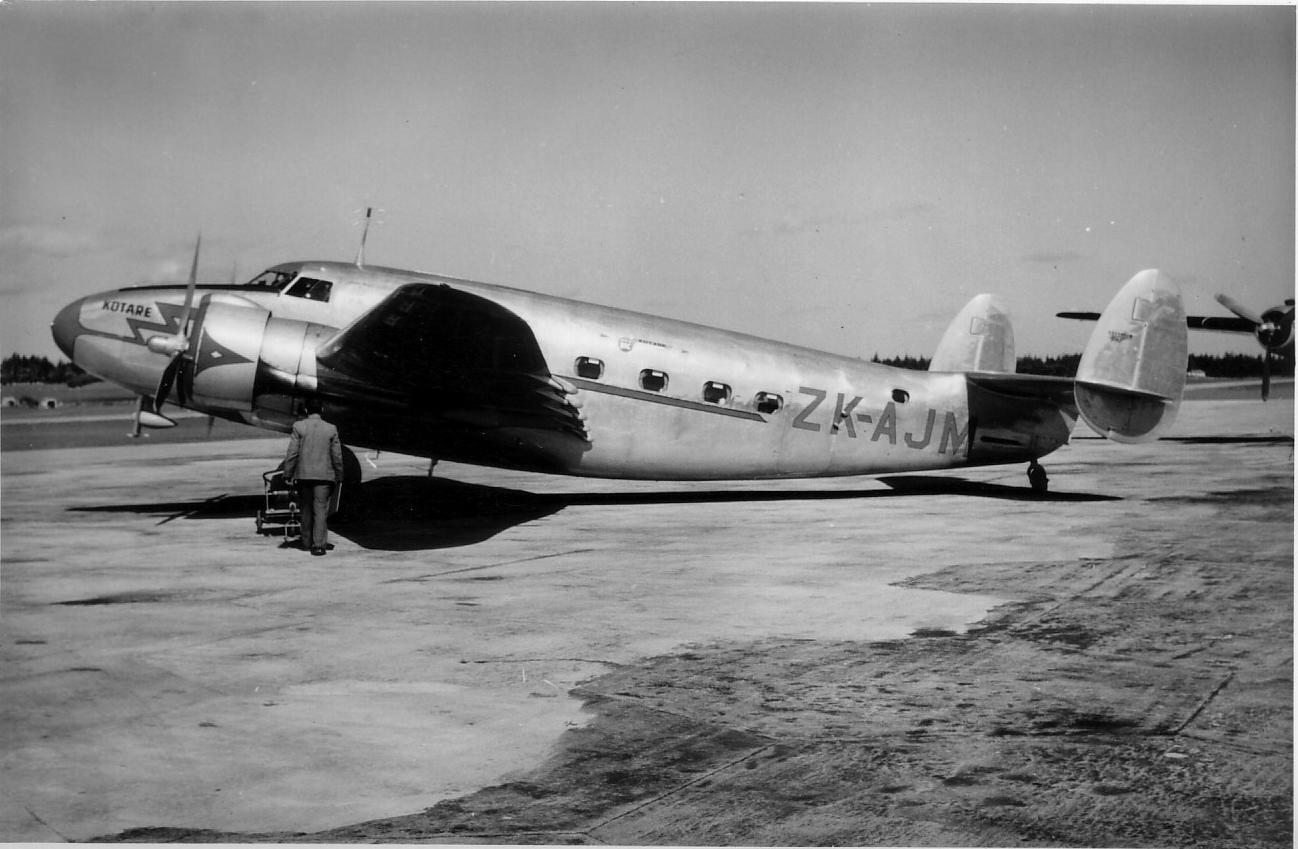
A Lodestar of National Airways Corporation in 1947.

=== Civil operators ===
Australia

- Trans-Australia Airlines (TAA) - two, operated 1952–1953.

Belgium

- SABENA (mainly in Africa)

Bolivia

- Lloyd Aéreo Boliviano (LAB)

Brazil

- Linhas Aéreas Wright
- NAB – Navegação Aérea Brasileira
- Panair do Brasil - 6 Model 18-10s delivered new.
- SAVAG (Sociedade Anônima Viação Aérea Gaúcha) - Two Model 18-10s bought from Panair do Brasil.
- Transportes Aéreos Universal
- Viação Aérea Bahiana

Canada

- Trans-Canada Air Lines - 12 Model 18-10s delivered new.)
- Yukon Southern Air Transport - Two Model 18-10s delivered new.)
- Canadian Pacific Air Lines (purchased Yukon Southern Air Transport in 1941)

Chile

- Línea Aérea Nacional (LAN) (1943–1953)
- CINTA Chilean Airlines (1953–1959)

Finland

- Karhumäki Airways

France

- Air Afrique (the prewar airline, unrelated to the postwar airline of the same name) - Five Model 18-07s delivered new.)
- Air France - Three Model 18-07s delivered new.
- Aero Africaine (part of Société Africaine des Transports Tropicaux (SATT), based in Algeria)

Honduras

- TACA Airways System

Kenya, Tanganyika, Uganda and Zanzibar

- East African Airways - Received six ex-BOAC Model 18-07s in 1948.

New Zealand

- Union Airways of New Zealand (1945–1947)
- National Airways Corporation (post 1947)

Portugal

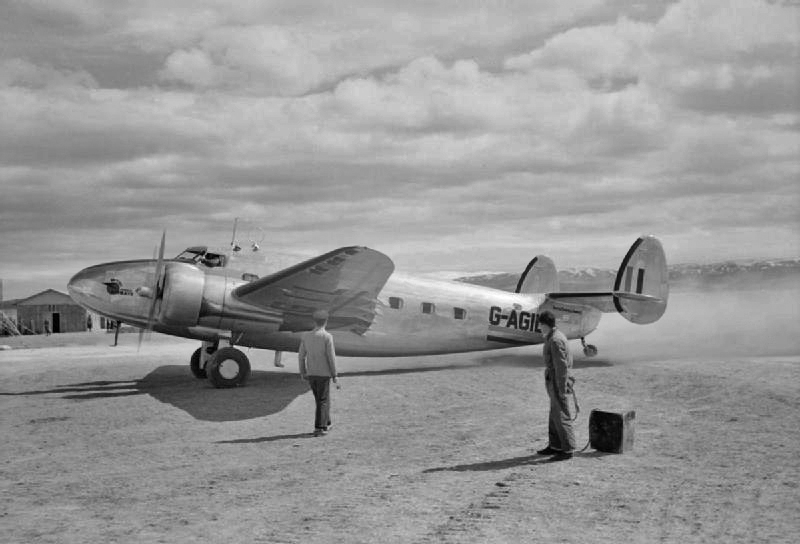
BOAC Lockheed 18, Ankara, ca. 1942

- Aero Portuguesa
- DETA Mozambique Airways (serving Portugal's colony of Mozambique)

Puerto Rico

- Caribbean-Atlantic Airlines

South Africa

- South African Airways Purchased 29 Model 18-08s from new.
- Commercial Air Services operated two aircraft.

Sweden

- Linjeflyg (1957–1960)

Trinidad and Tobago

- British West Indian Airways

United Kingdom

- BOAC (British Overseas Airways Corporation) - Purchased nine, new-build, Model 18-07s supplemented by 29 second hand aircraft (Model 18-07, 18–10, 18–40, 18-50 C-59, C60 and C60A).)

United States

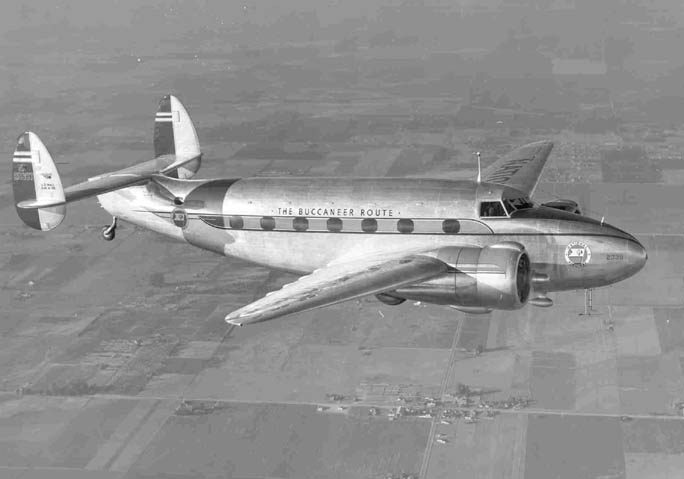
National Airlines Lockheed 18

- Continental Air Lines - Two Model 18-08s and three 18-10s delivered new.
- Mid-Continent Airlines - Three Model 18-07s and one Model 18-10 delivered new.
- National Airlines - Three Model 18-50s delivered new.
- Pan American Airways - Six Model 18-10s delivered new.
- United Air Lines - Four Model 18-10s delivered new.
- Inland Air Lines - One Model 18-08 delivered new.
- Western Air Lines (purchased Inland Air Lines in 1944 and operated it as a separate division)
- Alaska Star Airlines (renamed to Alaska Airlines in 1944) (one Model 18-56)
- Tennessee Valley Authority - one for internal use

Venezuela

- Línea Aeropostal Venezolana (LAV) - One Model 18-10 delivered new.)

=== Military operators ===
Australia

- Royal Australian Air Force

Brazil

- Brazilian Air Force (Seven × C-60A and one C-66, C-66 Known by its call sign Brazilian Air Force One)

Canada

- Royal Canadian Air Force (18 × C-60A)
  - No. 164 Squadron RCAF
  - No. 165 Squadron RCAF

Colombia

- Colombian Air Force (C-60 as VIP transport)

Haiti

- Haiti Air Corps

Israel

- Israeli Air Force

Mexico

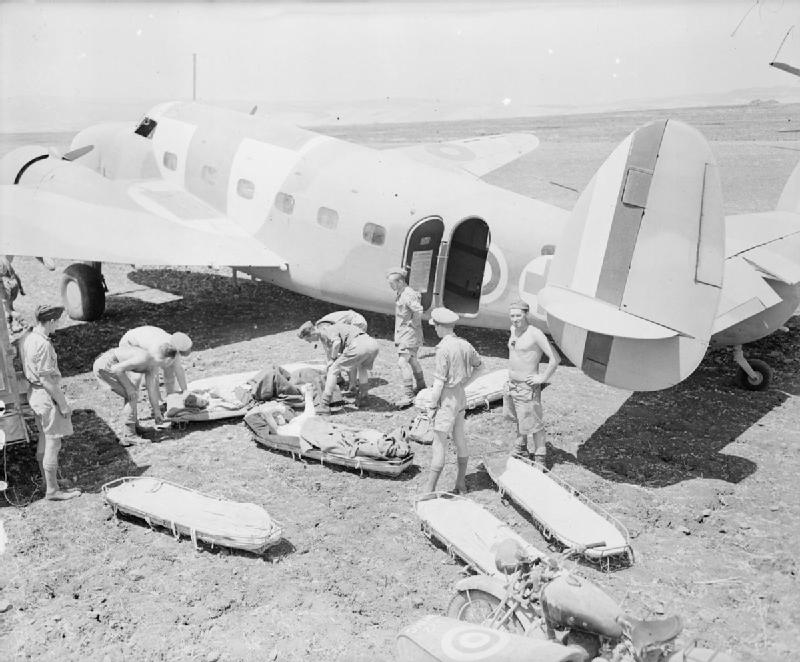
SAAF Lodestar 18 ambulance aircraft, at Catania, Sicily circa 1944

- Mexican Air Force

Netherlands

- Royal Netherlands East Indies Air Force (20 Model 18-40s and nine Model 18-50s delivered)

New Zealand

- Royal New Zealand Air Force
  - No. 40 Squadron RNZAF
  - No. 41 Squadron RNZAF

Norway

- Norwegian Air Force (Three delivered to the Norwegian government in exile)

South Africa

- South African Air Force

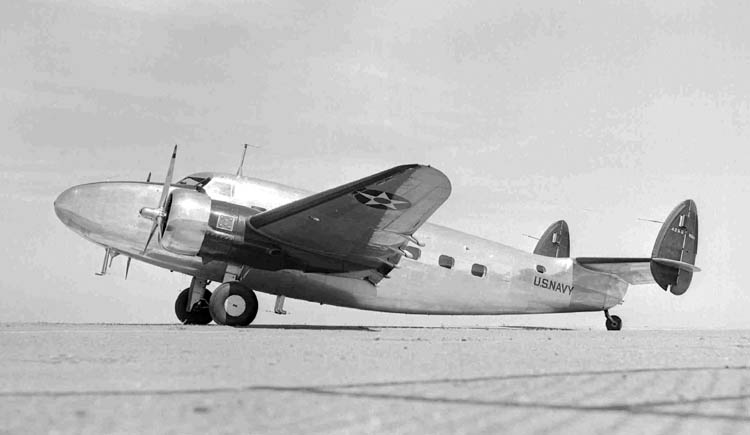
Lockheed R5O-1, staff transport for the Secretary of the Navy. At San Francisco on August 4, 1941.

United Kingdom

- Royal Air Force

United States

- United States Army Air Corps
- United States Navy
- United States Marine Corps
- United States Coast Guard

== Accidents and incidents ==
On the 28th of March 1941 a South African Airways Lockheed Lodestar, on a flight from Windhoek to Cape Town flew into a cliff next to the sea near Baboon Point close to Elands Bay, in thick mist, with total loss of life of all on board (pilot and six passengers). Notable amongst the passengers was Rear Admiral GW Hallifax, who was the first director of the South African Seaward Defence Force, the forerunner of the South African Navy. Some parts of the wreckage are on display at the Elands Bay Museum.

On 5 January 1948, a South African Airways Lockheed Model 18 Lodestar (registration ZS-ASW) touched down at Palmietfontein too far along the runway for it to stop before running off the end. The undercarriage was ripped off and the hull damaged beyond repair. There were light injuries to passengers but no fatalities.

Between 1941 and 1944, the Panair do Brasil airline suffered 4 accidents involving the Lodestar which resulted in a total of 57 fatalities.

In January 1943, Lockheed Lodestar Mk.II EW986, c/n 2154, in the service of the Royal Air Force, overshot and crashed 3 km south of Heliopolis, Egypt. At least 12 crew members and passengers died in the crash. A cause of the accident was not determined. Among those killed were Air Vice-Marshal Wilfred Ashton McClaughry, CB, DSO, MC, DFC and Lady Rosalinde Tedder née MacLardy, wife of Marshal of the Royal Air Force Arthur William Tedder, 1st Baron Tedder, GCB.

In 1949, a Lockheed Lodestar in airline service in Australia crashed immediately after takeoff. All 21 occupants died in the crash or the ensuing conflagration. The cause of the accident was determined to be that the center of gravity was behind the rear limit. It is also likely the elevator trim tab was set for landing rather than takeoff.

On 10 April 1953, a Caribbean International Airways operated Lockheed Lodestar (registration VP-JBC) with airline owner, Royal Air Force officer and aviator Owen Roberts, as its pilot in command, suffered engine failure during takeoff from Palisadoes Airport. The plane then entered a banking turn and went down in the Caribbean Sea near Lime Cay. All but one of the 14 occupants were killed in the crash, including Roberts, and leaving Roberts’ brother-in-law, Edward Remington Hobbs, as sole survivor.

On 20 December 1956, Alden G. Roach, president of the Consolidated Western Steel and the Columbia-Geneva-Steel Divisions of U.S. Steel, pilot and co-pilot crash near Tyrone, Pennsylvania, Model 18-56, N 1245V, U.S. Steel owned company plane. Causes unknown.

On 22 March 1958, Mike Todd's private plane Lucky Liz, named after his wife Elizabeth Taylor, crashed near Grants, New Mexico. The plane, a twin-engine Lockheed Lodestar, suffered engine failure while being flown overloaded, in icing conditions at too-high an altitude for the loading. The plane went out of control and crashed, killing all four on board.

On 4 September 1962, a Lockheed 18-56-24 Lodestar operated by the Ashland Oil and Refining Company crashed near Lake Milton, Ohio. The flight was in-route to Ashland Regional Airport (KDWU) from Buffalo Airport, NY. Eleven passengers and two crew-members were killed. Investigation determined the crash a result of a malfunction of the electric elevator trim tab, which caused the loss of the plane's right wing during flight.

On 21 August 1983, a Lockheed L-18 LEARStar operated by Landry Aviation, Inc. crashed near Silvana, Washington. The flight was a planned parachute drop carrying two pilots and 22 parachutists. Nine parachutists and two crew-members were killed while 13 were able to parachute to safety after the pilots lost control and entered a vertical descent from 12,500 feet. Investigation determined the crash a result of a failure of the operator and pilot-in-command to assure proper load distribution during the parachute drop.

== Surviving aircraft ==
=== Brazil ===
- FAB 2006 – C-60A on static display at the Museu Aeroespacial in Rio de Janeiro.
- PT-CGV – L18-56 on static display at the Museu Matarazzo in Bebedouro, São Paulo.

=== Canada ===
- c/n 18-2064 – L18-08 under restoration by students at the Aerospace Centre of the University of the Fraser Valley for static display at the Canadian Museum of Flight. It was previously on display at the Victory Air Museum in Mundelein, Illinois.
- c/n 18-2220 – L18-08 in storage at the Reynolds Museum in Wetaskiwin, Alberta. It was previously registered as CF-TDB.

=== Finland ===
- c/n 18-2006 – L18-56 on static display at the Finnish Aviation Museum in Helsinki. It was previously registered as OH-VKU, N9955F, N9965F, and F-ARTF.

=== New Zealand ===
- c/n 18-2020 – C-60 on static display at the Museum of Transport & Technology, Auckland. It was built for United Airlines in October 1940 and registered as NC25630. It was impressed into United States Army Air Forces with the serial number 42-53504. In September 1941 it was transferred to the Royal Air Force as AX756. Next, it was operated as G-AGCN by the British Overseas Airways Corporation in East Africa. After serving with the Spanish Air Force, it was sold back to the United States where it was registered as N9933F. Sold again to FieldAir in either 1957 or 1958 it was converted to an aerial topdresser and given the registration ZK-BVE. It was damaged in a wheels up landing in 1969.
- c/n 18-2152 – C-60 under restoration with the Gisborne Aviation Preservation Society in Gisborne. It was previously operated by the Royal Air Force as EW984 and Spanish Air Force. Sold to civilian ownership, it was first registered in the United States as N9930F in 1955. It was converted to an aerial topdresser by Fieldair in 1957 and registered as ZK-BUV. It was a gate guardian at Gisborne Airport from 1973 to 1998.
- c/n 18-2388 – L18-56 on static display at the National Transport & Toy Museum in Wānaka.

=== Norway ===
- c/n 18-2444 – C-60A on static display with the Norwegian Armed Forces Aircraft Collection at Gardermoen.

=== South Africa ===
- c/n 18-2026 – L18-08 on static display at the South African Airways Museum in Germiston, Gauteng. It was previously operated by South African Airways as ZS-ASN.

=== Sweden ===
- c/n 18-0056 – L18-56 on static display at the Flygsamlingar Arlanda in Märsta, Stockholm.

=== United States ===
- c/n 18-2035 – XC-60B on static display at the Castle Air Museum at the former Castle Air Force Base in Atwater, California.
- c/n 18-2232 - L18-56 Howard 250 factory test aircraft airworthy with Todd Schultz of Bakersfield, California.
- c/n 18-2404 – R5O-5 airworthy with Lawrence E. Hill of Marion, Montana.
- c/n 18-2302 – C-60 on display at the 1940 Air Terminal Museum in Houston, Texas. It has been converted for use as an executive aircraft.
- c/n 18-2347 – C-60 in storage in Corinth, Mississippi.
- c/n 18-2359 – C-57 derelict static display since 1973 at Bowman Field (Kentucky), Louisville, Kentucky.
- c/n 18-6124 – L18-56 airworthy with Chris Galloway of Knights Landing, California.
- 41-19729 – C-56 on static display at the Travis Air Force Base Heritage Center at Travis Air Force Base near Fairfield, California.
- 42-32181 – C-60 on static display at the Planes of Fame Air Museum in Chino, California.
- 42-55884 – C-60A on static display with Gary Hilton of Kingsville, Missouri.
- 42-56005 – C-60A airworthy with the Houston Wing of the Commemorative Air Force in Houston, Texas.
- 42-56036 – C-60A airworthy with the Mid America Flight Museum in Mount Pleasant, Texas.
- 43-16445 – C-60A on static display at the National Museum of the United States Air Force at Wright-Patterson Air Force Base in Dayton, Ohio.
- 43-16462 – C-60A on static display at the Planes of Fame Museum in Chino, California.
- 12473 – R5O-5 on static display at the March Field Air Museum at March Air Reserve Base (former March Air Force Base) in Riverside, California.
- 12481 – R5O-5 on static display at the Pima Air & Space Museum adjacent to Davis-Monthan Air Force Base in Tucson, Arizona.

=== Uruguay ===
- c/n 18-2349 – C-60 on static display at the Museo Aeronáutico Jaime Meregalli at Carrasco Airport near Montevideo. It was seized as a smuggler in the 1980s.

== Specifications (C-60A-5) ==
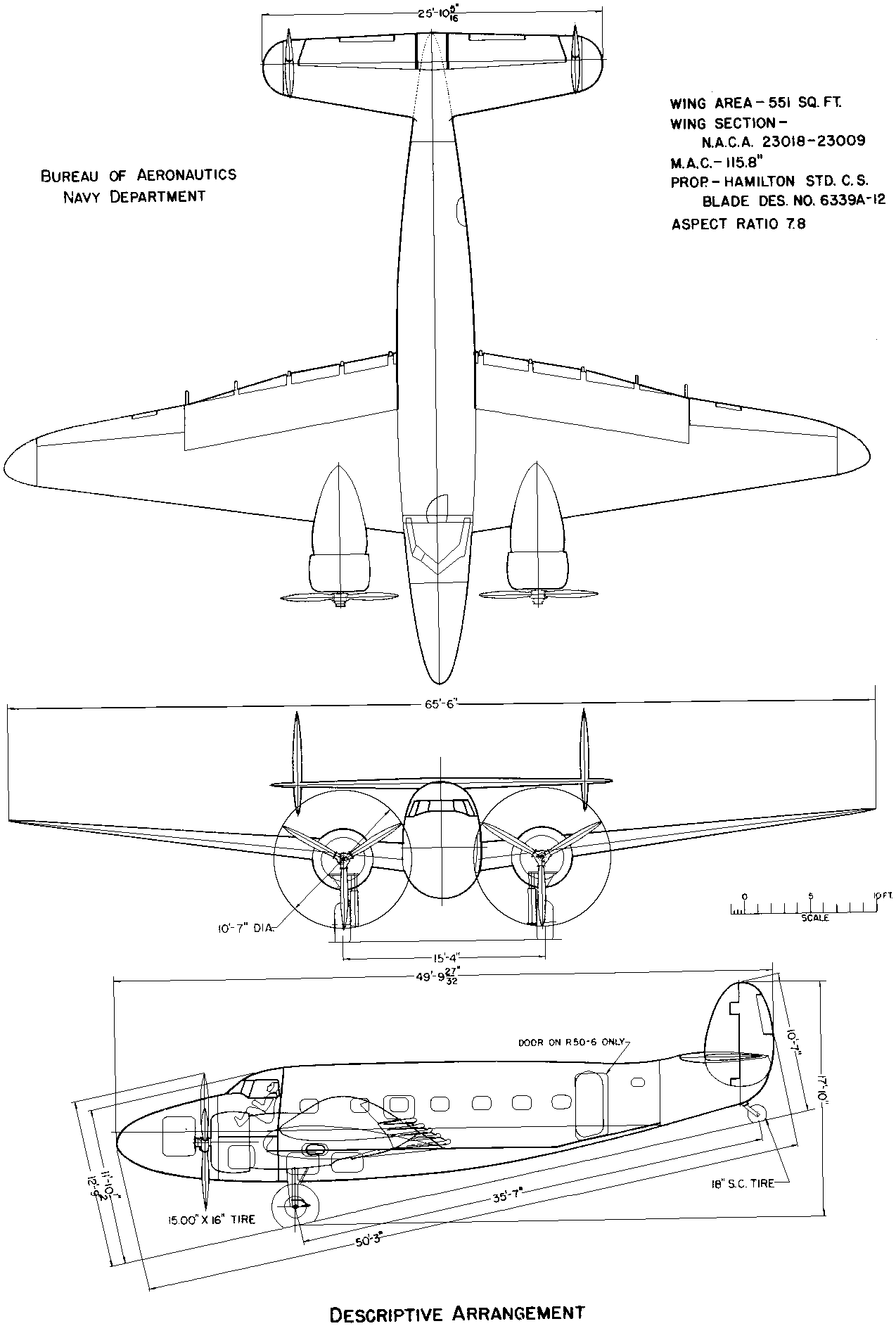
3-view line drawing of the Lockheed R5O-3 Lodestar

Data from Lockheed Aircraft since 1913.

General characteristics

- Crew: 3
- Capacity: 18 passengers
- Length: 49 ft 10 in (15.19 m)
- Wingspan: 65 ft 6 in (19.96 m)
- Height: 11 ft 10 in (3.61 m)
- Wing area: 551 sq ft (51.2 m^{2})
- Empty weight: 12,500 lb (5,670 kg)
- Gross weight: 17,500 lb (7,938 kg)
- Max takeoff weight: 21,000 lb (9,525 kg)
- Powerplant: 2 × Wright R-1820-87 nine-cylinder air-cooled radial engines, 1,200 hp (890 kW) each

Performance

- Maximum speed: 266 mph (428 km/h, 231 kn) at 1,750 ft (530 m)
- Cruise speed: 200 mph (320 km/h, 170 kn)
- Range: 2,500 mi (4,000 km, 2,200 nmi)
- Service ceiling: 30,100 ft (9,200 m)
- Climb to 10,000 ft (3,000 m): 6.6 minutes

== See also ==
Related development

- Lockheed Model 14 Super Electra
- Lockheed Ventura
- Howard 500

Related lists

- List of aircraft of World War II
- List of airliners
- List of Lockheed aircraft
- List of military aircraft of the United States
- List of United States Navy aircraft designations (pre-1962)
- List of Royal New Zealand Air Force Aircraft

== Bibliography ==
- Andrade, John. U.S. Military Aircraft Designations and Serial, since 1909. Hersham, Surrey, UK: Midland Counties Publications, 1979. ISBN 0-904597-22-9.
- Francillon, René J. (1982). Lockheed Aircraft since 1913. London: Putnam & Company. ISBN 0-370-30329-6..
- Stanaway, John C. Vega Ventura: The Operational Story of Lockheed's Lucky Star. Atglen, PA: Schiffer Publishing, 2000. ISBN 0-7643-0087-3.
- Stitt, Robert M. (July–August 2002). "Round-out". Air Enthusiast. No. 100. p. 75. ISSN 0143-5450.
- Taylor, John W. R. Jane's All The World's Aircraft 1965-66. London: Sampson Low, Marston, 1965.
