= Companhia Meridional de Transportes =

Brazilian airline

- Founded: 1944
- Commenced operations: 1945
- Ceased operations: 1946
- Key people: Álvaro Araújo

Companhia Meridional de Transportes was a Brazilian airline founded in 1944. In 1946, following the death of its owner in an air crash, the airline went bankrupt.

== History ==
Meridional was founded in 1944 and on October 4, 1945, started operating regular flights within the states of Rio de Janeiro and Espírito Santo. On December 19, 1945, one of its aircraft crashed killing all occupants, including the pilot and owner of the airline Álvaro Araújo. Months later, in March 1946, the airline declared bankruptcy.

== Destinations ==
Meridional served the following cities:

- Campos dos Goytacazes – Bartolomeu Lysandro Airport
- Rio de Janeiro – Santos Dumont Airport
- Vitória – Goiabeiras Airport

Volta Redonda was also one of its destinations, on the route Campos - Volta Redonda - Rio de Janeiro.

== Fleet ==
Meridional fleet
Aircraft	Total	Years of operation	Notes
Avro Anson Mk. II	3	1945–1946	

== Accidents and incidents ==
- 19 December 1945: an Avro Anson Mk. II registration PP-MTA crashed in the neighborhood of Itaipu, Niterói, killing all passengers and crew, including the pilot and owner of the airline, Álvaro Araújo.

== See also ==
- List of defunct airlines of Brazil
