= Universal Transportes Aéreos =

Brazilian airline

- Founded: 1947
- Commenced operations: 1948
- Ceased operations: 1948
- Key people: Ruy Presser Bello

Universal Transportes Aéreos was a Brazilian airline founded in 1947. In December 1948 it ceased operations.

== History ==
Universal was founded in the end of 1947 and operated flights between Rio de Janeiro and locations in Minas Gerais. Later it added São Paulo to the network. On December 1, 1948 it ceased operations.

== Destinations ==
Universal served the following cities:

- Belo Horizonte – Pampulha Airport
- Lavras
- Rio de Janeiro – Santos Dumont Airport
- São Lourenço – São Lourenço Airport
- São Paulo – Congonhas Airport

== Fleet ==
Universal Transportes Aéreos fleet
Aircraft	Total	Years of operation	Notes
Curtiss-Wright C-46 Commando	1	1948	
Lockheed Model 18 Lodestar	2	1948	

== See also ==
- List of defunct airlines of Brazil
