= Via Brasil Linhas Aéreas =

Brazilian airline

- Founded: 1999
- Commenced operations: 1999
- Ceased operations: 2002
- Headquarters: São Paulo, Brazil

Via Brasil Linhas Aéreas was a Brazilian charter airline founded in January 1999. It ceased operations in December 2002.

== History ==
Via Brasil was an airline established in January 1999 to operate charter flights between Southeast and Northeast regions of Brazil. In December 2002, due to technical problems related to its sole aircraft, the company was grounded and finally closed.

== Destinations ==
Via Brasil served the following destinations:

- Fortaleza – Pinto Martins International Airport
- João Pessoa – Presidente Castro Pinto International Airport
- Natal – Augusto Severo International Airport
- Porto Seguro – Porto Seguro Airport
- Recife – Guararapes/Gilberto Freyre International Airport
- Rio de Janeiro – Galeão/Antonio Carlos Jobim International Airport
- São Paulo – Guarulhos/Governador André Franco Montoro International Airport

== Fleet ==
Via Brasil Fleet
Aircraft	Total	Years of operation	Notes
Boeing 727-200	1	1999–2001	

== Airline affinity program ==
Via Brasil did not have an airline affinity program.

== See also ==
- List of defunct airlines of Brazil
