= Sol Linhas Aéreas =

Domestic airline based in Brazil

Sol Linhas Aéreas Ltda.
| IATA | ICAO | Call sign |
|---|---|---|
| – | SBA | SOL |
- Founded: 2008
- Commenced operations: 2009
- Ceased operations: 2012
- Operating bases: Toledo
- Frequent-flyer program: Cliente Fidelidade Sol
- Fleet size: 1
- Headquarters: Cascavel, Brazil
- Key people: Marcos Solano Vale, Director
- Website: voesol.com.br

Sol Linhas Aéreas Ltda. was a domestic airline based in Cascavel, Brazil.

== History ==
The airline was founded in 2008. The company's main objective is to operate in the market of scheduled regional flights, connecting the city of Cascavel to other cities within Paraná and neighboring States. It was founded in 2008 and the first flight was operated on October 12, 2009.

Sol suspended its regular operations in December 2010 and restarted them on March 28, 2011. According to the National Civil Aviation Agency of Brazil (ANAC) in September 2011 Sol had 0.01% of the domestic market share in terms of passengers per kilometre flown. However, on November 28, 2011, all flights were suspended again due to lack of infrastructure in the airports that Sol operates. The airline expected to resume flights in April 2012.

== Destinations ==
As of November 2011 Sol Linhas Aéreas operated scheduled services to the following destinations:

- (Paraná (state)) Curitiba (CWB)
- (Paraná (state)) Toledo (TOW)
- (Paraná (state)) Umuarama (UMU)

Terminated destination: Cascavel

== Fleet ==
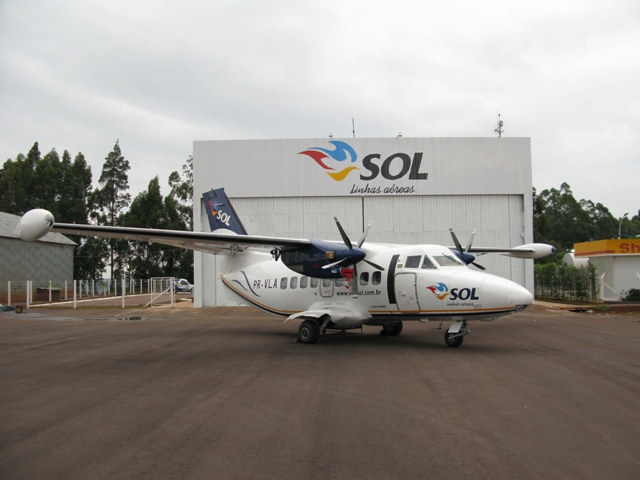
Let L-410 at Cascavel Airport

As of December 2011 the fleet of Sol Linhas Aéreas included the following aircraft:

Sol Linhas Aéreas fleet
| Aircraft | Total | Orders | Passengers (Y) | Introduced | Notes |
|---|---|---|---|---|---|
| Let L-410 Turbolet | 1 | – | 19 | 2009 | |

== Airline affinity program ==
Cliente Fidelidade Sol is Sol's Frequent Flyer Program. Points can be used for free flights with Sol.

== See also ==
- List of defunct airlines of Brazil
