= Promodal Transportes Aéreos =

Brazilian cargo airline

IATA	ICAO	Call sign
-	GPT	Promodal
- Founded: 2003
- Ceased operations: 2004
- Fleet size: one McDonnell Douglas DC-8
- Parent company: Grupo GPT
- Headquarters: São Paulo, Brazil

Promodal Transportes Aéreos was a short-lived cargo airline based in São Paulo, Brazil.

== Code data ==
- ICAO Code: GPT
- Callsign: Promodal

== History ==
The airline was established in 2003 and was wholly owned by Grupo GPT. Operations ceased in 2004, and the company was subsequently dissolved.

== Fleet ==
The Promodal fleet consisted of one McDonnell Douglas DC-8 aircraft.

== See also ==
- List of defunct airlines of Brazil
