= Carolina (Maranhão) Airport =

Brigadeiro Lysias Augusto Rodrigues Airport Aeroporto Brigadeiro Lysias Augusto Rodrigues
- IATA: CLN; ICAO: SBCI; LID: MA0003

Summary
- Airport type: Public
- Serves: Carolina
- Time zone: BRT (UTC−03:00)
- Elevation AMSL: 172 m (564 ft)
- Coordinates: 07°19′14″S 047°27′31″W

Map
- Location in Brazil

Runways
Direction	Length		Surface
Direction	m	ft	Surface
11/29	1,800	5,905	Asphalt
- Sources: ANAC, DECEA

Brigadeiro Lysias Augusto Rodrigues Airport (IATA: CLN, ICAO: SBCI) is the airport serving Carolina, Brazil. It is named after Brigadier Lysias Augusto Rodrigues (1896-1957), one of the founding figures of the Brazilian Air Force, and expert in Geopolitics.

== Access ==
The airport is located 2 km (1 mi) from downtown Carolina.

== See also ==
- List of airports in Brazil
