= BETA Cargo =

Brazilian cargo airline

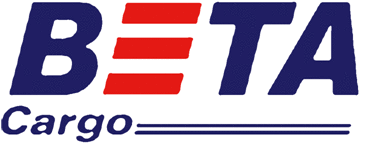
IATA	ICAO	Call sign
GB	BET	BETA CARGO
- Founded: 1990
- Ceased operations: July 10, 2012
- Hubs: Guarulhos International Airport
- Fleet size: 5
- Destinations: 9
- Parent company: Grupo BETA
- Website: BETA Cargo

BETA Cargo (Brazilian Express Transportes Aéreos) was a cargo airline based in Brazil. It operated international cargo charters in the Americas. Its main base was Guarulhos International Airport, São Paulo.

== History ==
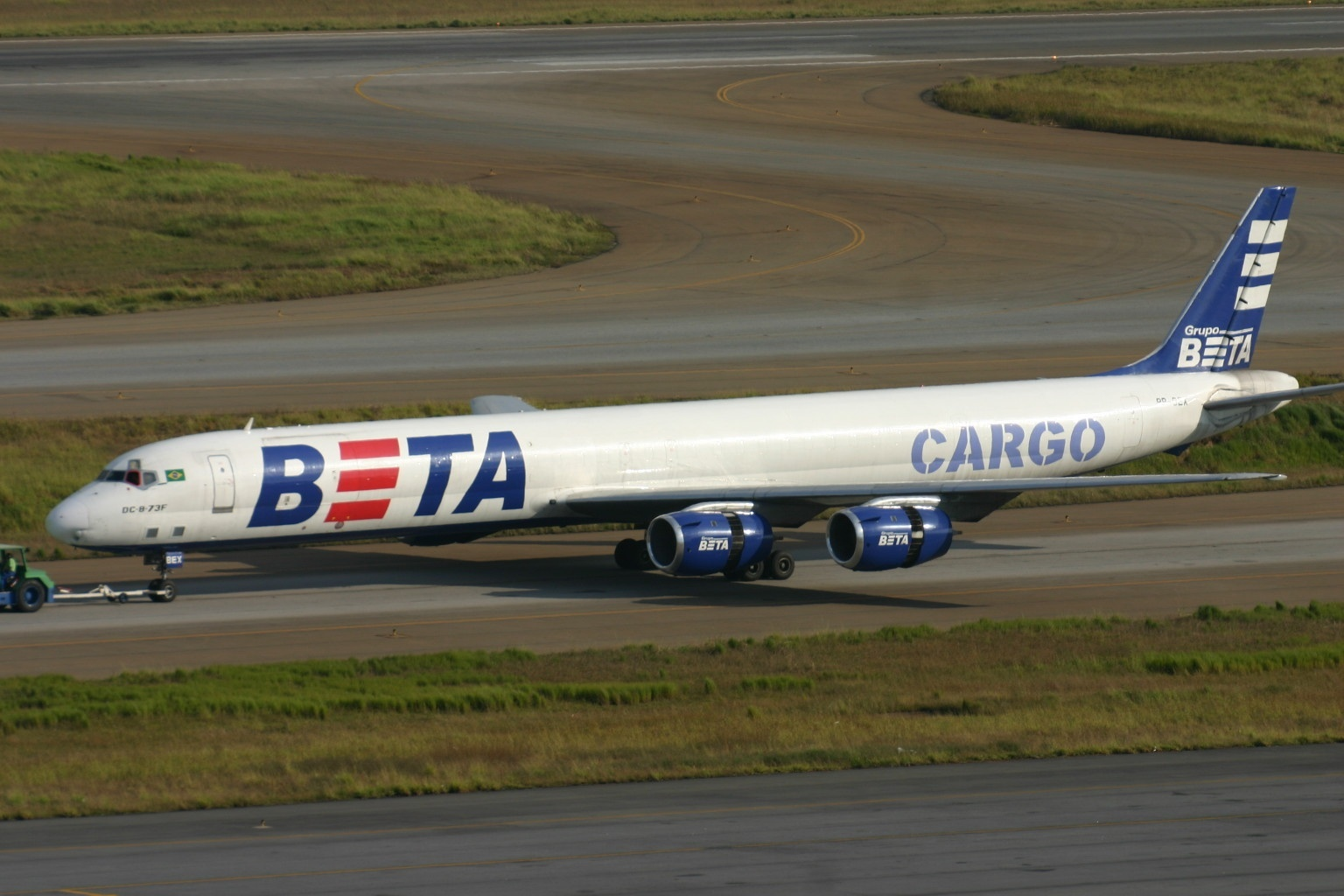
BETA Douglas DC-8

The airline was established in 1990 as Brasair Transportes Aéreos. On July 10, 2012 Beta lost its operational license.

== Fleet ==
BETA fleet
Aircraft	Out Service	Orders	Notes
Boeing 707-320C	1	—	
Douglas DC-8-73CF	4	—	
Total	5	—	

== Accidents and incidents ==
- On October 23, 2004 a BETA Boeing 707 on a Cargo flight from Manaus-Eduardo Gomes International Airport, Brazil to São Paulo-Guarulhos International Airport, Brazil aborted take-off from Manaus due to a "loud noise". The aircraft afterwards started tilting to the right. It appeared the landing gear ruptured the right wing. The 37-year-old aircraft (registration PP-BSE) was written off.

== See also ==
- List of defunct airlines of Brazil
