= JetSul =

Jet Sul
- Jet Sul logo
- Founded: 1993
- Ceased operations: 2003
- Operating bases: Afonso Pena International Airport (Curitiba)
- Fleet size: See Fleet below
- Headquarters: Curitiba, Paraná, Brazil
- Key people: José Rodrigues Cordeiro
- Website: www.jetsul.com

Jet Sul is a business that was founded in 1993 by José Rodrigues Cordeiro. Initially it offered charter services and currently it continues to operate as a charter airline for the needs of executives and corporations. All the aircraft are configured with business interiors. The Company ceased operation 2003.

== Fleet ==
- Dassault Falcon 10
- IAI Westwind II
- Raytheon BeechJet
- Embraer EMB 110 Bandeirante
- Piper Seneca III
- Beechcraft King Air 350
