= Carolina, Maranhão =

Coordinates: 7.33278°S 47.4689°W

Carolina
- Municipality
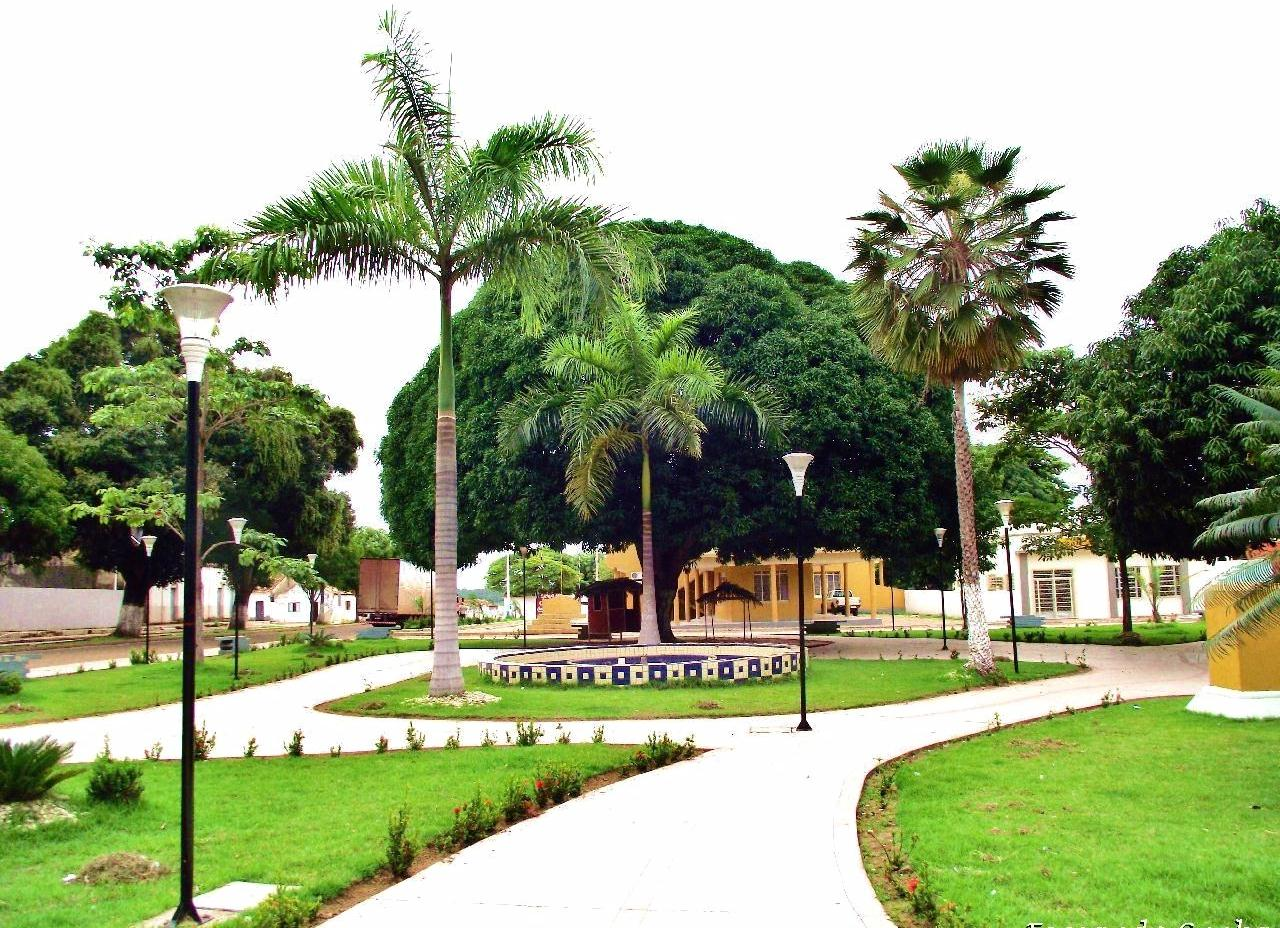

- Flag Coat of arms
- Interactive map of Carolina
- Country: Brazil
- Region: Nordeste
- State: Maranhão
- Mesoregion: Sul Maranhense

Population (2020)
  - Total: 24,165
- Time zone: UTC−3 (BRT)

Carolina is a municipality in the state of Maranhão in the Northeast region of Brazil.

Carolina is served by Brig. Lysias Augusto Rodrigues Airport.

== Climate ==
Carolina features a tropical savanna climate (Köppen: Aw) characterized by hot temperatures and distinct wet and dry seasons. The city experiences a wet season from October to April, with January through March being the rainiest period. The dry season is from June to September, and experiences little rain.

Climate data for Carolina (1991–2020)
Month	Jan	Feb	Mar	Apr	May	Jun	Jul	Aug	Sep	Oct	Nov	Dec	Year
Mean daily maximum °C (°F)	31.3 (88.3)	31.5 (88.7)	31.6 (88.9)	32.1 (89.8)	32.9 (91.2)	33.9 (93.0)	35.0 (95.0)	36.4 (97.5)	36.3 (97.3)	34.2 (93.6)	32.4 (90.3)	31.6 (88.9)	33.3 (91.9)
Daily mean °C (°F)	26.1 (79.0)	26.2 (79.2)	26.3 (79.3)	26.8 (80.2)	27.1 (80.8)	27.0 (80.6)	27.4 (81.3)	28.7 (83.7)	29.4 (84.9)	28.1 (82.6)	27.1 (80.8)	26.5 (79.7)	27.2 (81.0)
Mean daily minimum °C (°F)	22.6 (72.7)	22.7 (72.9)	23.0 (73.4)	23.1 (73.6)	22.7 (72.9)	21.2 (70.2)	20.4 (68.7)	21.5 (70.7)	23.3 (73.9)	23.3 (73.9)	23.1 (73.6)	22.8 (73.0)	22.5 (72.5)
Average precipitation mm (inches)	303.0 (11.93)	289.0 (11.38)	293.0 (11.54)	206.3 (8.12)	91.6 (3.61)	13.1 (0.52)	7.4 (0.29)	9.0 (0.35)	37.5 (1.48)	116.9 (4.60)	174.3 (6.86)	231.0 (9.09)	1,772.1 (69.77)
Average precipitation days (≥ 1.0 mm)	17.4	16.8	17.6	13.0	6.7	1.2	0.7	0.8	3.3	7.8	10.1	13.3	108.7
Average relative humidity (%)	83.4	83.6	84.3	82.5	76.9	65.8	55.4	47.9	54.3	69.4	78.1	81.5	71.9
Average dew point °C (°F)	23.4 (74.1)	23.5 (74.3)	23.8 (74.8)	23.9 (75.0)	23.3 (73.9)	20.9 (69.6)	18.6 (65.5)	17.7 (63.9)	19.8 (67.6)	22.4 (72.3)	23.3 (73.9)	23.5 (74.3)	22.0 (71.6)
Mean monthly sunshine hours	146.1	133.7	149.2	176.7	235.2	285.7	307.4	298.7	233.0	176.3	147.4	141.7	2,431.1
Source: NOAA

== See also ==
- List of municipalities in Maranhão
