= Vale do Aço Regional Airport =

Vale do Aço Regional Airport Aeroporto Regional do Vale do Aço

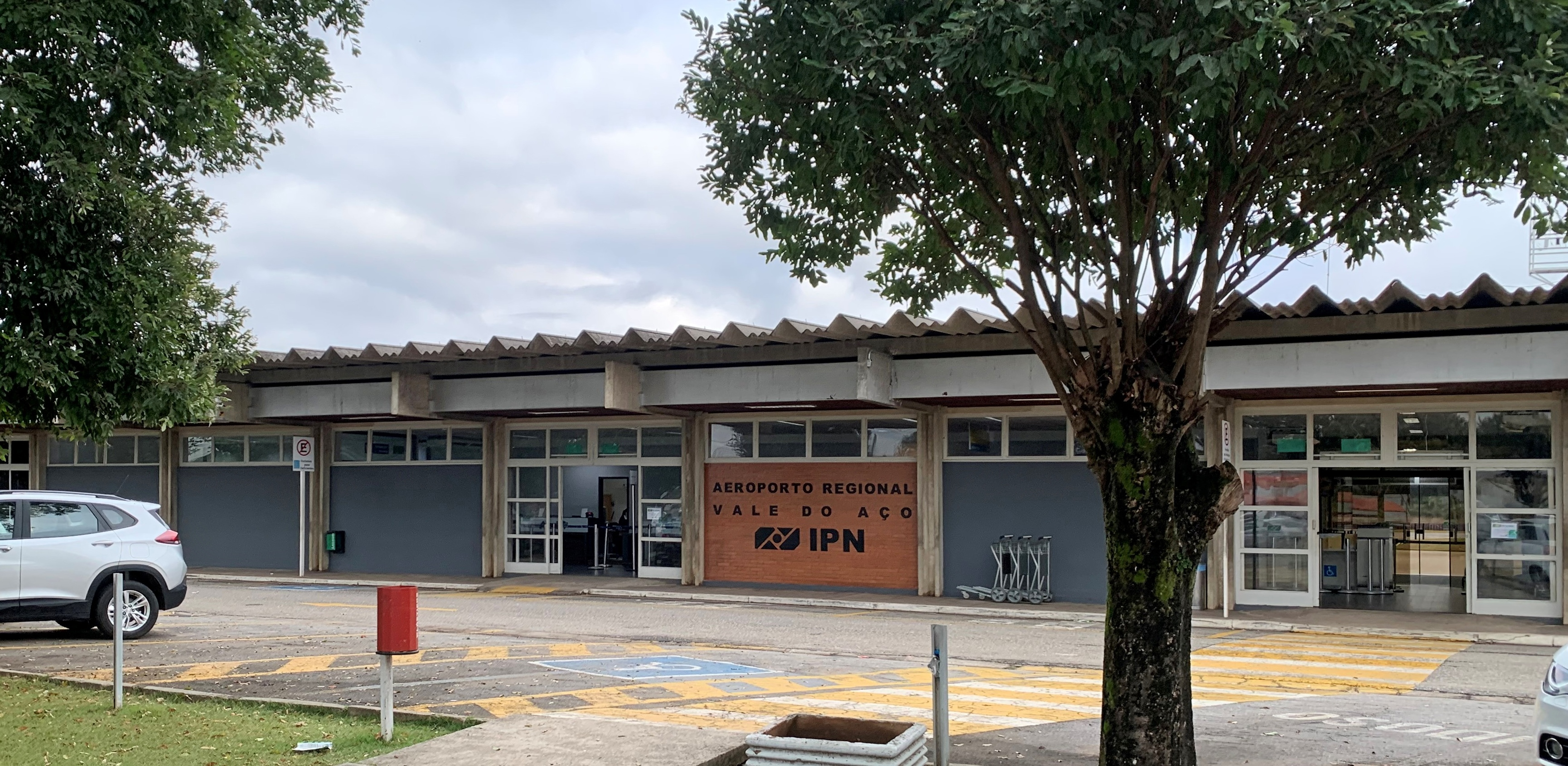
- Passenger terminal of the Vale do Aço Regional Airport
- IATA: IPN; ICAO: SBIP; LID: MG0007

Summary
- Airport type: Public
- Operator: Usiminas (1959–2016); Socicam (2016–2020); Infraero (2020–present)
- Serves: Ipatinga
- Location: Santana do Paraíso, Brazil
- Time zone: BRT (UTC−03:00)
- Elevation AMSL: 240 m (790 ft)
- Coordinates: 19°28′14″S 042°29′17″W
- Website: www4.infraero.gov.br/aeroporto-ipatinga/

Map
- Location in Brazil IPN (Brazil)

Runways
Direction	Length		Surface
Direction	m	ft	Surface
05/23	2,004	6,575	Asphalt

Statistics (2025)
- Passengers: 134,302 ▼24%
- Aircraft Operations: 5,000 ▼10%
- Metric tonnes of cargo: 170 ▼25%
- Statistics: Infraero; Sources: Airport Website, ANAC, DECEA

Vale do Aço Regional Airport (IATA: IPN, ICAO: SBIP), formerly known as Usiminas Airport, is the airport serving Ipatinga, Brazil, located in the adjoining municipality of Santana do Paraíso.

It is operated by Infraero.

== History ==
Formerly owned and managed by the steel manufacturer Usiminas, in 2012 the administration began to be conducted in partnership with Socicam. However, in March 2016 the concessionary became temporarily the sole administrator. On August 7, 2020, the State of Minas Gerais signed a contract of operation with Infraero.

As result of structural problems on the runway, on February 20, 2019, ANAC suspended all operations at the airport, so that the concessionary could solve the problems. The airport was reopened on December 1, 2021.

== Airlines and destinations ==
Airlines	Destinations
Azul Brazilian Airlines	Belo Horizonte–Confins

== Access ==
The airport is located 4 km (2 mi) from downtown Santana do Paraíso and 5 km (3 mi) from Ipatinga.

== See also ==
- List of airports in Brazil
