= Goiânia International Airport =

Airport in Brazil

Goiânia/Santa Genoveva International Airport Aeroporto Internacional de Goiânia/Santa Genoveva

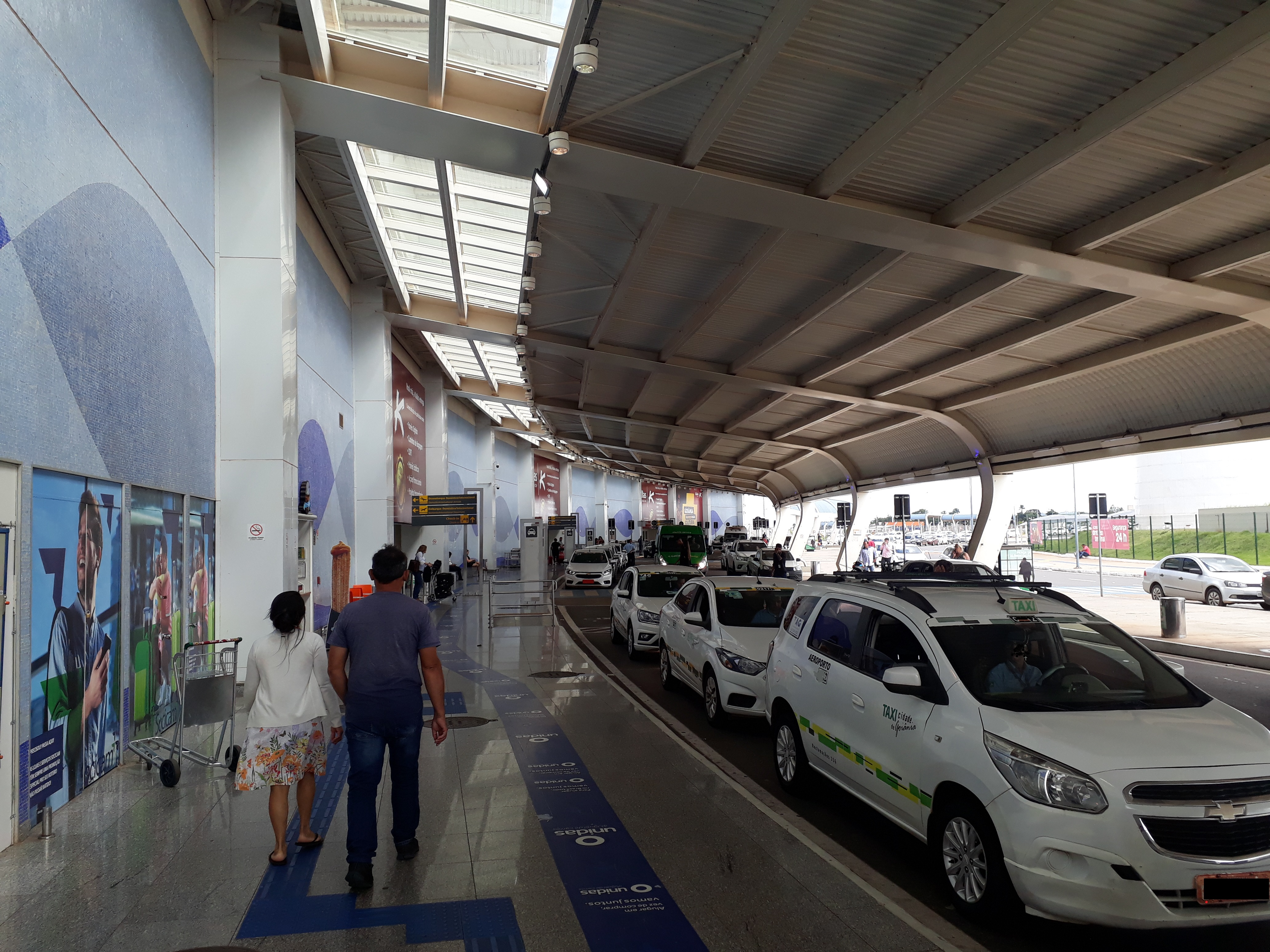
- IATA: GYN; ICAO: SBGO; LID: GO0001

Summary
- Airport type: Public
- Operator: Infraero (1974–2021); Motiva (2021–2026); ASUR (2026–present)
- Serves: Goiânia
- Opened: 1955
- Time zone: BRT (UTC−03:00)
- Elevation AMSL: 748 m (2,454 ft)
- Coordinates: 16°37′57″S 049°13′16″W
- Website: aeroportos.motiva.com.br/goiania-go/

Map
- Location in Brazil

Runways
Direction	Length		Surface
Direction	m	ft	Surface
14/32	2,500	7,500	Asphalt

Statistics (2025)
- Passengers: 3,856,638 ▲22%
- Aircraft Operations: 57,605 ▲11%
- Statistics: Motiva; Sources: Airport Website, ANAC, DECEA

Goiânia/Santa Genoveva International Airport (IATA: GYN, ICAO: SBGO) is the airport serving Goiânia, Brazil.

It is operated by ASUR.

== History ==
The airport was commissioned in 1955, although operations started a few years earlier. In 1974, Infraero started to operate the airport.

In 2010, the government of the state of Goiás, in order to encourage tourism and aviation, reduced the tax on petrol from 15% to 3%. After such a reduction, there was some interest from airlines to build a hub at Santa Genoveva Airport, but operational limitations prevented the immediate implementation of such a plan.

The old passenger terminal was capable of handling 600,000 passengers/year, but in its last few years it had been operating beyond its capacity; in 2015, it handled more than 5 times its capacity. On May 9, 2016, a new passenger terminal located on the opposite side of the old and across the runway was opened. It is capable of handling 6,3 million passengers/year. This new terminal has 32 check-in counters and 8 jetways, apart from the usual amenities such as stores and restaurants.

Previously operated by Infraero, on April 7, 2021, CCR won a 30-year concession to operate the airport. On April 26, 2025 CCR was rebranded as Motiva.

On November 18, 2025 the entire airports portfolio of Motiva was sold to the Mexican airport operator ASUR. Motiva will cease to operate airports. The transaction was completed on August 31, 2026.

== Airlines and destinations ==
Airlines	Destinations
Azul Brazilian Airlines	Belo Horizonte–Confins, Campinas, Maceió, Palmas, Porto Seguro, Recife; Seasonal: Fortaleza, João Pessoa, Natal, Porto Alegre
Gol Linhas Aéreas	Brasília (ends 31 January 2027), Rio de Janeiro–Galeão, Salvador da Bahia, São Paulo–Congonhas, São Paulo–Guarulhos
LATAM Brasil	Brasília, São Paulo–Congonhas, São Paulo–Guarulhos; Seasonal: Fortaleza, Maceió

== Statistics ==
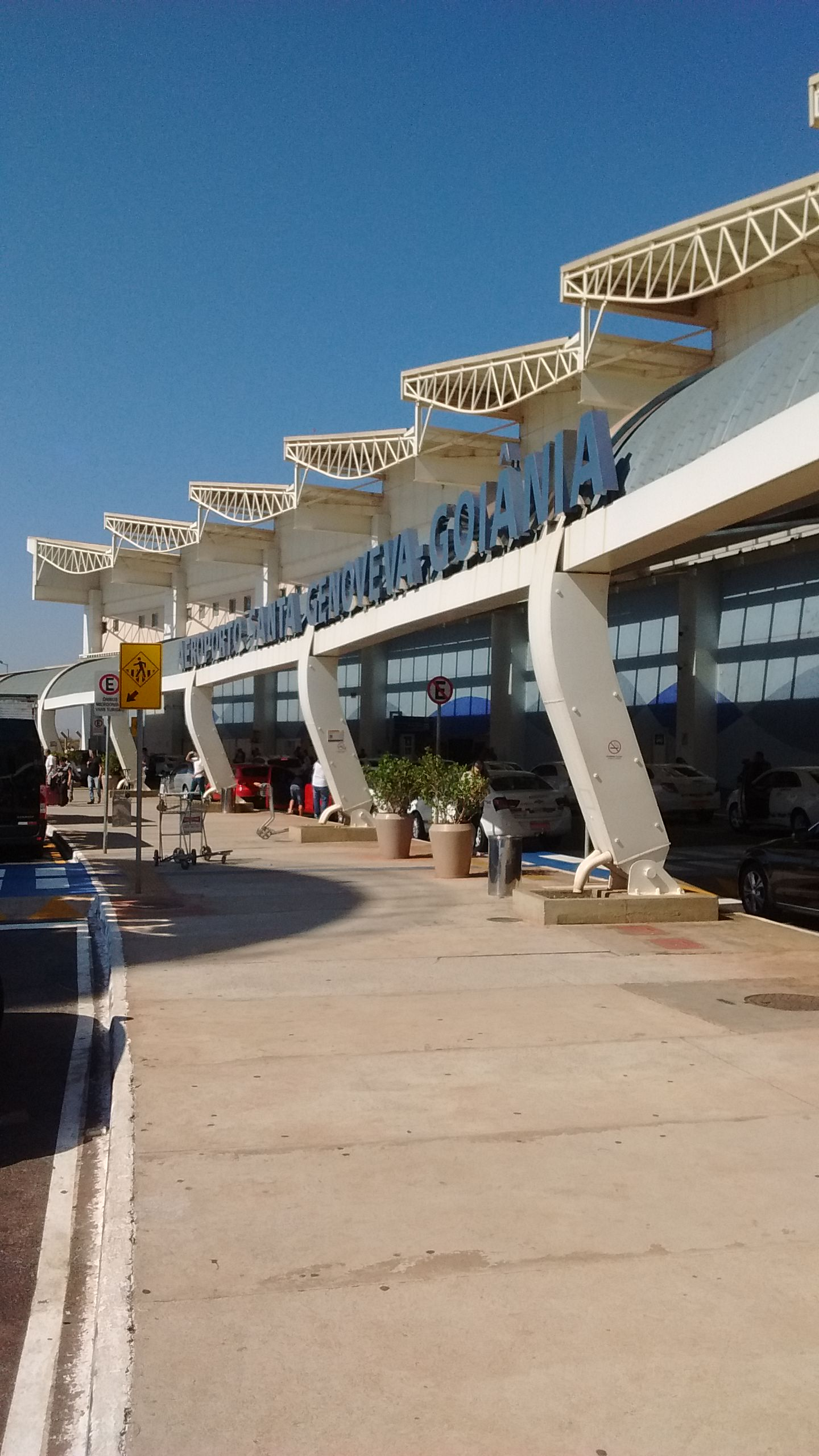
Terminal land-side

Following are the number of passenger, aircraft and cargo movements at the airport, according to Infraero (2007-2021) and Motiva (2022-2025) reports:

Year	Passenger	Aircraft	Cargo (t)
2025	3,856,638 ▲22%	57,605 ▲11%	
2024	3,157,061 ▼1%	52,085 ▼5%	
2023	3,181,909	54,901	
2022^{a}	1,964,763	44,492	
2021	2,100,107 ▲42%	49,981 ▲38%	7,905 ▲109%
2020	1,477,049 ▼55%	36,116 ▼35%	3,776 ▼59%
2019	3,302,785 ▲2%	55,861 ▼16%	9,169 ▼2%
2018	3,224,837 ▲4%	66,855 ▲12%	9,380 ▲24%
2017	3,088,274 ▲2%	59,879 ▲1%	7,563 ▲31%
2016	3,016,798 ▼9%	59,142 ▼9%	5,758 ▼15%
2015	3,312,290 ▼2%	65,019 ▼1%	6,736 ▼8%
2014	3,363,192 ▲12%	65,678 ▲6%	7,301 ▼5%
2013	3,000,592 ▼2%	61,847 ▼13%	7,694 ▼3%
2012	3,076,858 ▲10%	71,030 ▲1%	7,945 ▲11%
2011	2,802,002 ▲19%	70,128 ▲8%	7,174 ▲41%
2010	2,348,648 ▲33%	64,678 ▲23%	5,097 ▼9%
2009	1,772,424 ▲14%	52,584 ▲13%	5,645 ▼11%
2008	1,554,000	46,564 ▲8%	6,370 ▼4%
2007	1,546,476	43,136	6,605

Note:
^{a}: 2022 series provided by CCR is incomplete, lacking data for the months of January, February and part of March.

== Accidents and incidents ==
- 22 February 1975: VASP Boeing 737-2A1 registration PP-SMU en route from Goiânia to Brasília was hijacked by 1 person who demanded ransom. The hijacker was taken down.
- 29 September 1988: VASP Boeing 737-300 registration PP-SNT operating Flight 375 en route from Belo Horizonte-Confins to Rio de Janeiro was hijacked by 1 person who wanted to force a crash on the Palácio do Planalto, the official presidential workplace in Brasília. The pilot convinced the hijacker to divert to Goiânia where an emergency landing was made. The hijack ended with 1 victim.
- 14 January 2011: a Beechcraft B200 Super King Air registration PR-ART belonging to CMN Construtora Meio Norte while on a VOR approach to Goiânia-Santa Genoveva Airport runway 32 in heavy rain, impacted Santo Antônio Hill, 11 km short of the runway. The pilot and five passengers were fatally injured.

== Access ==
The airport is located 8 km (5 mi) from downtown Goiânia.

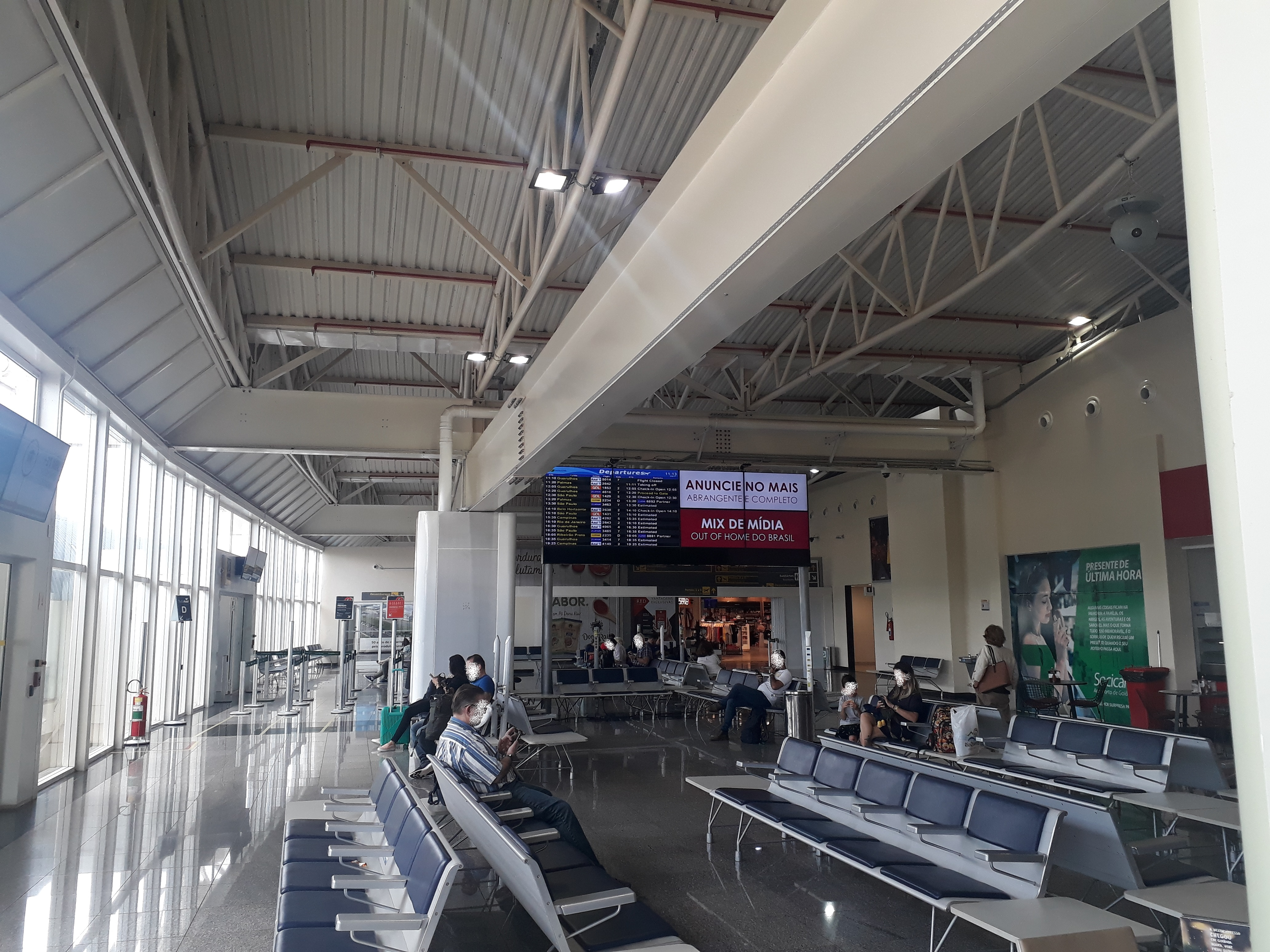

== See also ==
- List of airports in Brazil
