= List of preserved Douglas aircraft =

List of Douglas aircraft in preservation

This article is a list of aircraft that were manufactured by the Douglas Aircraft Company and are in preservation.

== List ==
=== DC-6 ===
| Aircraft | Type | Photograph | Build date | First flight | Last flight | Operator | Location | Status | Notes | Ref. |
|---|---|---|---|---|---|---|---|---|---|---|
| G-APSA | DC-6A | | 1958 | June 13th, 1958 | 1971 | Maritime Central Airways; Eagle Airways Ltd.; Cunard Eagle Airways Ltd.; British Eagle International Airlines; Saudi Arabian Airlines; Yemen Airways | GJD Engineering, St Athan, Vale of Glamorgan, Wales | Awaiting rebuild for static display | | |
| OE-LDM/N996DM | DC-6B | | 1958 | October 24th, 1958 | July 11th, 2013 | Jugoslovenski Aerotransport; Yugoslav Air Force; Zambian Air Force; Namibia Commercial Aviation; Air Namibia; The Flying Bulls GmbH (Red Bull); Aircraft Guaranty Corporation; The Flying Bulls GmbH (Red Bull); Aircraft Guaranty Corporation Trustee; The Flying Bulls GmbH (Red Bull) | Salzburg, Austria | Operational | | |
| TF-IUB | DC-6A | | 1956 | May 1956 | 1981 | United Air Lines; Fred Olsen Air Transport; Iscargo Iceland | Flugsfanid Museum at Keflavík International Airport Reykjavík, Iceland | On static display | Nose only | |

=== DC-7 ===
| Aircraft | Type | Photograph | Build date | First flight | Last flight | Operator | Location | Status | Notes | Ref. |
|---|---|---|---|---|---|---|---|---|---|---|
| N381AA | DC-7BF | | 1956 | March 23rd, 1956 | 1969 | American Airlines; Zantop International Airlines; Californian Airmotive; Universal Airlines | Epic Flight Academy in New Smyrna Beach, Volusia County, Florida | On static display | | |
| N4887C | DC-7B | | 1957 | November 25th, 1957 | December 7th, 2013 | Delta Air Lines; BMR Aviation; Emerald Shillelagh Travel Club; C. M. Belew; International Air Response Inc.; T&G Aviation Inc.; International Air Response Inc. | Delta Flight Museum in Atlanta, Georgia | On static display | | |
| EC-BBT | DC-7C | | 1958 | November 4th, 1958 | March 1978 | Swissair; SAS Scandinavian Airlines; Japan Air Lines; S. A. Spantax | Gran Canaria | On static display | | |
| N51701 | DC-7B | | 1955 | July 18th, 1955 | 1993 | Pan American-Grace Airways; Argonaut; Maricopa Dust and Spray; Air Tankers Inc.; United States Forest Services; T&G Aviation Inc. | Pima Air and Space Museum in Tucson, Arizona | On static display | | |

=== DC-8 ===
| Aircraft | Type | Photograph | Build date | First flight | Last flight | Operator | Location | Status | Notes | Ref. |
|---|---|---|---|---|---|---|---|---|---|---|
| JA8001 | DC-8-32 | | April 18th, 1960 | July 16th, 1960 | June 1974 | Japan Air Lines | Haneda Airport, Tokyo, Japan | On static display | Named "Fuji" by Japan Air Lines | |
| N220RB | DC-8-21 | | 1958 | Jan 1959 | April 15, 1994 | Douglas Aircraft Company; United Airlines; Project Orbis | Chinese Aviation Museum in Datangshan, China | On static display | Named "Mainliner Capt. Ralph J. Johnson" by United Airlines | |
| F-RAFE | DC-8-33 | | 1961 | Feb 1961 | July 30, 2001 | Transports Aériens Intercontinentaux; Union de Transports Aériens; Armée de l'Air | Musée de l'Air at the Paris–Le Bourget Airport in Paris, France | On static display | | |
| N8066U | DC-8-52 | | 1966 | April 1966 | 1980 | United Airlines | California Science Center in Exposition Park, Los Angeles, California | On static display | | |
| N799AL | DC-8-62CF | | 1968 | February 1968 | May 17, 2013 | SAS Scandinavian Airlines; Scanair; Arista International Airlines; Northeastern International Airways; Thai Airways; Royal Thai Air Force; Arrow Air; Hawaiian Airlines; Air Marshall Islands; Arrow Air; Zantop International Airlines; Air Transport International | Naval Air Museum Barbers Point at Kalaeloa Airport in Kapolei, Hawaii | On static display | Named "Skjold Viking" by SAS Scandinavian Airlines. Named "Turid Viking" by Scanair. Named "Maro" by Arista International Airlines | |
| JA8048 | DC-8-61 | | 1971 | March 1971 | September 17, 1982 | Japan Air Lines | Shanghai Aerospace Enthusiasts Center | On static display | Involved as Japan Air Lines Flight 792 | |
| 9J-MKK | DC-8-62AF | | 1968 | December 1968 | 2008 | Japan Air Lines; United Aviation Services; Evergreen International Airlines; Trans Continental Airlines; MK Airlines | Kenneth Kaunda International Airport in Lusaka, Zambia | On static display | Named "Wakasa" by Japan Air Lines | |
