= List of preserved McDonnell Douglas aircraft =

List of McDonnell Douglas aircraft in preservation

This article is a list of aircraft that were manufactured by McDonnell Douglas and are in preservation.

== Currently preserved ==
=== DC-9 ===
Aircraft	Type	Photograph	Build date	First flight	Last flight	Operator	Location	Status	Notes	Ref.
CF-TLL	DC-9-32		1968	1968	2002	Air Canada	Canada Aviation and Space Museum in Ottawa, Ontario, Canada.	On static display		
PK-GNC	DC-9-32		December 18, 1970	February 4, 1971	1993	Garuda Indonesia	GMF hangar in Soekarno-Hatta Airport	On static display		
PK-GNT	DC-9-32		1979	May 16, 1979	June 21, 1993	Garuda Indonesia	Transportation Museum in Taman Mini Indonesia Indah in Jakarta, Indonesia.	On static display		
MM62012	DC-9-32		1973	January 1974	May 2001	Italian Air Force	Volandia in Somma Lombardo, Varese	On static display		
XA-JEB	DC-9-32		1969	February 1969	August 31, 2004	Playboy Enterprises; Linea Aeropostal Venezolana; Aeroméxico	Cadereyta de Montes, Querétaro, Mexico	On static display		
N675MC	DC-9-51		1975	August 25, 1975	November 26, 2013	Austrian Airlines; Muse Air; TranStar Airlines; Eastern Air Lines; Continental Air Lines; Northwest Airlines; Delta Air Lines	Delta Flight Museum at Hartsfield–Jackson Atlanta International Airport in Atlanta, Georgia	On static display		

=== DC-10 ===
Aircraft	Type	Photograph	Build date	First flight	Last flight	Operator	Location	Status	Notes	Ref.
9G-ANB	DC-10-30		1976	December 1976	2005	McDonnell Douglas; Thai Airways; SAS Scandinavian Airlines; Malaysia Airlines; World Airways; Malaysia Airlines; Tunisair; Malaysia Airlines; Ghana Airways	Accra, Ghana	On static display and in use as the La Tante DC10 Restaurant.	Named Phimara by Thai Airways between March 1977 and January 1987 Named Chaiprakarn by Thai Airways in January 1987. Named Godfred Viking by SAS Scandinavian Airlines.	
N220AU	DC-10-10		1977	June 1977	November 3, 2016	Laker Airways; American Trans Air; Cal Air International; Novair; Project Orbis	Pima Air & Space Museum in Tucson, Arizona.	On static display	Named Southern Belle by Laker Airways Named City of Indianapolis by American Trans Air	
Z-AVT	DC-10-30		1978	January 1979	2010	British Caledonian; Continental Airlines; DAS Air Cargo; Avient Aviation	8°39'44.89"S 115°10'1.18"E	On static display	Named David Livingstone - The Scottish Explorer by British Caledonian. Named Victor Trimble by Avient Aviation. Broken up Mar 2012 at CGK. Preserved Badung, Bali, Indonesia 2014, on the roof of the Gate 88 Nightclub & Bar, rear fuselage and tail only (8°39'44.89"S 115°10'1.18"E)	
F-GTLY	DC-10-30		1976	April 29th 1976	February 6th 2003	Air New Zealand; Malaysia Airlines; National Airlines; Lan chile; SAS Scandinavian Airlines; Scanair; Air Outre Mer; AOM French Airlines; Air Lib	José Martí International Airport, Havana, Cuba	Used as a Training aid	Airframe is preserved at José Martí International Airport, Havana, Cuba as a training aid since 03/2003 A group of Aviation enthusiasts In New Zealand Called "Bring our Birds home" want to bring this aircraft back to New Zealand to have it preserved in its original Air New Zealand colors at Wanaka's National Toy And transport museum	

=== KC-10 Extender ===
Aircraft	Type	Photograph	Build date	First flight	Last flight	Operator	Location	Status	Notes
84-0191	DC-10-KCA	Aircraft	1984	04/1985	April 15th 2024	United States Air Force	National Museum of the US Air Force at Dayton Wright-Patterson AFB	On Static Display	400th DC-10 Series Aircraft Built

== Formerly preserved, scrapped during preservation ==
This is a list of aircraft that were preserved, but would be scrapped during preservation due to costs, lack of spare parts or their condition that they were in, though are considered preserved:

=== DC-9 ===
Aircraft	Type	Photograph	Build date	First flight	Last flight	Operator	Last seen	Scrap date	Notes	Ref.
N779NC	DC-9-51		1968	1968	2002	Delta Air Lines	Carolinas Aviation Museum, Charlotte, North Carolina	January 2017		

== See also ==
- List of preserved Douglas aircraft
