= Douglas DC-8 =

American jet airliner family

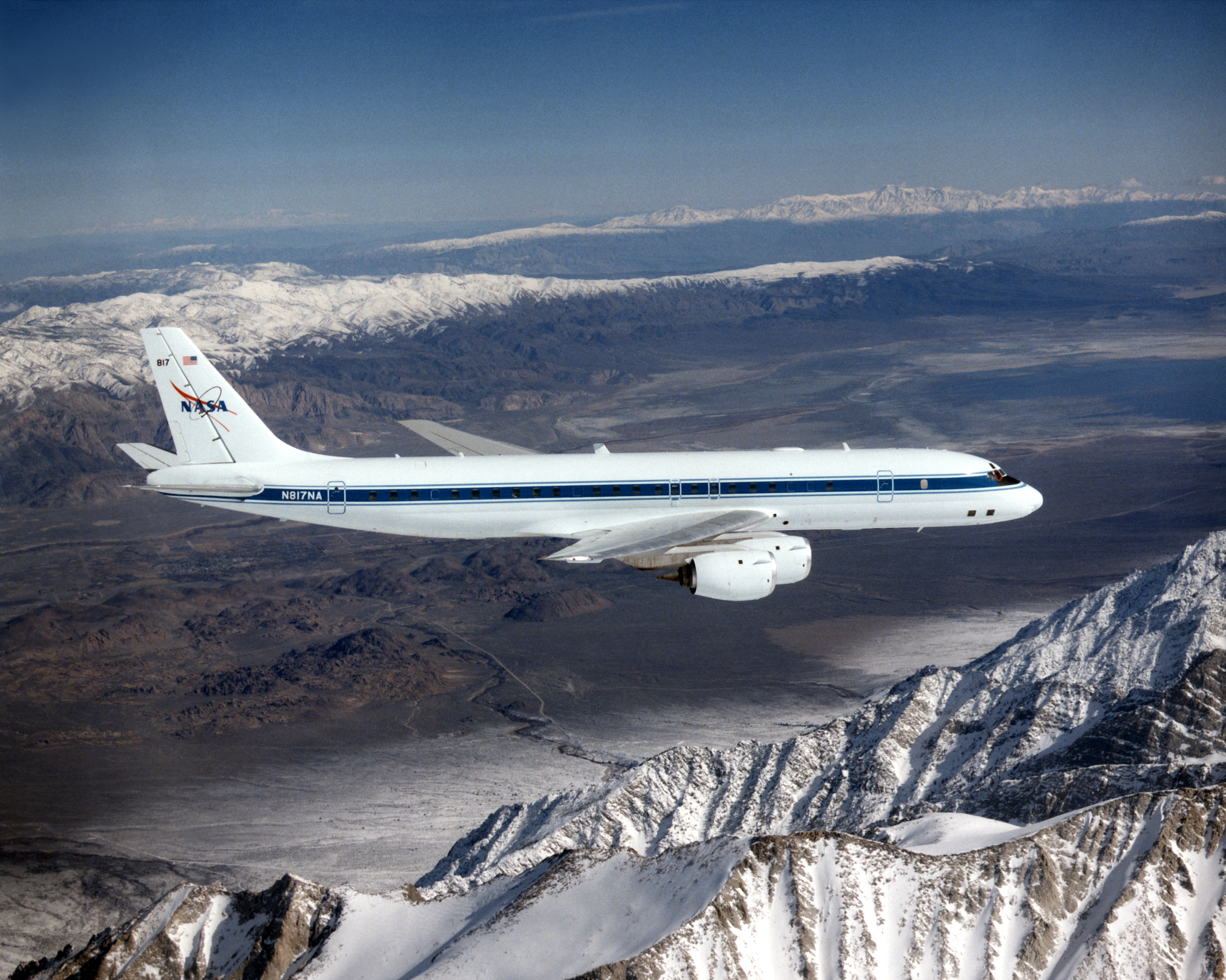
- DC-8-72 over the Sierra Nevada Mountains of California in 1998. This aircraft, once operated by NASA, was re-engined with CFM56s.

General information
- Type: Narrow-body airliner
- National origin: United States
- Manufacturer: Douglas Aircraft Company (1958–1967); McDonnell Douglas (1967–1972)
- Status: In limited cargo service
- Primary users: United Airlines (historical) UPS Airlines (historical); Delta Air Lines (historical); Trans Air Cargo Service
- Number built: 556

History
- Manufactured: 1958–1972
- Introduction date: September 18, 1959, with Delta Air Lines and United Airlines
- First flight: May 30, 1958

The Douglas DC-8 (sometimes McDonnell Douglas DC-8) is an early long-range narrow-body jetliner designed and produced by the American Douglas Aircraft Company. Work began in 1952 toward the United States Air Force's (USAF) requirement for a jet-powered aerial refueling tanker. After losing the USAF's tanker competition to the rival Boeing KC-135 Stratotanker in May 1954, Douglas announced in June 1955 its derived jetliner project marketed to civil operators. In October 1955, Pan Am made the first order along with the competing Boeing 707, and many other airlines soon followed. The first DC-8 was rolled out in Long Beach Airport on April 9, 1958, and flew for the first time on May 30. Following Federal Aviation Administration (FAA) certification in August 1959, the DC-8 entered service with Delta Air Lines on September 18.

Permitting six-abreast seating, the four-engined, low-wing jet aircraft was initially produced in four 151 ft (46 m) long variants. The DC-8-10 was powered by Pratt & Whitney JT3C turbojets, and had a 273,000 lb (124 t) MTOW; the DC-8-20 had more powerful JT4A turbojets, for a 276,000 lb (125 t) MTOW. The intercontinental models had more fuel capacity, and had an MTOW of up to 315,000 lb (143 t); it was powered by JT4As for the Series 30, and by Rolls-Royce Conway turbofans for the Series 40. The Pratt & Whitney JT3D powered the later DC-8-50 and Super 60 (DC-8-61, -62, and -63) as well as freighter versions, and reached a MTOW of 325,000 lb (147 t). A stretched DC-8 variant was not initially considered, leading some airlines to order the competing Boeing 707 instead.

The improved Series 60 was announced in April 1965. The DC-8-61 was stretched by 36 ft (11 m) for 180–220 seats in mixed-class and a MTOW of 325,000 lb (147 t). It first flew on March 14, 1966, was certified on September 2, 1966, and entered service with United Airlines in February 1967. The long-range DC-8-62 followed in April 1967, stretched by 7 ft (2.1 m), could seat up to 189 passengers over 5,200 nautical miles [nmi] (9,600 km; 6,000 mi) with a larger wing for a MTOW up to 350,000 lb (159 t). The DC-8-63 had the long fuselage and the enlarged wing, freighters MTOW reached 355,000 lb (161 t).

The DC-8 was produced until 1972 with 556 aircraft built; it was superseded by larger wide-body airliners including Douglas' DC-10 trijet. Noise concerns stimulated demand for a quieter variant; from 1975, Douglas and General Electric offered the Series 70 retrofit, powered by the quieter and more fuel-efficient CFM56 turbofan engine. It largely exited passenger service during the 1980s and 1990s, but two re-engined DC-8s remain in use as freighters.

== Development ==
=== Background ===
At the end of World War II, Douglas was the dominant North American aircraft producer in the commercial aviation market. Douglas produced a succession of piston-engined aircraft (DC-2, DC-3, DC-4, DC-5, DC-6, and DC-7) through the 1930s, 1940s, and 1950s. While de Havilland flew the world's first jet airliner, the Comet, in May 1949, Douglas initially refrained from developing a jet airliner.

De Havilland's pioneering Comet entered airline service in May 1952. Initially, it appeared to be a success, but the Comet was grounded in 1954 after two fatal accidents which were subsequently attributed to rapid metal fatigue failure of the pressure cabin. Various aircraft manufacturers benefited from the findings and experiences gained from the investigation into Comet losses; specifically, Douglas paid significant attention to detail in the design of the DC-8's pressurized cabin. By 1952, Douglas had continued its success as a commercial aircraft manufacturer, having received almost 300 orders for its piston-engine DC-6 and its successor, the DC-7, which had yet to fly. The Comet disasters, and the airlines' subsequent lack of interest in jets, seemed to validate the company's decision to remain with propeller-driven aircraft, but its inaction enabled rival manufacturers to take the lead instead.

As early as 1949, rival company Boeing had started design work on a pure jet airliner. Boeing's military arm had experience with large long-range jets, such as the B-47 Stratojet and the B-52 Stratofortress strategic bombers. While producing and supporting these bombers for the United States Air Force (USAF), Boeing had developed a close relationship with the USAF's Strategic Air Command (SAC). The company also supplied the SAC's refueling aircraft, the piston-engined KC-97 Stratofreighters, but these proved to be too slow and low flying to easily work with the new jet bombers. The B-52, in particular, had to descend from its cruising altitude and then slow almost to its stall speed to refuel from the KC-97. Believing that a requirement for a jet-powered tanker was a certainty, Boeing started work on a new jet aircraft for this role that could be adapted into an airliner. As an airliner, it would have similar seating capacity to the Comet, but the use of a swept wing enabled a higher cruising speed and better range. First presented in 1950 as the Model 473-60C, Boeing failed to generate any interest from airlines, yet remained confident that the project was worthwhile and pressed ahead with a prototype, the Boeing 367-80 ("Dash-80"). After spending $16 million of its own money to build it, the Dash-80 rolled out on May 15, 1954.

=== Early design phase ===
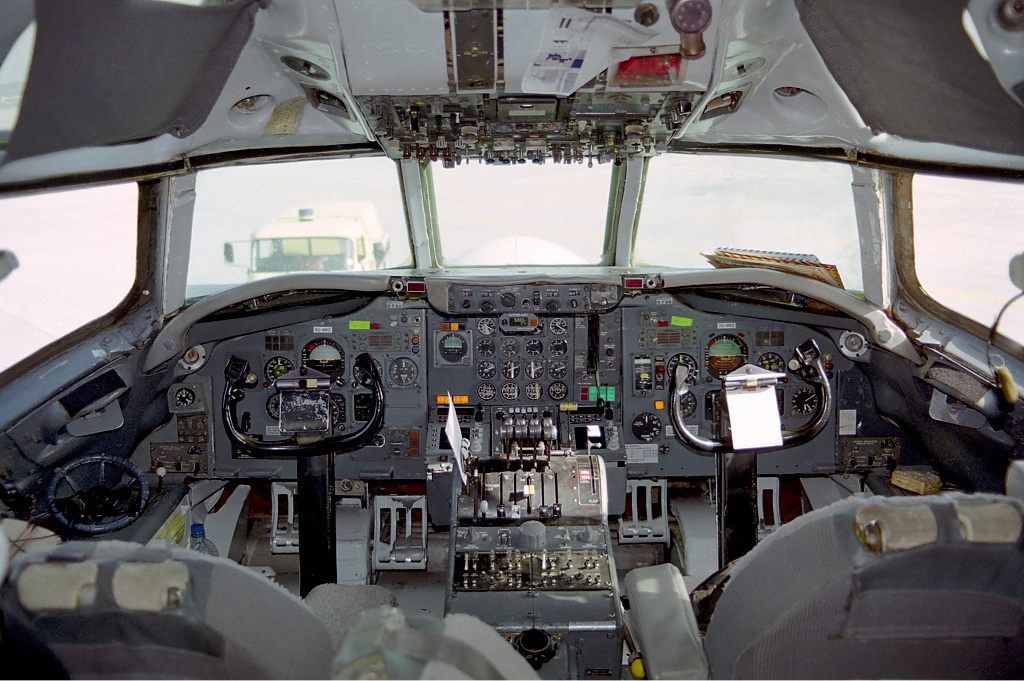
DC-8 cockpit

During mid-1952, Douglas opted to covertly begin work on definition studies for a jet-powered transport aircraft. The company's design team examined various arrangements, including some that closely resembled the Comet. By mid-1953, the team had settled on a form similar to the final DC-8; an 80-seat, low-wing aircraft powered by four Pratt & Whitney JT3C turbojet engines, 30° wing sweep, and an internal cabin diameter of 11 feet (3.35 m) to allow five-abreast seating. The use of podded engines was seen as highly beneficial for maintenance purposes as well as to increase wing volume for accommodating fuel. The fuselage featured a double-bubble cross-section that produced relatively low drag while providing for a relatively spacious passenger cabin along with a large cargo deck that was sufficiently tall as to permit ground crews to stand up within it.

While Douglas remained lukewarm about the jet airliner project, it believed that the USAF tanker contract would go to two companies for two different aircraft, as several USAF transport contracts in the past had done. In May 1954, the USAF circulated its requirement for 800 jet tankers to Boeing, Douglas, Convair, Fairchild Aircraft, Lockheed Corporation, and Martin Marietta. At the time, Boeing was only two months away from having its prototype in the air. Just four months after issuing the tanker requirement, the USAF ordered the first 29 KC-135 Stratotankers from Boeing. Donald Douglas was reportedly shocked by the rapidity of the decision which, he claimed, had been made before the competing companies even had time to complete their bids. He protested to Washington, but without success.

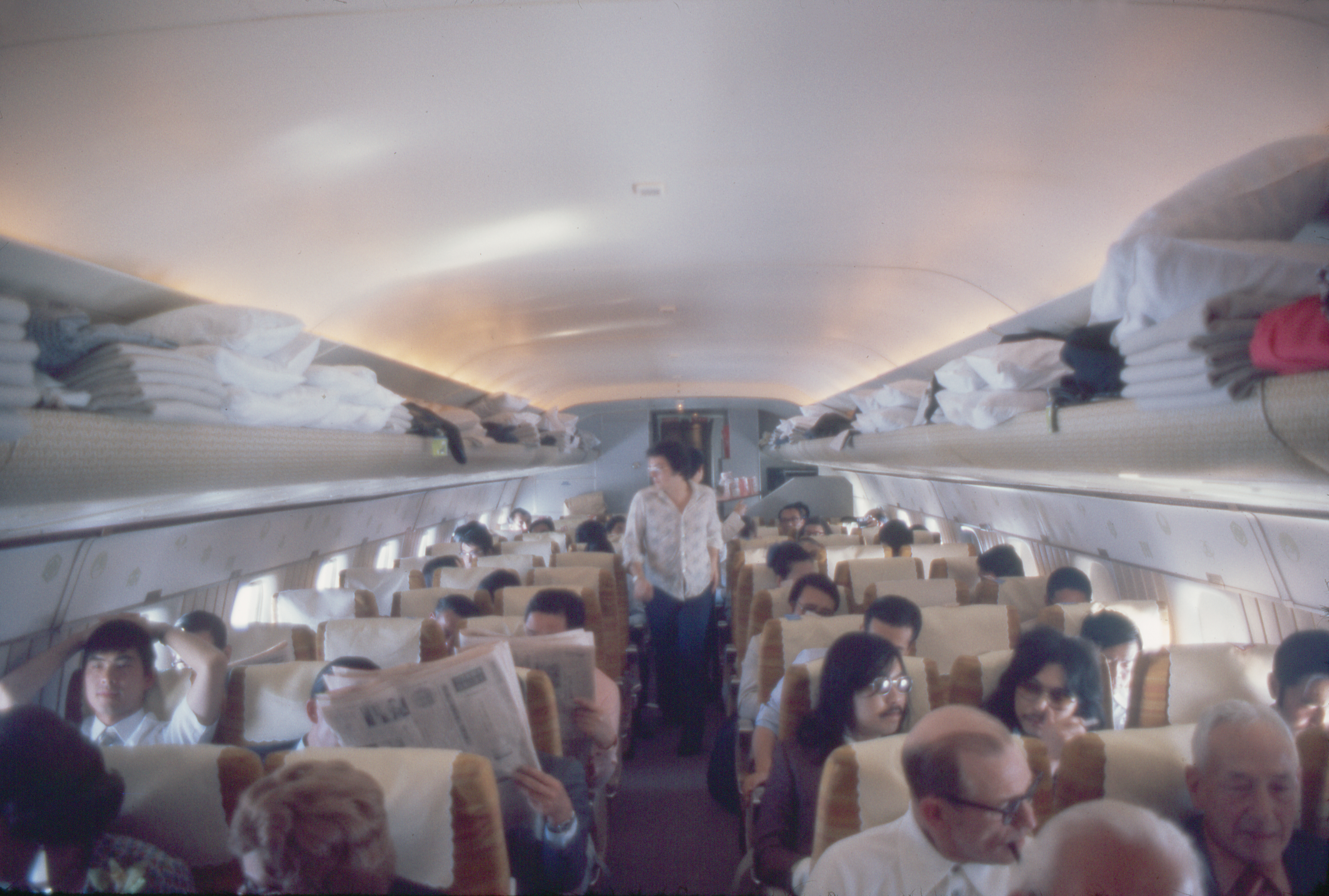
Six-abreast economy cabin, 1973

Having already started on the DC-8 project, Douglas decided that the best option was to press on than abandon the project. Following consultations with the airlines, several design changes were made, such as the fuselage being widened by 15 inches (38 cm) to permit six-abreast seating, which in turn led to larger wings and tail surfaces being adopted along with a lengthening of the fuselage. The existence of the DC-8 was formally announced on June 7, 1955; at the time of the announcement, the development costs had been forecast to be roughly $450 million. Four versions were offered to begin with, all with the same 150-foot-6-inch (45.87 m) long airframe with a 141-foot-1-inch (43.00 m) wingspan, but varying in engines and fuel capacity, and with maximum weights of about 240,000–260,000 lb (109–118 metric tons). Douglas steadfastly refused to offer different fuselage sizes. The maiden flight was planned for December 1957, with entry into revenue service in 1959. Aware that the program was lagging behind Boeing, Douglas began a major marketing push to promote its new jetliner.

=== First orders ===
Douglas' previous thinking about the airliner market seemed to be coming true; the transition to turbine power looked likely to be to turboprops rather than turbojets. The pioneering 40–60-seat Vickers Viscount was in service and proving popular with passengers and airlines: it was faster, quieter, and more comfortable than piston-engined types. Another British rival was the 90-seat Bristol Britannia, and Douglas's main rival in the large airliner market, Lockheed Corporation, had committed to the short to medium range 80–100-seat turboprop Electra, with a launch order from American Airlines for 35 and other orders flowing in. Meanwhile, the Comet remained grounded, the French 90-passenger twin jet Sud Aviation Caravelle prototype had just flown for the first time, and the Boeing 707 was not expected to be available until late 1958. The major airlines were reluctant to commit themselves to the huge financial and technical challenges of jet aircraft; however, none could afford not to buy jets if their competitors did.

There the matter rested until October 1955, when Pan American World Airways placed simultaneous orders with Boeing for 20 707s and Douglas for 25 DC-8s. To buy one expensive and untried jet-powered aircraft type was brave: to buy both was, at the time, unheard of. In the closing months of 1955, other airlines rushed to follow suit: Air France, American Airlines, Braniff International Airways, Continental Airlines, and Sabena ordered 707s; United Airlines, National Airlines, KLM, Eastern Air Lines, Japan Air Lines, and Scandinavian Airlines System (SAS) chose the DC-8. In 1956, Air India, BOAC, Lufthansa, Qantas, and TWA added over 50 to the 707 order book, while Douglas sold 22 DC-8s to Delta, Swissair, TAI, Trans Canada, and UAT. By the start of 1958, Douglas had sold 133 DC-8s compared to Boeing's 150 707s.

=== Production and testing ===
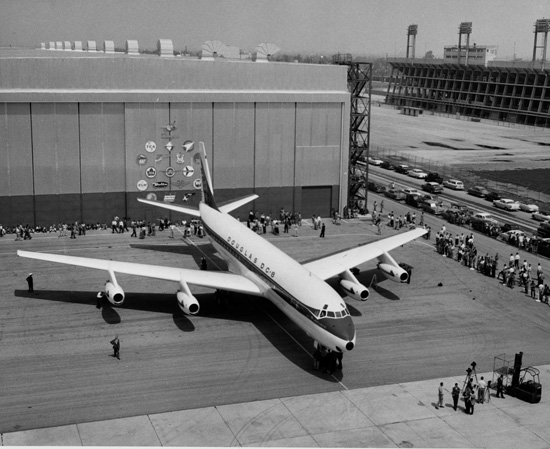
The DC-8-10 was first launched on April 9, 1958.

Donald Douglas proposed to build and test the DC-8 at Santa Monica Airport, which had been the birthplace of the DC-3 and home to a Douglas plant that employed 44,000 workers during World War II. To accommodate the new jet, Douglas asked the city of Santa Monica, California to lengthen the airport's 5,000-foot (1,500-meter) runway. Following complaints by neighboring residents, the city refused, so Douglas moved its airliner production line to Long Beach Airport. In September 1956, production of the first prototype commenced. The first DC-8 N8008D was rolled out of the new Long Beach factory on 9 April 1958 and flew for the first time, in Series 10 form, on 30 May for two hours and seven minutes with the crew being led by A.G. Heimerdinger.

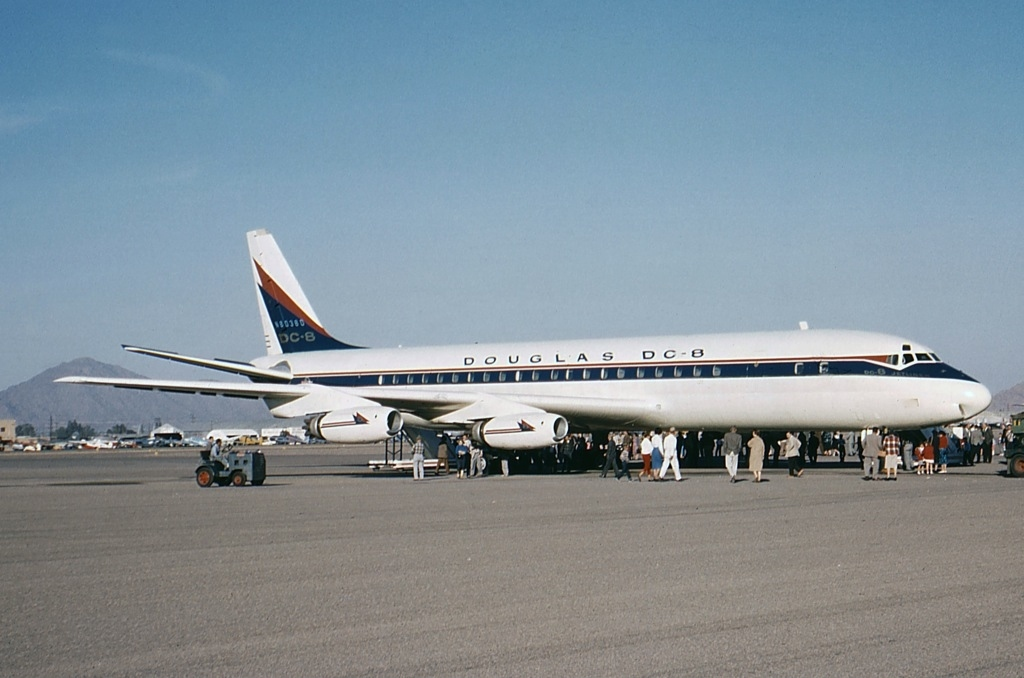
An early DC-8-10 in Douglas livery, 1959. The DC-8 first flew on May 30, 1958, and was certificated in August 1959.

Later that year, an enlarged version of the Comet finally returned to service, but had arrived too late to secure a substantial portion of the market: de Havilland secured just 25 orders. In August, Boeing had begun delivering 707s to Pan Am. Douglas made a massive effort to close the gap with Boeing, using no fewer than ten aircraft for flight testing to achieve Federal Aviation Administration (FAA) certification for the first of the many DC-8 variants in August 1959. Several modifications proved to be necessary: the original air brakes on the lower rear fuselage were found to be ineffective and were deleted as engine thrust reversers had become available; unique leading-edge slots were added to improve low-speed lift; the prototype was 25 kn (46 km/h) short of its promised cruising speed and a new, slightly larger wingtip had to be developed to reduce drag. Also, a recontoured wing leading edge was later developed to extend the chord 4% and reduce drag at high Mach numbers.

On August 21, 1961, a DC-8-43 broke the sound barrier at Mach 1.012 (668 mph/1,075 km/h) while in a controlled dive through 41,088 feet (12,524 m) and maintained that speed for 16 seconds. The flight was to collect data on a new leading edge design for the wing, and, while doing so, the DC-8-43 became the first civilian jet – and the first jet airliner – to make a supersonic flight. The aircraft was DC-8-43 registered as CF-CPG, later delivered to Canadian Pacific Air Lines. The aircraft, crewed by Captain William Magruder, First Officer Paul Patten, Flight Engineer Joseph Tomich and Flight Test Engineer Richard Edwards, took off from Edwards Air Force Base in California and was accompanied to altitude by a Lockheed F-104A-10-LO Starfighter supersonic chase aircraft flown by Chuck Yeager and one North American F-100 Super Sabre also supersonic.

=== Entry into service ===
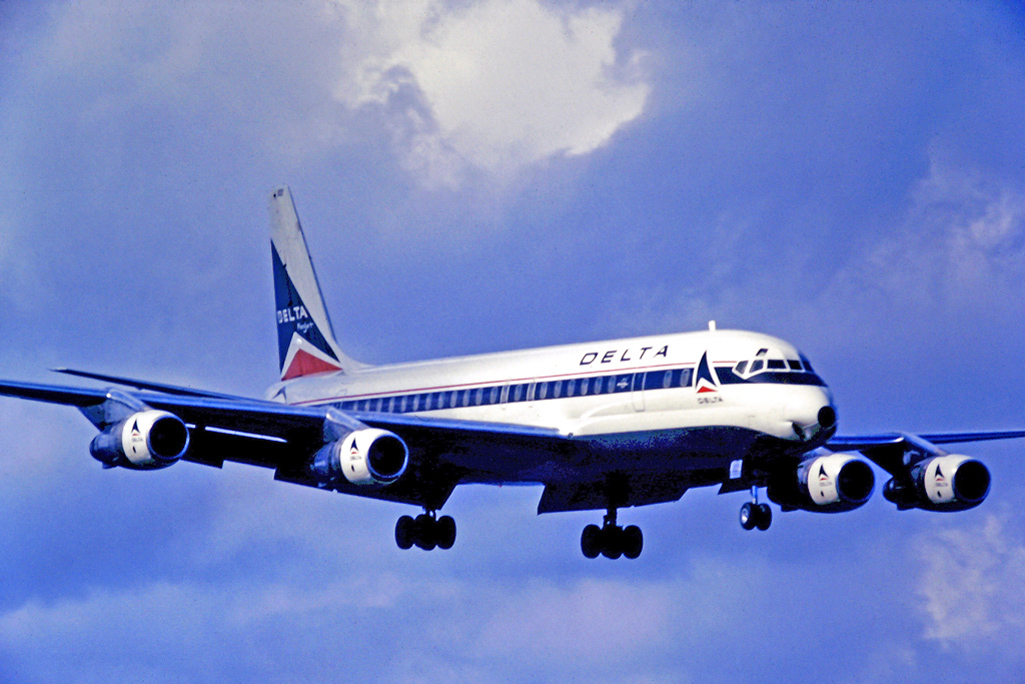
The DC-8 entered service with Delta Air Lines on September 18, 1959.

On September 18, 1959, the DC-8 entered service with Delta Air Lines and United Airlines. According to the Delta Air Lines website, the air carrier was the first to operate the DC-8 in scheduled passenger service. By March 1960, Douglas had reached its planned production rate of eight DC-8s per month. Despite a large number of DC-8 early models being available, all used the same basic airframe, differing only in engines, weights and details; in contrast, the rival Boeing 707 range offered several fuselage lengths and two wingspans: the original 144-foot (44 m) 707-120, a 135-foot (41 m) version that sacrificed space to gain longer range, and the stretched 707-320, which at 153 feet (47 m) overall had 10 feet (3.0 m) more cabin space than the DC-8.

Douglas' refusal to offer different fuselage sizes made it less adaptable and compelled airlines such as Delta and United to look elsewhere for short to medium range types. Delta ordered Convair 880s while United chose the newly developed short-fuselage 707-020. United prevailed on Boeing to rename the new variant the Boeing 720 in case the public thought they were dissatisfied with the DC-8. Pan Am never reordered the DC-8 and Douglas gradually lost market share to Boeing. In 1962, DC-8 sales dropped to just 26 aircraft that year, followed by 21 in 1963 and 14 in 1964; many of these later deliveries were of the Jet Trader model rather than the more-prestigious passenger versions. In 1967, Douglas merged with McDonnell Aircraft, becoming McDonnell Douglas.

=== Further developments ===
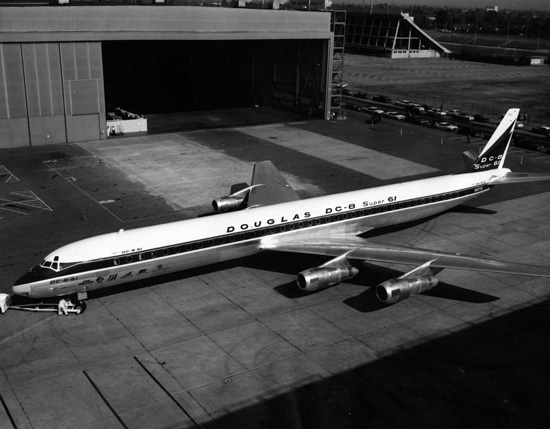
Announced in April 1965, the DC-8 Super 61 was stretched by 36.7 ft (11.2 m).

During the early 1960s, Douglas began considering stretching the DC-8, a feat that was eased by its fuselage keeping the same dimensions across its length. In April 1965, the company announced belated fuselage stretches for the DC-8 with three new models known as the Super Sixties. The DC-8 program had been in danger of closing with fewer than 300 aircraft sold, but the Super Sixties brought fresh life to it. By the time production of the DC-8 ceased in 1972, 262 of the Super Sixties had been completed, almost half of all models produced. With the ability to seat 269 passengers, the DC-8 Series 61 and 63 had the largest passenger-carrying capacity available. That remained so until the Boeing 747 arrived in 1970. The DC-8-62 featured a shorter fuselage when compared with the Series 61 and 63, but was capable of nonstop long-range operations.

All of the earlier jetliners were relatively noisy by modern standards. Increasing traffic densities and changing public attitudes led to complaints about aircraft noise and moves to introduce restrictions. As early as 1966 the Port Authority of New York and New Jersey expressed concern about the noise to be expected from the then still-unbuilt DC-8-61, and operators had to agree to operate it from New York at lower weights to reduce noise. By the early 1970s, legislation for aircraft noise standards was being introduced in many countries, and the 60 Series DC-8s were particularly at risk of being banned from major airports.

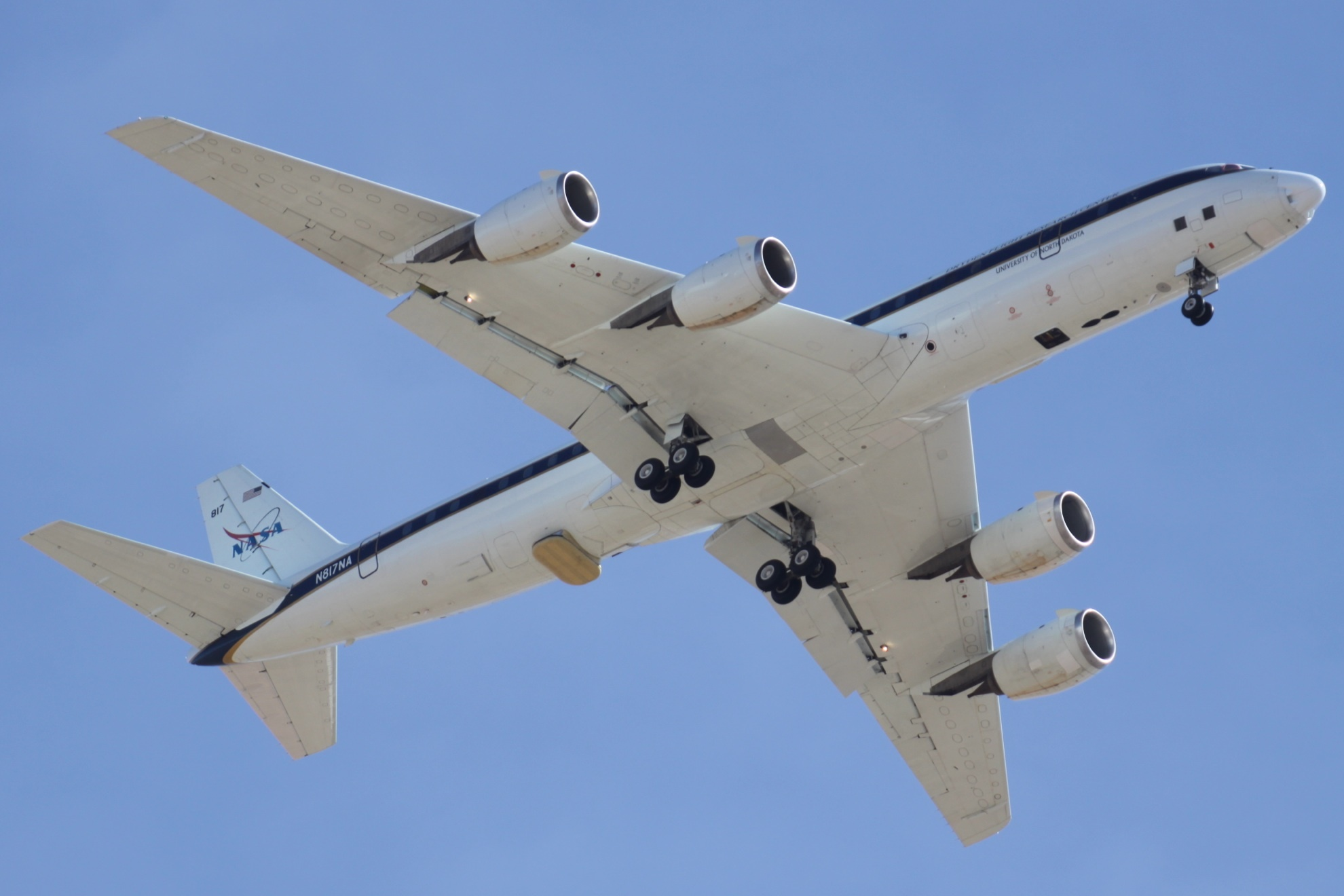
From the late 1970s, the Super 70s were re-engined with larger, more efficient CFM56s.

In the early 1970s, several airlines approached McDonnell Douglas with requests for noise reduction modifications to their DC-8s. While third parties had developed aftermarket hushkits, there was initially no meaningful action taken by Douglas to fulfil these requests and effectively enable the DC-8 to remain in service. Finally, in 1975, General Electric began discussions with major airlines to fit the new and vastly-quieter Franco-American CFM56 engine to both DC-8s and 707s. MDC remained reluctant but eventually came on board in the late 1970s and helped develop the Series 70. The Super Seventies proved to be a great success, being roughly 70% quieter than the 60 Series and, at the time of their introduction, the world's quietest four-engined airliner. As well as being quieter and more powerful, the CFM56 was up to 23% more fuel-efficient than the JT3D, which reduced operating costs and extended the range. The largest single customer for the Series 70 was United, converting 29 of its Series 61 airliners at a reported cost of $400 million.

United Airlines retired its last DC-8-71 on October 31, 1991. The final scheduled all-passenger DC-8 services were operated by Hawaiian Airlines using DC-8-62 and DC-8-63 models, which were retired in August 1993. The ultimate commercial passenger service for the DC-8 was provided by Air Transport International (ATI) through passenger charters and combi missions using DC-8-62 and DC-8-72 combi variants. While ATI also operated early DC-8-55s and "Super" 60/70 series (divided into DC-8-61/63 and DC-8-71/73), those models primarily served as pure freighters; only the DC-8-62/72 maintained long-term "passenger cabins" (rear cabins) and windows. These services concluded on May 17, 2013, with the very last DC-8-72 retiring in 2015, marking the official end of all commercial passenger services for the DC-8 worldwide. ATI subsequently replaced these aircraft with a fleet of newer models, including the Boeing 757 and Boeing 767.

The final DC-8 aircraft maintained in a passenger-capable configuration (Registration: N782SP, formerly ATI N721CX) was retired from commercial service in 2015 and subsequently acquired by Samaritan's Purse. This DC-8-72CF featured a 'Combi' layout, retaining a rear passenger cabin with windows and seating alongside a forward cargo compartment. Following a decade of humanitarian service, the aircraft conducted its final operational flight on November 14, 2025. It was replaced by a Boeing 767 and donated to Liberty University for static preservation and educational use, and will go on display at Lynchburg Regional Airport in Lynchburg, Virginia.

By 2002, of the 1,032 Boeing 707s and 720s manufactured for commercial use, just 80 remained in service – though many of those 707s were converted for USAF use, either in service or for spare parts. Of the 556 DC-8s made, around 200 were still in commercial service in 2002, including about 25 50-Series, 82 of the stretched 60-Series, and 96 out of the 110 re-engined 70-Series. Most of the surviving DC-8s are now used as freighters. In May 2009, 97 DC-8s were in service following UPS's decision to retire its remaining fleet of 44. In January 2013, an estimated 36 DC-8s were in use worldwide. As a result of aging, increasing operating costs and strict noise and emissions regulations, the number of active DC-8s continues to decline, with the youngest airframes having exceeded 50 years of age in 2022.

== Variants ==
=== Series 10 ===
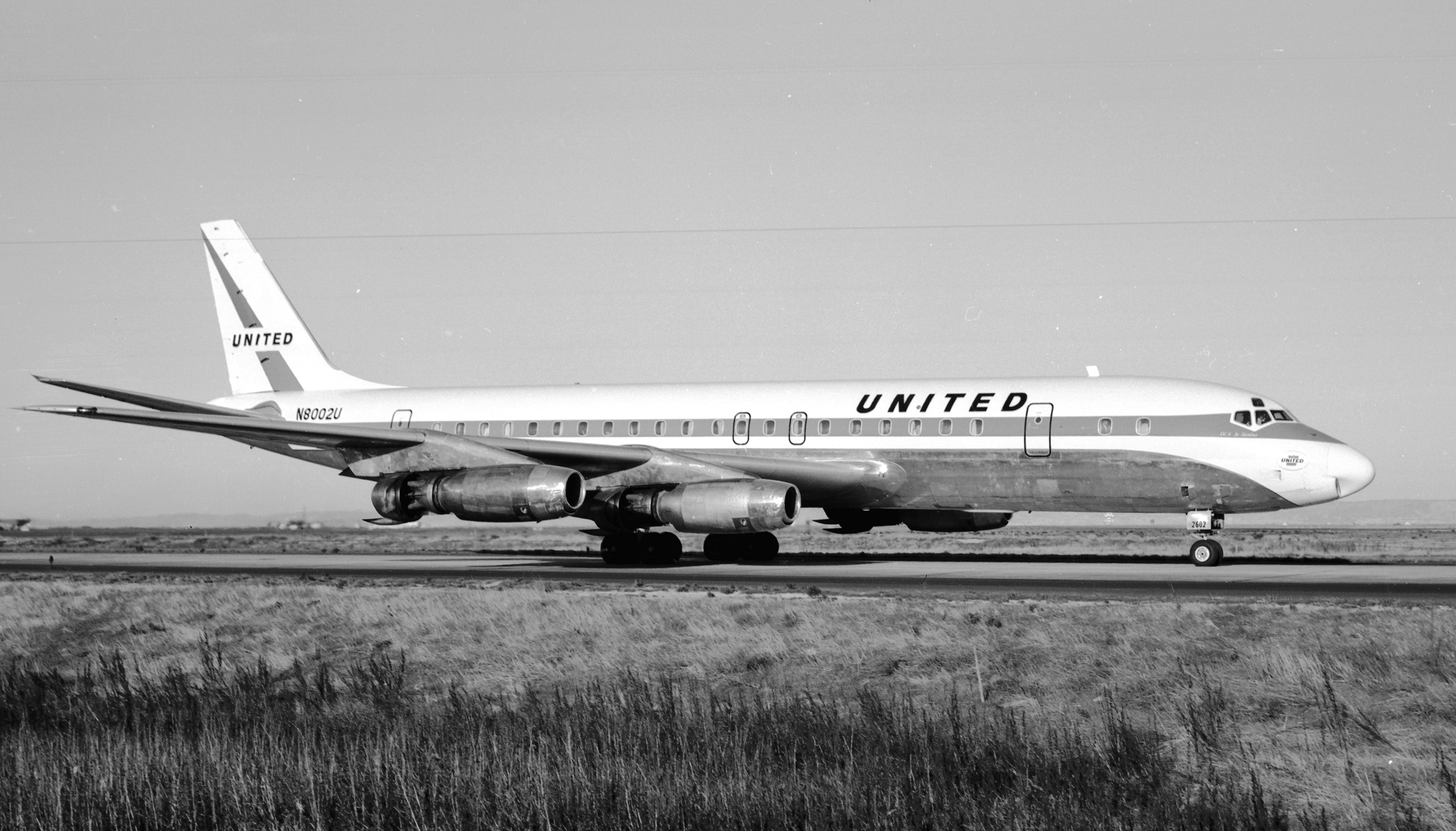
United Airlines DC-8-11, powered by Pratt & Whitney JT3C turbojets. All -10 series aircraft that survived long enough were converted to other standards.

For domestic use, powered by 13,500 lbf (60.1 kN) Pratt & Whitney JT3C-6 turbojets with water injection. First Series 10 DC-8 flew on 30 May 1958. The initial DC-8-11 model had the original wingtips used on the prototype, and all remaining DC-8 Series 10 aircraft were upgraded to DC-8-12 standard. The DC-8-12 featured new low-drag wingtips and leading-edge slots, 80 inches (2.0 m) long between the engines on each wing and 34 inches (0.86 m) long inboard of the inner engines. These unique devices were covered by doors on the upper and lower wing surfaces that opened for low-speed flight and closed for cruise. The maximum weight increased from 265,000 to 273,000 pounds (120,200 to 123,830 kg). This model was originally named "DC-8A" until the series 30 was introduced. 30 DC-8-10s were built: 23 for United and six for Delta, plus the prototype. By the mid-sixties, United had converted 16 of its 21 surviving aircraft to DC-8-20 standard and the other five to -50s. Delta converted its six to DC-8-50s. The prototype was itself also converted to a DC-8-50.

It received FAA certification on August 31, 1958, entering service with United Airlines and Delta Air Lines on September 18, 1959.

=== Series 20 ===
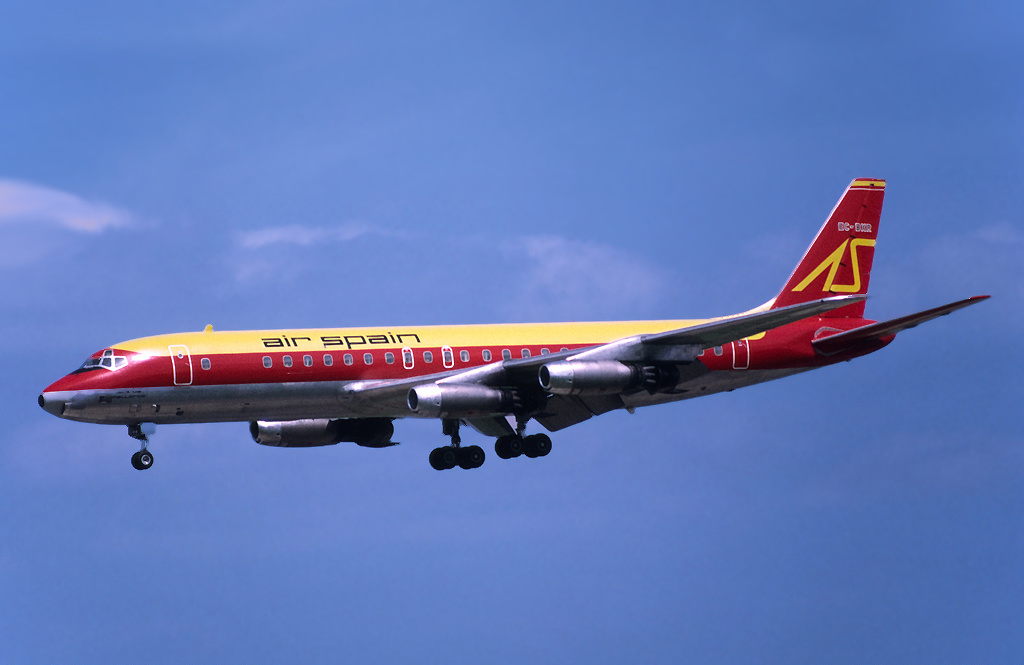
Air Spain DC-8-21, powered by Pratt & Whitney JT4A turbojets, like the heavier Series 30

Higher-powered 15,800 lbf (70.3 kN) thrust Pratt & Whitney JT4A-3 turbojets (without water injection) allowed a weight increase to 276,000 pounds (125,190 kg). 33 DC-8-20s were built plus 16 converted DC-8-10s. This model was originally named "DC-8B" but was renamed when the Series 30 was introduced.

The first Series 20 DC-8 flew on November 29, 1958 and received FAA certification on January 19, 1960.

=== Series 30 ===
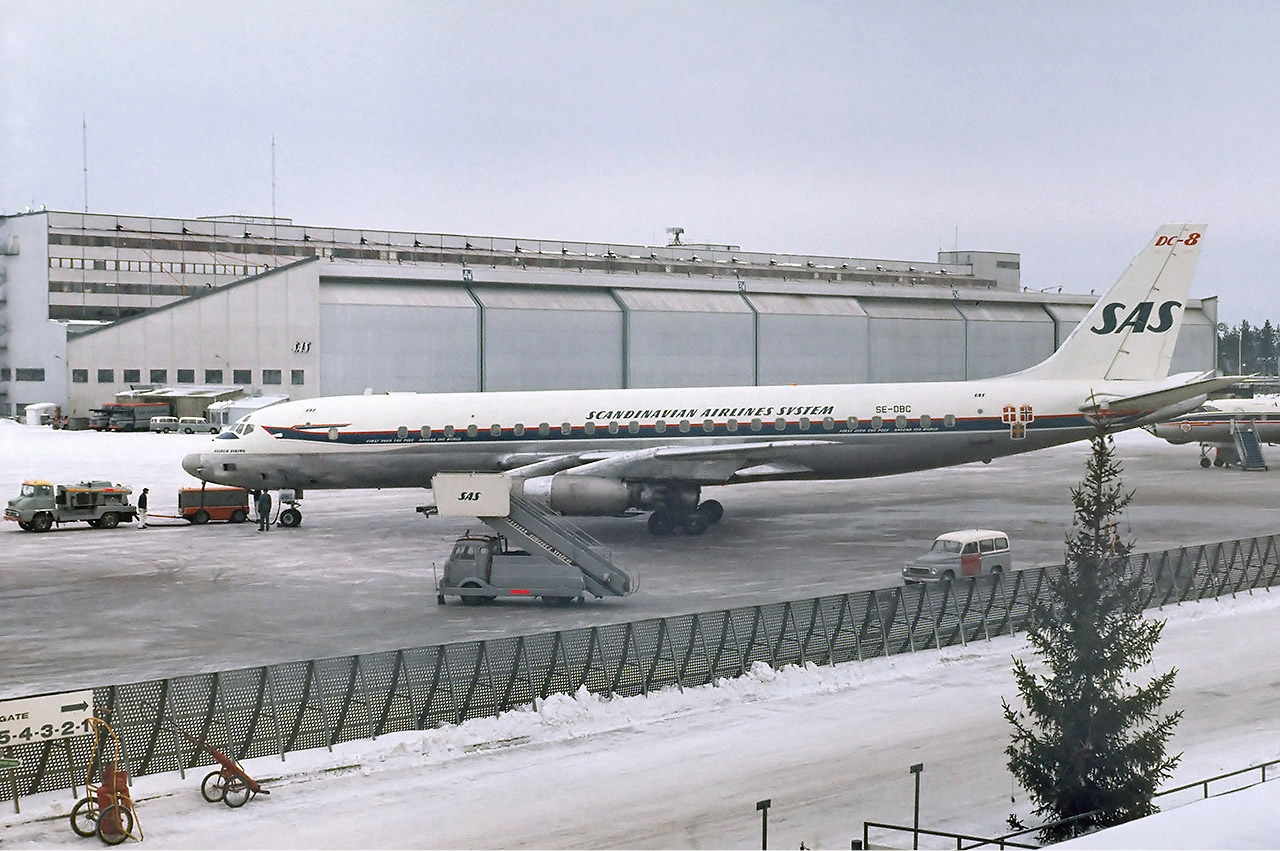
A Douglas DC-8-32 of SAS

For intercontinental routes, the three Series 30 variants combined JT4A engines with a one-third increase in fuel capacity and strengthened fuselage and landing gear. The DC-8-31 was certified in March 1960 with 16,800 lbf (74.7 kN) JT4A-9 engines for 300,000-pound (136,080 kg) maximum takeoff weight. The DC-8-32 was similar but allowed 310,000-pound (140,610 kg) weight. The DC-8-33 of November 1960 substituted 17,500 lbf (77.8 kN) JT4A-11 turbojets, a modification to the flap linkage to allow a 1.5° setting for more efficient cruise, stronger landing gear, and 315,000-pound (142,880 kg) maximum weight. Many -31 and -32 DC-8s were upgraded to this standard. A total of 57 DC-8-30s were produced (five of which were later upgraded to DC-8-50 standard).

The Series 30 DC-8 first flew on February 21, 1959 and received FAA certification on February 1, 1960.

=== Series 40 ===
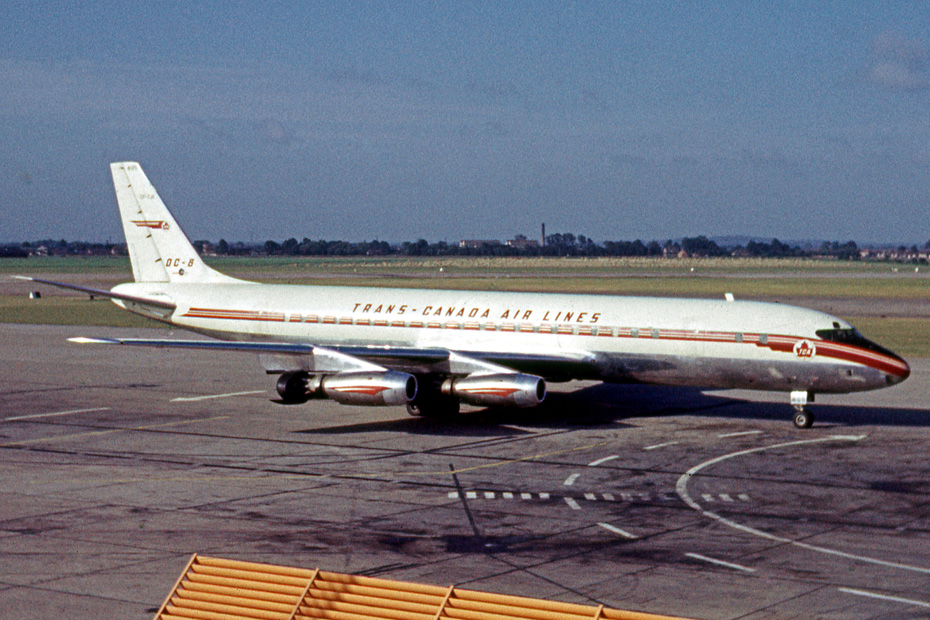
-42 of Trans-Canada Air Lines, powered by Rolls-Royce Conway turbofans

The DC-8-40 was essentially the -30 but with 17,500 lbf (77.8 kN) Rolls-Royce Conway 509 turbofan engines for better efficiency, less noise and less smoke. The Conway was an improvement over the turbojets that preceded it, but the Series 40 sold poorly because of the traditional reluctance of U.S. airlines to buy a foreign product and because the still-more-advanced Pratt & Whitney JT3D turbofan was due in early 1961. The DC-8-41 and DC-8-42 had weights of 300,000 and 310,000 pounds (136,080 and 140,610 kg) respectively, the 315,000-pound (142,880 kg) DC-8-43 had the 1.5° flap setting of the -33 and introduced a 4% leading-edge wing extension to reduce drag and increase fuel capacity slightly – the new wing improved range by 8%, lifting capacity by 6,600 lb (3,000 kg), and cruising speed by better than 10 knots (19 km/h; 12 mph). It was used on all later DC-8s. The first DC-8-40 was delivered in 1960; 32 were built (of which three were eventually converted to DC-8-50s).

The Series 40 DC-8 first flew on July 23, 1959 and received FAA certification on 24 March 1960.

=== Series 50 ===
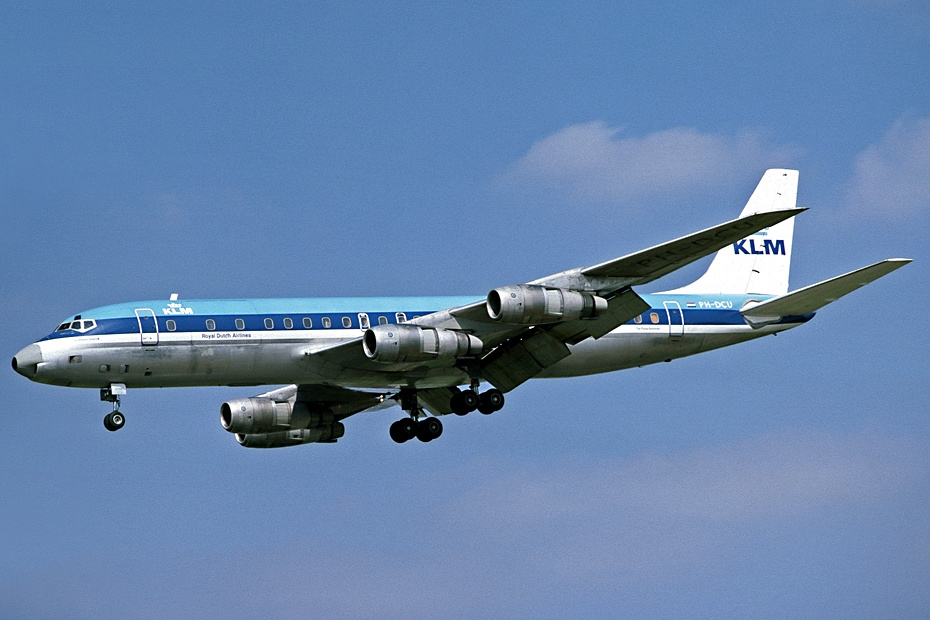
A KLM DC-8-55CF powered by Pratt & Whitney JT3D turbofans

The definitive short-fuselage DC-8 came with the same engine that powered the vast majority of 707s, the JT3D. Twenty earlier DC-8s were converted to this standard. All but the -55 were certified in 1961. The DC-8-51, DC-8-52 and DC-8-53 all had 17,000 lbf (75.6 kN) JT3D-1 or 18,000 lbf (80.1 kN) JT3D-3B engines, varying mainly in their weights: 276,000 pounds (125,190 kg), 300,000 pounds (136,080 kg) and 315,000 pounds (142,880 kg) respectively. The DC-8-55 arrived in June 1964, retaining the JT3D-3B engines but with strengthened structure from the freighter versions and 325,000-pound (147,420 kg) maximum weight. 142 DC-8-50s were built plus the 20 converted from Series 10/30/40.

The Series 50 first flew on December 20, 1960 and received FAA certification on May 1, 1961.

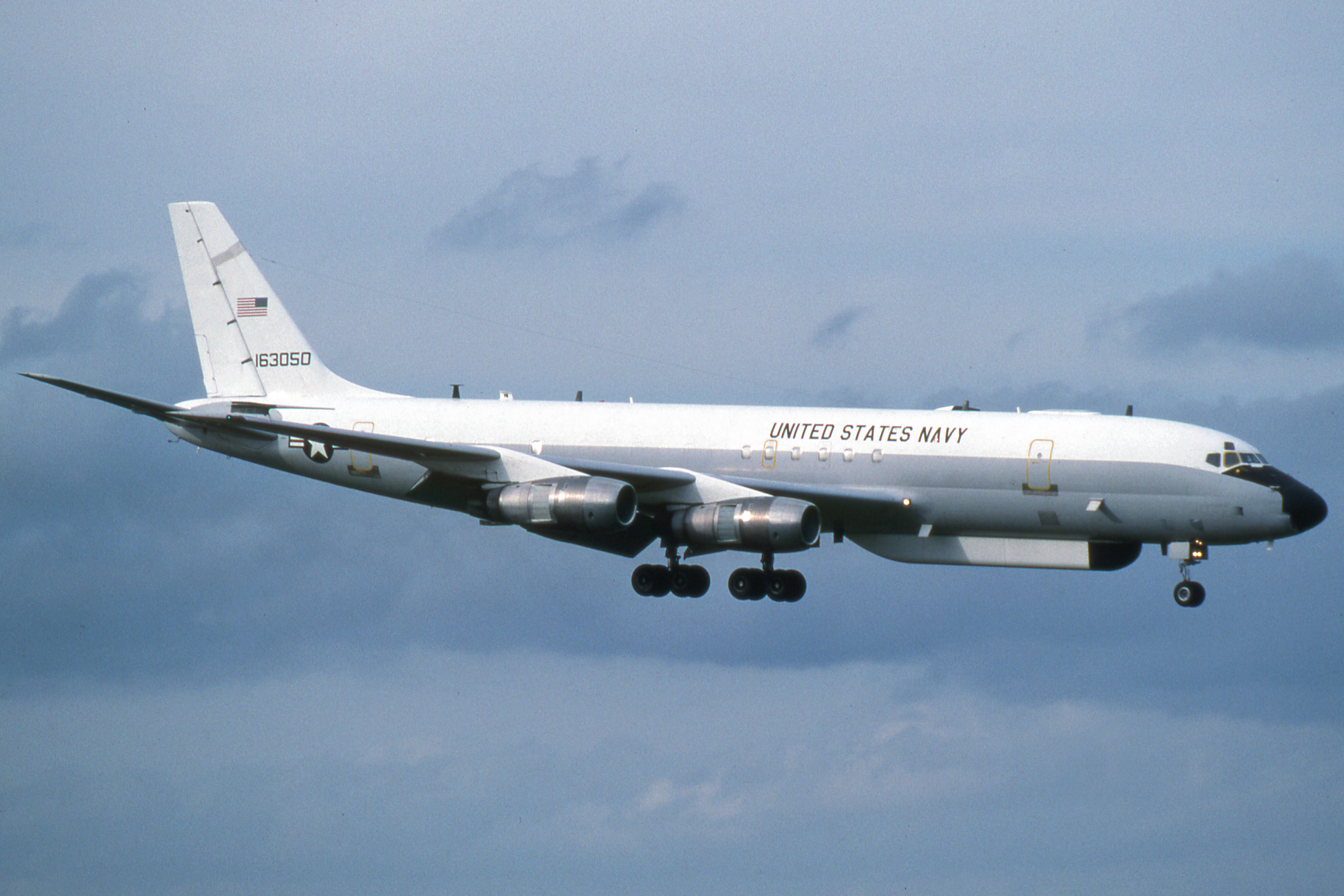
The unique EC-24A electronic warfare trainer of the US Navy

- DC-8 Jet Trader: Douglas approved the development of freighter versions of the DC-8 in May 1961, based on the Series 50. An original plan to fit a fixed bulkhead separating the forward 2/3 of the cabin for freight, leaving the rear cabin for 54 passenger seats was soon replaced by a more practical one to use a movable bulkhead and allow anywhere between 25 and 114 seats with the remainder set aside for cargo. A large cargo door was fitted into the forward fuselage, the cabin floor was reinforced and the rear pressure bulkhead was moved by nearly 7 feet (2.1 m) to make more space. Airlines could order a windowless cabin but only United did, ordering 15 in 1964. The DC-8F-54 had a maximum takeoff weight of 315,000 pounds (142,880 kg) and the DC-8F-55 325,000 pounds (147,420 kg). Both used 18,000 lbf (80.1 kN) JT3D-3B powerplants. 62 aircraft built (plus one converted from a standard DC-8-50 and two of the three converted DC-8-40s).
- EC-24A: A single former United Airlines DC-8-54 (F) was used by the United States Navy as an electronic warfare training platform. It was retired in October 1998 and is now in storage with the 309th Aerospace Maintenance and Regeneration Group.

=== Super 60 Series ===
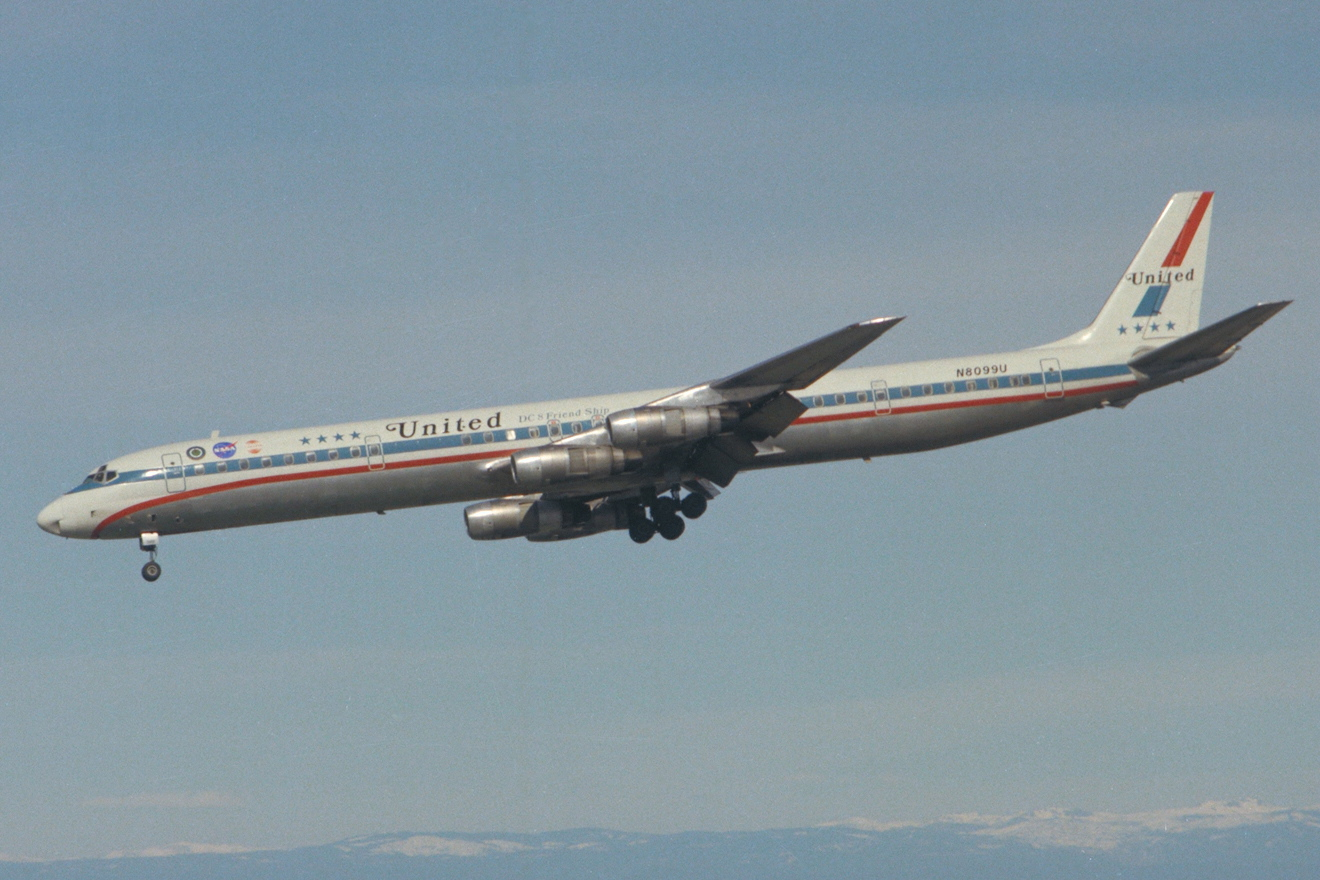
The 187 ft 4 in (57.10 m) long DC-8-61 was introduced by United Airlines in February 1967.

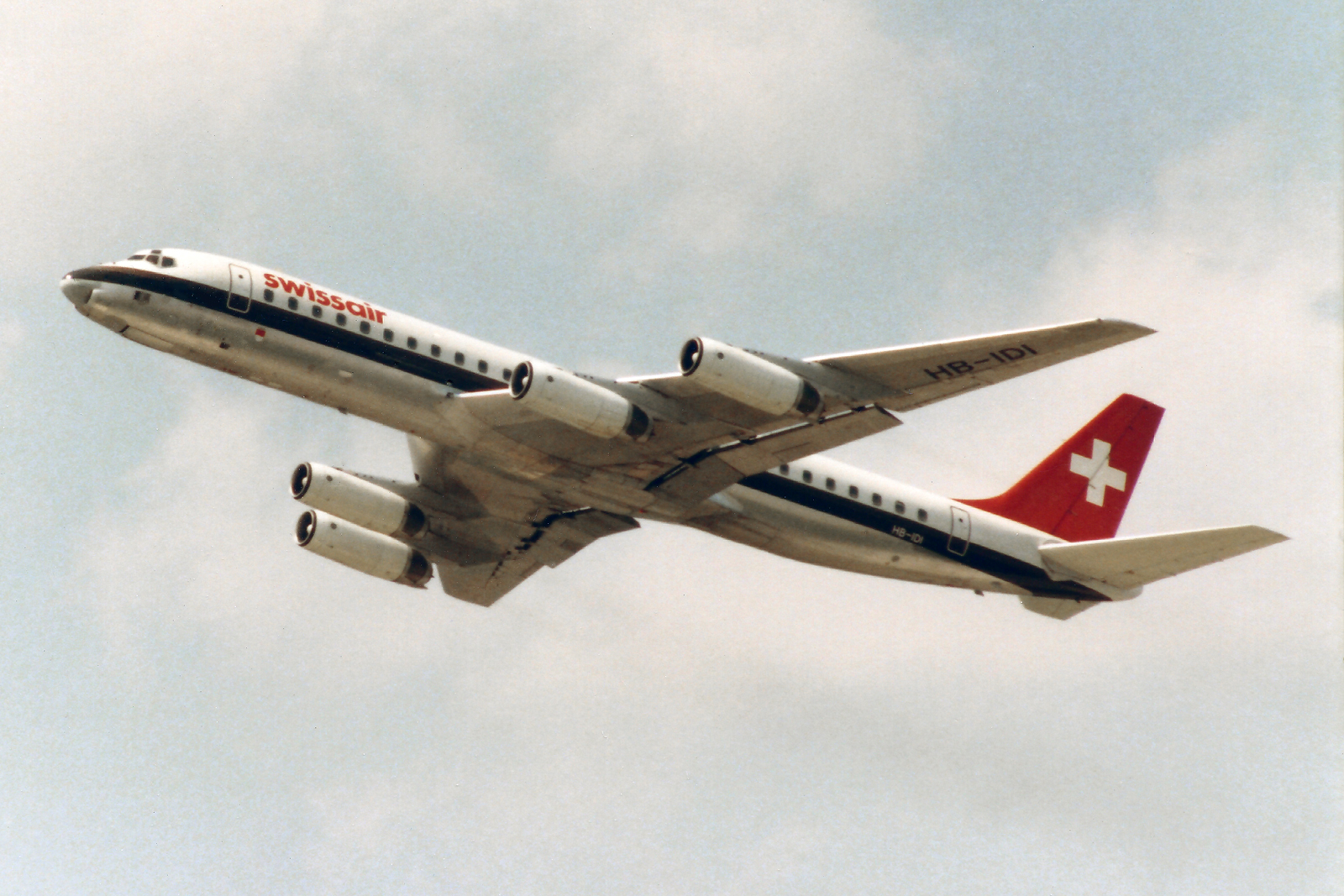
The extended-range 157 ft 5 in (47.98 m) long DC-8-62 followed suit in April 1967.

- DC-8 Series 61: The "Super DC-8" Series 61 was designed for high capacity and medium range. It had the same wings, engines and pylons as the -55, and sacrificed range to gain capacity. Having decided to stretch the DC-8, Douglas inserted a 240-inch (6.1 m) plug in the forward fuselage and a 200-inch (5.1 m) plug aft, taking overall length to 187 feet 4 inches (57.10 m). The added length required strengthening of the structure, but the basic DC-8 design already had sufficient ground clearance to permit the one-third increase in cabin size without requiring longer landing gear. The variant first flew on March 14, 1966, and was certified on September 2, 1966, at a maximum weight of 325,000 pounds (147,420 kg). Deliveries began in January 1967 and it entered service with United Airlines in February 1967. It typically carried 180–220 passengers in mixed-class configuration, or 259 in high-density configuration. A cargo door equipped DC-8-61CF was also available. 78 -61s and 10 -61CFs were built.
- DC-8 Series 62: The long-range Series 62 followed in April 1967. It had a more modest stretch, two 40-inch (1.0 m) plugs fore and aft of the wing taking overall length to 157 feet 5 inches (47.98 m), and a number of modifications to provide greater range. 3 feet (0.91 m) wingtip extensions reduced drag and added fuel capacity, and Douglas redesigned the engine pods, extending the pylons and substituting new shorter and neater nacelles, all in the cause of drag reduction. The 18,000 lbf (80.1 kN) JT3D-3B was retained but the engine pylons were redesigned to eliminate their protrusion above the wing and make them sweep forward more sharply, so that the engines were some 40 inches (1.0 m) further forward. The engine pods were also modified with a reduction in diameter and the elimination of the -50 and -61 bypass duct. The changes all improved the aircraft's aerodynamic efficiency. The DC-8 Series 62 is slightly heavier than the -53 or -61 at 335,000 pounds (151,950 kg), and is able to seat up to 189 passengers. The -62 had a range with full payload of about 5,200 nautical miles (9,600 km; 6,000 mi); roughly the same as the -53, but with 40 extra passengers. Many late production -62s had 350,000 pounds (158,760 kg) maximum takeoff weight and were known as the -62H. Also available were the cargo door-equipped convertible -62CF or all cargo -62AF. Production included 51 DC-8-62s, 10 -62CFs, and 6 -62AFs.
- DC-8 Series 63: The "Super DC-8" Series 63 was the final new-build variant and entered service in June 1968. It had the long fuselage of the -61, as well as the aerodynamic refinements and increased fuel capacity of the -62 and 19,000 lbf (84.5 kN) JT3D-7 engines, allowing a maximum takeoff weight of 350,000 pounds (158,760 kg). Like the -62, the Series 63 was also available as a cargo door equipped -63CF or all cargo -63AF. The freighters had a further increase in Maximum Take Off Weight to 355,000 pounds (161,030 kg). Eastern Air Lines bought six -63PFs which incorporated the strengthened floor of the freighters but lacked the main deck cargo door. Production included 41 DC-8-63s, 53 -63CF, 7 -63AF, and 6 -63PFs. The Flying Tiger Line was a major early customer for the DC-8-63F.

=== Super 70 Series ===
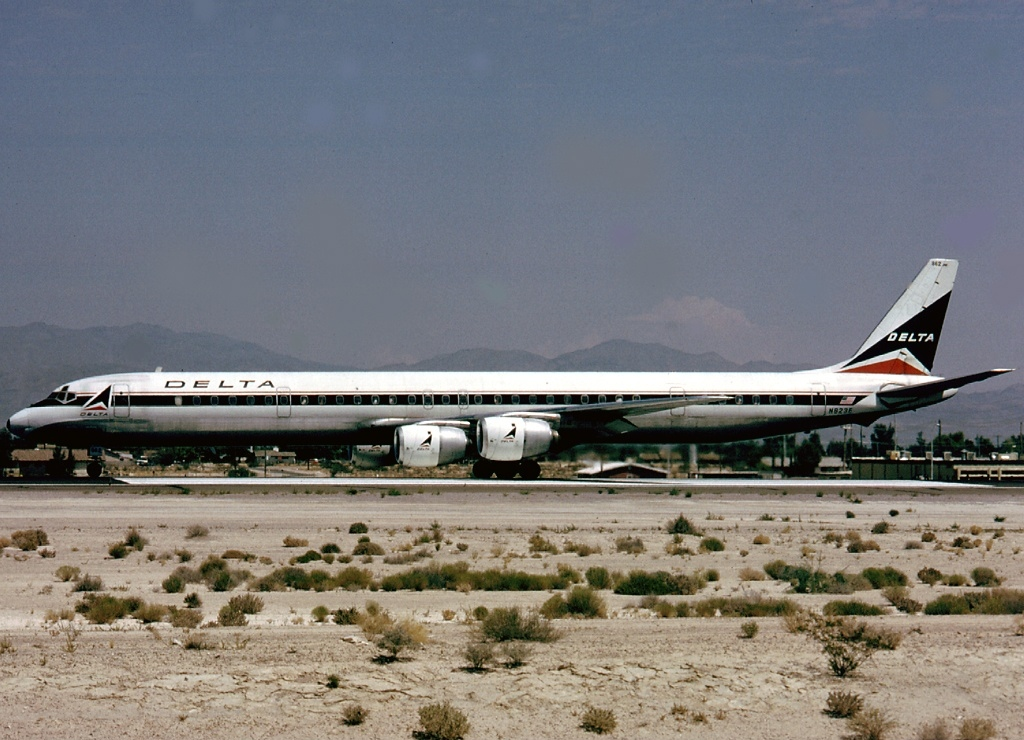
Refitted with CFM56 turbofans, the Super 70 variant was certified in 1982.

The DC-8-71, DC-8-72, and DC-8-73 were straightforward conversions of the -61, -62 and -63 primarily involving the replacement of the JT3D engines with the more fuel-efficient CFM International CFM56-2, a high bypass turbofan, which produced 22,000 lbf (97.9 kN) of thrust. The conversions also includes new nacelles and pylons built by Grumman Aerospace. Maximum takeoff weights remained the same, but there was a slight reduction in payload because of the heavier engines. Modifications to create the -71 was more involved because the -61 did not have the improved wings and relocated engines of the -62 and -63. As well as the re-engine, 70-series aircraft got new avionics, a new air conditioning system and new wing skins. Aircraft would also typically undergo heavy maintenance and an interior refresh as part of the package.

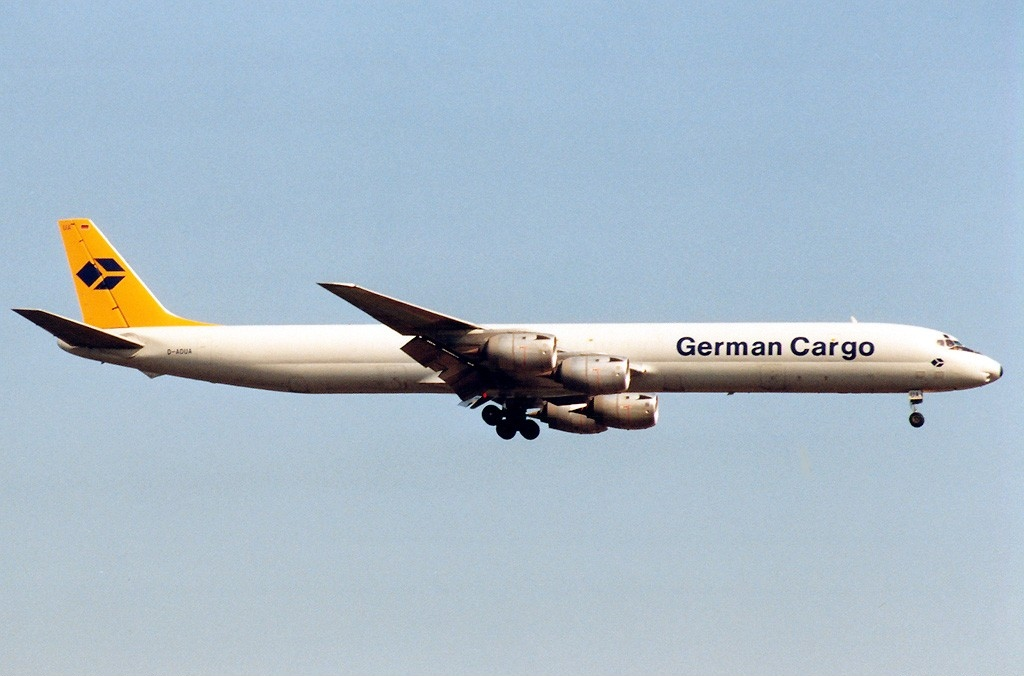
A DC-8-73AF of German Cargo in 1992

All three models were certified in 1982 and a total of 110 60-series Super DC-8s were converted by the time the program ended in 1988. DC-8 series 70 conversions were overseen by Cammacorp with CFMI, McDonnell Douglas, and Grumman Aerospace as partners. Cammacorp was disbanded after the last aircraft was converted.

== Operators ==
As of January 2026, one DC-8 is in commercial service with Congolese cargo airline Trans Air Cargo Service. This is DC-8-73 9S-AJO, which suffered a runway excursion on 8 September 2026, in which it sustained substantial damage.

OB-2231P is the only currently flying DC-8, another DC-8-73 operating for Skybus Jet Cargo of Peru, having been recently returned to service in February 2025.

== Accidents and incidents ==
As of October 2015, the DC-8 had been involved in 146 incidents, including 84 hull-loss accidents, with 2,255 fatalities. The DC-8 has also been involved in 46 hijackings with 2 fatalities. The deadliest incident involving the DC-8 was Nigeria Airways Flight 2120 which crashed from a fire caused by improperly inflated tires on July 11, 1991, with 261 fatalities, while the most recent one was UPS Airlines Flight 1307 in 2006, when it suffered a cargo fire, and the aircraft became a hull loss while all on board survived.

== Aircraft on display ==
The following museums have DC-8s on display or in storage:

- The forward section of a DC-8-32 operated by Japan Air Lines, Fuji, is on display at Haneda Airport, Tokyo. The first jet airliner used by the airline, it was retired from service in 1974 for use as a cockpit trainer.
- The forward section of a DC-8-21 operated by United Airlines, Libyan Airlines, and United African Airlines, 5A-DGK, is on display at Griesheim Airport, Darmstadt. The former jet airliner, it was dismantled in 1983.
- 45280 – DC-8-21 on display at the Chinese Aviation Museum in Datangshan, China. It is an ex-United Airlines aircraft formerly used as a flying eye hospital by ORBIS International.
- 45256 – DC-8-33 on display near Copenhagen Airport, Denmark. It is an ex-Pan Am, Delta Air Lines, and Ghana Airways aircraft formerly used by Grand Investment of Norway.
- 45570 – DC-8-33 on display at the Musée de l'Air at the Paris–Le Bourget Airport in Paris, France. It is an ex-French Air Force electronic warfare aircraft and has been on display since its retirement in 2001.
- 45850 – DC-8-52 on display at the California Science Center in Exposition Park, Los Angeles, California. It is an ex-United Airlines aircraft and is on display outside near Downtown LA.
- 45752 – DC-8-52F on display at Eduardo Gomes International Airport, Brazil. It is an ex-Transportes Charter do Brasil aircraft formerly used for cargo transport. After a hard landing at the airport in June 2004, the aircraft was abandoned there due to the airline's bankruptcy. It was later recovered by Paul Brennan, a prominent New Zealand journalist associated with the non-profit organization "Bring Our Birds Home", and transported to the National Transport & Toy Museum in Wanaka, New Zealand for restoration and display.
- 45881 – DC-8-54AF (EC-24A), on display at the Davis–Monthan Air Force Base in Tucson, Arizona, United States. The aircraft was formerly operated by the Fleet Electronic Warfare Support Group (FEWSG) of the United States Navy, serving as an electronic warfare training platform to simulate adversary forces. Since its retirement in October 1998, it has been preserved by the 309th Aerospace Maintenance and Regeneration Group (AMARG) in its "Celebrity Row" to this day.
- 45922 – DC-8-62CF on display at the Naval Air Museum Barbers Point at Kalaeloa Airport in Kapolei, Hawaii since 2013, ex-Air Transport International.
- 46129 – DC-8-62CF on display at Wilmington Air Park, Ohio. It is an ex-Air Transport International aircraft formerly operated as a combi charter and passenger-cargo transport airliner.
- 46022 – DC-8-62AF on display at Kenneth Kaunda International Airport, Lusaka. It was operated as a freighter by MK Airlines.
- 46132 – DC-8-62F on display at Guaraní International Airport, Minga Guazú, Paraguay. Impounded by Paraguayan authorities around 2006 due to fraudulent registration, the aircraft was abandoned until 2023, when the National Directorate of Civil Aviation (DINAC) officially nationalized it for restoration as an public exhibition, according.
- 46160 – DC-8-61 on display at the Shanghai Aerospace Enthusiasts Center, ex-Japan Airlines. The aircraft was placed on display after being involved in an accident as Japan Air Lines Flight 792.
- 46088 - DC-8-63CF on display at the Michigan Flight Museum, in Ypsilanti Township, Michigan. Donated in 2012 after being operated by National Airlines.
- 46067 – DC-8-72 on display at Kingman Airport, Mohave County, Arizona. It is an ex-Al Nassr Ltd and Brisair aircraft formerly operated as a luxury VIP private jet.
- 46082 - In 2024, NASA retired N817NA, a DC-8-72 flying laboratory that has supported research in meteorology, oceanography, geography, and various other scientific disciplines since 1986 and served additionally as an educational laboratory with the NASA Student Airborne Research Program (SARP) starting in 2009. NASA is to replace the DC-8 with a more capable and fuel-efficient Boeing 777-200ER. The DC-8 was donated to Idaho State University and is preserved at Pocatello Regional Airport.
- 46013 - On December 7th, 2025, Samaritan's Purse retired DC-8-72CF N782SP, the final US-registered DC-8 and third to last operating worldwide. The aircraft was donated to Liberty University, and will go on display at Lynchburg Regional Airport in Lynchburg, Virginia.
- 46086 – DC-8-73F on display at Eduardo Gomes International Airport, Brazil. It is an ex-Brazilian Express Transportes Aéreos aircraft formerly used for cargo transport. Following the airline's bankruptcy and legal asset seizure in 2012, the aircraft has been abandoned in a remote area of the airport tarmac.

== Specifications ==
DC-8-10/20/30/40/50, DC-8-43/55/61/62/63/71/72/73
Variant	-10/20/30	-40/43/50/55	-61/71	-63/73	-62/72
Cockpit crew	Three				
Passengers	177	-40/43: 177, -50/55: 189	259		
Max. cargo	1,390 ft^{3} (39 m^{3})		2,500 ft^{3} (71 m^{3})		1,615 ft^{3} (45.7 m^{3})
Wingspan	142.4 ft (43.4 m)			148.4 ft (45.2 m)	
Length	150.7 ft (45.9 m)		187.4 ft (57.1 m)		157.5 ft (48.0 m)
Fuselage	outside width: 147 in (370 cm), inside width: 138.25 in (351.2 cm)				
Max. Takeoff; Weight (MTOW)	-10: 273,000 lb (123.8 t) -20: 276,000 lb (125.2 t); 30: 315,000 lb (142.9 t)	315,000 lb (142.9 t) -55: 325,000 lb (147.4 t)	325,000 lb (147.4 t) -F: 328,000 lb (148.8 t)	355,000 lb (161.0 t)	350,000 lb (158.8 t) -72F: 335,000 lb (152.0 t)
Max. payload	-10: 46,103 lb (20.9 t) -20: 43,624 lb (19.8 t) -30: 51,870 lb (23.5 t)	52,000 lb (23.6 t) -43: 41,691 lb (18.9 t)	-61: 71,899 lb (32.6 t) -71: 60,300 lb (27.4 t)	-63: 71,262 lb (32.3 t) -73: 64,800 lb (29.4 t)	-62: 51,745 lb (23.5 t) -72: 41,800 lb (19.0 t)
Operating empty weight (OEW)	-10: 119,797 lb (54.3 t) -20: 123,876 lb (56.2 t) -30: 126,330 lb (57.3 t)	-40/50: 124,800 lb (56.6 t) -43: 136,509 lb (61.9 t) -55: 138,266 lb (62.7 t)	-61: 152,101 lb (69.0 t) -71: 163,700 lb (74.3 t)	-63: 158,738 lb (72.0 t) -73: 166,200 lb (75.4 t)	-62: 143,255 lb (65.0 t) -72: 153,200 lb (69.5 t)
Max. fuel	23,393 US gal (19,479 imp gal; 88,550 L), -10/20: 17,550 US gal (14,610 imp gal; 66,400 L)			24,275 US gal (20,213 imp gal; 91,890 L)	
Engines (4x) (Note: turbofans except JT3C and JT4A turbojets)	-10: P&W JT3C -20/30: P&W JT4A	-40/43: RCo.12 -50/55: P&W JT3D-3B	Super 61/62: P&W JT3D-3B, Super 62H/63: P&W JT3D-7; Super 70: CFM56-2		
Cruise speed	Mach 0.82 (483 kn; 895 km/h; 556 mph)				
Range (Note: -10/20/30/40/50: max PL, -43/55/Super 60/Super 70: max pax)	-10: 3,760 nmi (6,960 km; 4,330 mi) -20: 4,050 nmi (7,500 km; 4,660 mi) -30: 4,005 nmi (7,417 km; 4,609 mi)	-40: 5,310 nmi (9,830 km; 6,110 mi) -43: 4,200 nmi (7,800 km; 4,800 mi) -50: 5,855 nmi (10,843 km; 6,738 mi) -55: 4,700 nmi (8,700 km; 5,400 mi)	-61: 3,200 nmi (5,900 km; 3,700 mi) -71: 3,500 nmi (6,500 km; 4,000 mi)	-63: 4,000 nmi (7,400 km; 4,600 mi) -73: 4,500 nmi (8,300 km; 5,200 mi)	-62: 5,200 nmi (9,600 km; 6,000 mi) -72: 5,300 nmi (9,800 km; 6,100 mi)
Freighter versions		-50/-55	-61/71	63/73	-62/72
Volume		-50: 9,310 ft^{3} (264 m^{3}) -55: 9,020 ft^{3} (255 m^{3})	12,171 ft^{3} (344.6 m^{3})	12,830 ft^{3} (363 m^{3})	9,737 ft^{3} (275.7 m^{3})
Payload		-50: 88,022 lb (39.9 t) -55: 92,770 lb (42.1 t)	-61: 88,494 lb (40.1 t) -71: 81,300 lb (36.9 t)	-63: 119,670 lb (54.3 t) -73: 111,800 lb (50.7 t)	-62: 91,440 lb (41.5 t) -72: 90,800 lb (41.2 t)
OEW		-50: 130,207 lb (59.1 t) -55: 131,230 lb (59.5 t)	-61: 145,506 lb (66.0 t) -71: 152,700 lb (69.3 t)	-63: 141,330 lb (64.1 t) -73: 149,200 lb (67.7 t)	-62: 138,560 lb (62.8 t) -72: 140,200 lb (63.6 t)
Max PL; Range		-55: 3,000 nmi (5,600 km; 3,500 mi)	-61/63: 2,300 nmi (4,300 km; 2,600 mi) -71/73: 2,900 nmi (5,400 km; 3,300 mi)		-62: 3,200 nmi (5,900 km; 3,700 mi) -72: 3,900 nmi (7,200 km; 4,500 mi)

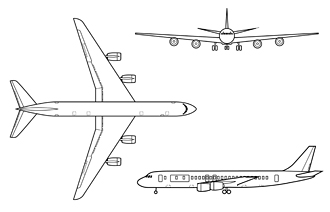
The DC-8 is a low-wing jetliner with a swept wing and four engines.

== Deliveries ==
1959	1960	1961	1962	1963	1964	1965	1966	1967	1968	1969	1970	1971	1972	Total
21	91	42	22	19	20	31	32	41	102	85	33	13	4	556

-10	-20	-30	-40	-50	-61	-62	-63	Total
29	34	57	32	142	88	67	107	556

== See also ==
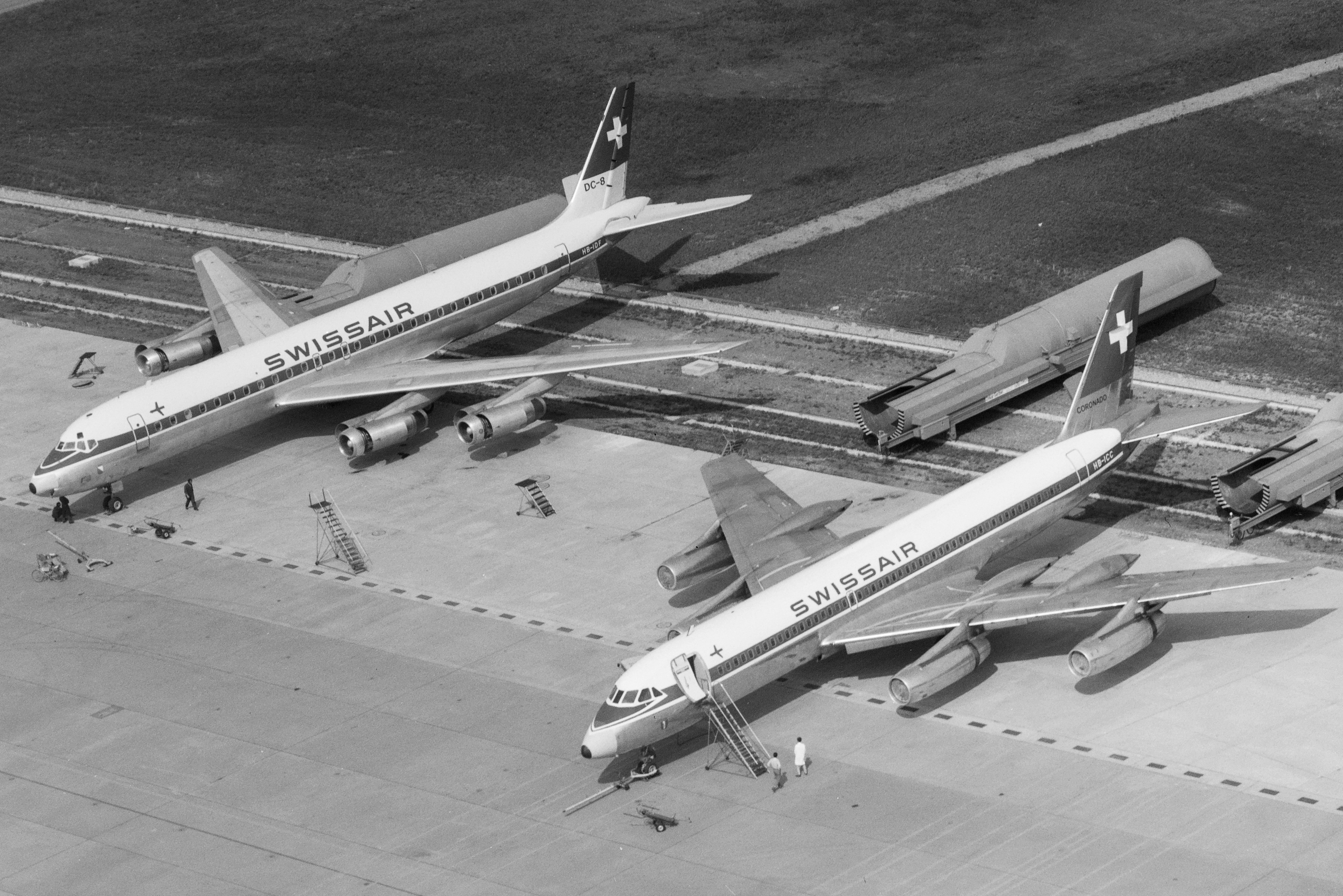
A DC-8 (left, engine cowlings open) and a competing Convair CV-990 (right, with distinctive anti-shock bodies on wings' trailing edge)

Related development

- McDonnell Douglas DC-9

Aircraft of comparable role, configuration, and era

- Boeing 707
- de Havilland Comet
- Convair 990 Coronado
- Ilyushin Il-62
- Shanghai Y-10
- Tupolev Tu-114
- Vickers VC10

Related lists

- List of jet airliners
- List of civil aircraft

== Sources ==
- Anderton, David A. (1976). Progress in Aircraft Design Since 1903. National Aeronautics and Space Administration, Langley Research Center.
- Cook, William H. (1991). The Road To The 707. Society of Automotive Engineers. ISBN 0-9629605-0-0.
- Darling, Kev (2001). De Havilland Comet. Specialty Press. ISBN 1-58007-036-1.
- Dick, Ron; Patterson, Dan (2010). 50 Aircraft That Changed the World. Boston Mills Press. ISBN 978-1-55407-658-1.
- Eden, Paul E. (2016). The World's Most Powerful Civilian Aircraft. Rosen Publishing. ISBN 9781499465891.
- Faith, Nicholas (1996). Black Box: Why Air Safety is no Accident, The Book Every Air Traveller Should Read. Boxtree. ISBN 0-7522-2118-3.
- Francillon, René J. (1982). Lockheed Aircraft since 1913. Putnam. ISBN 0-370-30329-6.
- Green, William; Swanborough, Gordon, eds. (March 1977). "Jet Jubilee (Part 1)". Air International. Vol. 12, no. 2. pp. 124–131.
- Irving, Clive (1994). Wide Body: The Making of the Boeing 747. Coronet. ISBN 0-340-59983-9.
- "Last DC-8 retired". Aeroplane. Vol. 54, no. 2. February 2026. p. 12. ISSN 0143-7240.
- Norris, Guy; Wagner, Mark (1999). Douglas Jetliners. Zenith Imprint. ISBN 9781610607162.
- Ransted, David (November 2025). "Database: Douglas DC-8". Aeroplane. pp. 79–101. ISSN 0143-7240.
- Whittle, John A.; Nash, H.J.; Sievers, Harry (1972). The McDonnell DC-8. Tonbridge, Kent, UK: Air-Britain. ISBN 0-85130-024-3.
