= Shanghai Aerospace Enthusiasts Center =

Aerospace museum in Shanghai, China

Coordinates: 31°8′12.76″N 121°24′24.48″E

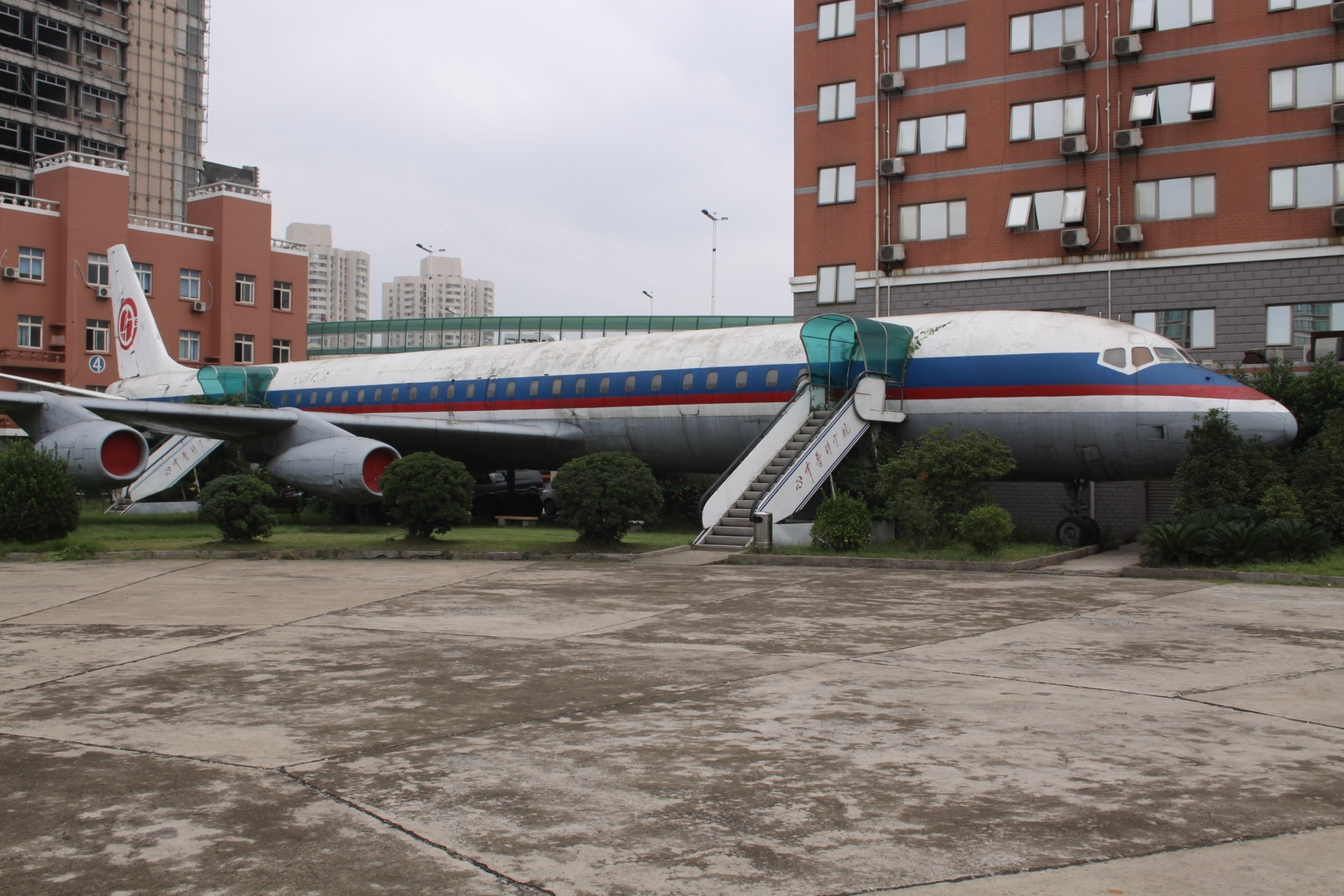
Douglas DC-8 displayed at the Shanghai Aerospace Enthusiasts Center

Shanghai Aerospace Enthusiasts Center (Chinese: 上海航宇科普中心) is an aviation history museum in Shanghai, China. It is located at 7900 Humin Road in Shanghai. It has models of aircraft and spacecraft.

== Exhibits ==
There are missiles and aircraft outside the building. The center has a 3D video room and flight simulators. Among the passenger aircraft on display is an ex-JAL DC-8 airliner (Registration: JA8048) that was involved in an accident at Shanghai in 1982. There are also Il-14 and DHC-3 on ground. Several early Chinese military aircraft on display including J-6C, J-5 and DF-102 fighters, Q-5 attack aircraft, Z-5 helicopter, CJ-6 trainer.

== Gallery ==
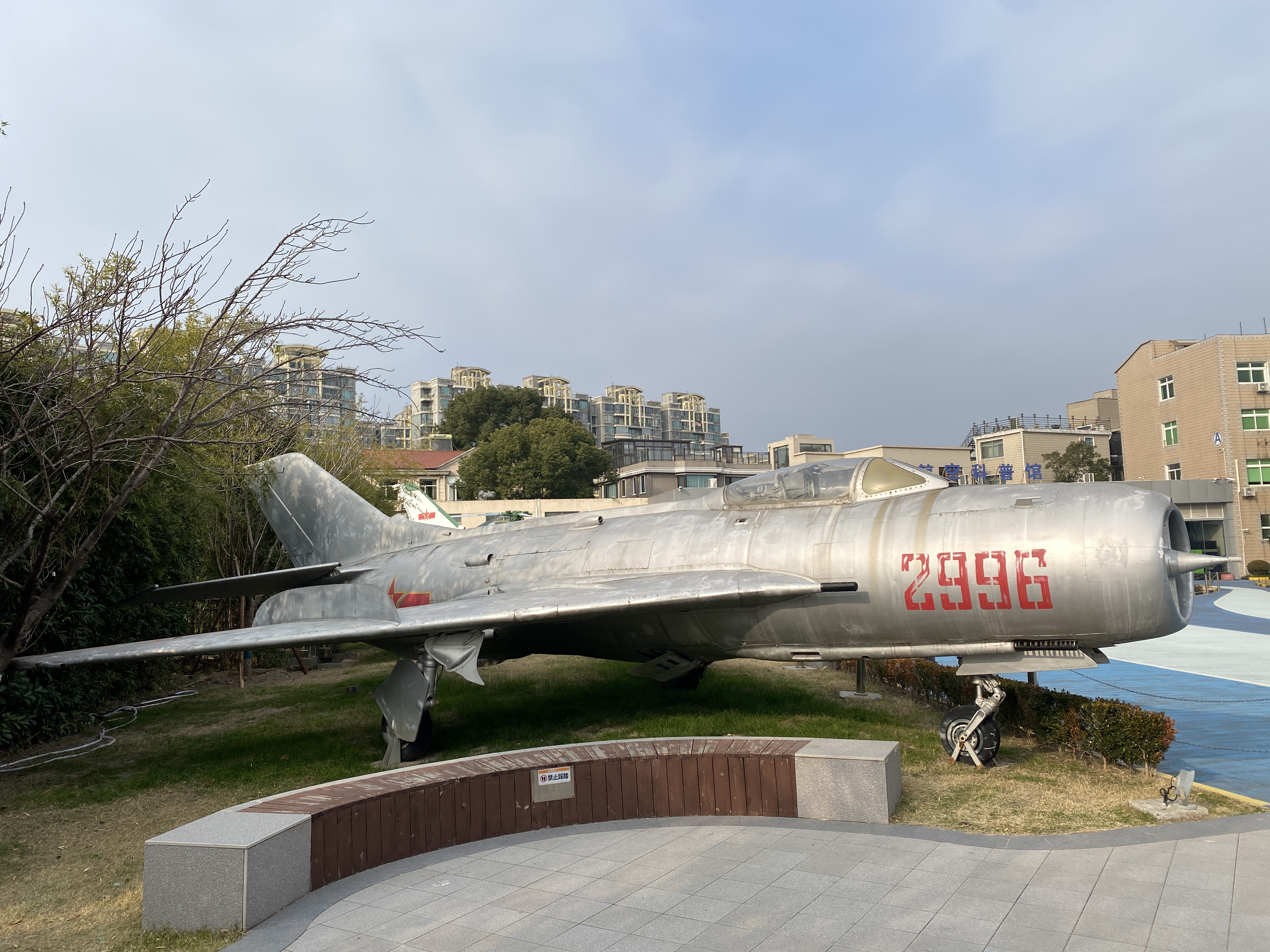
Dongfeng 102 Fighter

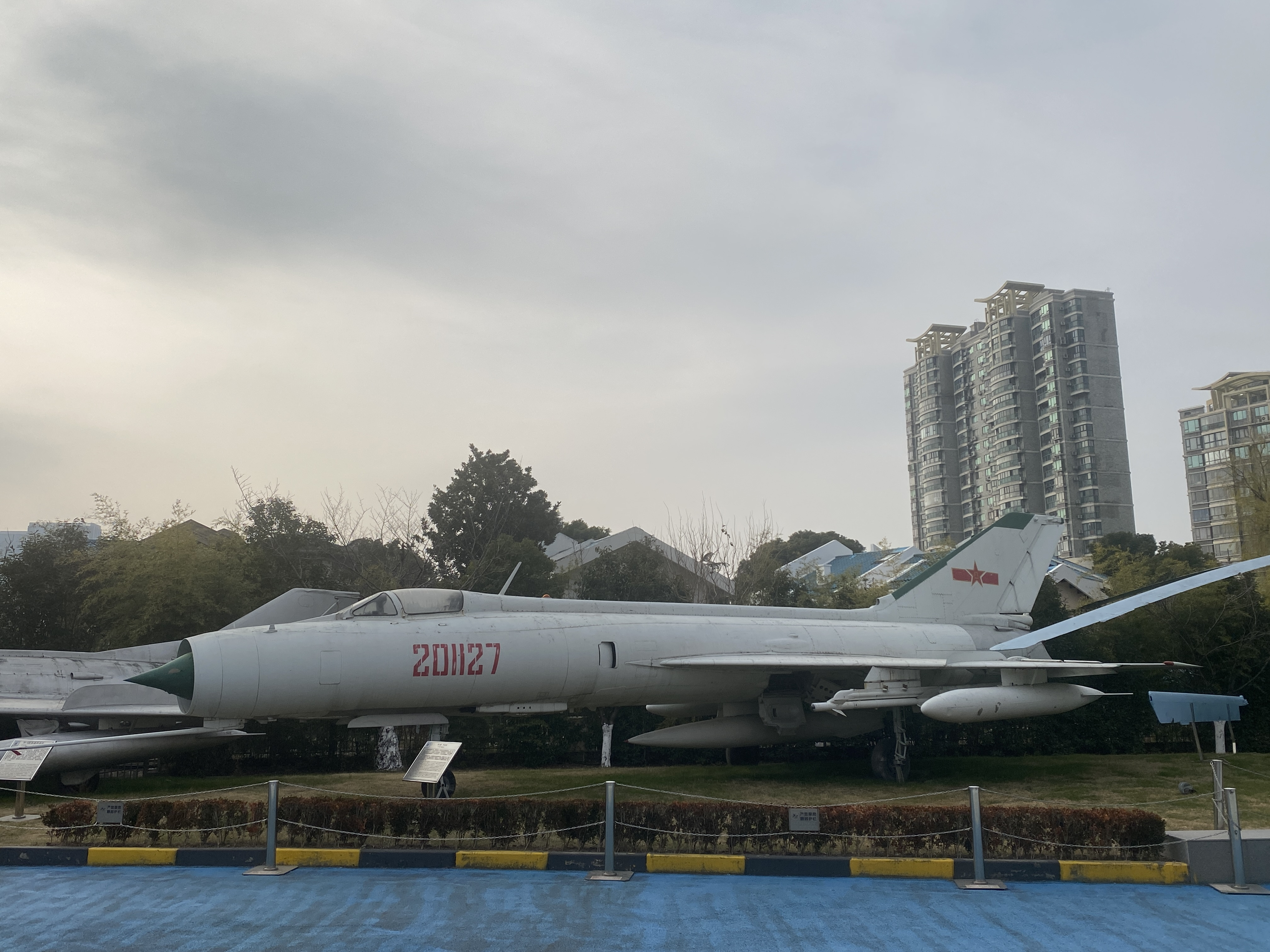
F-8E Fighter

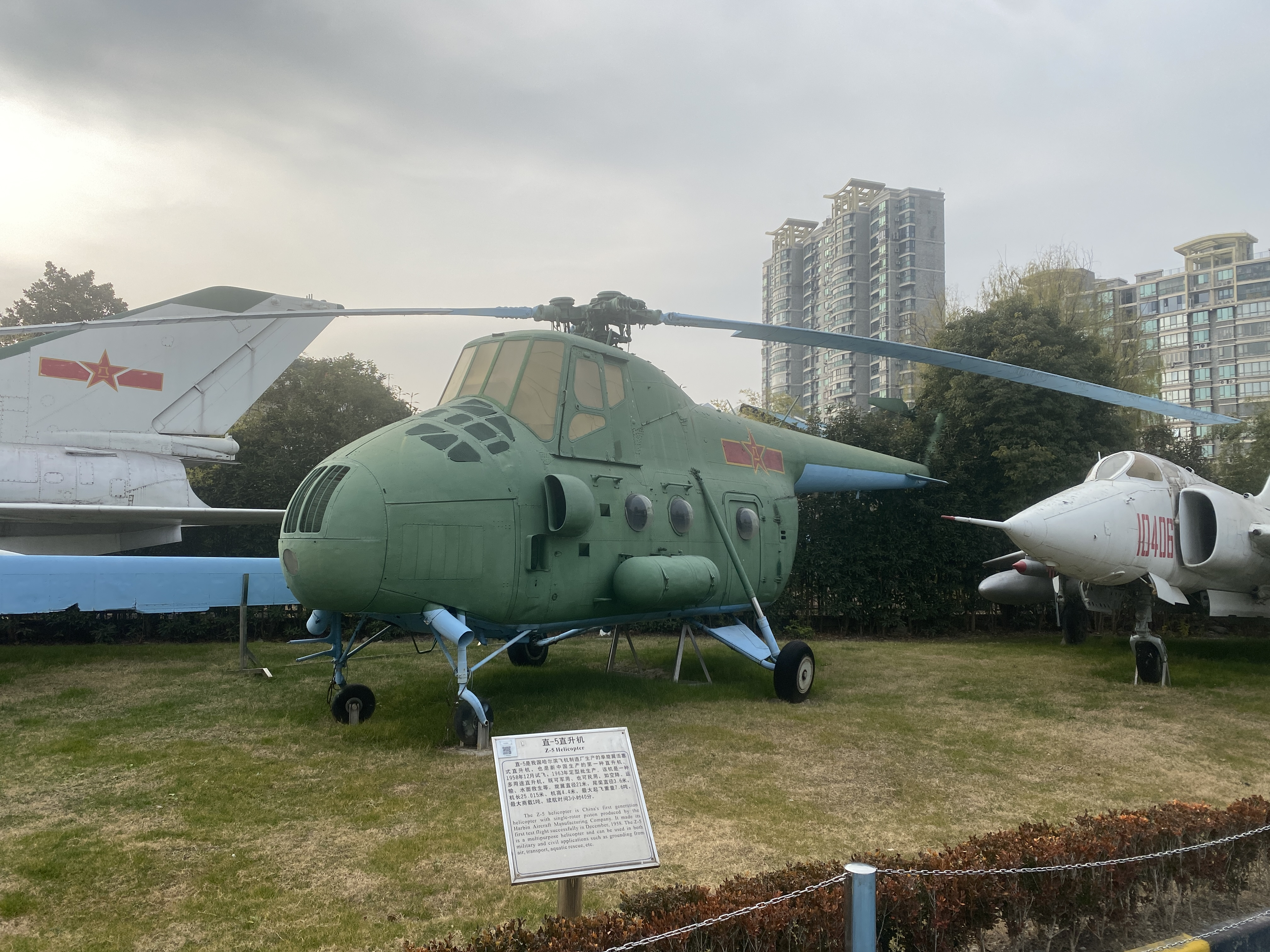
Z-5 Helicopter

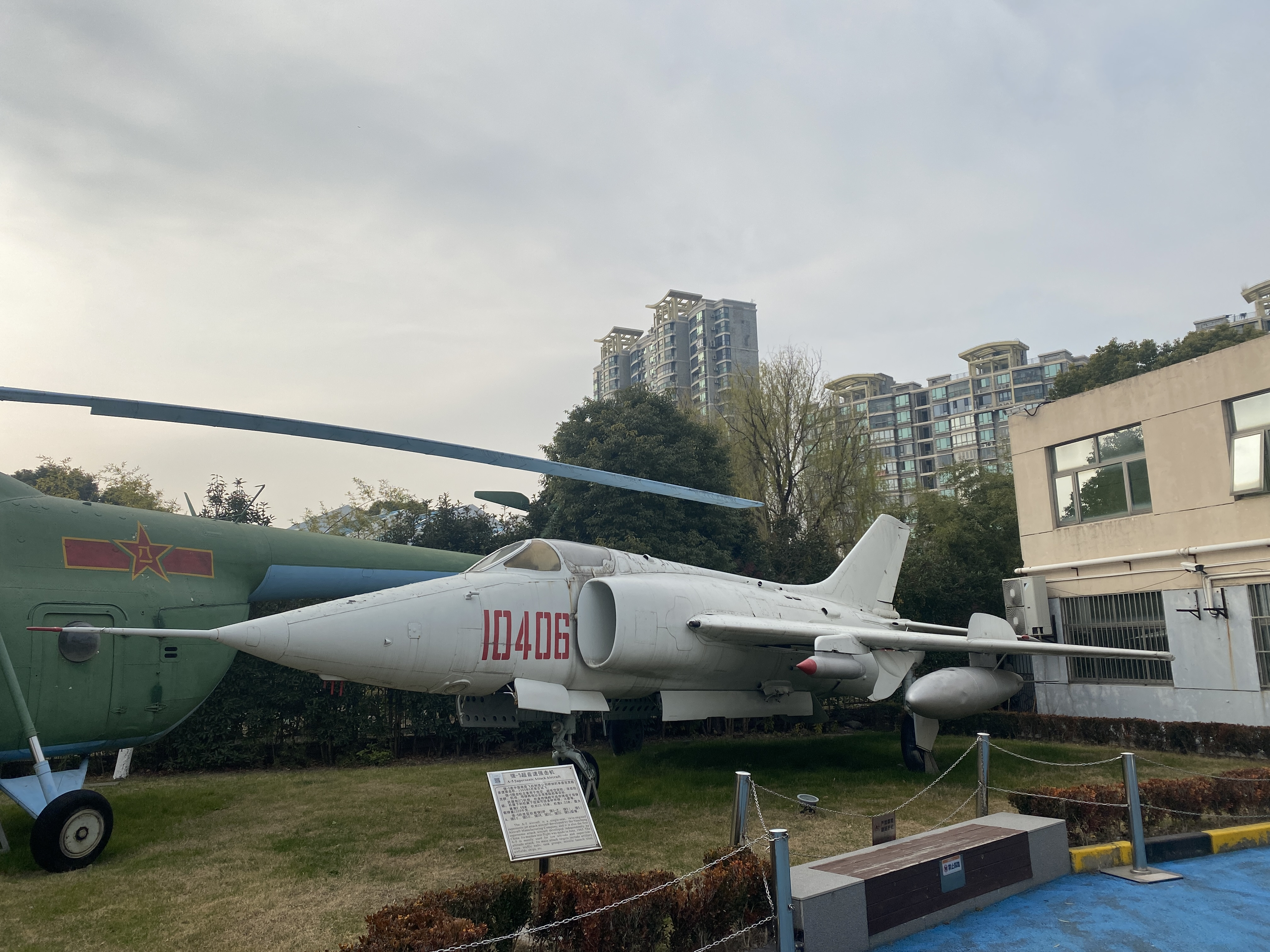
A-5 Supersonic attack Aircraft

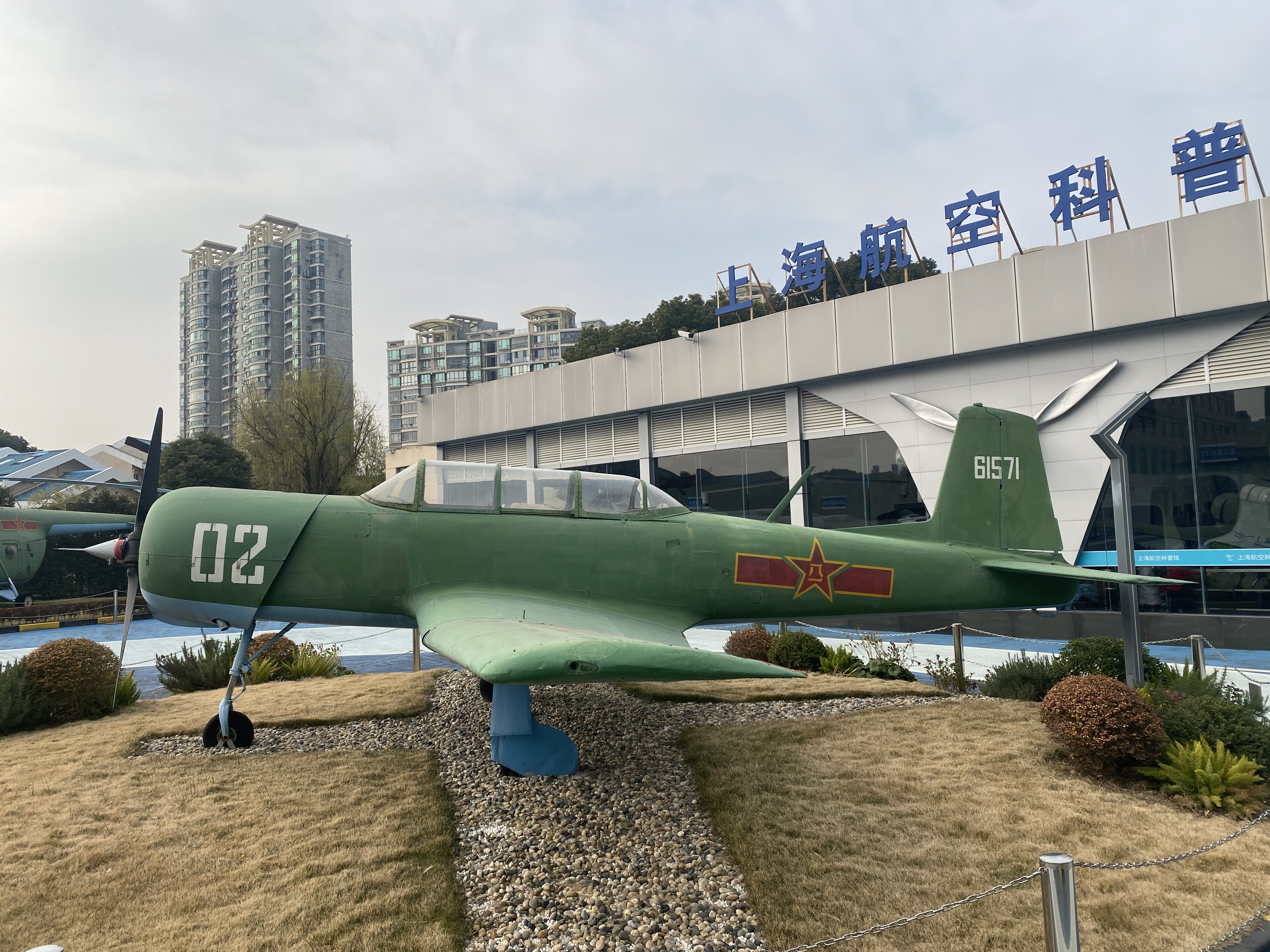
CJ-6 Primary Trainer Aircraft

== See also ==
- List of aviation museums
