= Japan Air Lines Flight 792 =

1982 aviation incident in Shanghai, China

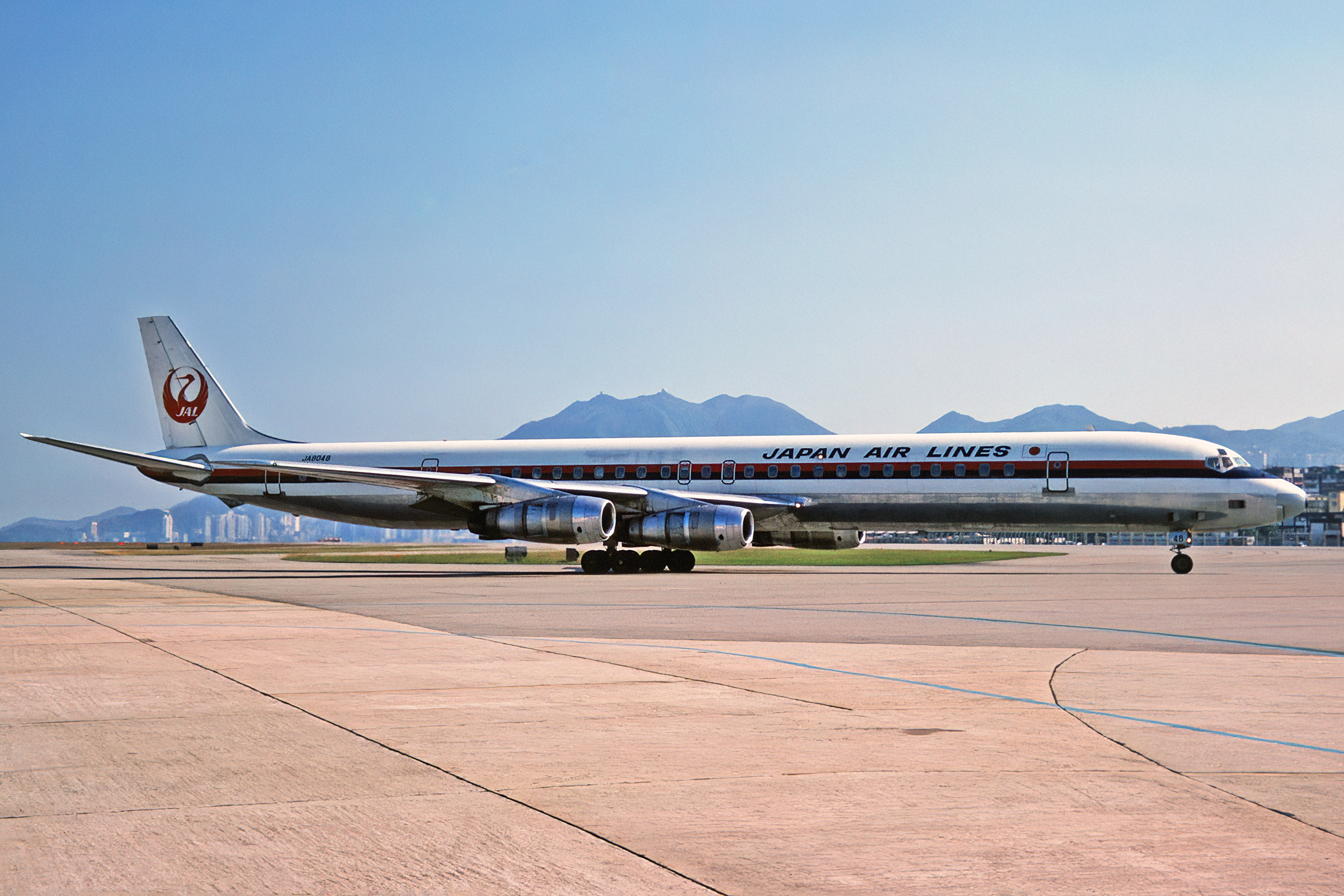
- JA8048, the aircraft involved in 1981

Accident
- Date: September 17, 1982
- Summary: Runway excursion due to broken hydraulics
- Site: Shanghai Hongqiao International Airport, Shanghai, China; 31°11′48″N 121°20′6″E

Aircraft
- Aircraft type: Douglas DC-8-61
- Operator: Japan Air Lines
- IATA flight No.: JL792
- ICAO flight No.: JAL 792
- Call sign: JAPAN AIR 792
- Registration: JA8048
- Flight origin: Shanghai Hongqiao International Airport, Shanghai, China
- Destination: New Tokyo International Airport, Narita, Chiba, Japan
- Occupants: 124
- Passengers: 113
- Crew: 11
- Fatalities: 0
- Injuries: 39
- Survivors: 124

On September 17, 1982, Japan Air Lines Flight 792 made an attempted landing back to its airport of origin, Shanghai Hongqiao International Airport, after reporting an issue in the aircraft's hydraulics soon after taking off for New Tokyo International Airport. The landing resulted in a runway excursion, which in turn led to 39 of the 124 passenger and crew being injured.

== Aircraft and crew ==
The aircraft involved in the incident was a Douglas DC-8-61 manufactured in 1971, carrying the registration JA8048. The aircraft was bought by Japan Air Lines in March of the same year. In July 1982 the aircraft was sold to Oriental Lease, who in turn leased the aircraft back to Japan Air Lines. The aircraft had undergone an overhaul in June 1982, and had received maintenance just 13 days before the incident.

The captain of Flight 792 was a 57-year-old male with 14,862 hours of experience. He was a veteran that had flown the Prime Minister before, and was recently appointed the Flight Crew Manager of Japan Air Line's DC-8s as the previous manager was sacked in the fallout of Japan Air Lines Flight 350's accident. The copilot was a 34-year-old male and the flight engineer was a 28-year-old male.

104 of the 113 passengers were Japanese, and among them were tourists who were on a tour organized by the Nicchuryokosha.

== Incident ==
Flight 792 was a regularly scheduled passenger flight from Shanghai Hongqiao International Airport and New Tokyo International Airport. The flight was scheduled to take off from Shanghai at 2PM CST, and arrive to Narita at 5:55PM JST.

The aircraft took off at 1:57PM. Ten minutes later, the air bottle ruptured as the aircraft was ascending while turning to the left, making an explosive sound. The rupture severed 15 pipes, some of which were hydraulics, resulting in the brakes and flaps to be rendered nonfunctional. As a result, the oil gauge and oil pressure gauge both dropped to zero. The pilot then switched to a backup hydraulics and began returning to the airport. However, the backup hydraulics were also damaged by the rupture, making the flaps inoperable. The pilot would go on to declare his intention to land without the use of flaps to air traffic controllers. On the other hand, the pilot did not tell the cabin attendants that the plane would be making an emergency landing, but rather that the plane would be returning to the airport due to a minor issue.

At 2:30PM, Flight 792 landed on Runway 36 at 180 knots (330 km/h). The pilot then attempted to apply the brakes, but as the hydraulics were damaged, both the normal and emergency brakes were unusable. As a result, the aircraft overran the runway for about 150 meters, before hitting a ditch. The right wing became detached, and a fire briefly occurred. According to an unnamed cabin attendant, the airplane was filled with white smoke, and there was panic in the cabin. The cabin attendants were already starting to evacuate the passengers before there was an official order from the cockpit. As a result of the accident, seven people, including the cockpit crew and a cabin attendant, was severely injured. The pilot had broken his lumbar spine while the copilot broke his thoracic spine.

The remaining passengers were placed on a special retrieval flight, and arrived to Narita at 1:30PM on the 18th.

== Investigation ==
The Civil Aviation Administration of China and the Aircraft and Railway Accidents Investigation Commission of the Japanese Ministry of Transport launched an investigation in to the accident. The investigation committee arrived at the scene on the following day of the accident, but no investigation was conducted as everyone, including those from the Chinese side, were not allowed to be near the accident scene due to fears of fire caused by leaking oil. Proper investigation was only able to start two days after the accident, and it was on that day that the aircraft's flight recorder and voice recorder was retrieved. Given the condition of the luggages, the theory of a terrorist attack was ruled out. In the early stage of the investigation, it was thought that the hydraulics itself suddenly failed, causing the accident. JA8048 received most of its maintenance at Narita, and received some brief maintenance at Shanghai, but no check was done on the hydraulic pipes. Also, there were theories pitched by some that the captain, who was in an important position within the airline, made an error due to the pressure he was going through.

Through interrogation, it was revealed that the pilot thought that the emergency brakes were still usable during the accident, as some of the hydraulics were still functioning. The pilot stated that he tried to land the plane as fast as possible before the hydraulics were completely destroyed, and opted to land without ditching the fuel. The copilot testified that, despite the reserve accumulator was showing normal readings, the brakes did not work. Also, the copilot noticed the air bottle's pressure reading was at zero, but failed to notify the pilot. Chinese investigators saw this as problematic. However, many experts stated that such a case of an air bottle rupture has never happened before, arguing that as such, noticing the issue would have been difficult.

On December 6, the investigation committee announced that the cause of the accident was the air bottle for the emergency brakes, which were made out of 41xx steel, became corroded, and ruptured after a crack had formed. There were six cracks present, and the largest crack (1.9 mm in size) developed at a spot that was only 2.3 mm thick. The cause of the crack was theorized to be faulty production.

The final investigation report stated that, had an X-ray inspection had been done on the aircraft, the corroded air bottle would have been noticed, but the maintenance manual for the aircraft did not make any mentions concerning X-ray inspections. On the other hand, the report did not touch on the mistakes the pilot made, making it inconclusive as to whether there were any elements of pilot error in this incident.

== Aftermath ==
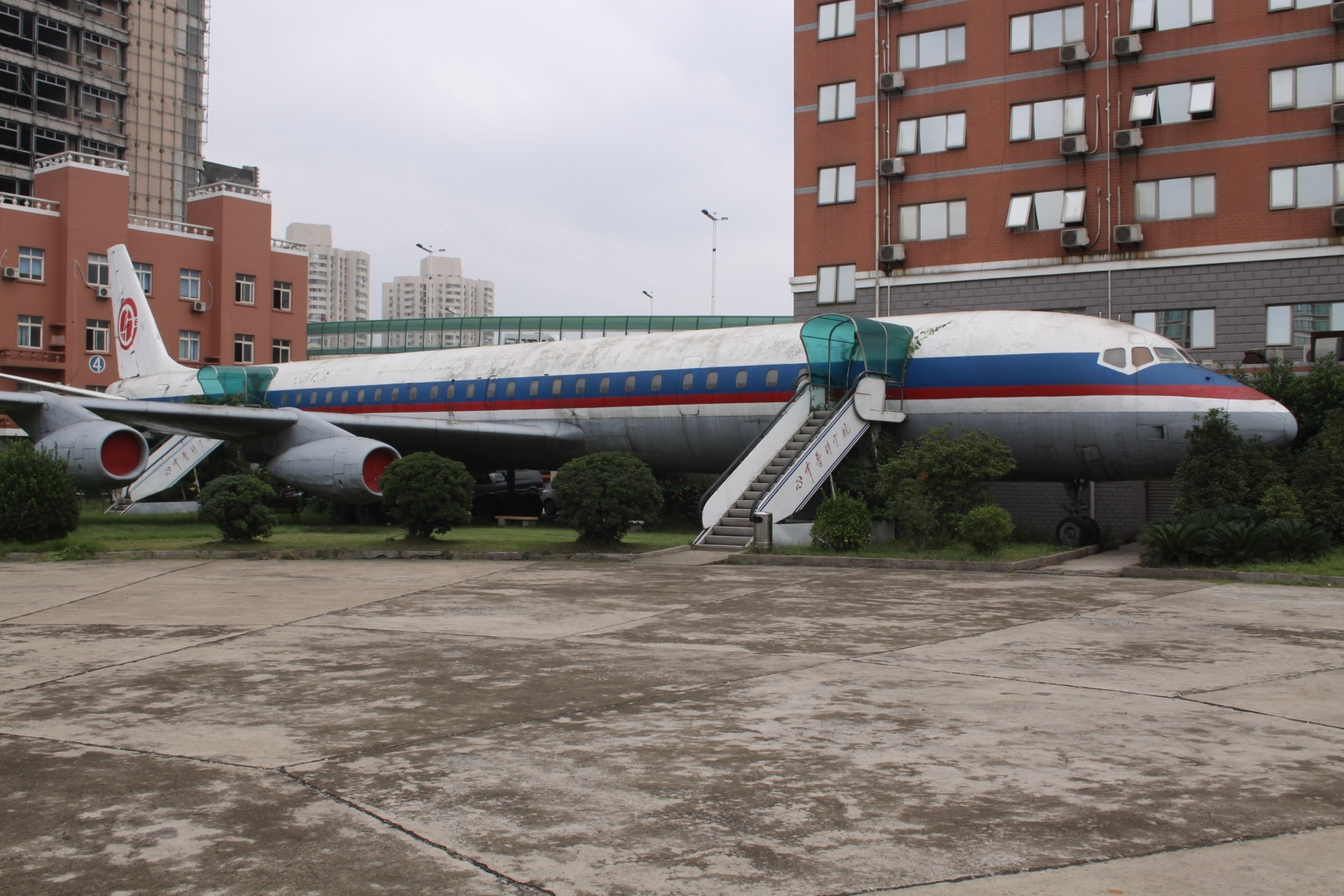
JA8048 displayed at the Shanghai Aerospace Enthusiasts Center

At the time, Japan Air Lines was involved in a string of major incidents, and Flight 792 was the fourth incident within the previous seven months, the most notable being Flight 350. On the day after the incident, the Ministry of Transportation ordered Japan Air Lines to inspect its entire DC-8 fleet. Later, on the 21st, the Ministry of Transport conducted an on-site inspection against the airline, and ordered the airline to conduct X-ray inspections to its fleet. Japan Air Lines conducted inspections on 24 aircraft, some of which were of its subsidiary's fleet, Japan Asia Airways, and reported on the 30th that no issues that could lead to an accident were found.

In response to this accident as well as those of Flight 350 and Southwest Air Lines Flight 611, the Aircraft and Railway Accidents Investigation Commission conducted a meeting on January 24, 1983 to discuss the procedures of evacuation and rescue of passengers in an emergency. The meeting discussed what passengers need to know and follow during the event of an emergency. The aircraft involved in the accident was moved to the Shanghai Aerospace Enthusiasts Center, where it is displayed outside to this day.

As of 2023, Flight 792 is no longer used by Japan Airlines on the Shanghai route, but instead on a flight between Osaka-Kansai and Honolulu.
