= National Transport & Toy Museum =

Museum in Wānaka, New Zealand

National Transport and Toy Museum
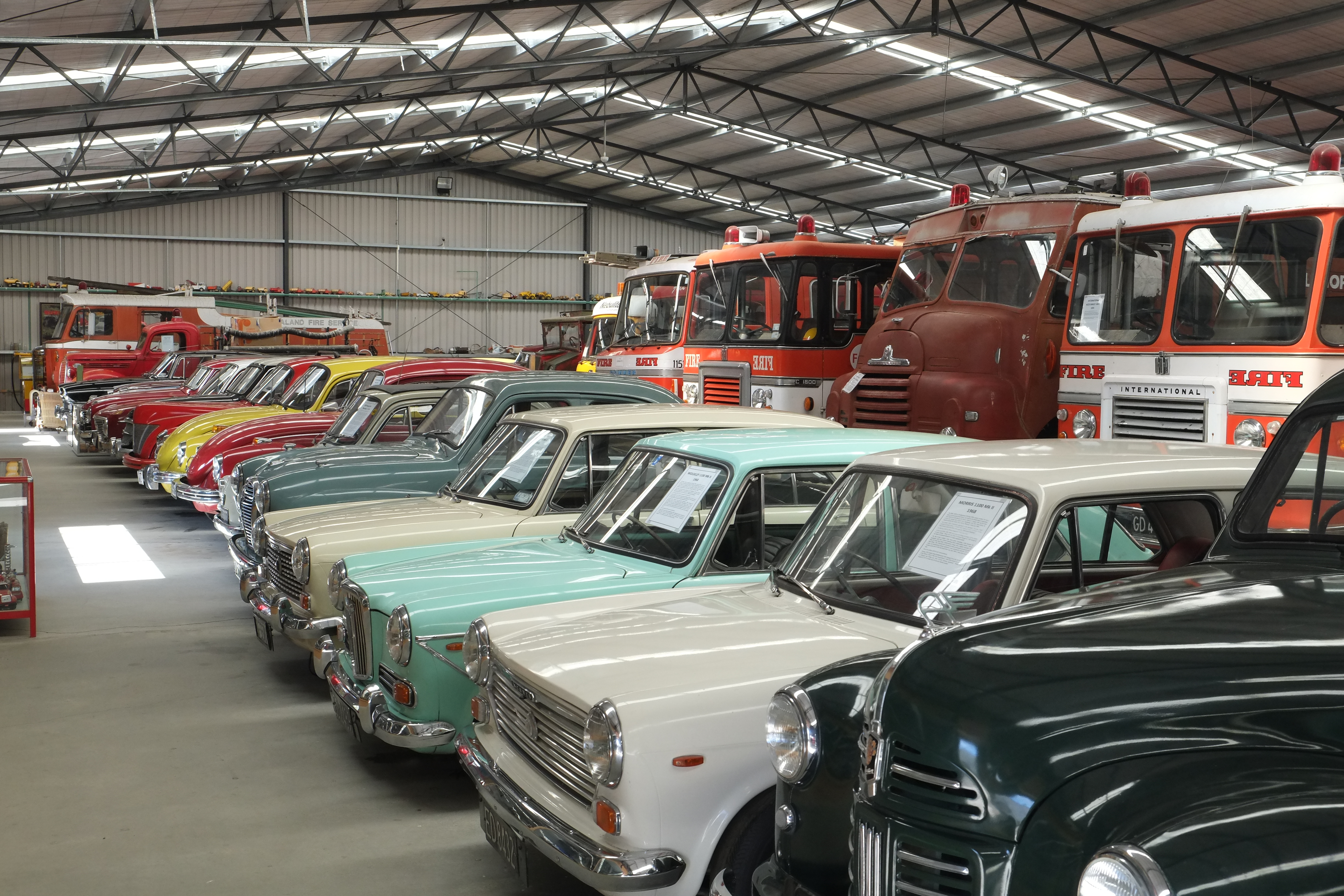
- Some of the classic cars and fire trucks at the National Transport and Toy Museum
- Former name: Wanaka Transport Museum (1995-1999), Wanaka Transport and Toy Museum (1999–2009)
- Established: 26 December 1995; 30 years ago
- Location: Wānaka, New Zealand
- Coordinates: 44.7227°S 169.2400°E
- Type: Transport museum (Toy museum)
- Founder: Gerald Rhodes
- Website: www.nttmuseumwanaka.co.nz

The National Transport and Toy Museum in Wānaka, New Zealand is one of the largest private collections in the Southern hemisphere and displays a large collection of items including over 650 vehicles, 23 aircraft and 100,000 toys plus thousands of miscellaneous items. Owned and operated by one family, the museum is located adjacent to the Wānaka Airport on State Highway 6.

The main building houses part of the toy collection, notably a very large collection of Star Wars toys and memorabilia, a display of Barbie dolls through the decades, classic wooden and metal toys, as well as teddy bears and porcelain dolls. A toy shop at the entrance also sells a range of modern toys and models.

The collections of vehicles and aircraft are on display in several large hangars. The hangars include a range of vehicles including cars, aircraft, airport ground support, construction vehicles, farm implements, farm tractors, fire engines, military vehicles, motorbikes, scooters and mopeds, pickups, trucks, horse-drawn vehicles, marine vehicles, and a range of additional miscellaneous vehicles.

Outside of the buildings, the displays continue with machinery in various states of restoration, such as a long row of tractors and farming machinery.

The museum has indoor and outdoor playing areas with adult-sized pedal cars, a play area and a range anti-aircraft guns that can be sat and moved by visitors.

== History ==
The collector, Gerald Rhodes, began collecting in Christchurch in the 1950s. Wānaka was chosen as the site for the museum due to its dry climate, proximity to the Wānaka Airport, and location on the main road (State Highway 6). Building commenced on the museum in 1994 and the museum opened to the public on Boxing Day (26 December 1995 (30 years ago)).

The Museum opened with two buildings - The Main building and The Hangar. As the collection grew more buildings were needed and in April 2004 a 1440sqm building "The Fire Station" was built, 2005 Hangar 2 a 2000sqm building and in 2023 saw the erection of a 2600sqm Marquee.

On opening the museum was called the Wanaka Transport Museum then as the toy collection grew became the Wanaka Transport & Toy Museum before re-branding in 2010 to the current name of the National Transport and Toy Museum.
