= Naval Air Museum Barbers Point =

- Established: 1999
- Coordinates: 21.3148°N 158.0762°W
- Type: Military museum
- Executive director: Brad Hayes
- Website: nambp.org

Naval Air Museum Barbers Point was a military museum in Kapolei, Hawaii.

The museum preserved the history of the co-located Naval Air Station Barbers Point. Its exhibits included former U.S. Navy, U.S. Coast Guard, and U.S. Marine Corps aircraft including the McDonnell Douglas F-4 Phantom II, Douglas A-4 Skyhawk, Lockheed P-3C Orion, and Sikorsky UH-3H Sea King, among others.

Established in 1999, the museum was forced to close in June 2020 after longstanding difficulties with the State of Hawaii.
