= Navegação Aérea Brasileira =

Brazilian airline

NAB – Navegação Aérea Brasileira
- Founded: 1938
- Commenced operations: 1941
- Ceased operations: 1961
- Key people: Orsini de Araújo Coriolano; Paulo Venâncio da Rocha Vianna; Evaldo Kós; Dilvo Peres

NAB – Navegação Aérea Brasileira was a Brazilian airline founded in 1938. In 1961 it was sold to Lóide Aéreo Nacional.

== History ==
NAB was founded on January 28, 1938. The founder Paulo Venâncio da Rocha Vianna initially invested heavily in technical training for both land and air staff conducted particularly by TWA. Thus in the beginning NAB followed what was most modern in terms of aviation technology and administration at its time. Its first aircraft arrived in 1941 and operated between Rio de Janeiro and Recife via Belo Horizonte, Bom Jesus da Lapa and Petrolina. In order to operate the route NAB invested in upgrading the airport facilities of Bom Jesus da Lapa and Petrolina.

Later NAB tried also to fly between Rio de Janeiro and Recife via the coast but it had no success due to the fierce competition with Serviços Aéreos Condor (later Cruzeiro do Sul) and Panair do Brasil.

Because of financial difficulties, the Brazilian government granted three successive subventions, which were used to enlarge the fleet and extend the network.

The end of World War II brought a boom in the creation of new airlines in Brazil and due to fierce competition, in order to survive, NAB was granted further two loans.

In March 1948 all services were suspended and NAB was closed on August 17, 1948. This was however not the end: the Federal Government decided to take over NAB and continue services in the states of Rio de Janeiro, Minas Gerais and Espírito Santo. Thus the airline continued its struggle for survival.

In 1957 the entrepreneur Dilvo Peres decided to invest in the airline, re-organizing its administration, buying new aircraft, and establishing an operational partnership with Panair do Brasil. The efforts were not successful and in a last attempt to survive, NAB started selling greatly discounted tickets and in-flight service was reduced to a minimum.

On October 24, 1961 Lóide Aéreo Nacional bought NAB.

== Destinations ==
NAB served, among others, the following cities:

- Belém – Val de Cães International Airport
- Belo Horizonte – Pampulha Airport
- Bom Jesus da Lapa – Bom Jesus da Lapa Airport
- Cachoeiro de Itapemirim – Cachoeiro de Itapemirim Airport
- Fortaleza – Pinto Martins International Airport
- Governador Valadares – Governador Valadares Airport
- João Pessoa – Presidente Castro Pinto International Airport
- Montes Claros – Montes Claros Airport
- Petrolina – Petrolina Airport
- Recife – Guararapes International Airport
- Rio de Janeiro – Santos Dumont Airport
- São Luís – Tirirical Airport
- Teresina – Teresina Airport
- Vitória – Goiabeiras Airport

== Fleet ==
NAB fleet
Aircraft	Total	Years of operation	Notes
Beechcraft B18S	2	1941–1958	
Beechcraft D17S	1	1941–1957	
Fairchild 24W41	1	1942–1950	
Lockheed Model 18 Lodestar	5	1943–1948	
Stinson SR-9E Reliant	1	1942–1943	
Douglas DC-3/C-47	15	1946–1961	
Curtiss-Wright C-46 Commando	7	1959–1961	

== Accidents and incidents ==
- 15 February 1945: a Lockheed 18-10 Lodestar registration PP-NAE crashed near the location of Lagoa Santa. All 11 occupants died.
- May 3, 1960: a NAB Curtiss C-46 Commando crashed into a small hill on approach to Ramey Air Force Base in Aguadilla, Puerto Rico, during a delivery flight from Miami. All five occupants were killed.

== See also ==
- List of defunct airlines of Brazil
