= Linhas Aéreas Paulistas =

Brazilian airline

- Founded: 1943
- Commenced operations: 1946
- Ceased operations: 1951

Linhas Aéreas Paulistas (LAP) was a Brazilian airline founded in 1943. In 1951 it was bought and merged into Lóide Aéreo Nacional.

== History ==
Linhas Aéreas Paulistas (LAP) S.A. was founded in 1943 but the first meeting of shareholders took place only on February 9, 1945. In June 1945 LAP was given authorization to operate and in 1946 flights from São Paulo to Recife via the coast started. Later, flights were extended beyond Recife, to Campina Grande.

In February 1947 LAP started to operate also between São Paulo-Congonhas and Rio de Janeiro-Santos Dumont. In 1948 services were extended to Fortaleza and Natal. In 1951 Lóide Aéreo Nacional bought the airline.

== Destinations ==
In 1946 LAP served the following cities:

Country	City	Airport	Notes
Brazil	Aracaju	Santa Maria Airport	
Brazil	Campina Grande	Campina Grande Airport	
Brazil	Fortaleza	Pinto Martins International Airport	
Brazil	Maceió	Palmares Airport	
Brazil	Natal	Augusto Severo International Airport	
Brazil	Recife	Guararapes International Airport	
Brazil	Rio de Janeiro	Santos Dumont Airport	
Brazil	São Paulo	Congonhas Airport	

== Fleet ==
LAP fleet
Aircraft	Total	Years of operation	Notes
Lockheed Model 14 Super Electra	1	1945–1947	
Douglas DC-3/C-47	5	1946–1951	
Curtiss C-46 Commando	1	1951–1954	

== Accidents and incidents ==
- 12 July 1951: a Douglas DC-3/C-47 registration PP-LPG, operating a flight for Lóide Aéreo Nacional but still registered under LAP, flying from Maceió to Aracaju, after aborting a landing in adverse conditions in Aracaju, overflew the runway and initiated a turn in low altitude to the right. The aircraft crashed during this turn. All 33 passengers and crew died, including the Governor of the state of Rio Grande do Norte Jerônimo Dix-sept Rosado Maia, causing this accident to be the 2nd deadliest accident in Brazil at the time.

== See also ==
- List of defunct airlines of Brazil
