= Lóide Aéreo Nacional Flight 652 =

1958 aviation accident in Brazil

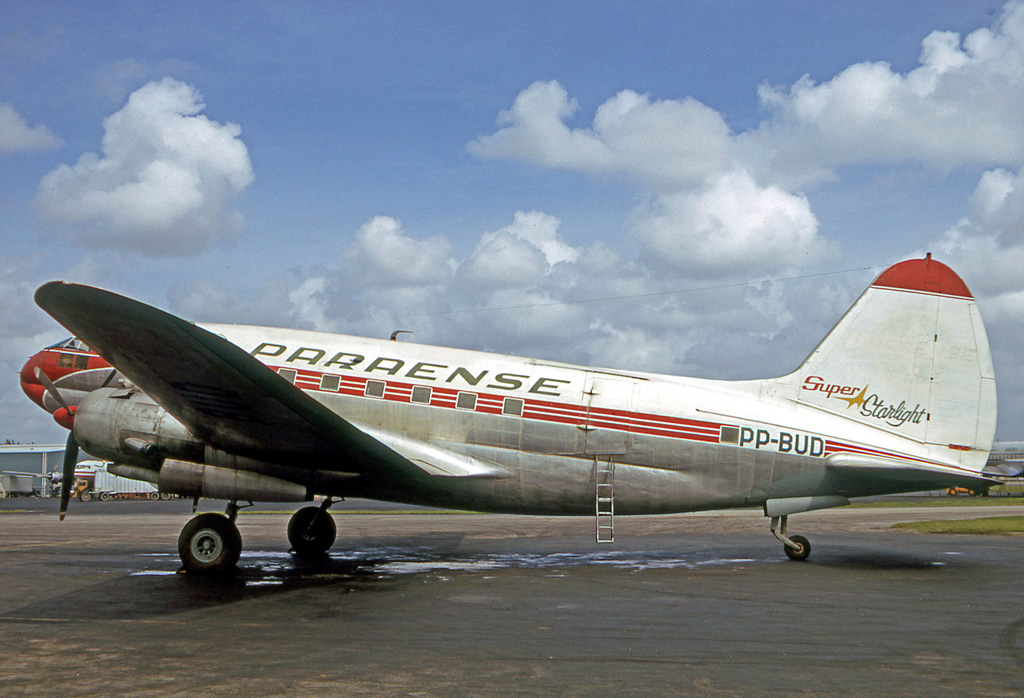
- A Curtiss C-46 Commando similar to the one involved

Accident
- Date: 5 September 1958
- Summary: Controlled flight into terrain during approach due to pilot error and inclement weather
- Site: near Campina Grande Airport, Campina Grande, Brazil

Aircraft
- Aircraft type: Curtiss C-46D-15-CU
- Operator: Lóide Aéreo Nacional
- Registration: PP-LDX
- Flight origin: Santos Dumont Airport, Rio de Janeiro, Brazil
- Stopover: Goiabeiras Airport, Vitória, Espírito Santo, Brazil
- 1st stopover: Ilhéus Jorge Amado Airport, Ilhéus, Brazil
- 2nd stopover: Salvador Bahia Airport, Salvador, Brazil
- 3rd stopover: Santa Maria Airport, Aracaju, Brazil
- 4th stopover: Campo dos Palmares Airport, Maceió, Brazil
- 5th stopover: Recife/Guararapes International Airport, Recife, Brazil
- 6th stopover: Augusto Severo International Airport, Natal, Parnamirim, Brazil
- Last stopover: Campina Grande Airport, Campina Grande, Brazil
- Destination: Fortaleza Airport, Fortaleza, Brazil
- Occupants: 40
- Passengers: 37
- Crew: 3
- Fatalities: 13
- Injuries: 27 (5 severe)
- Survivors: 27

Lóide Aéreo Nacional Flight 652 was a domestic passenger flight from Rio de Janeiro to Fortaleza, Brazil, with intermediate stopovers in Vitória, Ilhéus, Salvador, Aracaju, Maceió, Recife, Natal, and Campina Grande. On 5 September 1958, the Curtiss C-46 operating the flight crashed into the ground, killing 13 (11 passengers and 2 crew members) of the 40 people on board.

== Accident ==
Due to the rainy and overcast weather, with impaired visibility, several unsuccessful landing attempts were made at the then Campina Grande Airport. On the final approach, the aircraft was flying below the approach ceiling and crashed into the ground, on a field on the left bank of the Trans-Amazonian Highway, in Bodocongó. Among the dead were the pilot and the radio operator, a doctor, an architect and a manager of Banco do Brasil. One of the survivors of the accident was then law student Renato Aragão. The crew brought the plane up to 750 meters (2,460 feet). Upon reaching this altitude, they made a turn above the station, intercepting the outbound track. The captain maintained altitude up to the end of the base turn, when, starting the return, on heading 200 degrees, he began to descend, turning on the aircraft lights. The co-pilot was still unable to obtain visual reference. The plane then crashed into the ground.

The victims were rescued by the Fire Department and taken to Pedro I Hospital, regional emergency rooms and Ipase, in serious condition. Due to the difficult access to the location, the firefighters' rescue work was extremely challenging. Some of the aircraft wreckage was stolen by local residents near the crash site.

A memorial shrine was built at the site of the accident.

== Investigation ==
According to the final report, the pilots descended without clearance and were at an altitude lower than required for the approach to the airport. The pilot tried to gain sight of the runway by scanning the ground visually, but this method failed. The crew brought the plane up to 750 meters (2,460 feet). Upon reaching this altitude, they made a turn above the station, intercepting the outbound track. The captain maintained altitude up to the end of the base turn, when, starting the return, on heading 200 degrees, he began to descend, turning on the aircraft lights. The co-pilot was still unable to obtain visual references with the ground and unable to find the runway.

It was also found that the approach procedure carried out by the crew was not in accordance with that indicated in the approach chart approved by the Directorate of Air Routes. It was also found that the aircraft encountered inclement weather conditions, with heavy cloud cover and rain, despite the departure controller stating the weather conditions prior to the flight as acceptable with a high cloud cover and good visibility.

The final report concluded that the probable cause of the crash was due to pilot error, specifically the crew following an improper procedure during an ILS approach to the runway. In addition, the misleading weather information given by the departure controller prior to takeoff resulted in the crew unable to see other planes or the runway environment ahead of them.
