= Lóide Aéreo Nacional =

Brazilian airline, 1949–1962

- Founded: 1947 (as TCA); 1949 (as Lóide Aéreo Nacional)
- Ceased operations: 1962 (Incorporated into VASP)
- Fleet size: 82 (In Total)
- Destinations: 22
- Key people: Ruy Vacani

Lóide Aéreo Nacional S/A was a Brazilian airline founded in 1947 as Transporte Carga Aérea (TCA). It was renamed Lóide Aéreo Nacional in 1949, after it merged with Linhas Aéreas Paulistas (LAP) and Transportes Aéreos Bandeirantes (TABA). It operated until 1962 when it was incorporated into VASP.

== History ==
On December 22, 1947, Ruy Vacani founded the airline TCA – Transportes Carga Aérea S.A. in Anápolis, State of Goiás, Brazil, an airline specialized in transportation of cargo. Previously, in 1928, Vacani had also founded ETA - Empresa de Transporte Aéreo an airline that lasted for only for one year, being sold to NYRBA do Brasil. Vacani had good political connections with the then president Getúlio Vargas, who apparently favored his business. Shareholders of the airline also included Roberto Taves, one of the founders of Aerovias Brasil and Colonel Marcílio Jacques Gibson who in 1976 founded TABA – Transportes Aéreos da Bacia Amazônica.

On August 24, 1949, TCA had its name changed to Lóide Aéreo Nacional and started regular passenger flights using Curtiss C-46 Commando aircraft, flying from Rio de Janeiro to São Luís or Fortaleza with intermediate stops. Its operations later grew to include the whole Brazilian territory.

In 1951 Lóide Aéreo Nacional incorporated the airlines, Linhas Aéreas Paulistas – LAP and TABA – Transportes Aéreos Bandeirantes, and in 1961 NAB – Navegação Aérea Brasileira.

Between 1956 and 1958 Lóide Aéreo Nacional and Panair do Brasil had an agreement to avoid harmful competition, in which the Brazilian territory was divided into areas of influence. It also included leasing of aircraft.

Business started to decline in 1960 and finally, in 1962 Lóide Aéreo Nacional was sold and merged into VASP.

== Destinations ==
In January 1956, the network of Lóide Aéreo Nacional comprised 22 locations.

== Fleet ==
Lóide Aéreo Nacional fleet
Aircraft	Total	Years of operation	Notes
Douglas DC-3/C-47	3	1948–1951	
Curtiss C-46 Commando	33	1949–1962	
Douglas DC-4	10	1957–1962	
Douglas DC-6A	4	1961–1962	

== Accidents and incidents ==
Accidents involving fatalities

- 12 July 1951: a Douglas DC-3/C-47 registration PP-LPG, still registered under Linhas Aéreas Paulistas – LAP, flying from Maceió to Aracaju, after aborting a landing in adverse conditions in Aracaju, overflew the runway and initiated a turn in low altitude to the right. The aircraft crashed during this turn. All 33 passengers and crew died, including the Governor of the state of Rio Grande do Norte Jerônimo Dix-sept Rosado Maia.
- 29 July 1951: a Curtiss C-46A-10-CU Commando registration CB-39, flying from Cochabamba to Rio de Janeiro, probably operating a delivery ferry-flight still bearing the Bolivian registration number, crashed upon take-off. All 7 occupants died.
- 24 May 1952: a Curtiss C-46D-15-CU Commando registration PP-LDE, during take-off from Manaus-Ponta Pelada stalled when trying to return to the airport following an engine failure. It crashed into the Rio Negro. The 6 occupants died.
- 1 February 1958: a Douglas DC-4 registration PP-LEM operating the night flight 730 to Fortaleza, during takeoff from Rio de Janeiro-Santos Dumont experienced a failure on engine no. 4. Takeoff was aborted and 100m before the end of the runway, a tire from the landing gear burst, causing the aircraft to run off the side of the runway and burst into flames. Of the 72 passengers and crew aboard, 5 died.
- 11 August 1958: a Douglas DC-4 registration PP-LEQ crashed for unknown causes over Carapí Island, Pará while on a night time visual approach to Belém-Val de Cans. Of the 11 passengers and crew aboard, 1 passenger survived.
- 5 September 1958: a Curtiss C-46D-15-CU Commando registration PP-LDX operating flight 652 from Recife crashed during approach to Campina Grande Airport. Of a total of 18 people aboard, 2 crew members and 11 passengers died.

== See also ==
- List of defunct airlines of Brazil
