= 1st Brazilian Fighter Squadron =

Aviation group of the Brazilian Air Force

1st Fighter Aviation Group 1º Grupo de Aviação de Caça
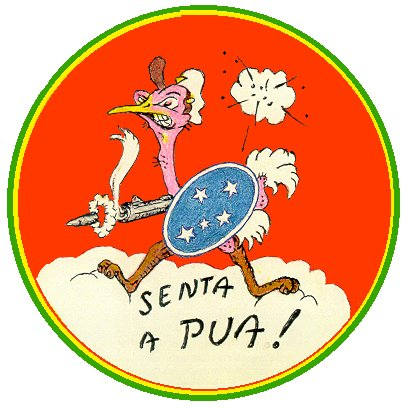
- Insignia of the 1st Fighter Aviation Group
- Active: 1943-present
- Country: Brazil
- Branch: Força Aérea Brasileira
- Garrison/HQ: Base Aérea de Santa Cruz
- Mascot: Ostrich
- Anniversaries: December 18
- Engagements: World War II; Battle of the Atlantic; Italian campaign; Spring 1945 offensive in Italy; Battle of Bologna; Battle of Garfagnana

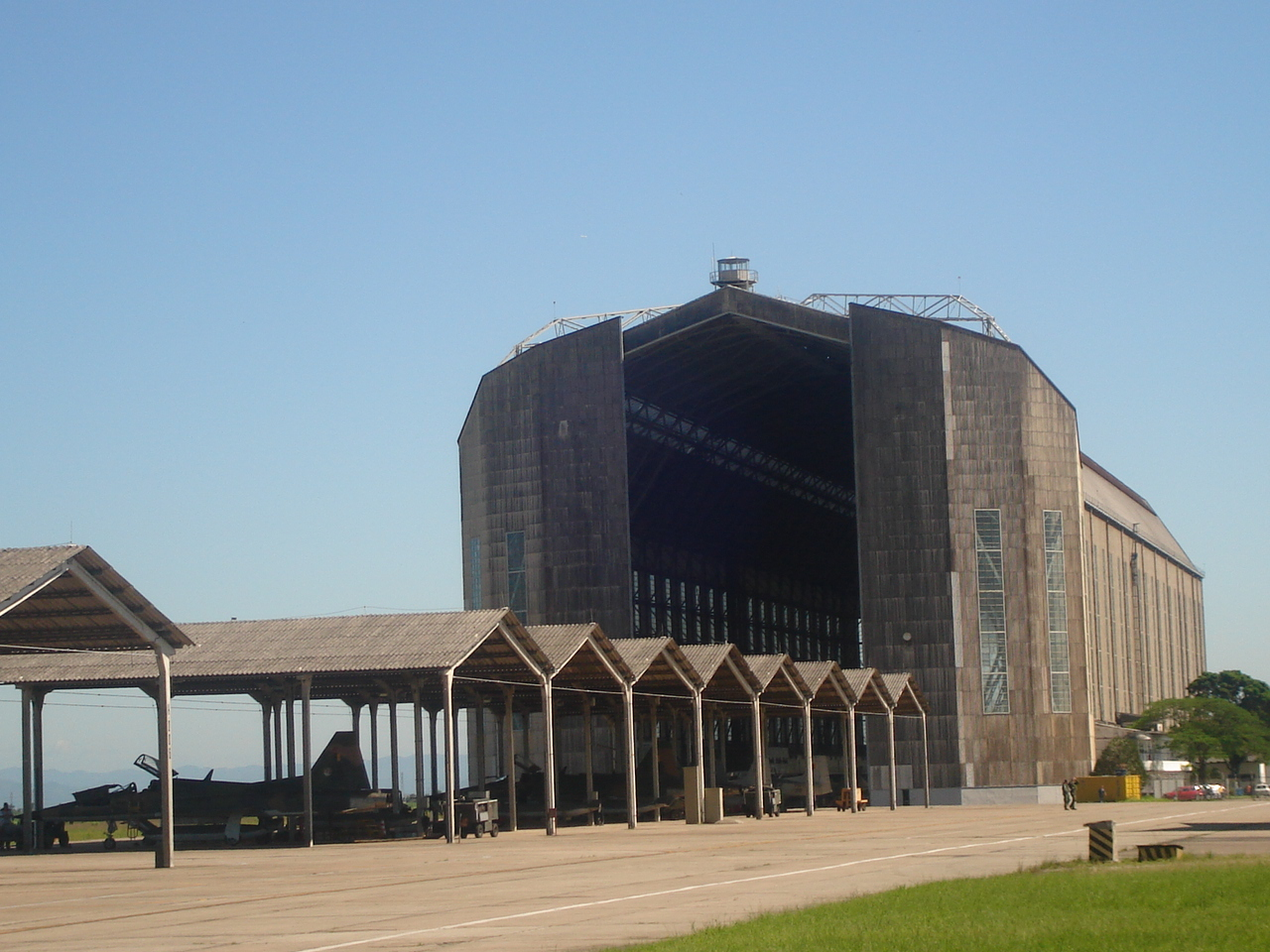
Hangar at Santa Cruz Air Base.

The 1st Fighter Aviation Group (Portuguese: 1º Grupo de Aviação de Caça, 1st GAvCa) is the first fighter aviation group of the Brazilian Air Force, well known for having participated in the Second World War in the Italian Campaign and in the South Atlantic Campaign, it was created by the first Minister of Aeronautics and first Commander of the Brazilian Air Force, Joaquim Pedro Salgado Filho and Major Nero Moura and aeronautical engineer and Major José Vicente Faria Lima. It is very well known in popular culture for its battle cry, Senta a Púa! (literal translation: "Send a Bullet!")

== History ==
=== Squadron creation ===
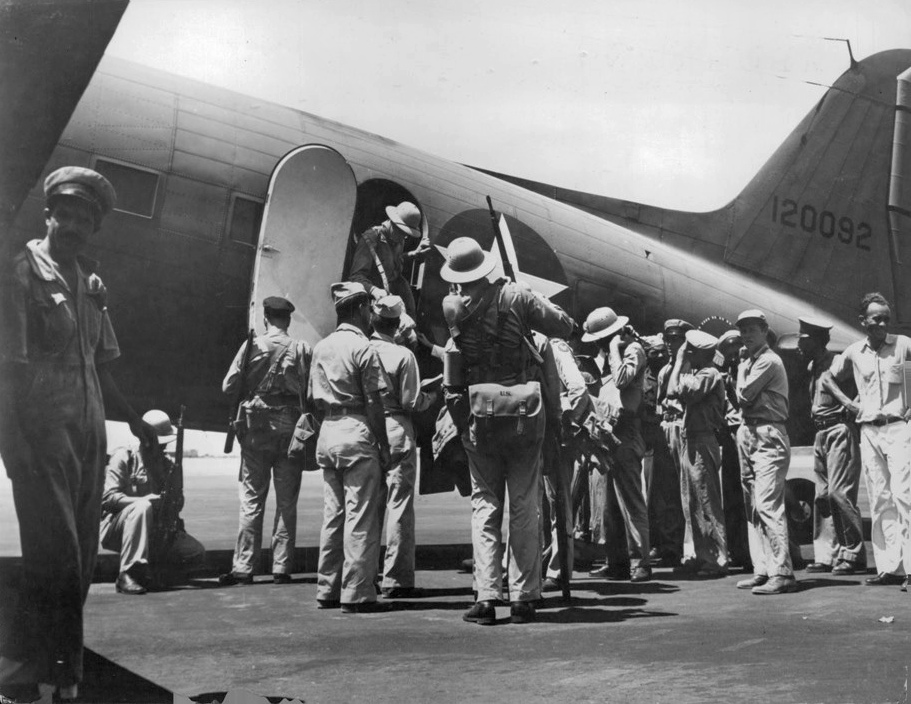
American and Brazilian forces at Natal Air Base.

With the outbreak of World War II in September 1939 after the invasion of Poland, many countries around the world became involved, including the United States in 1941 after the attack on Pearl Harbor. After the United States entered the war, it was only a matter of time before Brazil entered the war.

On January 20, 1941, with the intention of strengthening the Brazilian Air Force, the Ministry of Aeronautics was founded by the lawyer and politician Joaquim Pedro Salgado Filho, by Major Nero Moura, by the military engineer José Vicente Faria Lima and others including Nélson Freire Lavanère-Wanderley. Together with the Ministry of Aeronautics, the National Air Force was created, which would later be called Brazilian Air Force (FAB).

The following year, on August 26, 1942, Brazil declared war on Axis forces after a series of attacks on merchant ships and with that began a series of preparations so that Brazil could enter the war, with that on December 18, 1943, Decree No. 6123 was issued, which gave rise to the 1st Fighter Aviation Group (1st GAvCa). The Minister of Aeronautics, Salgado Filho, wanted to choose Faria Lima as Commander of the group, but Nero Moura argued saying that if Faria Lima were shot down they would lose an engineer and aviator, but if they lost him they would lose only one aviator, so Nero Moura was appointed Commander of the squadron, with Nélson Freire Lavanère-Wanderley as Lieutenant Colonel and Faria Lima as Symbolic Commander for his achievements to create the FAB, acting as Cabinet Officer of the Minister of Aeronautics.

After the leaders of the 1st Fighter Aviation Group were integrated into the new corporation, a training process began so that the air forces were well prepared to go to war, Major Nero Moura went to Orlando to negotiate agreements with the United States government. to begin FAB training internships in Panama and the United States.

Major Nero Moura started a search for pilots who were experts in all flight categories and who wanted to volunteer across the country in the war. Among the new members of the body, the first non-commissioned officers, 16 officers and 16 sergeants were chosen. After the first stage, the second now was that each sergeant and officer was responsible for a task, such as the selection of auxiliaries, the Squadron Leaders and the choice of pilots; to the non-commissioned officers, they were assigned to heads of maintenance, supply, armament, communication, intelligence and also medical service, after the function of each one was established, the 1st Fighter Aviation Group was ready.

=== Training in Panama and the United States ===
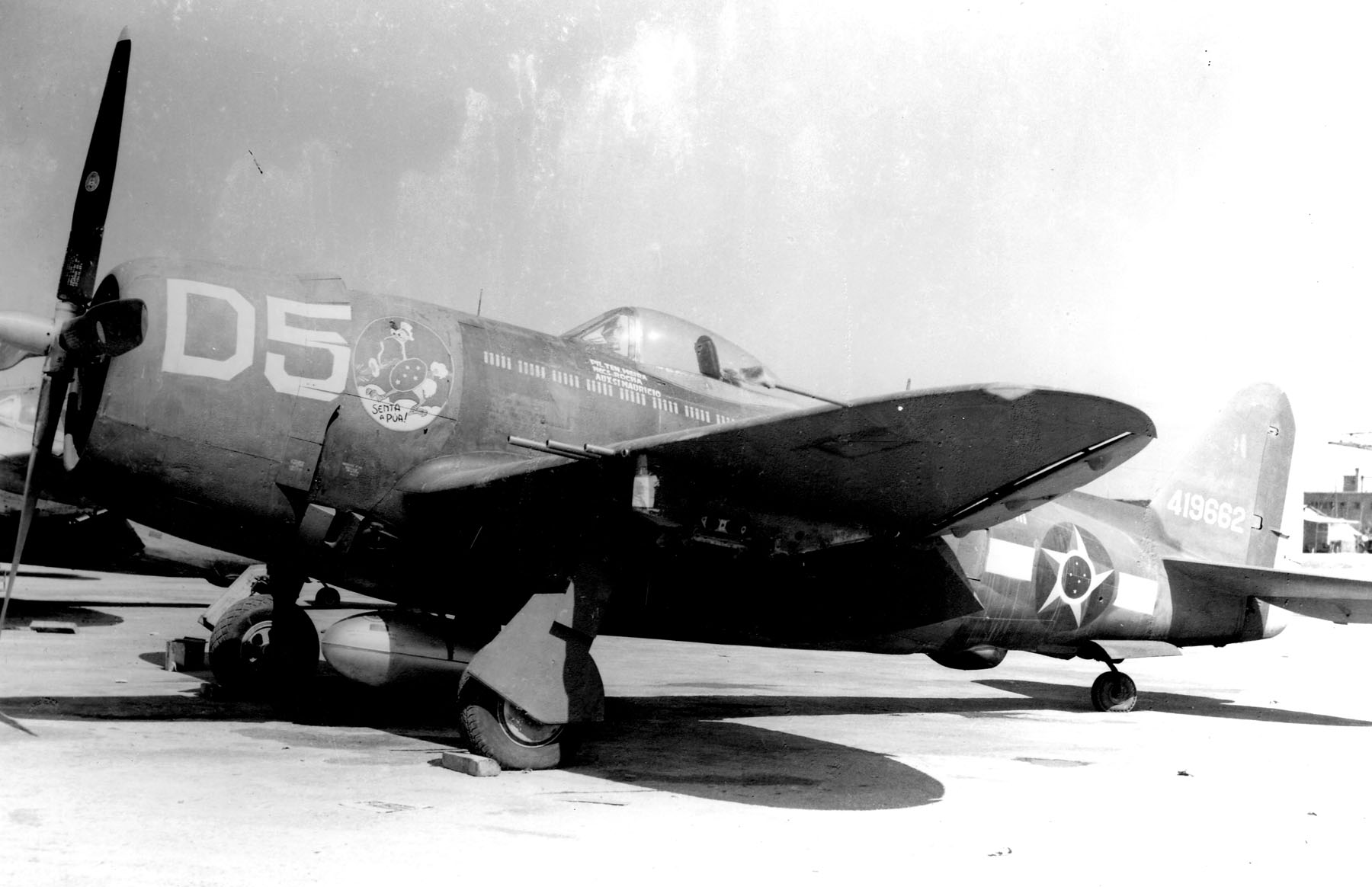
The P-47 fighter-bomber was an American-made aircraft used by several Allied Air Forces during World War II.

In January 1944, members of the 1st Fighter Aviation Group went to Orlando, Florida in the United States, did a 60-hour training period using the Curtiss P-40 Warhawk fighters and adapted to the United States Army Air Forces (USAAF) standards at the School of Tactics Aerial. In March of the same year after training began, the group went to Aguadulce in Panama, where Commander Nero Moura was promoted to the rank of lieutenant colonel; in April of that year, the group had already improved to such an extent that the unit started to operate independently and took part in the Panama Canal Zone Air Defense System complex.

After extensive training, about 110 hours of flight on Curtiss P-40 fighters and dedicated programs for jobs in Panama, the group returned to the United States in June, at Suffolk County Army Air Field in New York, where they were introduced to the Republic P-47 Thunderbolt, the newest fighter of the USAAF so far, there the group performed training as hard as Aguadulce's but soon after the course the pilots and support were ready for action.

The pilots of the group went by ship to Italy and landed at the Port of Livorno, on October 6, 1944, and were about to pass the final test, the so-called blood baptism; the planes used by the FAB in the war were taken from the USAAF warehouse.

=== Campaign in Italy ===
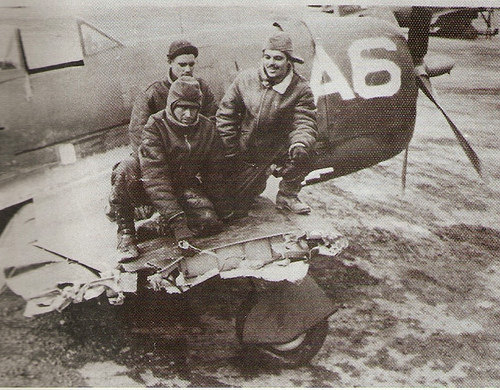
Brazilian Air Force fighter damaged by German forces.

In the Italian Campaign, the 1st Fighter Aviation Group acted in conjunction with the 1st Liaison and Observation Squadron, a group that belongs to the Division of Artillery and that had the objective of carrying out works to regulate the artillery fire, to observe the field of fire. battle and liaison missions and that was integrated into the FEB.

During the war the Jambock group received this identification name in the city of Tarquinia, it was divided between four squads that were identified by a letter and a number, the groups were the red squad (identified by the letter A), the yellow squad (identified by the letter B), the blue squadron (identified by the letter C) and the green squadron (identified by the letter D); in February 1945 the yellow squadron ceased to exist because of the low number of pilots belonging to the group, since of the eleven pilots in the squadron, six were killed or injured, the remaining members joined the other squadrons.

After the missions in the Mediterranean Theater, the Nazi forces retreated to a region known as the Gothic Line, there it was determined by the Allied forces that there was an offensive against the enemies called the Spring Offensive. There was a meeting with the leaders of each squad organized by the American Commander Nielsen, leader of the 350th Fighter Group of the 62nd Fighter Wing of the Twelfth Air Force of the USAAF, of which the 1st GAvCa was subordinate, where it was said that between the 6 and the 29 of April the squadrons should carry out a maximum daily effort of 44 sorties against the enemy forces, where several offensive attacks against the Axis were carried out.

Throughout the Italian campaign, the pilots of the 1st GAvCa made several attacks against refineries, stockpiles, railway bridges, railways, buildings that served as bases for enemies, plants and warehouses, in addition to attacks against accommodations, vehicles offered and participating together with the Brazilian Expeditionary Force in battles such as the Battle of Monte Castello and, among other battles, always with the objective of paving the way so that the allied troops could advance towards the imminent victory that was to be had in the Italian campaign.

Many pilots were shot down in the midst of attacks against German forces, and many of the pilots who were captured were imprisoned in the Nuremberg Concentration Camp in Germany and were later rescued by Allied troops; with each step taken by the allies towards victory over the Germans and Italians, the prisoners were evacuated from the camps and taken to more distant ones, such as Stalag VII-A at Moosburg an der Isar, the prisoners of that camp were not rescued until the end of the war, when the soldiers led by General George S. Patton arrived in the city and rescued the prisoners, including Brazilian pilots and soldiers.

The 1st GAvCa had sixteen planes shot down, losing five of its airmen in combat and another three in accidents; between November 1944 and April 1945 the group completed only 5% of its planned route, but did not complete it due to the end of the war, even so the group was responsible for the destruction of 85% of ammunition deposits, 36% of the deposits of fuel, and 15% of enemy motor vehicles in its entire 7-month campaign, exceeding the expectations of both its allies and its enemies, because of its performance it received the honorable quote from the United States Congress.

=== Danilo's opera ===
Something that marked the participation of the 1st GAvCa in the war was the story of Lieutenant Danilo Moura, Commander Nero Moura's younger brother. On February 4, 1945, after his aircraft was shot down by Nazi anti-aircraft artillery in Italy, he parachuted from his aircraft and survived. He was aided by a group of Italian partisans who took care of him, and, after recovering, the Lieutenant made a journey of 386 km (240 mi), walking 24 days, and losing 19 kg (42 lb), to return to his base. In this way he had to go unnoticed by the Nazi bases, counting on the help of the Italian population, he managed to get to the allied base in Pisa, where he recovered, and then returned home. His survival story gave rise to the Danilo Opera, an event that is staged and honored every year on Fighter Aviation Day, on April 22, the date on which the 1st GAvCa reached the peak of its performances, having performed 44 sorties, distributed in 11 missions.

==== Similar cases ====
Captain Joel Miranda was also shot down on the February 4, mission at Castelfranco Veneto, in an attempt to attack a railway bridge, on the same mission as Danilo. In addition two other American pilots were shot down, but his whereabouts are unknown. Miranda was hit and his plane started to catch fire, which forced him to jump with a parachute, but when he went to jump his phone got stuck in it and fell next to his plane. After loosing himself a few meters from the ground, the captain opened the parachute, but it hit the ground, and broke his arm. He got up for help and fleeing the German troops who were looking for the pilots, he found a boy who took him home. The boy's father took him to a South African soldier in the 8th British Army named Steve Grove. The soldier and Captain Joel Miranda became friends and Steve took Joel undercover to an Italian doctor at a Camposampiero hospital, which was controlled by the Germans. Captain Joel joined a group of Italian partisans, which Grove was part of, where they participated in guerilla action against German forces for a few days, until Grove was captured and killed by an SS officer. After several events of resistance he was taken by the partisans, after the end of the war, back to the base where the Captain went to the English Secret Service to sign a document saying that he would not disclose the names or dates of all the people who helped him.

=== The end of the war ===
On April 28, 1945, the Italian resistance captured and executed the fascist leader Benito Mussolini and other members of the Italian government. The following day Italy's surrender was signed and on the same day the Brazilian armed forces captured an entire German regiment, the 148th Infantry Division at the Battle of Collecchio. On April 30, German leader, Adolf Hitler committed suicide and on May 2, Nazi Germany surrendered to Allied forces, bringing an end to World War II in Europe. Many pilots remember that day, as they were on an attack mission and shortly before attacking they were warned on the radio that the war was over and that it was no longer necessary to attack. Lieutenant Alberto Martins Torres recalls:

We were on a mission, until we received radar control solemnly transmitted ... "Attention, all units ... attention, all units ... don't attack, don't attack. The war is over. Fly back to your bases, immediately." At that moment I felt a shiver and started thinking about my parents, the parents of (pilots) who had died ... in short, it was an indescribable emotional cluster, and as I always say, this was the mission that moved me the most, it was my last mission, and I did not attack, the war was over and we would no longer lose any companions.

— Lieutenant Alberto Torres in the 1999 documentary Senta a Pua!

=== Return to Brazil ===
Arrival of aviators of the Brazilian Air Force, 1945.

After the surrender of Italy and Germany in the war, the group had already fulfilled its role and had no more reason to continue fighting, so in June 1945, all 26 P-47Ds that were used by the 1st Fighter Aviation Group were taken to what is now Naples International Airport at Capodichino. They were dismantled and sent to Naples, where they would be loaded on the ship SS W. S. Jennings that would take them to Brazil. All aviators and members of the Brazilian Expeditionary Force were transported back to Brazil on the American ship USS General M. C. Meigs.

For the crossing between Brazil and the United States the pilots who were killed in combat and those who were rescued from the enemy prisoners camp were sent first. They were sent in descending order from the pilots with the greatest number of missions. A group of 19 officers left Pisa for New York to receive the new aircraft for the FAB. From New York the officers traveled to the American capital Washington, D. C. by train and there they were met by the United States Army Air Forces at the Shoreham Hotel and later by generals Ira C. Eaker and Hoyt Vandenberg at the Pentagon.

On July 16, 1945, the first pilots of the 1st Fighter Aviation Group landed in Campo dos Afonsos arriving from the war, with them accompanied by the new FAB Thunderbolt that were escorted by a Douglas C-47. In the latter came Second Lieutenant Marcos Eduardo Coelho de Magalhães and First Lieutenant Roberto Brandini, who were recovering from war injuries. The ship USS General M. C. Meigs, which carried the rest of the FAB pilots and the FEB soldiers, arrived in Rio de Janeiro on July 18, 1945.

The heroes of the FAB were received by President Getúlio Vargas, who, together with the high command of the FAB, decorated the national heroes for their achievements in the Second World War.

The pilots who brought the new fighters joined the rest of the group and with the FEB and 1st ELO troops for a popular parade that had the destination of Praça Mauá, this event became known as the "Parada da Vitória". The members of the 1st Fighter Aviation Group were in open vehicles and directly behind them the FEB infantry troops, celebrating the Brazilian victory and the return of the heroes of the Second World War.

=== Postwar recognition ===
In 1986 the achievements of the 1st Fighter Aviation Group in the Italian Campaign were recognized once again, the 1st GAvCa became the third unit that does not belong to the United States Armed Forces to receive the Presidential Unit Citation, on request the United States government due to the important advances of the Brazilian hunting group in the campaign in Italy. In addition to the Brazilian unit, only two other foreign units received such an honor, both from the Royal Australian Air Force.

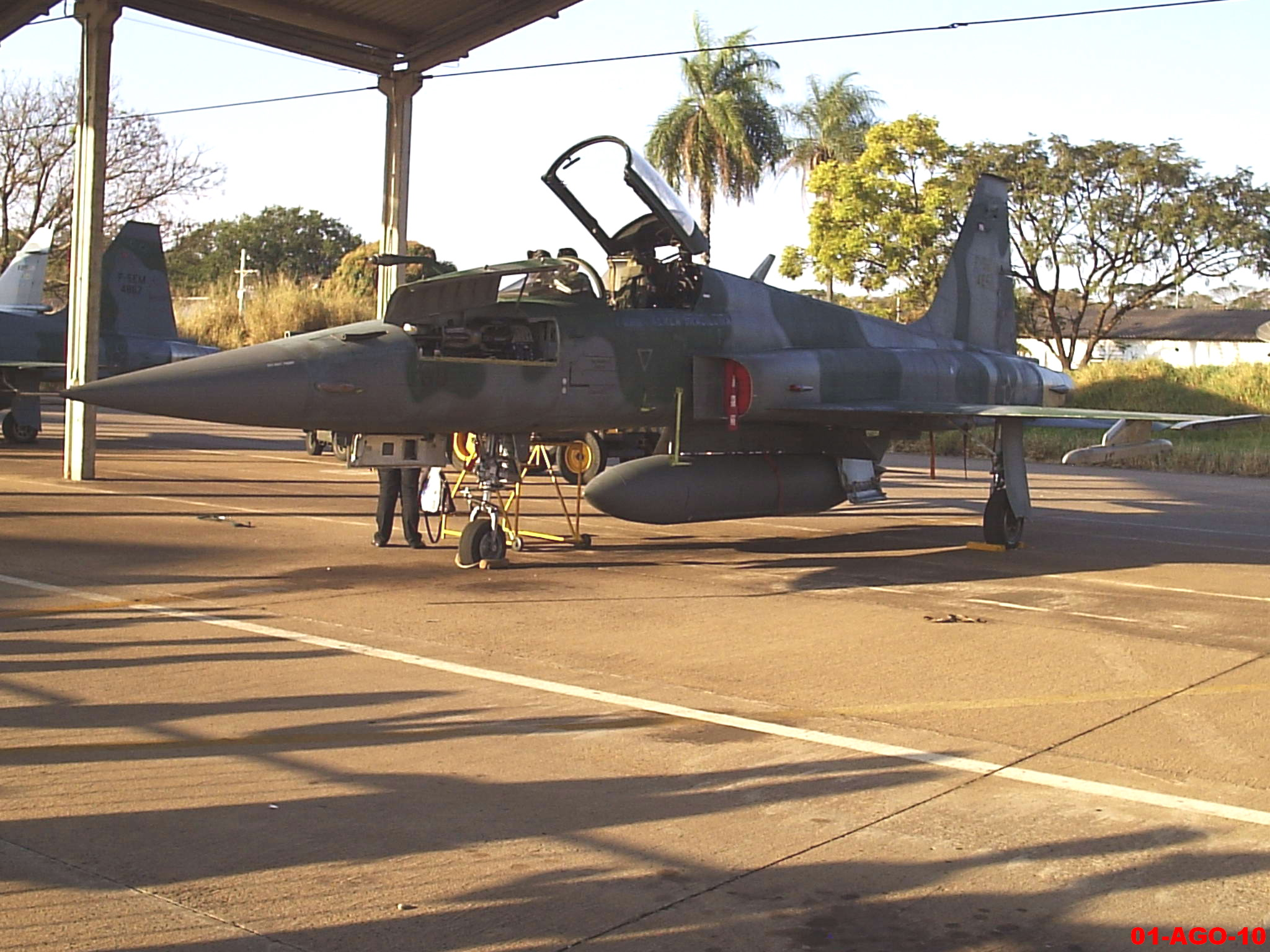
F-5M of the 1st Fighter Aviation Group at Santa Cruz Air Base.

=== Over the years ===
Since then the base of the 1st Fighter Aviation Group is the Santa Cruz Air Force Base, located in Rio de Janeiro in an old Zeppelin hangar, the group is composed of two squadrons, the Jambock of the 1st Squadron of the 1st Aviation Group of Caça follow the motto Senta a Púa! And the Pif-paf of the 2nd Squadron of the 1st Aviation Group of Caça follow the motto Rompe Mato!; in addition, the base houses other units, the 1st and 2nd squadron of the 1st and 16th Aviation Group, the 4th and 7th Aviation Group and the 2nd Connection and Observation Squadron.

In 1953, the 1st GAvC began operating Gloster F-8 Meteor fighter jets that were used until 1968, when they were replaced by the Lockheed TF-33A T-Bird, which were operated until 1972, when they started using the national aircraft Embraer AT-26 Xavante. In 1975 the unit also used the Northrop F-5B Freedom Fighter and F-5E Tiger II fighters. At that time there was a change in camouflage to the current standard, where the insignia of the 1st squadron (Jambock) and the 2nd Squadron (Pif-paf) were added on the right side of the vertical stabilizer, with the insignia of the 1st GAvC being used on the left side of all aircraft. Its aircraft, the Tiger II, were modernized through a revitalization program developed by Embraer for the FAB, which greatly extended the useful life of these aircraft. The Northrop / Embraer F-5EM and F-5FM Tiger II are the current aircraft used by the 1st Fighter Aviation Group.

As of 2021, the 1st GAvC starts operating the F-39 Gripen aircraft, starting after the second half of the year.

== Statistical summary during World War II ==
Total operations
Total missions performed	445
Total offensive exits	2,546
Total defensive exits	4
Total flight hours in war operations	5,465
Total flight hours performed	6,144
Total bombs dropped	4,442
Incendiary bombs (FTI)	166
Cluster bombs (260 lb (120 kg))	16
Cluster bombs (90 lb (41 kg))	72
Demolition bombs (1,000 lb (450 kg))	8
Demolition bombs (500 lb (230 kg))	4,180
Approximate total tonnage of bombs	1 010
Total 50 caliber ammunition	1,180,200
Total rockets launched	850
Total liters of gasoline consumed	4,058,651 L (892,778 imp gal; 1,072,182 US gal)

Total operations
	Destroyed	Damaged
Airplanes	2	9
Locomotives	13	92
Motorized transport	1,304	686
Wagons and tank cars	250	835
Armored cars	8	13
Animal-drawn vehicles	79	19
Railroad and carriageway bridges	25	51
Bridges on railroads and highways	412	–
Sorting platforms	3	–
Buildings occupied by the enemy	144	94
Camps	1	4
Command posts	2	2
Artillery positions	85	15
Accommodation	3	8
Factories	6	5
Miscellaneous facilities	125	54
Power plants	5	4
Fuel and ammunition tanks	31	15
Material deposits	11	1
Refineries	3	2
Radar stations	–	2
Vessels	19	52
Ships	–	1

== History behind the emblem ==
Senta a Púa! is the symbol and war cry of the 1st Fighter Aviation Group (1º GAvCa) of the Brazilian Air Force, it is similar to the British "Tally-ho" or the French "À la chasse". Before military use, the cry "Senta a púa" was a colloquial expression.

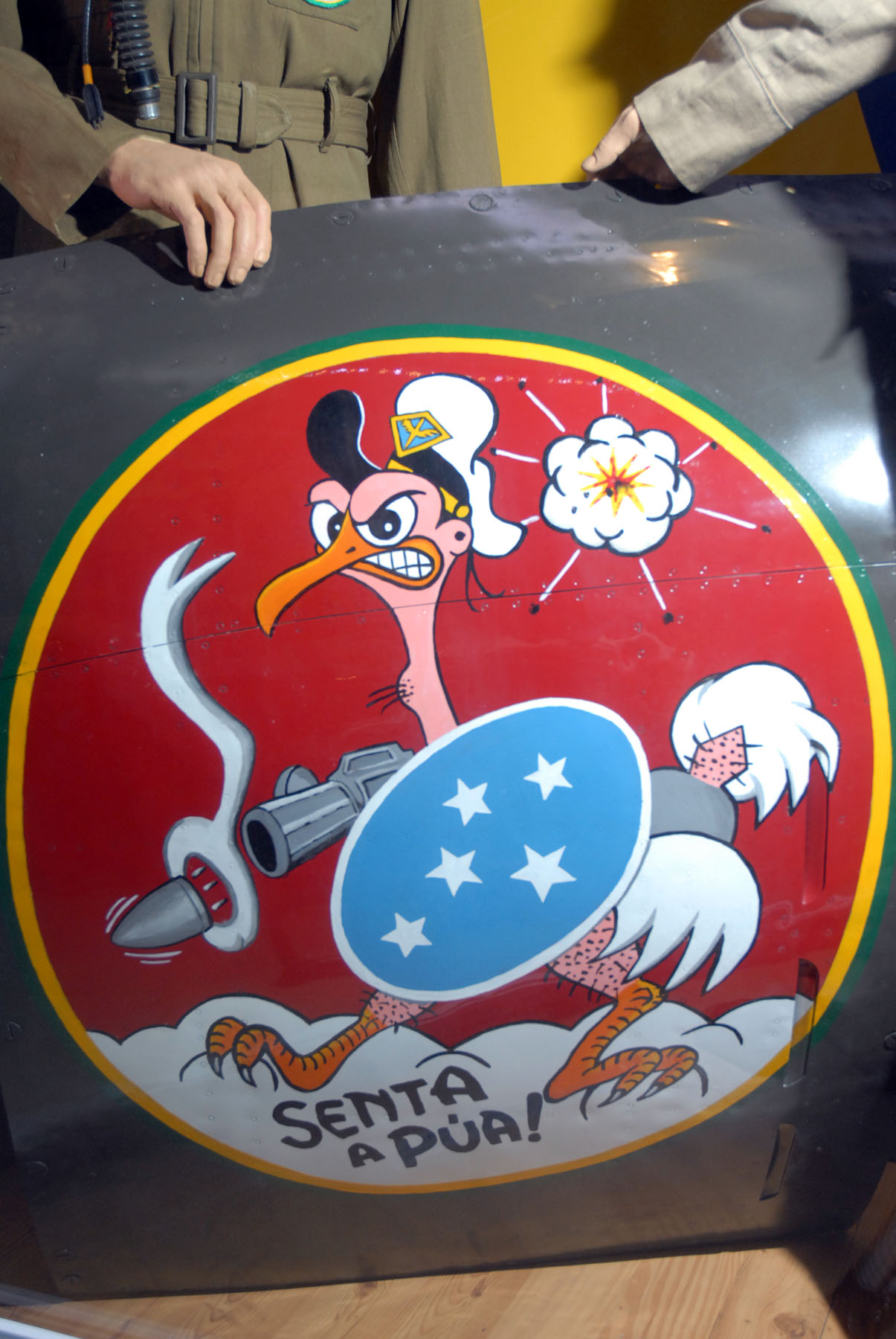
The Senta a Púa symbol! exhibited at the National Museum of the United States Air Force.

The 1st Ten. Av. Firmino Ayres de Araújo, from the Salvador Air Force Base, already used the expression to rush someone. Coming from the same base, Ten. Av. Rui Barbosa Moreira Lima introduced the expression in the daily life of the 1st GAvCa. It was only after the training, towards the European Theater that Cap. Av. Fortunato Câmara de Oliveira drew the symbol (whose face of the ostrich refers to the features of the 2nd Lieutenant Aviator Pedro de Lima Mendes). Hence, the group gave itself identity and the expression started to gain strength, as in the words of Austragésilo de Athayde: "Senta a Púa: to launch yourself against the enemy with decision, sight and desire to annihilate him. Who will senta a púa does not quibble. Throw a red-hot iron and gum the brute ".

In combat, the expression was used to confirm an order of attack, given the distinction of the words: A pilot reports to the leader "I saw a target" - to which the expected answer would be: "Senta a púa!".

== Symbolism of the emblem ==
- Yellow-green outer stripe - Brazil
- Ostrich - speed and maneuverability of the fighter and the stomach of the pilots, who could take any food (reference to American foreign food).
- Ostrich cap - pilot of the Brazilian Air Force
- Shield - the robustness of the P-47 Thunderbolt plane and pilot protection
- Blue background and stars - the sky of Brazil with Cruzeiro do Sul
- Revolver - firepower of the P-47 Thunderbolt plane
- Cloud - airspace, or the "airman's floor"
- Red background - war sky, hostile
- Shards of a Flak - the increasingly severe enemy anti-aircraft artillery (added later).

== Notable members ==
- Nero Moura - Commander and founder of the 1st Fighter Aviation Group and patron of fighter aviation in Brazil.
- Nélson Freire Lavanère-Wanderley - Lieutenant Colonel of the 1st Fighter Aviation Group and patron of the National Air Mail.
- José Vicente Faria Lima - Founding member of the 1st Fighter Aviation Group.
- Joaquim Pedro Salgado Filho - Prime Minister of Aeronautics, first Commander of the Brazilian Air Force and founding member of the 1st Fighter Aviation Group.
- Danilo Marques Moura - Second Lieutenant whose history as a survivor in the Second War gave rise to the opera of Danilo, celebrated every year on Fighter Aviation Day.
- Alberto Martins Torres - Second Lieutenant responsible for incredible achievements in the Battle of the South Atlantic and founder of Transportes Aéreos Bandeirantes.
- Rui Moreira Lima - Second Lieutenant responsible for creating the motto used by the 1st GAvCa, Senta a Púa!.
- Fortunato Câmara de Oliveira - Captain responsible for creating the emblem used by the 1st GAvCa.
- Roberto Pessoa Ramos - Colonel and hero of the Second War, he was killed in an air accident in Vitória, Espírito Santo in 1967, preventing further damage from the accident.
- Joel Miranda - Captain and leader of the yellow squadron, he was a survivor after being shot down on a mission and fighter alongside the partisans while he was presumed missing.
- José Rebelo Meira de Vasconcelos - Major Brigadeiro do Ar and hero of the Second World War in the Italian Campaign.
- José Carlos de Miranda Corrêa - Major Brigadeiro do Ar and last surviving Second World War veteran of the group.
- Raymundo da Costa Canário - a Lieutenant of the 1st GAvCa who was able to successfully return to base and land after the right wing of his P-47 Thunderbolt was completely sheared off against a building's chimney on a strafing run against German tanks, January 27, 1945.

== See also ==
- Military history of Brazil
