= Aeroclube de Sergipe =

Sergipe Flying club Aeroclube de Sergipe
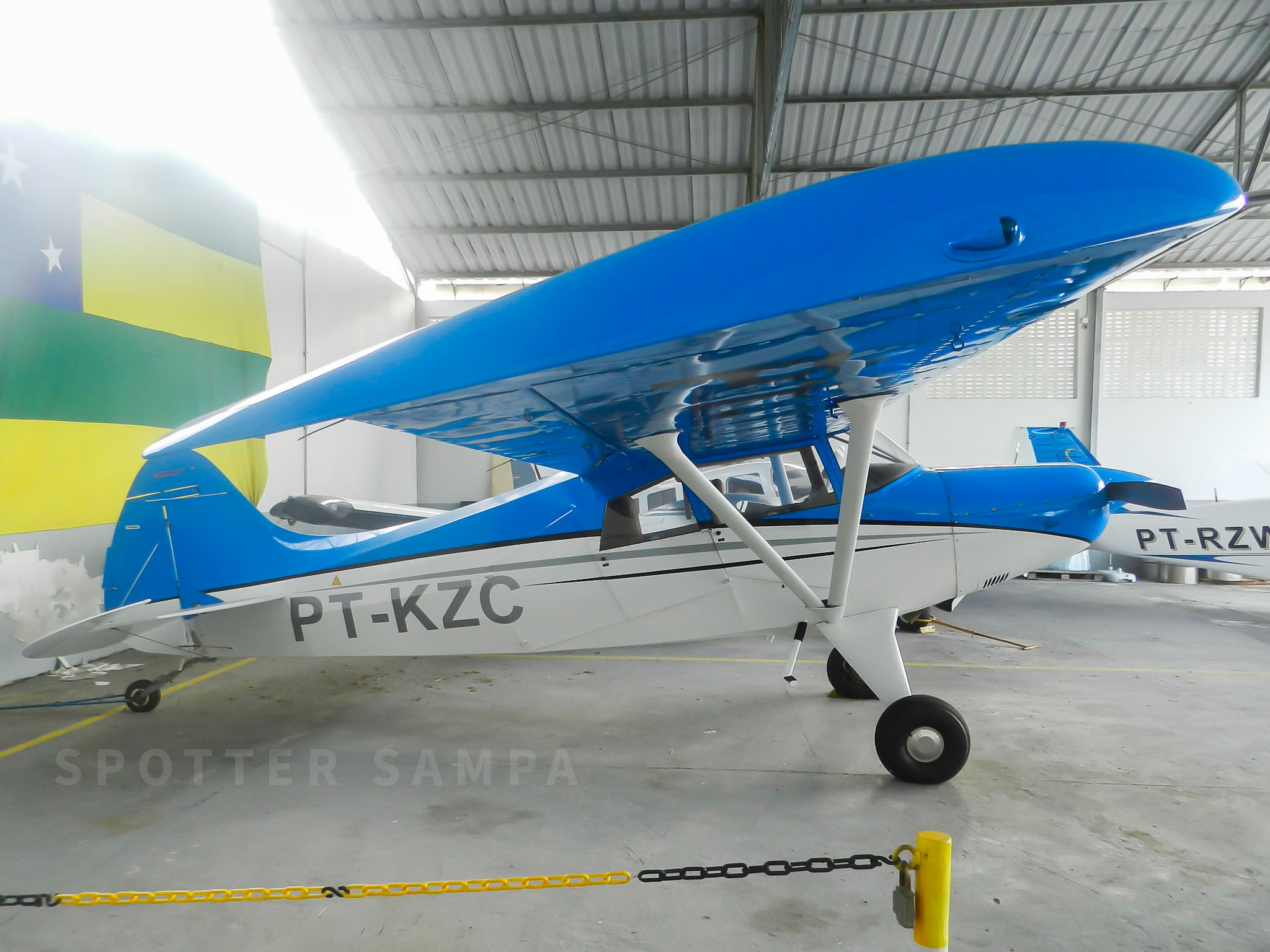
- IATA: none; ICAO: SISG

Summary
- Airport type: Private/Military
- Serves: Aracaju, Sergipe, Brazil
- Opened: 24 February 1939; 87 years ago
- Hub for: Panair do Brasil; VASP; Transbrasil; Real Transportes Aéreos; Varig
- Time zone: Time in Brazil (UTC−03:00)
- Elevation AMSL: 8 m / 26 ft
- Coordinates: 10°54′05″S 037°04′59″W

Map
- Location in Brazil

Runways
| Direction | Length | | Surface |
| Direction | m | ft | Surface |
|---|---|---|---|
| 14/32 | 500 | 1,640 | Asphalt |
- Sources: ANAC

Aeroclube de Sergipe (ICAO: SISG) is a private aerodrome located in Aracaju, Brazil.

== History ==
Although the Aeroclub was founded in 1939, aviation in Aracaju began earlier, with events that paved the way. With its runway and hangar infrastructure, the ACS became, in practice, the first airport in Sergipe. This airfield quickly gained activity, receiving aircraft from several important airlines of the time, such as PANAIR, VARIG, VASP, Real, among others. The Aeroclub's main function, in addition to receiving commercial flights, was the training of new pilots. This was a fundamental step in creating an aeronautical culture and forming the cadre of aviators that would soon become crucial.

=== National prominence due to (World War II and Heroism (1942)) ===
The Sergipe Aeroclub gained national and historical prominence with Brazil's entry into the war. Between 15 and 16 August 1942, the coast of Sergipe and Bahia was the scene of the deadliest attack by German submarines (U-507) in Brazil. Three Brazilian merchant ships — the Baependi, the Araraquara, and the Aníbal Benévolo — were torpedoed near the mouth of the Rio Real, on the border between Sergipe and Bahia, resulting in hundreds of deaths. This unprecedented tragedy generated intense popular outrage and was the trigger that led Brazil to declare war against the Axis powers (Germany and Italy) days later. Aboard the ACS aircraft, they conducted patrol and search flights along the coast, locating wreckage and, most importantly, shipwrecked survivors struggling at sea. By finding and helping to rescue the survivors, the Aeroclub pilots confirmed, in an undeniable and public manner, the German aggression in Brazilian waters. For Sergipe, the war was not fought on battlefields in Europe, but rather on the coast, through the so-called Submarine Warfare (Battle of the South Atlantic). The arrival of the shipwrecked and, especially, the bodies on the beaches of Sergipe and Bahia (such as on the Rodovia dos Náufragos and in Mosqueiro, Aracaju) deeply shocked the population. The popular commotion generated intense protests throughout the country against the Axis powers (Germany, Italy, and Japan). The aggression in Sergipe waters was the direct motivating factor for President Getúlio Vargas to declare war on Germany and Italy, which officially occurred on 22 August 1942.The Sergipe Aeroclub played a heroic and fundamental role. Immediately after the attacks, the Aeroclub's pilots, aboard small planes such as Piper Cubs, were the first to conduct patrol and search flights. They located shipwrecked people and were crucial in rescuing survivors, confirming German aggression in Brazilian territorial waters. The city of Aracaju was forced to adopt strict nighttime blackouts. The city and house lights were turned off to prevent the glare from serving as a reference point for German submarines patrolling the coast at night. Sergipe, due to its strategic position on the coast and for being the scene of the tragedy that triggered Brazil's entry into the war, became a focal point of the conflict in the South Atlantic, where the Aeroclub stood out as one of the first defenders of Brazilian sovereignty.

== Airlines and destinations ==
No scheduled flights operate at this airport.

- The airline listed below has been suspended and transferred to Aracaju International Airport.
1. Panair do Brasil
2. VASP
3. Transbrasil
4. Real Transportes Aéreos
5. Varig

== Access ==
The airport is located 4 km (2 mi) from downtown Aracaju.

== See also ==
- List of airports in Brazil
- Aracaju-Santa Maria
