= Santa Maria Airport (Sergipe) =

Brazilian airport

Aracaju–Santa Maria International Airport Aeroporto Internacional de Aracaju–Santa Maria

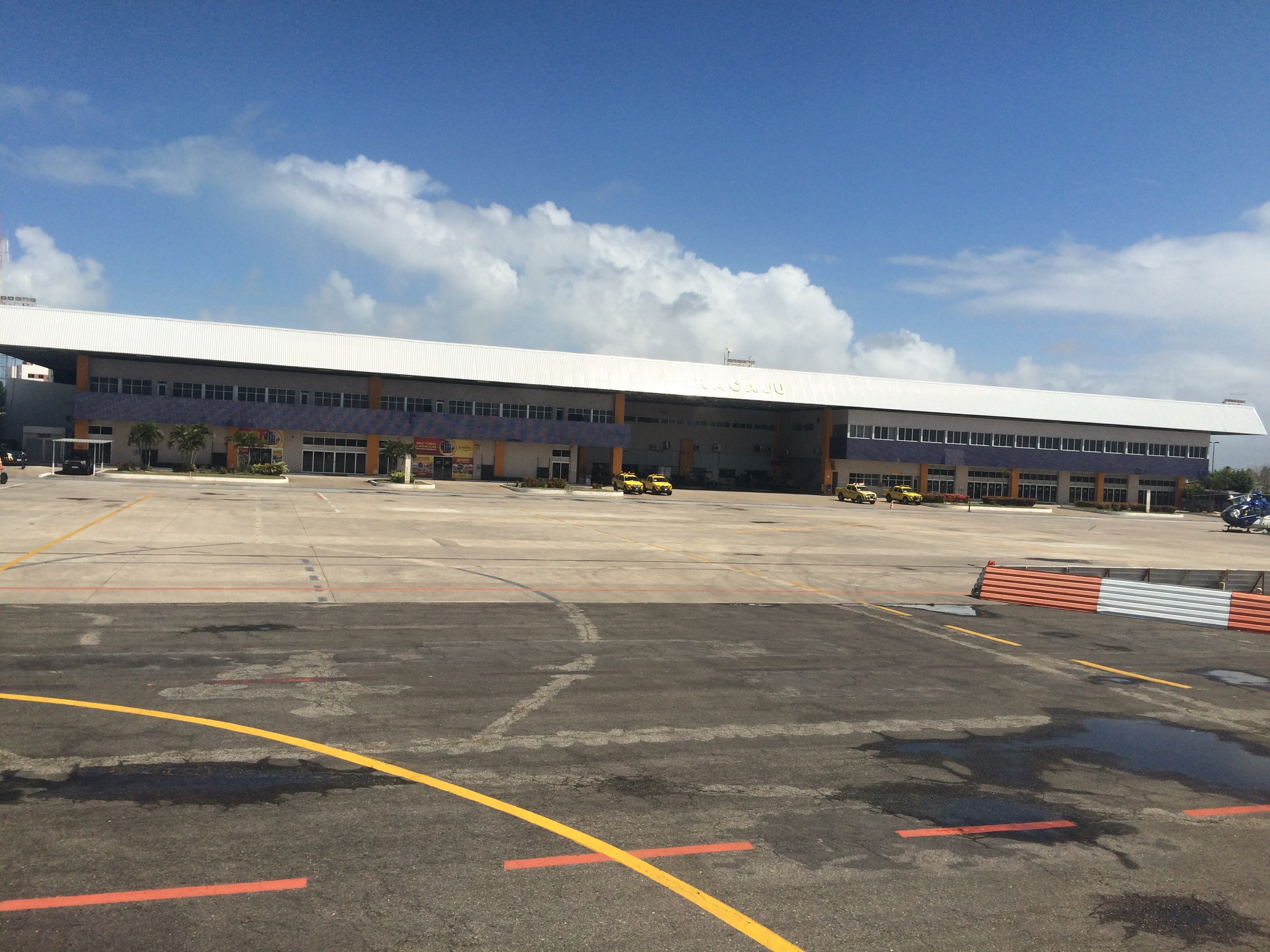
- IATA: AJU; ICAO: SBAR; LID: SE0001

Summary
- Airport type: Public
- Operator: Infraero (1975–2019); AENA (2019–present)
- Serves: Aracaju
- Opened: 19 January 1958; 68 years ago
- Time zone: BRT (UTC−03:00)
- Elevation AMSL: 7 m (23 ft)
- Coordinates: 10°59′07″S 037°04′24″W
- Website: www.aenabrasil.com.br/pt/aeroportos/aeroporto-internacional-santa-maria-aracaju/index.html

Map
- Location in Brazil

Runways
Direction	Length		Surface
Direction	m	ft	Surface
12/30	2,200	7,218	Asphalt

Statistics (2025)
- Passengers: 1,377,686 ▲7%
- Aircraft Operations: 15,823 ▲9%
- Metric tonnes of cargo: 2,548 ▲14%
- Statistics: AENA; Sources: Airport Website, ANAC, DECEA

Aracaju–Santa Maria International Airport (IATA: AJU, ICAO: SBAR) is the airport serving Aracaju, Brazil.

It is operated by AENA.

== History ==
Although it had been in operation since the beginning of the 1950s, the official opening of the airport took place on 19 January 1958.

In 1961, the first renovation of the airport complex began, with an extension of the runway and enlargement of the passenger terminal.

In 1975, Infraero became the administrator of the airport. Infraero later invested in further extension of the runway (completed in 1993) and in significant enlargement of the passenger terminal (completed in 1998).

In 2012, the airport started the last extension through the construction of a completely new passenger terminal which will double its capacity.

Previously operated by Infraero, on March 15, 2019, AENA won a 30-year concession to operate the airport.

== Airlines and destinations ==
Airlines	Destinations
Azul Brazilian Airlines	Belo Horizonte–Confins, Campinas, Recife, Salvador da Bahia; Seasonal: São Paulo–Congonhas
Gol Linhas Aéreas	Brasília, Rio de Janeiro–Galeão, Salvador da Bahia (ends 30 January 2027), São Paulo–Congonhas, São Paulo–Guarulhos
LATAM Brasil	Brasília, São Paulo–Guarulhos; Seasonal: São Paulo–Congonhas

== Statistics ==
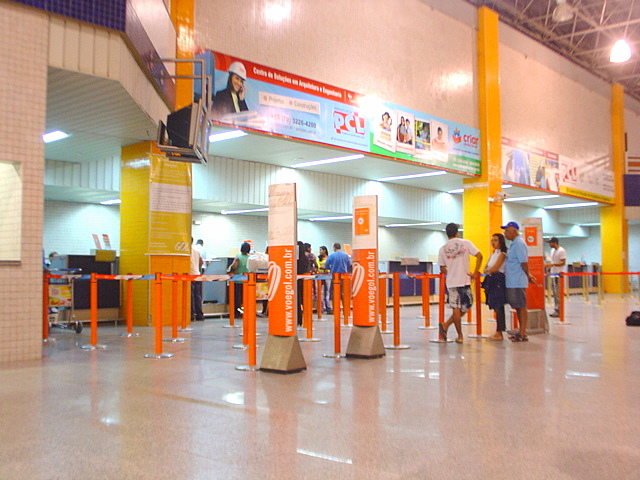
Check-in Hall

Following are the number of passenger, aircraft and cargo movements at the airport, according to Infraero (2007-2019) and AENA (2020-2025) reports:

Year	Passenger	Aircraft	Cargo (t)
2025	1,377,686 ▲7%	15,823 ▲9%	2,548 ▲14%
2024	1,286,300 ▲9%	14,579 ▲22%	2,234 ▲28%
2023	1,175,823 ▲22%	11,956 ▲5%	1,739 ▼13%
2022	961,575 ▲20%	11,421 ▲10%	2,002 ▲17%
2021	801,924 ▲29%	10,349 ▲16%	1,714 ▲51%
2020	620,601 ▼46%	8,946 ▼36%	1,135 ▼57%
2019	1,142,357 ▼4%	13,901 ▲15%	2,654 ▼1%
2018	1,191,893 ▼3%	12,115 ▼6%	2,688 ▲13%
2017	1,225,789	12,847 ▼3%	2,373 ▲20%
2016	1,225,591 ▼4%	13,279 ▼18%	1,983 ▼18%
2015	1,280,236 ▼7%	16,249 ▼24%	2,417 ▲9%
2014	1,377,535 ▲3%	21,306 ▼7%	2,213 ▲14%
2013	1,343,899 ▼2%	22,845 ▼12%	1,934 ▲10%
2012	1,373,401 ▲26%	26,033 ▲26%	1,752 ▼7%
2011	1,093,143 ▲16%	20,701 ▲10%	1,879 ▼14%
2010	940,389 ▲29%	18,850 ▲26%	2,183 ▼13%
2009	727,679 ▲9%	14,915 ▼15%	2,504 ▼5%
2008	669,777 ▼3%	17,631 ▼7%	2,646 ▲10%
2007	691,640	18,968	2,413

== Accidents and incidents ==
- 12 July 1951: a Lóide Aéreo Nacional Douglas DC-3/C-47 registration PP-LPG, still registered under Linhas Aéreas Paulistas – LAP, flying from Maceió to Aracaju, after aborting a landing in adverse conditions in Aracaju, overflew the runway and initiated a turn in low altitude to the right. The aircraft crashed during this turn. All 33 passengers and crew died including the Governor of the state of Rio Grande do Norte, Jerônimo Dix-sept Rosado Maia.

== Access ==
The airport is located 12 kilometres (7.5 mi) from downtown Aracaju.

== See also ==
- List of airports in Brazil
- Aracaju-Aeroclube de Sergipe
