= Fortaleza Air Force Base =

Air base of the Brazilian Air Force

- Base Aérea de Fortaleza
- Fortaleza, Ceará in Brazil

Site information
- Type: Air Force Base
- Code: BAFZ
- Owner: Brazilian Air Force
- Controlled by: Brazilian Air Force
- Open to the public: No
- Website: www.fab.mil.br/organizacoes/mostra/41/BASE%20A%C3%89REA%20DE%20FORTALEZA

Location
- Location in Brazil
- Coordinates: 03°46′33″S 038°31′56″W

Site history
- Built: 1933
- In use: 1941-present

Garrison information
- Current commander: Cel. Av. Francisco Cláudio Gomes Sampaio

Airfield information
- Identifiers: IATA: FOR, ICAO: SBFZ, LID: CE0001
- Elevation: 25 metres (82 ft) AMSL
Runways
| Direction | Length and surface |
|---|---|
| 13/31 | 2,755 metres (9,039 ft) Asphalt |

Base Aérea de Fortaleza – BAFZ (IATA: FOR, ICAO: SBFZ) is a base of the Brazilian Air Force, located 6 km from downtown Fortaleza, Brazil. It shared some terrain with Pinto Martins International Airport, which were sold to became Warehouses.

== History ==
Belém Air Force Base has its origins on the 6th Aviation Regiment created on 15 May 1933. The Air Force Base was created on 22 May 1941 by Decree 3,302.

== Units ==
Since January 2017 there are no permanent flying units assigned to Fortaleza Air Force Base. The aerodrome was used as a support facility to other air units of the Brazilian Air Force, Navy and Army. There is none active aircraft too, there is only buildings and an aircraft monument at entrance. A school was made inside it.

Former Units
December 2001–October 2013: 1st Squadron of the 5th Aviation Group (1º/5ºGAv) Rumba. The squadron was moved to Natal Air Force Base.

== See also ==
- List of Brazilian military bases
- Pinto Martins International Airport
