= Transportes Aéreos Bandeirantes =

Brazilian airline, 1945–1950

Transportes Aéreos Bandeirantes (TABA)
- Founded: 1945
- Ceased operations: 1950
- Key people: Alberto Martins Torres

Transportes Aéreos Bandeirantes (TABA) was a Brazilian airline founded in 1945. In 1950 it was incorporated by Lóide Aéreo Nacional.

== History ==
TABA (from Transportes Aéreos Bandeirantes) was founded in 1945 by Alberto Martins Torres, a former pilot of the Brazilian Air Force. Originally the airline was called Transportes Aéreos da Bacia Amazônica and revenue was based on the transportation of rubber to Belém. However, even before starting its services, the market for rubber changed, prices dropped and operation on that basis became unviable. For this reason the owner requested that the Brazilian authorities change its authorized routes for the trunk route Rio de Janeiro / Porto Alegre. Since it would not operate in the Amazon Basin anymore, the name was changed to Transportes Aéreos Bandeirantes in order to maintain the acronym.

In 1948 the airline started its services from Rio de Janeiro to Laguna using its Consolidated PBY-5 Catalina aircraft. Later, the route was extended until Porto Alegre.

After being grounded for some months for lack of equipment, TABA was sold to Lóide Aéreo Nacional in 1950.

== Fleet ==
TABA (Bandeirantes) fleet
Aircraft	Total	Years of operation	Notes
Consolidated PBY-5 Catalina	2	1948–1949	
Douglas DC-3	1	1949	

== Accidents and incidents ==
- 30 September 1949: a Consolidated PBY-5 Catalina registration PP-BLB hit an obstacle under the water while landing at Iguape, São Paulo and capsized. A crew member and two passengers died.

== See also ==
- List of defunct airlines of Brazil
