= Manguinhos Airport =

Former airport in Rio de Janeiro, Brazil

Manguinhos Airport Aeroporto de Manguinhos
- IATA: none; ICAO: none

Summary
- Airport type: Defunct
- Serves: Rio de Janeiro
- Coordinates: 22°52′16″S 043°14′30″W

Map
- Approximate location within greater Rio de Janeiro Manguinhos Airport (Brazil)

Runways
| Direction | Length | | Surface |
| Direction | ft | m | Surface |
|---|---|---|---|
| | ~~1,969~~ (closed) | ~~600~~ |
| | ~~1,640~~ (closed) | ~~500~~ |
- Demolished, no longer operational.

Manguinhos Airport was an airport that existed in the neighborhood of Manguinhos, near Oswaldo Cruz Foundation in Rio de Janeiro from 1936 to 1972.

== History ==
Manguinhos Airport in October 1941

The origin of Manguinhos Airport is related to Aeroclube do Brasil (English: Brazil Flying Club), a school of aviation founded in 1911 at Campo dos Afonsos Airport. In 1919, the Brazilian Army decided to locate at this facility the School of Military Aviation and forced the Flying Club to move elsewhere.

The board of directors decided to re-locate its facilities near Oswaldo Cruz Foundation and for that land was flattened and a swamp drained. An official property land-title was however never given to the Flying Club; it just occupied the site with the acknowledgement of authorities. Manguinhos was officially opened in 1936 although it had been in use before this year. In fact, around this time whereas Santos Dumont Airport served mainly hydroplanes, aircraft with landing gear used the Manguinhos facilities. In fact, ETA – Empresa de Transporte Aéreo had its operational base at the airport.

On December 22, 1959, a major accident led to the eventual closure of the airport: a VASP Vickers Viscount 827 and a Brazilian Air Force Fokker S-11 based at Afonsos Air Force Base collided in the air very close to Manguinhos Airport. The VASP aircraft, originating at Brasília, and on approach to land at Rio de Janeiro-Galeão, crashed killing its 32 occupants and 10 persons on the ground. The cadet parachuted to safety. According to the press, the pilot of the Fokker, the Air Force cadet Eduardo da Silva Pereira, with only 19 flight-hours, was trying to impress his girlfriend by doing manoeuvres over her house in the proximity of Manguinhos Airport and collided with the Viscount. Official investigations, however, state that the cadet was training manoeuvres outside the designated training area and did not see the Viscount approaching. Moreover, the aircraft had no radio communication equipment. The cadet left the Air Force one year later because of other reasons.

The accident opened questions about the interference of air traffic related to Manguinhos in approaches to Rio de Janeiro-Galeão and Rio de Janeiro-Santos Dumont airports. Even though no aircraft based in Manguinhos was involved directly in the accident, authorities believed that similar accidents could happen in the future.

In 1961, operations at Manguinhos were severely restricted and Brazil Flying Club had to move elsewhere. Since there was a maintenance company based at Manguinhos, certain flights were still allowed with control operated by Galeão until 1972, when Manguinhos closed. Hangars and the control tower were demolished and presently the shanty town Vila do João, part of Complexo da Maré, is located at the site of the closed airport.

== Accidents and incidents ==
- December 22, 1959: a VASP Vickers Viscount 827 registration PP-SRG while on approach to land at Rio de Janeiro-Galeão was involved in a mid-air collision with the Brazilian Air Force Fokker S-11 (T-21) registration FAB0742 in the vicinity of Manguinhos. All 32 people on board the Viscount were killed, as were a further ten on the ground. The T-21 pilot parachuted to safety. This accident eventually led to the closure of Manguinhos Airport.

== Access ==
The airport was located 12 km (7 mi) north of downtown Rio de Janeiro.
