= Empresa de Transporte Aéreo =

Brazilian airline

Empresa de Transporte Aéreo (ETA)
- Founded: 1928
- Commenced operations: 1929
- Ceased operations: 1929
- Headquarters: Rio de Janeiro, Brazil
- Key people: Ruy Vacani

Empresa de Transporte Aéreo & Companhia Limitada (ETA) was a Brazilian airline founded in 1928. It ceased operations in 1929.

== History ==
Though founded in 1928, the history of the airline can be traced to one year earlier. In 1927, Ralph O'Neill wanted to establish postal services between the United States of America and South America, and worked in two fronts: establishing an American airline to operate the trunk-routes and establishing or purchasing local airlines to provide feeder-services.

It was with this intention that O'Neill contacted Ruy Vacani and Benjamin and Alexandre Braga, who were in the process of creating an airline. The contacts did not reach a definite conclusion because O'Neill did not agree on the financial aspect of the operation and Vacani and the Braga brothers could not provide exclusive exploration of air services in Brazil, as demanded by O'Neill.

Both groups however pursued their plans and while O'Neill established NYRBA, Vacani and the Braga Brothers founded ETA on August 10, 1928. ETA received a concession to fly on the entire territory of Brazil on March 1, 1929 but the Brazilian government did not grant the requested exclusivity of exploration of air services in Brazil. Its plans consisted of flying postal bags from Rio de Janeiro to São Paulo, to Campos dos Goytacazes, and to Belo Horizonte, using aircraft with landing wheels, an uncommon characteristic in Brazil at the time.

The first flight took off on July 30, 1929 from Rio de Janeiro-Manguinhos Airport to São Paulo-Campo de Marte Airport and took 3 hours and 45 minutes.

Seeking to grow its operations, ETA contacted a director of NYRBA who was willing to sell aircraft - but who also wanted to buy the airline. The sale contract was signed on August 13, 1929 and a minor portion of the agreed price paid. However, the contract was not registered and had actual faults which made it invalid according to Brazilian law. Furthermore, ETA did not have the exclusivity demanded by O'Neill. For this reason, O'Neill denounced the contract and declared the transaction null. A years-long legal battle followed.

Losing interest in air operations, Vacani and the Braga brothers ceased the operations of ETA on November 16, 1929 sold two of its aircraft to Varig, the ones registered as P-BBAC and P-BBAD. There is no record of the fate of P-BBAA.

Years later, in 1947, Ruy Vacani started another airline: Lóide Aéreo Nacional.

== Destinations ==
- Rio de Janeiro – Manguinhos Airport
- São Paulo – Campo de Marte Airport

== Fleet ==
ETA fleet
Aircraft	Total	Years of operation	Notes
Klemm KL 25	3	1929-1929

== See also ==
- List of defunct airlines of Brazil
