= Campina Grande Airport =

Airport in Brazil

Presidente João Suassuna Airport Aeroporto Presidente João Suassuna

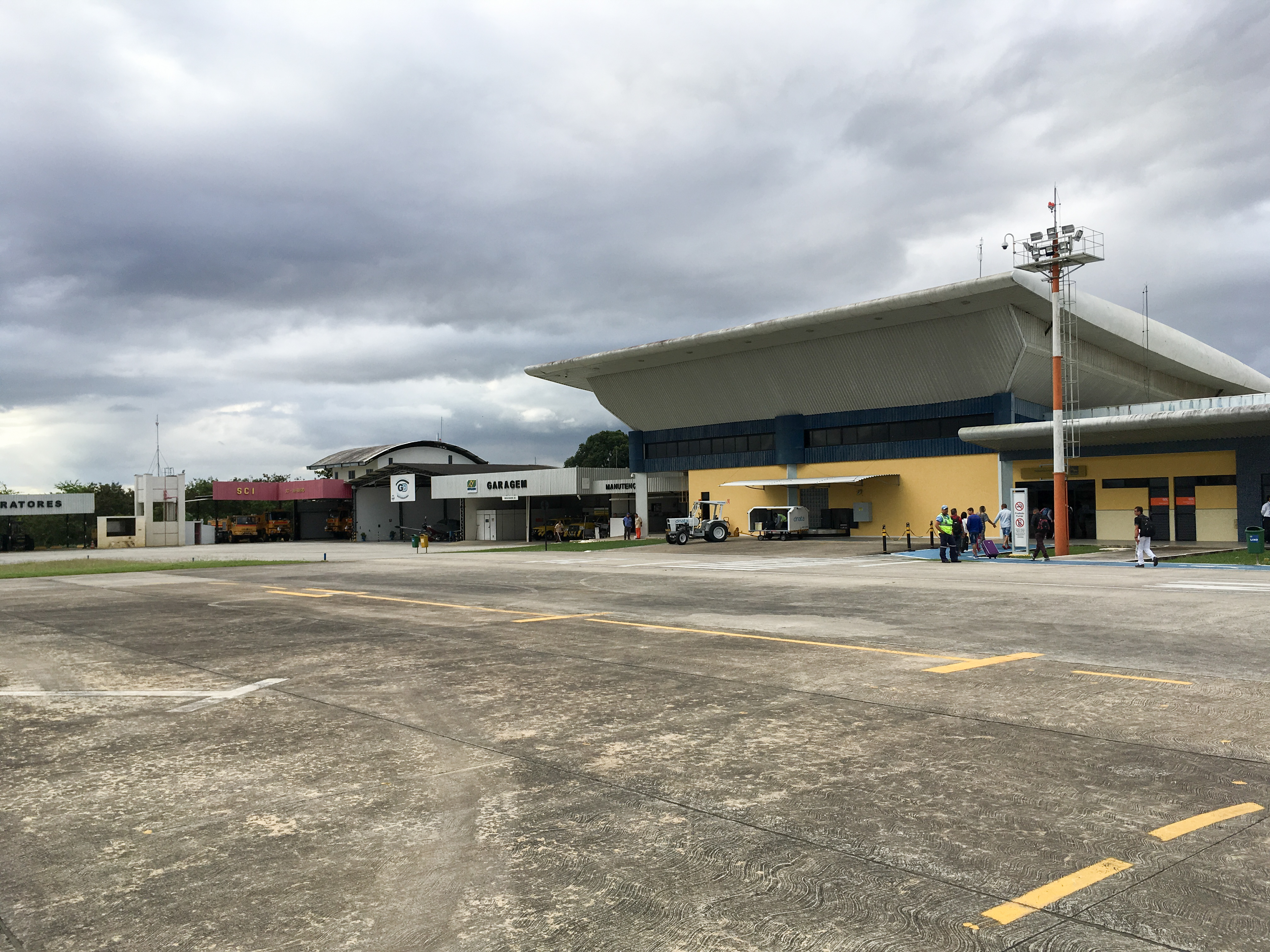
- IATA: CPV; ICAO: SBKG; LID: PB0003

Summary
- Airport type: Public
- Operator: Infraero (1980–2019); AENA (2019–present)
- Serves: Campina Grande
- Time zone: BRT (UTC−03:00)
- Elevation AMSL: 502 m (1,647 ft)
- Coordinates: 07°16′09″S 035°53′42″W
- Website: www.aenabrasil.com.br/pt/aeroportos/aeroporto-de-campina-grande-presidente-joao-suassuna/index.html

Map
- Location in Brazil

Runways
Direction	Length		Surface
Direction	m	ft	Surface
15/33	1,565	5,135	Asphalt

Statistics (2025)
- Passengers: 148,556 ▼43%
- Aircraft Operations: 3,522 ▼31%
- Metric tonnes of cargo: 533 ▼1%
- Statistics: AENA; Sources: Airport Website, ANAC, DECEA

Presidente João Suassuna Airport (IATA: CPV, ICAO: SBKG) is the airport serving Campina Grande, Brazil. Since August 2, 1960 it has been named after João Urbano Pessoa de Vasconcelos Suassuna (1886-1930), President of the State of Paraíba (at the time State Governors had the title of President) from 1924 to 1928.

It is operated by AENA.

== History ==
Even though the airport was inaugurated in 1963, since the 1940s air services operated to the site, using an existent runway.

Infraero became the operator of the airport in 1980. In 1984 and 1998 it made extensive renovations, which included a new terminal capable of handling 250,000 passengers/year, and the renovation of the apron and runway. In 2003 it was re-inaugurated.

On March 15, 2019 AENA won a 30-year concession to operate the airport, replacing Infraero.

== Airlines and destinations ==
Airlines	Destinations
Azul Brazilian Airlines	Belo Horizonte–Confins, Fortaleza, Maceió, Recife; Seasonal: Campinas
Gol Linhas Aéreas	Salvador da Bahia (ends 30 January 2027)
LATAM Brasil	Brasília

== Accidents and incidents ==
- 5 September 1958: a Lóide Aéreo Nacional Curtiss C-46D-15-CU Commando registration PP-LDX operating flight 652 from Recife crashed during approach to Campina Grande. Of a total of 18 people aboard, 2 crew members and 11 passengers died.

== Access ==
The airport is located 7 km (4 mi) from downtown Campina Grande.

== See also ==
- List of airports in Brazil
