= Bom Jesus da Lapa =

Municipality of Bahia, Brazil

Bom Jesus da Lapa Município de Bom Jesus da Lapa
- Municipality
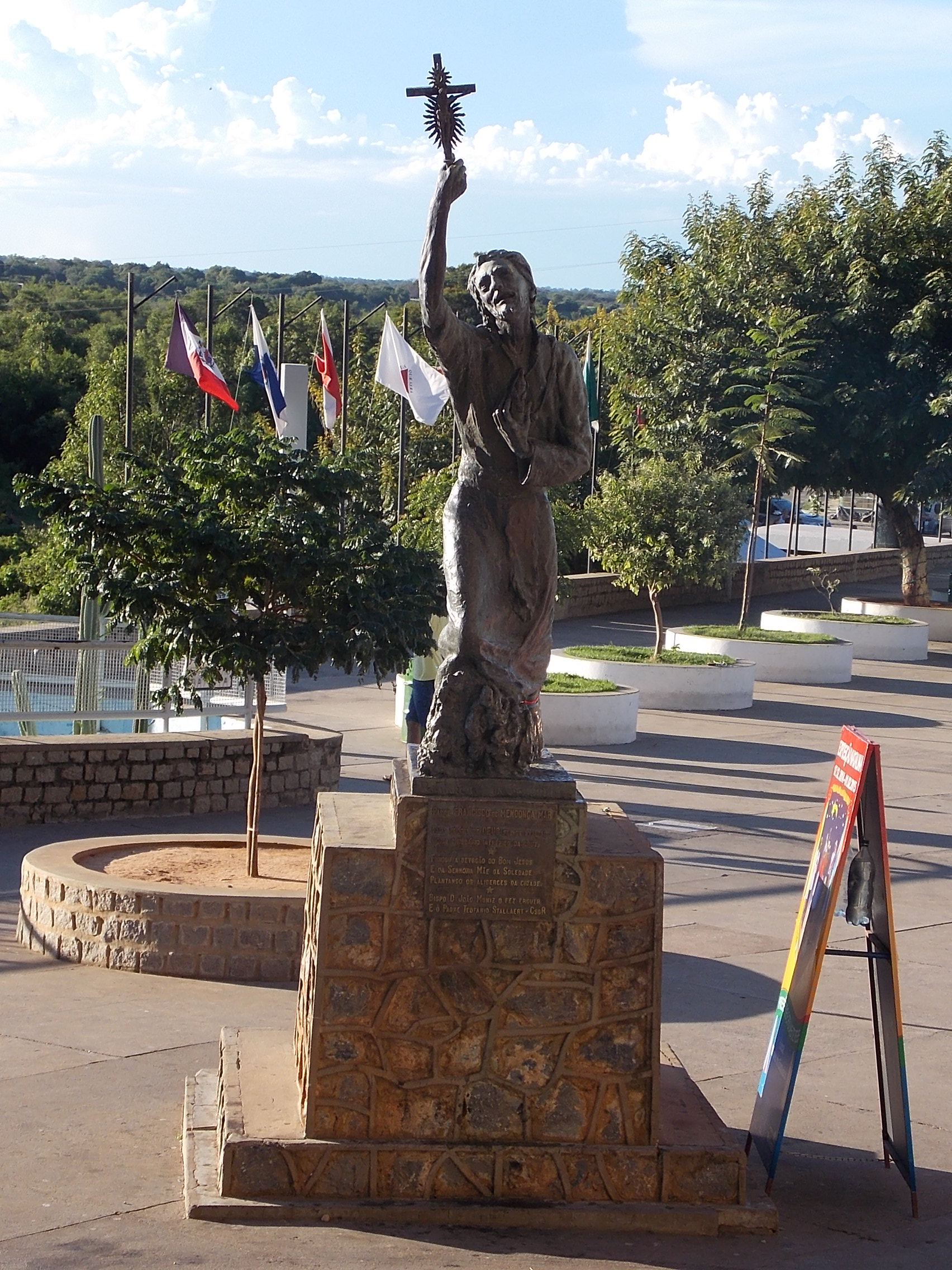
- Statue of Francisco da Soledade

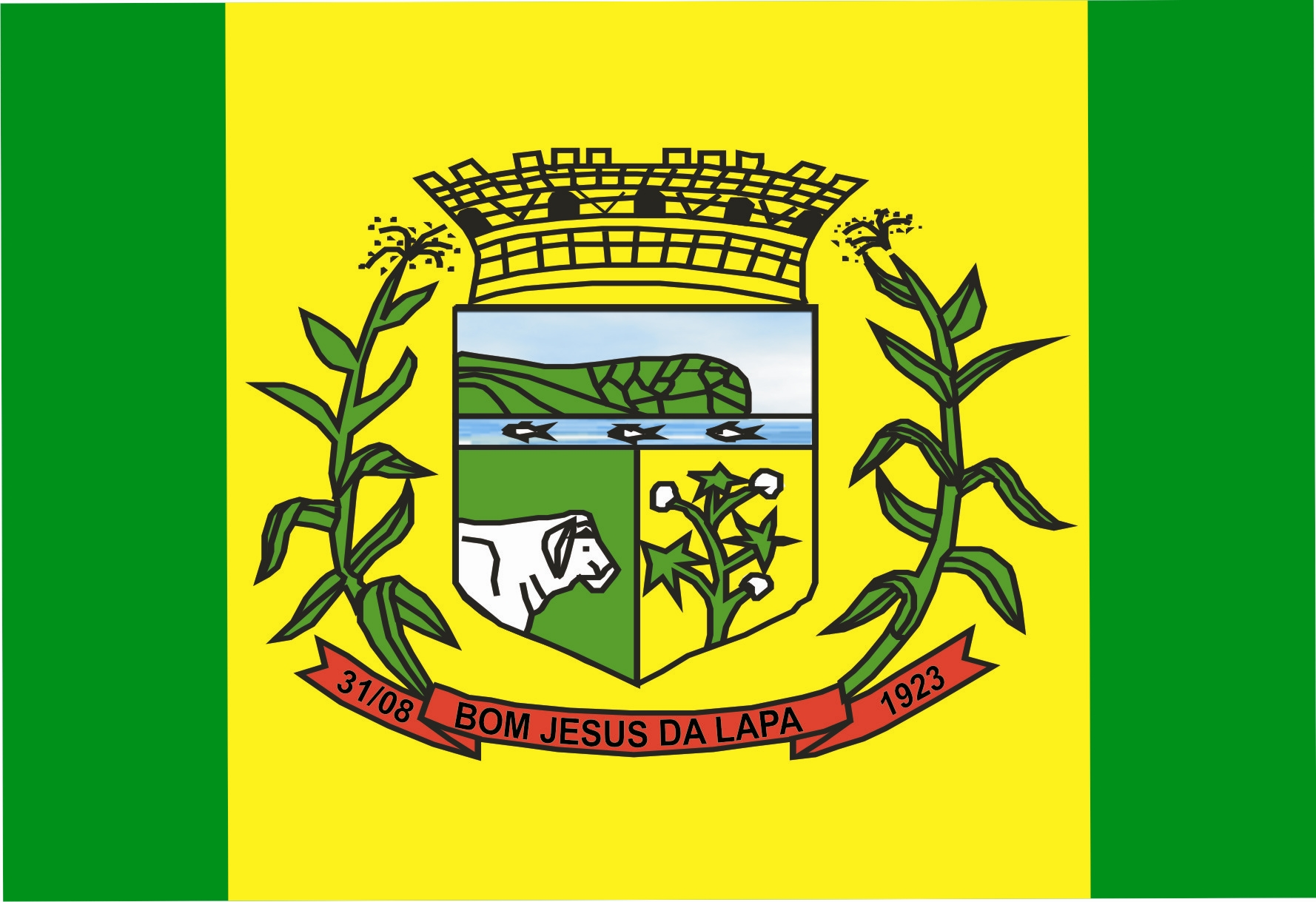
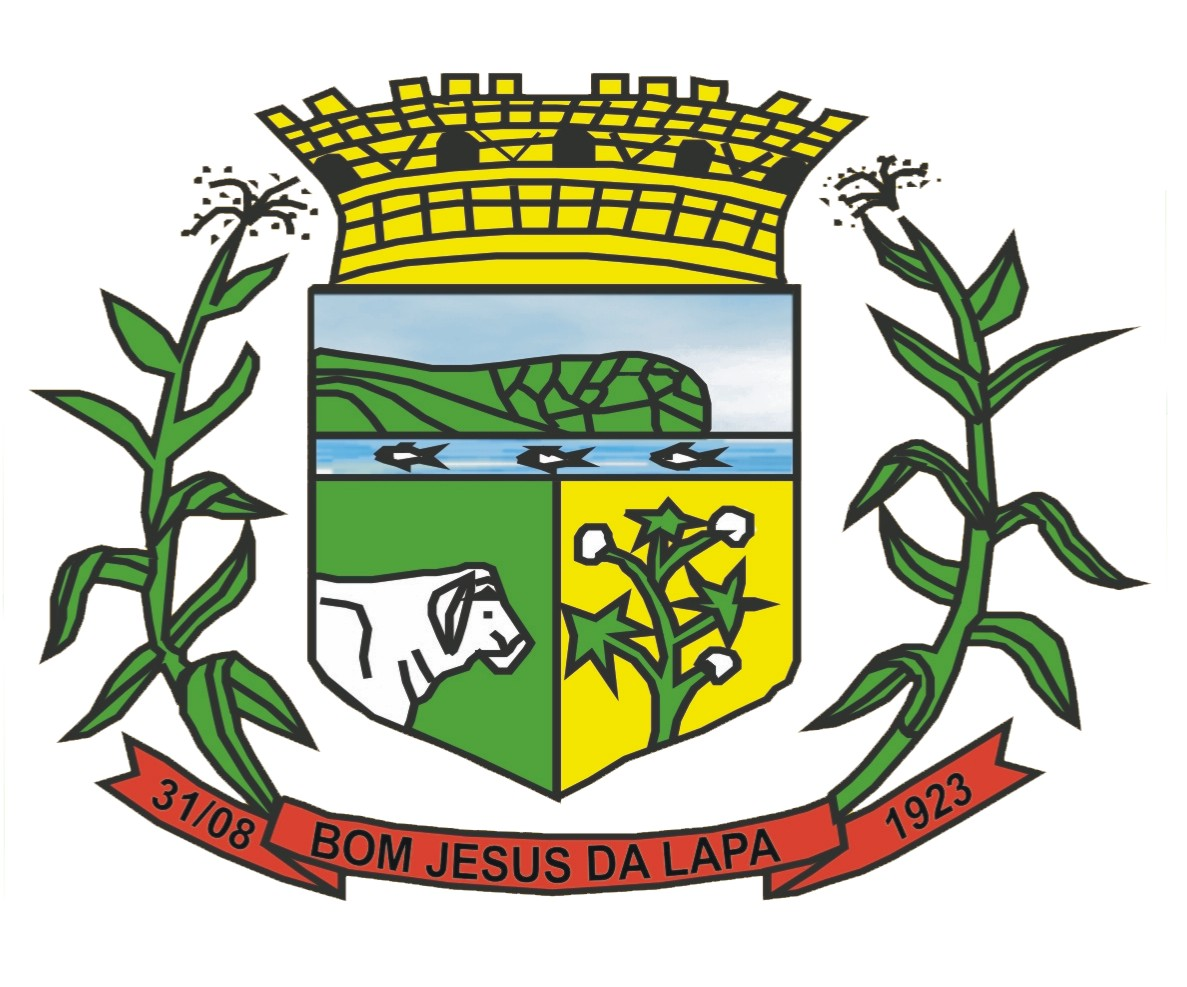
- Flag Coat of arms

- Location of Bom Jesus da Lapa in Bahia

- Location of Bom Jesus da Lapa in the Brazil
- Coordinates: 13°15′18″S 43°25′04″W
- Country: Brazil
- Region: Northeast
- State: Bahia
- Founded: August 31, 1923

Government
  - Mayor: Eures Ribeiro Pereira (2025–2028)

Area
  - Total: 4,115.524 km^{2} (1,589.013 sq mi)
- Elevation: 483.82 m (1,587.3 ft)

Population (2022)
  - Total: 65,550
  - Density: 15.93/km^{2} (41.25/sq mi)
- Demonym: Lapense
- Time zone: UTC−3 (BRT)
- Website: x

Bom Jesus da Lapa is a municipality in Bahia, Brazil located 796 kilometres (495 mi) from the state capital. The population as of 2022 was recorded at 65,550 according to the Brazilian Institute of Geography and Statistics. The city covers a total area of 4,115.5 square kilometres (1,589.0 mi^{2}) along the banks of the São Francisco River. Its economy is based on agriculture, commerce, tourism and fishing. The current mayor is Eures Ribeiro Pereira. It is the site of the Roman Catholic Diocese of Bom Jesus da Lapa.

The city is home to the third largest Catholic festival in Brazil, known as the Romaria (Portuguese for "Procession" or "Pilgrimage") of Bom Jesus drawing as many as 800,000 visitors or "Romeiros" to the city annually. For this reason, the city is known as "Capital Baiana da Fé" (The Bahian Capital of Faith) in Sanctuary of Bom Jesus da Lapa and Mãe da Soledade.

Bom Jesus da Lapa is distinguished by other cities in the region by its Gothic style wall and nearby caves.

== History ==
It is one of the older towns in Brazil being founded in 1693. It did not reach the status of city until 1923. The name means "Good Jesus of the Grotto." This might relate to a nearby cavern that naturally had "church-like" structures so was converted to a chapel. The chapel began in the seventeenth century and is a significant pilgrimage site in Brazil.

== Transportation ==
The city is served by Bom Jesus da Lapa Airport.

== Climate ==
Bom Jesus da Lapa has a hot semi-arid climate (Köppen: BSh) characterized by high temperatures throughout the year. The city experiences a distinct dry season from May to September, with minimal rainfall during these months. The wet season extends from October to April, with the heaviest rainfall occurring in December.

Climate data for Bom Jesus da Lapa (1991–2020)
Month	Jan	Feb	Mar	Apr	May	Jun	Jul	Aug	Sep	Oct	Nov	Dec	Year
Mean daily maximum °C (°F)	32.6 (90.7)	32.9 (91.2)	32.8 (91.0)	32.7 (90.9)	32.5 (90.5)	31.9 (89.4)	31.8 (89.2)	33.1 (91.6)	35.2 (95.4)	35.8 (96.4)	33.2 (91.8)	32.5 (90.5)	33.1 (91.6)
Daily mean °C (°F)	26.6 (79.9)	26.7 (80.1)	26.6 (79.9)	26.4 (79.5)	25.7 (78.3)	24.7 (76.5)	24.4 (75.9)	25.7 (78.3)	27.7 (81.9)	28.7 (83.7)	27.1 (80.8)	26.6 (79.9)	26.4 (79.5)
Mean daily minimum °C (°F)	21.6 (70.9)	21.6 (70.9)	21.7 (71.1)	21.2 (70.2)	19.9 (67.8)	18.3 (64.9)	17.5 (63.5)	18.4 (65.1)	20.5 (68.9)	22.3 (72.1)	22.1 (71.8)	21.7 (71.1)	20.6 (69.1)
Average precipitation mm (inches)	117.9 (4.64)	96.1 (3.78)	111.0 (4.37)	53.8 (2.12)	11.6 (0.46)	2.4 (0.09)	0.4 (0.02)	0.9 (0.04)	11.0 (0.43)	47.7 (1.88)	134.9 (5.31)	168.1 (6.62)	755.8 (29.76)
Average precipitation days (≥ 1.0 mm)	8.7	7.5	8.2	4.1	1.0	0.5	0.1	0.1	0.9	3.7	10.0	9.7	54.5
Average relative humidity (%)	69.0	69.8	71.0	67.1	59.8	54.9	51.0	46.3	44.0	48.3	64.4	68.2	59.5
Average dew point °C (°F)	21.0 (69.8)	21.4 (70.5)	21.6 (70.9)	20.7 (69.3)	18.6 (65.5)	16.4 (61.5)	15.0 (59.0)	14.8 (58.6)	15.6 (60.1)	17.5 (63.5)	20.0 (68.0)	20.8 (69.4)	18.6 (65.5)
Mean monthly sunshine hours	244.3	220.6	231.3	253.3	262.5	265.1	286.6	297.2	280.1	252.3	203.5	222.3	3,019.1
Source: NOAA

== See also ==
- List of municipalities in Bahia
