= Rui Moreira Lima =

Rui Barbosa Moreira Lima (June 12, 1919 – August 13, 2013) was a Brazilian military fighter pilot. At the beginning of 2013, he was one of only three fighter pilots veterans of Brazilian participation in World War II still alive.

Lima was born in Colinas. He was a member of the 1st Fighter Aviation Group (GAvCa) fighter pilot squadron of the Brazilian Air Force during World War II. During combat, he performed 94 missions. The first took place on November 6, 1944, and the last on May 1, 1945.

Moreover, he was commander of the Air Base Santa Cruz between August 14, 1962, and April 2, 1964, when he was away after the military coup.

He is the author of the book Senta a Pua!, in which he gives an account of fighting in Mediterranean Theater in Italy. Subsequently, the book has a version in documentary with the same name. In his latest book, Rui Moreira Lima: The War Diary (Publisher Adler, 2008) – tells of his first war mission until his last mission.

Until his death at Rio de Janeiro, aged 94, Lima had been struggling for amnesty.

== Honors ==
- Cruz de Aviação fita A
- Medalha da Campanha da Itália
- Presidential Unit Citation
- Medalha de Campanha do Atlantico Sul

== Books ==
- Senta a pua!, 1980.
- Rui Moreira Lima: O Diário de Guerra, 2008.

== See also ==
- Força Aérea Brasileira
- Brazilian Expeditionary Force
