= Alberto Martins Torres =

Alberto Martins Torres (Norfolk, 10 December 1919 – São Paulo, 30 December 2001) was a Brazilian aviator, born in the United States. He served with the 1st Brazilian Fighter Squadron, which operated with the Brazilian Expeditionary Force in Italy during the Second World War.
