= Bom Jesus da Lapa Airport =

Bom Jesus da Lapa Airport Aeroporto de Bom Jesus da Lapa
- IATA: LAZ; ICAO: SBLP; LID: BA0037

Summary
- Airport type: Public
- Serves: Bom Jesus da Lapa
- Opened: June 23, 1955
- Time zone: BRT (UTC−03:00)
- Elevation AMSL: 443 m (1,453 ft)
- Coordinates: 13°15′41″S 043°24′27″W

Map
- Location in Brazil

Runways
Direction	Length		Surface
Direction	m	ft	Surface
18/36	1,211	3,973	Asphalt
- Sources: ANAC, DECEA

Bom Jesus da Lapa Airport (IATA: LAZ, ICAO: SBLP) is the airport serving Bom Jesus da Lapa, Brazil.

== History ==
The airport was commissioned on June 23, 1955.

== Access ==
The airport is located 3 km (2 mi) from downtown Bom Jesus da Lapa.

== See also ==
- List of airports in Brazil
