= Fortaleza Airport =

Brazilian airport

Fortaleza–Pinto Martins International Airport Aeroporto Internacional de Fortaleza–Pinto Martins

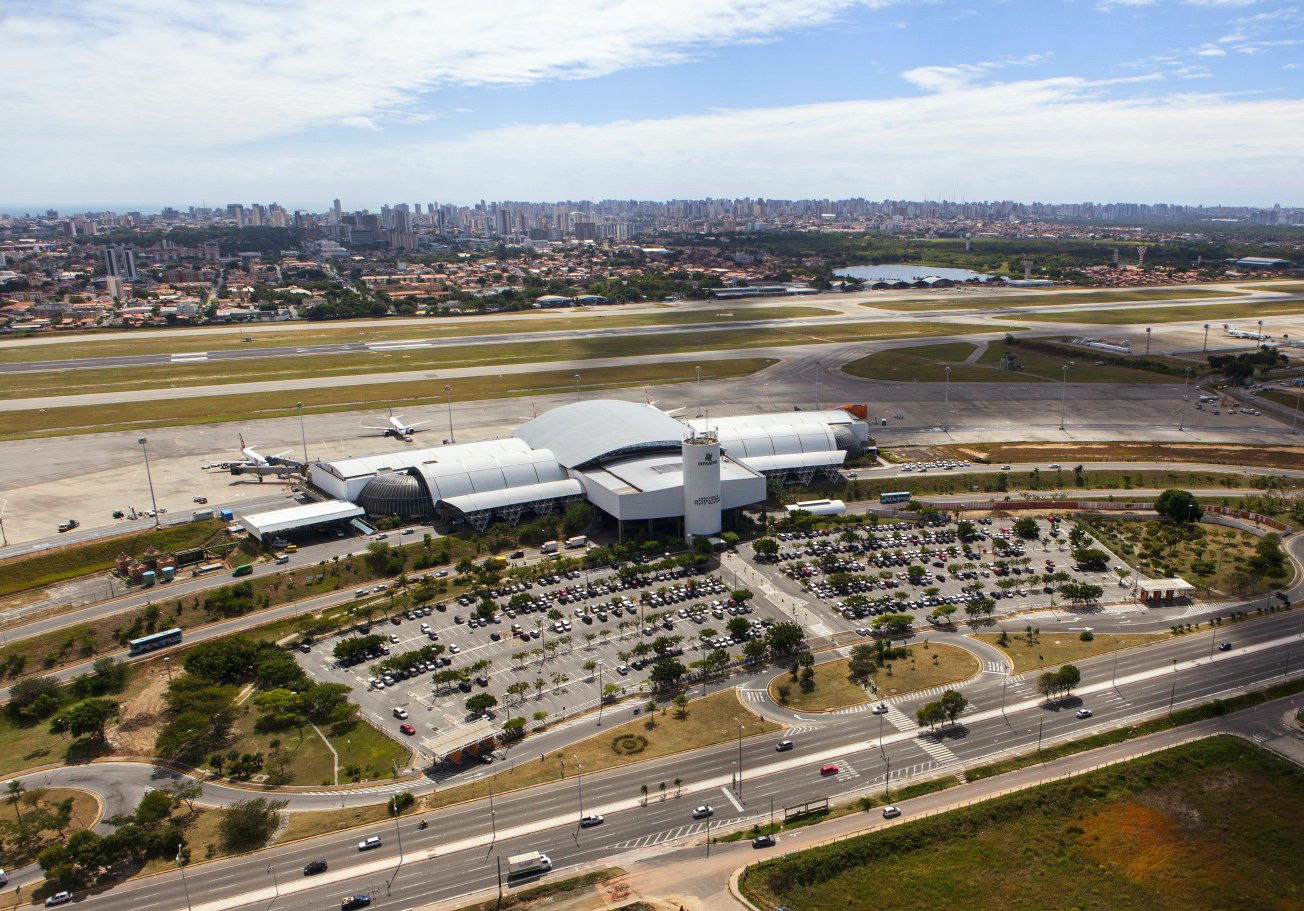
- IATA: FOR; ICAO: SBFZ; LID: CE0001

Summary
- Airport type: Public
- Operator: Infraero (1974–2017); Fraport Brasil (2017–present)
- Serves: Fortaleza
- Hub for: LATAM Brasil
- Time zone: BRT (UTC−03:00)
- Elevation AMSL: 25 m (82 ft)
- Coordinates: 03°46′33″S 038°31′56″W
- Website: fortaleza-airport.com.br/en

Map
- Location in Brazil

Runways
Direction	Length		Surface
Direction	m	ft	Surface
13/31	2,755	9,039	Asphalt

Statistics (2025)
- Passengers: 6,161,283 ▲9%
- Aircraft Operations: 55,200 ▲2%
- Metric tonnes of cargo: 49,844 ▲32%
- Statistics: Fraport; Sources: Airport Website, ANAC, DECEA

Fortaleza–Pinto Martins International Airport (IATA: FOR, ICAO: SBFZ), operated by Fraport Brasil, is the international airport, located 8 km (5 mi) south of downtown Fortaleza, Brazil. It is named after Euclides Pinto Martins (1892–1924), a Ceará-born aviator who in 1922 was one of the pioneers of the air link between New York City and Rio de Janeiro. Some facilities were shared with Fortaleza Air Force Base.

== History ==
The airport had its origins on a runway built in the 1930s and the location was used by Ceará Flying School until 2000. During World War II, the airport was an important Allied base supporting South Atlantic operations.

On May 13, 1952, the original name, Cocorote Airport, was changed to its present name paying tribute to Ceará-born aviator Euclides Pinto Martins.

On July 21, 1953, within a law prescribing rules for the naming of airports, the name of the facility was officially and exceptionally maintained as Pinto Martins Airport.

In 1966, a passenger terminal and apron were built. On the north area, this former passenger terminal now serves as a general aviation terminal for private aircraft, where general aviation, executive, and air taxi operations occur.

In 1997, the airport was upgraded to the status of international airport (Portaria 393 GM5, of June 9, 1997).

From January 7, 1974, to December 31, 2017, the facility was operated by Infraero. Through a partnership between Infraero, the federal government, and the state government, a new 35,000 m^{2} passenger terminal was built in the southern area. It was opened in February 1998.

On August 31, 2009, Infraero unveiled a BRL 525 million (US$276.6 million, EUR 193.8 million) investment plan to upgrade the airport focusing on the preparations for the 2014 FIFA World Cup, which was held in Brazil, Fortaleza being one of the venue cities. The investment focused on the renovation and enlargement of the passenger terminal, apron, and parking with completion due in November 2013.

Responding to critiques to the situation of its airports, on May 18, 2011, Infraero released a list evaluating some of its most important airports according to its saturation levels. According to the list, Fortaleza was considered to be requiring attention, operating between 70% and 85% of its capacity.

On March 16, 2017, the concession of the airport was auctioned to the consortium Fraport AG of Frankfurt, Germany, for R$425 million for use for 30 years. Among the improvements established in the contract signed on July 28, 2017, was to renew and complete the investments of Infraero related to the passenger terminal, and the lengthening of the runway. Following the auction, between June 2017 to 2018 a transition period took place in which Fraport and Infraero managed the airport. Since January 2, 2018, Fraport is the sole administrator.

On April 27, 2018, the construction of the two-story terminal extension started as well as expansion of the terminal and tracks, a remodeled taxi and traffic area, and a redesigned airport road system with a viaduct. On June 25, 2019, a 60-position check-in area was opened, and finally on April 14, 2020, the renovation was completed. Presently, the airport can handle 4 million passengers per year, and it has 14 aircraft parking positions.

Fraport launched the idea of an airport real estate project to call attention to investments in huge warehouses, shopping centers, and hotels, but nothing had been constructed.

The present facility covers 531 hectares (1,312 acres) of land with one runway.

On November 2026, it was presented the "Aeroparque Fortaleza", near the train station and in front of airport, without participation of Fraport, consisting in 3 buildings, including a 14-storey hotel, a similar 14-storey office tower and a Mall, invested by Grupo LC.

== Airlines and destinations ==
=== Passenger ===
Airlines	Destinations
Air France	Cayenne, Paris–Charles de Gaulle
Azul Brazilian Airlines	Belém, Belo Horizonte–Confins, Campina Grande, Campinas, Recife, São Paulo–Congonhas; Seasonal: Goiânia, Ribeirão Preto, São José do Rio Preto, Uberlândia
Gol Linhas Aéreas	Brasília, Buenos Aires–Aeroparque (ends 28 January 2027), Foz do Iguaçu (ends 30 January 2027), Manaus (ends 28 January 2027), Montevideo (ends 5 December 2026), Orlando (ends 30 January 2027), Recife, Rio de Janeiro–Galeão, Salvador da Bahia, São Paulo–Congonhas, São Paulo–Guarulhos; Seasonal: Buenos Aires–Ezeiza, Miami
Iberia	Madrid
LATAM Brasil	Belém, Belo Horizonte–Confins, Brasília, Juazeiro do Norte, Manaus, Natal, Parnaíba, Recife, Rio de Janeiro–Galeão, Salvador da Bahia, São Luís, São Paulo–Congonhas, São Paulo–Guarulhos, Teresina; Seasonal: Goiânia, Lisbon, Miami, Vitória
TAP Air Portugal	Lisbon

=== Cargo ===
Airlines	Destinations
Gol Transportes Aéreos	São Paulo–Guarulhos
Sideral Linhas Aéreas	São Paulo–Guarulhos

== Statistics ==
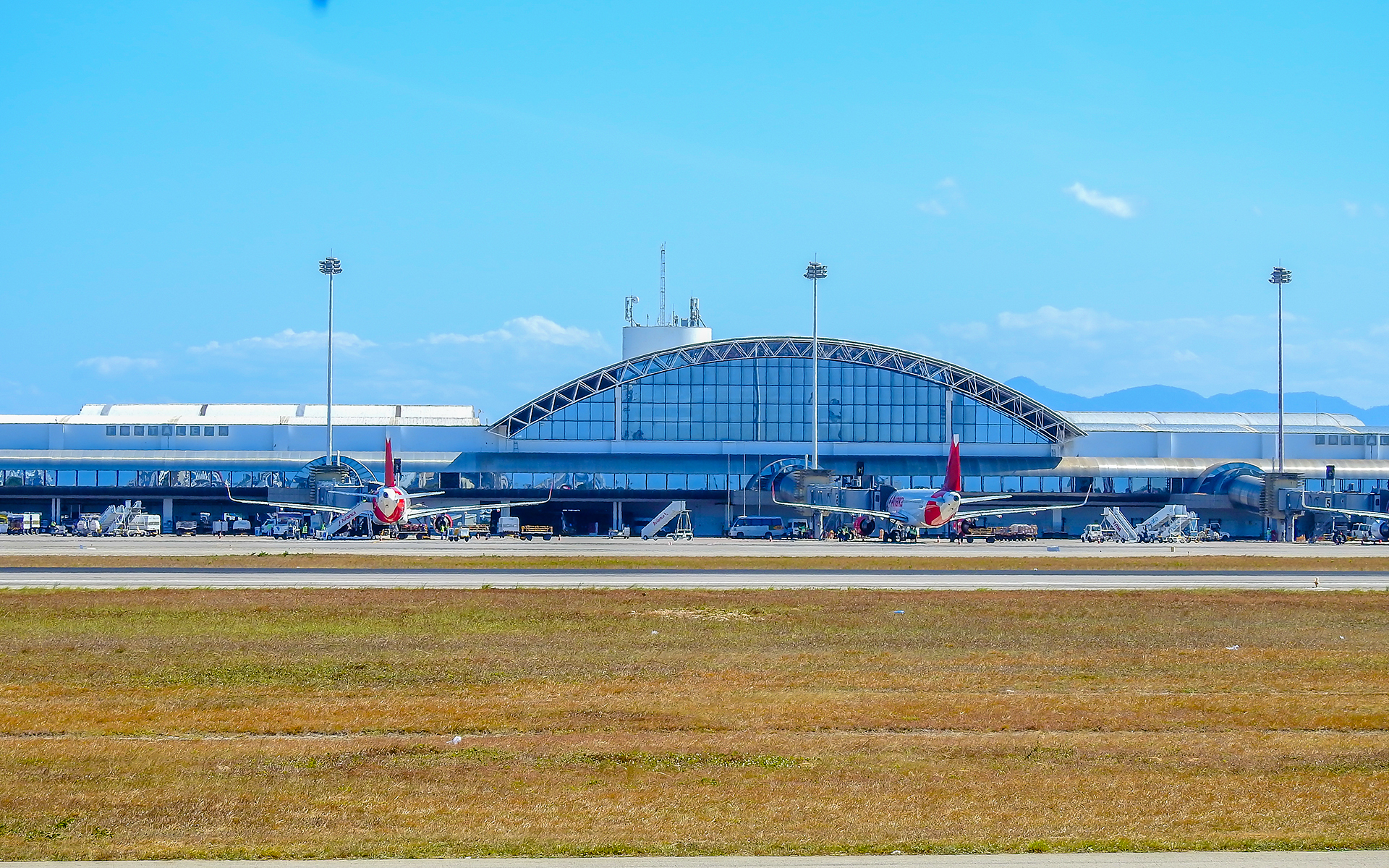
Airside terminal in 2017

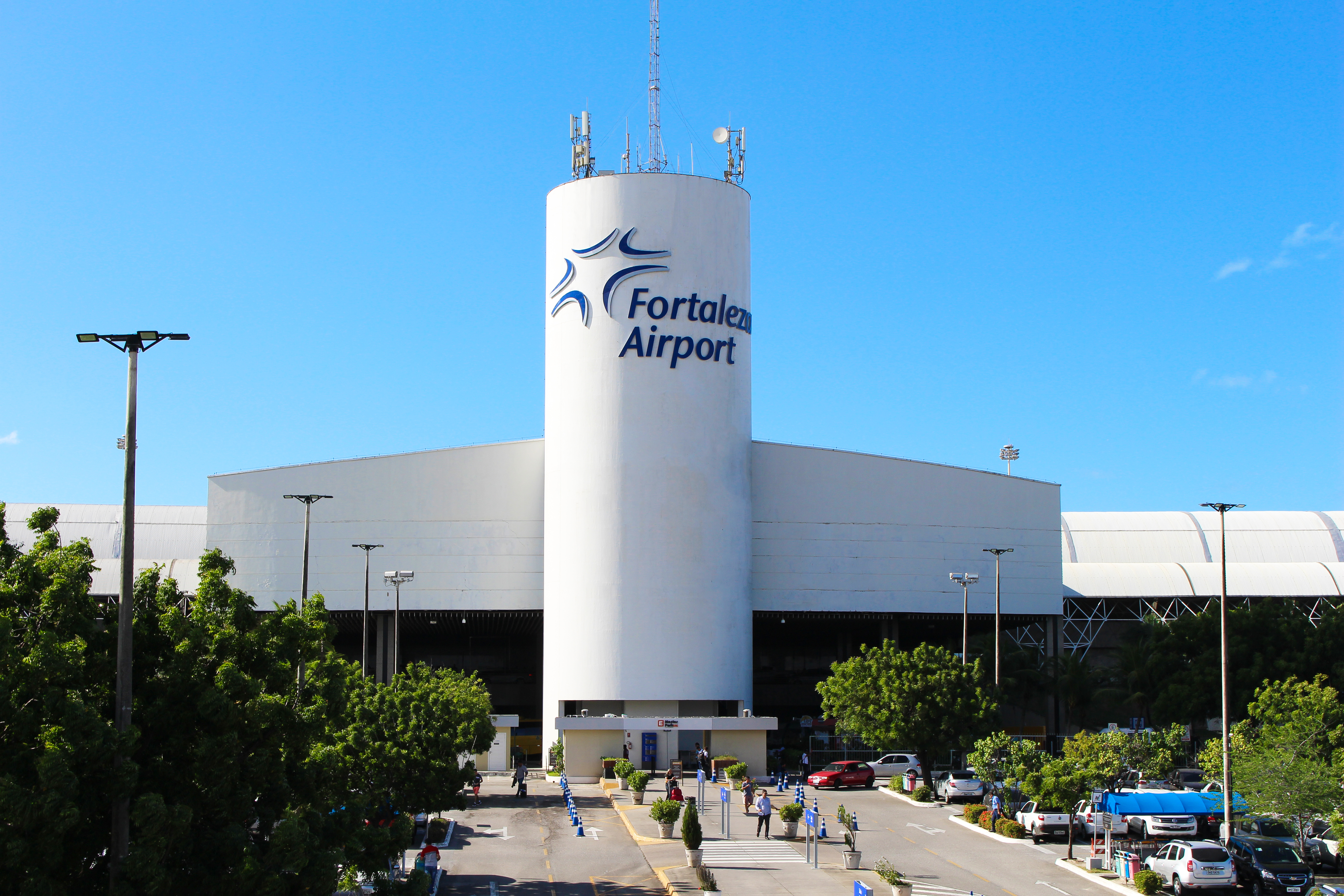
Land side entry in 2012

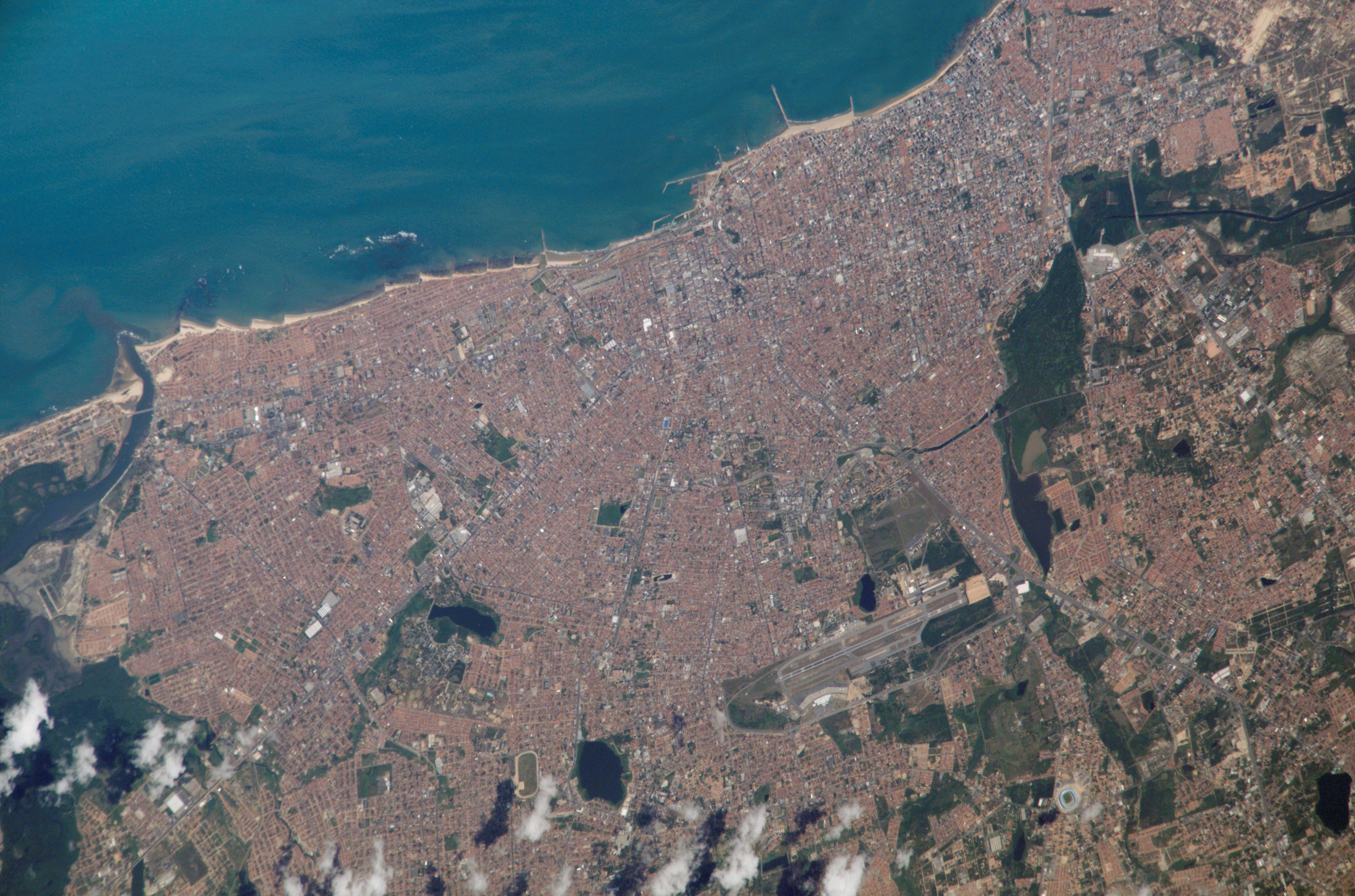
Aerial view in 2002

Following are the number of passenger, aircraft and cargo movements at the airport, according to Infraero (2007-2017) and Fraport Brazil (2018-2025) reports:

Year	Passenger	Aircraft	Cargo (t)
2025	6,161,283 ▲9%	55,200 ▲2%	49,844 ▲32%
2024	5,628,394 ▲1%	53,968 ▲1%	37,712 ▼40%
2023	5,564,542 ▼3%	53,199 ▼2%	62,768 ▲56%
2022	5,748,892 ▲45%	54,294 ▲31%	40,353 ▲18%
2021	3,971,382 ▲27%	41,343 ▲26%	34,155 ▲5%
2020	3,129,551 ▼57%	32,897 ▼45%	32,613 ▼33%
2019	7,211,701 ▲8%	59,693 ▲4%	48,341 ▲5%
2018	6,648,967 ▲12%	57,465 ▲10%	46,146 ▲8%
2017	5,935,288 ▲4%	52,290 ▼2%	42,756 ▲6%
2016	5,706,489 ▼10%	53,133 ▼14%	40,165 ▼15%
2015	6,347,543 ▼2%	61,556 ▼10%	47,087 ▼7%
2014	6,501,822 ▲9%	68,695 ▲3%	50,504 ▲28%
2013	5,952,629	66,814 ▲2%	39,389 ▼11%
2012	5,964,308 ▲6%	65,391 ▼1%	44,310 ▼12%
2011	5,647,104 ▲11%	65,853 ▲5%	50,380 ▲4%
2010	5,072,721 ▲20%	62,570 ▲21%	48,336 ▲24%
2009	4,211,651 ▲21%	51,861 ▲9%	38,923 ▲8%
2008	3,465,791 ▼4%	47,703 ▲1%	36,153 ▼5%
2007	3,614,439	47,226	38,172

== Accidents and incidents ==
- June 8, 1982: a VASP Boeing 727-212 registration PP-SRK operating flight 168 from Rio de Janeiro-Galeão to Fortaleza collided with a mountain during approach procedures 25 km (16 mi; 13 nmi) south to airport. Aircraft descended too low during approach. All 137 passengers and crew died.
- October 21, 1998: a Capital Táxi Aéreo Embraer EMB 120 Brasília crashed into a house 2 km (1.2 mi; 1.1 nmi) short of the runway during approach. All three people on board and one person on the ground died.

== See also ==
- List of airports in Brazil
- Fortaleza Air Force Base
