= Zumbi dos Palmares International Airport =

Airport in Brazil

Maceió–Zumbi dos Palmares International Airport Aeroporto Internacional de Maceió–Zumbi dos Palmares

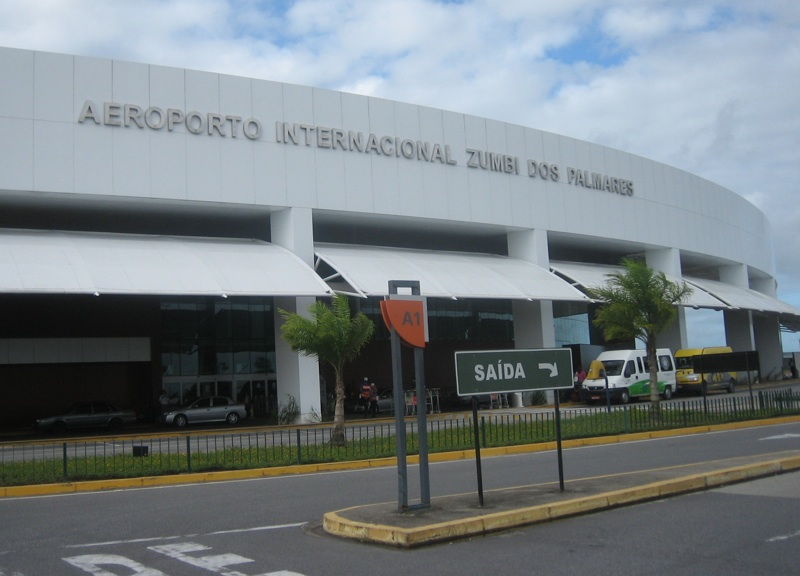
- IATA: MCZ; ICAO: SBMO; LID: AL0001

Summary
- Airport type: Public
- Operator: Infraero (1975–2019); AENA (2020–present)
- Serves: Maceió
- Opened: October 14, 1928
- Time zone: BRT (UTC−03:00)
- Elevation AMSL: 118 m (387 ft)
- Coordinates: 09°31′02″S 035°47′01″W
- Website: www.aenabrasil.com.br/pt/aeroportos/aeroporto-internacional-de-maceio-zumbi-dos-palmares/index.html

Map
- Location in Brazil

Runways
Direction	Length		Surface
Direction	m	ft	Surface
12/30	2,602	8,537	Asphalt

Statistics (2025)
- Passengers: 2,976,558 ▲11%
- Aircraft Operations: 24,373
- Metric tonnes of cargo: 3,948 ▲15%
- Statistics: AENA; Sources: Airport Website, ANAC, DECEA

Maceió–Zumbi dos Palmares International Airport (IATA: MCZ, ICAO: SBMO), formerly called Campo dos Palmares Airport, is an international airport serving Maceió, Brazil. Since 16 December 1999 the airport has been named after Zumbi dos Palmares one of the pioneers of resistance to slavery in Brazil.

The airport has been operated since February 2020 by AENA.

== History ==
On July 21, 1953, within a law prescribing rules for the naming of airports, the name of the facility was officially and exceptionally maintained as Palmares Airport. However, on 16 December 1999 its name was changed to celebrate Zumbi dos Palmares (1645–1695) one of the pioneers of resistance to slavery in Brazil.

The airport complex underwent major expansion in 2005, in which the new passenger terminal and the apron were renovated followed by the runway which was extended to 2,602 meters.

Previously operated by Infraero, on 15 March 2019 AENA won a 30-year concession to operate the airport.

On 13 July 2023, AENA inaugurated some modernization works at the airport, providing it with completely renovated spaces and large operational areas, new quality parameters in the management of all activities, from environmental and safety adaptations to expansions and restructuring of physical spaces.

== Airlines and destinations ==
Airlines	Destinations
Azul Brazilian Airlines	Belo Horizonte–Confins, Campina Grande, Campinas, Goiânia, Recife, São Paulo–Congonhas; Seasonal: Araçatuba, Bauru/Arealva, Cuiabá, Curitiba, Maringá, Presidente Prudente, Riberão Preto, São José do Rio Preto, São Paulo–Guarulhos, Uberlândia
Gol Linhas Aéreas	Belo Horizonte–Confins, Brasília, Buenos Aires–Ezeiza, Rio de Janeiro–Galeão, Salvador da Bahia, São Paulo–Congonhas, São Paulo–Guarulhos
JetSmart Argentina	Buenos Aires–Ezeiza (begins 3 December 2026)
LATAM Brasil	Brasília, São Paulo–Congonhas, São Paulo–Guarulhos; Seasonal: Buenos Aires–Ezeiza (begins 15 December 2026), Goiânia, Rio de Janeiro–Galeão
TAP Air Portugal	Lisbon

== Statistics ==
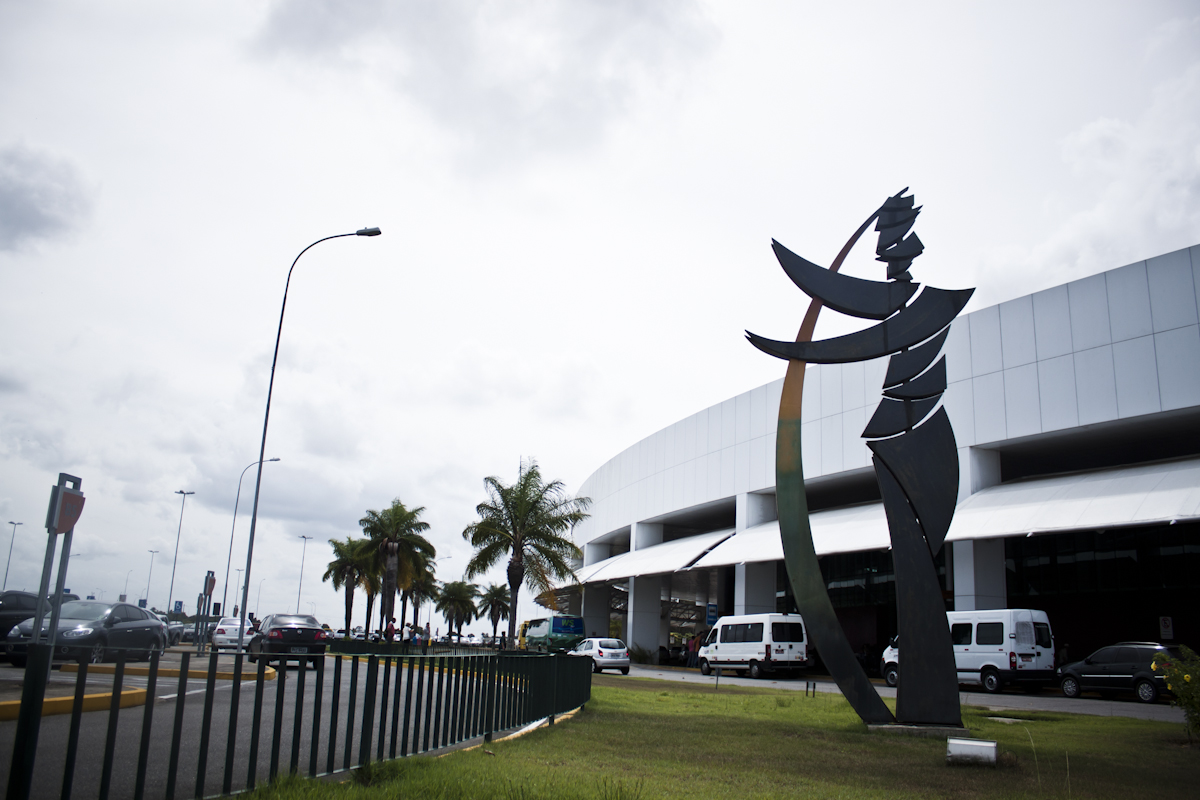
Sculpture at the entry of the airport

Following are the number of passenger, aircraft and cargo movements at the airport, according to Infraero (2007-2019) and AENA (2020-2025) reports:

Year	Passenger	Aircraft	Cargo (t)
2025	2,976,558 ▲11%	24,373	3,948 ▲15%
2024	2,687,790 ▲14%	24,353 ▲13%	3,441 ▲1%
2023	2,353,351 ▲2%	21,489	3,412 ▲53%
2022	2,301,932 ▲19%	21,409 ▲15%	2,235 ▲12%
2021	1,936,997 ▲66%	18,565 ▲56%	2,001 ▲60%
2020	1,165,064 ▼45%	11,883 ▼34%	1,253 ▼57%
2019	2,128,766 ▼3%	17,938 ▼3%	2,883 ▼8%
2018	2,192,562 ▲6%	18,548 ▲3%	3,140 ▲42%
2017	2,068,245 ▲4%	17,954 ▼9%	2,204 ▲1%
2016	1,995,069 ▲1%	19,748 ▲1%	2,177 ▼1%
2015	1,982,393 ▲5%	19,542 ▼5%	2,200 ▼5%
2014	1,893,688 ▼3%	20,478 ▼13%	2,305
2013	1,943,437 ▲13%	23,583 ▲16%	2,304 ▼22%
2012	1,719,979 ▲11%	20,294	2,960 ▼7%
2011	1,549,228 ▲8%	20,226 ▼10%	3,174 ▲20%
2010	1,431,781 ▲28%	22,594 ▲50%	2,652 ▼9%
2009	1,117,250 ▲17%	15,038 ▼10%	2,925 ▼6%
2008	957,744 ▲2%	16,668 ▼7%	3,123 ▼11%
2007	937,305	17,988	3,526

== Access ==
The airport is located 25 km (16 mi) from downtown Maceió.

== See also ==
- List of airports in Brazil
