= List of accidents and incidents involving the Curtiss C-46 Commando =

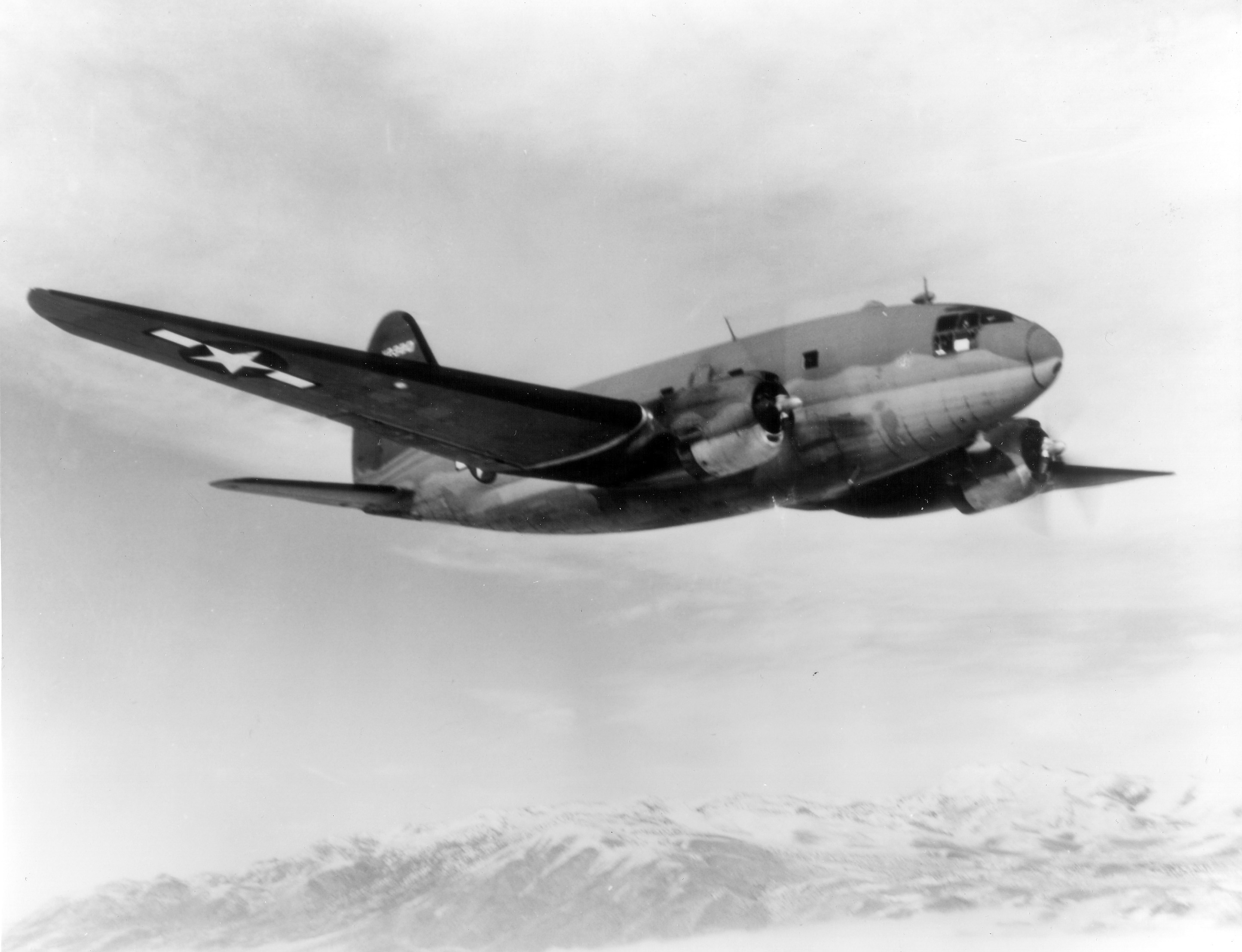
Wartime photo, USAAF

The Curtiss C-46 Commando was a transport aircraft originally derived from a commercial high-altitude airliner design. It was instead used as a military transport during World War II by the United States Army Air Forces as well as the U.S. Navy/Marine Corps under the designation R5C. Known to the men who flew them as "The Whale," or the "Curtiss Calamity," the C-46 served a similar role as its counterpart, the Douglas C-47 Skytrain, but was not as extensively produced.

After World War II, a few surplus C-46 aircraft were briefly used in their original role as passenger airliners, but the glut of surplus C-47s dominated the marketplace with the C-46 soon relegated to primarily cargo duty. The type continued in U.S. Air Force service in a secondary role until 1968. However, the C-46 continues in operation as a rugged cargo transport for Arctic and remote locations with its service life extended into the 21st century.

== Accidents and incidents ==
Like every other major type in long service and operation, accidents and incidents have been recorded that have substantially reduced the numbers flying. The following list is typical of such a record of operational use.

=== 1940s ===
- 20 September 1944: USAAF C-46A 42-107397 went missing during a nighttime navigation training mission both leaving and returning to Syracuse Army Air Base. The wreckage was found in August 1945 on NE face of Blue Ridge Mountain near Speculator, NY. All three servicemen perished.
- 2 February 1945: USMC R5C-1 39504 disappeared south of Los Angeles with seven on board.
- 4 February 1945: While flying over remote jungle 55 mi northwest of Jorhat, USAAF C-46A 42-107386 developed mechanical problems that led to an in-flight fire and crashed near the top of a jungle-covered hill at 6559 feet and burned out, killing 34 of 35 on board.
- 4 March 1945: USAAF C-46A 44-77654 was shot down by anti-aircraft fire and crashed off Orfordness after it wandered into a restricted area over the English Channel after the pilot got lost, killing the four crew. The crew was returning from dropping off a Waco CG-13A glider in France.
- 6 May 1945: USAAF C-46D 44-77839 hit a radar tower when flying in low cloud and crashed into Gibbet Hill, Hindhead, England, killing all 30 on board and 1 on the ground.
- 23 May 1945: USAAF C-46D 44-77507 crashed at Taillefontaine, France due to an engine fire, killing all 44 on board.
- 14 June 1945: USAAF C-46D 44-77948 crashed near Oakridge, Mississippi due to loss of control after the aircraft was struck by lightning, killing 17 of 18 on board.
- 28 September 1945: USAAF C-46D 42-101183 crashed 20 mi southeast of Chihkiang, killing 20.
- 5 October 1945: USAAF C-46A 41-5190 struck Mount Baldy in the San Gabriel Mountains, killing all four on board.
- 10 October 1945: USAAF C-46D 44-78490 struck the north face of Sarwaged Mountain (14 mi north of Boana, Papua New Guinea) in poor weather, killing the five crew.
- 12 October 1945: While trying to navigate their approach to Beijing Nanyuan Airport, USAAF C-46F 44-78591 (carrying four US crew and 55 Chinese soldiers) struck a radio antenna and crashed, killing all on board in the deadliest accident involving the C-46.
- 26 October 1945: USAAF C-46D 44-77561 crashed in a forest 42 mi east of Coos Bay, Oregon while attempting to return to Fresno due to poor visibility, killing three of 12 on board; the crew bailed out at some point after which the aircraft crashed. Five survivors were found two days later and the remaining four were found later on; two of the dead were found in the wreckage and the third remained missing as of 5 December 1945.
- 30 October 1945: USAAF C-46A 43-47228 crashed into a hill after takeoff from Zhijiang after the aircraft did not gain sufficient altitude due to possible engine problems, killing 45 of 50 on board.
- 13 July 1946: A Central Air Transport C-46 crashed just after takeoff from Jinan Airport due to engine failure, killing 13 of 49 on board.
- 10 December 1946: US Marine Corps R5C-1 39528 en route from San Diego to Seattle crashed into South Tahoma Glacier on the side of Mount Rainier in Washington, killing all 32 US Marines on board. The pilot was flying entirely by instruments in severe weather and it was determined that wind had moved the aircraft off course. At the time, this accident was the worst in U.S. aviation history.
- 25 December 1946: In what would be known as China's "Black Christmas", a China National Aviation Corporation C-46 (115) crashed while on approach to Longhua Airport in poor visibility, killing 31 of 36 on board (some sources say 29 dead); this aircraft was one of three that crashed on this night.
- 5 January 1947: A China National Aviation Corporation C-46 (XT-T51 / 121) struck a mountain west of Qingdao, China, killing all 43 on board. All Chinese commercial aircraft were grounded for a week pending investigation of this crash as well as the three crashes a week earlier.
- 28 January 1947: A China National Aviation Corporation C-46 (XT-T45 / 145) crashed 30 minutes after takeoff from Hankou, killing 25 of 26 on board.
- 14 February 1947: A Slick Airways C-46E (NC59486) crashed at Denver due to a loss of control, killing both pilots.
- 21 August 1947: A Slick Airways C-46E (NC59488) crashed at Hanksville, Utah after entering a thunderstorm, killing all three on board; the aircraft struck a mountain while flying too low.
- 20 January 1948: A China National Aviation Corporation C-46 crashed on takeoff from Mukden, China, killing 11 of 54 on board.
- 16 May 1948: A Slick Airways C-46E (NC56489) crashed near Port Columbus International Airport due to a loss of control following structural failure of the tail, killing both pilots.
- 23 May 1948: Still bearing the registration of Panamanian airline LAPSA, Israeli Air Force C-46 RX-136 crashed on a slope near Latrun in poor visibility; the navigator died when the fuselage of an Avia S-199 the aircraft was carrying broke loose and slid forward into the cockpit.
- 29 July 1948: A Civil Air Transport C-46D (XT-822) crashed at Qingdao Airport after entering a spin after takeoff, killing all 19 on board.
- 24 October 1948: A Transandina Ecuador C-46 (HC-SIA) crashed in a lagoon near Cozumel, Mexico while attempting to land, killing all eight on board.
- 5 December 1948: A Central Air Transport C-46 (XT-538) crashed at Kiangwan, killing nine of 40 on board.
- 5 March 1949: USAF C-46D 44-77335 crashed shortly after takeoff from Naha AFB, killing six of 22 on board.
- 27 May 1949: A Trans-Air Hawaii C-46F (N5615V) crashed and burned at Maui, Hawaii due to wing separation caused by an engine fire, killing both pilots; the fire was caused by a number eight cylinder failure on the number two engine.
- 2 June 1949: A Central Air Transport C-46 (XT-520) crashed 200 mi N of Chongqing, killing the three crew.
- 7 June 1949: A Strato-Freight C-46D (NC92857) crashed on Climbout from Isla Grande Airport following a loss of power in the right engine due to maintenance errors, killing 53 of 81 on board; the accident remains the worst in Puerto Rico.
- 12 July 1949: Standard Air Lines Flight 897R (a C-46E, N79978) crashed at Chatsworth, California, due to pilot error, killing 35 of 48 on board.
- 19 July 1949: An Air Transport Associates C-46F (N5075N) crashed on takeoff from Boeing Field after the left engine lost power, probably due to use of low-octane fuel, killing two of 32 on board; one person on the ground also died.
- 2 August 1949: A Varig C-46D (PP-VBI) operating a flight from São Paulo-Congonhas Airport to Porto Alegre made an emergency landing on rough terrain near the location of Jaquirana, approximately 20 minutes before landing in Porto Alegre, following fire on the cargo hold. Of the 36 passengers and crew aboard, five died.
- 9 October 1949: Slick Airways Flight 11-8 (a C-46E, NC59485) crashed near Cheyenne, Wyoming due to loss of control caused by icing and severe turbulence, killing all three on board.
- 4 December 1949: A Civil Air Transport C-46 crashed in China, killing the five crew; the aircraft was carrying a cargo of fuel.
- 9 December 1949: A Civil Air Transport C-46D (XT-820) crashed near Lanzhou, killing all 38 on board.
- 10 December 1949: A Civil Air Transport C-46D (XT-814) crashed at Haikou, killing 17 of 40 on board.

=== 1950s ===
- 27 May 1950: A Regina Cargo Airlines C-46F (N9406H) crashed on takeoff from Teterboro Airport due to overloading and engine problems, killing one of the pilots; the airline's AOC was suspended following the crash.
- 5 June 1950: A Westair Transport C-46F (N1248N) operating a flight from San Juan, PR to Wilmington, NC ditched into the Atlantic 300 miles east of Melbourne, Florida due to failure of both engines for reasons unknown. It sank in one of the deepest areas of the Atlantic and could not be recovered. Of the 65 passengers and crew aboard, 28 died.
- 23 July 1950: USAF C-46D 44-77577 lost control and crashed shortly after takeoff from Myrtle Beach AFB after the left aileron separated, killing all 39 on board.
- 8 January 1951: USAF C-46D 44-78505 crashed on landing at Chungju (K-41) Air Base, South Korea; the aircraft struck two other C-46Ds, 44-78270 and 44-78262. Two of three on board 478505 died.
- 14 February 1951: A LANSA C-46A (HK-333) crashed near Yalí, Colombia, killing both pilots.
- 25 February 1951: USAF C-46D 44-78257 crashed into high ground near Iwakuni MCAS while returning to Taegu (K-2) Air Base, killing the three crew.
- 29 July 1951: A Lóide Aéreo Nacional C-46A (CB-39), flying from Cochabamba to Rio de Janeiro, probably operating a delivery ferry flight still bearing the Bolivian registration number, crashed on takeoff. All seven occupants died.
- 27 September 1951: USAF C-46D 44-77713 struck Mount Tanazawa, killing all 14 on board.
- 16 December 1951: A Miami Airlines C-46F (N1678M) stalled and crashed at Elizabeth, New Jersey due to an engine fire, killing all 56 on board. The aircraft was leased from the USAF.
- 29 December 1951: Continental Charters Flight 44-2 (a C-46A, N3944C) struck Bucktooth Ridge near Napoli, New York due to pilot error, killing 26 of 40 on board.
- 30 December 1951: Transocean Air Lines Flight 501 (a C-46F, N68963) crashed near Fairbanks, Alaska due to spatial disorientation caused by pilot error, killing all four on board.
- 5 April 1952: US Airlines Flight 4–2, a C-46F (N1911M), was on a maneuvering flight from Fort Lauderdale to Teterboro when it lost and control and crashed near Idlewild Airport following a sudden engine failure, killing both pilots and three people on the ground.
- 18 April 1952: Robin Airlines Flight 416W (a C-46E, N8404C) crashed into a hill near Whitter, California after the pilot descended too low, killing all 29 on board. The aircraft was leased from Air Charters.
- 24 May 1952: A Lóide Aéreo Nacional C-46D (PP-LDE) during take-off from Manaus-Ponta Pelada stalled when trying to return to the airport following an engine failure. It crashed into the Rio Negro. The 6 occupants died.
- 4 August 1952: A private C-46A (N79096) crashed at Miami International Airport after the elevator control system failed due to poor maintenance, killing all four on board.
- 16 October 1952: USAF C-46D 44-77538 crashed off Kangnung Air Base after takeoff, killing all 25 on board.
- 15 November 1952: USAF C-46D 44-78114, of the 34th Troop Carrier Squadron, 315th Air Division, crashed in the Sea of Japan off Kangnung, South Korea after takeoff, killing 11 of 18 on board.
- 21 December 1952: A RANSA C-46D (YV-C-ARC) disappeared over the Atlantic en route to Miami with three on board.
- 7 January 1953: An Associated Air Transport C-46F (N1648M) crashed 8 mi west of Fish Haven, Idaho after the pilot involuntary descended into icing and turbulent conditions, killing all 40 on board; the wreckage was found five days later.
- 9 February 1953: Egyptian Air Force C-46D 1001 crashed in the desert 40 mi east of Cairo, killing 30 of 35 on board.
- 4 March 1953: Slick Airways Flight 162–3, a C-46F (N4717N), crashed near Bradley Field due to pilot error following a missed approach, killing both pilots.
- 20 August 1953: An Itaú C-46A (PP-ITD) crashed and caught fire during an emergency landing at Corumbá. Three crew members died and one survived.
- 28 September 1953: Resort Airlines Flight 1081, a C-46F (N66534) stalled and crashed while on approach to Standiford Field after the left elevator separated due to improper maintenance and incorrect parts, killing 25 of 41 on board. The aircraft was leased from the USAF.
- 15 December 1953: An Aviateca C-46D (TG-AQA) crashed into Cerro Tecpan, killing both pilots.
- 1 February 1954: USAF C-46D 44-48027 crashed off Hokkaido while the pilot was attempting to ditch the aircraft in the Tsugaru Straits following a possible in-flight fire, killing all 35 on board.
- 13 March 1954: An Aigle Azur Maroc C-46E (F-DAAR) was destroyed on the ground by mortar fire at Gia Lam Airport during the Battle of Dien Bien Phu.
- 4 June 1954: A Varig C-46A (PP-VBZ) operating a cargo flight between São Paulo-Congonhas Airport and Porto Alegre crashed during take-off from São Paulo. All crew of 3 died.
- 2 April 1955: An AAXICO Airlines C-46A (N51424) lost control and crashed off Pensacola, Florida after encountering turbulence while flying through a thunderstorm, killing both pilots.
- 3 April 1955: An Itaú C-46A (PP-ITG) struck a hill two miles short of the runway while on an instrument approach to Vitória. The crew of three died.
- 18 June 1955: A Tigres Voladores C-46 (XA-LID) struck trees and crashed on takeoff from Leon Airport due to engine failure, killing two of 42 on board.
- 13 July 1955: A Lineas Interamericana Aérea C-46 (HK-607) crashed at Capacho, Venezuela, killing three of four on board.
- 14 September 1955: An AVENSA C-46 (YV-C-EVL) disappeared over the Gulf of Venezuela with four crew on board.
- 17 December 1955: A Riddle Airlines C-46A (N9904F) broke up in mid-air following a loss of control and crashed in a cornfield near Hollywood, South Carolina, killing both pilots.
- 9 September 1956: A Jordan International Airlines C-46A (JY-ABV) bounced off a hill and crashed while attempting to return to Marka International Airport following problems on climbout, killing one of 57 on board.
- 4 March 1957: JASDF C-46D 51-1110 ditched off Miho Air Base, killing all 17 on board.
- 7 April 1957: A Varig C-46A (PP-VCF) operating a flight from Bagé to Porto Alegre crashed during takeoff from Bagé, following a fire developed in the left main gear wheel well and consequent technical difficulties. All 40 passengers and crew died.
- 19 June 1957: Two Western Hemisphere Import Export Co. C-46As (42-96685 and N8013N) were damaged in a storm at Panagarh after a hangar collapsed.
- 25 June 1957: A Sociedad Aeronautica Medellin (SAM) C-46D (HK-513) crashed near Guarne, Colombia for reasons unknown, killing both pilots.
- 3 October 1957: A Lebanese International Airways C-46A (OD-ACK) lost control and crashed off Beirut while attempting to return following a possible in-flight fire, killing all 27 on board.
- 30 March 1958: An Aerolíneas Nacionales C-46D (TI-1019) was forced down by rebels and crashed 35 mi from Havana.
- 31 May 1958: A Paraense C-46D (PP-BTB) crashed on climbout from Rio de Janeiro-Santos Dumont while operating a cargo flight. The crew of four died.
- 5 September 1958: A Lóide Aéreo Nacional C-46D (PP-LDX) crashed during approach to Campina Grande. Of a total of 18 people aboard, 2 crew members and 11 passengers died.
- 29 September 1958: A Republic of China Air Force C-46 was shot down over Formosa Strait during a supply flight, killing a crewmember; the remaining two were captured and taken prisoner.
- 16 November 1958: A Capitol Airways C-46F (N1301N) struck a mountain 23 mi west of Fort Collins, Colorado at 8700 feet in turbulence and icing conditions following engine failure, killing both pilots.
- 16 January 1959: Austral Líneas Aéreas Flight 205 crashed on approach to Mar del Plata killing 51 occupants: five crew members and 46 passengers. The cause of the crash was determined as pilot error.
- 21 January 1959: A Linea Expresa Bolivar (LEBCA) C-46D (YV-C-LBI) struck Páramo La Culata mountain (20 mi northeast of Mérida, Venezuela) in clouds, killing all four on board. The pilot was unfamiliar with the terrain and was flying too low.
- 30 March 1959: Riddle Airlines Flight 402 (a C-46A, N7840B) lost control and crashed at Alma, Georgia following a fire in the cargo hold, killing both pilots.
- 17 April 1959: A Tigres Voladores C-46F (XA-MIS) crashed near Bahía Kino following a possible mid-air explosion, killing all 26 on board.
- 6 May 1959: A Paraense C-46A (PP-BTA) crashed shortly after takeoff from Belém-Val de Cães. Three crew members died.
- 13 May 1959: A Transportes Aéreos Peruanos (TAPSA) C-46A (OB-WBP-507) crashed into a hillside 19 miles south of Tournavista, Peru, killing all 12 on board.
- 21 May 1959: A Lineas Aéreas Interpolar C-46 (CC-CIA-497) struck Cerro Shano mountain (near Moro, Peru), killing all eight on board.
- 1 June 1959: An Aerolíneas Nacionales C-46 (TI-1022) was shot down by a Nicaraguan Air Force P-51 over Nicaragua, resulting in the death of both pilots.
- 15 July 1959: A Paraense C-46A (PT-BEE) force-landed near Babaçulândia, Brazil following an in-flight fire, killing two of the three crew. The fire was caused by a fuel leak.
- 2 September 1959: Aaxico Airlines Flight 7002, (a C-46F, N5140B) stalled and crashed at Dyess AFB following a loss of elevator control, killing both pilots. Investigation revealed that a bolt had fallen out of the elevator control mechanism.
- 8 December 1959: A SAM C-46A (HK-515) crashed off Moron Island, Colombia for reasons unknown, killing all 45 on board. Eight days after the crash, the right main landing gear was found near Moron Island.

=== 1960s ===
- 19 March 1960: SAM Flight 901 (a C-46A, HK-516) crashed 7 mi northwest of Planeta Rica, Colombia due to engine failure and pilot error, killing 25 of 46 on board.
- 5 April 1960: A Líneas Aéreas de Nicaragua (LANICA) C-46A (AN-AIN) crashed on a hillside short after takeoff from Siuna Airport, killing two of 18 on board. The cause of the crash was traced to propeller problems.
- 22 September 1960: A Paraense C-46A (PP-BTF) crashed shortly after takeoff from Belém-Val de Cans. Seven occupants died.
- 29 October 1960: A chartered C-46 carrying the Cal Poly football team crashed on takeoff in Toledo, Ohio, causing the death of 22 of the 48 people on board.
- 7 December 1960: A Real C-46A (PP-AKF) belonging to Transportes Aéreos Nacional operating flight 570 from Cuiabá to Manaus-Ponta Pelada crashed on Cachimbo mountains. The no.2 engine failed during the flight. Altitude was lost, the pilot jettisoned some of the cargo but the aircraft continued to lose height. It crashed and caught fire and 15 passengers and crew died.
- 13 August 1961: A Curtiss C-46F transport plane operated by the CIA's Air America airline crashed near Pha Khao in Laos, killing all 5 crew members on board. The crew was on a mission to drop supplies for General Vang Pao's Hmong army when the plane suffered a mechanical problem.
- 30 April 1964: An Aerolineas Carreras C-46D (HK-527) made an emergency landing in the Andean region of Puna de Atacama, Argentina on a cargo flight between Lima, Peru and Buenos Aires, Argentina. All crew were safe and rescued, but a handful of thoroughbred mares they were shipping were lost.
- 20 June 1964: Civil Air Transport Flight 106 (a C-46D, B-908) crashed on climbout from Taichung Airport due to loss of control following engine problems, killing all 57 on board.
- 12 August 1965: A Paraense C-46A (PP-BTH) en route to Cuiabá caught fire and crashed in Buracão, close to Barra do Bugre, in the State of Mato Grosso. All 13 passengers and crew died.
- 11 July 1966: An Aeropesca Colombia C-46D (HK-527) disappeared near Cerro el Planchon, Chile on a cargo flight between El Dorado International Airport, Bogotá, Colombia and Buenos Aires, Argentina with the loss of a crew of eight.
- 16 April 1969: Shortly after takeoff, a CIA-chartered (operated by WIGMO) C-46 (9T-PLJ?) crashed into the Congo River, killing all 45 people on board. The pilot had reported a landing gear malfunction, and was trying to return to N'djili Airport.

=== 1970s ===
- 10 May 1973: A private C-46A (N446M) landed wheels-up near Ellington Field following engine problems; both pilots survived, but the aircraft was written off. The cause was traced to improper maintenance and pilot error.
- 22 February 1974: A SAVCO C-46A (CP-1052) lost control and crashed 5 mi southwest of San Francisco de Moxos, Bolivia after the cargo shifted, probably due to turbulence, killing all seven on board.
- 26 August 1974: A Tri-9 Corporation C-46F (N9760Z) was written off at Phnom Penh Airport following a rocket attack.
- 8 September 1974: A TAISA C-46D (TI-1010C) struck a mountainside near Port-au-Prince, Haiti due to engine failure, killing all four on board.
- 25 December 1974: A Cambodian International Airlines C-46A (XW-PKJ) crashed in a forest at Bannak, Cambodia, presumably killing both pilots. The aircraft was leased from Lane Xang Airlines.
- 24 April 1975: A SAVCO C-46D (CP-1063) struck Machu Sayari after the pilot descended too soon, killing all three on board.
- 19 October 1975: An Aerovias Las Minas C-46A (CP-992) crashed at Trinidad, Bolivia, killing the three crew.
- 16 September 1976: An Aerosucre Colombia C-46D (HK-1282) disappeared on a cargo flight en route to Queen Beatrix International Airport, Oranjestad, Aruba with two crew.
- 14 August 1978: An Aeropasca Colombia C-46F (HK-1350) struck Mount Paramo de Laura in bad weather, killing all 18 on board. The pilots did not realize the aircraft had been blown off course due to insufficient navigation equipment; the aircraft was also overloaded.
- 4 August 1979: An Aircraft Line Maintenance C-46A (N8040Y, ex Austral LV-FSA) was being ferried from Buenos Aires to Miami when it struck a glacier on Cerro Tupangato in the Andes and broke in three, killing the five crew; the wreckage was found in 1981 by a Chilean rescue team searching for a missing helicopter.
- 13 November 1979: A Lambair C-46F (C-GYHT) crashed after takeoff from Churchill, Manitoba. The aircraft, nicknamed Miss Piggy, was carrying a load of one snowmobile and many cases of pop when it lost oil pressure in the left engine shortly after take-off. The crew attempted to land the aircraft, crashing several hundred meters short of the runway. Two of the three crew members were injured. The wreckage remains in place today.

=== 1980s ===
- 15 November 1980: A BWI Leasing C-46A (N355BY) crashed off Norman's Cay, Bahamas; there were no casualties, but the aircraft was written off.

=== 2000s ===
- On July 9, 2000, a private Curtiss C-46 HK-851-P, crashed near La Vanguardia Airport after take off, when the engine number 2 failed due to fire. 10 of 19 people on board were killed including the Captain and First Officer. There were 9 survivors.

=== 2010s ===
- 21 April 2012, seven minutes after taking off from Viru – Viru International, Santa Cruz de la Sierra – Bolivia, Curtiss C-46 CP-1319 lost one engine and crashed with the loss of a crew of three and one injured.
- 25 September 2015, Buffalo Airways Flight 525 (a C-46A, C-GTXW) diverted to Déline Airport, Northwest Territories following engine failure and performed an emergency gear-up landing. Although the aircraft was substantially damaged and ultimately written off, all four on board were not injured.
