= List of accidents and incidents involving the Convair CV-240 family =

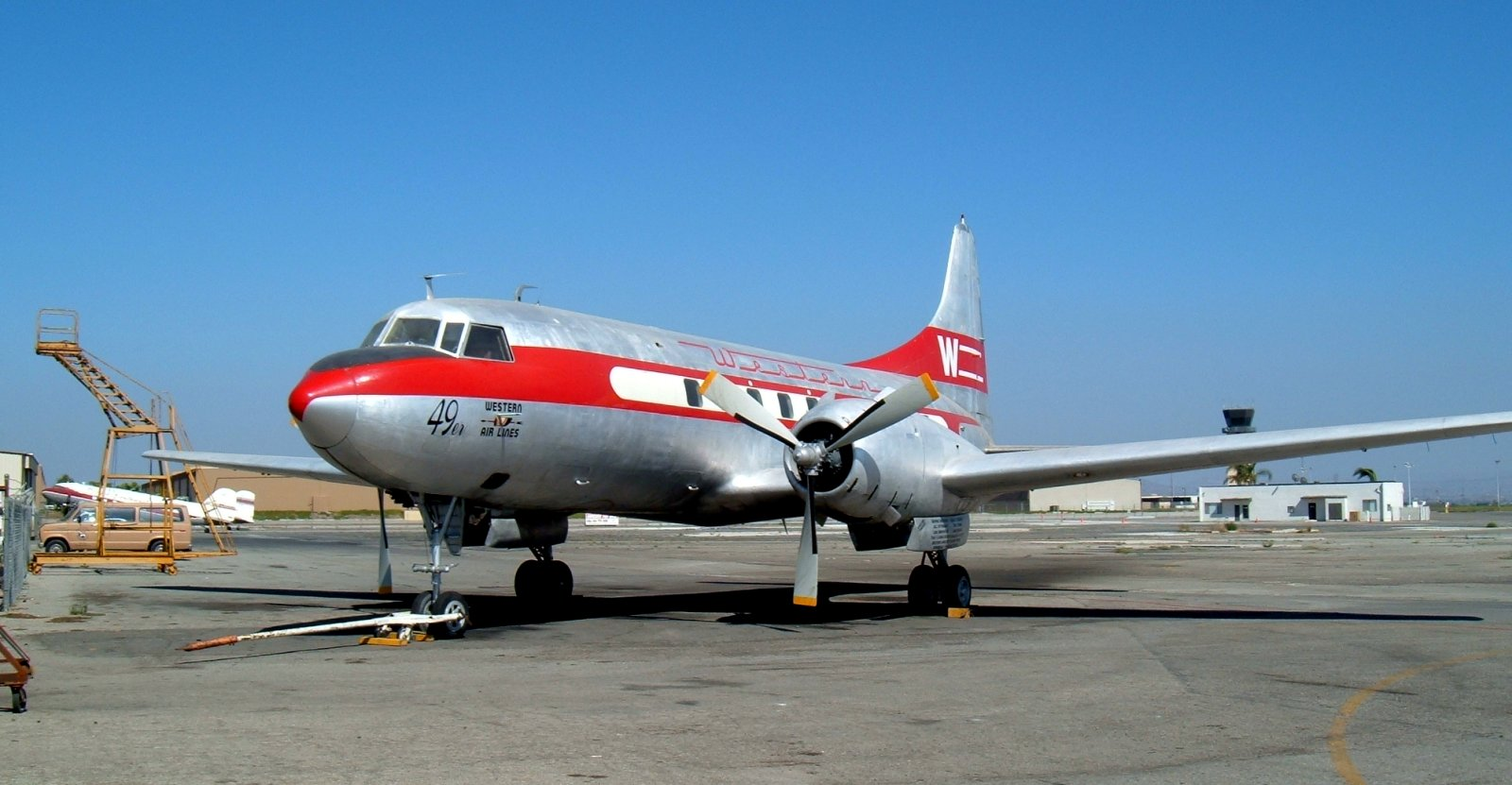
A restored Convair CV-240 in Western Air Lines livery, at the Planes of Fame Museum in Chino, California

The Convair CV-240 is an American airliner produced by Convair from 1947 to 1954, initially as a possible replacement of the ubiquitous Douglas DC-3. Featuring a more modern design, the 240 series was able to make some inroads as a commercial airliner and also had a long development cycle which resulted in a number of civil and military variants. Though reduced in numbers by attrition, the various forms of the "Convairliners" continue to fly into the 21st century.

== Accidents and incidents ==
Like every other major type in long service and operation, accidents and incidents have been recorded that have substantially reduced the numbers flying. The following list is typical of such a record of operational use.

=== Convair CV-240 ===
- January 22, 1952: American Airlines Flight 6780, a CV-240-0, crashed in downtown Elizabeth, New Jersey in the first fatal accident after a record 840,000 safe flying hours. All 23 occupants on board (20 passengers and 3 crew) plus 7 people on the ground were killed in the crash and ensuing fire; because of insufficient evidence, the cause was not determined.
- March 14, 1953: An Orient Airways CV-240-7 (AP-AEG) struck a mountain south of Kalahasahar, India after the pilot descended to ascertain his position in poor visibility, killing all 16 on board.
- May 25, 1953: A KLM CV-240-4 (PH-TEI, Paulus Potter) crashed on the runway at Schiphol Airport due to a loss of control; the aircraft slid off the runway, crossed a road, and ended up in a ditch. Although all 34 passengers and crew on board survived, two people on the road watching the aircraft died when it crossed the road.
- September 16, 1953: American Airlines Flight 723, a CV-240-0, struck radio towers and crashed near Albany, New York. All 28 on board were killed.
- October 14, 1953: A Sabena CV-240-12 (OO-AWQ) crashed near Kelsterbach, Germany due to a loss of engine power, killing all 44 on board in the worst-ever crash involving the CV-240. An investigation blamed heavy deposits of lead on the sparkplugs that cut power to the engines.
- December 19, 1953: A Sabena CV-240-12 (OO-AWO) crashed near Kloten Airport, Switzerland due to pilot error, killing one of 43 on board.
- January 20, 1954: American Airlines Flight 767, a CV-240-0, crashed during takeoff from Buffalo Niagara International Airport. It suffered engine failure and landed 200 yards south of 2478 George Urban Boulevard, Depew, New York. Several injuries were reported but no deaths as the plane failed to gain altitude after the left engine failed. No fire was reported but the presence of fuel made the muddy, shallow swamp a fire hazard. The plane remained mostly intact, coming to rest against a small clump of large trees. The flight was en route to Detroit, Michigan after starting the day in Albany, New York.
- February 26, 1954: Western Air Lines Flight 34, a CV-240-1 (N8407H), crashed 19 mi ENE of Wright, Wyoming due to a loss of control caused by weather and turbulence, killing all nine on board.
- June 19, 1954: A Swissair CV-240-4 ditched in the English Channel near Folkestone due to fuel starvation; all nine on board were able to escape, but three drowned.
- March 20, 1955: American Airlines Flight 711, a CV-240-0, struck the ground during final approach in Springfield, Missouri. Of the 35 people aboard, there were 22 survivors.
- August 4, 1955: American Airlines Flight 476, a CV-240-0 (N94221), crashed near Forney AAF, Missouri due to an engine fire caused by an uncontained engine failure and resultant wing separation, killing all 30 passengers and crew on board.
- January 6, 1957: American Airlines Flight 327, a CV-240-0 (N94247), crashed near Tulsa International Airport due to crew error, killing one of 10 on board.
- July 25, 1957: Saul Binstock, a retired North Hollywood jeweler, committed suicide by detonating a bomb in the rear lavatory of Western Airlines Flight 39, a CV-240-1 (N8406H). Binstock had purchased two insurance policies totaling $125,000. The plane landed safely. Only Binstock was killed.
- May 15, 1958: Pakistan International Airlines Flight 205, a CV-240-7 (AP-AEH), crashed on climbout from Palam Airport due to pilot error, killing 21 of 38 on board and two on the ground.
- August 15, 1958: Northeast Airlines Flight 258, a CV-240-2 (N90670), crashed short of the runway at Nantucket Memorial Airport in poor visibility due to pilot error, killing 25 of 34 on board.
- January 22, 1959: Air Jordan Flight 601, a CV-240-2 (JY-ACB), crashed in a field in Wadi es Sir near Amman, Jordan, killing 10 of 15 on board.
- July 31, 1960: A Deutsche Flugdienst CV-240-4 (D-BELU) crashed short of the runway at Rimini Airport due to double engine failure, killing one of 34 on board.
- February 19, 1961: Vice President Lyndon B. Johnson's CV-240-0 (N92456) crashed in rugged terrain near the LBJ Ranch, killing both pilots.
- May 9, 1962: A Cruzeiro do Sul CV-240-0 (PP-CEZ) on final approach to Vitória struck a tree at a height of 40m, 1,860m short of the runway. It should have been at 150m. Of the 31 passengers and crew aboard, 28 died.
- August 17, 1962: A Garuda Indonesia CV-240-23 (PK-GCE) was written off at Ambon, Indonesia.
- December 22, 1962: A Varig Convair CV-240-2 (PP-VCQ) flying from Rio de Janeiro to Brasília via Belo Horizonte-Pampulha descended below the prescribed altitude while on final approach to Brasília, struck trees, skidded and fell to one side. One crew member died.
- January 15, 1963: Cruzeiro do Sul Flight 403, a CV-240-0 (PP-CEV) on approach to São Paulo-Congonhas, crashed into houses in the neighborhood of Jabaquara after an engine failed. Of the 45 passengers and crew aboard, 6 died. Six persons on the ground were also killed.
- February 27, 1964: Fuji Air Lines Flight 902, a CV-240-0, overran the runway on landing at Oita Airport and crashed in the dried-up Urakawa River, killing 20 of 42 on board.
- January 25, 1970: A CV-240-2 from the Mexican Government carrying journalists crashed into a hill in Poza Rica, killing all but one of the 20 people on board.
- May 14, 1971: A CV-240-14 (N1015G) operated by the U.S. Geological Survey lost power in the right engine during climb from takeoff at Twin Falls, Idaho. The failed engine was not feathered. The aircraft belly landed in a field near Buhl, Idaho and was damaged beyond repair. All three crew members were unhurt.
- October 20, 1977: Six people were killed, including three members of the southern rock band Lynyrd Skynyrd when Convair CV-240 N55VM crashed near a forest in Gillsburg, Mississippi. The probable cause of the crash was fuel exhaustion and total loss of power from both engines. The pilot, co-pilot and the band's assistant road manager were among the dead. Some 20 other passengers survived, some with terrible injuries.
- August 31, 1988: An Aerocaribe CV-240 (XA-HUL, a former T-29B) crashed on takeoff from Merida Airport, killing one of 20 on board.

=== Convair CV-340 ===
- March 16, 1954: Continental Airlines Flight 46, a CV-340-35 (N90853), belly-landed in a field near Midland, Texas, after takeoff due to loss of control caused by improper maintenance; all 11 passengers and crew survived, but the aircraft was written off.
- January 19, 1955: United Air Lines Flight 329, a CV-340 (N73154), suffered a loss of elevator control just after takeoff from Des Moines, Iowa. The aircraft went into a steep climb and nearly stalled; the pilot applied full power but the aircraft entered a steep dive. The pilot reduced power and made an emergency wheels-up landing in a corn field; all 39 on board survived. The cause of the loss of control was traced to maintenance errors.
- July 17, 1955: Braniff International Airways Flight 560, a CV-340-32 (N3422), struck a gas station sign while on final approach to Chicago Midway Airport. The aircraft then crashed through the airport boundary fence and came to rest upside down. A total of 22 of the 43 people on board died.
- October 10, 1955: A JAT Yugoslav Airlines CV-340-58 (YU-ADC) crashed on approach to Schwechat International Airport after descending too low, killing seven of 29 on board.
- December 22, 1956: A JAT Yugoslav Airlines CV-340-58 (YU-ADA) crashed on approach to Riem Airport due to excessive descent, killing three of 30 on board.
- June 24, 1960: Real Transportes Aéreos Flight 435, a CV-340-62 (PP-YRB), crashed into Guanabara Bay. All five crew and 49 passengers were killed. The cause was undetermined.
- May 3, 1963: A Cruzeiro do Sul CV-340-59 registration PP-CDW flying from São Paulo-Congonhas to Rio de Janeiro-Santos Dumont had to return to São Paulo after no. 2 engine caught fire. When on finals to touchdown, the aircraft nosed up 45°, stalled and struck a house. Of the 50 passengers and crew aboard, 37 died.
- December 30, 1964: United Air Lines Flight 593, a CV-340 (N73102), suffered a dual engine failure while descending for landing at LAX. The crew made a deadstick landing into a beet field 40 miles north of LAX. All 47 passengers and crew survived, two with minor injuries. The cause of the accident was traced to improper positioning of fuel cross feed valves.
- July 8, 1968: A Saudia CV-340-68 crashed at Dhahran International Airport after repeated landing attempts due to poor visibility caused by blowing dust, killing all 11 on board.
- July 10, 2018: A Rovos Air CV-340 (in vintage Martin's Air Charter livery) on a local flight crashed on takeoff in Pretoria, South Africa due to possible engine failure leaving two dead (two among 19 occupants) and one on ground. The plane crashed into a dairy farm near the airport. The plane was about to leave for Aviodrome air museum in the Netherlands.
- February 8, 2019: Conquest Air Cargo Flight 504, a CV-340 (N145GT, a former C-131B) carrying two pilots, ditched and broke up in the Atlantic Ocean off Miami after experiencing engine problems en route to Opa-locka from Nassau; the co-pilot was rescued but the pilot remains missing.

=== Convair CV-440 ===
- July 15, 1956: A CV-440-11 (HB-IMD) was being delivered to Swissair when it crashed at Shannon Airport due to pilot error, killing the four crew.
- September 18, 1957: A Real Transportes Aéreos CV-440-62 registration PP-AQE belonging to Transportes Aéreos Nacional, flying from Porto Alegre to Montevideo had an accident during touch down operations in Montevideo. While on a night landing procedure under fog, the aircraft undershot the runway by 1,030m, causing the left and middle gear to hit an earth bank bordering a highway. The right wing touched the ground and further on, the aircraft lost both propellers. The right wing then broke off. One crew member died.
- June 16, 1958: Cruzeiro do Sul, a Convair CV-440-59 registration PP-CEP flying from Florianópolis to Curitiba-Afonso Pena was on final approach procedures to land at Curitiba in bad weather when it was caught in windshears. The aircraft descended and struck the ground. Of the 27 passengers and crew aboard, 24 died.
- October 12, 1962: An Iberia CV-440-62 (EC-ATB), c/n 443, struck a mountain near Carmona while on approach to Seville, killing all 14 passengers and four crew on board.
- November 20, 1964: Linjeflyg Flight 267V, a Convair CV-440, crashed while on approach to Ängelholm after the crew descended too soon, killing 31 of 43 on board in Sweden's deadliest air disaster.
- March 31, 1965: An Iberia CV-440-62 (EC-ATH), c/n 388, stalled and crashed 11 mi off Tangier Airport for reasons unknown, killing 50 of 53 on board.
- January 28, 1966: Lufthansa Flight 005, a CV-440-0, crashed in Bremen, Germany just beyond the runway in a go-around after an aborted landing in low visibility. All 46 passengers and crew on board lost their lives.
- February 10, 1967: A Swissair CV-440-11 (HB-IMF) struck Mount Lägern during a training flight, killing the four crew.
- December 21, 1973: A Transporte Aéreo Militar (TAM) CV-440-62 (TAM-47) struck trees and crashed while on approach to Talara, Peru, killing six of nine on board.
- March 13, 1974: A film crew for Wolper Productions filming a National Geographic history of Australopithecus at Mammoth Mountain Ski Area was killed when Sierra Pacific Airlines Flight 802 crashed into a mountain shortly after takeoff from Eastern Sierra Regional Airport in Bishop, California killing all 36 on board, including 31 Wolper crew members, although not Wolper himself. The filmed segment was recovered in the wreckage and was broadcast in the television show Primal Man. The National Transport Safety Board (US) has never been able to determine the cause of the crash.
- October 27, 1975: A Transporte Aéreo Militar (TAM) CV-440-12 (TAM-44) crashed in the Cerro Colorado mountains after failing to gain height due to overloading, killing all 67 on board in the worst-ever accident involving the Convair 440 and the entire CV-240 family.
- May 20, 1981: An Aero Léon CV-440-11 (XA-HEK) struck Pinarete Mountain en route to Oaxaca from Puerto Escondido, killing all 18 on board.
- August 25, 1982: An Air Resorts CV-440 (N477KW) on a positioning flight flew into a cloud under VFR conditions and crashed into a mountain near Del Norte, Colorado. Two pilots on board were severely injured and the airplane was written off.
- April 20, 1985: A Carga Aéreo Transportada CV-440-35 (CP-1489) nosed down and crashed shortly after takeoff due to loss of control following engine failure, killing all four on board.
- August 21, 1992: A Servicios Aéreos Santa Ana (SASA) CV-440-80 (CP-1961) struck Mount Chacaltaya at 15,000 feet while descending for La Paz, killing all 10 on board.
- February 20, 1993: A Cargo Three Panama CV-440-11 (HP-1200CTH) crashed near Eldorado Airport while attempting to return due to en engine fire, killing both pilots.
- May 22, 1995: A Servicios Aéreos Santa Ana (SASA) CV-440 (CP-2142) crashed at Capitan G.Q. Guardia Airport while attempting to return following engine problems, killing one of four on board.
- June 27, 1995: A Salair CV-440-98F (N356SA) crashed near La Romana while attempting to return to Santo Domingo, killing both pilots.
- February 5, 1996: A Business Air Connection CV-440-72 (N131T, a former C-131E) crashed while attempting to takeoff from Saint John's Municipal Airport, killing all four on board. The aircraft was loaded incorrectly and the pilot was inexperienced in the CV-440.
- July 12, 2004: A Dodita Air Cargo CV-440 (N4826C) ditched 34 mi off Beef Island, British Virgin Islands due to an unexplained in-flight fire, killing the pilot; the co-pilot survived.
- March 15, 2012: A Jet One Express CV-440-38 (N153JR) operating as a cargo flight crashed shortly after takeoff from Luis Muñoz Marín International Airport after reporting a "Type 2 Emergency". Both crew members died in the accident. The crash was in "Laguna La Torrecilla" Carolina, Puerto Rico.
- September 11, 2019: A Barker Aeromotive CV-440 cargo plane (N24DR) crashed at Bubba’s Diesel & Auto Repair in Monclova, Ohio near the Toledo Express Airport at 2:39 A.M. ET. The plane was carrying car parts from Laredo International Airport with a stopover at Millington Regional Jetport. Both pilots have died at the scene. A preliminary NTSB report states that the plane struck multiple trees and crash landed 0.50 mi (0.80 km) short from the runway. No distress calls or aircraft problems were reported from the pilots prior to the accident.

=== Convair CV-580 ===
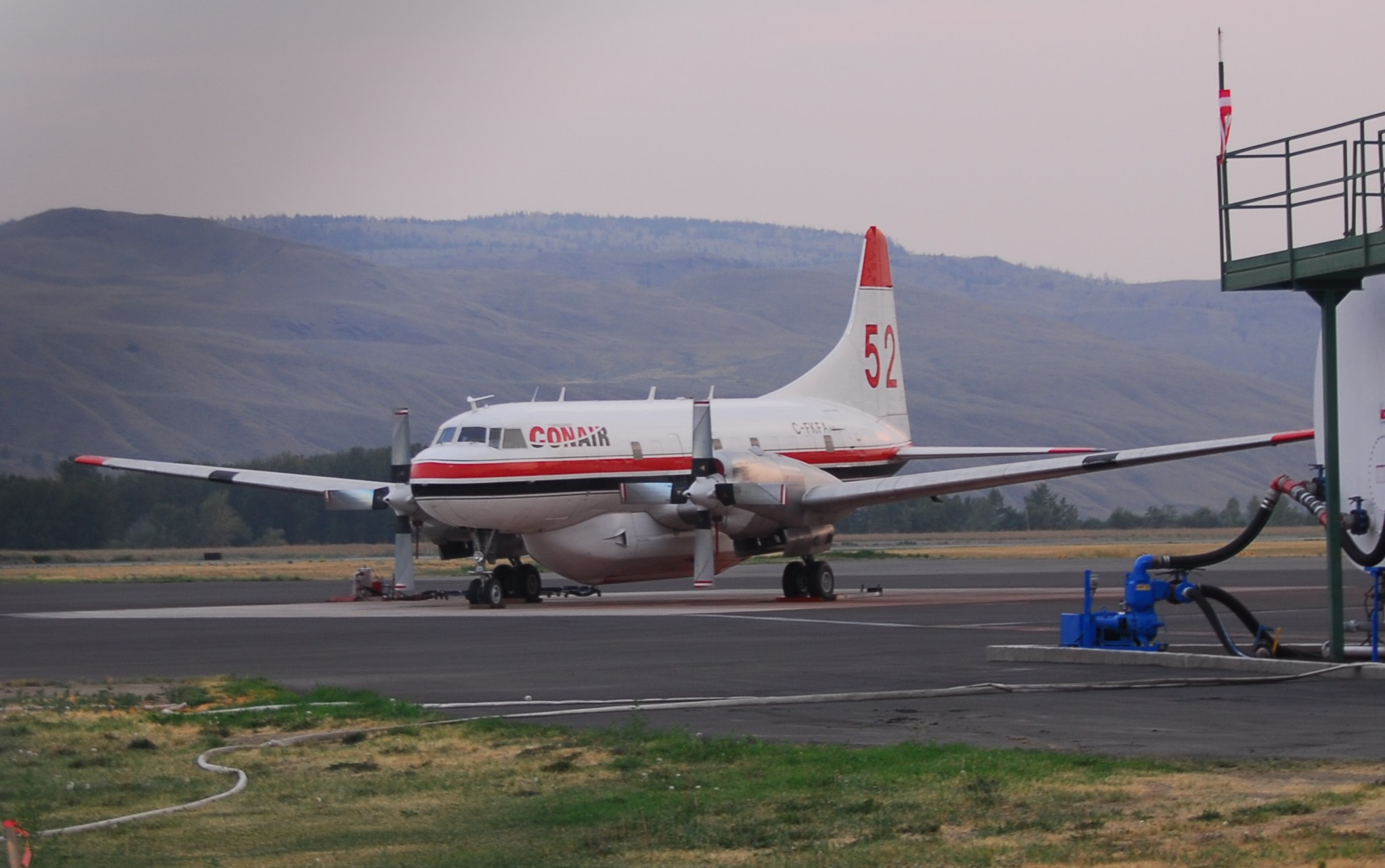
A Conair CV-580 water bomber, similar to the one lost in 2010

- March 5, 1967: Lake Central Airlines Flight 527, a CV-580, crashed near Marseilles, Ohio when a runaway prop disintegrated. All 38 on board were killed. As of May 2026, this remains the deadliest aviation accident in the state of Ohio.
- December 24, 1968: Allegheny Airlines Flight 736, a CV-580, crashed near Bradford, Pennsylvania after the crew allowed the aircraft to descend too low, killing 20 of 47 on board.
- December 27, 1968: North Central Airlines Flight 458, a CV-580, crashed into a hangar at O'Hare International Airport killing 27 of the 45 people on board and killing one and injuring six people on the ground.
- January 6, 1969: Allegheny Airlines Flight 737, a CV-580, crashed near Bradford, Pennsylvania, killing 11 of the 27 people on board. No definitive cause for the crash was established.
- June 7, 1971: Allegheny Airlines Flight 485, a CV-580 converted from a CV-340/440, crashed on approach to Tweed New Haven Airport into three beach cottages on the northern shore of Long Island Sound in East Haven, Connecticut, killing 28 of the 31 people on board. The NTSB determined that the probable cause of the accident was the captain's intentional descent below the prescribed minimum descent altitude under adverse weather conditions.
- June 29, 1972: North Central Airlines Flight 290, a CV-580, collided in mid-air with Air Wisconsin Flight 671, a de Havilland Canada DHC-6 Twin Otter, over Wisconsin's Lake Winnebago. Both aircraft crashed into the lake, killing all 13 on board both aircraft.
- January 9, 1983: Republic Airlines Flight 927, a CV-580-11-A (N8444H), landed at Brainerd, Minnesota, right wing down, veered to the right until the right propeller struck a two to three ft snow bank. The blade separated from the engine and penetrated the cabin, killing one passenger and injuring another. The aircraft was repaired and returned to service.
- July 31, 1989: An Air Freight NZ CV-580 (ZK-FTB), crashed shortly after takeoff from Auckland Airport, New Zealand, colliding with a bank before coming to rest in the Manukau Harbour. Three crew were killed.
- September 8, 1989: Partnair Flight 394, a CV-580 (LN-PAA), crashed into the sea near Hirtshals, Denmark after the tailfin suffered severe vibration due to it being attached to the fuselage with fraudulent bolts; the vibration caused a rudder hard-over. All 55 occupants were killed in the worst-ever accident involving the Convair 580.
- May 19, 1995: A Swiftair CV-580F (EC-899) made a wheels-up landing at Vitoria Airport, Spain during a training flight. All four occupants survived, but the aircraft was damaged beyond repair.
- October 3, 2003: An Air Freight NZ CV-580F (ZK-KFU) after severe icing caused the aircraft to stall and enter a spiral dive, crashed into the sea near Paraparaumu, New Zealand. The aircraft suffered an in-flight breakup. Both pilots were killed.
- August 13, 2004: An Air Tahoma CV-580 (N586P) crashed during approach to landing at Cincinnati/Northern Kentucky International Airport, Covington, Kentucky, killing the first officer. The cause of the crash was fuel starvation as a result of improper fuel cross-feed application.
- September 1, 2008: An Air Tahoma CV-580 freighter (N587X) conducting its first flight following a maintenance "C" Check, crashed in Pickaway County, Ohio, immediately after departure from Columbus's Rickenbacker International Airport. The crew had declared an in flight emergency and was attempting to return to the departure airport. Reports indicate the flight was also being used as a training flight for the first officer. All three occupants – the captain, first officer and a company pilot observer – were killed in the crash or post-crash fire. An NTSB report blamed elevator trim cables reversed during maintenance as the cause of the crash.
- July 31, 2010: A Conair Aviation CV-580, was lost after it crashed into terrain. The crash was in the Jackass Mountain region in southwestern British Columbia, Canada.
- January 18, 2018: An Air Tribe CV-580F (XA-TRB) suffered substantial damage after the landing gear collapsed during an engine run-up test at South Padre International Airport.

=== Convair CV-600 ===
- September 27, 1973: Texas International Airlines Flight 655, a CV-600, crashed into a mountain at night time near Mena, Arkansas, killing all 11 on board in the deadliest (and only fatal) accident involving the Convair 600. A probe blamed the captain for not using all the navigation aids available to him and deviating from the preplanned route.

=== Convair CV-640 ===
- September 17, 1969: Pacific Western Airlines Flight 627, a CV-640 (CF-PWR), crashed near Campbell River Airport after the crew deviated from the approach procedure, killing four of 15 on board in the first fatal accident involving the Convair 640.
- February 9, 1992: A Gambcrest CV-640 (N862FW) crashed near Diouloulou, Senegal after the pilot mistook the lights of a hotel for runway lights, killing 31 of 59 on board in the deadliest accident involving the Convair 640.

=== Convair C-131/T-29 (in military service only) ===
- December 17, 1960: USAF C-131D Samaritan (CV-340) 55-0291 crashed due to fuel contamination shortly after take-off from Munich-Riem Airport downtown Munich, Germany killing all 20 on board as well as 32 on the ground in an accident known as the 1960 Munich Convair 340 crash.
- February 25, 1962: USAF T-29A (CV-240) 49-1931 struck the side of Babcock Peak (15 mi northwest of Durango, Colorado) at 14,000 feet in a snowstorm, killing the three crew; wreckage was found on May 18, 1962.
- February 4, 1963: USAF C-131E (CV-440) 55-4758 force-landed near Ogden AFB following engine problems, killing one of 20 on board.
- January 9, 1975: USAF VT-29D (CV-340) 52-5826, operating under call sign M-32, collided with Cessna 150H N50430, a rented aircraft owned by Cavalier Flyers Inc., at night over the James River off Newport News, Virginia, while the Convair was on an instrument landing system approach to Langley Air Force Base. The collision killed all aboard both aircraft: the Convair's five crew and two passengers and the Cessna's pilot and passenger. The National Transportation Safety Board found the probable cause to be "the human limitation inherent in the see-and-avoid concept, which can be critical in a terminal area with a combination of controlled and uncontrolled traffic", and recommended stricter traffic control procedures for the high-traffic area around Newport News and Langley.
- September 26, 1975: US Navy C-131F (CV-340) 141012 crashed on climbout from El Toro MCAS after a loss of altitude after takeoff, killing four of six on board.
- April 30, 1983: US Navy C-131F (CV-340) 141010 crashed off Jacksonville NAS following an engine fire; of the 15 on board, only a passenger survived.
- November 15, 1985: US Navy VC-131H (CV-580) 542817 crashed on takeoff at Dothan Airport during a test flight after work was completed by a civilian rework facility. Elevator cables were installed incorrectly therefore locking the elevator. Pilot, CoPilot and Flight Engineer were all killed.
