= 1952 Palmeiras de Goias Transportes Aéreos Nacional Douglas C-47 crash =

1952 aviation accident

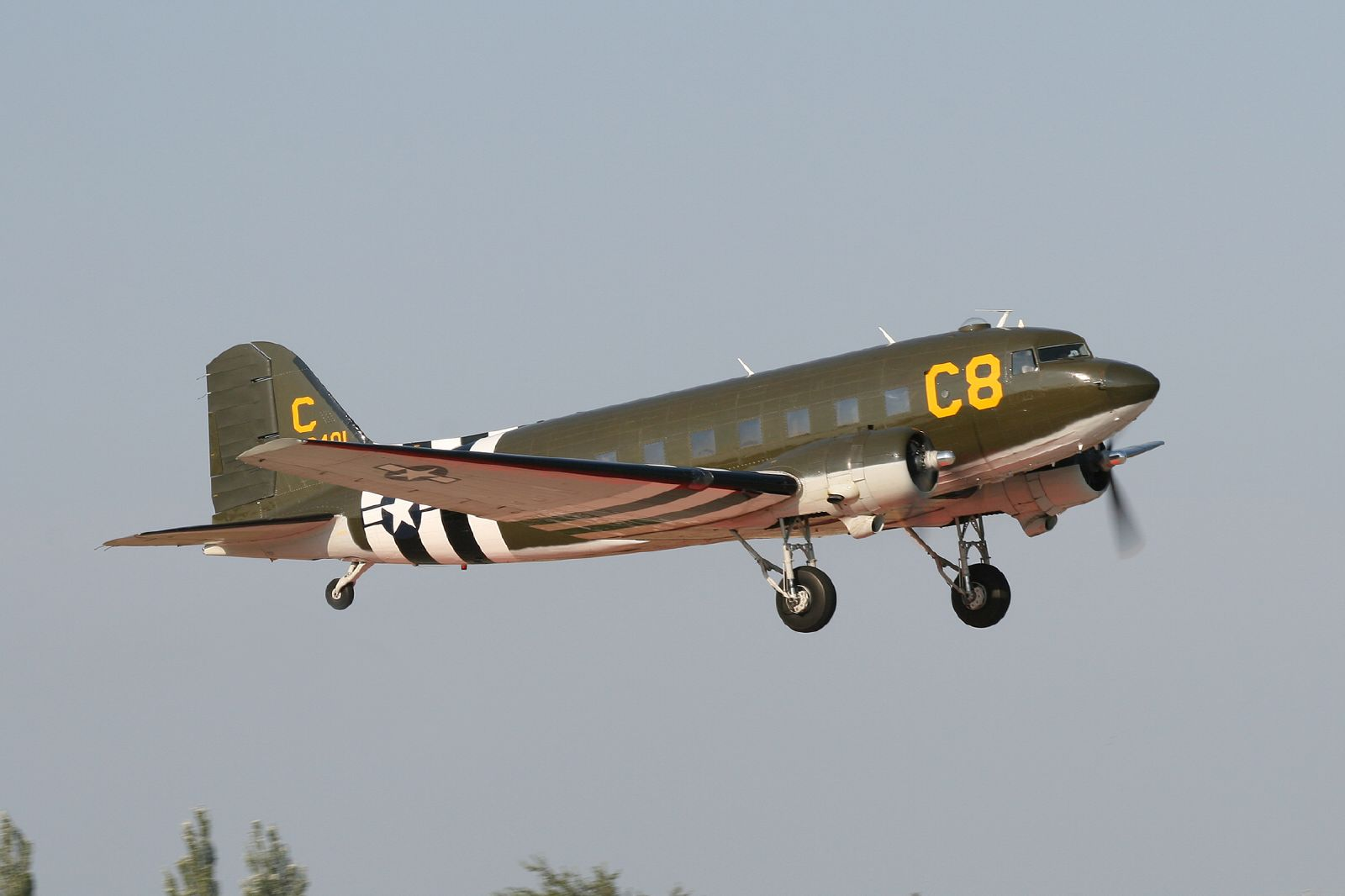
- A Douglas C-47 similar to the accident aircraft

Incident
- Date: August 12, 1952
- Summary: In-flight fire
- Site: Palmeiras de Goias, Brazil

Aircraft
- Aircraft type: Douglas C-47A
- Operator: Transportes Aéreos Nacional
- Registration: PP-ANH
- Flight origin: Rio Verde Airport, Brazil
- Destination: Santa Genoveva Airport, Brazil
- Occupants: 24
- Passengers: 20
- Crew: 4
- Fatalities: 24
- Survivors: 0

The 1952 Transportes Aéreos Nacional Douglas C-47 crash occurred on 12 August 1952 when a Douglas C-47A registered PP-ANH was destroyed after an in-flight fire caused it to crash near Palmeiras de Goiás, Brazil.

The 1944-built C-47 was on a domestic flight from Rio Verde Airport to Goiânia-Santa Genoveva Airport, belonged to Viabras and was operated by Transportes Aéreos Nacional.
