= Viabras =

Brazilian airline

Viação Aérea Brasil
- Founded: 1946
- Commenced operations: 1947
- Ceased operations: 1953
- Key people: Alberto Murtinho; Haroldo Aguinaga; Hilton Machado

Viação Aérea Brasil S/A commonly known by its acronym Viabras was a Brazilian airline founded in 1946. In 1953 it was sold to Transportes Aéreos Nacional.

== History ==
Viação Aérea Brasil – Viabras was founded on April 11, 1946 and on August 16 of the same year it was authorized to start services, which actually started only in March, 1947. It had a fleet of Douglas DC-3 aircraft and operated from Rio de Janeiro to locations in the states of Minas Gerais, Goiás and Mato Grosso. In 1949 Viabras started an operational agreement with Transportes Aéreos Nacional, which purchased the airline in 1953.

== Destinations ==
In 1949 Viabras served the following cities:

- Belo Horizonte
- Cuiabá
- Goiânia
- Rio de Janeiro
- Rio Verde
- Uberlândia

== Fleet ==
Viabras fleet
Aircraft	Total	Years of operation	Notes
Douglas DC-3/C-47	4	1947–1953	

== Accidents and incidents ==
- 12 August 1952: a Douglas DC-3/C-47A-80-DL registration PP-ANH operated by Nacional en route from Rio Verde to Goiânia crashed following an in-flight bomb explosion at the location of Palmeiras de Goiás. All 24 passengers and crew died.

== See also ==
- List of defunct airlines of Brazil
