= Linha Aérea Transcontinental Brasileira =

Brazilian airline

- Founded: 1944
- Commenced operations: 1946
- Ceased operations: 1951
- Key people: Dulcídio Cardoso

Linha Aérea Transcontinental Brasileira S.A. was a Brazilian airline formed in 1944 and that started scheduled flights in 1946. In 1951 it was sold to Real Transportes Aéreos, which incorporated the airline the following year.

== History ==
Linha Aérea Transcontinental Brasileira was formed on July 22, 1944 with a fleet of five Avro Ansons. Some experimental flights were made in 1945 but only on February 1, 1946 scheduled flights began.

In October 1948 Transcontinental started and operational agreement with VASD, being the first case of an operational agreement between Brazilian airlines. In 1949 a third route was created, between Rio de Janeiro and Fortaleza.

In 1951 Transcontinental was sold to and incorporated by Real Transportes Aéreos.

== Destinations ==
In 1948 Transcontinental was flying between Rio de Janeiro and São Paulo, and Rio de Janeiro and Recife via the coast. In 1949 a third route was created, between Rio de Janeiro and Fortaleza.

== Fleet ==
Transcontinental Fleet
Aircraft	Total	Years of operation	Notes
Avro Anson Mk. II	5	1945–1946	
Douglas DC-3/C-47	4	1946–1953	
Beechcraft Model 18 S	1	1947–1951	
Curtiss C-46/Super C-46 Commando	1	1949–1950	

== Accidents and incidents ==
- 6 June 1951: a Douglas DC-3 D registration PP-NAL struck high ground while flying below minimums during approach to Rio de Janeiro. One crew member and one passenger died.

== See also ==
- List of defunct airlines of Brazil
