= Viação Aérea Santos Dumont =

Brazilian airline

- Founded: 1944
- Ceased operations: 1952
- Headquarters: Rio de Janeiro, Brazil
- Key people: Eduardo Eugênio Dahne; Dulcídio do Espírito Santo Cardoso

Viação Aérea Santos Dumont, or VASD, was a Brazilian airline founded in 1944. It was bought by and merged into Transportes Aéreos Nacional in 1952.

== History ==
Viação Aérea Santos Dumont was founded on January 18, 1944 and in the beginning of 1945 it started regular operations between Rio de Janeiro and Fortaleza to the north and Porto Alegre to the south, always via the coast with intermediate stops and using aircraft bought from the Rubber Development Corporation located in Belém. On January 4, 1946, its Budd Conestoga made an emergency landing at Afonsos Air Force Base which led to a complete loss of the aircraft. Days later, the airline was grounded.

On October 1, 1948, following an operational agreement with Linha Aérea Transcontinental Brasileira which had the same owner, and with new board of directors, VASD started operations once again. This operational agreement was the first of its kind in Brazil. In 1952 it was bought and merged into Transportes Aéreos Nacional.

== Fleet ==
VASD fleet
Aircraft	Total	Years of operation	Notes
Consolidated PBY-5 Catalina	2	1945–1947	
Budd RB1 Conestoga	1	1945–1947	
Douglas DC-3/C-47	2	1947–1953	

== See also ==
- List of defunct airlines of Brazil
