= Central Aérea Limitada =

Brazilian airline

- Founded: 1948
- Commenced operations: 1948
- Ceased operations: 1955
- Headquarters: Belo Horizonte, Brazil
- Key people: Joaquim Montenegro; Ricardo Henriques

Central Aérea Limitada was a Brazilian airline founded in 1948. In 1950 Central established a technical and operational partnership with Transportes Aéreos Nacional. Finally, in 1955 Central was sold to and incorporated by Nacional.

== History ==
Central received its operational authorization on March 29, 1948 and flights started on June 11 of the same year. Its network linked Belo Horizonte to Rio de Janeiro and São Paulo, and cities in the state of São Paulo, and present states of Goiás, Mato Grosso and Mato Grosso do Sul. On August 26, 1950 Central established a technical-operational partnership with Transportes Aéreos Nacional but remained independent. However, in January 1955 Nacional bought all the shares of Central and incorporated the airline.

== Destinations ==
In 1950 Central served the following cities:

- Belo Horizonte
- Rio de Janeiro
- São Paulo

and cities in the state of São Paulo, and in the present states of Goiás, Mato Grosso and Mato Grosso do Sul

== Fleet ==
Central Aérea Limitada fleet
Aircraft	Total	Years of operation	Notes
Douglas DC-3/C-47	3	1948–1955	

== See also ==
- List of defunct airlines of Brazil
