= Organização Mineira de Transportes Aéreos =

Brazilian airline

Organização Mineira de Transportes Aéreos – OMTA
- Founded: 1946
- Commenced operations: 1946
- Ceased operations: 1957
- Headquarters: Belo Horizonte, Brazil

Organização Mineira de Transportes Aéreos – OMTA was a Brazilian airline founded in 1946. In 1950 it was sold to Transportes Aéreos Nacional, which eventually incorporated the airline in 1957.

== History ==
OMTA began its operations on January 28, 1946 as an air charter company, the first of its kind in Brazil. Later OMTA also operated some scheduled flights. On July 20, 1950 it was bought by Transportes Aéreos Nacional. OMTA operated as an autonomous unity for sometime but eventually in 1957 it was absorbed by Nacional.

== Fleet ==
OMTA fleet
Aircraft	Total	Years of operation	Notes
De Havilland Dragon Rapide DH 89A	3	1946 – 1948	
Beechcraft Bonanza 35	20	1947 – 1957	
Nord 1203 Norécrin II	1	1953 – 1956	
