= Linhas Aéreas Natal =

Brazilian airline

- Founded: 1946
- Ceased operations: 1950
- Headquarters: Juiz de Fora, Brazil
- Key people: Júlio Álvares de Assis

Linhas Aéreas Natal S.A. was a Brazilian airline formed in 1946. In 1950 it was sold to Real Transportes Aéreos.

== History ==
Linhas Aéreas Natal was founded in Juiz de Fora on June 3, 1946 and received authorization to operate on June 30, 1946. It was formed by the businessman Júlio Álvares de Assis with money borrowed from his uncle Theodorico Álvares de Assis. In fact, the name Natal was an acronym of Navegação Aérea Theodorico Álvares. Later, the official name was changed to Navegação Aérea Transamericana Ltda. Services started on December 7, 1946 with four Douglas DC-3 linking São Paulo to Rio de Janeiro and to Campo Grande.

In May 1950 the airline was bought by Real Transportes Aéreos, which by the end of the same year completely absorbed Natal.

== Destinations ==
In 1946 Natal served São Paulo, Rio de Janeiro and Campo Grande.

== Fleet ==
Linhas Aéreas Natal fleet
Aircraft	Total	Years of operation	Notes
Douglas DC-3/C-47	4	1946–1950	

== See also ==
- List of defunct airlines of Brazil
