= 1992 Cap Skirring CV-640 crash =

1992 Senegalese aviation incident

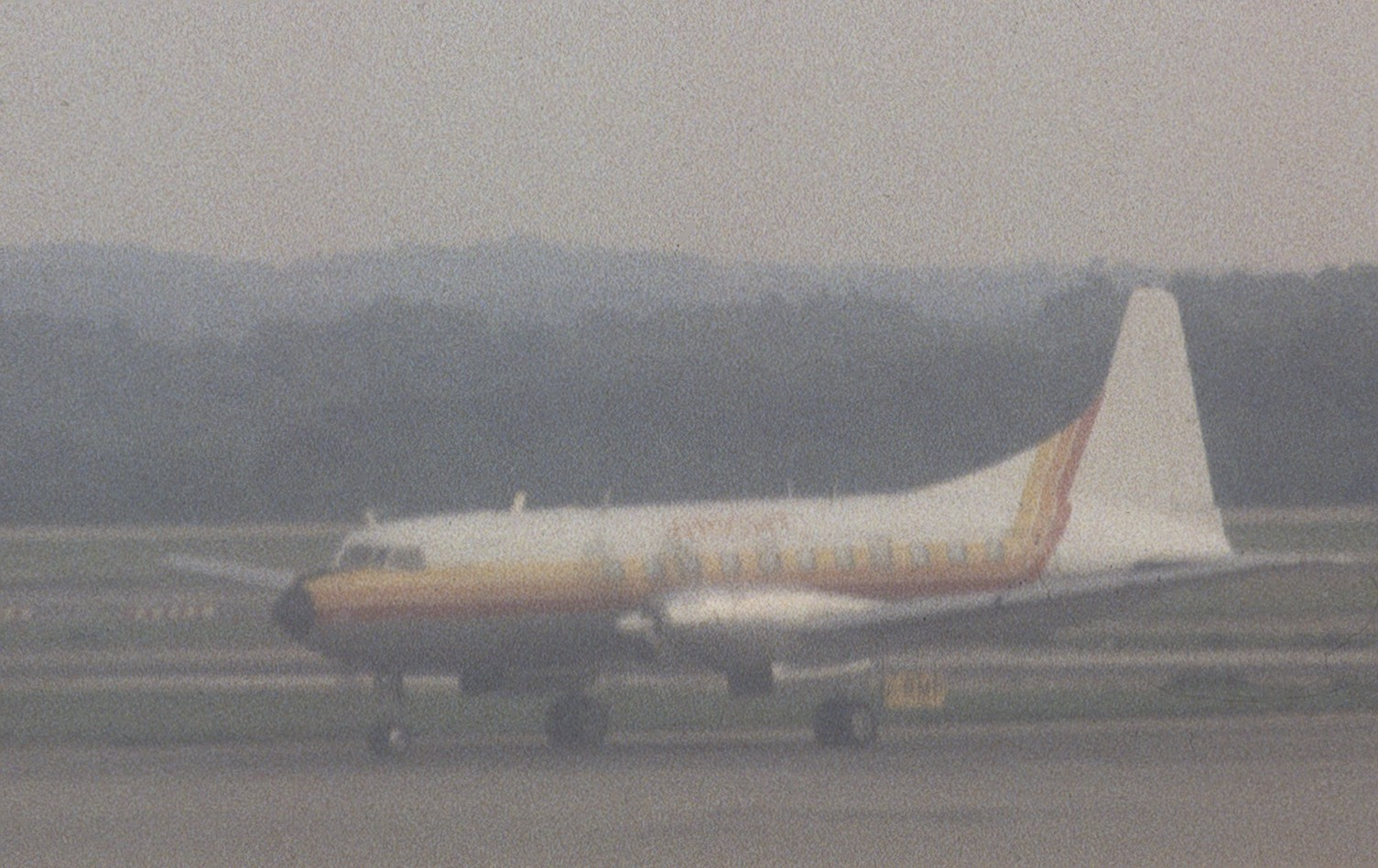
- The aircraft involved while in service with Wright Airlines in 1984

Occurrence
- Date: February 9, 1992
- Summary: Controlled flight into terrain
- Site: Diouloulou, Senegal

Aircraft
- Aircraft type: Convair CV-640
- Operator: Gambcrest Enterprises
- Registration: N862FW
- Flight origin: Blaise Diagne International Airport, Senegal
- Destination: Cap Skirring Airport, Senegal
- Occupants: 59
- Passengers: 53
- Crew: 6
- Fatalities: 31
- Survivors: 28

On 9 February, 1992, a Convair CV-640 operated by Gambcrest Enterprises crashed into a hotel in Dakar, killing 31 people on board. The crash is the second deadliest in Senegal behind Air France Flight 343. This is also the deadliest aircraft accident to involve the Convair CV-640.

== Flight ==
When boarding the flight passengers described the flight as a "cattle truck" with the seats being wrecked, the club initially only had contracts with Air Senegal.

The flight would take place on 9 February 1992 when Club Med tourists would board a flight chartered by Air Senegal on behalf of Club Med. Most of the people onboard were French except for two Belgians and the crew members.

The flight would take off at around 4:30 am from Dakar heading to Cap Skirring, the copilot on the flight was deaf and nearsighted and was grounded in the United States. The captain an alcoholic and was 67 years old.

The aircraft would crash into a marshy area killing 31 people in the village of Kafountine which was around 52 kilometers North of Cap Skirring.

== Fatalities ==
The fatality count was initially lower as two of the fatalities were not accounted for, officials later sent out a Boeing 737 to bring injured passengers to France.

== Investigation ==
As the aircraft was preparing for its final approach, the pilots mistook the hotel lights for the runway and lined up with the hotel instead of the runway. The crew were also not familiar with the region with the crew consisting of an American, a Norwegian, and a Russian. As a result of this, the aircraft ended up crashing 52 kilometers from its destination.

The airline was also scrutinized as the aircraft was illegally operated by the company with no registration process done to the aircraft, thus making the aircraft unsuitable to fly. The trials also investigation that Gambcrest was going through major financial problems at the time of the accident. It was later confirmed that the pilots were at fault of the accident along with malfunctioning equipment.

== Trials ==
On 6 July 2000 a French court convicted the founder of Club Med and his son of involuntary manslaughter handing down two suspended charges. Later, it was argued that Club Med should not have been held accountable as they would not have known about the condition of the aircraft.

== See also ==
- List of accidents and incidents involving the Convair CV-240 family
- List of defunct airlines of the Gambia
