= Associated Air Transport Flight 1-6-6A =

1953 aviation accident

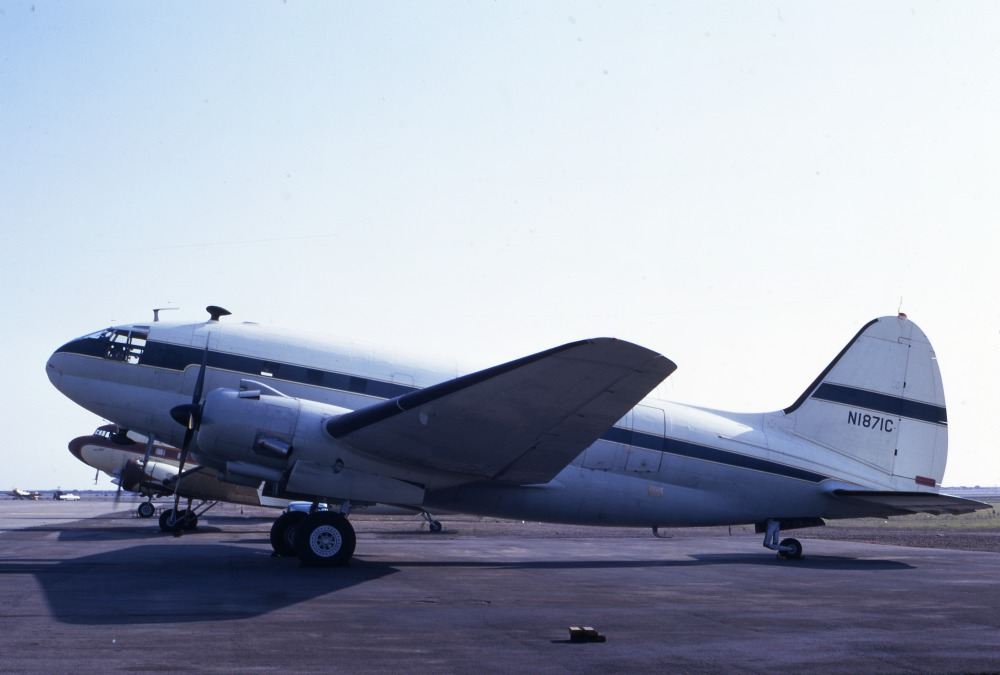
- A Curtiss C-46F Commando, similar to the aircraft involved in the accident.

Accident
- Date: 7 January 1953
- Summary: Uncontrolled flight into terrain after icing
- Site: Fish Haven, Idaho, United States

Aircraft
- Aircraft type: Curtiss C-46F Commando
- Operator: Associated Air Transport
- Registration: N1648M
- Flight origin: King County International Airport (Boeing Field), WA
- Stopover: Cheyenne Airport, WY
- Destination: Fort Jackson, SC
- Occupants: 40
- Passengers: 37
- Crew: 3
- Fatalities: 40
- Survivors: 0

On January 7, 1953, a Curtiss C-46F Commando operating as Associated Air Transport Flight 1-6-6A, returning soldiers home from Korea, crashed into terrain approximately 8 miles west of Fish Haven, Idaho, killing all 40 people on board. The plane had descended into an area of severe icing, causing ice to form on the wing, eventually crashing into the bottom of a ravine.

An oddity of the accident was that the US military arranged for many aircraft to return a large group of soldiers home and boarded them in alphabetic order. All soldiers on this flight thus had last names beginning with the letters H, J and K.

== Accident ==
The flight departed Boeing Field at 12:50 AM MST, and proceeded en route to Cheyenne Airport. It was carrying 37 U.S. soldiers participating in the Korean War who were returning home to Fort Jackson in South Carolina. The flight was completely routine through 3:58 AM MST when the aircraft reported passing over Malad City at 13,000 ft, and estimated that it would reach Rock Springs at 4:45 AM. No further communications were received from the accident aircraft. The aircraft was later found to have impacted several pine trees at about 8,500 ft, slid down a ravine, and collided with the base of a hill on the other side of the ravine.

== Airline ==
Associated Air Transport was a small irregular air carrier founded in 1947 by aviation pioneer Charles F. Blair Jr.. By the time of the crash the airline had passed into other hands and was, at the time, based in San Antonio, Texas with a fleet that comprised two C-46 aircraft.

== Aircraft ==
Curtiss C-46F MSN 22395, registration N1648M was leased from the United States Air Force and had previously been operated by Seaboard and Western and Skyways International. It had first flown in 1945, and at the time of the accident, the aircraft had 1941 airframe hours.

== Investigation ==
The investigation was significantly hampered by deep snow. It took five days to find the crash; USAF paramedics immediately parachuted onto the site, confirming the identity of the aircraft and lack of surviviors. The full accident team arrived at the location over the next two days. The military guarded the site until the investigation was complete in June.

The aircraft, crew and airline were all determined to be properly certificated and the crew had sufficient rest time before the flight. No problems were identified with the maintenance condition of the aircraft, nor was there any evidence of fire. The aircraft did depart Seattle about 400 lbs over its 45,000lb maximum permitted takeoff weight but by the time of the crash it was several thousand pounds below the maximum due to fuel consumption. The crew had also been properly briefed about forecast en-route weather conditions.

The aircraft crashed into terrain at about 8,500 ft, despite being cleared to fly at 13,000 ft. The investigation determined that, while flying near the mountains in between Malad City and Bear Lake, the aircraft inadvertently entered an area of ice and turbulence. The board was unable to determine why the crew did not request a higher altitude. Ice formed on the wings, leading to a decrease in aircraft performance, descent and, ultimately, the crash at 8,500 ft.

== Causes ==
The investigators determined that the aircraft experienced severe turbulence and wing icing, which led to the aircraft's crash. However, the investigators were unable to determine the reason for the aircraft's descent into severe turbulence and icing conditions.
