= Companhia Itaú de Transportes Aéreos =

Brazilian airline, 1948–1956

- Founded: 1947
- Commenced operations: 1948
- Ceased operations: 1956
- Parent company: Companhia de cimento Portland Itaú
- Headquarters: São Paulo, Brazil

Companhia Itaú de Transportes Aéreos was a Brazilian airline founded in 1947. In 1955 it was sold to Transportes Aéreos Nacional, which incorporated the airline the following year.

== History ==
Itaú was founded on September 30, 1947 as a subsidiary of the producer of cement Itaú and dedicated exclusively to the transportation of cargo. Operations started in 1948. In October 1955, suffering from the losses of some aircraft due to accidents, Itaú was sold to Transportes Aéreos Nacional. In 1956 Nacional incorporated the airline.

== Destinations ==
In 1950 Itaú served the following cities:

- Belo Horizonte
- Campo Grande
- Fortaleza
- Recife
- Rio de Janeiro
- Salvador da Bahia
- São Paulo

== Fleet ==
Itaú fleet
Aircraft	Total	Years of operation	Notes
Curtiss-Wright C-46 Commando	12	1948 – 1956	
Consolidated PBY-5A Catalina	1	1955 – 1956	

== Accidents and incidents ==
- 20 August 1953: a Curtiss C-46A-60-CK Commando registration PP-ITD crashed and caught fire during an emergency landing at Corumbá. Three crew members died and one survived.
- 3 April 1955: a Curtiss C-46A-60-CK Commando registration PP-ITG struck a hill 2 miles short of the runway while on an instrument approach to Vitória. The crew of 3 died.

== See also ==
- List of defunct airlines of Brazil
