= 2010 Conair Aviation Convair CV-580 crash =

Aviation accident in Canada

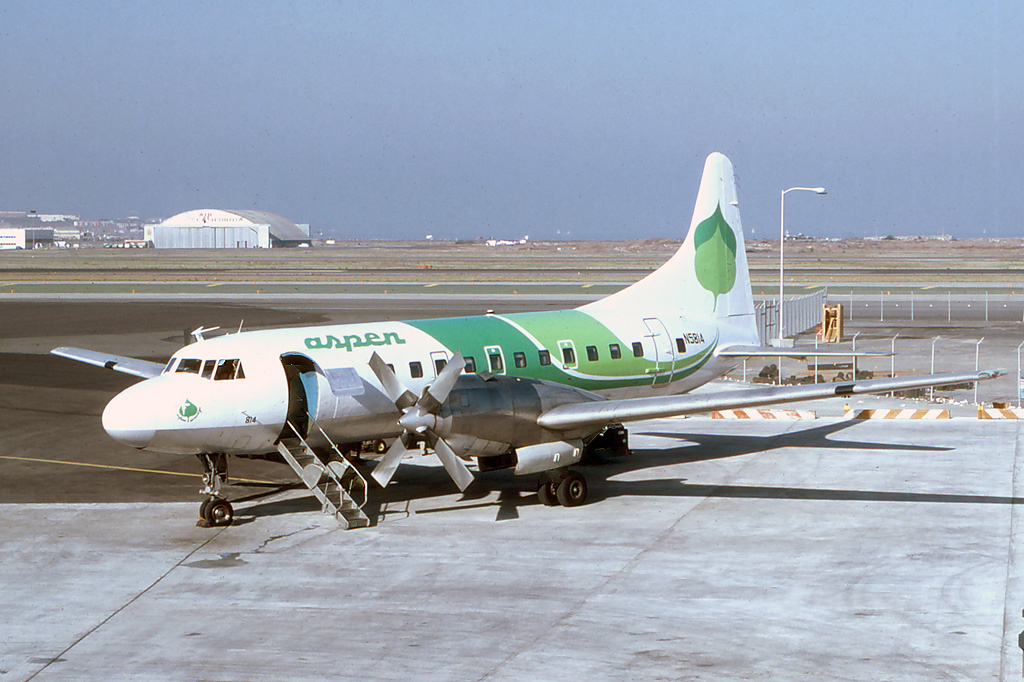
- The CV-580 involved, photographed in 1979 while in service with Aspen Airways

Accident
- Date: 31 July 2010
- Summary: Collision with trees, low altitude stall-spin
- Site: Approx. 17 km SE of Lytton, British Columbia, Canada; 50.094°N 121.533°W

Aircraft
- Aircraft type: Convair CV-580 Airtanker
- Operator: Conair Aviation
- Call sign: TANKER 448
- Registration: C-FKFY
- Flight origin: Kamloops Airport, Kamloops, British Columbia, Canada
- Destination: Kamloops Airport
- Occupants: 2
- Crew: 2
- Fatalities: 2
- Survivors: 0

On 31 July 2010, a Convair CV-580 Airtanker aircraft operated by Conair Aviation crashed while on a firefighting mission near Lytton, British Columbia, Canada. Both crew members, the only people on board, were killed.

The following investigation found no evidence of mechanical faults and concluded that visual illusion during low-altitude flying may have prevented the pilot from accurately assessing the flight path in sufficient time to avoid trees and rising terrain.

== History of the flight ==
The aerial fire-fighting operation involved two aircraft: a Rockwell Turbo Commander 690 acting as bird dog (observation) aircraft, and the accident aircraft, operating as Tanker 448. The bird dog aircraft directed the tanker aircraft to the area where the fire retardant was to be released. On 31 July 2010 both aircraft took off from Kamloops Airport and proceeded to the wildfire.

While preparing for a bombing run on the side of Fraser River canyon, Tanker 448 struck trees while unexpectedly dropping the retardant intended for the target. Seconds later, it entered a spin and crashed into a ravine. A post-impact fire broke out and consumed much of the wreckage. Both crew members were fatally injured.

== Aircraft and crew ==
The aircraft was a twin-turboprop Convair CV-580 Airtanker, serial number 129, registered C-FKFY, manufactured in 1953. It was equipped with a fire retardant tank and other standard equipment, but did not carry a cockpit voice recorder, flight data recorder, or a stall warning device.

The two crew members were 58-year-old Captain Tim Whiting and 36-year-old First Officer Brian Tilley with 17,000 and 5,200 flying hours respectively. Whiting had 3,500 hours in fire suppression experience, while Tilley only had 26 hours.

== Aftermath ==
The aircraft crashed in a ravine roughly 17 km (11 mi) from Lytton, British Columbia, hitting tree tops before coming to a stop in the ravine. The impact started another fire, adding to the already large number of wildfires. The rescue operation to reach the downed flight was carried out by the British Columbia Ministry of Forest and Lands and local emergency services. The location of the crash site was pinpointed by the bird dog aircraft, allowing crews to reach the site more quickly. First responders were slowed reaching the crash site by steep terrain and the ongoing wildfire.

== Investigation ==
The investigation of the accident was carried out by the Transportation Safety Board of Canada (TSB), and was concluded in April 2012 with the publication of the final accident report. No evidence of mechanical failure emerged. The TSB determined that "visual illusion may have precluded recognition, or an accurate assessment, of the flight path profile in sufficient time to avoid the trees on rising terrain."

It was not possible to establish whether the initial impact with trees had damaged the aircraft to the extent that its controllability was affected. It was nevertheless determined that the aircraft "entered an aerodynamic stall and spin from which recovery was not possible at such a low altitude."
