= Transportes Aéreos Nacional =

Brazilian airline, 1946–1961

- Founded: 1946
- Ceased operations: 1961
- Headquarters: Belo Horizonte, Brazil
- Key people: Hilton Machado, Manoel José Antunes, Linneu Gomes

Transportes Aéreos Nacional was a Brazilian airline founded in 1946. It was merged into Varig in 1961, when Varig bought the Consórcio Real-Aerovias-Nacional, of which Transportes Aéreos Nacional was one of the partners.

== History ==
Transportes Aéreos Nacional was founded in 1946 by Hilton Machado, former pilot of Serviços Aéreos Cruzeiro do Sul and Manuel José Antunes, former co-pilot of Aerovias Brasil and other two share-holders. It was authorized to function on February 26, 1947, and the first regular flights took off in 1948, from Belo Horizonte, the headquarters of the airline, to Rio de Janeiro, Salvador and Cuiabá using its first two Douglas DC-3/C-47. After two years of activities, São Paulo was included in the network and the fleet increased to 6 Douglas C-47.

Between 1949 and 1955 Nacional successively purchased and incorporated the smaller airlines Viabras, OMTA, Central Aérea, VASD, and Itaú. All the airlines were operated in the form of a consortium, which took the name of Consórcio de Transportes Aéreos. This consortium was organized as one company of limited responsibility on November 20, 1953 maintaining the name of Nacional.

Those acquisitions greatly increased the number of cities served to 74 in 1954 and its frequencies, using 28 aircraft. It also had an international service to Asunción. However, being the fleet based on Douglas DC-3/C-47 and Curtiss C-46 Commando, Nacional was unable to fly longer sectors without stops.

On August 2, 1956, Linneu Gomes, the owner of Real Transportes Aéreos purchased 85% of the shares of Transportes Aéreos Nacionais and added the airline to a Consortium formed by Real Transportes Aéreos and Aerovias Brasil. The consortium took the name of Consórcio Real-Aerovias-Nacional. The powerful group was able to then fly to the entire Brazilian territory and some international destinations. Though maintaining legal independent identities, because they were controlled by the same person, Linneu Gomes, the three airlines operated jointly and in practice it was Real which controlled the consortium. In its time, the Consortium dominated the passenger traffic on the triangle São Paulo, Rio de Janeiro, Belo Horizonte, the economic center of the country.

In 1961 the three airlines of the consortium Real-Aerovias-Nacional were purchased by and merged into Varig.

== Fleet ==
Transportes Aéreos Nacional fleet
Aircraft	Total	Years of operation
Douglas DC-3/C-47	31	1947–1961
Curtiss C-46 Commando	10	1956–1961
Convair 440	5	1957–1961

== Accidents and incidents ==
Accidents involving fatalities

- 12 August 1952: a Douglas DC-3/C-47A-80-DL registration PP-ANH belonging to Viabras en route from Rio Verde to Goiânia crashed following an in-flight bomb explosion at the location of Palmeiras de Goiás Goiás. All 24 passengers and crew died.
- 31 May 1954: a Douglas DC-3/C-47A-80-DL registration PP-ANO en route from Governador Valadares to Belo Horizonte-Pampulha strayed off course and struck Mount Cipó in cloudy conditions. All 19 passengers and crew died.
- 10 April 1957: a Douglas DC-3/C-47 registration PP-ANX operated by Real Transportes Aéreos en route from Rio de Janeiro-Santos Dumont to São Paulo-Congonhas crashed into a mountain over the location of Ubatuba. The no. 2 engine caught fire, which forced the crew to make an emergency descent for Ubatuba. Due to rain, the crew noticed Papagaio Peak on Anchieta Island too late. The aircraft stalled during the evasive manoeuvre and crashed into the mountain. Of the 30 passengers and crew aboard, 27 died.
- 18 September 1957: a Convair 440-62 registration PP-AQE operated by Real Transportes Aéreos, flying from São Paulo to Porto Alegre to Montevideo to Buenos Aires had an accident during touch down operations in Montevideo. While on a night landing procedure under fog, the aircraft undershoot the runway by 1,030m, causing the left and middle gear to hit an earth bank bordering a highway. The right wing touched the ground and further on the aircraft lost both propellers. The right wing then broke off. One crew member died.
- 7 December 1960: a Curtiss C-46A-60-CK Commando registration PP-AKF operated by Real Transportes Aéreos operating flight 570 from Cuiabá to Manaus-Ponta Pelada crashed near on Cachimbo mountains. The engine no.2 failed during the flight. Altitude was lost, the pilot jettisoned some of the cargo but the aircraft continued to lose height. It crashed and caught fire. 15 passengers and crew died.

== See also ==
- Aerovias Brasil, a partner of the consortium Real-Aerovias-Nacional
- Real Transportes Aéreos, a partner of the consortium Real-Aerovias-Nacional
- List of defunct airlines of Brazil

== Bibliography ==
- Instituto Histórico-Cultural da Aeronáutica (2005). História Geral da Aeronáutica Brasileira: de janeiro de 1946 a janeiro de 1956 após o término da Segunda Guerra Mundial até a posse do Dr. Juscelino Kubitschek como Presidente da República (in Portuguese). Vol. 4. Rio de Janeiro: GR3 Comunicação & Design. pp. 349–350.
