= Real Transportes Aéreos Flight 435 =

1960 aviation incident in Brazil

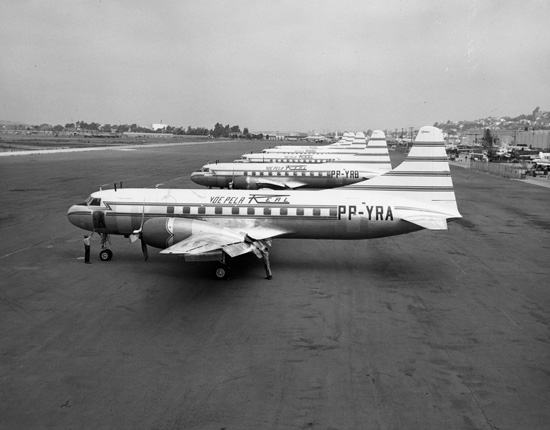
- PP-YRB, the aircraft involved in the accident (behind the first aircraft)

Accident
- Date: June 24, 1960
- Site: Ilha dos Ferros, Baía de Guanabara, Rio de Janeiro, Brazil; 22.7986086°S 43.1235004°W

Aircraft
- Aircraft type: Convair 340
- Operator: Real Transportes Aéreos
- Registration: PP-YRB
- Flight origin: Aeroporto da Pampulha, Belo Horizonte, Minas Gerais
- Destination: Aeroporto Santos Dumont, Rio de Janeiro
- Occupants: 54
- Passengers: 49
- Crew: 5
- Fatalities: 54
- Survivors: 0

REAL Transportes Aéreos Flight 435 was a passenger flight from Belo Horizonte to Rio de Janeiro. On 24 June 1960, the plane crashed into the waters of Baía de Guanabara near Ilha dos Ferro, killing all 54 on board. It was the deadliest plane crash in Brazil up to date.

== Accident ==
The weather at Galeão Airport was deteriorating with heavy rain and foggy conditions, preventing the first approach. During its second approach, the plane lost control while turning and crashed.

== Searching ==
After the Convair 340 disappeared from radar screens, a search was initiated by the Search and Rescue Service of the Força Aérea Brasileira and various public and private boats. Part of the Convair wreckage was located by a Guanabara state boat at 1:15 am on June 25. Only a few bodies could be identified due to the violence of the crash, which suggested the hypothesis of an explosion on board. However, examinations of the wreckage did not reveal any traces of fire or explosion on board.

== Investigation ==
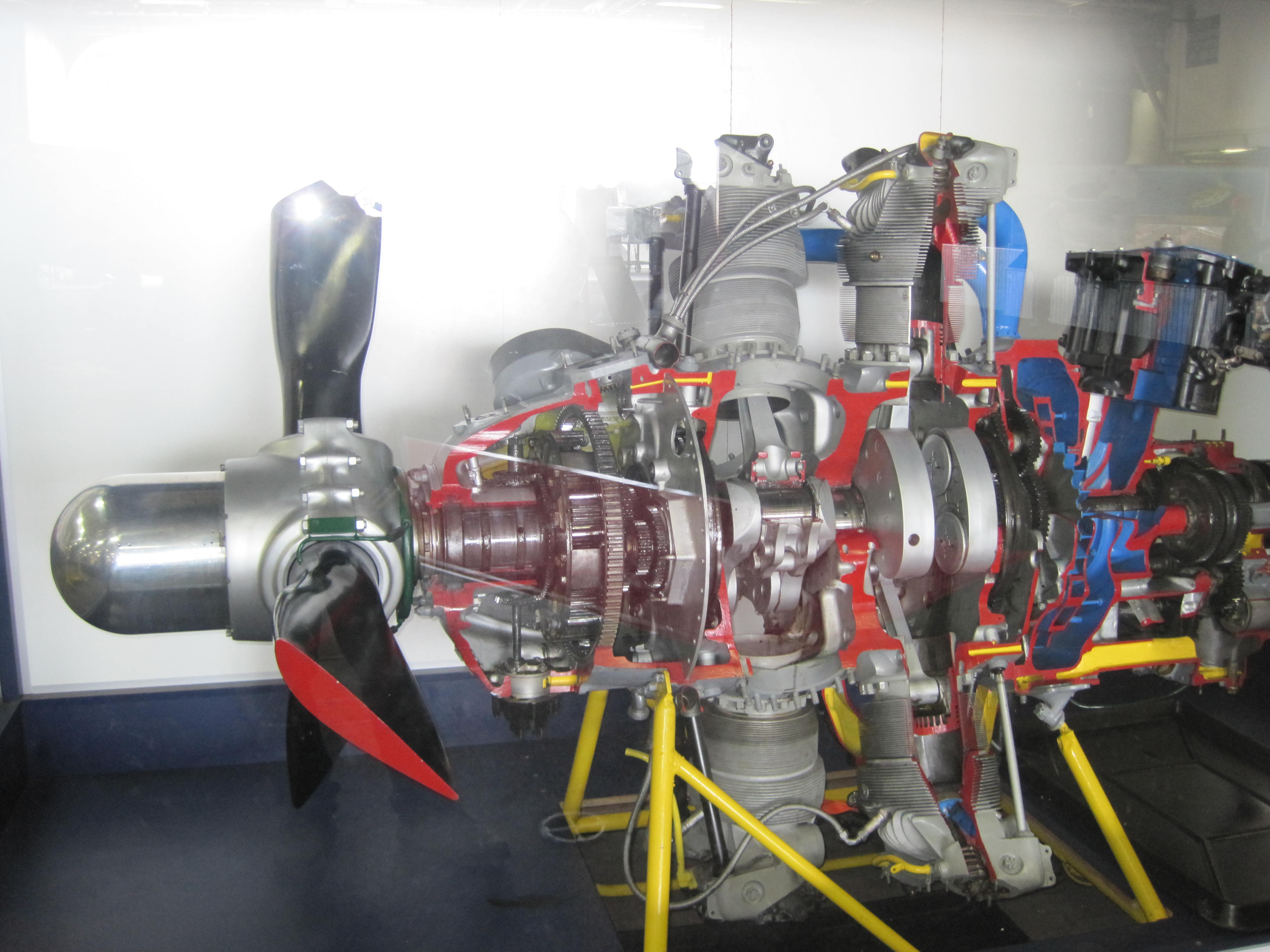
Side view of the Pratt & Whitney R-2800 engine used by the Convair 340. The right engine of the REAL aircraft was found without the propeller and the front part (left half of the photo).

Despite the investigators' efforts, the cause of the accident was never discovered. Only a portion of the aircraft's wreckage was recovered; additionally, the aircraft was not equipped with flight recorders or black boxes, items that existed only on jet aircraft of that era.

The following hypotheses were proposed to explain the accident:

- Explosion on board (dismissed after examining the wreckage);
- Accidental opening of the rear right door during the flight, which, torn off by the wind, hit the right engine (dismissed after the door was found with its locks intact);
- Damage caused by an unknown agent (bird strike, engine defect, etc.) to the right engine found without the front part and its propeller (dismissed due to the inability to determine if the lack of part of the engine and propeller was a result of impact or problems with the engine).

The plane crashed on Ilha dos Ferros, scattering wreckage across the island and into the sea, with searches for the wreckage continuing until July 6. Some wreckage was found in the region of Ilha de Paquetá. The accident contributed to the decline of Real Transportes Aéreos, which was acquired by Varig the following year. The accident also prompted the creation of a Parliamentary Inquiry Commission by the Chamber of Deputies, aimed at investigating the causes of the high number of aviation accidents in the country at that time. The CPI was chaired by Congressman Miguel Antônio Bahury, whose wife, Maria, had died in the crash of REAL Flight 435. Congressman Bahury himself died about 3 years later in the crash of Serviços Aéreos Cruzeiro do Sul Flight 144, operated by another Convair 340, near the São Paulo–Congonhas Airport.

== Bibliography ==
- Silva, Carlos Ari César Germano da (2008). O rastro da bruxa: história da aviação comercial brasileira no século xx através de seus acidentes: 1928-1996 (in Brazilian Portuguese). Porto Alegre, Rio Grande do Sul, Brazil: Edipucrs. pp. 190–193. ISBN 8539704323.
