= 2019 Toledo Convair CV-440 crash =

2019 aviation accident in Ohio

- The aircraft involved in the accident, photographed in 1965 while in service with Scandinavian Airlines System

Accident
- Date: September 11, 2019
- Summary: Stalled on approach due to pilot error caused by fatigue
- Site: Near Toledo Express Airport, Ohio, United States; 41°35′49.7″N 83°47′02.5″W

Aircraft
- Aircraft type: Convair CV-440F
- Operator: Ferreteria e Implementos San Francisco
- Registration: N24DR
- Flight origin: Laredo International Airport, Texas, United States
- Stopover: Millington-Memphis Airport, Tennessee, United States
- Destination: Toledo Express Airport, Ohio, United States
- Occupants: 2
- Crew: 2
- Fatalities: 2
- Survivors: 0

On September 11, 2019, a Convair CV-440F, operating a domestic non scheduled cargo flight in the United States from Laredo International Airport, Texas, to Toledo Express Airport, Ohio, with an intermediate stopover to Millington-Memphis Airport, Tennessee, crashed short of the runway during approach at its destination. Both pilots on board were killed. The investigation into the accident found out that the aircraft stalled during approach due to errors made by the pilots in mantaining a correct airspeed, these errors were mainly caused by the fatigue of the crew.

== Aircraft and crew ==
The aircraft involved in the accident was a Convair CV-440F registered as N24DR and manufactured in 1957.

On board the aircraft there were only two crew members, 69 years old captain Donald Peterson Sr and 72 years old first officer Douglas Taylor. The aircraft was on a non-scheduled cargo flight to ship automobile parts.

== Accident ==
The first leg of the flight from Laredo to Memphis was uneventful, then, after refueling, it took off again headed to Toledo Express Airport. At 2:35 the aircraft initiated its approach procedure to Toledo, and just four minutes later, while descending, it entered a stall, struck treetops and crashed into vehicles parked at a truck repairing facility. The aircraft and multiple vehicles on the ground caught fire and were destroyed by the blaze. Both crew members on board the CV-440 were killed, but no one on the ground was hurt. Multiple emergency crews were dispatched after the crash, and firefighter units took more than three hours to extinguish the post-crash fire. Multiple roads around Toledo Express Airport were closed for various hours on September 11 after the crash.

== Investigation ==
Due to the absence of flight recorders on board the aircraft, the investigators had to analyse its radar tracking data to examine factors like airspeed and altitude during the approach.

The National Transportation Safety Board released its final report on the accident in 2022 in which it was determined that the plane crashed during approach after entering a stall, caused by errors of pilots in monitoring and mantaining a correct airspeed for that manouver, with the plane having slowed down at a speed of around 70 knots at a low altitude. Investigators also analysed the previous flight schedules of the two pilots and concluded that, in the hours previous to the accident flight, they've overworked and received too little rest. Their fatigue is indicated as the main factor that led to the errors and failure to mantain a certain speed.

== Lawsuit ==
The owners of the truck repairing business where the Convair CV-440 crashed initiated, in July of 2021, a lawsuit against Ferreteria E Implementos San Francisco, the owner of the aircraft, due to the damage done against their property.

== See also ==
- UPS Airlines Flight 1354, another cargo flight that crashed on approach due to pilot fatigue
