= Corumbá International Airport =

Airport in Brazil

Corumbá International Airport Aeroporto Internacional de Corumbá
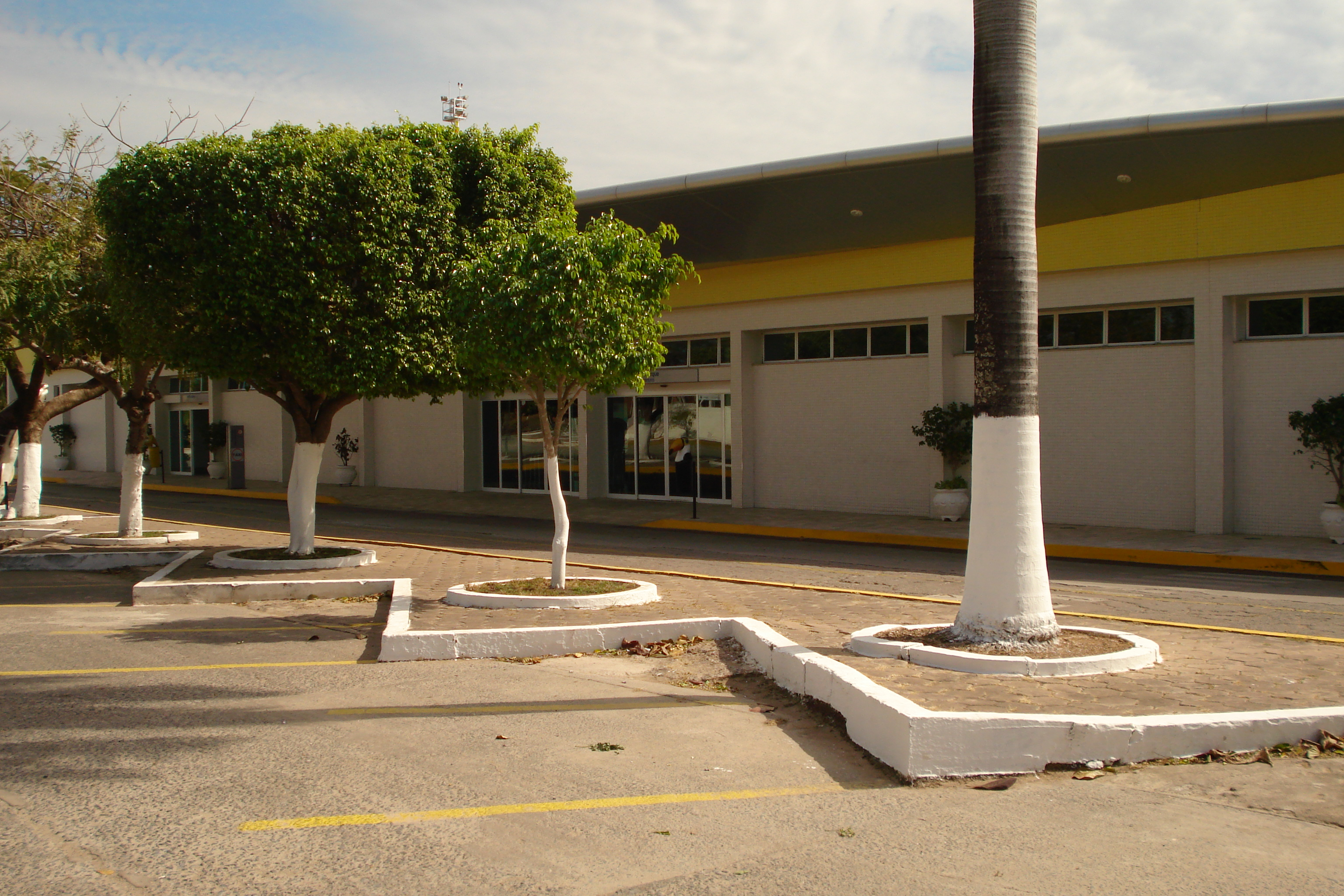
- Landside of the terminal
- IATA: CMG; ICAO: SBCR; LID: MS0009

Summary
- Airport type: Public
- Operator: Infraero (1975–2022); AENA (2022–present)
- Serves: Corumbá
- Opened: 21 September 1960; 66 years ago
- Time zone: BRT−1 (UTC−04:00)
- Elevation AMSL: 141 m (463 ft)
- Coordinates: 19°00′43″S 057°40′17″W

Map
- Location in Brazil

Runways
Direction	Length		Surface
Direction	m	ft	Surface
09/27	1,500	4,921	Asphalt

Statistics (2025)
- Passengers: 27,355 ▼2%
- Aircraft Operations: 1,746 ▼63%
- Metric tonnes of cargo: 27 ▼61%
- Statistics: AENA; Sources: ANAC, DECEA

Corumbá International Airport (IATA: CMG, ICAO: SBCR) is the airport serving Corumbá, in Mato Grosso do Sul, Brazil. It is the second most important airport in the state, after Campo Grande International Airport. The airport is operated by AENA.

== History ==
Corumbá International Airport is the second most important airport of Mato Grosso do Sul, just behind Campo Grande International Airport. Built on a site of 290 ha, it has capacity for medium size planes like a Boeing 737 or Fokker 100.

The airport was one of the first to be built outside Brazilian main centers. On September 8, 1933, Syndicato Condor established services between Rio de Janeiro, São Paulo, Corumbá and Cuiabá with wheeled tri-engine Junkers 52. This service was a major break-through because previously an overland journey to Mato Grosso took several days. In 1936, Condor made an interline agreement with Lloyd Aéreo Boliviano – LAB and established an international connection to the main cities of Bolivia, via Puerto Suárez and Santa Cruz de la Sierra, using Corumbá as a connecting point. The aircraft of Condor and LAB met in Corumbá during the overnight stop and exchanged passengers. Furthermore, the services between Corumbá and Cuiabá were operated with single-engine flying boat Junkers. The connection between São Paulo and Corumbá was completed in 6 to 7 hours, and on the next day, the hydroplane would make the Corumbá/Cuiabá route, returning on the following day. This wait plus the connecting services with LAB forced the tri-engine Junkers 52 to wait for more than two days in Corumbá to return to São Paulo. For this reason, in 1937 the federal government built by the air-strip a hangar with a width of 35 meters to shelter the repair work of the Junkers that had nearly 30 meters of wingspan. The hangar built with concrete and wood planks had small workshops and a passenger lobby.

On September 21, 1960, the present terminal was opened and in 1999 the whole airport complex was expanded: the passenger terminal was enlarged from 1,600m² to 2,400m², and the runway from 1,660x30m to 2,000x45m. In 2007 it received some repairs and further expansion.

Previously operated by Infraero, on August 18, 2022, the consortium AENA won a 30-year concession to operate the airport.

== Airlines and destinations ==
Airlines	Destinations
Azul Brazilian Airlines	Campinas

== Accidents and incidents ==
- 20 August 1953: Companhia Itaú de Transportes Aéreos, a Curtiss C-46A-60-CK Commando registration PP-ITD crashed and caught fire during an emergency landing at Corumbá. Three crew members died and one survived.

== Access ==
The airport is located 3 km (2 mi) from downtown Corumbá.

== See also ==
- List of airports in Brazil
