= Real Transportes Aéreos =

Brazilian airline, 1945–1961

IATA	ICAO	Call sign
RL	RL	REAL
- Founded: 1945
- Ceased operations: 1961
- Headquarters: São Paulo, Brazil
- Key people: Linneu Gomes, Vicente Mammana Neto

Real Transportes Aéreos (acronym to Redes Estaduais Aéreas Limitadas, literal translation: State Air Networks Limited) was a Brazilian airline founded in 1945. It was merged into Varig in 1961, when Varig bought the Consórcio Real-Aerovias-Nacional, of which Real was the main carrier.

== History ==
Real was founded by Vicente Mammana Netto and Linneu Gomes, two former TACA pilots. TACA also started up Aerovias Brasil, a Brazilian airline that later would form a consortium with Real. In November 1945 Mammana and Gomes bought three Douglas DC-3 and on November 30, 1945 it was authorized to fly. The first flight took off on February 7, 1946 from São Paulo to Rio de Janeiro. Later a second route, São Paulo to Curitiba was started.

Real grew by offering low fares because it had lower costs. It is said that it started a fare war to which followed a schedule war. In spite of this, Real was able to grow by extending the service to Curitiba to Porto Alegre and opening flights to Londrina and São José do Rio Preto. Real opened many flights to new locations in precarious operating conditions. It had a bad maintenance record and crews were pressured to fly under adverse conditions. The results were many serious accidents.

Real bought Linhas Aéreas Wright in 1948, Linhas Aéreas Natal in 1950 and Linha Aérea Transcontinental Brasileira in 1951, expanding its network on the northeast and center-west of Brazil.

In 1951 Real started its first international flight, from São Paulo to Asunción via Curitiba and Foz do Iguaçu. The Paraguayan Government also granted to Real domestic traffic rights on its route from Asunción to Uruguaiana via Encarnación. Encarnación is the most important city in the south of Paraguay.

The year 1954 brought to Real the most dramatic growth of its history: by purchasing the already established Aerovias Brasil, Real gained the prestige, experience and influence that it lacked. With the acquisition of Transportes Aéreos Nacional in 1956, a consortium which took the name of Consórcio Real-Aerovias-Nacional was created to fly on the entire Brazilian territory. Though maintaining legal independent identities, because they were controlled by the same person, Linneu Gomes, the three airlines operated jointly and in practice it was Real which controlled the consortium. The consortium dominated the passenger traffic on the triangle São Paulo, Rio de Janeiro, Belo Horizonte, the economic center of the country. In 1957 it created a route to Brasília, then still under construction.

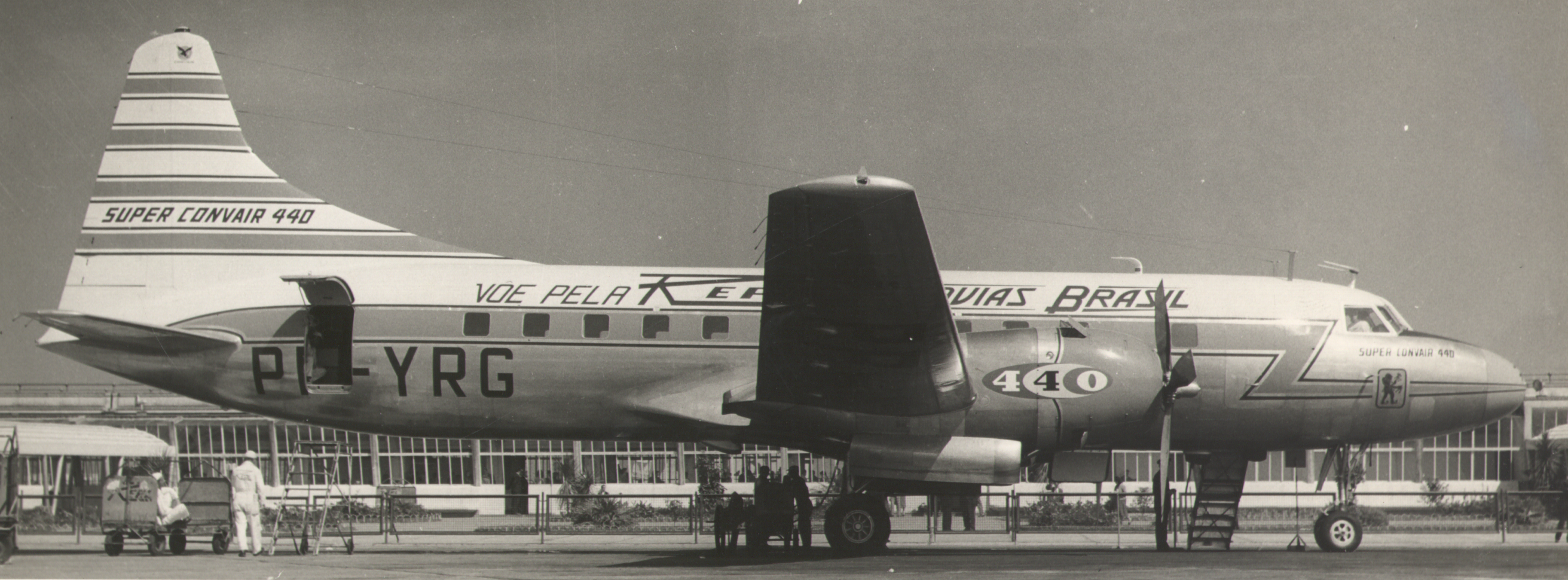
A Convair CV-440 of Real

To compete with Varig which flew from Rio de Janeiro to New York City with Lockheed Super Constellations 1049G on the east coast, Real received three Lockheed Super Constellations 1049H in 1958 and started a flight from Rio de Janeiro to Los Angeles via Manaus-Ponta Pelada, Bogotá, and Mexico City. In 1960 this route was extended to Honolulu and Tokyo-Haneda; São Paulo to Tokyo and return took just over a week.

This expansion took its toll, leading to a gradual purchase of the consortium Real-Aerovias-Nacional by Varig between May and August 1961. At this time, the airline also began flights to Chicago-Midway.

Aerovias Brasil, part of the consortium Real-Aerovias-Nacional, bought three Convair CV-990A for its intercontinental routes shortly before the consortium was sold to Varig. Varig was unable to cancel the order and had to receive and operate those three aircraft.

== Fleet ==
Real Transportes Aéreos fleet
Aircraft	Total	Years of operation
Douglas DC-3/C-47	38	1946–1961
Bristol 170 Wayfarer Mk 11A	2	1946–1947
Curtiss C-46 Commando	4	1951–1953
Convair 340	6	1954–1961
Convair 440	7	1956–1961
Lockheed L-1049H Super Constellation	4	1958–1961
Aero Commander 560/680	2	1959–1961
Douglas DC-6B	5	1961

== Accidents and incidents ==
Accidents involving fatalities

- 12 December 1949: a Douglas C-47-DL registration PP-YPM, en route from São Paulo-Congonhas to Jacarezinho crashed into a mountain while flying under extreme bad weather conditions over the location of Ribeirão Claro with faulty equipment, where an emergency landing had been attempted. Previously the aircraft had already made an unscheduled stop in Itapetininga waiting for the weather to clear. Of the 20 passengers and crew aboard, 18 died.
- 17 August 1951: a Douglas C-47-DL registration PP-YPX crashed while flying over the location of Ubatuba. All 10 occupants died.
- 14 October 1952: a Douglas C-47-DL registration PP-AXJ belonging to Aerovias Brasil en route from São Paulo-Congonhas to Porto Alegre struck high ground while flying under adverse conditions over the location of São Francisco de Paula. Of the 18 passengers and crew aboard, 14 died.
- 6 March 1955: a Douglas DC-3/C-53-D-DO registration PP-YPZ crashed during approach to land at Vitória da Conquista. The landing gear was lowered but the undercarriage did not lock. The pilot made an overshoot and during a turn to the left the aircraft struck a pole, crashed and caught fire. Of the 21 passengers and crew aboard, 5 died.
- 10 April 1957: a Douglas DC-3/C-47 registration PP-ANX belonging to Transportes Aéreos Nacional en route from Rio de Janeiro-Santos Dumont to São Paulo-Congonhas crashed into a mountain over the location of Ubatuba. The no. 2 engine caught fire, which forced the crew to make an emergency descent for Ubatuba. Due to rain, the crew noticed Papagaio Peak on Anchieta Island too late. The aircraft stalled during the evasive manoeuvre and crashed into the mountain. Of the 30 passengers and crew aboard, 27 died.
- 18 September 1957: a Convair 440-62 registration PP-AQE belonging to Transportes Aéreos Nacional, flying from São Paulo to Buenos Aires via Porto Alegre and Montevideo had an accident during touch down operations in Montevideo. While on a night landing procedure under fog, the aircraft undershoot the runway by 1,030m, causing the left and middle gear to hit an earth bank bordering a highway. The right wing touched the ground and further on the aircraft lost both propellers. The right wing then broke off. One crew member died.
- 25 February 1960: (1960 Rio de Janeiro air crash) a United States Navy Douglas R6D-1 (DC-6A) registration 131582 flying from Buenos Aires-Ezeiza to Rio de Janeiro-Galeão Air Force Base collided in the air over Guanabara Bay close to the Sugarloaf Mountain with a Real Transportes Aéreos Douglas DC-3 registration PP-AXD operating flight 751 from Campos dos Goytacazes to Rio de Janeiro-Santos Dumont. The probable causes of the accident are disputed but include error of personnel and faulty equipment. Of the 38 occupants of the American aircraft, 3 survived. All 26 passengers and crew of the Brazilian aircraft died.
- 24 June 1960: (Real Transportes Aéreos Flight 435) a Convair CV-340-62 registration PP-YRB flying from Belo Horizonte-Pampulha to Rio de Janeiro-Santos Dumont crashed into Guanabara Bay in the vicinity of Rio de Janeiro-Galeão due to unknown causes. All 54 passengers and crew died.
- 7 December 1960: a Curtiss C-46A-60-CK Commando registration PP-AKF belonging to Transportes Aéreos Nacional and operating flight 570 from Cuiabá to Manaus-Ponta Pelada crashed on Cachimbo mountains. Engine No. 2 failed during the flight. Altitude was lost, the pilot jettisoned some of the cargo but the aircraft continued to lose height. It crashed and caught fire. 15 passengers and crew died.
- 6 September 1961: a Douglas C-47-DL registration PP-AVL belonging to Aerovias Brasil, while on visual approach under adverse conditions to Concórdia crashed into a hill 1,500m short of the runway. Three crew members died.

== See also ==
- Aerovias Brasil, a partner of the consortium Real-Aerovias-Nacional
- Transportes Aéreos Nacional, a partner of the consortium Real-Aerovias-Nacional
- List of defunct airlines of Brazil

== Bibliography ==
- Instituto Histórico-Cultural da Aeronáutica (1991). História Geral da Aeronáutica Brasileira: da criação do Ministério da Aeronáutica ao final da Segunda Guerra Mundial (in Portuguese). Vol. 3. Belo Horizonte and Rio de Janeiro: Villa Rica Editoras Reunidas. p. 304.
- Instituto Histórico-Cultural da Aeronáutica (2005). História Geral da Aeronáutica Brasileira: de janeiro de 1946 a janeiro de 1956 após o término da Segunda Guerra Mundial até a posse do Dr. Juscelino Kubitschek como Presidente da República (in Portuguese). Vol. 4. Rio de Janeiro: GR3 Comunicação & Design. p. 347.
- Migliora, Carlos Affonso (1996). Breve resumo histórico da Aerovias Brasil e outras histórias... (in Portuguese). Rio de Janeiro: Sindicato Nacional dos Aeronautas. pp. 110–118.
