= Rio Verde Airport =

Airport in Goiás, Brazil

General Leite de Castro Airport Aeroporto General Leite de Castro
- IATA: RVD; ICAO: SWLC; LID: GO0009

Summary
- Airport type: Public
- Serves: Rio Verde
- Time zone: BRT (UTC−03:00)
- Elevation AMSL: 756 m (2,480 ft)
- Coordinates: 17°50′05″S 050°57′22″W

Map
- Location in Brazil

Runways
Direction	Length		Surface
Direction	m	ft	Surface
04/22	1,500	4,921	Asphalt
- Sources: ANAC, DECEA

General Leite de Castro Airport (IATA: RVD, ICAO: SWLC) is the airport serving Rio Verde, Brazil.

== Access ==
The airport is located 8 km (5 mi) from downtown Rio Verde.

== See also ==
- List of airports in Brazil
